= Piotr Śmietański =

Polish executioner during Communist regime

- Piotr Śmietański
- Born: 27 June 1899; Zawady, Poland
- Died: 23 February 1950 (aged 50)
- Citizenship: Polish
- Occupation: Executioner
- Known for: service in Ministry of Public Security

Piotr Śmietański (27 June 1899 – 23 February 1950) was a Polish non-commissioned officer and communist functionary in the Ministry of Public Security and executioner at Mokotów Prison.

Śmietański was stationed at the Mokotów Prison in the Warsaw borough of Mokotów (Polish: Więzienie mokotowskie) known also as Rakowiecka Prison located at 37 Rakowiecka Street. From World War II until the collapse of the Eastern Bloc in 1989, it was a place of detention, torture and execution of the Polish anti-communist opposition.

== Biography ==
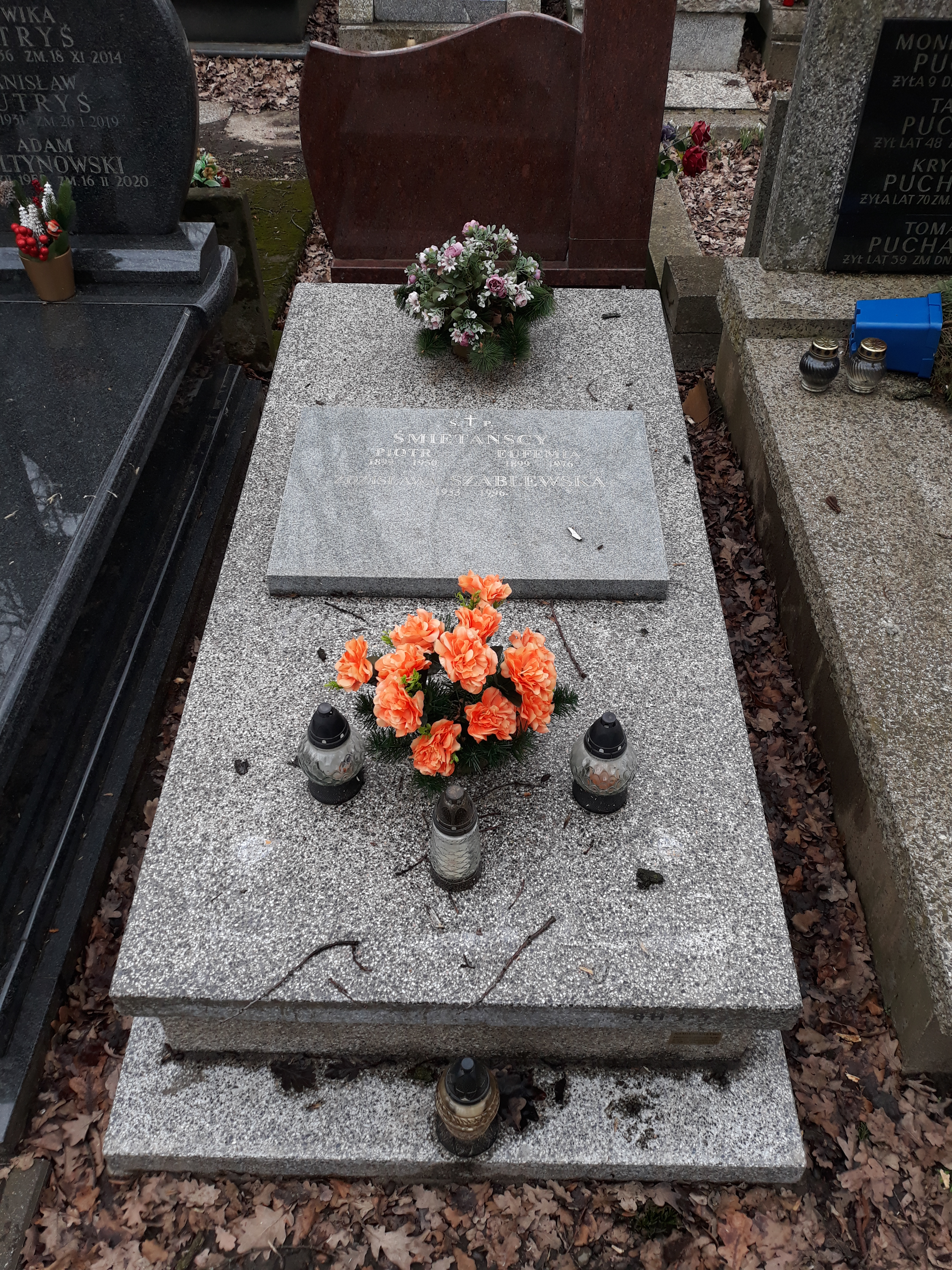
Śmietański's grave in the Bródno Cemetery, Warsaw

Śmietański was born in Zawady to an ethnic Polish working-class family.

Śmietański joined the Communist Party of Poland in 1923, using the pseudonym Mojżesz (Moses).

Śmietański — nicknamed by the inmates as the "Butcher of the Mokotow Prison" — executed personally and supervised the executions of hundreds of opponents of the Stalinist regime in the Polish People's Republic. Among them were prominent politicians, social activists and Polish underground fighters, including Lieutenants Jerzy Miatkowski, Tadeusz Pelak, Edmund Tudruj, Arkadiusz Wasilewski, Roman Gronski, Captain Stanislaw Lukasik, Commandant Hieronim Dekutowski (killed by Śmietański in one day, on 7 March 1949). and Adam Doboszyński (29 August). Those executed after Śmietański's apparent death in 1950 include Major Zygmunt Szendzielarz, Lieutenants Henryk Borowski, Antoni Olechnowicz, Lucjan Minkiewicz (8 February 1951), Captain Stanisław Sojczyński, Lieutenant Antoni Wodyński from AK, and countless others, including victims of the notorious 1 March, 1951 Mokotów Prison execution, who were given five consecutive death sentences each. As a humiliation, Brigadier General August Emil Fieldorf was hanged rather than shot.

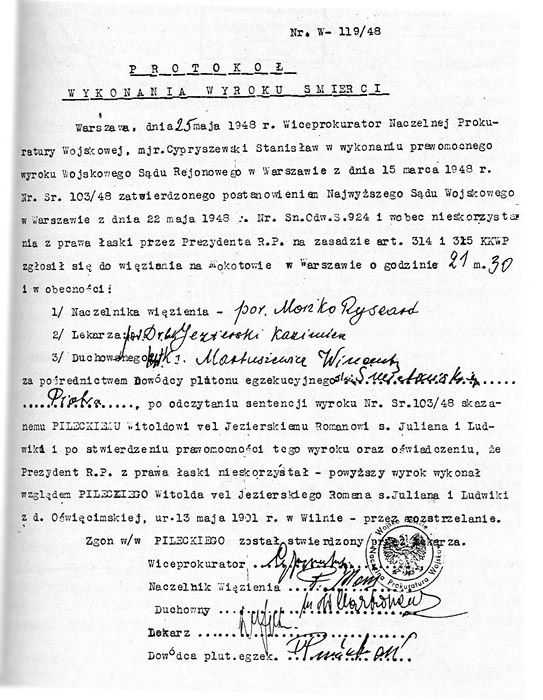
Certificate of Pilecki's execution signed by Śmietański (bottom, illegible), 25 May 1948 at the Mokotów Prison

The head of the Mokotów Prison, Alojzy Grabicki, was sometimes present at the executions. The victims' dead bodies—often undressed and placed in empty cement bags—were wheeled out at night and buried in unmarked graves, leveled out afterwards in the vicinity of different Warsaw cemeteries: in Służew (till mid 1948), the Mokotów and the Powązki cemeteries, or in open fields, in around Pole Mokotowskie, Kabacki forest and Okęcie.

On 25 May 1948, Śmietański personally executed Witold Pilecki, the founder of the Secret Polish Army and prominent member of the Armia Krajowa, famous for his daring mission to the Auschwitz concentration camp. Śmietański is believed to have been paid 1,000 Polish złoty for each execution he carried out, a substantial amount of money under Stalinism.

According to historians Szymon Hermański and Tomasz Wróblewski, some pieces in Nasz Dziennik and Najwyższy Czas! falsely claimed he had emigrated to Israel in 1968, that he was born in the 1920s, was purposefully not listed in the population registry, and was possibly still alive in Israel. However he died from tuberculosis in the Korczak sanatorium on 23 February 1950 and was buried in Bródno Cemetery four days later.

Historian Jacek Pawłowicz from IPN in his 2008 book about Pilecki claimed that Śmietański died of tuberculosis at the age of 50 in the year of his last known Mokotów executions.

Śmietański is buried in section 8H, row 1, grave 4 at the Bródno Cemetery in Warsaw, together with his wife Eufemia (1899–1976) and daughter Zdzislawa Szablewska (1933–1996).
