= Adam Lazarowicz =

Polish military officer

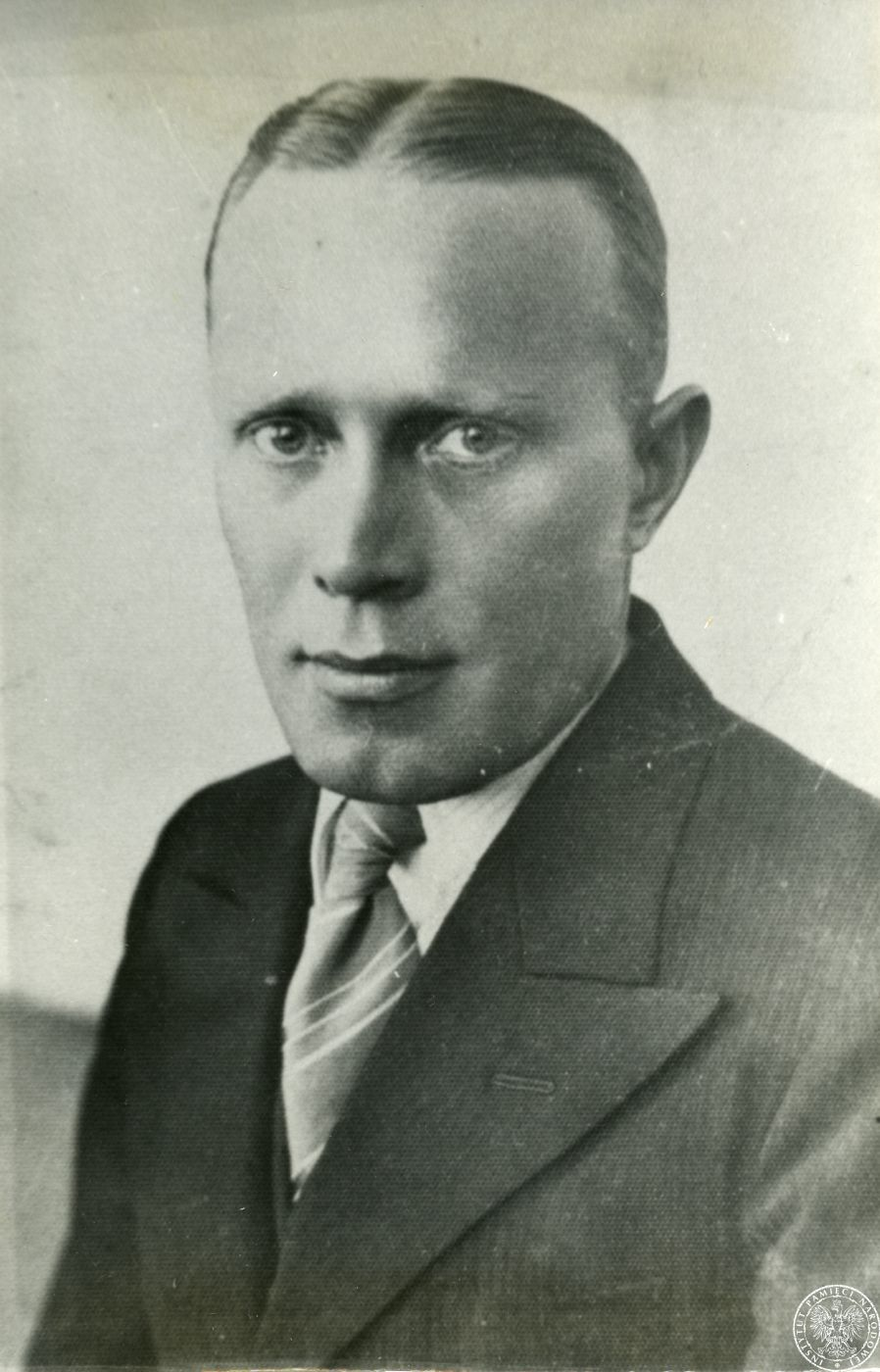
- Born: 1902; Berezowica Mała (near Zbaraz, now in Ternopil Oblast, Ukraine)
- Died: 1 March 1951 (aged 48–49); Mokotów Prison, Warsaw, Polish People's Republic
- Military career
- Allegiance: Poland
- Branch: Polish Army
- Service years: 1919 – 1951
- Rank: Major
- Commands: Commandant of Dębica town Dębica's 5th Mounted Rifles Regiment; Rzeszów Inspectorate of the Home Army
- Conflicts: Polish-Ukrainian War; World War II: Operation Tempest
- Awards: Red Star Order (Soviet Union)

Major Adam Lazarowicz (noms de guerre "Klamra", "Pomorski", "Zygmunt", "Jadzik", "Aleksander", 1902 – 1 March 1951) was a Polish military officer who played a prominent role in the Polish resistance movement in the German-occupied Poland in the Second World War.

After the war, Lazarowicz remained in hiding and become a member of the anti-Communist organization Wolność i Niezawislość (Freedom and Independence) fighting for Polish independence from the Soviet Union. He was imprisoned by the Soviet-imposed Communist authorities in Poland and executed on 1 March 1951 in Mokotów Prison in Warsaw.

== Early years ==
Adam was born in 1902 in the village of Berezowica Mała (near Zbaraz, now in Ternopil Oblast, Ukraine) to Franciszek Lazarowicz and Wanda, née Ojak.

At the age of 17, Lazarowicz joined the Polish Army. In 1919 he fought the Ukrainians in Volhynia during the Polish-Ukrainian War. Then he took part in the Polish-Soviet War and was wounded during the battle of Ostrołęka. After this conflict, he graduated from a gymnasium in Jasło, and later from the History Department of Kraków's renowned Jagiellonian University.

Due to an unknown sickness, Lazarowicz was dismissed from the Army and took up the job of a teacher in a school in the village of Gumniska, a few kilometers from Dębica. However, he remained in the reserve, and in 1936 was promoted to colonel.

== World War II ==
=== 1939 Campaign ===
During the Polish September Campaign Lazarowicz volunteered again, and he became military commandant of the town of Dębica. When Dębica's garrison withdrew to the east he joined troops fighting Germans in the area of Rawa Ruska. In October 1939, after the hostilities ended, he returned to Gumniska where he organized an underground elementary school.

=== Anti-German resistance ===
In 1940 Lazarowicz became engaged in the anti-German Sluzba Zwyciestwu Polsce organization, then joined the Zwiazek Walki Zbrojnej. Later, he was promoted to commander of Dębica (“Deser”) District of the Home Army (Armia Krajowa) and remained on this post until spring of 1944. He was a skillful organizer, under his leadership the Home Army in Dębica and vicinity thrived and due to his decision, headquarters of the District were moved from dangerous Dębica to the relatively safe village of Gumniska. The Germans never found out about it.

Lazarowicz's work was highly appreciated by the Regional Command of the Home Army in Rzeszów. He organized 10 outposts of the organization, in several locations of the Dębica County (e.g. in Pilzno and Ropczyce). Due to his efforts, the Dębica District of the Home Army was regarded as the best organized of the whole Rzeszów Command.

In 1943 Lazarowicz was promoted to captain, then to major. A year later, together with his men he worked out the German Army firing ground at the village of Blizna, where V-2 rockets were tested (see also Home Army and V1 and V2). In the spring of 1944, he became inspector deputy of the Rzeszów Inspectorate of the Home Army, and during Operation Tempest, he was commander of Dębica's 5th Mounted Rifles Regiment of the Home Army, which numbered some 1200 soldiers.

In February 1944 Lazarowicz's men organized an unsuccessful attack on a train carrying Hans Frank. As a reprisal, the Germans shot 54 Poles. A monument commemorating this event is located by the rail track in Dębica.

== After World War II ==
In late 1944, when the area of Dębica was captured by the Red Army, the Soviets awarded Lazarowicz the Red Star Order, as a gesture of appreciation of his efforts. However, he refused to accept it and in February 1945 moved to Rzeszów, where he became commander of the Rzeszow District of Wolnosc i Niezawislosc, an anti-communist Polish underground organization. Later, Lazarowicz moved to Wrocław, organizing the WiN in these parts. In December 1946 he became deputy of Łukasz Ciepliński.

== Arrest and execution ==
Lazarowicz was arrested by the Urząd Bezpieczeństwa (Polish secret police) in Żnin on 5 December 1947. After a brutal investigation, he was transported to Warsaw and placed in the Mokotów Prison. In October 1950, he was sentenced to death. His execution took place on 1 March 1951.

== Aftermath ==
For fifty years, Lazarowicz's story was censored from all publications by the Soviet-imposed Communist government of the People's Republic of Poland. In 1992, after the collapse of the Communist system, the Military Court of the Warsaw District issued a decree which voided the 1951 sentence.

A memorial plaque commemorating Lazarowicz can be found on the school in Gumniska. Also, since 1993 there has been a street named after him in Dębica.

== See also ==
- Cursed soldiers
- 1951 Mokotow Prison execution
