= Łukasz Ciepliński =

Polish soldier and anti-Nazi and anti-communist resistor (1913–1951)

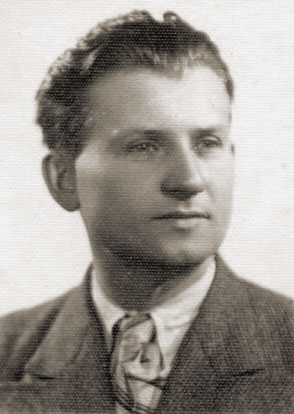
Łukasz Ciepliński

Łukasz Ciepliński (Polish pronunciation: [ˈwukaʂ t͡ɕɛˈplij̃skʲi]; 26 November 1913 – 1 March 1951) was a Polish soldier who fought in the Polish anti-Nazi and anti-communist resistance movements. He used various aliases: Pług, Ostrowski, Ludwik, Grzmot, and Bogdan. Ciepliński was executed at Mokotów Prison in Warsaw, with a shot to the back of the head by the Polish secret police, Urząd Bezpieczeństwa.

For almost fifty years, his name was expunged from all books by the Communist government of the PRL.

== Early years ==
Ciepliński was born in the village of Kwilcz, Kreis Birnbaum (Polish: Powiat międzychodzki), in then German Empire's Province of Posen, now back again Poland. Although Poland was partitioned at the time, he grew up in a patriotic family.

As his native village was located on the then-western outskirts of Polish ethnic territory, his parents – Franciszek Ciepliński and Maria (née Kaczmarek) – taught him Polish history and traditions as a child. His great-grandfather fought in the Greater Poland uprising (1848), while his older brothers fought in the Greater Poland Uprising (1918-1919). His parents owned a bakery store, and Cieplinski was one of their eight children.

Young Ciepliński began his education at elementary school in Kwilcz but completed it in Międzychód in 1929. After graduating from high school, Ciepliński enlisted with the Third Cadet Corps in Rawicz, and in 1934 enrolled in the Military College in Ostrów Mazowiecka.

In 1936, the young officer joined the 62nd Infantry Regiment in Bydgoszcz, where a year later he became leader of an antitank unit.

== World War II ==
Ciepliński was twenty-six years old when World War II began. He participated in the Battle of the Bzura and in the Kampinos wilderness, trying to get through Wehrmacht lines to besieged Warsaw. His distinguished service during the Polish September Campaign was recognized by General Tadeusz Kutrzeba, who personally awarded him Poland's highest military decoration for valor, the Cross of the Virtuti Militari for destroying six German tanks.

Ciepliński, who was the commanding officer of the antitank unit of the 62nd Infantry Regiment, destroyed the tanks on 17 September 1939, near Witkowice. In a twist of fate, it was also on that same date that the Soviet Union invaded Poland.

=== Resistance movement ===
In mid-September 1939, Ciepliński managed to reach Warsaw and took part in the defense of the city. When the Polish capital surrendered, he decided to continue the struggle. In late fall 1939, he moved to the environs of Rzeszów and from there crossed the Carpathian Mountains to Budapest where he came into contact with the Polish military. In early 1940, after further military training, Ciepliński returned to occupied Poland.

He was apprehended by the Ukrainians in Baligród, who handed him over to Nazi Germany. Imprisoned in Sanok, he escaped in April 1940 and, dressed as a Lemko peasant, eventually reached nearby Rzeszów.

=== Successes of Ciepliński and his men ===
After his return, Ciepliński began to participate in the Polish resistance movement. Promoted to the rank of commandant of the Rzeszów District of the Związek Walki Zbrojnej, later called the Home Army, he distinguished himself in several operations. Ciepliński took part in numerous operations against German outposts in the area of Rzeszów, Dębica, and Kolbuszowa. A skilled and gifted activist, he organized a successful intelligence network.

His men liquidated some 300 Gestapo agents and collaborators. In the spring of 1944, his unit captured V-1 and V-2 rocket parts. Furthermore, Ciepliński's operatives located Anlage Süd, a secret headquarters of Adolf Hitler, which was located in a rail tunnel near the town of Strzyżów.

In the spring of 1944, Ciepliński, now promoted to the rank of major, carried out the so-called "Kosba Action", aimed at the liquidation of the Nazis in the area of Rzeszów. Soon afterwards, when Operation Tempest began, his unit, reorganized as the 39th Infantry Regiment, participated in the operations that lead to the liberation of Rzeszów from the Nazis on 2 August 1944.

== After World War II ==
In the summer of 1944, Rzeszów and its adjacent area were captured by the Soviet Red Army. The Soviet Union ordered all Home Army members to give up their arms and to join the Ludowe Wojsko Polskie. Mindful of the tragic fate that befell thousands of Home Army soldiers who enthusiastically cooperated with the Red Army only to be later imprisoned and executed by the Soviet NKVD and SMERSH units, Ciepliński strongly opposed and resisted this idea.

=== Anti-communist movement ===
On the night of 7–8 October 1944, Ciepliński's unit conducted an unsuccessful operation to free some 400 Home Army soldiers, imprisoned by the Soviet NKVD at the former Nazi Gestapo regional headquarters at the Rzeszów Castle. In early 1945, he moved to Kraków and participated in the anti-communist NIE resistance movement. In mid-1945, he joined Wolność i Niezawisłość (WiN), assuming command of the Kraków District of WiN and soon thereafter assumed command of the Southern Poland District of WiN.

Fearing Communist reprisals, in early 1947, along with his wife Jadwiga, Ciepliński moved from Kraków to Zabrze, where they opened a textile store. Under his skillful leadership, the WiN organization thrived, mostly in propaganda and intelligence operations. Even though the situation in Stalinist Poland was quickly deteriorating, Cieplinski repeated a Latin adage: "Against all hope, I shall keep hope" ("Contra spem spero"). Ciepliński made a number of attempts to get in touch with Western Allies and to inform them of the situation in Poland. Finally, he was successful on one occasion when, with assistance from officials of the Belgian embassy, he was able to smuggle documents informing the West about the dire situation in Poland. The Soviet NKVD and Urząd Bezpieczeństwa were on his trail during this entire period and, finally, on 28 November 1947, he was arrested in Katowice.

== Imprisonment ==
On the following day, Ciepliński was transported to the infamous Mokotów Prison in Warsaw. He was kept in solitary confinement for months. The light in his cell was lit 24 hours a day. He was brutally tortured, with NKVD agents personally overseeing the interrogation. Since his legs and hands were broken, other prisoners had to carry him in blankets for meals. As a result of brutal torture and endless interrogations, Ciepliński went deaf in one ear. These tortures lasted for three years. In a letter smuggled from prison, Ciepliński wrote to his wife, "I was lying in a puddle of my own blood, I had no idea what I was asked about and what I was saying". He also wrote to his beloved son, Andrzej: "You see, son, together with mom we always prayed so you would grow up praising Christ, serving our Country, and making us happy. I wanted to help you with my experience, but unfortunately these are perhaps my last words to you. I will soon be murdered by the Communists for fighting for ideals I am conveying to you in my testimony. Mom will tell you about my life, and I will be dying believing that you will not let me down". In another letter dated 28 January 1951, also smuggled out of prison, Ciepliński wrote to his wife

My Dearest Wiesia, I am still alive, although these are likely to be my last days. I am held [in the cell] with a Gestapo officer. They [the Nazis] receive letters [from their families], and I don't. And I would like so much to receive even few words written by your hand […] I thank God that I can die for His holy faith, for my Country, and that he gave me such a good wife, and such a happy family life.

The trial which finally took place in October 1950 before the Military Court in Warsaw was presided over by Chief Military Judge Colonel Aleksander Warecki (real name Warenhaupt), Major Zbigniew Furtak, Major Zbigniew Trylinski and Lt. Col. Jerzy Tramer, who served as the Public Prosecutor. On 14 October, Ciepliński was sentenced to five consecutive death sentences, plus 30 years. His family appealed to then Communist president of Poland Boleslaw Bierut for commutation of the death sentence, but Bierut refused, stating that Cieplinski and his men "in their hatred of Poland and the Soviet Union, did not hesitate to commit any crime". The execution took place at 6 a.m. on 1 March 1951 in the basement of the Urząd Bezpieczeństwa prison in Warsaw. Cieplinski was shot in the back of the head in Katyn style. His body was never returned to his family, and his burial place remains unknown to this day.

On the same day, his six WiN co-conspirators were also shot at five- to ten-minute intervals. They were: Adam Lazarowicz, Mieczysław Kawalec, Józef Rzepka, Franciszek Błażej, Józef Batory, and Karol Chmiel.

== Comic book ==
In early December 2007, Rzeszow's branch of the Polish Institute of National Remembrance (IPN) announced publication of the first IPN-sponsored comic book. The work which presents the life of Lukasz Cieplinski was conceived by the Rzeszow University's Wojciech Birek (author of the screenplay) and Grzegorz Pudlowski, who drew all the pictures. It is entitled "Against hope", and has 46 pages, but as Birek says, Cieplinski's life deserves many more pages. The book begins in a courtroom in the early 1950s, during Cieplinski's trial. Then it moves back, presenting his life – Polish September Campaign and his conspiratorial activities. The authors also mention other resistance members who cooperated with Cieplinski.

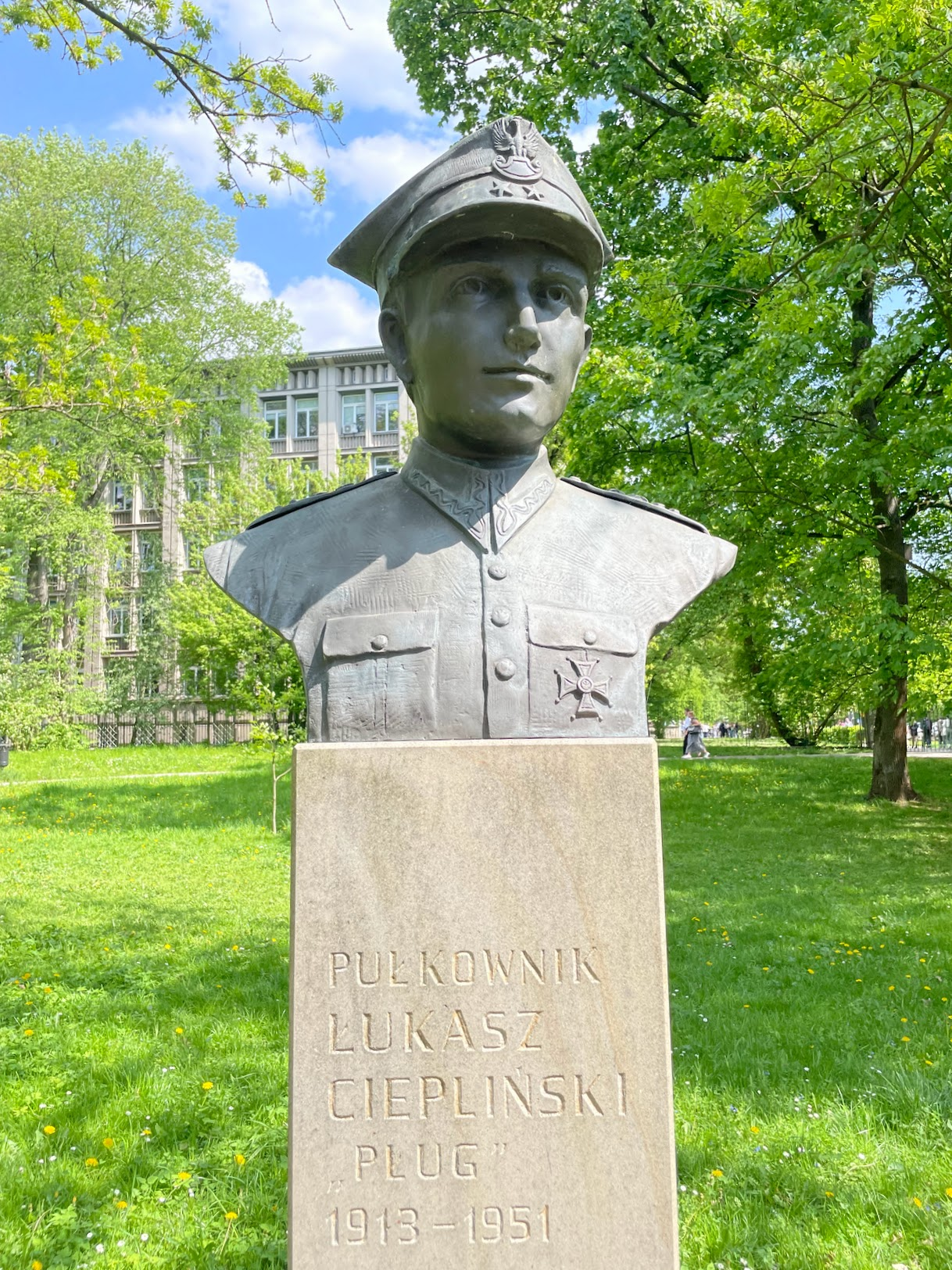
Bust of Łukasz Ciepliński sculpted by Wiesław Domański found in Henryk Jordan Park, Kraków

== Legacy ==
For fifty years, Ciepliński's name was banned from public use. His widow, Jadwiga Cieplinska and their little son Andrzej, who was only 3 years old when his father was executed, were ostracized, lived in poverty, and remained under the ever-watchful eyes of the Polish secret police. After the collapse of the Communist People's Republic of Poland, the new democratic government honored him posthumously with Poland's highest decoration for valor, the cross of the Virtuti Militari 5th Class, at the decree of President Lech Kaczyński on 3 May 2007. Commemorative plaques dedicated to his memory can be found in Rzeszów and Kwilcz; the 28th Elementary in Rzeszów has been named after him, as well as a street in the same city. The monument in his memory was unveiled on 17 November 2013 in Rzeszów.

None of Ciepliński's tormentors were ever brought to justice.

== See also ==
- Cursed soldiers
- 1951 Mokotow Prison execution
