= Karol Chmiel =

Polish resistance fighter (1911–1951)

Karol Chmiel (1911–1951) was born on 17 April 1911 in the village of Zagorzyce (now in Ropczyce-Sędziszów County, Subcarpathian Voivodeship) to the peasant family of Antoni and Katarzyna née Charchut. He graduated from high school in Dębica, and was admitted to the prestigious Jagiellonian University in Kraków, where he studied law. After graduation, in 1935, Chmiel settled in Wojslaw, a village near Mielec; his wife Irena Suchodolska was a school principal, and he worked for the Town Hall in Mielec.

== World War II ==
At the beginning of the Polish September Campaign, Chmiel tried to escape east, to the area of Lwów, where his wife's family owned an estate. Unable to do so, they returned to the village of Zagorzyce, with their three-year-old son, Jerzy. On 6 January 1940 Chmiel's wife died, after delivering their second son, Zbigniew. After this, the boys were looked after by Irena's mother and her sisters.

As early as January 1940, Chmiel became a member of Zwiazek Walki Zbrojnej, with the nom de guerre "Los". From January 1941, he was commandant of a platoon in Zagorzyce, which was part of Dębica's District of ZWZ (later: Polish Home Army). Promoted to colonel, in 1943 he decided to move to Bataliony Chłopskie (BCh), becoming in early 1944 the commandant of BCh's Dębica District. He participated in Operation Tempest activities in the area of Dębica, being a member of the local headquarters of the anti-German resistance.

Some time in 1944, Chmiel drove a captured German car, but he forgot to display a Polish flag on it, and was peppered with bullets by Home Army soldiers. Shot 13 times, he was severely wounded, but managed to survive. Nevertheless, he became partly disabled.

== After the war ==
After 1945, Chmiel settled in Kraków, where he opened a grocery store and bought a house in Swoszowice, a village in the suburbs. He was an active member of the Polish People's Party (PSL), and secretly a member of the anti-Communist organization, Wolnosc i Niezawislosc (WiN). In 1947, he became a member of WiN's headquarters and political adviser to Łukasz Ciepliński as well as a liaison between Cieplinski and the PSL's Stanislaw Mikolajczyk.

At the request of Cieplinski, Chmiel, together with Stefan Rostworowski, created a "Memorial to the United Nations". This document publicised crimes committed by the Soviet and Polish secret services on members of the disbanded Home Army and anti-Communist activists. Reportedly, WiN was planning to move Chmiel to the West, but these plans were nipped in the bud.

== Arrest and incarceration ==
Karol Chmiel was arrested by Urząd Bezpieczeństwa agents on 12 December 1947. Together with other members of WiN, he was moved to the infamous Mokotów Prison in Warsaw. For three years, he was tortured, and his family did not know about his whereabouts, as contact with the outside world was strictly prohibited.

=== Trial ===
His show trial began on 5 October 1950 and lasted for five days. Chmiel's family was allowed to enter the courtroom, so he had a chance to see his sons and hand them letters. One of these letters is now displayed in a museum in Jasna Góra.

On 14 October 1950, by the order of the Warsaw Area Court, Chmiel was sentenced to death twice. President Bolesław Bierut refused to pardon him and his co-defendants (see: 1951 Mokotów Prison execution).

== Execution ==
All sentenced persons spent their final night in separate cells. On 1 March 1951 all their private belongings were taken away, their hands were tied and mouths taped. Then they were taken to an old boiler room and shot in the back of the head, while walking down the stairs. Chmiel was executed at 8:15 pm and his body was buried in unknown location.

On 17 September 1992 Karol Chmiel was retrospectively cleared of all charges by the Warsaw Military Court.

== Sources ==
- GIMNAZJUM W ZAGORZYCACH GÓRNYCH (in Polish)

== Notes and references ==
- (in English) Polish secret police torture methods
- (in English) WiN | Freedom and Independence - A Historical Brief by Dr. Janusz Marek Kurtyka, Ph.D., Instytut Pamięci Narodowej, IPN, Poland.
