= Mieczysław Kawalec =

Polish resistance fighter (1916–1951)

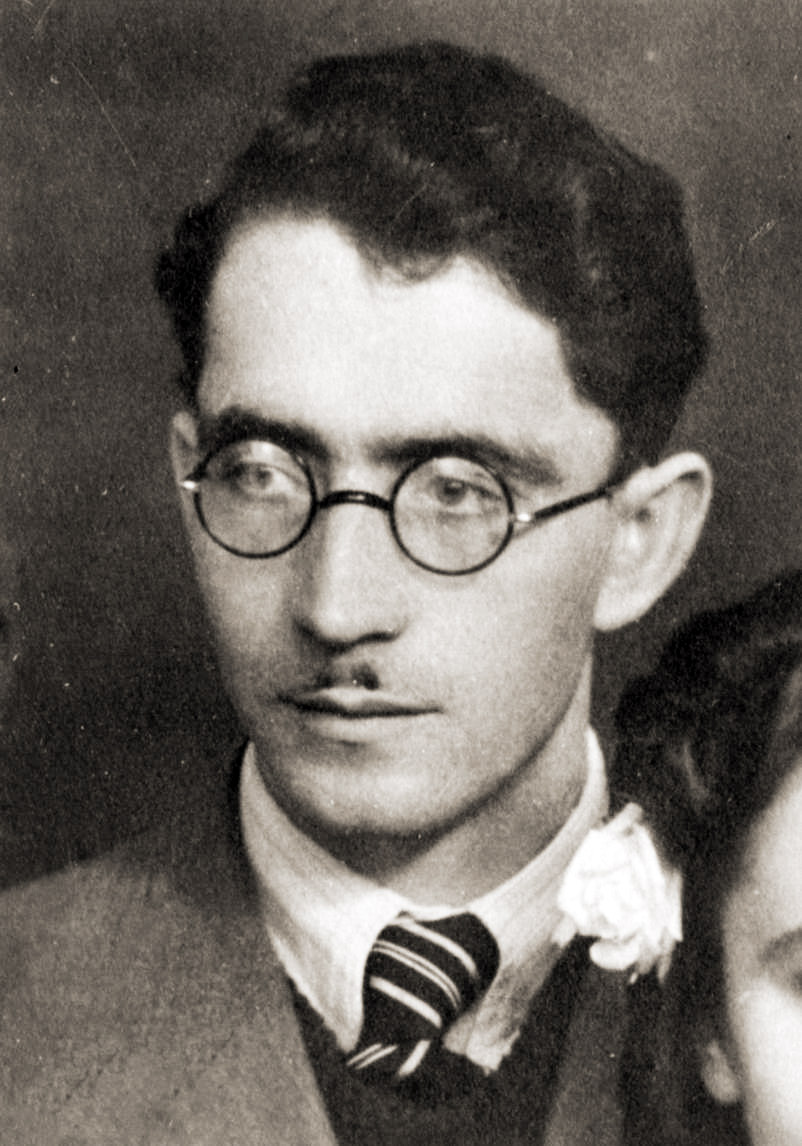
Mieczysław Kawalec before 1939

Mieczysław Kawalec (noms de guerre "Iza", "Zbik", "Psarski", "Stanislawski"), born in 1916 in the village of Trzciana, Rzeszów County, was a Polish resistance fighter. In the late 1930s, he graduated from the Law Department at Lwów University, and took the job of an assistant there. During the Polish September Campaign, he fought in the defence of Lwów, and in 1940 he joined the Rzeszów District of Union of Armed Struggle (ZWZ) (later Armia Krajowa).

From 1945, he was the commander of the Rzeszów District of the anti-Communist organization, Freedom and Independence (WiN). Later, Kawalec moved to Kraków, joining the Department of Information and Propaganda of the 4th Headquarters of WiN, under Łukasz Ciepliński and Adam Lazarowicz. Due to betrayal, he was arrested on 1 February 1948 in Poronin and transported to the Mokotów Prison in Warsaw. Tortured during the investigation, in October 1950 he was sentenced to death four times. Kawalec was executed by a shot in the head on 1 March 1951. His body was buried in an unknown location.

== See also ==
- Cursed soldiers
- 1951 Mokotów Prison execution
