= Ministry of Public Security (Poland) =

Secret police agency of Communist Poland (1945–1954)

- Ministerstwo Bezpieczeństwa Publicznego
- Coat of Arms of the Polish People's Republic used by the UB as its official logo

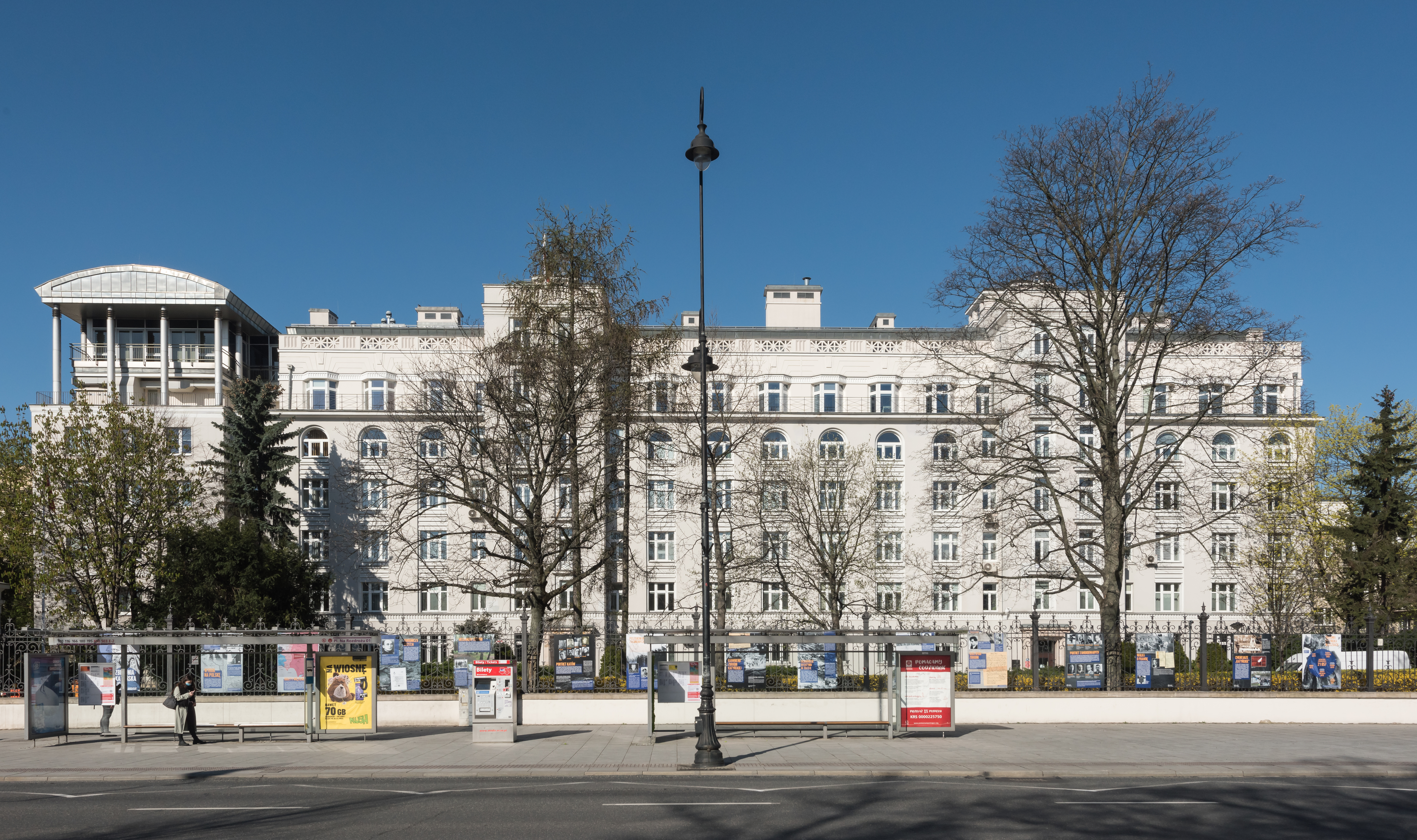
- The ministry's headquarters in Ujazdów Avenue

Agency overview
- Formed: 1 January 1945
- Preceding agency: Resort Bezpieczeństwa Publicznego
- Dissolved: 7 December 1954
- Superseding agency: Committee for Public Security
- Type: Secret police, Border Police, Internal Security Corps special purpose military formation also known as interior troops. foreign intelligence, Counterintelligence, border security, criminal investigations
- Jurisdiction: Poland
- Headquarters: Warsaw, Polish People's Republic
- Employees: 10,000 employees (1945)
- Agency executive: Stanisław Radkiewicz (1945–1954)
- Parent agency: National Security Commission, from 1949 Commission of the Secretariat of the Political Bureau of the Central Committee of the Polish United Workers Party for Public Security
- Child agencies: Internal Security Corps (KBW); Milicja Obywatelska (MO); Volunteer Reserve of the Citizens' Militia (ORMO); Border Protection Troops (WOP)

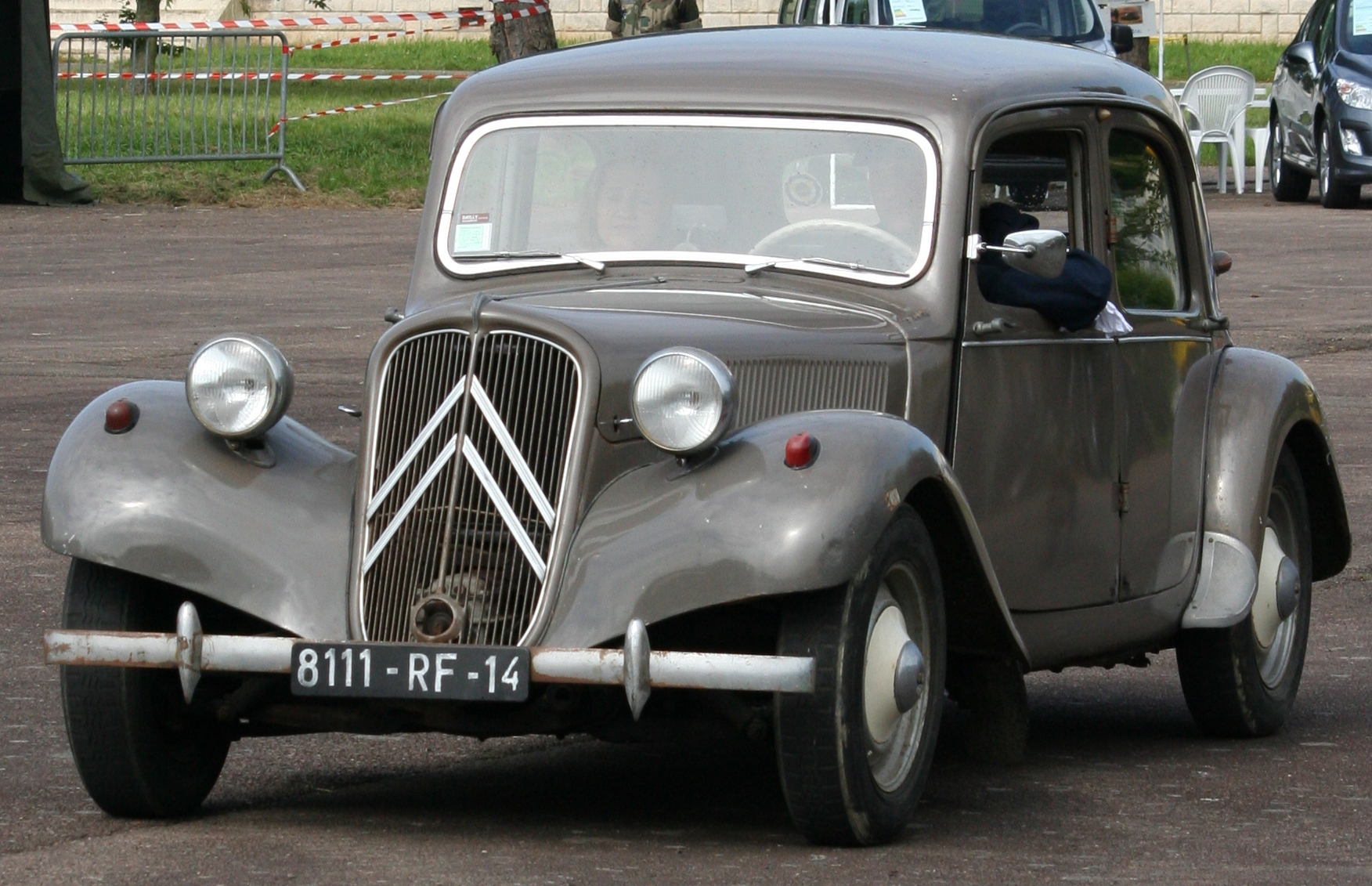
Citroën Traction Avant, a car commonly used by the UB

The Ministry of Public Security (Polish: Ministerstwo Bezpieczeństwa Publicznego), was the secret police, intelligence and counter-espionage agency operating in the Polish People's Republic. From 1945 to 1954 it was known as the Security Office (Urząd Bezpieczeństwa, UB), and from 1956 to 1990 as the Security Service (Służba Bezpieczeństwa, SB).

The initial UB was headed by Public Security General Stanisław Radkiewicz and supervised by Jakub Berman of the Polish Politburo. The main goal of the Department of Security was the swift eradication of anti-communist structures and socio-political base of the Polish Underground State, as well as the persecution of former underground soldiers of the Home Army (Armia Krajowa) and later anti-communist organizations like Freedom and Independence (WiN).

The Ministry of Public Security was established on 1 January 1945 and ceased operations on 7 December 1954. It was the chief secret service in communist Poland during the period of Stalinism. Throughout its existence, the UB was responsible for brutally beating, arresting, imprisoning, torturing and murdering at least tens of thousands of political opponents and suspects as well as taking part in actions such as Operation Vistula in 1947. The headquarters were located on Koszykowa Street in central Warsaw, but its branches and places of detention were scattered across the entire country, the most infamous being Mokotów Prison.

The Ministry of Public Security was replaced by a short-lived Committee for Public Security (1954–1956). Propaganda publicized these events, although the changes were in reality cosmetic. The competences of the MBP were taken over by the KdsBP, headed by Władysław Dworakowski. All operational, technical-operational and accounting departments of the MBP remained in the committee. It therefore maintained full surveillance and repression capabilities. Several people were removed from prominent positions, but the personal continuity of the MBP-KdsBP management was maintained. In 1956 the marginally less repressive Security Service (SB) replaced the committee in 1956. All secret servicemen, functionaries, and employees were widely known by the public as Ubecy; in English "Ubeks" and singular "Ubek/Esbek" (pronounced: OO-beck).

== History ==
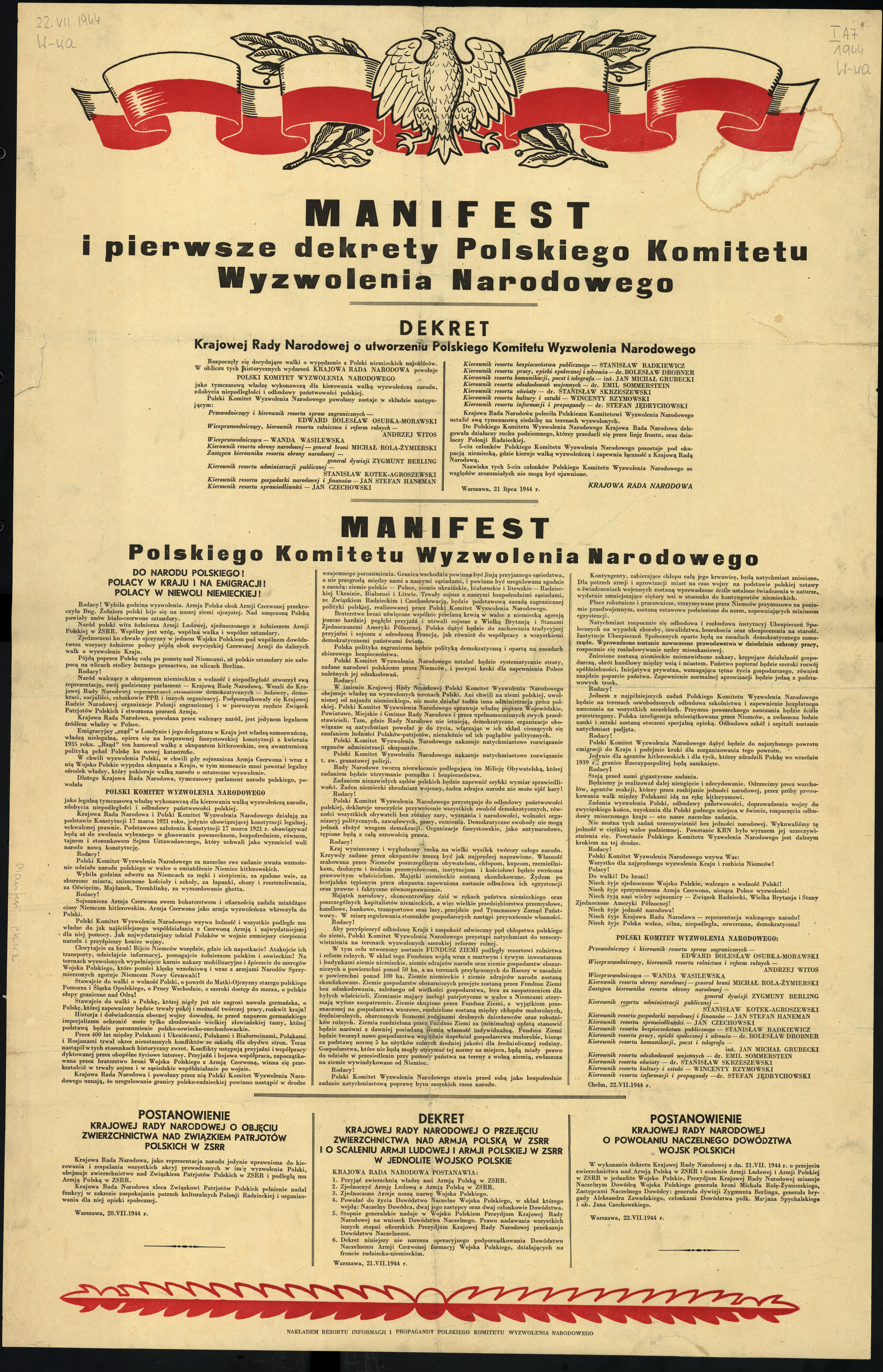
The PKWN Manifesto, issued on 22 July 1944

In July 1944, behind the Soviet front line, a brand new Polish provisional government was formed, called the Polish Committee of National Liberation (Polski Komitet Wyzwolenia Narodowego, PKWN). It was established in Chełm on the initiative of Polish communists, in order to assume control over Polish territories liberated from Nazi Germany by the advancing Red Army. PKWN was proclaimed "the only legitimate Polish government" by Stalin, with full political control and Soviet sponsorship. Within the PKWN's internal structure, there were thirteen departments called Resorty. One of these was the Department of Public Security (Resort Bezpieczeństwa Publicznego) or RBP, headed by Stanisław Radkiewicz. It was a precursor of the Polish communist secret police.

On 31 December 1944, the PKWN was joined by several members of the London-based Polish government in exile, among them Stanisław Mikołajczyk (later chased out of the country). PKWN was then transformed into Provisional Government of the Republic of Poland (Polish: Rząd Tymczasowy Rzeczypospolitej Polskiej or RTRP). All departments were renamed: the Department of Public Security became the Ministry of Public Security (Ministerstwo Bezpieczeństwa Publicznego) or MBP and UB.

=== UB tasks and numbers ===
From the end of the 1940s to 1954, the Ministry of Public Security – operating alongside the Ministry of Defence – was one of the largest and most powerful institutions in post-war People's Republic of Poland. It was responsible for internal and foreign intelligence, counter-intelligence, monitoring anti-state activity in Poland and abroad, monitoring government and civilian communications (wiretapping), supervision of the local governments, maintaining a militsiya, maintaining prisons, State Fire Servicefire services an rescue services]], and border patrol; as well as several concentration camps set up by the NKVD (such as Zgoda labour camp). In July 1947, the UB absorbed Section II of General Staff of the Polish People's Army (the Polish Military Intelligence). Military and civilian intelligence merged to become Department VII of Ministry of Public Security. In 1945, Jews comprised 18.7% of the ministry's workforce, 27% of counter-intelligence staff, 50% of managerial positions and of the press control department.

In 1950s Ministry of Public Security employed around 32,000 people. Also, UB had control over 41,000 soldiers, including 29,053 privates and 2,356 officers of the Internal Security Corps (Korpus Bezpieczeństwa Wewnętrznego, KBW), 57,000 officers in the Citizens' Militia (Milicja Obywatelska), 32,000 officers and soldiers in the Border guard (Wojska Ochrony Pogranicza), 10,000 prison officers (Straż Więzienna), and 125,000 members of Volunteer Reserves of the Citizens Militia (Ochotnicza Rezerwa Milicji Obywatelskiej, ORMO), a paramilitary police used for special operations.

=== Soviet infiltration and political repressions ===
Political penetration and military control over the country by the Soviet Union was evident in the early years of the Polish People's Republic. The Soviet Northern Group of Forces was stationed in Poland until 1956. The command and administrative structure of the Polish Armed Forces, Intelligence, Counter-intelligence, special services and Internal security organs both civilian (UB) and military (Main Directorate of Information of the Polish Army GZI WP) were infiltrated by Soviet intelligence and counter-intelligence officers, who served as the main guarantee of pro-Soviet policy of the new Polish socialist state. The Red Army provided assistance to MPB not only in the form of advisors, but also with their own paramilitary units including NKGB, NKVD, GRU, SMERSH; and, in later years MGB, MVD and KGB.

The first Russian chief advisor to the MPB was Major General Ivan Serov, a well-trained Stalinist experienced with Soviet security organs. Serov became commander of the NKVD-run militsiya during World War II. He worked as chief of the NKVD Secret Political Department, before becoming People's Commissar of Internal Affairs of the Ukrainian Soviet Socialist Republic in the USSR. In 1941–1945, he was the First Deputy People's Commissar of the State Security and later – Deputy People's Commissar of Internal Affairs of the Soviet Union. Once he became main advisor to the UB in March 1945, Ivan Serov oversaw the kidnapping of 16 top Polish politicians and underground resistance leaders, secretly transported them to Moscow, where they were tortured and thrown into jail after the staged Trial of the Sixteen. None survived.

=== The Stalinist reign of terror ===
Infiltrated by NKGB and NKVD agents – the Ministry of Public Security was well known for its criminal nature. From January 1945 (or, July 22), the surviving members of the Home Army laid down their arms, granted an official amnesty (lasting till October 15). Most were arrested by UB on the spot, tortured and tried for treason. The UB carried out brutal pacification of civilians, mass arrests (see: Augustów roundup), as well as makeshift executions (see: Mokotów Prison murder, Public execution in Dębica) and secret assassinations. According to depositions by Józef Światło and other communist sources, in 1945 alone the number of members of the Polish Underground State deported to Siberia and various labor camps in the Soviet Union reached 50,000.

Overall, in the years 1944–1956 around 300,000 Polish citizens had been arrested, of whom many thousands were sentenced to long-term imprisonment. There were 6,000 death sentences pronounced, the majority of them carried out "in the majesty of the law". A special disciplinary legislation had been introduced, which allowed for the sentencing of civil persons before military tribunals including young people and children. The courts were concerned with the alleged crimes, not the age and the maturity of its victims. For many years, the public prosecutors and judges as well as functionaries of the Ministry of Public Security, Security Service of the Ministry of Interior (SB) and Main Directorate of Information of the Polish Army (GZI WP) engaged in acts recognized by international law as crimes against humanity and crimes against peace. The so-called "Cursed soldiers" of the anti-communist resistance, who opposed the new occupiers and attacked the Stalinist strongholds, were eventually hunted down by UB security services and assassination squads. The underground structures had been destroyed, and most members of the Armia Krajowa and WiN who remained opposed to communism, were executed after kangaroo trials (staged by Wolińska-Brus and Zarakowski among others), or deported to the Soviet GULAG system.

=== Defection ===
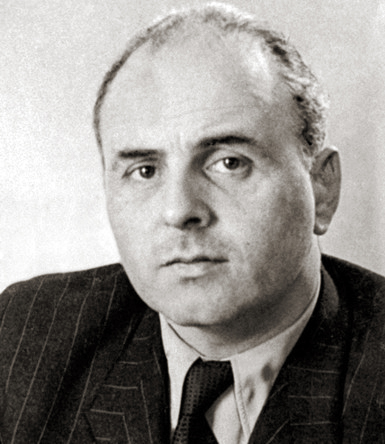
Jakub Berman

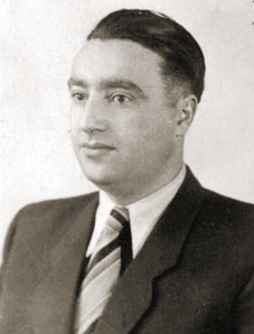
Józef Światło, defected to the West and spoke publicly of UB's brutal actions

In November 1953, First Secretary of the Polish United Workers' Party, Bolesław Bierut, asked Politburo member Jakub Berman to send MBP Lieutenant Colonel Józef Światło on an important mission to East Berlin. Światło, deputy head of UB Department 10, together with Colonel Anatol Fejgin, were asked to consult with the East German Ministry for State Security's chief Erich Mielke about eliminating Wanda Brońska.

The two officials traveled to Berlin and spoke with Mielke. On December 5, 1953, the day after meeting Mielke, Światło defected to the United States through their military mission in West Berlin. The next day, American military authorities transported Światło to Frankfurt and by December, Światło had been flown to Washington D.C, where he underwent an extensive debriefing.

Światło's defection was widely publicized in the United States and Europe by the American authorities, as well as in Poland via Radio Free Europe, embarrassing the authorities in Warsaw. Światło had intimate knowledge of the internal politics of the Polish government, especially the activities of the various secret services. Over the course of the following months, American newspapers and Radio Free Europe reported extensively on political repression in Poland based on Światło revelations, including the torture of prisoners under interrogation and politically motivated executions. Światło also detailed struggles inside the Polish United Workers' Party.

Among other activities, Światło had been ordered to falsify evidence that was used to incriminate Władysław Gomułka, whom he personally arrested. He had also arrested and falsified evidence against Marian Spychalski, the future Minister of National Defence, who was at the time a leading politician and high-ranking military officer.

== Organization ==
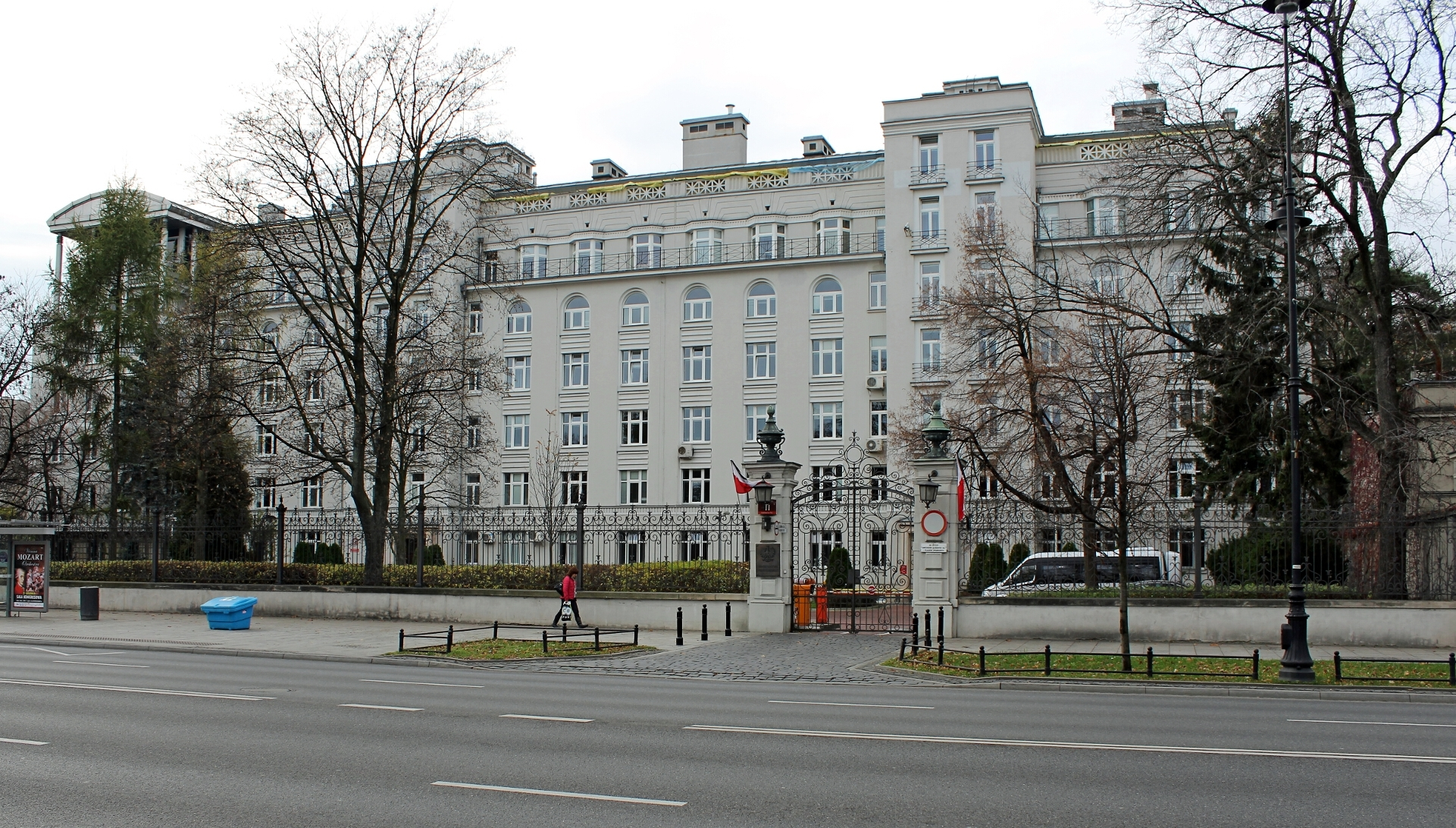
Ministry office in Warsaw (current Ministry of Justice)

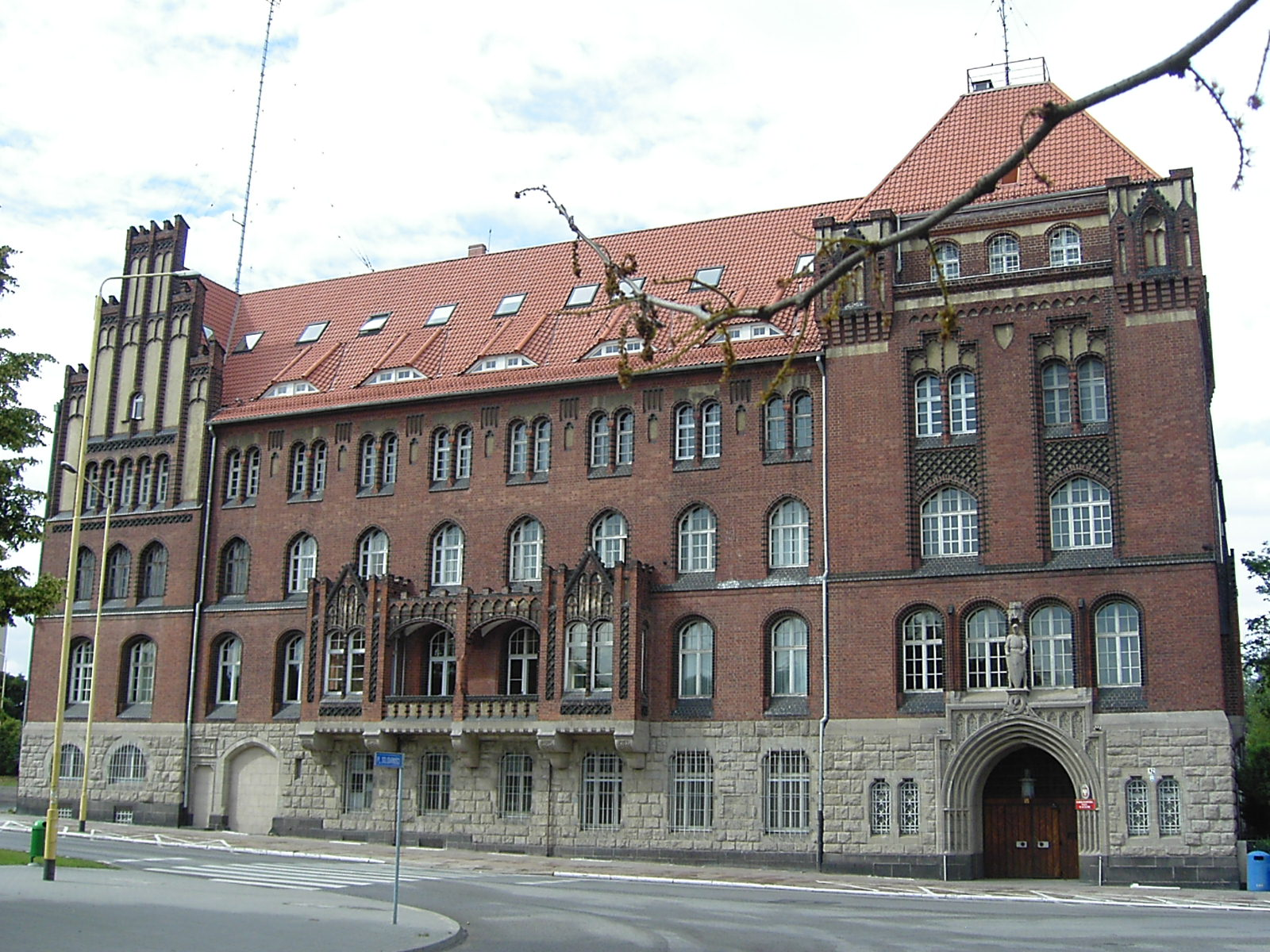
Office of Public Security regional location in Szczecin, Poland

The political and administrative matters of the Ministry came under the authority of Jakub Berman, a Stalinist from the Polish United Workers' Party. The Ministry of Public Security structure was being changed constantly from January 1945 on, as the Ministry expanded. It was divided into departments and each department was subdivided into sections entrusted with different tasks. In January 1945, the largest and the most important department in UB was Department One, responsible for counter-espionage and anti-state activities. It was headed by General Roman Romkowski. Department I was divided into Sections, each responsible for a different but specific function self-described in the following way:

1. Fighting German espionage and Nazi underground remaining in Poland.
2. Fighting reactionary underground.
3. Fighting political banditry.
4. Protection of the national economy.
5. Protection of legal political parties from outside (underground) penetration.
6. Prisons.
7. Observation.
8. Investigations.

Two new departments were formed in addition to departments and sections created for the Resort Bezpieczeństwa Publicznego (RBP) forming the core of MBP or UB in January 1945. On September 6, 1945, from the existing structure of Department I emerged three additional departments: Department IV commanded by Aleksander Wolski-Dyszko, Department V commanded by Julia Brystygier, and Department VI headed by Teodor Duda (pl). In July 1946, further changes were enacted. UB was divided into eight (8) departments, five of which dealt with operational cases, including Counter-espionage (Dep 1), Technical operations and technology (Dep 2), Fighting underground resistance (Dep 3), Protection of economy (Dep 4), and Counteraction of hostile penetration and church influences (Dep 5).

In June 1948 the Secret Office was established for Internal counter-intelligence. The Special Office conducted surveillance on members of the MPB itself. On March 2, 1949, the Special Bureau was established, renamed in 1951 simply as Department Ten. Department 10 conducted surveillance of high-ranking members of the Polish United Workers' Party and people associated with them.

=== Ministry of Public Security roster (1951 and 1953) ===
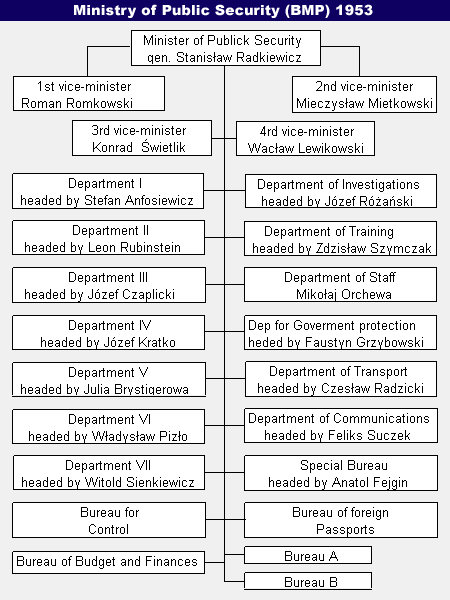
Ministry of Public Security organization for 1953, (Organizacja Ministerstwa Bezpieczeństwa Publicznego na rok 1953, Marcin Malinowski)

Minister of Public Security – Gen. Stanisław Radkiewicz (1944/54)
Deputy – Gen. Mieczysław Mietkowski (pl) (1944/54)
Deputy – Col. Konrad Świetlik (pl) (1948/54)
Deputy – Wacław Lewikowski (pl) (1949/52)
Deputy – Gen. Roman Romkowski (1946/49)
Deputy – Gen. Mieczysław Moczar (1948)

- Department I – Counter-intelligence – headed by Col. Stefan Antosiewicz (pl) (1944–48/54)
- Department II – Operative Technology and records – headed by Col. Leon Rubinstein (pl) (1947–49/51)
- Department III – Fighting "bandits" – headed by Col. Józef Czaplicki (b. Izydor Kurc, 1950/53)
- Department IV – Protection of economy – headed by Col. Józef Kratko
- Department V – Religious political and social organizations – headed by Col. Julia Brystiger (1954)
- Department VI – Prisons – headed by Col. Stanisław Pizło (1946–47/51)
- Department VII – Intelligence – headed by Col. Witold (Lewin) Sieniewicz (1950/54)
- Department of Investigations – headed by Col. Józef Różański (b. Josef Goldberg) (1945/47)
- Department for Training – headed by Mjr. Zdzisław Szymczak (1945–48/53)
- Department of Staff – headed by Col. Mikołaj Orechwa (1944/54)
- Department for Government Protection – headed by Col. Faustym Grzybowski
- Department of Transport – headed by Col. Czesław Radzicki
- Department of Communications – headed by Col. Feliks Suczek
- Special Bureau – headed by Col. Anatol Fejgin (1950/53)
- Bureau for control – deputies: Joachim Getzel (1949), Jefim Artymowicz (1952/54)
- Bureau of foreign passports – headed by Lt. Col. Władyslaw (Spychaj) Sobczyński
- Bureau of Budget and Finances – headed by Lt./Lt. Col. Szymon Ela Tenenbaum
- Bureau A (Observation of suspicious element)
- Bureau B (Central archives) – headed by Col. Zygmunt Okręt

=== UB in the field ===
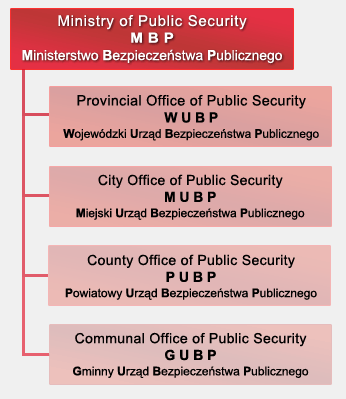
Ministry of Public Security field organization, 1953

All over Poland Ministry of Public Security had regional offices. There was one, or more UB office in each voivodeship, each of them called the Voivode Office of Public Security (Wojewódzki Urząd Bezpieczeństwa Publicznego, or WUBP). Each WUBP had 308 full-time UB officers and employees on staff. Beside WUBP, there were also City Offices of Public Security (Miejski Urząd Bezpieczeństwa Publicznego or MUBP), with 148 MPB officers and employees; as well as District Offices of Public Security (Powiatowy Urząd Bezpieczeństwa Publicznego or PUBP), with 51 officers and employees; and finally, the Communal Offices of Public Security (Gminny Urząd Bezpieczeństwa Publicznego, or GUBP), which were stationed at the local militia precincts (MO), with 3 UBP security officers on staff.

In 1953, in the field, there were 17 Voivode Offices of Public Security (WUBP), and 2 Regional Offices of Public Security on the order of WUBP. There were 268 District Offices of Public Security (PUBP) and 5 City Offices of Public Security (MUBP), which operated as District Offices of Public Security (PUBP). Together, they employed 33,200 permanent officers, of which 7,500 were stationed in their Warsaw headquarters. According to professor Andrzej Paczkowski, in 1953, there was one UB officer for every 800 Polish citizens. Never again, in the 45-year-old history of the People's Republic of Poland, were its special services' formations so large in numbers.

=== 1954 reorganization and formation of SB ===
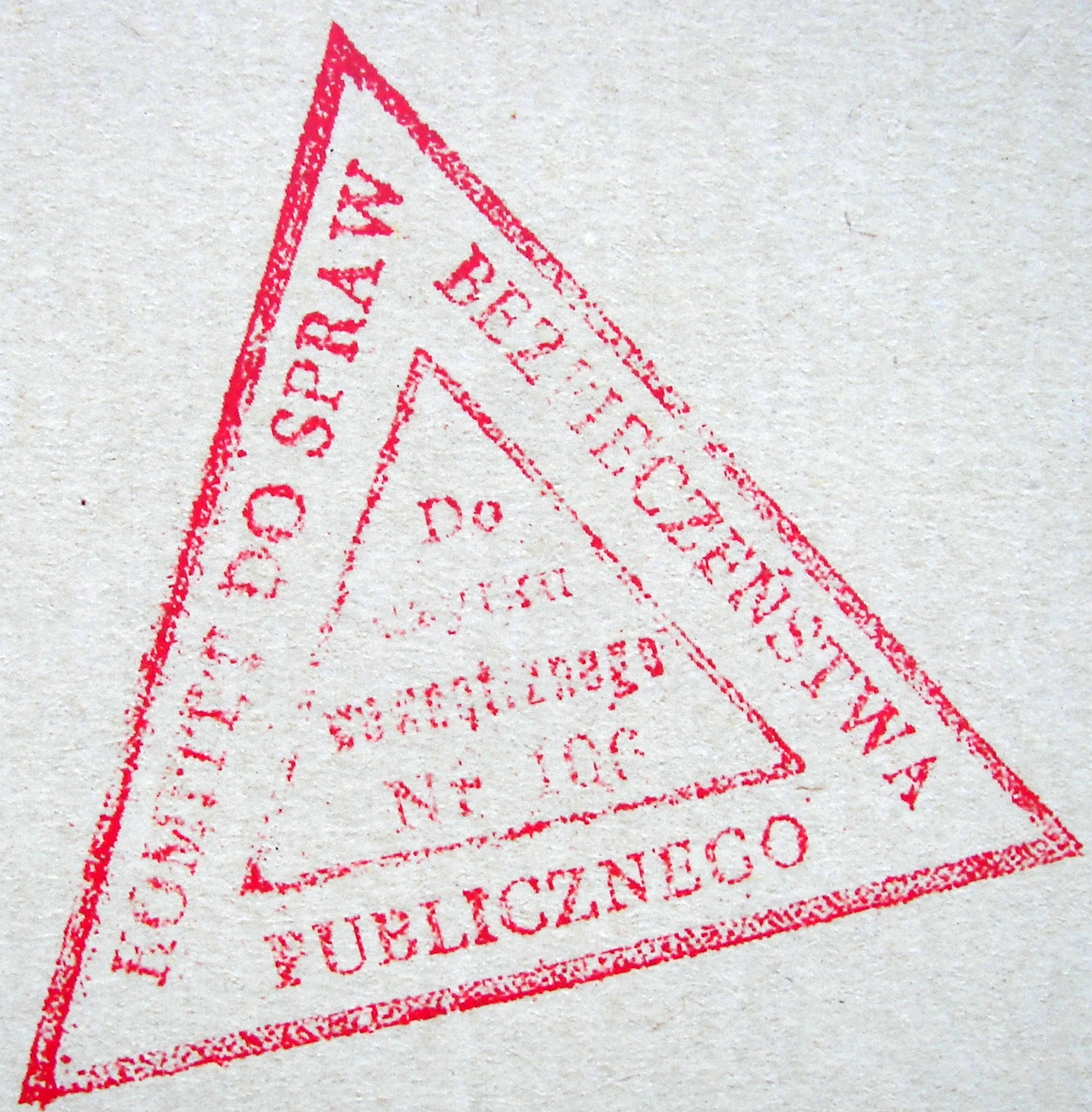
Stamp of the Committee for Public Security, 1954–1956

The highly publicized defection of Colonel Światło, not to mention the general hatred of the Ministry of Public Security among the Polish public led to changes in late 1954. In December of that year, the Polish Council of State and the Council of Ministers decided to replace the ministry with two separate administrations: the Committee for Public Security (Komitet do Spraw Bezpieczeństwa Publicznego or KDSBP), headed by Władysław Dworakowski, and the Ministry of Interior (Ministerstwo Spraw Wewnętrznych or MSW), headed by Władysław Wicha. The number of employees of the Committee for Public Security was cut by 30% in central headquarters and by 40–50% in local structures. The huge network of secret informers was also substantially reduced and the most implicated functionaries of the Ministry of Public Security were arrested. Surveillance and repressive activities were reduced; in the majority of factories, special cells of public security, set up to spy on workers, were secretly closed.

The Committee for Public Security took responsibility for intelligence and counter-espionage, government security and the secret police. From September 3, 1955 to November 28, 1956 it also controlled the Polish Army's Main Directorate of Information (Główny Zarząd Informacji Wojska), which ran the Military Police and counter espionage service. The Ministry of Interior was responsible for the supervision of local governments, the Milicja Obywatelska (Citizens' Militia, MO) police force, Prison Service, fire and rescue forces, and the Border Protection Forces. In 1956 the Committee was dissolved, most of its functions merged into Ministry of Interior; the secret police was reformed into the Security Service (Służba Bezpieczeństwa or SB) on 28 November 1956. The order was made by Władysław Wicha, who was the incumbent Minister of Interior until 1964.

== Notable MBP and UB personnel ==
- Antoni Alster (b. Nachum Alster)
- Jakub Berman
- Józef Bik (vel Jozef Bukar, vel Jozef Gawerski)
- Julia Brystiger (née Prajs)
- Józef Czaplicki (b. Izydor Kurc)
- Anatol Fejgin
- Adam Humer (b. Adam Umer)
- Julian Kole
- Julian Konar (b. Jakub Kohn)
- Grzegorz Korczyński
- Mieczysław Mietkowski (b. Mojżesz Bobrowicki)
- Salomon Morel, commander of Zgoda labour camp
- Henryk Pałka
- Julian Polan-Haraschin
- Józef Różański (b. Józef Goldberg)
- Roman Romkowski (b. Natan Grunspan – Kikiel)
- Stanisław Radkiewicz
- Leon Rubinstein
- Józef Światło (born Izak Fleischfarb)
- Helena Wolińska-Brus (b. Fajga Mindla Danielak)
- Piotr Smietanski
- Stanisław Zarakowski

== Notable people killed by the MBP and UB ==
In Warsaw, most of the killings were carried out at the Mokotów Prison. The victims' bodies – often placed naked in cement bags – were wheeled out at night and buried in unmarked graves in the vicinity of various Warsaw cemeteries and in open fields.

- 1951 Mokotów Prison execution

- Major Łukasz Ciepliński
- Colonel Karol Chmiel
- Major Adam Lazarowicz
- Captain Józef Rzepka
- Captain Józef Batory
- Comdr. Mieczysław Kawalec
- Captain Franciszek Błażej

- Comdt. Hieronim Dekutowski
- Brigadier General Emil August Fieldorf
- Bolesław Kontrym (Cichociemni)
- Cavalry Captain Witold Pilecki
- 1st Lieutenant Jan Rodowicz (Szare Szeregi)
- Danuta Siedzikówna
- Feliks Selmanowicz
- Commander Zygmunt Szendzielarz
- Capt. Stanisław Sojczyński
- Corporal Józef Franczak shot dead by ZOMO in 1963

== See also ==
- Montelupi Prison
- Zgoda labour camp, a concentration camp for Silesians, Germans, and Poles, operated in 1945 by the Polish secret police
