= Józef Batory =

Polish resistance fighter

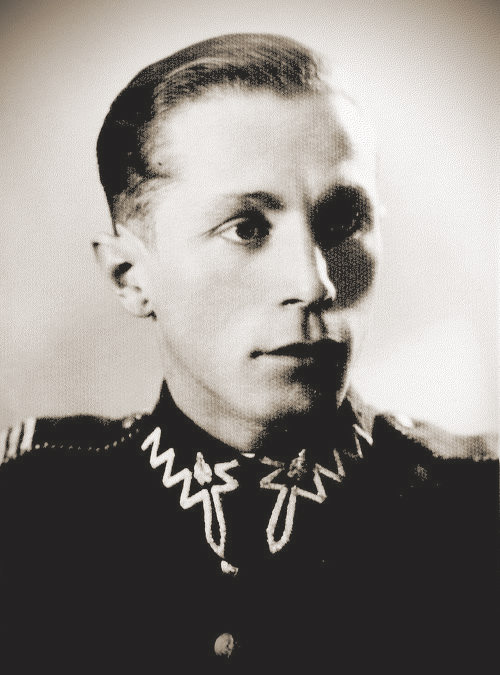
- Born: 20 February 1914; Werynia, Second Polish Republic
- Died: 1 March 1951 (aged 37); Mokotów Prison, Warsaw, Polish People's Republic
- Cause of death: Execution by shooting
- Occupation: Soldier

Józef Batory (noms de guerre "Argus", "Wojtek") was a Polish soldier and resistance fighter during World War II and after.

Batory was born on 20 February 1914 in Werynia, Poland. He fought in the 1939 Polish September Campaign, then was an active member of the anti-German resistance. In the early 1940s, he became commandant of the Kolbuszowa district of the Home Army.

From 1945 on, Batory became a leading member of the anti-Communist organization, Freedom and Independence. Apprehended by the Ministry of Public Security, some time in the late 1940s, he was executed on the evening of 1 March 1951 in the infamous Mokotów Prison in Warsaw.

The location of his grave is unknown. Batory is commemorated as one of the "Cursed soldiers" of Poland.

== Sources ==
- (in English)

(in Polish)

- (in Polish)

== Notes and references ==
- (in English) Polish secret police torture methods
- (in English) WiN | Freedom and Independence - A Historical Brief by Dr. Janusz Marek Kurtyka, Ph.D., Instytut Pamięci Narodowej, IPN, Poland.
