= Józef Rzepka =

Polish resistance fighter (1913–1951)

Captain Józef Rzepka (noms de guerre "Krzysztof", "Rekin", "Stefan", "Znicz") was born in 1913 in the village of Bratkowice in Austrian Galicia (now in Rzeszów County, Subcarpathian Voivodeship). He graduated from the 1st High School in Rzeszów, then went to Warsaw to study law at Warsaw University.

During the Polish September Campaign, he fought as a colonel in the Polish Army, then became a member of Zwiazek Walki Zbrojnej (later: Home Army), in the area of Rzeszów. In the summer of 1944, Rzepka was commandant of the Home Army field forces around Rzeszów, which took part in Operation Tempest. When the Red Army captured Rzeszów, he decided to continue fighting against the communists. On the night of 7-8 October 1944 Rzepka participated in a failed attempt to free members of the Home Army, who were incarcerated by the Soviet secret police, the NKVD, in the Rzeszów castle prison.

In the mid-1940s, Rzepka joined the anti-Communist organization Wolność i Niezawisłość (WiN), as a member of its Information Department. During the fall of 1945, he moved to Upper Silesia and settled in Zabrze. While there, he became a member of the 4th Headquarters of WiN, led by Łukasz Ciepliński. Arrested in 1948, along with a group of other members of WiN, he was transported to the infamous Mokotów Prison in Warsaw. Brutally tortured, he was sentenced to death in 1950. His appeal for clemency sent to the then president of Poland Bolesław Bierut was rejected. Captain Rzepka was executed on 1 March 1951, at 8:45 pm, in the 1951 Mokotów Prison execution with 6 other men. His body was never returned to his family and his remains were buried in an unknown location.

In 1992, the Warsaw Military Court voided the 1950 sentence and posthumously cleared Rzepka of all charges.

He was married to Zofia Sieniawska and had one daughter with her, Anna, who does not have any children.

== See also ==
- Cursed soldiers

== Sources ==
- https://web.archive.org/web/20110724160700/http://www.rzeszow.uw.gov.pl/main.php?muid=3&mid=127&akID=5022&cid=809070c69fd2cd36

== Notes and references ==
- (in English) Polish secret police torture methods
- (in English) WiN | Freedom and Independence - A Historical Brief by Dr. Janusz Marek Kurtyka, Ph.D., Instytut Pamięci Narodowej, IPN, Poland.
