= Franciszek Błażej =

Polish military officer (1907–1951)

Captain Franciszek Błażej (noms de guerre "Roman", "Bogusław") was born on 27 October 1907 in Nosówka, in Austrian Galicia. He was a professional officer of the Polish Army and participated in the Polish September Campaign. Some time in the early 1940s, he joined the Rzeszów division of the Union for Armed Struggle (later the Home Army).

In 1945, he became a member of the Rzeszów division of the anti-Communist organization, Freedom and Independence (WiN). He was editor-in-chief of the WiN magazine "White Eagle" and, between December 1946 and fall 1947, Błażej was the director of the Southern Department of WiN. Captured by the Ministry of Public Security in November 1947 in Kraków, he was beaten and tortured in the Mokotów Prison for so long that his body started to rot and gangrene set in.

In October 1950, Błażej was sentenced to death. He was executed with a shot to the head on 1 March 1951 and his body was buried in an unknown location.

== See also ==
- Cursed soldiers
- 1951 Mokotów Prison execution
