= Mokotów Prison executions of 1951 =

Coordinates: 52.207°N 21.011°E

On March 1, 1951, the Soviet-controlled Communist Polish secret police, Urząd Bezpieczeństwa (UB), carried out the execution of seven members of the 4th Headquarters of the anti-Communist organization Wolność i Niezawisłość (WiN) in the Mokotów Prison in Warsaw. All those executed were members of WiN who, during World War II, took an active part in anti-Nazi resistance.

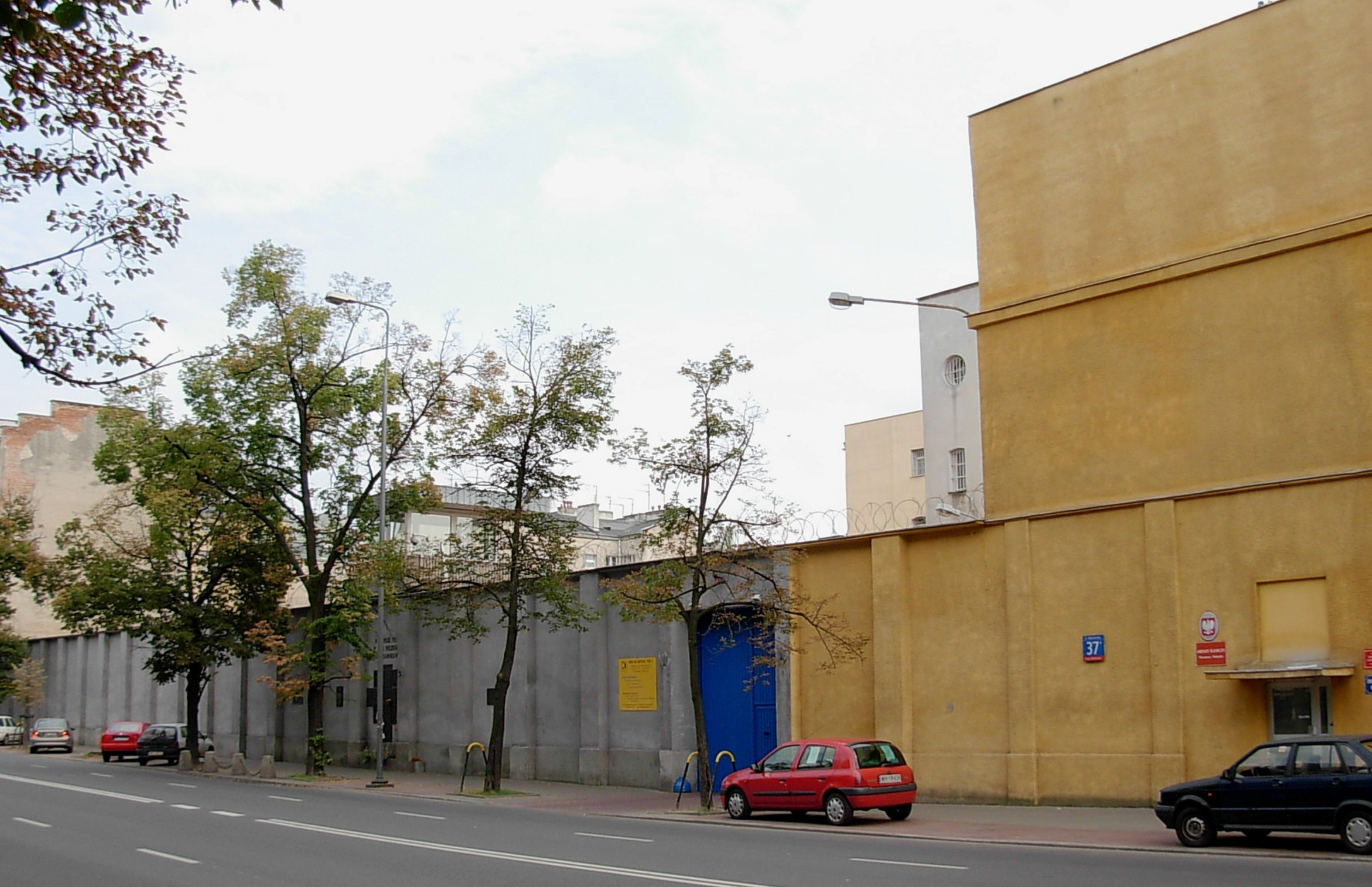
Main gate of prison

The executed men were: Łukasz Ciepliński, Karol Chmiel, Adam Lazarowicz, Józef Rzepka, Józef Batory, Mieczysław Kawalec and Franciszek Błażej. All of the men were apprehended in late 1947 and early 1948, and almost all came from the Rzeszów area. They were personally chosen to take part in the anti-Communist resistance by Ciepliński, commanding officer of the WiN's 4th Headquarters, who chose them because of their moral fortitude and their unbroken spirit.

The interrogations conducted by Communist investigators that ensued were particularly brutal. All seven were tortured and severely beaten. Cieplinski's legs and hands were broken, and he had to be carried by his fellows for meals in a blanket. A staged trial that took place on October 5, 1950, was led by a group of ruthless military prosecutors from the Warsaw Military District—Colonel Aleksander Warecki (real name Warenhaupt, who served as the presiding judge), Major Zbigniew Furtak, Major Zbigniew Trylinski and Lt. Col. Jerzy Tramer, who served as the Public Prosecutor.

The accused were not given an opportunity to refute charges brought against them, despite the fact that on several occasions Ciepliński had stated that he was tortured and that his confessions were extracted with the use of torture. The Communist judges disregarded his testimony. The courtroom was filled with UB functionaries. With approval of the presiding chief judge Warecki, the prosecutors publicly mocked the accused. The newspaper articles which covered the case ran stories that the accused men were: "Traitors, spies and American servants [who] will be prosecuted".

The accused accepted their sentences with calmness, as they had anticipated the outcome of the trial to result in their deaths. With the court ruling of five consecutive death sentences, the first of the seven men to be executed was Łukasz Ciepliński. Colonel Warecki stated afterwards that all seven were collaborating with Nazi occupiers and had betrayed Poland. After the trial, the men were moved to the Mokotów Prison, where they spent the next 137 days awaiting their execution.

Appeals for clemency sent to then Communist Poland's president Bolesław Bierut remained unanswered, and the condemned men prepared themselves for death. Realizing that his tormentors would dispose of his body, Ciepliński decided to swallow a small portrait of the Virgin Mary, which he had worn from his neck. During this time, the condemned men shared the same large cell with 80 other anti-Communist fighters, among them Zygmunt Szendzielarz. According to the surviving witnesses, the WiN members supported and helped each other, tending particularly to Ciepliński and Błażej, both of whom suffered the most during brutal interrogations.

In the letter to his wife Jadwiga smuggled out of the prison shortly before his death, Ciepliński wrote:

"My time is near. When they will be leading me out of my cell to die, my last words to my friends will be: I am happy that I will be murdered as a Catholic for my faith, as a Pole for my country, and as a human being [I will die] for justice and truth […] My last farewell will be only to you. I believe that the Holy Mother will take my soul […] and I will continue to serve Her and report to Her about the tragedy of the Polish Nation—murdered by one [nation] and abandoned by the others."

Shortly before the execution, which took place in the old boiler-room of the prison, Karol Chmiel tried to escape by running along the courtyard and screaming, "They are murdering us." He was captured on a pile of coal. Even though he had been promised that his letters would be mailed to his sons, the promise was never kept.

All seven men were shot on March 1, 1951, at five- to ten-minute intervals. They were executed with a single shot to the back of the head, the standard Communist execution method and consistent with the executions at Katyn Forest. The executions began at approximately 8 p.m., with Ciepliński being shot first, followed by Batory at 8:05, Chmiel at 8:15, Kawalec at 8:20, Lazarowicz at 8:25, Blazej at 8:35, and Rzepka at 8:45. Two of the executed men, that is, Ciepliński and Rzepka, were previously awarded Poland's highest military decoration for valor, the Cross of the Virtuti Militari.

The burial place of the seven WiN soldiers executed by the Communist regime remains unknown to this day. The 1950 court ruling rendered by the Communist court was overturned in 1992 by the Warsaw Military Court and the seven convicted and executed men were acquitted retroactively on all counts. In the 1992 court ruling, it is stated that the executed WiN soldiers "Fought and Died for a Free and Sovereign Poland." In 2011 Polish parliament declared 1 March a National Remembrance Day for Cursed Soldiers.

== See also ==
- Cursed soldiers and the Polish resistance movement in World War II
- Raids on communist prisons in Poland (1944–1946)
- Soviet repressions of Polish citizens (1939–1946)

== Notes and references ==
- http://www.honor.pl/poprzednicy.php
- (in English) Polish secret police torture methods
- (in English) WiN | Freedom and Independence - A Historical Brief by Dr. Janusz Marek Kurtyka, Ph.D., Instytut Pamięci Narodowej, IPN, Poland.
