= Hieronim Dekutowski =

Polish resistance member

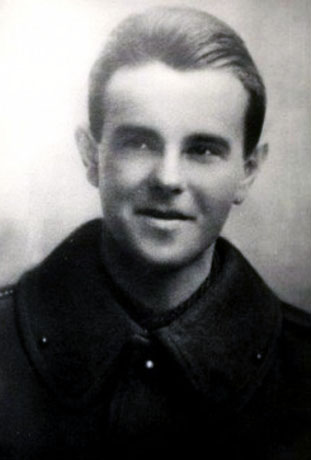
- Born: 24 September 1918; Dzików, Austria-Hungary
- Died: 7 March 1949 (aged 30); Warsaw, Poland
- Military career
- Allegiance: Second Polish Republic
- Branch: Polish Armed Forces; Polish Army in France; Polish Armed Forces in the West; Home Army; Freedom and Independence Association
- Service years: 1939-1947
- Rank: Major (Major)
- Nicknames: Zapora, Odra, Reżu, Stary, Henryk, Zagon, Mieczysław, Piątek
- Commands: Commander of the units of the Inspectorate "Lublin" DSZ
- Conflicts: Second World War; Anti-communist resistance in Poland
- Awards

Hieronim Dekutowski (noms de guerre "Zapora", "Odra", "Rezu", "Stary", "Henryk Zagon"; 24 September 1918 – 7 March 1949) was a Polish boy scout and soldier, who fought in Polish September Campaign, was a member of the elite forces Cichociemni, fought in the Home Army and after World War II, fought the communist regime as one of commanders of Wolność i Niezawisłość.

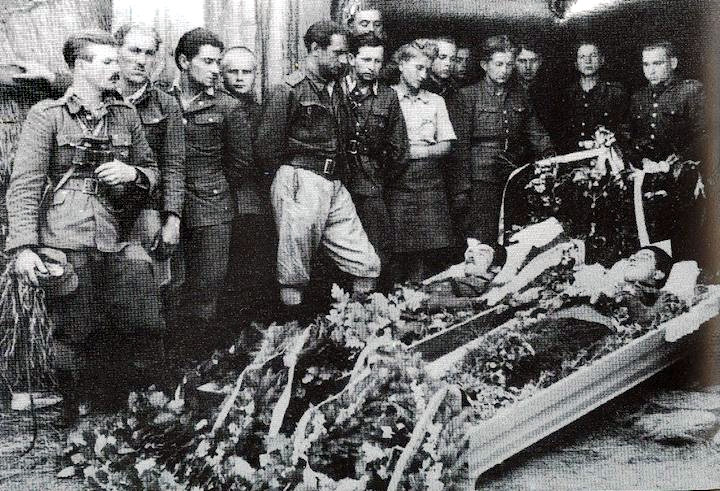
Partisans funeral 1946- soldiers of "Zapora" unit

== Early years ==
Dekutowski was born 24 September 1918 in Dzików (now a part of Tarnobrzeg). He was the youngest of nine kids of Jan Dekutowski, patriotic member of Polish Socialist Party and follower of Józef Piłsudski. His mother Maria Zofia Dekutowska (née Sudacka), did not work and stayed at home, taking care of the kids. The family was very patriotic, Hieronim's older brother Józef died in the Polish-Soviet War in 1922.

Young Dekutowski between 1930 and 1938 attended Middle School and High School of Hetman Jan Tarnowski in Tarnobrzeg. At the same time, he was a member of local branch of Związek Harcerstwa Polskiego, where he was a leader of a group of teenagers, as well as Catholic organization Sodality of the Blessed Virgin. After graduation and failing final exams (May 1938), Dekutowski worked for Count Artur Tarnowski, one of the biggest landowners in the 1930s Poland. In May 1939 Dekutowski finally completed his high school education, passing all final exams. He wanted to study at the University of Jan Kazimierz, but German and Soviet invasion on Poland made it impossible.

== September 1939 and escape to the West ==
At the beginning of September 1939, Dekutowski together with a sister evacuated to Lwów. His exact role in the Polish September Campaign has not been established; he volunteered to the Polish Army and fought in the Battle of Lwów (1939). On 17 September 1939, finding out about Soviet aggression on Eastern Poland, he crossed the Hungarian border, together with a group of soldiers. After escaping from an internment camp, across Yugoslavia and Hungary, he got to France, where volunteered to the Polish Army in France (1940) and was assigned to the 2nd Division of Infantry Rifles.

In the spring of 1940, Dekutowski attended a military academy in Coetquidan, but he did not complete the course due to Battle of France. During this conflict, he fought near Swiss border, and after capitulation of France, he escaped to Switzerland, from where he reached Great Britain. There, in late 1941 he was promoted with distinctions to the rank of officer and congratulated by Prime Minister Stanislaw Mikołajczyk. At first Dekutowski served at a tank battalion, but later was transferred to the Polish 1st Independent Parachute Brigade. On 24 April 1942, he volunteered to go to Poland.

== Back in Poland ==
On 4 March 1943, Dekutowski was sworn as a member of the Cichociemni by Colonel Michal Protasewicz. After a few more months, in the night of 16/17 September 1943, during "Operation Neon 1", he was dropped on a parachute, together with other Cichociemni - Bronisław Rachwał and Kazimierz Smolak. They landed in the area of Wyszków, but Dekutowski was soon afterwards sent to Lublin, where he became member of Kedyw of Lublin's Home Army District.

Dekutowski distinguished himself during several successful skirmishes with German occupiers, who at that time were resettling Poles from the area of Zamość, replacing them with German settlers. He helped save a number of Jews, also liquidated pro-Nazi collaborators. His unit attacked German villages, fought Wehrmacht troops, but also punished ordinary criminals.

In January 1944, Dekutowski became commandant of Kedyw of the Lublin - Puławy area. He ordered six smaller Kedyw units to join forces, thus creating a strong, mobile regiment, capable of shock attacks on German outposts and troops. According to historians, his unit carried out more than 80 attacks on Germans in the first six months of 1944. The biggest skirmish took place on 24 May, near the village of Krężnica Okrągła. Dekutowski's unit attacked a German column, consisting of sixteen trucks filled with soldiers and SS. The Germans lost some 50 men and a lot of equipment. On 17 July 1944, Dekutowski was wounded in a hand, but managed to recover in time for Operation Tempest. He wanted to come to help fighting Warsaw, but did not succeed with crossing the Vistula.

== Anti-Communist resistance ==
In early 1945 Dekutowski decided to continue hiding and fight against Communists. One of main reasons for decision was an incident which took place in the village of Chodel, on the night of 5/6 February 1945. A communist commandant of precinct of Urząd Bezpieczeństwa in Chodel named Abram Tauber, who had been saved by Dekutowski and his men during the war, invited four members of the Home Army to his headquarters. They went there, confident that they would be safe given that they saved Tauber's life. Instead, Tauber tied their hands and shot all four.

As a reprisal, Dekutowski destroyed Tauber's headquarters, and soon afterward a local war began. "Zapora" was wounded in a leg in one skirmish, but managed to escape towards the area of Tarnobrzeg. In the spring of 1945 he organized several bold attacks on Communists, among them:

- on 26 April, his unit seized the town of Janów Lubelski, liquidating several agents and releasing Home Army members from prison,
- in May he attacked Urząd Bezpieczeństwa office in Bełżyce Kazimierz Dolny, killing 5 agents and 2 Soviet officers.

In June, Dekutowski, promoted to major, retreated towards the Janowska Wilderness and put away weapons, telling soldiers to give up fighting and return to homes. However, without any guarantees of safety, he decided to escape to Western Europe with a small party of people. He managed to reach American Consulate in Prague, but had to return as the Americans refused to help.

In late 1945 and early 1946, Dekutowski organized several attacks on Communist outposts in southeastern Poland, during which up to 400 Communist soldiers and agents were killed. He would also attack villages which were sympathetic towards the Communists, such as Moniaki, where on 24 September 1946, he whipped 40 Communists. In early 1947, when the government declared amnesty, he planned to give up fighting, but found out that several of his men had been arrested and continued hiding in the woods until mid-1947.

== Capture and death ==
In September 1947 "Zapora" once again tried to escape to the West, but was caught in Nysa. Taken to the infamous Mokotów Prison in Warsaw, he was tortured and beaten during the investigation. The show trial of Dekutowski and his soldiers took place on 3 November 1948. To humiliate the accused, they were dressed in Wehrmacht uniforms. On 15 November, the court presided over by Judge Jozef Badecki (who had previously sentenced Witold Pilecki to death) sentenced Dekutowski to seven deaths. "Zapora", together with six other soldiers, was executed on 7 March 1949. According to witnesses, even though he was 30 at the moment of death, he looked like an elderly man, without teeth and nails, with grey hair, broken ribs, nose and hands. ‘We shall never surrender!’ he yelled sending his last message to his fellow prisoners.

== Aftermath ==
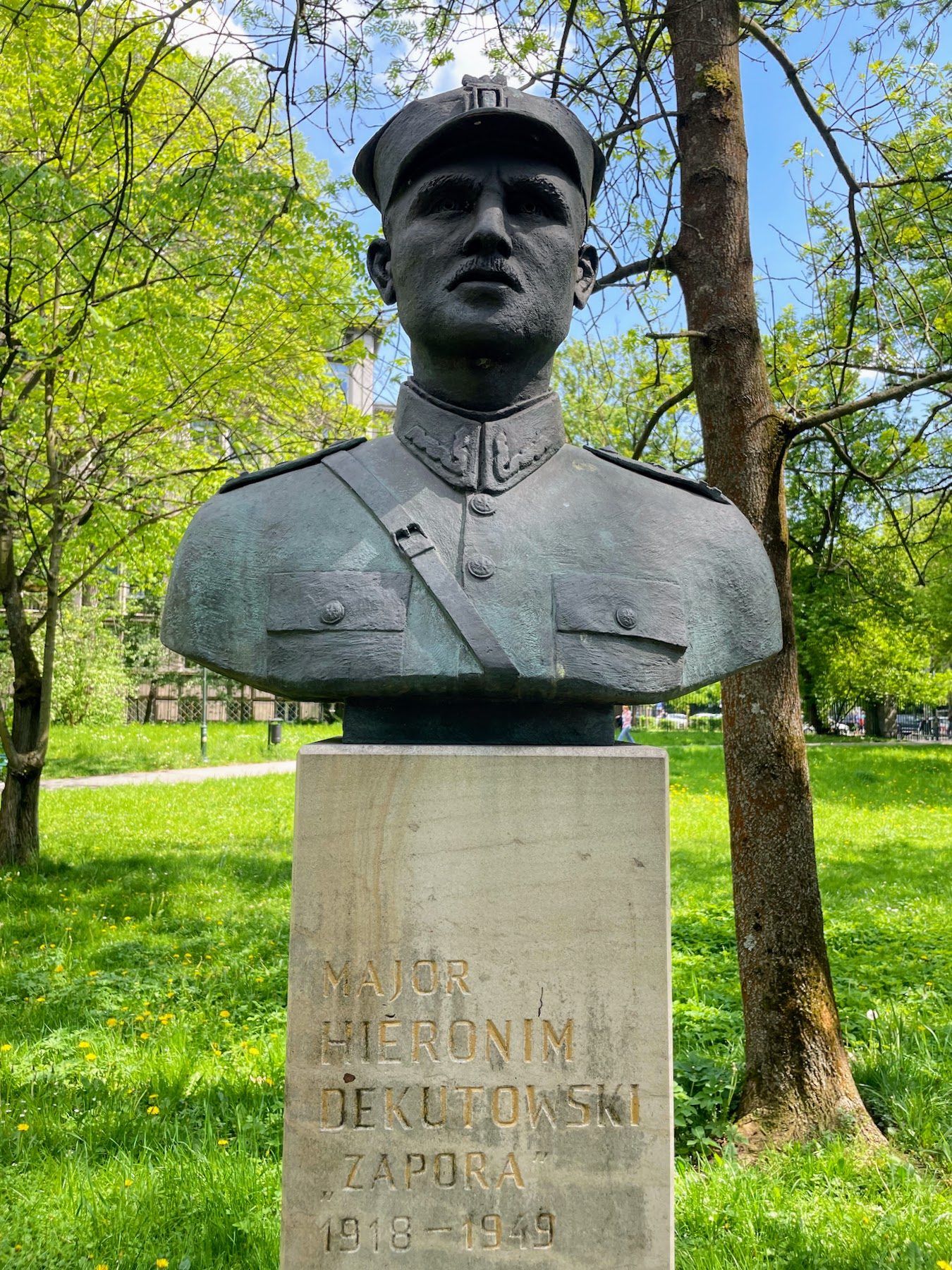
Bust of Hieronim Dekutowski sculpted by Dorota Boryło found in Henryk Jordan Park, Kraków

Dekutowski, and his men, were buried in an unknown location. His symbolic tomb is located at the Military Cemetery in Lublin. His sentence was voided by District Court in Warsaw on 23 May 1994.

Hieronim Dekutowski, and his six soldiers remains were found in the summer of 2012, at the headquarters " Ł " at the Powązki Military Cemetery in Warsaw.

27 September 2015 Major " Zapora " was solemnly buried in the pantheon - the mausoleum of cursed soldiers on Warsaw's Powązki

Middle School number 29 in Lublin is named after him, in the same city there are 2 monuments of "Zapora" and his men.

== Awards and decorations ==
- Silver Cross of Virtuti Militari (posthumously, 1964)
- Grand Cross of the Order of Polonia Restituta (posthumously, 15 November 2007)
- Cross of Valour (1945)
- Army Medal for War (four times, 1946)
- Medal of Independence (posthumously, 1989)
- Cross of the Home Army (posthumously, 1990)

== See also ==
- Cursed soldiers

== Sources ==
- Marek Jan Chodakiewicz: The Dialectics of Pain. Part III. at www.projectinposterum.org
- GAZETA POLSKA at www.gazetapolska.pl
- Monument of Dekutowski and his men in Lublin
- Page of Lublin's Middle School number 9
