= Public execution in Dębica =

Public execution

Photo of the execution

A public execution in Dębica was carried out in 1946 when three members of the Polish anti-Communist National Armed Forces (NSZ) organization—Józef Grębosz, Józef Kozłowski, and Noster Franciszek—were publicly executed by the Communist Polish authorities in the market square of Dębica in southeastern Poland.

== Introduction ==
On August 23, 1944, German soldiers left the town of Dębica, which was subsequently captured by Red Army units. However, the frontline remained on the Wisłoka river for a few months, until the beginning of 1945. Wehrmacht artillery shelled Dębica, while soldiers of the Home Army (Armia Krajowa), cooperating with the Soviets, fought the enemy. After some time the Nazis were relentlessly pushed to the west, leaving their positions and the whole area of Dębica County to the Soviets.

However, the Soviet advance was regarded by many as yet another occupation. The behavior of some Red Army units and the NKVD confirmed this notion: they persecuted, arrested, and imprisoned Polish patriots. Thousands of members of the Home Army were either shot or sent to Siberia. Under these circumstances, several members of the resistance movement decided to hide in the forests and to continue the struggle for a free Poland. After the dissolution of the Home Army, new anti-Communist organizations including Freedom and Independence (Wolność i Niezawisłość - WiN) and the National Armed Forces (Narodowe Siły Zbrojne - NSZ) were created with the purpose of ridding Poland of Soviet occupiers. In 1945, Jan Stefko (a.k.a. "Mściciel" - "The Avenger") created a branch of the NSZ affiliated with WiN in the district around Rzeszów. Grębosz, Kozłowski, and Franciszek joined the group and took part in a number of attacks on Communists, which led to their capture and eventual execution.

=== The condemned ===
Józef "Pszczółka" Grębosz was born on June 3, 1921, in Tuszyma and worked as a bricklayer. He was a member of the Polish Army until deserting in April 1945. In January 1946, he joined Stefko's group. Józef "Mruk" Kozłowski, also known as Rąbski, was born on September 30, 1924, in Bitków (USSR) and was from a peasant family. On February 2, 1946, he deserted the citizens' militia (Milicja Obywatelska – MO) of Nowy Korczyn and joined Stefko's group, where he became a commander and deputy. Franciszek "Bukiet" Noster was born on October 29, 1920, in Domaradz from a peasant farmer family. He was accused of taking part in an attack in June 1945 in a forest near Domaradz, where seven Ukrainians were killed. He joined with Stefko in January 1946.

== Anti-Communist activities ==
In the spring of 1946, Stefko's unit, of some 30 members, was staying in the area of Sędziszów Małopolski. There, an exchange of fire occurred between them and agents of the Communist secret services from the Ministry of Public Security (Urząd Bezpieczeństwa - UB). On February 9, under the command of Józef Kozłowski, Józef Grębosz, Franciszek Noster, and three others attacked the citizens' militia (MO) station in Domaradz and captured deputy commander Marian Urycie. They brought Urycie to where Stefko was staying and Stefko sentenced Urycie to death - a sentence that was carried out by Jan Dąbrowskiego on Stefko's orders.

A few days later, on February 15, a group including Stefko detained two militiamen and two officers of the District Offices of Public Security (Powiatowy Urząd Bezpieczeństwa Publicznego– PUBP): Walentego Dzięgiela and Stanisław Kosydara. Stefko's group disarmed the four men and, according to a later description by Józef Grębosz, Stefko told Grębosz to shoot Dzięgiela; and Grębosz shot him in the head. Shortly thereafter, Kosydara tried to escape and when he was recaptured, Józef Kozłowski shot him, also in the head. At the funerals for Dzięgiela and Kosydara, UB authorities announced that the perpetrators should be executed.

After this incident, the group moved towards Mielec, where on February 18 in the village of Przecław a group including Kozłowski and Grębosz attacked Communist forces which were staying at a palace of the Rey (Rejów) family, which had been nationalized. The attackers faced no resistance; they took jewelry and some paintings from the home of Stanisław Sobkowicz and left.

== Capture of the group ==
On February 20 on the way towards Jasło, Stefko's unit was caught in a trap set by soldiers of the Polish Army, militiamen, and agents of the UB in Grudna Górna. Four persons of the unit were killed, 16 captured, and 10 managed to flee, together with Jan Stefko.

Three of those captured—Grębosz, Kozłowski, and Franciszek—were sentenced to death by district court judge Norbert Ołyński and lay judges Stanisław Stefańczyk and Edmund Kaczmarek in Rzeszów on June 25, 1946, in the Regional Military Court (Wojskowy Sąd Rejonowy – WSR). The trial was prosecuted by Marian Stokłosy.

On Wednesday, July 10, 1946, Dębica's main square was full of people, as this was the market day. Two gallows were set up – one in the square, another in the vicinity of St. Jadwiga's church. The purpose of the execution was to intimidate the population of the town.

== The execution ==
The square was surrounded by the Communist Polish authorities who monitored the execution, making sure it was carried out without any obstacles. At some point, a truck entered the square, carrying three young men, who were members of WiN. The hangman, whose name was probably Stanisław Swieca, haltered all of them and soon afterward the truck drove off, leaving the condemned hanging in the air.

The number of people who witnessed the event is unclear. Some witnesses claim that the head of one of the condemned men slipped out of his halter, but this was quickly resolved. Deaths were announced by Doctor Roman Lic and Marian Stoklosa from Rzeszów prosecutor's office. The three were buried secretly by UB officers at the cemetery in Dębica and their graves were marked by members of the WiN.

Other members of the group were captured and executed shortly after, including Jan Gomółka on July 11, 1946, and Zygmunt Ząbk on August 1, 1946. Stefko was shot in the autumn of 1946, although there were later investigations into whether or not he was actually killed.

== Photograph ==
The whole incident would most likely have been forgotten had it not been for a photograph taken by Józef Stec. The snapshot was taken from the window of a nearby building. It was delivered to London and published in several Western newspapers. Stec was quickly captured and imprisoned, and spent many years behind bars.
