= Werynia =

- Village
- Tyszkiewicz Palace in Werynia

- Location within Poland
- Coordinates: 50°15′N 21°50′E
- Country: Poland
- Voivodeship: Subcarpathian
- County: Kolbuszowa
- Gmina: Kolbuszowa

Population
  - Total: 1,500
- Time zone: UTC+1 (CET)
  - Summer (DST): UTC+2 (CEST)
- Vehicle registration: RKL

Werynia [vɛˈrɨɲa] is a village in the administrative district of Gmina Kolbuszowa, within Kolbuszowa County, Subcarpathian Voivodeship, in south-eastern Poland.

Four Polish citizens were murdered by Nazi Germany in the village during World War II.

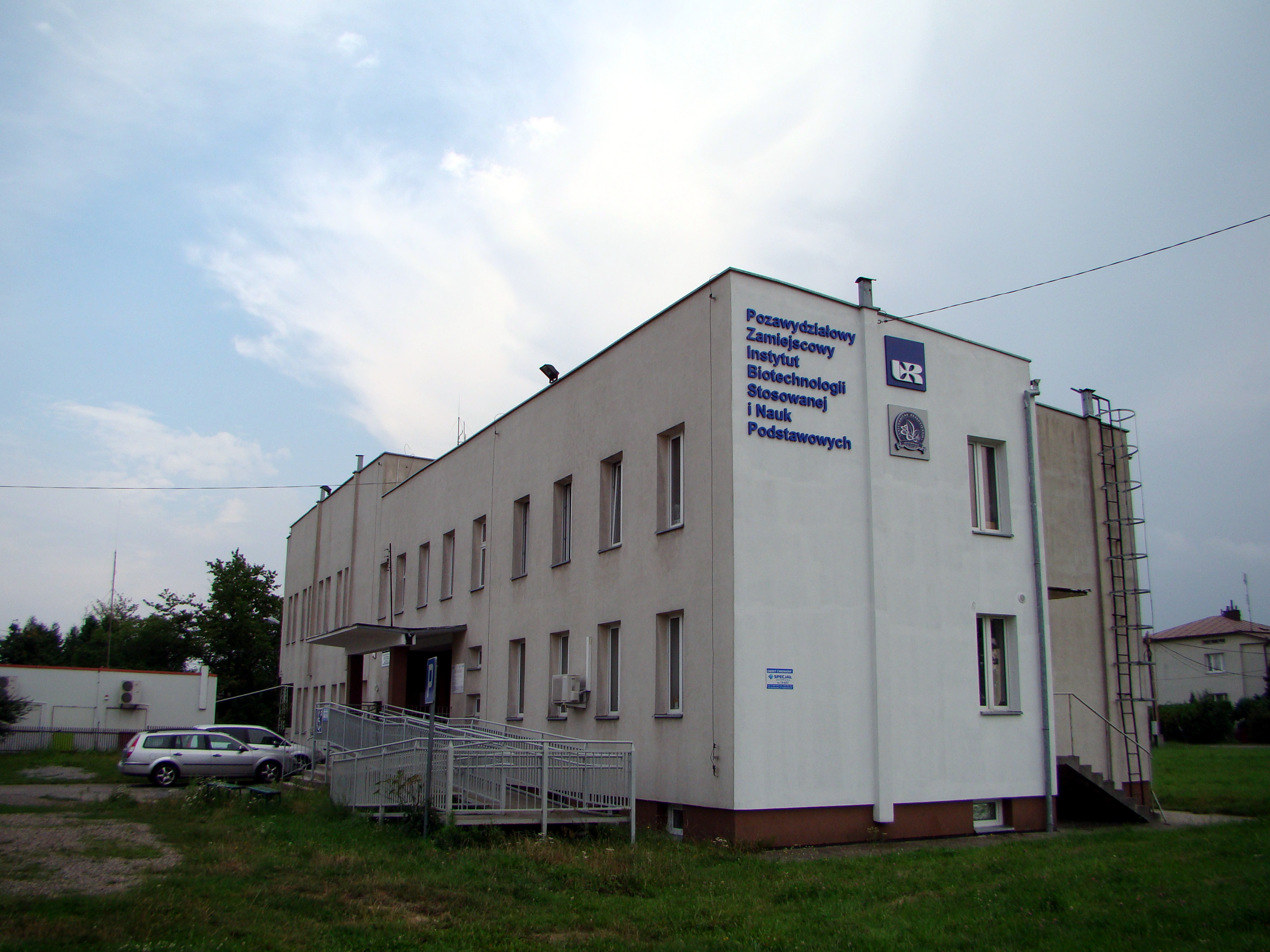
Branch Campus of the Faculty of Biotechnology of University of Rzeszów
