= Bolesław Kontrym =

Polish Army officer (1898–1953)

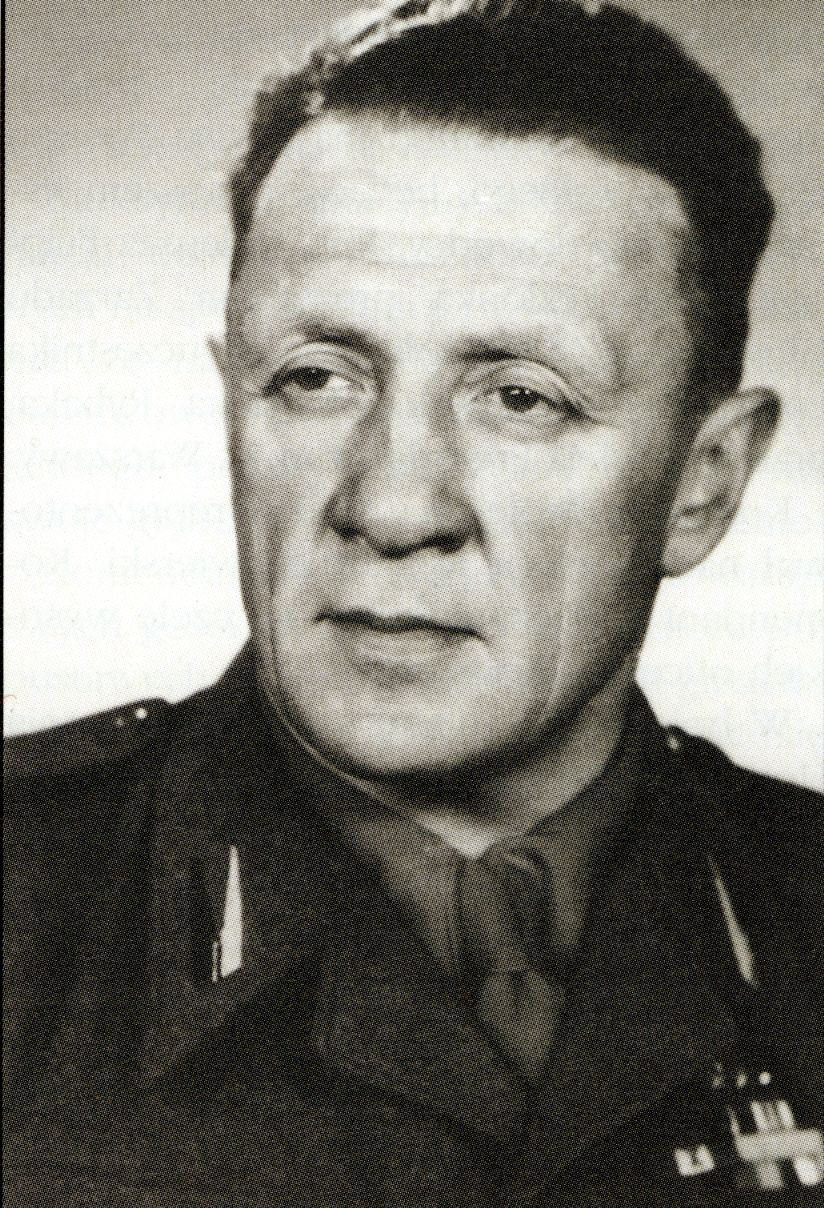
- Bolesław Kontrym nom de guerre Żmudzin et al
- Born: 27 August 1898; Zatruka, partitioned Poland
- Died: 20 January 1953 (aged 54); Warsaw, Poland
- Other names: Żmudzin, Biały, Bielski, Cichocki
- Known for: Cichociemni

Lieutenant Bolesław Kontrym (Zatruka, Russian Empire, 27 August 1898 – 20 January 1953, Warsaw, Poland), also known by codenames Żmudzin, Biały, Bielski and Cichocki, was a Polish Army officer, a Home Army soldier, participant in the Warsaw Uprising and organizer of underground secret-police force Cichociemni.

== Life ==
Kontrym was born 27 August 1898 in Zaturka, near Łuck in Wołyń. He began his military career by volunteering for the Imperial Russian Army in March 1915. Initially he served in the 106th Infantry Regiment, completing NCO training in Saratov. Between August and December 1915 he commanded a platoon of the 250th Infantry Regiment, and from June 1916 he served as adjutant of the 3rd Battalion of the 127th Infantry Regiment. In August 1917 he was promoted to the rank of lieutenant and was made commanding officer of a cavalry reconnaissance unit of the 660th Infantry Regiment.

Kontrym joined Polish Army units that were forming in Russia and from 1918 served in the 5th Cavalry Regiment of the II Polish Army Corps. In May 1918 the Corps was disarmed and interned by the Germans at Kaniow. Kontrym escaped from the German POW camp and attempted to join Polish Army units in Murmansk, Russia. In October 1918 he was arrested by the Bolshevik Cheka and conscripted into the Red Army. He fought against the Polish Army as commander of 82 Infantry Regiment and 28th Brigade of the 10th Infantry Division. For his abilities and gallantry, he was thrice awarded the Order of the Red Banner. In February 1921 he was transferred from his unit to study at the Frunze Military Academy. During that time, he contacted Polish Military attaché Colonel Romuald Wolikowski, to whom he passed Soviet military secrets. His espionage activities were discovered, and he had to flee to Poland.

During World War II, Kontrym served in the Polish 1st Independent Parachute Brigade and was one of the Cichociemni. He also fought with distinction in the Warsaw Uprising. After the war, he was arrested by the Polish Security Service and executed for anti-Communist resistance probably on 2 or 20 January 1953.

== Decorations ==
=== Poland ===
- Silver Cross of the Virtuti Militari (19 October 1944)
- Cross of Valour (Krzyż Walecznych), three times
- Commander's Cross of the Order of Polonia Restituta (2 August 2009, posthumously)

=== Foreign ===
- Croix de Guerre (1945, France)
- 1939–45 Star (United Kingdom)
- France and Germany Star (24 July 1946, United Kingdom)
- War Medal 1939–1945 (9 October 1946, United Kingdom)
- Order of the Red Banner – three times (Soviet Union)

== See also ==
- List of Poles
