= Gumniska, Podkarpackie Voivodeship =

Gumniska
- Village
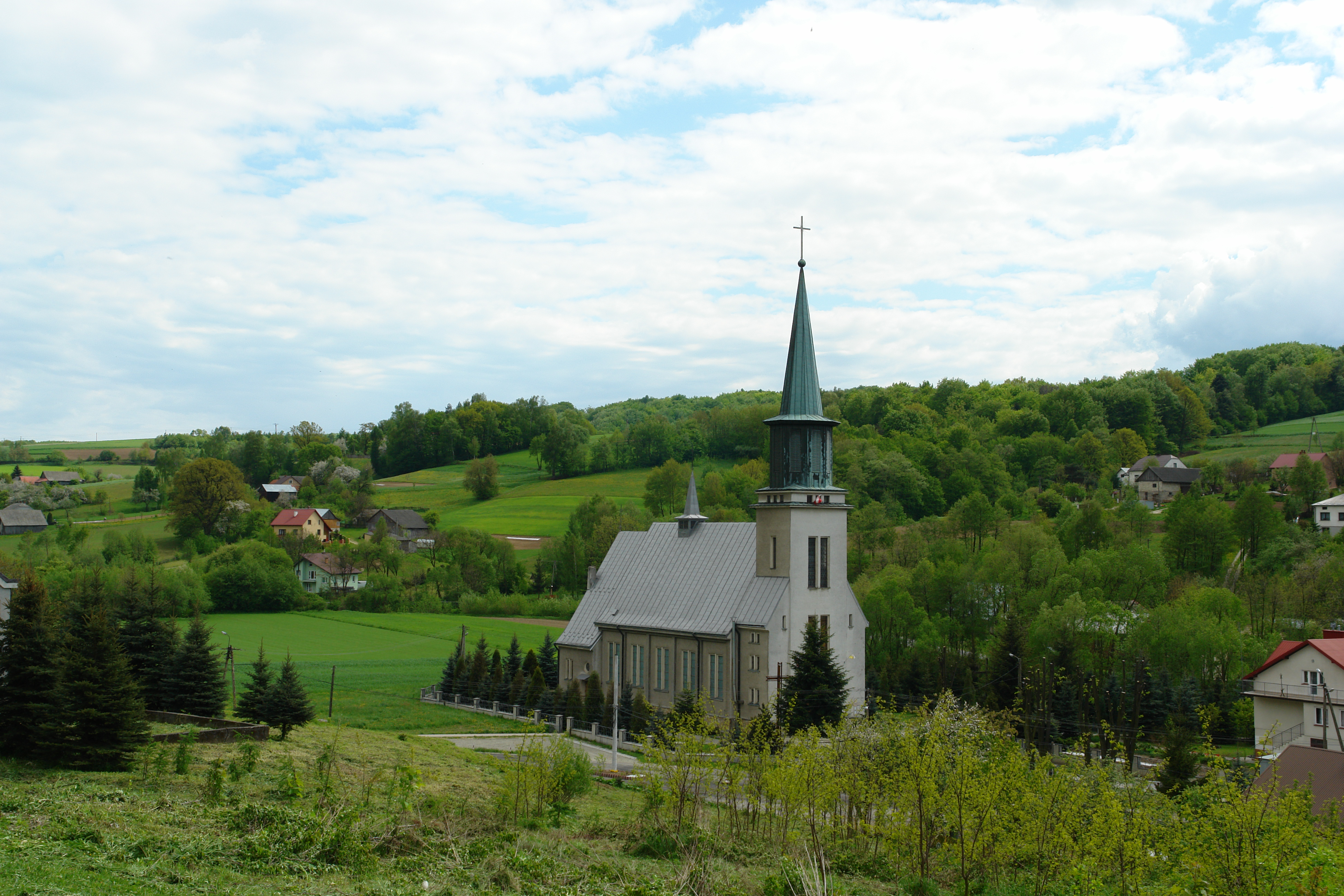
- Church of the Assumption of Mary

- Location within Poland
- Coordinates: 50°0′15″N 21°23′41″E
- Country: Poland
- Voivodeship: Subcarpathian
- County: Dębica
- Gmina: Dębica
- Population: 1,200
- Time zone: UTC+1 (CET)
  - Summer (DST): UTC+2 (CEST)
- Postal code: 39-208
- Area code: +48 14
- Vehicle registration: RDE

Gumniska [ɡumˈniska] is a village in the administrative district of Gmina Dębica, within Dębica County, Subcarpathian Voivodeship, in south-eastern Poland. It is located within the historic region of Lesser Poland.

Polish sculptor Tomasz Dykas was born in Gumniska.
