= Zawady, Warsaw West County =

Zawady
- Village
- Location within Poland
- Coordinates: 52°15′N 20°25′E
- Country: Poland
- Voivodeship: Masovian
- County: Warsaw West
- Gmina: Kampinos

Zawady [zaˈvadɨ] is a village in the administrative district of Gmina Kampinos, within Warsaw West County, Masovian Voivodeship, in east-central Poland.
