= Mokotów Prison =

Prison in Mokotów, Warsaw, Poland

Coordinates: 52°12′27″N 21°0′40″E

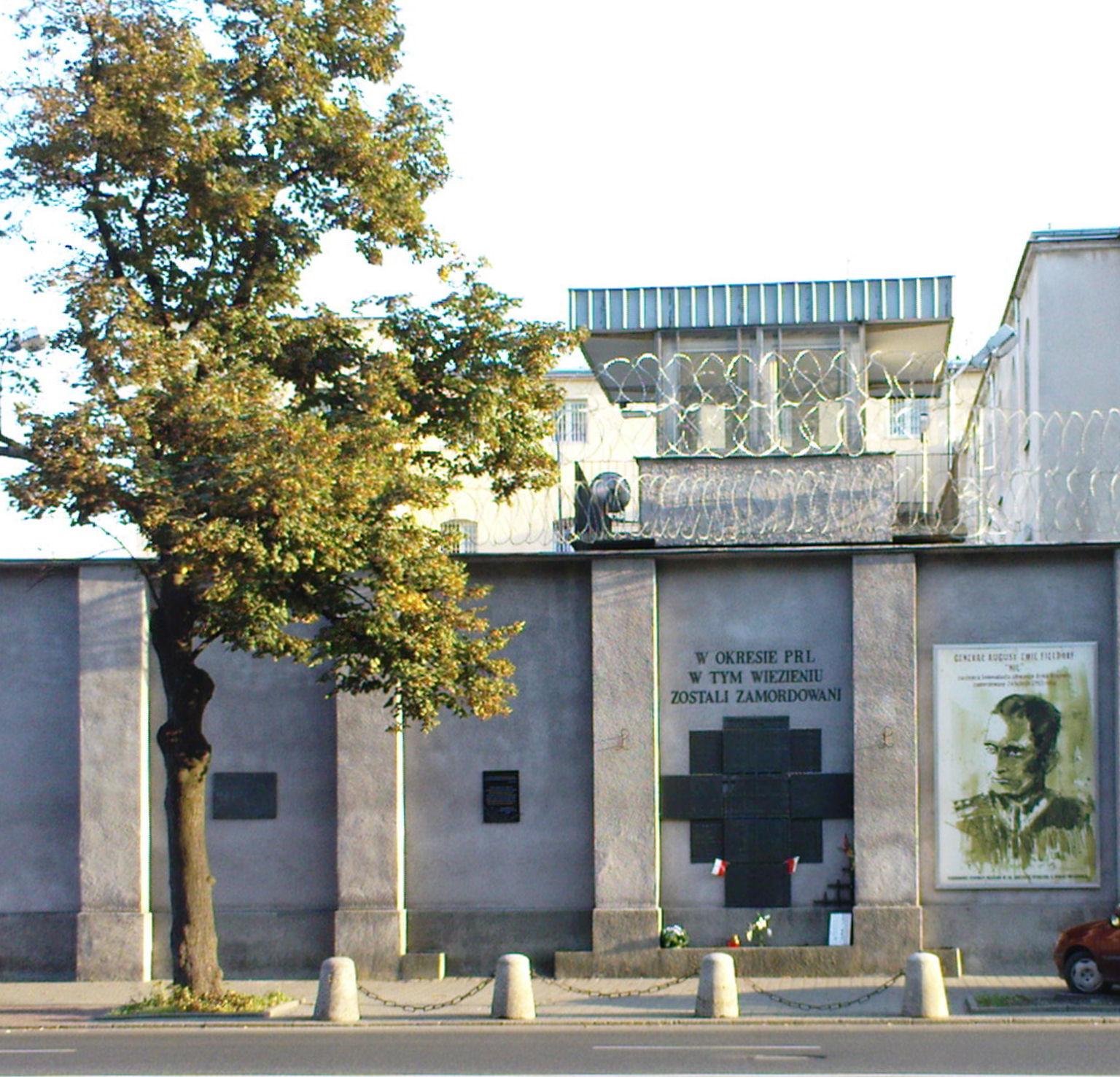
A plaque commemorating the victims on one of the prison's outer walls

Mokotów Prison (Polish: Więzienie mokotowskie, also known as Rakowiecka Prison) is a prison in Warsaw's borough of Mokotów, Poland, located at 37 Rakowiecka Street. It was built by the Russians in the final years of the foreign Partitions of Poland. During the Nazi German occupation and later, under the communist rule, it was a place of detention, torture and execution of the Polish political opposition and underground fighters. The prison continues to function, holding prisoners awaiting trial or sentencing, or those being held for less than one year.

== Before and during World War II ==
The Mokotów prison was built in early 20th century by the Russian forces, and was used by security and criminal police of Warsaw (see also: Tsarist Citadel in the Żoliborz district). After Poland regained her independence in 1918, the site was refurbished, and, until World War II, served as the main prison facility of the Polish attorney general's office.

After the invasion of Poland, the prison became part of the German District of Warsaw, in the borough, reserved for the German administration of the General Government and the German occupation army. The prison was one of several prisons of the Gestapo in Warsaw. It housed Polish politicians, freedom fighters, resistance workers and ordinary people caught in łapankas on the streets of Warsaw. The site became infamous due to constant torture of the inmates. It was known as one of the places of no return (Nacht und Nebel), from which the only way out was to the execution site, or to a German concentration camp. It was also a place of detention of innocent hostages, taken by Germans as punishment for actions by the Home Army. Later they were killed in mass executions announced publicly.

During the first hours of the Warsaw Uprising of 1944, the prison was attacked from the outside by the WSOP platoon of the GRANAT group of the Home Army. The partisans broke into the prison and liberated approximately 300 inmates. However, they did not manage to capture the entire prison and were soon counter-attacked by the SS forces stationed nearby and forced to retreat. As a reprisal, the SS and Wehrmacht murdered approximately 500 inmates. Until the end of the uprising both the prison and the area of Rakowiecka street were held by the Germans, despite numerous attacks by the Home Army. After the Uprising the German District was spared the fate of the rest of Warsaw and survived the war in a relatively good condition.

== Under Soviet domination ==
In 1945, when the Red Army finally entered the ruins of Warsaw – abandoned by the German troops – the prison was turned into a site of detention for Germans, as well as Poles who crossed the Soviet authorities, the NKVD and the local pro-Soviet Urząd Bezpieczeństwa. During the Stalinist years it was one of the best known prisons used by the secret police. The prisoners, kept in tiny concrete cells in inhumane conditions, were subject to interrogation and prolonged physical torture later described by Kazimierz Moczarski in his prison memoirs. Among those held there were German war criminals such as Jürgen Stroop, but also the members of the Polish underground, democratic opposition and intelligentsia, who were considered a threat to the regime of the Soviet-controlled communist government of Poland. After several months (or years) of mistreatment the detainees were usually either executed (in the old boiler room) and their bodies disposed of in the dump in Służewiec, or transferred to other prison sites in Poland, including the infamous Montelupich Prison in Kraków, Lublin Castle, and in towns of Wronki, Rawicz, Strzelce Opolskie, Sztum, Fordon and Inowrocław.

Most of the executions were carried out under the command of Piotr Śmietański, a notorious full-time UB executioner, nicknamed by the prisoners "The Butcher of Mokotow Prison." Among those held and executed in the basement-boiler-room of the Mokotów prison, often maimed and tortured beforehand, were:

- Witold Pilecki (executed)
- Hieronim Dekutowski (executed)
- Gen. Emil Fieldorf "Nil" (executed)
- Bolesław Kontrym (executed)
- Kazimierz Moczarski
- Zygmunt Szendzielarz (executed)
- Prof. Marian Grzybowski

- Łukasz Ciepliński (executed)

- See also 1951 Mokotów Prison execution of 7 officers of WIN

After the end of Stalinism in 1956 the prison was officially transferred to the civilian authorities, although it still served as a prison for political prisoners. After the Revolutions of 1989, the prison was transferred to the Polish law-enforcement agencies and currently it serves as a jail. In 1998 a memorial plaque was erected on the prison wall to commemorate the 283 known political prisoners executed on Rakowiecka Street between 1945 and 1955, as well as hundreds of others whose names and place of burial remain unknown.
