= Freedom and Independence Association =

Polish anticommunist organisation (1945-52)

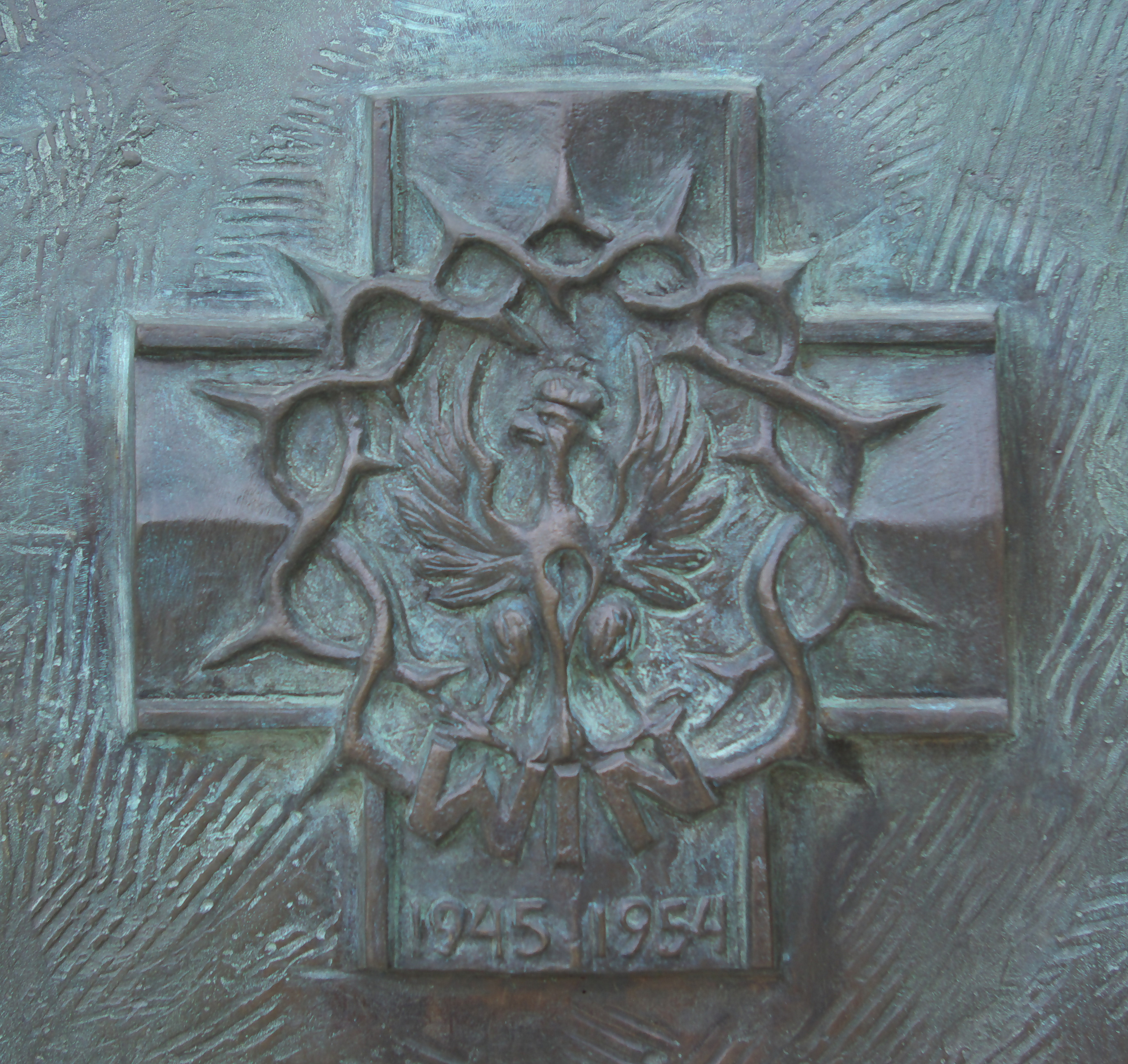
Monument in Rzeszów to Freedom and Independence members, with the WiN logo which incorporated a cross, crown of thorns and Polish eagle.

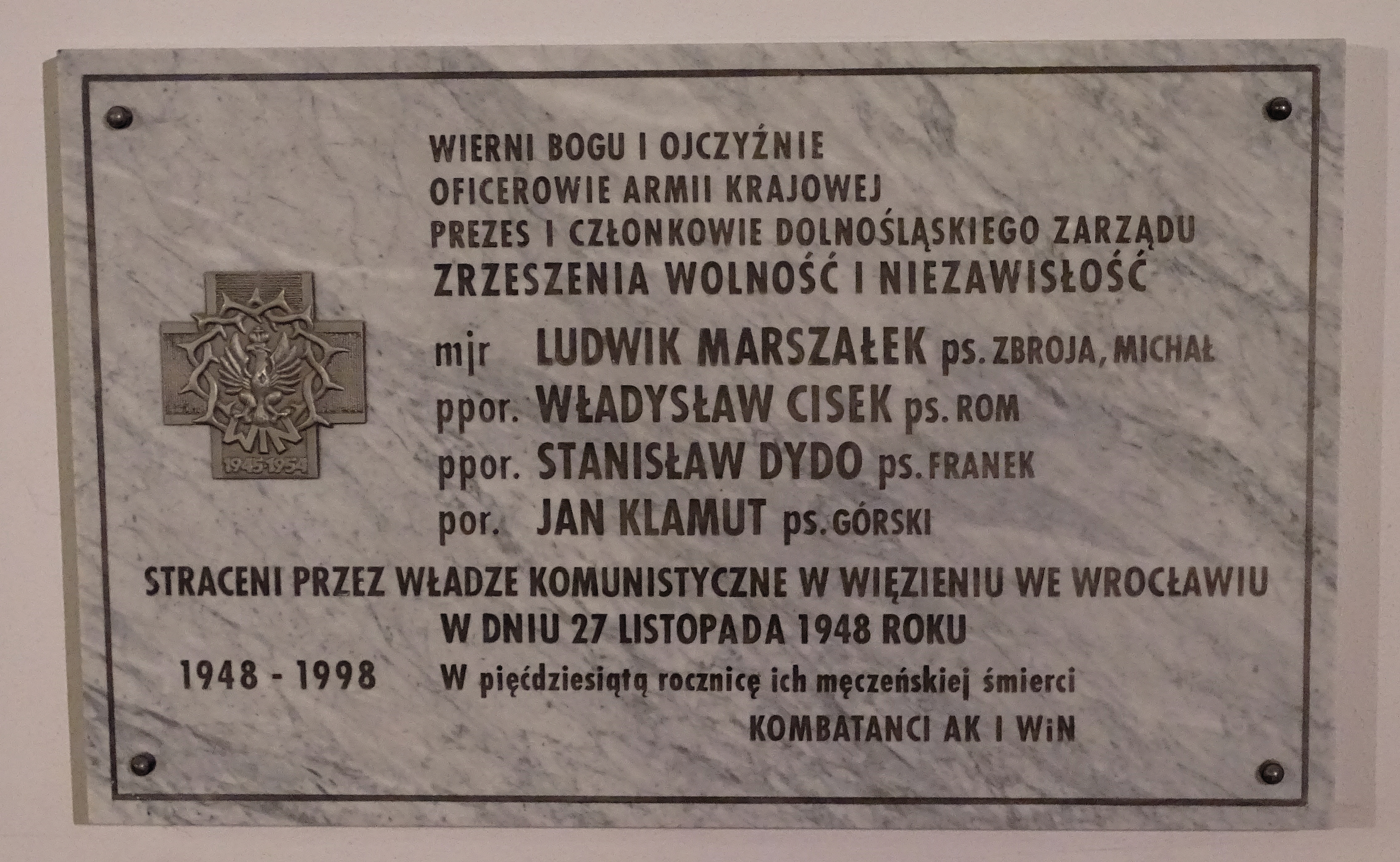
Plaque in Wrocław honouring the Lower Silesian unit of WiN.

Freedom and Independence Association (Polish: Zrzeszenie Wolność i Niezawisłość, or WiN) was a Polish underground anticommunist organisation founded on September 2, 1945, and active until 1952.

== Political goals and realities ==
The main purpose of its activity was to prevent Soviet domination over Poland and to fight communism. Although the pursuit of those goals was supposed to be largely peaceful, the fact of Soviet domination over Poland and the increasingly hostile and provocative behavior of local communists frequently resulted in WiN having its hand forced and in military confrontation. Although the WiN forces were well-armed and highly disciplined, they could not hope to fight a prolonged guerrilla war against the Soviet Red Army and NKVD units, a fact clearly understood by the leadership. Thus, to the extent possible WiN attempted instead to concentrate not on military action but rather on providing assistance (false documents and money) for former soldiers of Home Army, National Armed Forces and other Polish resistance organizations believed not to be allied with the Soviets.

== Initial activities ==
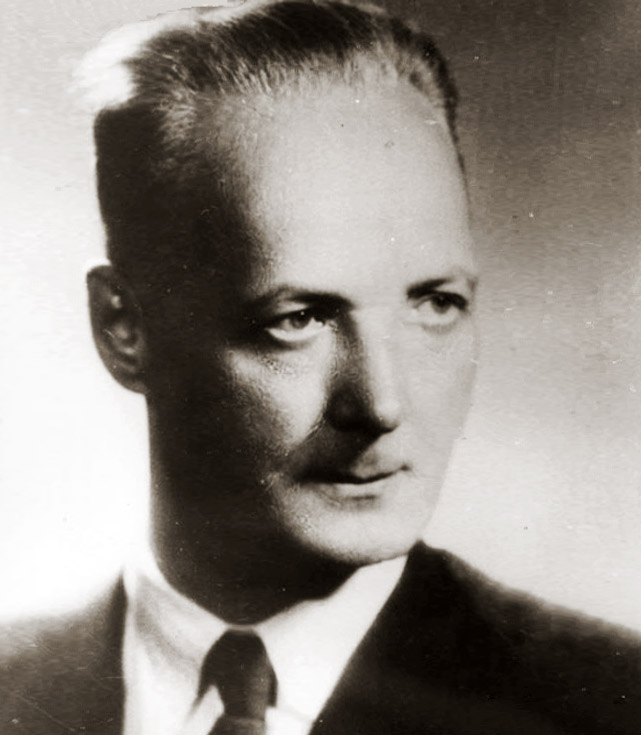
Col. Franciszek Niepokólczycki, one of the presidents of WiN.

The WiN was the first to carry the news of the falsification of the 1946 Polish people's referendum in an announcement to the United Nations Security Council. Members of the organization were persecuted by both the Soviets and the local communists. NKVD soldiers and Ministerstwo Bezpieczeństwa Publicznego agents carried out a bloody war with its 30,000 men in Mazowsze and Lubelskie region. The WiN's soldiers liberated many Soviet jails in Poland and killed collaborators and communist agents. However, the organization was penetrated by Urząd Bezpieczeństwa agents, and its security compromised as early as late 1945.

In 1946, the new WiN leadership decided to subordinate the organization's structures to the Polish Supreme Commander in the West. Simultaneously, it limited its support for the Polish People's Party, which had also been infiltrated by Soviet agents). Thereafter, the organization was run by former members of the Home Army.

WiN was initially divided into three different geographical operational theatres: Western, run out of Poznań; Central, run out of Warsaw; and Southern, run out of Kraków; the latter included Stanisława Rachwałowa as among its members. By 1946, that was reduced to Central and Southern. In January 1947 WiN called on the Polish People's Party to boycott the Soviet-sponsored elections and to await intervention by Western Allies.

In October 1949, Tomasz Gołąb, one of its members, founded the anticommunist underground organization of the Underground Home Army, which operated in Prudnik and its vicinity until 1952.

== Talks with Ukrainian underground ==
Despite protests by the DSZ leadership, recognizing their common origins and similar goals of ridding both Poland and Ukraine of the Soviets, WiN engaged in talks with the Ukrainian Insurgent Army (UPA). By spring 1945 in the Lublin region and Podlasie, the WiN had signed an armistice with the UPA. Occasionally, WiN and UPA cooperated in destroying Soviet establishments (such as in a joint May 1946 attack on secret police headquarters in Hrubieszów). Similar agreements were reached in May 1945 in Ruda Różaniecka, as well as April 1945 in Siedliska.

== Final days ==
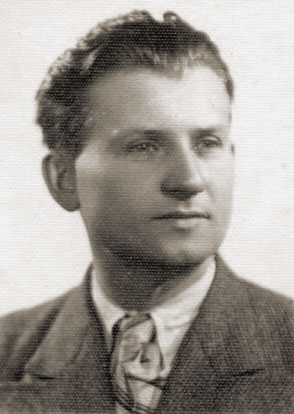
Łukasz Ciepliński, last president of WiN.

In April 1947, many WiN members came out of hiding to take advantage of an apparent amnesty issued by the communist authorities. Instead, many were killed. Members of the organization were accused of plotting the overthrow of the People's Republic along with the Polish leaders in the West such as General Władysław Anders and the CIA. The show trials for most of the leadership took place in 1947. The Communist repression apparatus under Jakub Berman and Stanislaw Radkiewicz exterminated most of the leadership, and by 1953, the organization had been destroyed. Nonetheless, individual units continued to fight for Polish independence until 1963.

Information published later indicated that one of the reasons for the failure of the WIN mission to Poland by the Gehlen Organization was that inside information had been provided to the Soviet Intelligence services by "moles". The Gehlen Organization was an intelligence agency that was established in June 1946 by US occupation authorities in West Germany and controlled by the CIA.

=== Presidents ===
1. September 2, 1945, to November 5, 1945: Colonel Jan Rzepecki
2. November 1945 to October 18, 1946: Colonel Franciszek Niepokólczycki
3. October 1946 to January 5, 1947: Lieutenant-Colonel Wincenty Kwieciński
4. January 1947 to November 1947: Lieutenant-Colonel Łukasz Ciepliński

== See also ==
- Cursed soldiers
- Emilia Malessa
- Attack on Hrubieszów
- Public execution in Dębica (1946)
