= Anti-communist resistance in Poland (1944–1989) =

1944–1989 resistance

Anti-Communist Resistance in Poland
- Part of the Cold War, anti-communist insurgencies in Central and Eastern Europe, and the Revolutions of 1989
Date	22 July 1944 – 22 December 1990 (46 years and 5 months)
Location	Poland, Territories of Poland annexed by the Soviet Union
Result	Defeat of armed insurgents by the mid-1950s Victory of anti-Communist opposition in 1989 after bilateral negotiations: Polish Round Table Agreement; Semi-free parliamentary elections held in 1989 and free presidential elections in 1990; Fall of Communism in Poland

Belligerents
Opposition movements: Armed insurgents (1944–1963); Cursed soldiers; Dissident movements; Solidarity (1980–1989); Anti-government protesters and strikers; Government defectors; Supported by: (Polish government-in-exile) Government-in-exile; United States; United Kingdom Western Bloc Holy See (from 1978) Catholic Church in Poland	Polish People's Republic Supported by: Soviet Union Eastern Bloc

Commanders and leaders
Łukasz Ciepliński (executed); Witold Pilecki (executed); Zygmunt Szendzielarz (executed); Romuald Rajs (executed); Józef Kuraś †; ...and others; Lech Wałęsa; Bronisław Geremek; Jacek Kuroń; Adam Michnik; Władysław Frasyniuk; ...and others	Bolesław Bierut; Edward Ochab; Władysław Gomułka; Edward Gierek; Wojciech Jaruzelski; Stanisław Radkiewicz; Jakub Berman; Czesław Kiszczak; Florian Siwicki; ...and others

Units involved
Armed resistance: Freedom and Independence; NIE; Citizens' Home Army; Peasants' Battalions; National Armed Forces...and others Civil resistance: Strike committees; Workers' Defence Committee; KSS KOR; ROBCiO; Free Trade Unions of the Coast; Fighting Solidarity; Orange Alternative...and others	Polish United Workers' Party; Polish People's Army; Internal Security Corps; Department of Security; Security Service; ORMO; ZOMO; Citizens' Militia

Anti-communist resistance in Poland can be divided into two types: the armed partisan struggle, mostly led by former Armia Krajowa and Narodowe Siły Zbrojne soldiers, which ended in the late 1950s (see cursed soldiers), and the non-violent, civil resistance struggle that culminated in the creation and victory of the Solidarity trade union.

== Armed resistance ==
- Cursed soldiers
- NIE
- Ruch Oporu Armii Krajowej

=== Freedom and Independence Association ===
The Freedom and Independence Association (Polish: Zrzeszenie Wolność i Niezawisłość, or WiN) was a Polish underground anticommunist organisation founded on September 2, 1945, and active until 1952.

=== National Armed Forces ===
The National Armed Forces (NSZ; Polish: Narodowe Siły Zbrojne) was a Polish right-wing underground military organization of the National Democracy operating from 1942 until 1947. During World War II, NSZ troops fought against Nazi Germany and communist partisans. In March 1944, the NSZ split, with one faction coming under the command of the Home Army while the other part became known as the NSZ-ZJ (the Lizard Union). This branch of the NSZ conducted operations against Polish communist activists, partisans and secret police, the Soviet partisans, NKVD and SMERSH, and their own (NSZ) former leaders. During the war, the NSZ fought the Polish communists, including their military organizations such as the Gwardia Ludowa (GL) and the Armia Ludowa (AL). After the war, former NSZ members were persecuted by the newly installed communist government of the Polish People's Republic. Reportedly, communist partisans engaged in planting false evidence, such as documents and forged receipts at the sites of their own robberies, in order to blame the NSZ. It was a method of political warfare practiced against the NSZ also by the Ministry of Public Security of Poland and Milicja Obywatelska (MO) right after the war, as revealed by communist Poland's court documents. Members of the NSZ, like other "cursed soldiers", and their families were persecuted during the postwar Stalinist period. In the fall of 1946, 100-200 soldiers of an NSZ unit under the command of Henryk Flame, nom de guerre "Bartek," were lured into a trap and massacred by communist military and police forces.

In 1992, acknowledging its contribution to the fight for Poland's sovereignty, Polish authorities recognized National Armed Forces underground soldiers as war veterans. The Polish Parliament Sejm passed a bill in 2012 commemorating the 70th anniversary of the creation of Narodowe Siły Zbrojne in 1942. Members of the Sejm who supported the resolution pointed out that NSZ members became the most obstinate target of repressions and hate propaganda by security apparatus under Stalinism.

- National Military Union
- Konspiracyjne Wojsko Polskie
- Armia Krajowa Obywatelska
- Armed Forces Delegation for Poland
- Poznań protests of 1956

== Civil resistance ==
- 1968 Polish political crisis
- 1970 Polish protests
- Dissident movement in the People's Republic of Poland
- Letter of 59
- June 1976 Polish protests
- Workers' Defence Committee - Komitet Obrony Robotników, KOR
- Movement for Defence of Human and Civic Rights
- Confederation of Independent Poland
- Solidarity
- Polish Round Table Agreement

== See also ==
- Polish government-in-exile
