= Cursed soldiers =

Term applied to a variety of anti-Soviet and anti-communist Polish resistance movements

- Żołnierze wyklęci
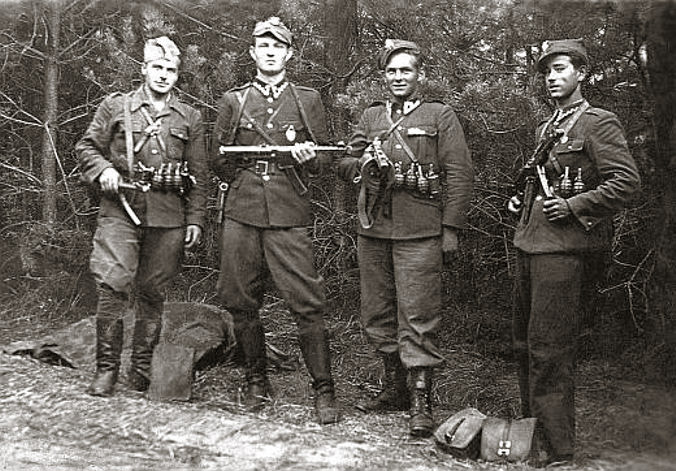
- "Cursed soldiers" of Polish anti-communist underground, June 1947. From left: Henryk Wybranowski - pseudonym "Tarzan" (killed Nov. 1948); Edward Taraszkiewicz - "Żelazny" (killed Oct. 1951); Mieczysław Małecki - "Sokół" (killed Nov. 1947); Stanisław Pakuła - "Krzewina"
- Dates active: 1944–1947
- Country: Poland
- Allegiance: Polish Underground State; Polish government-in-exile
- Ideology: Polish nationalism; Anti-communism
- Size: Varied, c. 150,000-200,000 at peak. After amnesty of 1947, 200-400 people remained in active, armed conspiracy.

The "cursed soldiers" (also known as "doomed soldiers", "accursed soldiers", or "damned soldiers"; Polish: żołnierze wyklęci) or "indomitable soldiers" (Polish: żołnierze niezłomni) were a heterogeneous array of anti-Soviet and anti-communist resistance movements formed in the later stages of World War II and in its aftermath by members of the Polish Underground State. The above terms, introduced in the early 1990s, reflect the stance of many of the diehard soldiers.

These clandestine organisations continued their armed struggle against Poland's communist government waged guerrilla warfare well into the 1950s, including attacks against prisons and state security offices, detention facilities for political prisoners, and the concentration camps that had been set up across the country. Most Polish anti-communist groups ceased to exist in the late 1950s, as they were hunted down by agents of the Ministry of Public Security and the Soviet NKVD. The last known "cursed soldier", Józef Franczak, was killed in a 1963 ambush.

The best-known Polish anti-communist resistance organisations operating in Stalinist-era Poland included Freedom and Independence (Wolność i Niezawisłość, WIN), the National Armed Forces (Narodowe Siły Zbrojne, NSZ), the National Military Union (Narodowe Zjednoczenie Wojskowe, NZW), the Underground Polish Army (Konspiracyjne Wojsko Polskie, KWP), the Home Army Resistance (Ruch Oporu Armii Krajowej, ROAK), the Citizens' Home Army (Armia Krajowa Obywatelska, AKO), NO (NIE, short for Niepodległość), the Armed Forces Delegation for Poland (Delegatura Sił Zbrojnych na Kraj), and Freedom and Justice (Wolność i Sprawiedliwość, WiS).

Similar anti-communist insurgencies occurred in other Central European countries. The "cursed soldiers" have prompted controversy over the degree to which individual fighters or their units were involved in war crimes against Jews or other ethnic minorities on Polish soil or against civilians generally. Common responses to such accusations have included that the accusations were partly or completely fabricated as communist propaganda to discredit the soldiers, or that any genuine victims were killed because of their involvement in, or cooperation with, communist authorities and that their ethnicity had little if any bearing on their demise.

== Historical background ==
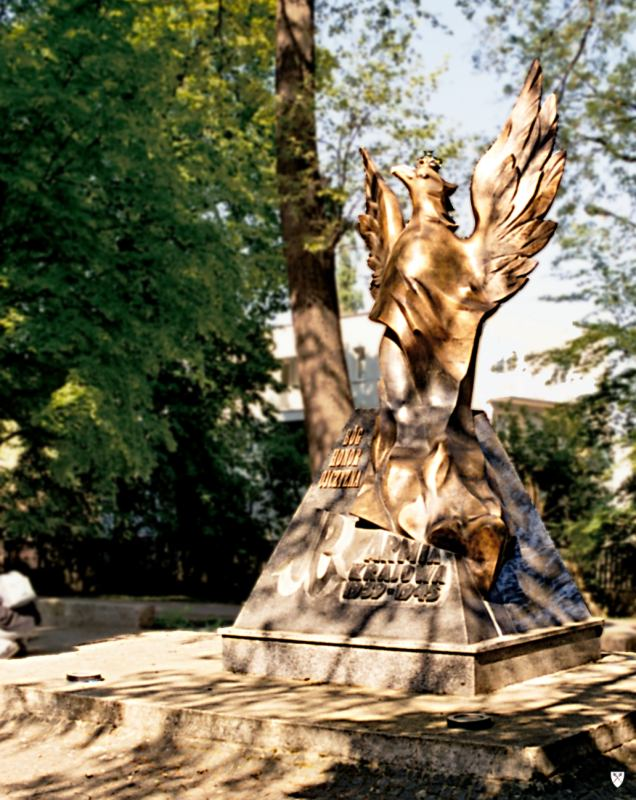
Monument to the Armia Krajowa in Sopot, Poland.

In the summer of 1944, as Soviet forces advanced into Poland, the USSR set up a provisional client state called the Polish Committee of National Liberation. The new government was aware that the Polish Resistance (whose chief component was the Armia Krajowa or Home Army) and Underground State loyal to the Polish government-in-exile would have to be destroyed before they could gain complete control over Poland. Władysław Gomułka, future General Secretary of the Polish United Workers' Party, said that "Soldiers of the Armia Krajowa (AK) are a hostile element which must be removed without mercy". Another prominent communist, Roman Zambrowski, said that the AK had to be "exterminated".

The Armia Krajowa officially disbanded on 19 January 1945 to prevent a slide into armed conflict with the Red Army and the increasing threat of civil war over Poland's sovereignty. However, many resistance cells decided to continue their struggle for Polish independence, and regarded Soviet forces as merely the new occupiers. Soviet partisans in Poland had already been ordered by Moscow on 22 June 1943 to engage Polish partisans in combat.

According to Marek Jan Chodakiewicz's review of Bogdan Musial's book Sowjetische Partisanen, "Musial's study suggests that the Soviets seldom attacked German military and police targets. They preferred to assault the poorly armed and poorly trained Belarusan and Polish self-defense forces. Soviet guerrillas torched and leveled Polish landed estates much more frequently than they blew up military transports and assaulted other hard targets." The main forces of the Red Army (the Northern Group of Forces) and the NKVD began conducting operations against the Home Army (Armia Krajowa, A.K.) during and directly after the launch of Operation Tempest, the Polish resistance's effort to seize control of cities and areas occupied by the Germans while the latter were preparing their defenses against the advancing Soviets. Soviet leader Joseph Stalin planned to ensure that an independent Poland would never reemerge in the postwar period.

=== Formation of the anti-communist underground ===
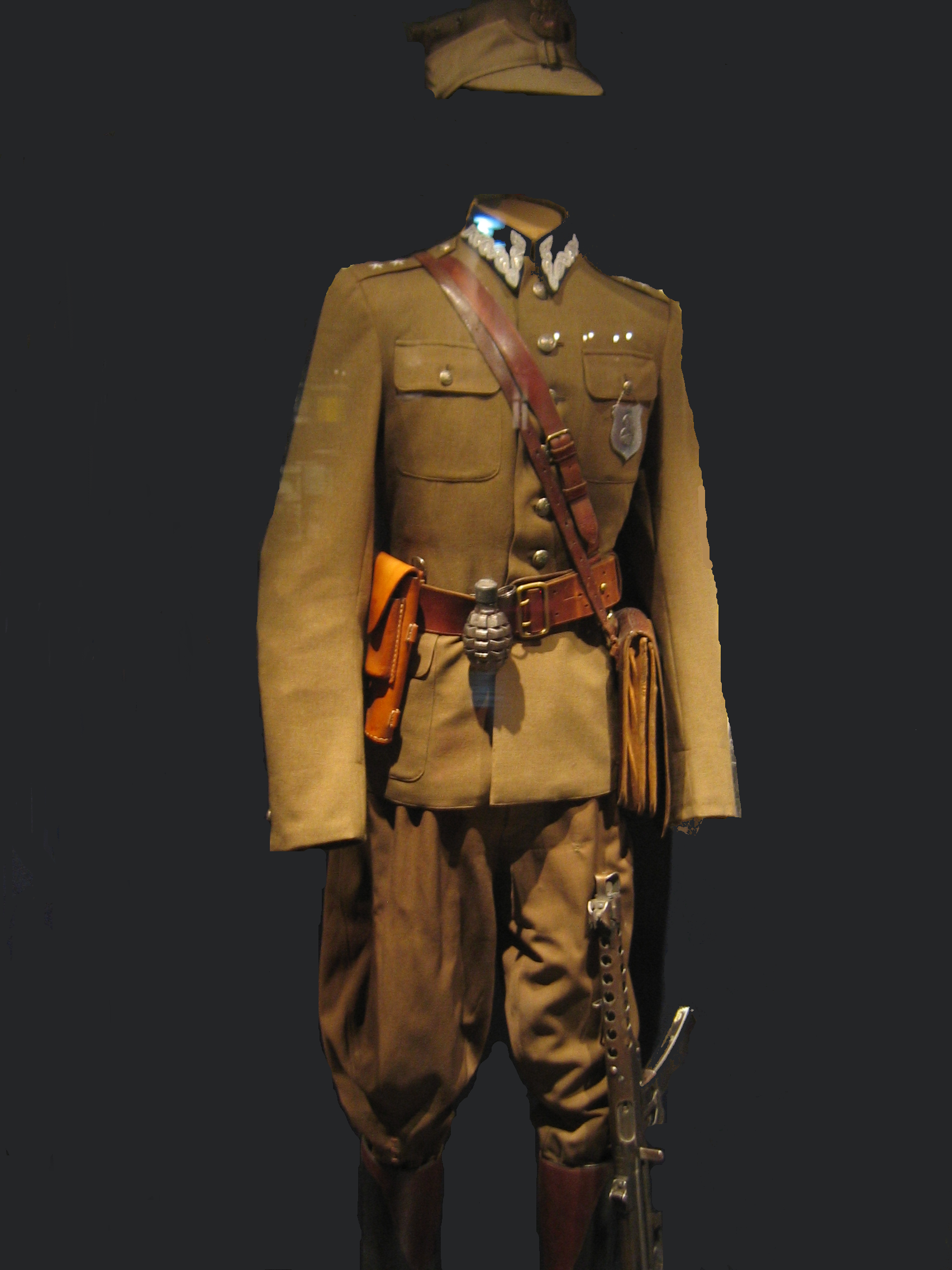
Uniform of a Polish anti-communist fighter, with breast badge displaying image of the Black Madonna of Częstochowa.

The first AK structure designed primarily to deal with the Soviet threat was NIE (short for niepodległość "independence", and also meaning "no"), formed in mid-1943. NIE's goal was to observe and spy while the Polish government-in-exile decided how to deal with the Soviets, rather than to engage in combat. At that time, the exiled government still believed that negotiations could result in a solution leading to Poland's post-war independence.

On 7 May 1945, NIE was disbanded and transformed into the Delegatura Sił Zbrojnych na Kraj ("Armed Forces Delegation for Homeland"). This organization lasted only until August 8, 1945, when the decision was made to disband it and cease partisan resistance on Polish territory.

In March 1945 a staged trial of 16 leaders of the Polish Underground State, captured and imprisoned by the Soviet Union, took place in Moscow (Trial of the Sixteen). The Government Delegate, together with most members of the Council of National Unity and the Commander-in-Chief of the Armia Krajowa, were invited by Soviet general Ivan Serov, with the agreement of Joseph Stalin, to a conference on their eventual entry into the Soviet-backed Provisional Government. They were presented with a warrant of safety, but the NKVD arrested them in Pruszków on 27 and 28 March. Leopold Okulicki, Jan Stanisław Jankowski, and Kazimierz Pużak were arrested on 27 March, and 12 more the following day. Alexander Zwierzynski had already been detained earlier. They were all taken to the Lubyanka prison in Moscow for interrogation before trial. After several months of brutal interrogation and torture, they were falsely charged with "collaboration with Nazi Germany" and "planning a military alliance with Nazi Germany".

The Polish Committee of National Liberation declined jurisdiction over former AK soldiers. Consequently, for more than a year, Soviet agencies such as the NKVD dealt with the AK. By the end of the war, approximately 60,000 AK soldiers had been arrested, and 50,000 of them were deported to the Soviet Union's prisons and prison camps. Most had been captured by the Soviets during or in the aftermath of Operation Tempest when many AK units tried to cooperate with the Red Army during their nationwide uprising against the Germans.

Other veterans were arrested when they approached the communist authorities after being promised amnesty. In 1947, the government of the People's Republic of Poland proclaimed an amnesty for most wartime resistance fighters. The authorities expected around 12,000 people to give up their arms, but the total number of partisans to come out of the forests eventually reached 53,000. Many of them were arrested despite the promises. After repeated broken promises in the first few years of communist rule, former AK members refused to trust the government.

After the Delegatura Sił Zbrojnych na Kraj ("Armed Forces Delegation for Homeland") was disbanded, another post-AK resistance organisation was formed, called Wolność i Niezawisłość ("Freedom and Sovereignty"). Wolność i Niezawisłość (WiN) was most concerned with helping former AK soldiers transition from life as partisans to that of civilians. Continued secrecy and conspiracy were necessary in light of the increasing persecution of AK veterans by the communist government. WiN was, however, much in need of funds to pay for false documents and to provide resources for the partisans, many of whom had lost their homes and entire life-savings in the war. Viewed as enemies of the state, starved of resources, and with a vocal faction advocating armed resistance against the Soviets and their Polish proxies, WiN was far from efficient. A significant victory for the NKVD and the newly created Polish secret police, Urząd Bezpieczeństwa (UB), came in the second half of 1945 when they convinced several leaders of WiN that they truly wanted to offer amnesty to AK members. Within a few months, intelligence gathered by the authorities led to thousands more arrests. The primary period of WiN activity lasted until 1947. The organisation finally disbanded in 1952.

=== Persecution ===
"The Giant and the Reactionary Spittle-Covered Dwarf". A postwar Polish communist propaganda poster showing a soldier of the Polish People's Army striding over a partisan of the Armia Krajowa (Home Army).

The NKVD and UB used brute force and deception to eliminate the underground opposition. In the autumn of 1946, a group of 100–200 "cursed soldiers" of the Narodowe Siły Zbrojne (National Armed Forces, NSZ) were lured into a trap and massacred. In 1947, Colonel Julia ("Bloody Luna") Brystiger of the Polish Ministry of Public Security proclaimed at a security briefing that: "[t]he terrorist and political underground" had ceased to be a threatening force for the UB, although the "class enemy" at universities, offices and factories still had to be "found out and neutralised."

The persecution of AK members was only one aspect of the reign of Stalinist terror in postwar Poland. In the period from 1944 to 1956, at least 300,000 Polish civilians were arrested. Some sources claim that up to two million were arrested. Approximately 6,000 death sentences were issued, and the majority of them were carried out. It is probable that more than 20,000 people died in communist prisons. including those executed "in the majesty of the law", such as Witold Pilecki, a hero of Auschwitz.

A further six million Polish citizens (i.e., one out of every three adult Poles) were classified as suspected members of a 'reactionary or criminal element' and subjected to investigation by state agencies. During the Polish October of 1956, a political amnesty freed 35,000 former AK soldiers from prisons. But some partisans remained in service, unwilling or simply unable to rejoin the civilian community. The cursed soldier Stanisław Marchewka "Ryba" ("The Fish") was killed in 1957, and the last AK partisan, Józef Franczak "Lalek" ("Doller"), was killed in 1963 — almost two decades after the Second World War ended. In 1967, long after the abolition of Stalinist terror, Adam Boryczka, the last member of the elite British-trained Cichociemny ("The Silent and Hidden") intelligence and support group, was finally released from prison. Until the end of the People's Republic of Poland, former AK soldiers were under constant investigation by the secret police. It was only in 1989, after the fall of communism, that the convictions of AK soldiers were finally declared invalid and annulled by Polish law.

== Largest operations and actions ==
The biggest battle in the history of the National Military Union (Narodowe Zjednoczenie Wojskowe, NZW) took place on 6–7 May 1945, in the village of Kuryłówka in southeastern Poland. In the Battle of Kuryłówka, the partisans fought against the Soviet 2nd Border Regiment of the NKVD, gaining a victory for the underground forces commanded by Major Franciszek Przysiężniak ("Marek"). The anti-communist fighters killed up to 70 Soviet agents. The NKVD troops retreated in haste, only to later return to the village and burn it to the ground in retaliation, destroying over 730 buildings.

On 21 May 1945, a heavily armed AK unit led by Colonel Edward Wasilewski, attacked and destroyed the NKVD camp in Rembertów on the eastern outskirts of Warsaw. The Soviets had incarcerated hundreds of Polish citizens there, including members of the Armia Krajowa.

=== Pacification ===
One of the biggest anti-partisan operations by the communist authorities took place from 10 to 25 June 1945, in and around the Suwałki and Augustów regions of Poland. The "Augustów roundup" (Polish: Obława augustowska) was a joint operation of the Red Army, the Soviet NKVD, and SMERSH battalions, with assistance from Polish UB and LWP units, against Armia Krajowa resistance fighters. The operation extended into the territory of occupied Lithuania. More than 2,000 suspected anti-communist Polish fighters were captured and detained in Soviet internment camps. About 600 of the "Augustów Missing" are presumed to have died in Soviet custody, their bodies buried in unknown mass graves on the present territory of Russia. The Polish Institute of National Remembrance has declared the 1945 Augustów roundup to be "the largest crime committed by the Soviets on Polish lands after World War II."

== Anti-communist resistance organizations ==
Among the best-known Polish underground organizations, engaged in guerrilla warfare were:

1. Wolność i Niezawisłość ("Freedom and Independence", WIN) founded on September 2, 1945, active to 1952.
2. Narodowe Siły Zbrojne ("National Armed Forces", NSZ) created on September 20, 1942, split in March 1944.
3. Narodowe Zjednoczenie Wojskowe ("National Military Union", NZW) established in the mid-to-late 1940s, active until the mid-1950s.
4. Konspiracyjne Wojsko Polskie ("Underground Polish Army", KWP) which existed from April 1945 to as late as 1954.
5. Ruch Oporu Armii Krajowej ("Resistance of the Home Army", ROAK) formed in 1944 against UB collaborators.
6. Armia Krajowa Obywatelska ("Citizens' Home Army", AKO) founded in February 1945, incorporated into Wolność i Niezawisłość in 1945.
7. NIE ("NO") formed in 1943, active till 7 May 1945.
8. Delegatura Sił Zbrojnych na Kraj ("Delegature of the Polish Forces at Home") formed on May 7, 1945, dissolved on August 8, 1945.
9. Wolność i Sprawiedliwość ("Freedom and Justice", WIS) founded in the early 1950s.
10. Tatra Confederation

== Events ==
- Battle of Kuryłówka
- Augustów roundup (Polish: Obława augustowska)
- Attack on the NKVD Camp in Rembertów
- 1951 Mokotow Prison executions
- Raid on Kielce Prison

== Notable members ==
The following list (in most part), was taken from the book Not Only Katyń (Nie tylko Katyń) by Ireneusz Sewastianowicz and Stanisław Kulikowski (Białostockie Wydawn. Prasowe, 1990); Part 10: "The Augustow Missing," compiled by the Citizen Committee for Search of Suwałki Region Inhabitants who Disappeared in July 1945 (Obywatelski Komitet Poszukiwań Mieszkańców Suwalszczyzny Zaginionych w Lipcu 1945 r., in Polish).

- Cpt. Józef Batory (noms de guerre, "Argus" and "Wojtek")
- Lt. Stefan Bembiński ("Harnaś")
- Maj. Marian Bernaciak ("Orlik" and "Dymek")
- Lt. Ksawery Błasiak ("Albert")
- Cpt. Franciszek Błażej ("Roman", "Bogusław", and "Tadeusz")
- Lt. Stanisław Bogdanowicz ("Tom")
- Lt. Col. Janusz Bokszczanin ("Sęk")
- Lt. Stefan Bronowski ("Roman")
- Cpt. Zdzisław Broński ("Uskok")
- Cpl Izydor Bukowski ("Burza")
- Lt. Karol Chmiel ("Grom" and "Zygmunt")
- Lt. Kazimierz Chmielowski ("Rekin")
- Lt. Col. Łukasz Ciepliński ("Pług" and "Ostrowski")
- Maj./Lt. Col. of NSZ Tadeusz Danilewicz ("Kuba", "Doman", "Kossak", and "Łoziński")
- Maj. Hieronim Dekutowski ("Zapora")
- Cpt. Jan Karol Dubaniowski ("Salwa")
- 2nd Lt. Władysław Dubielak ("Myśliwy")
- Brig. Gen.Emil August Fieldorf ("Nil")
- Cpt. Henryk Flame ("Bartek" and "Grot")
- Józef Franczak ("Lalek")
- Lt. Henryk Glapiński ("Klinga")
- Lt. Eugeniusz Godlewski ("Topór")
- Maj. Antoni Heda ("Szary")
- Lt. Col. Tadeusz Jachimek ("Ninka")
- Lt. Franciszek Jerzy Jaskulski ("Zagończyk")
- 2nd Lt. Henryk Jóźwiak ("Groźny")
- Cpt. Kazimierz Kamieński ("Huzar")
- 2nd Lt./Lt. Col of NSZ Stanisław Kasznica ("Wąsowski", "Przepona", and "Wąsal")
- Lt. Col. Mieczysław Kawalec ("Iza", "Psarski", and "Bronek")
- Lt. Jan Kempiński ("Błysk")
- Lt. Stefan Kobos ("Wrzos")
- Cpt. Jan Kosowski ("Ciborski")
- Lt. Karol Kazimierz Kostecki ("Kostek")
- Lt. Jan Kłyś ("Kłyś")
- Lt. Michał Krupa ("Wierzba" and "Pulkownik")
- Col./Brig. Gen. (posthumous recognition) Aleksander Krzyżanowski ("Wilk")
- Cpt. Ludwik Kubik ("Alfred", "Julian", and "Lucjan")
- Lt. Józef Kuraś ("Ogień")
- 2nd Lt. Adam Kusz ("Garbaty")
- 2nd Lt. Władysław Kuśmierczyk ("Longinus")
- Lt. Col. Wincenty Kwieciński ("Głóg")
- Maj. Adam Lazarowicz ("Klamra", "Pomorski", "Kleszcz", and "Zygmunt")
- Lt. Col. Henryk Lewczuk ("Młot")
- Lt. Col. Władysław Liniarski ("Mścisław", "Wuj", and "Jan")
- Lt. Stanisław Łukasik ("Ryś")
- Cpt. Władysław Łukasiuk ("Młot")
- Lt. Col. Józef Maciołek ("Żuraw", "Kazimierz", "Marian", and "Roch")
- Cpt. Jan Marawca ("Remiusz")
- 2nd Lt. Stanisław Marchewka ("Ryba")
- Lt. Józef Marcinkowski ("Łysy")
- 2nd Lt. Lucjan Minkiewicz ("Wiktor")
- Maj. Kazimierz Mirecki ("Zmuda")
- Cpt. Lech Neyman ("Domarat")
- 2nd Lt. Mieczysław Niedzielski ("Men" and "Grot")
- Col. Franciszek Niepokólczycki ("Szubert")
- Lt. Wiktor Zacheusz Nowowiejski ("Jeż")
- Lt. Col. Antoni Olechnowicz ("Lawicz", "Pohorecki")
- Maj. Mieczysław Pazderski ("Szary")
- Lt. Stanisław Pelczer ("Majka")
- Cpt. Witold Pilecki ("Witold")
- Lt. Franciszek Przysiężniak ("Ojciec Jan")
- Cpt. Romuald Rajs ("Bury")
- Lt. Col. Albin Rak ("Lesiński")
- Lt. Józef Ramatowski ("Rawicz")
- Cpt. Wacław Rejmak ("Ostoja")
- Maj. Zygmunt Rogalski ("Kacper")
- Lt. Jan Rogólka ("Grot")
- Col. Kazimierz Rolewicz ("Kama", "Ira", "Oko", "Mila", "Olgierd", "Zbyszek", and "Solski")
- Lt. Lechosław Roszkowski ("Tomasz")
- Lt. Col. Józef Rybicki ("Mestwin")
- Maj. Aleksander Rybnik ("Jerzy" and "Dziki")
- Maj. Józef Rządzki ("Boryna")
- Lt. Józef Rzepka ("Krzysztof" and "Znicz")
- Col. Antoni Sanojca ("Kortum")
- Lt. Col. Stanisław Sędziak ("Wiatr" and "Warta")
- Danuta Siedzikówna ("Inka")
- Cpt. Stanisław Sojczyński ("Warszyc")
- Sgt. Władysław Stefanowski ("Grom")
- Maj. Stanisław Szacoń ("Szacun")
- Lt. Col. Jan Szczurek-Cergowski ("Sławbor")
- Maj. Zygmunt Szendzielarz ("Łupaszko")
- 2nd Lt. Teodor Śmiałowski ("Szumny", "Grom", and "Cichy")
- Franciszek Andrulewicz, his sister Janina and cousin Witold were also murdered; and the family had already lost at least one relative at the hands of the Nazis.
- Maj. Jan Tabortowski ("Bruzda")
- 2nd Lt. Edward Taraszkiewicz ("Żelazny")
- 2nd Lt. Leon Taraszkiewicz ("Jastrząb")
- Lt. Col. Walerian Tumanowicz ("Jagodziński")
- 2nd Lt. Edmund Tudruj ("Mundek")
- 2nd Lt. Eugeniusz Walewski ("Zemsta")
- Cpt. Józef Zadzierski ("Wołyniak")
- 2nd Lt. Jerzy Zakulski ("Czarny Mecenas")
- Lt. Wacław Grabowski ("Puszczyk")
- Mieczysław Dziemieszkiewicz ("Rój")

== Gallery ==
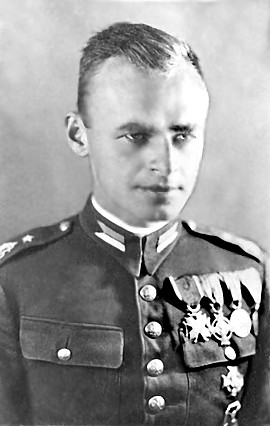
Witold Pilecki ("Witold")

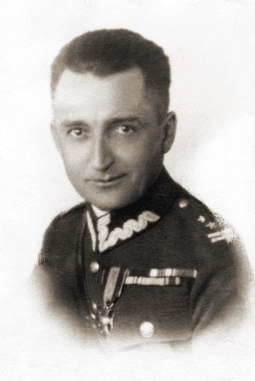
August Emil Fieldorf ("Nil")

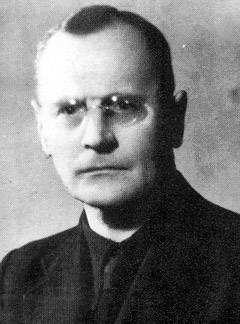
Aleksander Krzyzanowski ("Wilk")

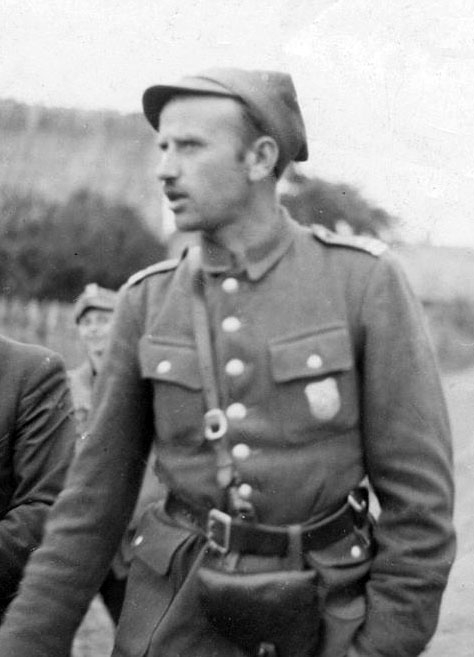
Zygmunt Szendzielarz ("Łupaszko")

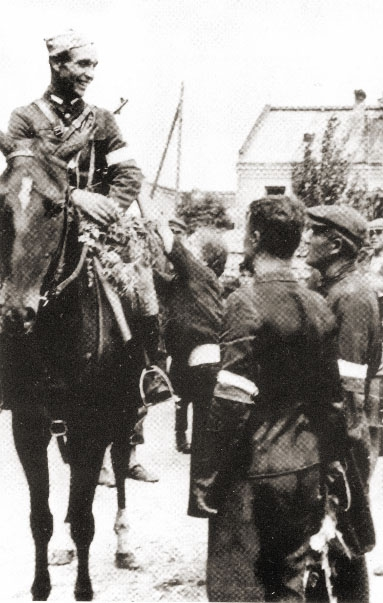
Marian Bernaciak ("Orlik")

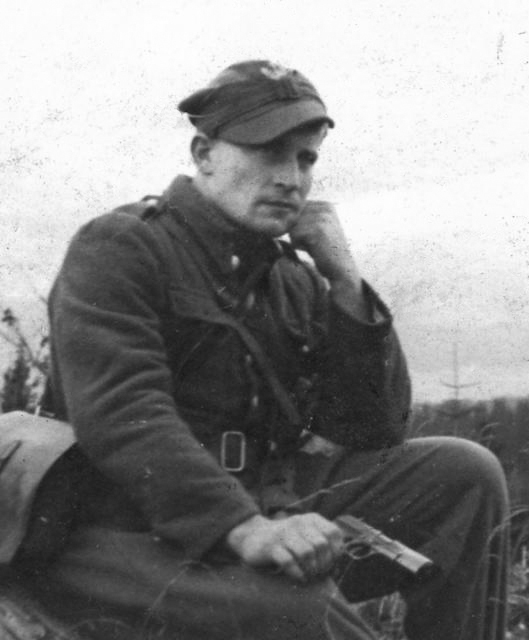
Lt. Józef Kuraś ("Ogień": "Fire")

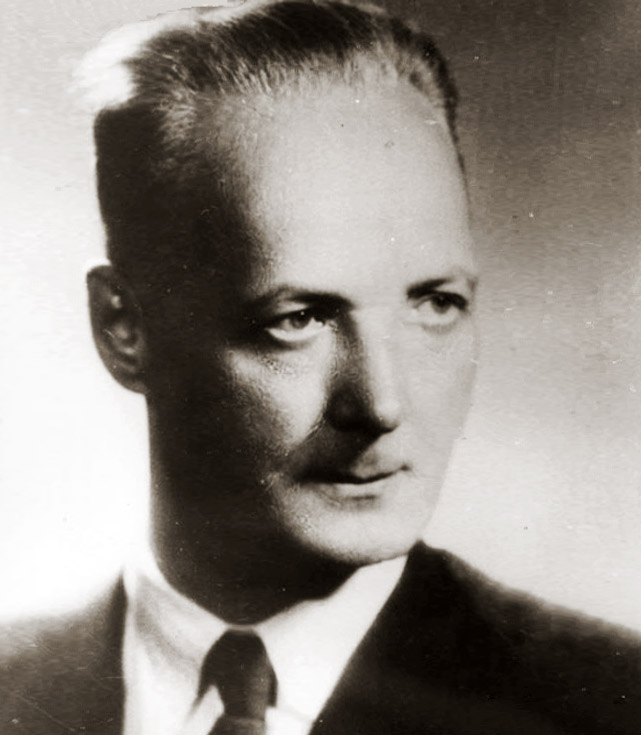
Col. Franciszek Niepokólczycki ("Teodor")

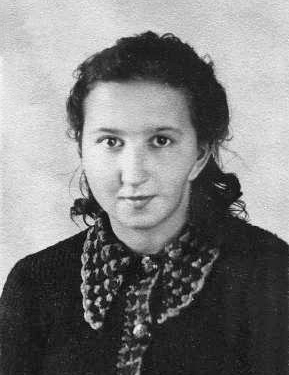
Danuta Siedzikówna ("Inka")

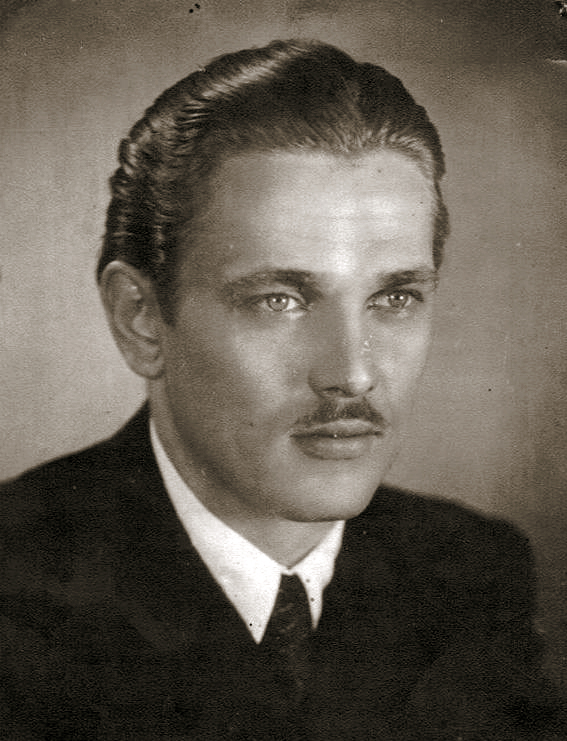
Henryk Flame ("Bartek")

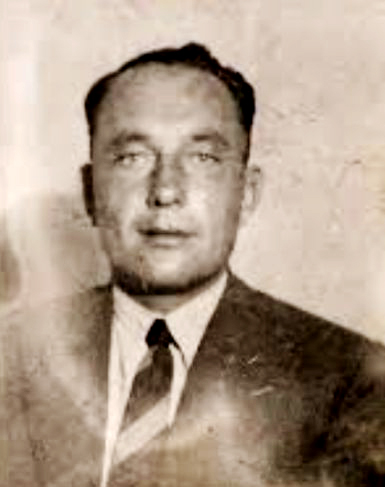
Władysław Łukasiuk ("Młot": "Hammer")

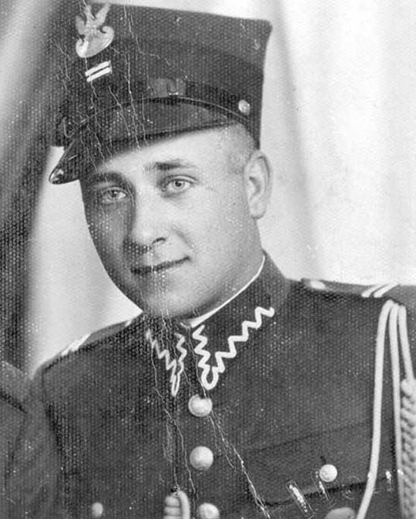
Józef Franczak ("Lalek")

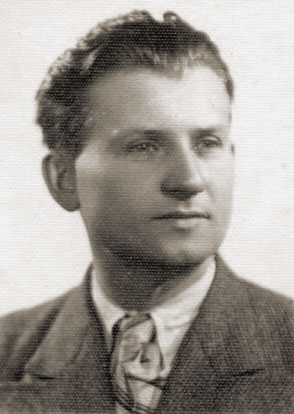
Łukasz Ciepliński ("Ludwik")

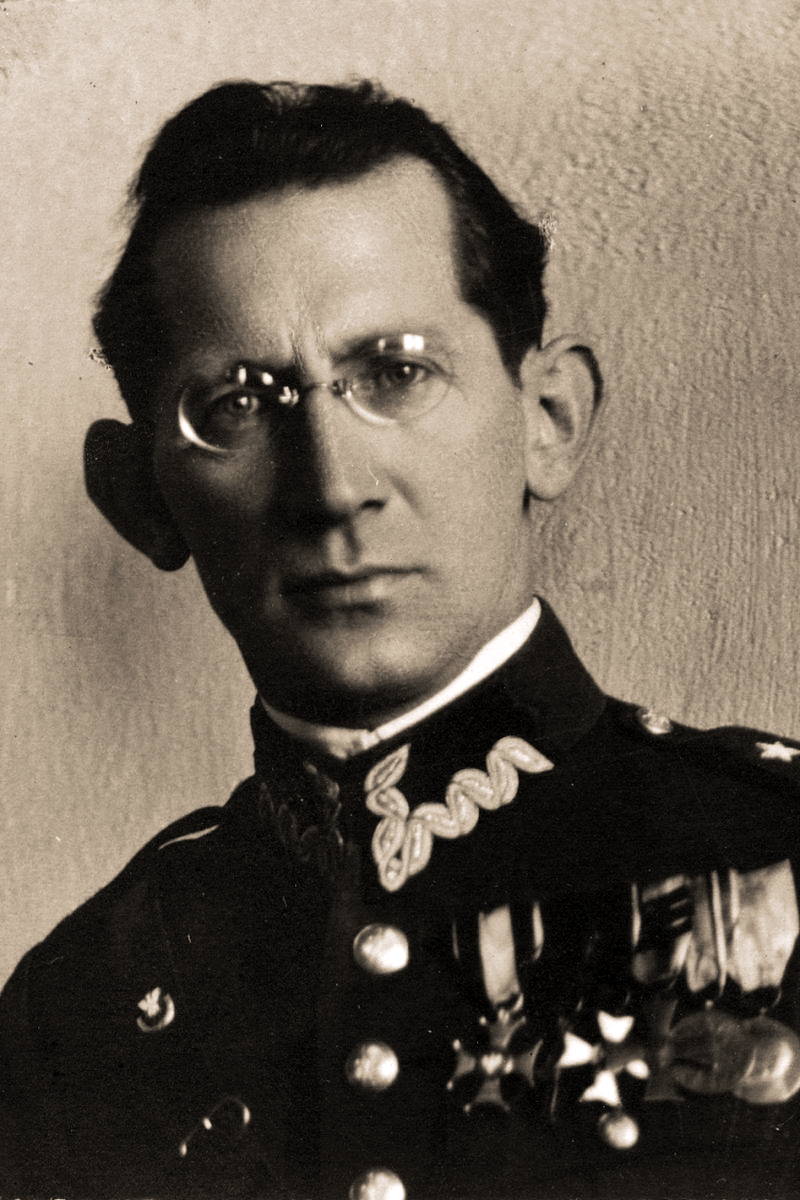
Wacław Lipiński ("Aleksander")

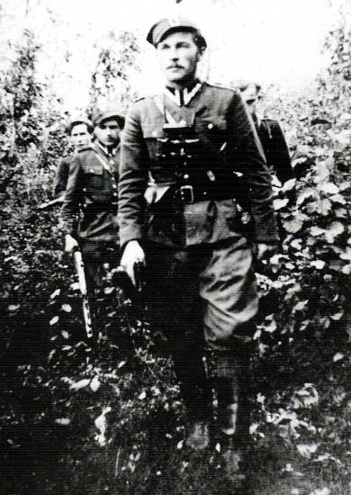
Mieczysław Dziemieszkiewicz ("Rój")

== Cultural references ==
The "cursed soldiers" served as an inspiration for numerous films, documentaries, books, stage plays, and songs and, in Poland, they have become the ultimate symbol of patriotism and heroic fight for fatherland against all odds. Notable examples include:

=== Film ===
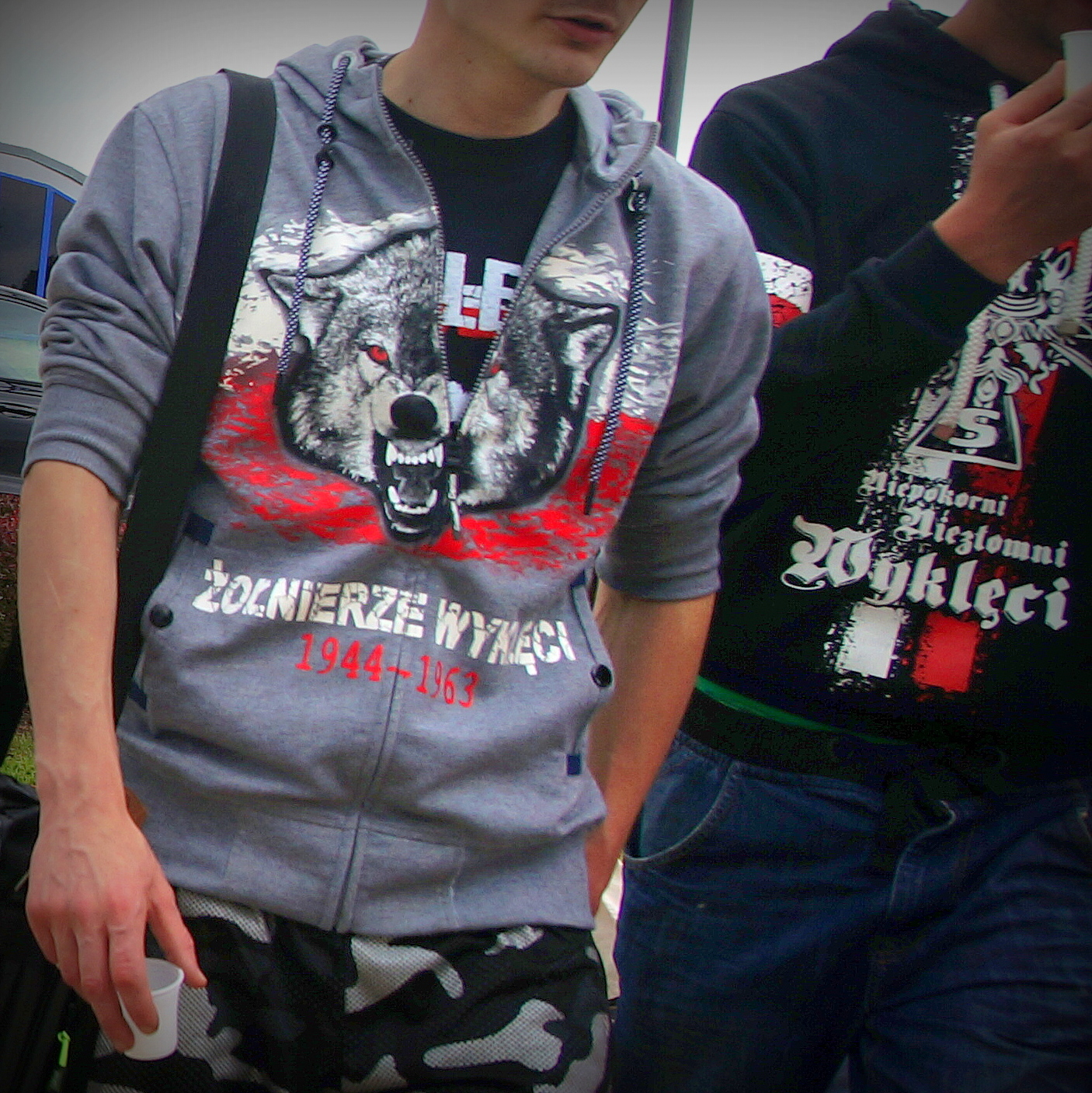
The "cursed soldiers" graphic design on patriotic apparel.

- In 1958, Andrzej Wajda directed the film Ashes and Diamonds whose main protagonist, Maciek Chełmicki, is a member of the anti-Communist underground in Poland.
- In 1990, Tadeusz Pawlicki directed a documentary film entitled Witold, which is dedicated to the life of Witold Pilecki, the author of Witold's Report, the first comprehensive intelligence report on the atrocities committed at the Auschwitz concentration camp. The film features interviews with Pilecki's wife and his children Zofia and Andrzej. It was broadcast on TVP2 and TVP Historia television channels.
- In 1995, Alina Czerniakowska directed a documentary in collaboration with historian Leszek Żebrowski on the Polish anti-communist underground after the end of World War II entitled Zwycięstwo ("Victory").
- In 1996, Tadeusz Pawlicki, directed the film My, ogniowe dzieci, telling the story of Józef Kuraś alias Ogień ("Fire").
- In 2000, Mariusz Pietrowski, directed Łupaszko, a documentary film on the life of major Zygmunt Szendzielarz (known as Łupaszko).
- In 2002, Grzegorz Królikiewicz directed a documentary film devoted to the life of Józef Kuraś entitled A potem nazwali go bandytą ("And Then They Called Him a Bandit...").
- In 2004, a documentary Against the Odds: Resistance in Nazi Concentration Camps was produced. It features the story of Witold Pilecki.
- In 2007, Jerzy Zalewski's film Elegia na śmierć Roja is dedicated to portraying the history of Mieczysław Dziemieszkiewicz.
- In 2008, Discovery Historia channel broadcast a two-part documentary entitled In the Name of the Polish People's Republic.
- In 2009, a documentary series Cursed Soldiers was produced by Discovery Historia.
- In 2013, Dariusz Walusiak's film Escape from Hell. Tracing the Steps of Witold Pilecki is dedicated to the escape of Witold Pilecki, Jan Redzeja and Edward Ciesielski from the notorious Auschwitz concentration camp.
- In 2014, Heroes of War: Poland was produced by Sky Vision for the History Channel UK and features the life of Witold Pilecki.
- In 2015, the TVP channel produced a documentary film Inka. Zachowałam się jak trzeba directed by Arkadiusz Gołebiewski and portraying the life of Danuta Siedzikówna, a Polish medical orderly in the 4th Squadron of the 5th Wilno Brigade in Home Army who was captured, tortured and sentenced to death at the age of 17 by the communist authorities.
- 2016 saw the premiere of Jerzy Zalewski's film Historia Roja starring Krzysztof Zalewski as the main character.
- In 2017, Konrad Łęcki directed Wyklęty ("The Cursed"), a film based on the life of anti-communist resistance member Józef Franczak.

=== Music ===
- In 1996, Leszek Czajkowski's album Śpiewnik oszołoma was published which includes a number of songs dedicated to the memory of the "cursed soldiers".
- In 2009, a Polish-Norwegian punk rock band De Press released an album Myśmy rebelianci ("We Are Rebels") honouring the legacy of the "cursed soldiers".
- In 2011, Polish hip-hop artist Tadek released a single "Żołnierze wyklęci" to pay tribute to the members of the anti-communist underground operating after the end of the Second World War in Poland.
- In 2011, a hip hop band Hemp Gru, released an album Loyalty, which features a single "Forgotten Heroes".
- In 2012, Obłęd band released an album entitled 100% Obłęd featuring a single dedicated to the Cursed Soldiers.
- In 2013, Polish rapper Ptaku released an album NaRa featuring a single "Żołnierze Wyklęci" with references to the lives of Józef Kuraś, Ryszard Kukliński and Rafał Gan-Ganowicz.
- 2013 saw the release of an album Panny wyklęte, a music project by Dariusz Malejonek in collaboration with Polish singers including Marika, Natalia Przybysz and Halina Mlynkova devoted to the contribution of female members of the anti-communist movement.
- In 2013, rapper Evtis released three singles inspired by the history of the Cursed Soldiers: "The Volunteer" (referring to Witold Pilecki), "Indomitable Heroes" (referring to Stanisław Sojczyński, Łukasz Ciepliński and Hieronim Dekutowski), and "You Acted Right" (referring to Danuta Siedzikówna).
- In 2013, Forteca band released an album Kto dziś upomni się o pamięć.
- In 2014, Joined band released a single "Zabrali mi ciebie Tato" ("They Took You Away From Me, Dad") devoted to the murdered soldiers of the anti-communist underground.
- In 2014, Swedish heavy metal band Sabaton paid tribute to Witold Pilecki in the single "Inmate 4859".
- In 2015, Horytnica band released a single "Rój", referring to Mieczysław Dziemieszkiewicz, one of the Cursed Soldiers.

=== Theatre ===
- On 15 May 2006, a stage production Śmierć rotmistrza Pileckiego ("The Death of Captain Pilecki") directed by Ryszard Bugajski and starring Marek Probosz had its premiere.
- On 22 January 2007, a play Inka. 1946 produced by Teatr Telewizji and diredcted by Natalia Koryncka-Gruz had its premiere in Poland.

=== Books ===
- In 2016, Polish historian Lech Kowalski published a monumental 1,100 page book Korpus Bezpieczeństwa Wewnętrznego a Żołnierze Wyklęci (English: "Internal Security Corps and the Cursed Soldiers"), which focuses on the fight undertaken by the communist state authorities against Poland's anti-Communist underground in the years 1944–1956.
- In 2019, Jack Fairweather published a book The Volunteer: One Man's Mission to Lead an Underground Army Inside Auschwitz and Stop the Holocaust whose subject is Witold Pilecki. His book won the Costa Book Awards – Book of the Year.

=== Politics ===
- In 2009, President Lech Kaczyński wrote that he aimed to "restor[e] the memory of the 'cursed soldiers'" during his presidency.
- In 2017, President Andrzej Duda wrote that he "pay[s] tribute to the heroes of the anti-Communist uprising" and he believes that "the memory of the 'cursed soldiers' strengthens in us Poles the will to persevere through these imponderabilia." He also added that "independent Poland makes efforts to properly honor its best sons".

== See also ==
- Anti-Soviet partisans
- Leśni
- Forlorn hope
- Forest Brothers
- Japanese holdout
