= Ksawery Błasiak =

Ksawery Błasiak (nom de guerre "Albert") (1900, Częstochowa – 1 August 1966, London) was a lieutenant of the Polish Army, of the Home Army and the anti-communist underground WiN.

Between 1930 and 1939 he was in the command of the Warsaw garrison. During the invasion of Poland he took part in defense of Warsaw. Between 1939 and 1945 he served as a leader of the Home Army in Rzeszów region. In 1945 he commanded the Third Brigade of the anti-communist WiN in the Bieszczady region. On 12 June 1946, he engaged in battle a large regiment of the UB and NKVD in which his group was dispersed. He himself managed to escape to England afterward, through the Czechoslovakia, Hungary, Italy and France. He died in 1966 in London.

According to the documents of the Institute of National Remembrance from December 1945 he was the adjutant of Captain Stanisław Sojczyński ("Warszyc"), commander of the KWP anti-communist paramilitary partisans.
