= Kazimierz Kamieński =

Polish resistance fighter (1919–1953)

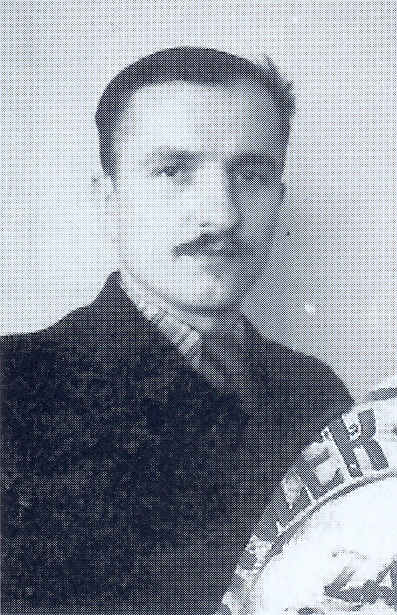
Captain Kazimierz Kamieński "Huzar", the last commander of the 6th Wilno Brigade

Kazimierz Kamieński (nom de guerre "Gryf" and "Huzar"; born 8 January 1919 in Markowo-Wólka, died 11 October 1953 in the in Białystok Prison) was an officer of the Polish Army, commander in the underground Polish Home Army (AK), ROAK and the anti-communist organization Freedom and Independence (WiN). He was one of the longest fighting soldiers of the Polish anti-Communist resistance after World War II.

Kamieński was arrested on 23 October 1952 in Warsaw by the Polish communist secret police. After a brutal investigation on 26 March 1953 the military district court in Warsaw, during the away session in Łapy, sentenced him summarily to six consecutive death sentences. He was executed on 11 October 1953 at 1:30 pm in the Białystok Prison. His symbolic tomb is located at a cemetery in Poświętne. It was only after the collapse of the Soviet Union that the district court in Białystok annulled his sentence on 13 March 1997. President of the Republic of Poland Lech Kaczyński decorated Kamieński posthumously with the Grand Cross of the Order Virtuti Militari on 11 November 2007.

== See also ==
Edward Wasilewski, Stalinist informant
