= National Military Union =

Polish anti-Communist organization

- Narodowe Zjednoczenie Wojskowe
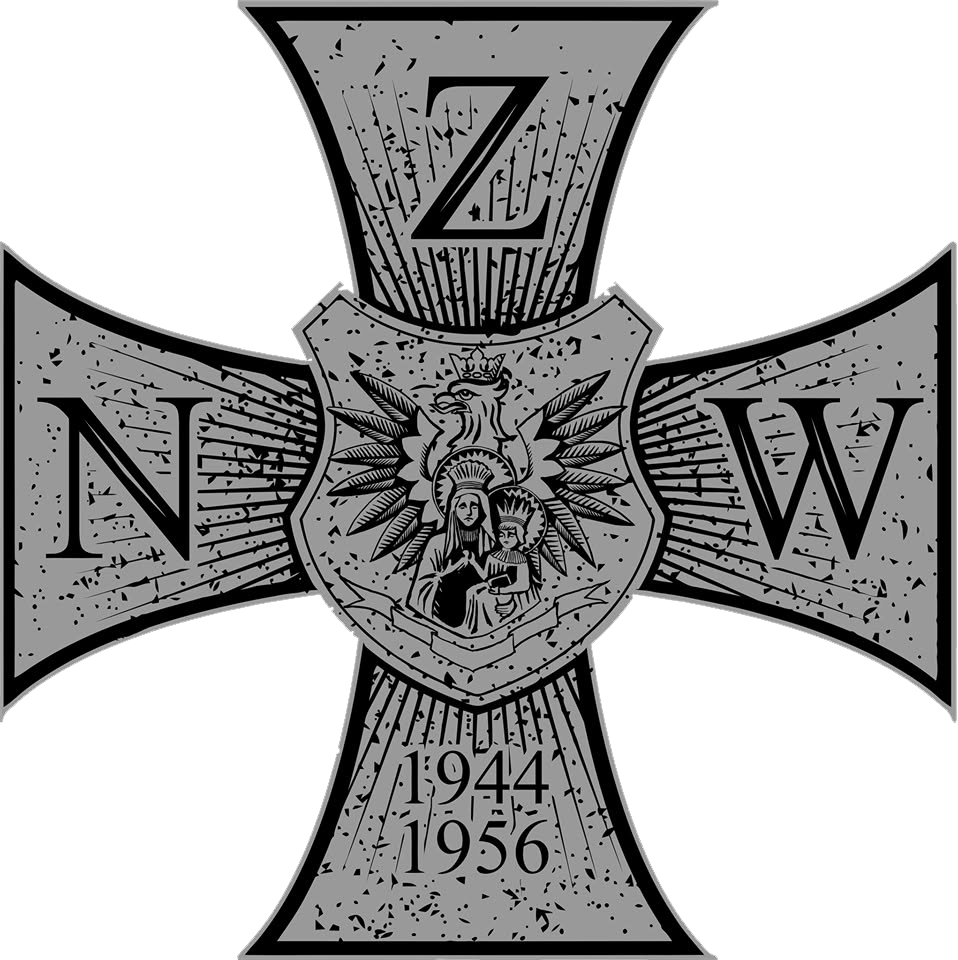
- Cross of the National Military Union
- Founder: National Party
- Military leader: Albin Rak “Lesiński” (until January 1945); Władysław Owoc “Paweł” (until March 1945); Tadeusz Danilewicz “Kuba” (until December 1945); Włodzimierz Marszewski, “Gorczyca” (until February 1946); Stanisław Banasik “Stefan” (until January 1948)
- Founded: November 1944
- Dates active: 1944–1956
- Country: Polish People's Republic
- Allegiance: Polish government in exile
- Headquarters: Łódź
- Newspaper: Walka (lit. ''Struggle'')
- Ideology: Polish nationalism; Christian nationalism; Anti-communism; Anti-Ukrainian sentiment; Antisemitism
- Size: 30,000 (1945 est.)
- Wars: Anti-communist resistance in Poland (1944–1953); Battle of Kuryłówka

The National Military Union (Polish: Narodowe Zjednoczenie Wojskowe; NZW) was a Polish anti-Communist organization, founded in November 1944, after the collapse of the Warsaw Uprising. It was among the largest and strongest resistance organisations established in the PRL in mid and late 1940s. The NZW was the result of a merger between the National Armed Forces and the National Military Organization. The NZW's name was intentioned to differentiate itself from the National Armed Forces. The National Military Union was aligned with and supported the Polish government-in-exile.

== History ==
Following the fall of the Warsaw Uprising in October 1944, the nationalist underground underwent reorganisation. The NOW had fought as an integrated part of the Home Army (Armia Krajowa, AK) and was effectively deconspirated in the process; its officers were dead, in German captivity, or dispersed. The rival NSZ formations were in a comparatively better position, having partially evacuated Warsaw alongside the civilian population. In November 1944, on meeting in Grodzisk Mazowiecki the National Party leadership decided to establish the National Military Union (Narodowe Zjednoczenie Wojskowe, NZW) on the basis of the NOW and NSZ-AK structures.

Development accelerated in spring 1945 as a direct response to the Sovietisation of Poland — symbolised by the arrest and trial of the "sixteen" Polish underground leaders, four of whom were SN members. By mid-1945 the NZW was estimated to number approximately 30,000 members, of whom 7,000 served in the Special Operations Unit (Pogotowie Akcji Specjalnej, PAS), the largest such formation in eastern and central Poland. The PAS engaged in protecting civilians from pacification operations, freeing arrested persons, and resisting the NKVD and the security apparatus (UB, KBW, MO). The NZW's combat record included notable engagements such as the Battle of Kuryłówka on 6 May 1945, where a unit under Captain Franciszek Przysiężniak inflicted severe losses on an NKVD detachment. In south-eastern Poland, units defended Polish civilians against UPA raids.

The activities of the National Military Union were based on the goal of restoring Poland’s full independence and the hope that Western powers would intervene against Soviet domination in Central and Eastern Europe. At the same time, some historians point to the involvement of certain NZW units in actions directed against the Ukrainian, Belarusian, and Jewish populations. The assessment of these events remains the subject of historiographical disputes concerning, among other things, the role of self-defense, retaliation for collaboration with Soviet authorities or for crimes committed against the Polish population during the Massacres of Poles in Volhynia and Eastern Galicia, as well as the influence of collective responsibility, the brutalization of war, and the conditions under which the armed underground operated in postwar Poland.

Relations between the SN leadership and the NZW were marked by internal tensions. Some avtivists argued for maintaining the military structure. The SN Presidium nonetheless formally ratified the appointment of Colonel Bronisław Banasik as NZW Commander-in-Chief in March 1946; his arrest on 14 January 1948 and subsequent death sentence — later commuted — effectively ended the NZW's coordinated national leadership.

Communist repression dismantled the organisation in stages. Mass arrests in March and April 1946, directed by Lt-Col. Józef Czaplicki on the orders of MBP Minister Stanisław Radkiewicz, destroyed the NZW Main Command. Part of the membership emerged from hiding under the amnesty of 1947; threatened commanders evacuated to the West. Some units survived in clandestinity considerably longer — the NZW district command in Bielsk Podlaski did not surface until 1956, and the last two partisans held out until 1959 and 1961 respectively.

== See also ==
- Cursed soldiers
- Anti-communist resistance in Poland (1944–1953)
- Romuald Rajs
- Mieczysław Dziemieszkiewicz
