= Delegatura =

Delegatura may refer to two Polish organizations:

- Delegatura Sił Zbrojnych na Kraj (Armed Forces Delegation for Poland)
- Delegatura Rządu Rzeczypospolitej Polskiej na Kraj (Government Delegation for Poland)
