= Edward Wasilewski =

Edward Wasilewski (1923 – 22 August 1968), pseudonym Wichura (Strong gale), was one of the best known anti-communist fighters in the Polish resistance during the Soviet takeover of Poland. Under his command, 44 underground soldiers successfully attacked the NKVD camp in Rembertów on the night of 20–21 May 1945, and liberated 700–1000 NKWD prisoners. Wasilewski was arrested on 26 March 1946 and, after a year spent in prison, was broken by agents of the Ministry of Public Security. He worked as an informant until 1960, denouncing many of his former colleagues. He killed himself by jumping out of a window in 1968, on the day of the Warsaw Pact invasion of Czechoslovakia.

DSZ officers: Henryk Salach "Grot", Edmund Świderski "Wicher", Edward Wasilewski "Wichura", Paweł Surowicz "Klon"

Wasilewski grew up in Stanisławów near Mińsk Mazowiecki. He got engaged in anti-Nazi resistance as early as December 1939 – being merely 16 years old. In the summer of 1940 he joined the underground scouting group Szare Szeregi, and became one of its organizers. He entered the Home Army (Armia Krajowa) with his scouting platoon. Simultaneously, Wasilewski continued his education in a clandestine secondary – which allowed him to pass the Polish high school exam. In the Home Army, he was assigned to combat division, where he served until the end of the German occupation. In 1943 he completed a clandestine course at a cadet school and received the rank of a platoon officer. In 1944 he was promoted to the rank of the Second Lieutenant and joined the forest battalion. He ended his fight against Germany with the participation in action "Burza" (Storm).

== Anti-communist civil war ==
Colonel Edward Wasilewski returned to his hometown and continued his underground activities in the Armed Forces Delegation for Poland (Delegatura Sił Zbrojnych). In spite of the young age (21 years) in February 1945 Wasilewski received an order from the commander of the Circumference Mińsk Mazowiecki to form an independent guerrilla unit and to commence self-defense activities against the Soviet takeover. Soon, his unit expanded from a dozen soldiers to over fifty, armed with 25 rifles, over 20 machine guns, pistols and 3 anti-tank rifles. Together, they destroyed several MO and NKVD strongholds, and on 20–21 May 1945 liberated the camp in Rembertów.

Arrested after a mock amnesty and persecuted, Wasilewski became a Stalinist informant in September 1950 while suffering from depression. He joined the Department 3 of MBP in May 1951, and in the following years took part in many anti-partisan operations, resulting in capture and execution of numerous underground fighters including Kazimierz Kamieński "Huzar", and Jan Kmiołek with dozens of others. He drank heavily and contracted tuberculosis. He was laid off from MBP in April 1960, got a job as a petty journalist (never under a real name), and killed himself eight years later, on 22 August 1968.

== See also ==
- Ludwik Kalkstein, Stalininst informant with Urzad Bezpieczenstwa

== Notes and references ==
- Artykuły historyczne. Fundacja Pamietamy. 5 May 2010.
- "Mazowsze i Podlasie w ogniu 1944-1956, powiat Pułtusk". Solidarność Walcząca – Warszawa
- "Huzar – Testament Jana Warpechowskiego, czyli jak zdradzono Kazimierza Kamieńskiego." Ciechanowiec OnLine, 26 January 2007. Archived 7 November 2011 at the Wayback Machine
