= Franciszek Przysiężniak =

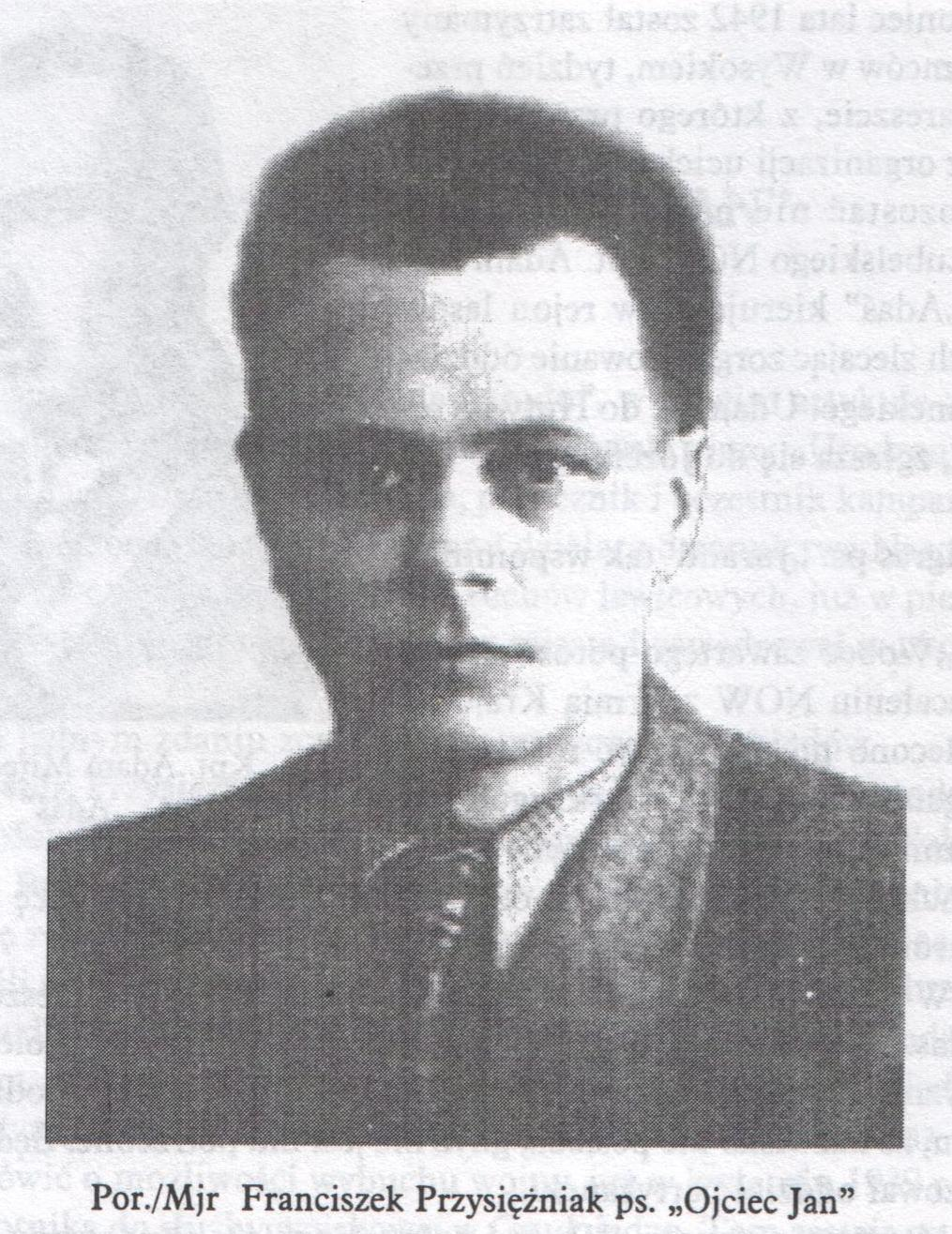
Franciszek Przysiężniak

Franciszek Przysiężniak (nom de guerre "Ojciec Jan", "Father John") (22 September 1909 in the village of Krupe, near Krasnystaw – 30 September 1975 in Jarosław) - was a lieutenant in the Polish Army, an officer of anti-communist resistance groups National Military Organization (NOW) and National Military Union (NZW).

Przysiężniak finished the Volhynian School for Reserve Cadets of Artillery in Włodzimierz Wołyński in 1938. He then began his military service in the 16th Pomeranian Regiment of Light Artillery in Grudziądz. He took part in the Invasion of Poland in 1939, against the Nazi invaders. On 28 September 1939, he was captured by the Germans at Tomaszów Lubelski, but on his way to the POW camp he managed to escape. In 1942 he joined the National Military Organization and was made the commander of its units in the Krasnystaw county. He headed a unit that specialized in diversion and sabotage which later the merger with the Home Army (AK-NOW). Eventually, he was promoted to the rank of major.

During World War II, the partisan unit led by "Father John", which operated in the region of Janów Forests was one of the best armed units of the Polish anti-Nazi underground. On 14 June 1944, under his leadership it took part in one of the largest battles between German forces and Polish partisans, at Porytowe Wzgorze which was part of the Sturmwind I operation carried out by the Nazis.

After the Red Army entered Poland he was forced to go into hiding. In April 1945 in Kuryłówka his wife, Janina Przysiężniak Jaga, who was seven months pregnant was murdered, with a shot to the back of the head, by the communist secret police (UB). As a result, he organized a group of anti-communist fighters in the "San" region. On 7 May this unit fought in one of the largest battles between Soviet NKVD and the Polish underground, the Battle of Kuryłówka, in which 57 NKVD soldiers were killed and their operational group dispersed. In the fall of 1945 he moved to Pomerania where he was made the commander of all NZW units in Brodnica and Wąbrzeźno counties. He was arrested on 15 May 1946, and sentenced to four years in prison. He was released during the Amnesty of 1947, but a year later arrested again. This time his sentence was 15 years in prison. He was released again on 24 December 1954.

He was a recipient of the Silver Cross of the Virtuti Militari.
