= Mieczysław Dziemieszkiewicz =

Polish soldier, anti-communist resistance member

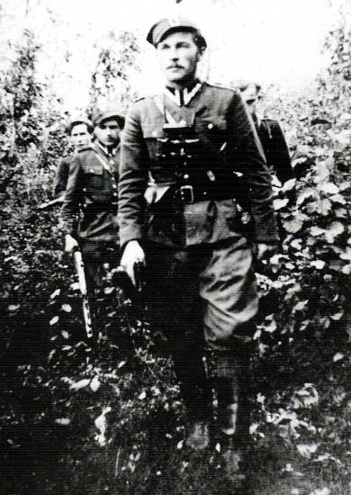
- Born: 25 January 1925; Zagroby, Białystok Voivodeship, Second Polish Republic
- Died: 14 April 1951 (aged 26); Szyszki, Warsaw Voivodeship, Republic of Poland
- Burial place: Powązki Cemetery
- Military career
- Branch: LWP (1945); NZS-NZW (1945-51)
- Military engagement: 1945-51
- Posthumous rank: Podporuchik
- Nickname: Rój
- Unit: Extraordinary Special Actions
- Conflicts: Eastern Front; Anti-communist insurgency
- Awards: Cross of Valour; Order of Polonia Restituta

Mieczysław "Rój" Dziemieszkiewicz (25 January 1925 – 14 April 1951) was a soldier of the National Armed Forces (NZS) and the National Military Union (NZW) in Poland, an anti-communist activist of the Polish underground in northern Masovia.

== Early life ==
Dziemieszkiewicz was born on January 25, 1925, in Zagroby, Białystok Voivodeship, Poland. The son of Adam and Stefania (née Świerczewska), in 1939 he graduated from public school in Różan. During the occupation, he attended secret teaching courses in Mackeim, while working at the German transport company.

== World War II ==
In the spring of 1945, Dziemieszkiewicz was drafted into Reserve Infantry Regiment 1 (a reserve infantry unit of the LWP) in Warsaw, where he heard the news of the death of his brother, who was murdered during a robbery by Soviet soldiers in November 1945. He then deserted his post and fled. Soon after he joined the NZS-NZW branch led by Marian "Burza" Kraśniewski, where he got his nom de guerre Rój (transl. Swarm). Initially, he was a link between the command of the district and the command of the county. In 1948 Dziemieszkiewicz was promoted to the rank of Sergeant. By order of the company commander Marian "Walter" Koźniewski, in response to the mass arrests ordered by the Security Office (UB), Rój formed the Extraordinary Special Actions unit (Pogotowie Akcji Specjalnej), which he became the head of. As commander of the new unit, he began to carry out many actions against the communists, their special forces and agents.

== Death ==
Dziemieszkiewicz's death was caused by his fiancée. The UB were holding her parents in custody, and she was forced to give up the whereabouts of Rój. He was killed when he tried to escape from the authorities. Dziemieszkiewicz's struggle against the communists was depicted in the 2016 Polish film, Historia Roja. In July 2026 the Institute of National Remembrance announced that the remains of Dziemieszkiewicz had been found in an anonymous grave at the Powązki Cemetery. The body was initially identified by a beret insignia, which was later corroborated by DNA analysis carried out by researchers at the Pomeranian Medical University.

== See also ==
- Polish contribution to World War II
