= Battle of Kuryłówka =

1945 battle in Poland

Coordinates: 50°17′50″N 22°27′53″E

- Part of Anti-communist resistance in Poland (1944–1946)
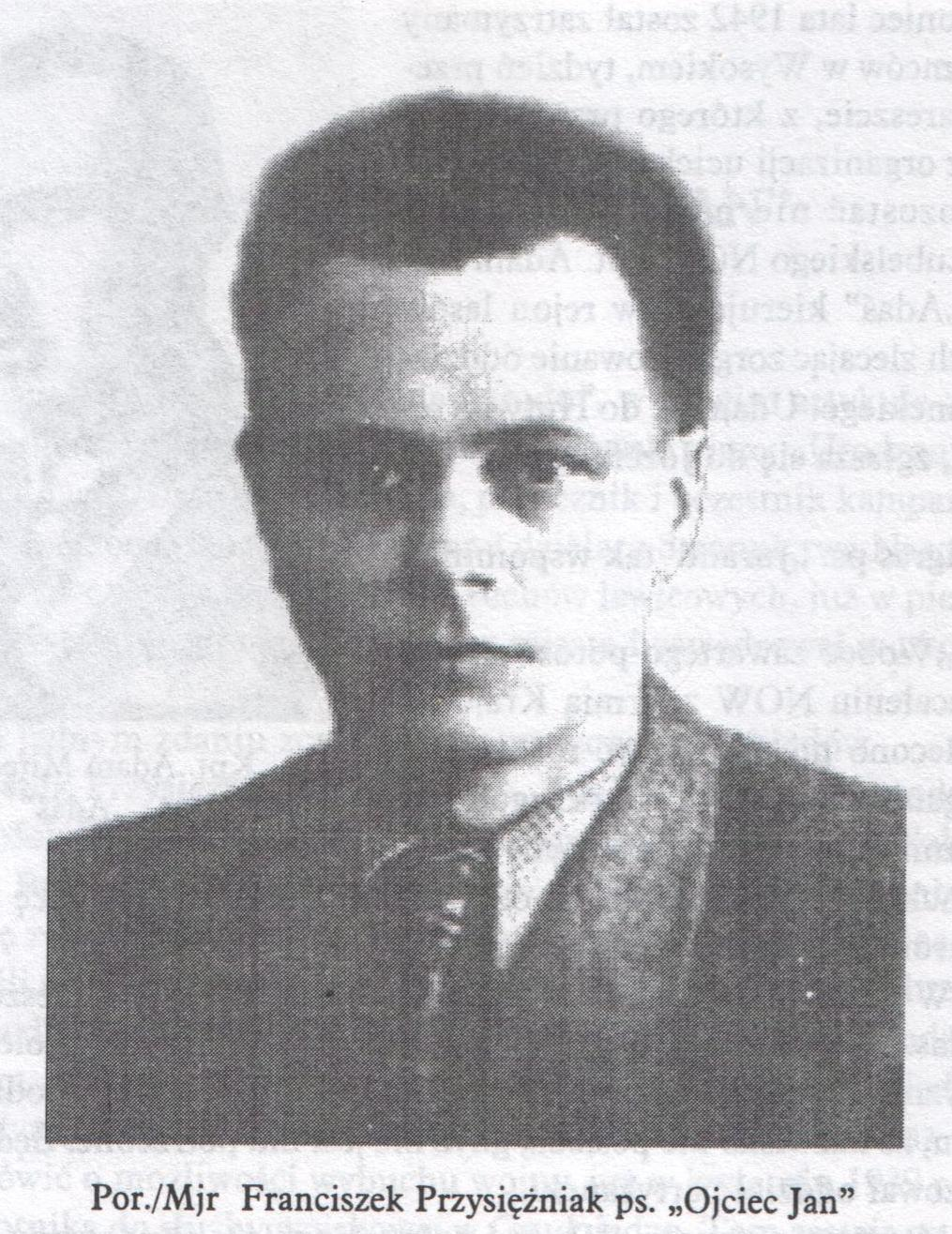
- Franciszek Przysiężniak
Date	May 7, 1945
Location	Kuryłówka, near Leżajsk, Poland
Result	Polish victory

Belligerents
NKVD	Polish Underground

Commanders and leaders
Unknown	Major Przysiężniak; Józef Zadzierski

Strength
Two companies, around 300 men	200 soldiers

Casualties and losses
56–70 agents	Unknown

The Battle of Kuryłówka, was fought between the Polish anti-communist resistance organization, National Military Alliance (NZW) and the Soviet Union's NKVD units, took place on May 7, 1945, in the village of Kuryłówka, southeastern Poland. The battle ended in a victory for the underground Polish forces.

== Background ==
In May 1945 World War II ended in Europe. But as Norman Davies wrote in No Simple Victory, even after Victory Day the war was not completely over: "In all Soviet-occupied countries the NKVD was hunting down a variety of political opponents and freedom fighters (...) Stalin and Stalinism were still in place - unregenerate, as murderous as ever, and victorious".

On May 7, a major battle between the Polish anti-communist resistance organization, National Military Alliance (Narodowe Zjednoczenie Wojskowe, NZW) and NKVD units took place in the village of Kuryłówka, located near Leżajsk (Subcarpathian Voivodeship). According to several sources, this was the biggest battle in the history of the Polish anti-communist movement, in which reportedly up to 70 NKVD agents died. Polish units were commanded by Major Franciszek Przysiężniak (noms de guerre "Marek", "Ojciec Jan").

== 1944-1945 in the area of Rzeszów ==
Most of the area of today's Subcarpathian Voivodeship was captured by the Red Army in the summer of 1944. The Soviets immediately started to persecute members of the Home Army, loyal to the Polish government-in-exile, and their actions sparked resistance (see: Łukasz Ciepliński, Adam Lazarowicz). On January 19, 1945, General Leopold Okulicki formally disbanded the Home Army, however several members of the organization decided to continue struggle for free Poland, seeing the Soviet forces as new occupiers. New movements were created, such as Wolność i Niezawisłość, Narodowe Siły Zbrojne, NIE or Narodowe Zjednoczenie Wojskowe.

These organizations were oppressed mainly by the NKVD and later by the newly created Polish secret police, Urząd Bezpieczeństwa. In the area of Rzeszów, the most important and the strongest of anti-Communist movements was Wolnosc i Niezawislosc, but other organizations such as Narodowe Zjednoczenie Wojskowe also were present. Rzeszów's district of NZW was run by several people including Kazimierz Mirecki, Józef Salabun, Kazimierz Nizieński, and Piotr Woźniak.

In March 1945, Rzeszów's NZW created the so-called Command of the Forest Units, which oversaw partisan troops in the area. These units were commanded by Major Franciszek Przysiężniak.

== Battle ==
In early May, an NZW unit numbering some 200 soldiers was stationed in the village of Kuryłówka, near the town of Leżajsk. It was commanded by Major Przysiężniak. NKVD troops, stationed in Biłgoraj, found out about the Poles and sent two companies there, which probably were part of the 2nd Border Regiment of the NKVD (establishing Soviet sources on this matter is very difficult).

According to other sources, the NKVD troops came to Kuryłówka searching for a group of deserters from Polish People's Army (Ludowe Wojsko Polskie) who had decided to join the anti-Communist forces.

The battle took place on May 7. The Polish unit numbered some 200 soldiers; the exact number of NKVD troops is unknown, but most probably there were up to 300 of them. The skirmish ended in the NKVD unit's retreat. It is difficult to establish the number of NKVD victims; some sources claim that 56 agents died, some say up to 70. The number of Polish victims is unknown.

== The next day ==
After the battle, the Polish unit, fearing reprisals, left the area of Kuryłówka. The next day, a strong NKVD force appeared in the village. The village of Kuryłówka was burned, more than 200 houses were razed to the ground. The Soviets then shot six persons, and two more died in the blaze. 920 people became homeless.

== Aftermath ==
The Battle of Kuryłówka is commemorated on the Tomb of the Unknown Soldier in Warsaw, with the inscription “KURYŁÓWKA 7 V 1945"

== See also ==
- Cursed soldiers
- Raid on Kielce Prison
