= Henryk Flame =

Polish resistance member

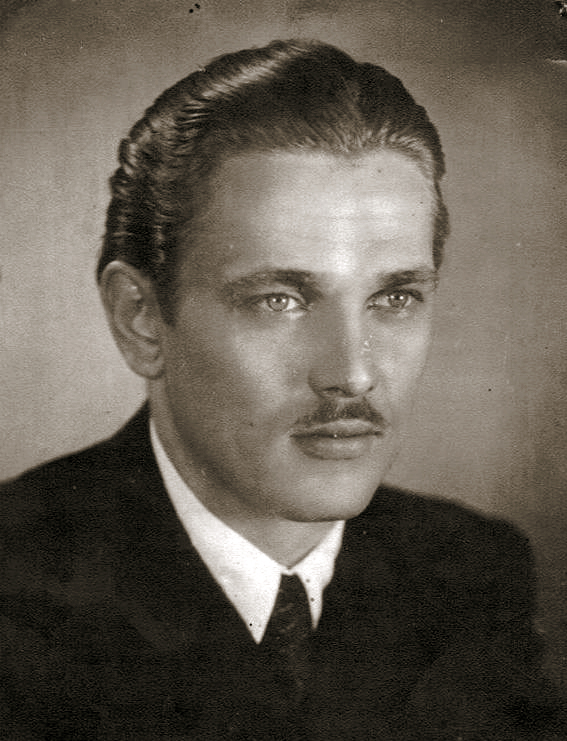
- Born: January 19, 1918; Frysztat, Austria-Hungary
- Died: December 1, 1947 (aged 29); Zabrzeg, Poland
- Military career
- Service years: 1939-1947
- Rank: Captain
- Nickname: Bartek
- Units: Polish Air Force, National Armed Forces
- Conflicts: World War II, Anti-Soviet resistance

Henryk Antoni Flame (or Flamme, nom de guerre "Grot" or "Bartek"; January 19, 1918 – December 1, 1947) was a corporal and pilot in the Polish Air Force, and a captain of the anti-Nazi, and anti-Communist resistance organization NSZ.

== Early life ==
Henryk was the son of Emeryk and Maria (née Raszyk). In 1919 the Flame family moved from Frysztat in Trans-Olza to Czechowice-Dziedzice. He finished the local gimnazjum and the Technical School in Bielsko. In 1936 he volunteered for the army and began studying at the School for Cadets of the Airforce in Bydgoszcz, which he completed in 1939 with the rank of corporal-pilot. He was allotted to the 123rd Fighter Squadron which was stationed in Kraków.

== During World War II ==
During the Nazi invasion of Poland in 1939, as a pilot of the squadron he fought the Luftwaffe at the Siege of Warsaw (1939). On September 1, 1939, the first air battle of World War II took place, during which the plane piloted by Flame was shot down. From then on he was under the direct command of the President of Warsaw, Stefan Starzyński. On the 7th of September the 123rd Squadron was withdrawn from Warsaw to Lublin. On the 17th of the same months most of the soldiers of the squadron crossed the Romanian border in order to avoid capture by the Nazis. However, Flame remained and most likely became part of the newly formed Reconnaissance Squadron operating on the Lwów – Zaleszczyki line.

Sometime after the 17th of September his plane was shot down by the Soviets who had invaded Poland in accordance with the Nazi-Soviet Molotov–Ribbentrop Pact. He organized from various groups of retreating soldiers a convoy, which at the end of September crossed into Hungary.

In Hungary together with other Polish soldiers he was interned and placed in a temporary holding camp from which he soon escaped. However, while hiding with a Hungarian farmer, he was denounced to the German authorities who arrested him and imprisoned him in a POW camp in a part of Austria which had been made part of the Third Reich. In the second half of 1940, thanks to the intervention of his family he was released and came back to his home town of Czechowice.. Back home, Flame began working as a machinist at the local rail year while at the same time establishing contacts with the anti-Nazi resistance.

He started an underground organization called "HAK" which soon was merged into the Home Army (AK). The purpose of the organization was gathering intelligence and sabotage. At the end of 1943, due to the danger of an arrest by the Gestapo, together with his men he escaped to the forests where he organized an independent partisan group, which operated in the Beskid foothills. The command of the National Armed Forces (NSZ) took notice of his actions and he received an invitation to join that organization. He agreed and in October 1944 he was sworn in as a soldier of NSZ and promoted to the rank of captain.

== After the war (in the NSZ) ==
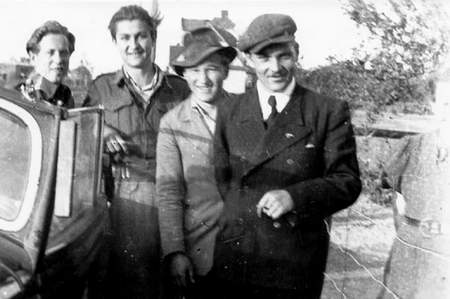
Henryk Flame, first from the right, photographed after the 1947 amnesty

On February 12, 1945, the Red Army entered Czechowice. Flame, acting on the orders of NSZ command, revealed himself to Soviet authorities and together with his men presented himself at their disposal. However, at the same time, the group retained its conspiratorial structure (the ostensible purpose was to infiltrate the Communist authorities and bureaucracy with NSZ men). Despite objections from local communist activist, Flame was made the commandant of the Czechowice milicja (MO). Realizing the orders of NSZ command he put his own men in charge of the police force and hired other anti-communists into the militia. At the same time he began stockpiling weapons knowing that sooner or later a confrontation with the real communists was inevitable.

In April 1945 he was once again threatened with arrest, this time by the communists. As before he escaped to the forests, assumed the nom-de-guerre "Bartek" and created a partisan unit - the NSZ Group of the 7th Region of Silesia and Cieszyn. From May 1945 until February 1947 Flame "Bartek", led the largest anti-communist partisan group in the Trans-Olza region. At its height his unit numbered 300 men, all of whom had military uniforms and were well armed thanks to Flame's previous efforts as commandant of the MO. All together the group carried out around 340 military actions. Among the best known occurred when Flame's men marched in formation through the town of Wisła. This military parade lasted two hours and took place in full sight of the local communist authorities who could not do anything about it. This demonstration of power by the "King of the Beskid foothills", as Flame soon became known, remained a source of embarrassment for the communist authorities even after Flame's death and underlined the lack of support for communists in the Cieszyn region.

== Operation "Lawina" ==
In September 1946 in Operation Lawina, organized by a secret police mole in Flame's unit, the UB convinced him and many of his men that they could be transported to the American zone in Germany. In actuality while waiting to be transported out of Poland, around 200 of his soldiers were first drugged, then stripped and taken into the forests and murdered. "Bartek" himself escaped from the transport when he realized that something was not right. The exact place of the execution site is unknown but the forests near Łambinowice, Hubertus or the village of Barut have been proposed. After this incident the initiative passed to the secret police and Flame found himself hunted and more and more of his men were caught and killed. Individuals implicated in the annihilation of the Flames'-lead NSZ units were: Henryk Wendrowski (UB agent who penetrated its ranks), Roman Romkowski (Natan Grinszpan-Kikiel) who along with Marek Fink (Mark Finkienberg) devised and supervised the conduct of the Operation "Lawina". In 1970, Fink began to use the name Witold Jozwicki. Jan Fryderyk Zielinski, Polish Secret Police functionary stated that the murdered NSZ soldiers were buried in two pits, and further elaborated that "Neither [himself], nor other functionaries knew where [they were] going. When [they] arrived there, it became apparent that [they were] in Lambinowice. At night [they] cordoned off the entire area, and began operation in the morning. Wladyslaw 'Wladzio' Osobowski [who until 1959 was an UB functionary, and later lived in the Soviet Union] finished off the 'Bartek's' unit guard with a knife. Next, through opened windows, somebody threw two grenades into two rooms. After explosions however, most of them [the NSZ soldiers] [were] still alive. They started to run. They were shocked by both the explosions and the alcohol that they drank earlier. The whole area was surrounded, and all of them were captured. After they were detained, they were ordered to take their clothes off, and then naked, they were individually lead to a 3 meter deep pit where they were murdered; everyone with a shot to the back of the head. After the shooting, either a diesel fuel, and/or gasoline was poured on bodies, and clothes, and then it was set on fire".

Because the situation became hopeless Flame decided to give himself up. The opportunity arose with the passage of the 1947 Amnesty on February 22 which promised underground soldiers that they would not be prosecuted (the promise was not kept). Henryk presented himself to the UB in Cieszyn on March 11, 1947. While this was regarded as quite a success for the communist authorities, many of them wanted revenge. However, for the time being because of the amnesty, Flame could not be legally prosecuted. A secret death sentence was supposedly issued by the President of Poland Bolesław Bierut himself, who could not forgive the humiliation associated with a 400 strong NSZ unit staging a military parade in Wisła.

== Death ==
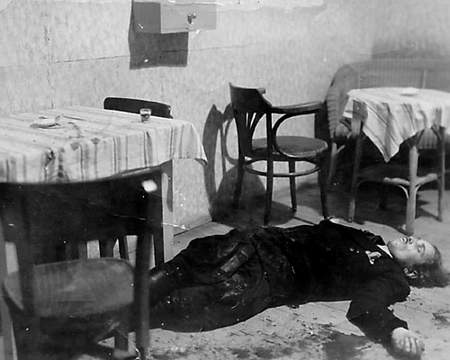
"Bartek"'s corpse after being killed in a restaurant in Zabrzeg

On December 1, 1947, in Zabrzeg Henryk Flame was assassinated by the local communist policeman Rudolf Dadak, in a plot organized by Henryk Wendrowski (who was also responsible for "Action Lawina" in which Bartek's men were killed). Flame was shot while dining in a restaurant. Neither Dadak nor anyone else involved was ever charged with his murder.
