= Ludwik Kalkstein =

Polish Nazi collaborator (1920–1994)

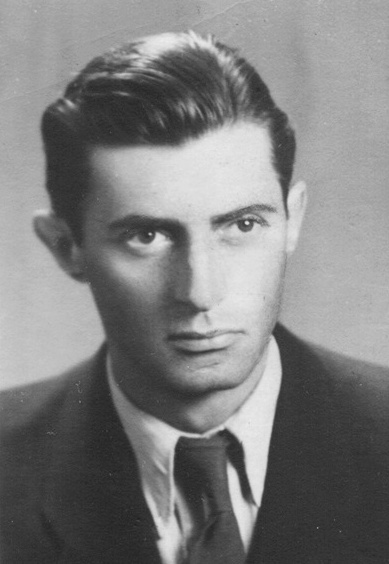
- Ludwik Kalkstein before the war
- Born: 13 March 1920; Warsaw, Second Polish Republic
- Died: 26 October 1994 (aged 74); Munich, Germany
- Resting place: Munich Waldfriedhof
- Known for: Polish collaborator
- Awards: Cross of Valour

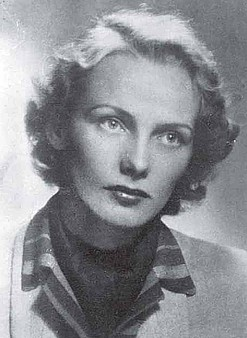
Blanka Kaczorowska before the war

Ludwik "Hanka" Kalkstein (13 March 1920, in Warsaw– 26 October 1994, in Munich) was a Polish Nazi collaborator. He worked as a Nazi police agent during the German occupation of Poland and then as a Stalinist informant after the Soviet takeover of Poland. Along with his wife (Blanka Kaczorowska "Sroka", b. 13 October 1922 in Brest, d. 25 August 2004), they became traitors to the Polish AK resistance organization. Kalkstein was responsible for the arrest and execution by the Nazis of at least 14 officers of the Polish underground, including General Stefan Rowecki.

== Biography ==
Kalkstein was born on 13 March 1920 in Warsaw as the son of Edward Kalkstein and Ludwika née Kucińska, owners of a textile shop. He claimed to be a descendant of Colonel Krystian Kalkstein, who lived in the 17th century, but there is no confirmation of this in documents, according to genealogy he was a descendant of the Kalksteins from the Brodnica region, the first Kalkstein to settle in the Brodnica area was Jan Kalkstein, to whom Ludwig von Erlichshausen granted 11 łans of land under Magdeburg law in Świecie near Brodnica in 1450, a branch of the Kalksteins originating from Polaszki also lived in the Brodnica area.

In 1939, Ludwik Kalkstein graduated from high school, in September he left for Vilnius, where he probably worked in the underground. In January 1940 he returned to Warsaw, where he joined the offensive intelligence of the ZWZ-AK. He operated in the Stragan intelligence network.

In the spring of 1941, he organized his own Hanka group (the so-called "H" network), developing his own network of informants. After a year of intelligence activity, he was promoted to the rank of second lieutenant and awarded the Cross of Valor for stealing a German situational plan of landing sites in occupied Europe and a recipe for a new aluminum alloy. Arrested by the Gestapo in April 1942 and interrogated, Kalkstein and Kaczorowska had followed a path taken by other Nazi agents. After collaborating with the Germans and even fighting on their side against the Poles during the Warsaw Uprising of 1944 (Kalkstein joined the SS as "Paul Henchel"), they would later collaborate as informants with the Communist UB after their internment in prison.

Kalkstein was arrested by the Ministry of Public Security in August 1953 and sentenced to life imprisonment, charged with having betrayed General Rowecki. The sentence was reduced to 12 years in prison. He was released in 1965 under an amnesty. In 1973 he settled in Piaseczno, Poland, where he ran a chicken farm, then moved to the village of Utrata near Jarocin, where he owned a large pig farm. In 1981 or 1982 he travelled to France, where his son (from a relationship with Blanka Kaczorowski) lived. The family claimed that he died in France in the 1980s. In fact, in the mid-1980s he emerged in Munich, Germany, where he worked in the library of the Polish Catholic Mission under the name "Edward Ciesielski". He died in Munich on 26 October 1994.

== See also ==
- Helena Wolinska-Brus, military prosecutor in Stalinist Poland
- Edward Wasilewski, informant of the Ministry of Public Security until 1960
