= Franciszek Jerzy Jaskulski =

Polish resistance fighter (1913–1947)

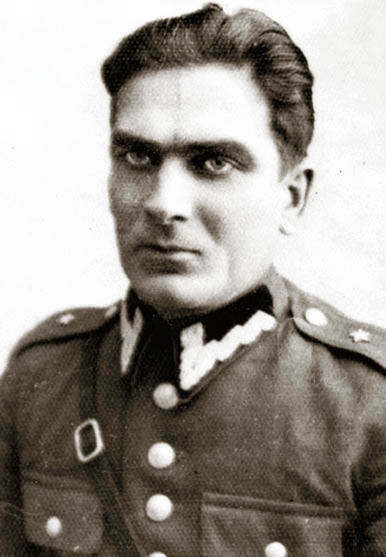
- Born: 16 September 1913; Castrop
- Died: 19 February 1947 (aged 33); Kielce, Polish People's Republic
- Military career
- Allegiance: Poland
- Branch: Polish Army; Home Army; Freedom and Independence
- Rank: Porucznik (First lieutenant)
- Nicknames: Zagończyk, Zagon
- Conflicts: Second World War; Anti-communist resistance in Poland (1944–1953)
- Awards

Major Franciszek Jerzy Jaskulski (16 September 1913 – 19 February 1947), aka 'Zagończyk', was a soldier in the Polish Home Army and a commander in Freedom and Independence (a Polish underground anticommunist organization) in the Radom region of Poland. In 2007 the Polish president Lech Kaczyński posthumously awarded Jaskulski the order of Polonia Restituta.

== Early life ==
Jaskulski was born in Castrop - Rauxel in Germany, to a family of Polish emigrants. When he was 7 he returned with his parents to Poland. They lived in Zduny in Greater Poland. After finishing his studies in Krotoszyn he started working at the Borough Office in Zduny. During this time he also studied law. In 1937 he graduated from the Cavalry NCOs School in Grudziądz. In 1939 he volunteered for the Polish Army. During the German Invasion of Poland he served with distinction in the 68 Regiment of Infantry. He fought during the siege of Warsaw. He was taken captive by the Germans but successfully escaped in October 1939. He returned to Zduny, where from 1940 to 1942 he worked at the railway station. At the same time he organized an underground anti-Nazi unit and edited an illegal newspaper, entitled Zagończyk ("Raider").

In December 1939 he joined the Union of Armed Struggle (ZWZ), an underground army formed in Poland during the Nazis and Soviet occupation, which was renamed to the Home Army (Armia Krajowa) in 1942.

In 1943 after deconspiracy of many units of Home Army in the Radom region by the Gestapo, he escaped to Lublin where he was the commander of Home Army units in near Garwolin. At this time he was promoted and transferred to Puławy. There he had to fight not only with Germans but also with Soviet partisans. In 1944 he was promoted to lieutenant and became the commander of unit called "Pilot".

== Imprisonment ==
Like many other Polish officers and soldiers of the Home Army, Zagończyk was arrested by the NKVD. He was captured on 3 November 1944 and taken to the prison at Lublin Castle. On 8 January 1945 he was sentenced to death for his affiliation with the Home Army. Two weeks later the death penalty was annulled and his sentence was commuted to 10 years of imprisonment. In September 1945 he escaped from the prison in Wronki by taking advantage of the fact that he was working outside of prison grounds.

== Fight with communists ==
After his escape Zagończyk returned to Pulawy. At those times underground army was scattered and divided into many small units, fighting on their own, without one strong aim. Many young people were escaping to forests and becoming guerillas in order to avoid being arrested or killed by NKVD and Red Army. After a few weeks Zagonczyk got an order to move to Kozienice region and take command of units in this region. On 22 October 1945 he took part in unsuccessful try of liberation Home Army's soldiers from communist prison in Dęblin. In the beginning Zagonczyk was commanding of the units in Pulawy region but soon he became the commander of units in the whole Radom region. He was also the commander of organization called Związek Zbrojnej Konspiracji. The main aim of this organization was to fight with Soviets, inform people about real situation of the country. They were issuing many leaflets informing soldiers and people living at the Radom region about situation in Poland and at Europe. This action was to help to win the referendum in 1946. All attempts were useless because the communists had falsified the results of referendum. But Zagonczyk and his soldiers was still fighting with communists and units of Citizen's Militia.

== Treason, death and rehabilitation ==
On 24 July 1946 Zagonczyk liberated prisoners from railway transport near Jedlnia-Letnisko. There was suspicion that the action was inspired by communists in order to arrest Zagonczyk. On 26 July 1946 Zagonczyk was arrested. Communists tried to force him to give names of people who were involved in fight with them but Zagonczyk refused. On 11 January 1947 he was sentenced to death. He was executed in secrecy and the location of his grave remains unknown. He was married with three children.

After his death underground army was still fighting. Till 1950, was fighting unit of Alexander Młyński "Drągal" and Tadeusz Zieliński "Igła". After Zagonczyk's death, communist propaganda accused him of all sorts of crimes, from crimes against humanity, robbery and common theft to membership in UPA. After the fall of the communism, in 1991, Jaskulski was rehabilitated and declared innocent of the charges of which he had been accused.

For his underground activity, Jaskulski was awarded the Knight's Cross of the Order of Virtuti Militari and the Cross of Valour. In 2009 he was posthumously awarded him the Officer's Cross of the Order of Polonia Restituta by Polish President Lech Kaczyński.

== Awards and decorations ==
- Silver Cross of Virtuti Militari
- Commander's Cross with Star of the Order of Polonia Restituta (1 March 2019)
- Officer's Cross of Order of Polonia Restituta (posthumously, 2009)
- Cross of Valour
