= Adam Boryczka =

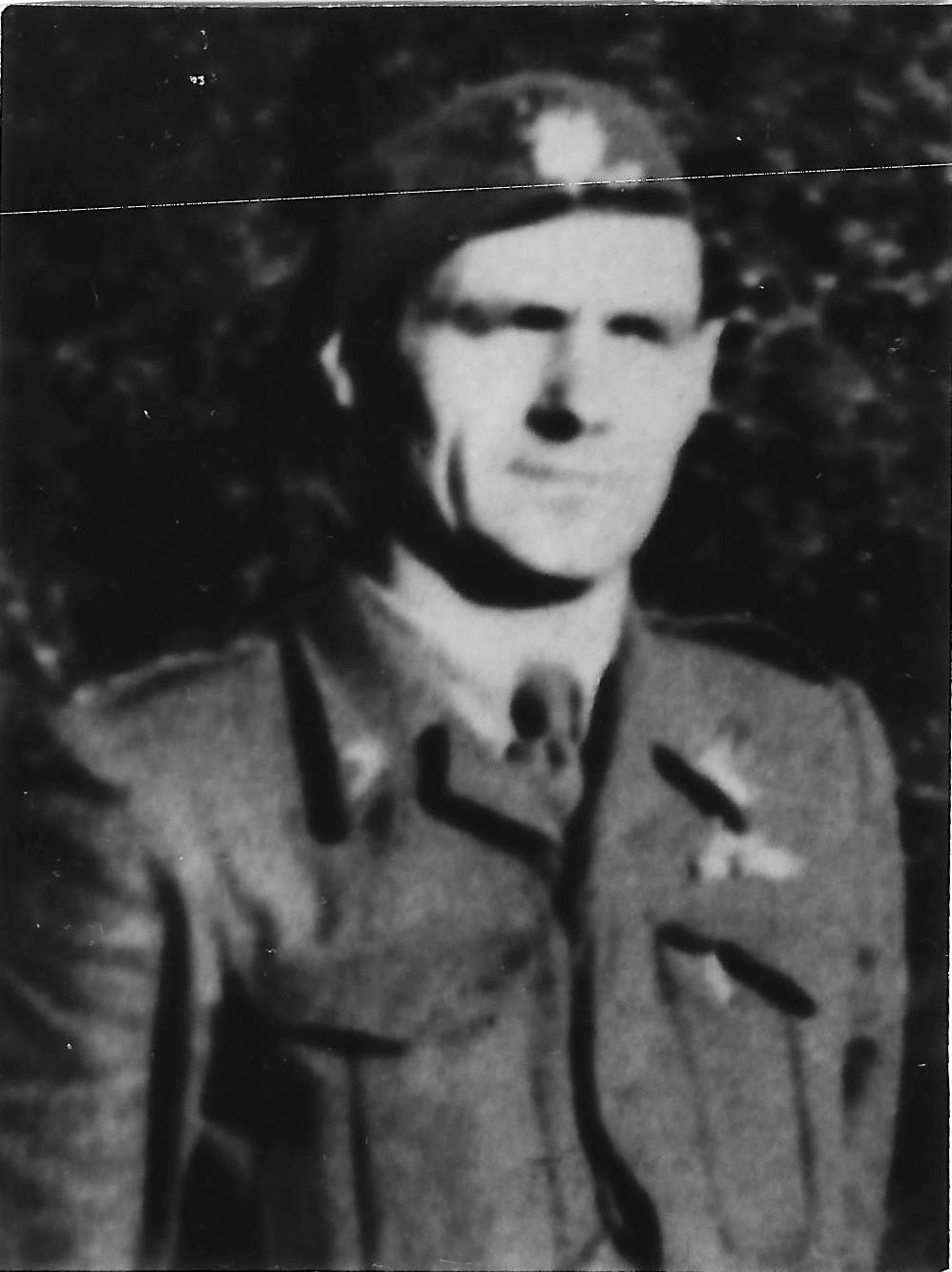
- Born: 1913
- Died: 1988 (aged 74–75)
- Military career
- Allegiance: Poland
- Branch: Army
- Rank: Captain

Adam Boryczka (1913–1988) was a Captain of the Polish Army and member of the underground Home Army in the area of Wilno, where he fought the Germans and after 1944 - the Soviets. Some time in 1945 he moved to central Poland and began working for the anti-Communist organization Wolnosc i Niezawislosc (WiN). In June 1954, he tried to escape Poland, was caught, was sentenced to death, which was changed to life in prison. Released in 1967, he later wrote a book "Z dziejow WiN", which describes the history of the organization.

== Sources ==
- http://powstanie-warszawskie-1944.ac.pl/zw_nzw.htm
