= Citizens' Home Army =

The Citizens' Home Army (Polish: Armia Krajowa Obywatelska, AKO) was a Polish military anticommunist organization, and a successor of the disbanded Polish anti-Nazi resistance Home Army (Armia Krajowa, AK). It was founded in February 1945 by Colonel Władysław Liniarski (nom de guerre "Mścisław"), who had previously been commandant of the Białystok District of the Home Army.

AK in the Białystok area was a powerful force. In early 1945 it had almost 30,000 soldiers, together with units that remained east of the Curzon Line, around Grodno and Wolkowysk. The number of soldiers grew steadily in the first half of 1945, as numerous AK brigades from Districts of Wilno and Navahrudak were coming to Białystok to continue fighting the Communists.

AKO was concentrated on military action, between February and September 1945 it fought several battles and skirmishes with Red Army (62nd I.D.) and NKVD troops as well as Polish Urząd Bezpieczeństwa units. In early summer of 1945 the Soviets and Polish Communists de facto controlled only the city of Białystok and a few major towns, like Grajewo or Ostrołęka, the rest of the Białystok Voivodeship (1919-1939) remained in the hands of AKO. Soldiers of AKO liquidated hundreds of Soviet agents - only in May 1945 they killed some 200 of them. They also attacked almost all towns in the area, apart from Białystok.

Armia Krajowa Obywatelska disbanded in late summer of 1945. The remaining structure was incorporated into Wolnosc i Niezawislosc.

== See also ==
- Cursed soldiers
- 1951 Mokotów Prison execution

== Sources ==
- http://powstanie-warszawskie-1944.ac.pl/zw_ako.htm
- https://web.archive.org/web/20071201104317/http://wilk.wpk.p.lodz.pl/~whatfor/zw_ako.htm
- https://web.archive.org/web/20111002153739/http://www.przeciek.pl/info-616.htm
