= Anti-communist resistance in Poland (1944–1953) =

Resistance against the communist government in Poland

- Part of anti-communist resistance in Poland (1944–1989) and anti-communist insurgencies in Central and Eastern Europe
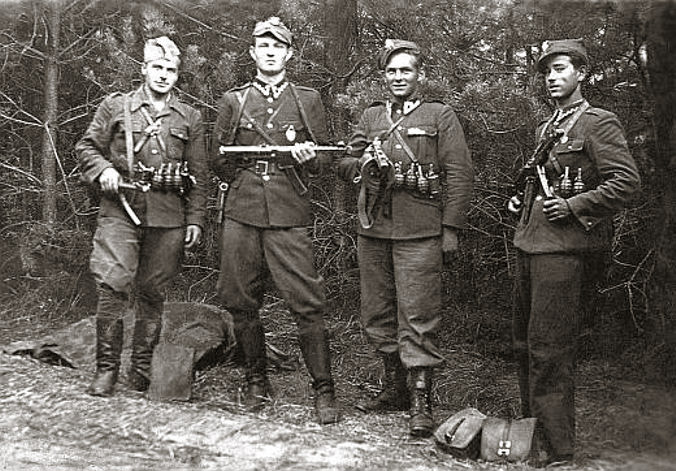
- "Cursed soldiers" of the anti-communist Polish underground (1947). Photograph from the Solidarność Walcząca archives.
Date	1944–1953 (last partisan Józef Franczak was killed in 1963)
Location	Polish People's Republic, Territories of Poland annexed by the Soviet Union
Result	Government victory: Insurgency suppressed; Peace Restored; Continuance of non-violent resistance

Belligerents
Cursed soldiers Polish government-in-exile Ukrainian Insurgent Army (1945–1946)	Poland; Soviet Union

Commanders and leaders
Łukasz Ciepliński (executed); Witold Pilecki (executed); Zygmunt Szendzielarz (executed); Romuald Rajs (executed); Józef Kuraś †; ...and others	Bolesław Bierut; Stanisław Radkiewicz; K. Rokossovsky; Vladislav Korchits; Lavrentiy Beria; Ivan Serov

Units involved
Freedom and Independence; NIE; Citizens' Home Army; Peasants' Battalions; National Armed Forces...and others	Red Army; NKVD; SMERSH; Polish People's Army; Internal Security Corps; ORMO; Citizens' Militia; Department of Security

Strength
20,000 partisans 150,000-180,000 total	2,000,000 Red Army soldiers; 35,000 NKVD officers; 24,000 Polish soldiers and Ministry of Public Security officers

Casualties and losses
8,668 killed in fighting; 79,000 arrested; 5,000 executed; 21,000 died in prison	12,000 officers of Polish forces; 1,000 officers of Soviet forces; 10,000 civilians killed (via crimes, terror and attacks
- 10,000

The anti-communist resistance in Poland, also referred to as the Polish anti-communist insurrection fought between 1944 and 1953, was an anti-communist and anti-Soviet armed struggle by the Polish Underground against the Soviet domination of Poland by the Soviet-installed People's Republic of Poland, since the end of World War II in Europe. The guerrilla warfare conducted by the resistance movement formed during the war, included an array of military attacks launched against communist prisons, state security offices, detention facilities for political prisoners, and prison camps set up across the country by the Stalinist authorities.

In January 1945, the pro-Soviet government installed in Poland by the advancing Red Army declared as "illegal" parts of the Polish resistance such as militia/paramilitary units of the Home Army, and ordered its surviving members to come out into the open while guaranteeing them freedom and safety. Many underground fighters decided to lay down their arms and register, but after doing so, some of them were arrested and thrown in prison due to their pasts, which were overlooked during wartime. Thousands of them were tortured and later deported into the Soviet Gulag camp system after being tried, with many deaths (see, the Uroczysko Baran killing fields among similar others).

As a result, many remaining Armia Krajowa (AK) members quickly stopped trusting the new government, and some of them regrouped clandestinely to oppose the new Soviet backed government. They formed various post-AK resistance organisations, such as Wolność i Niezawisłość ("Freedom and Sovereignty"), and liberated hundreds of prisoners. They became known as the "cursed soldiers" of the Polish underground, and most were eventually captured and tried for their crimes or killed by the security services and special assassination squads.

== Soviet westward offensive across occupied Poland ==
On the night of 3–4 January 1944 the advancing Red Army crossed the former eastern border of the Second Polish Republic in the area of Volhynia (near the village of Rokitno). In several months, they pushed the Wehrmacht further west, reaching the line of the Vistula river on 24 July 1944. The Soviet advance stopped short of Warsaw, while the Armia Krajowa attempted to liberate the Polish capital from the Nazis ahead of the Red Army's offensive. The Warsaw Uprising by forces loyal to the Polish government-in-exile in London was crushed after 63 days.

On 22 July 1944, acting upon orders from Moscow, the Polish communists who arrived in the eastern town of Chełm created a pro-Soviet Committee, which became the Provisional Government of the Republic of Poland after re-locating to Lublin.

After moving to Warsaw in January 1945, and with full political control by Stalin and Soviet sponsorship, the communists abandoned the parliamentary system of prewar Poland and ignored the wishes of the Polish people, basing their new government's power solely on the Red Army's occupation of the country.

Meanwhile, acting together under the command of Soviet General Ivan Serov, the forces of the NKVD, SMERSH and the Polish communist secret service (UB), which was modelled on the Soviet secret police, began countrywide operations against the members of the Armia Krajowa and other Polish resistance units loyal to the government-in-exile. Approximately 25,000 underground soldiers, including 300 Home Army officers, were arrested, disarmed, and interned before October 1944. On 15 October 1944, Lavrentiy Beria signed Order No. 0012266/44, which established NKVD Division 64, whose only task was to fight against the Polish resistance. Tens of thousands of Polish partisans were deported to Siberia. Many members of the Polish underground were given the choice between a lengthy prison sentence, and service in the Soviet-run Polish Armed Forces in the East. Faced with an unacceptable choice, and knowing about the grave fate of their own leaders (see: Trial of the Sixteen), thousands of soldiers of the Home Army (which was officially disbanded on 19 January 1945) and other organizations decided to continue fighting for freedom after the end of World War II.

== Polish anti-communist Insurrection ==
The situation in Poland in the immediate aftermath of World War II has been described as an all-out civil war, or near civil war by many historians, as members of the independence movement carried out numerous attacks on both Soviet and Polish communist offices and institutions. In return, the Stalinist authorities carried out brutal pacifications of partisans and civilians, mass arrests (see: Augustów chase 1945), deportations, as well as executions (see: Mokotów Prison murder, Public execution in Dębica) and many secret assassinations.

The anti-communist movement responded with attacks on NKVD and UB camps, such as the Attack on the NKVD Camp in Rembertów. The underground units often engaged in regular battles with the Soviets and Polish communist forces (see: Battle of Kuryłówka). Resistance units loyal to the Polish government-in-exile did not hesitate to attack even large cities, to free their fellow soldiers kept in various prisons and detention camps across Poland.

=== List of attacks on communist prisons, camps and state security offices ===
In 2007, the Institute of National Remembrance Commission for the Prosecution of Crimes against the Polish Nation (IPN), published the Atlas of the Independence Underground in Poland 1944–1956, listing scores of armed attacks on communist prisons after World War II, in which hundreds of political prisoners were freed. The most daring assaults were conducted before October 1946.

For a chronological list of anti-Communist operations, please use table-sort buttons.

City or town	Month	Year	Resistance operation with number of prisoners liberated
Biala Krakowska	May 12	1945	A failed attack on a local prison.
Biała Podlaska	November 28	1944	2 political prisoners freed during an attack.
Biała Podlaska	March 9	1945	103 political prisoners liberated after an attack.
Biała Podlaska	May 21	1945	5 political prisoners were freed after an attack.
Białystok	May 9	1945	100 (or so) members of Home Army, National Armed Forces and National Military Organization escaped after the local prison was taken over by them.
Biłgoraj	February 28	1945	40 political prisoners liberated after an DSZ unit captured the whole town.
Biłgoraj	May 27	1945	A failed attempt by DSZ unit at destroying an SB prison.
Bludek village in southern Lublin Voivodeship		1945?	An attack on a local camp for political prisoners, by DSZ unit from Tomaszów Lubelski; the camp was captured and burned down, and the NKVD commandant of the camp executed.
Brzesko	May	1945	A failed attack on a local prison.
Brzeziny	September 6	1945	A failed attack on a local prison.
Brzeziny	May 15	1946	A failed attack on a local prison.
Brzozów	December 13	1944	11 political prisoners freed after a local prison was captured by a Home Army unit.
Dąbrowa Tarnowska	May 8–9	1945	80 (or so) political prisoners were freed after an independence unit took control of the town and the prison.
Grajewo	May 8–9 (night of)	1945	100 (or so) political prisoners were liberated after several independence resistance units seized the whole town, killing 2 NKVD agents and 2 UB agents.
Grojec	November 21	1945	A failed attack on a prison, in which 2 UB agents were killed.
Hrubieszów	December 19	1944	12 Home Army soldiers kept in a local prison were freed by their own unit.
Hrubieszów	May 27–28	1945	Acting together, DSZ and Ukrainian UPA units captured the whole town, burning down local prison and killing 5 NKVD agents.
Janów Lubelski	April 27	1945	15 political prisoners liberated after an DSZ unit seized the town.
Jaworzno	October	1945	A failed attack on the Central Labour Camp Jaworzno.
Kępno	November 22–23	1945	A local prison was captured, 5 UB agents and a Red Army soldier killed.
Kielce	August 4–5	1945	354 political prisoners liberated; 3 UB agents and a soldier of the Red Army killed after the unit under Antoni Heda took control of the city.
Koźmin	September 1	1945	A local prison was destroyed.
Koźmin	October 10–11	1945	A failed attack on a local prison.
Kozienice	May 5–6	1945	8 political prisoners freed, and a Red Army soldier killed after an independence underground unit took control of the town.
Kraków	August 18	1946	64 political prisoners freed after a local prison was captured.
Krasnystaw	November 22	1944	5 Home Army soldiers kept in a local prison, liberated by their fellow companions.
Krotoszyn	August 24	1945	A failed attack on a local prison.
Limanowa	April 17	1945	13 political prisoners were freed after a local prison was captured.
Łomża	May 21	1945	A local prison was destroyed, 2 UB agents were killed.
Łowicz	March 8	1945	73 political prisoners were freed after a local prison was captured by the former Home Army unit.
Łuków	January 24	1946	27 political prisoners liberated after a Freedom and Independence unit captured the town and the prison; 3 UB agents killed.
Maków Mazowiecki	May 1	1945	42 political prisoners freed and 8 UB agents killed after an attack on a local prison.
Miechów	April 25–2	1945	A local prison was destroyed.
Mława	June 3	1945	An attack on a local prison in which unknown number of political prisoners was freed and 3 UB agents killed.
Nowy Sącz	April	1946	A failed attack on a local prison.
Nowy Targ	April 17–18	1945	A local prison destroyed by the unit under Józef Kuraś, 4 UB agents killed.
Ostrów Wielkopolski	September 2	1945	A failed attack on a local prison.
Pabianice	June 10	1945	10 political prisoners were freed after a local prison was captured.
Pińczów	June 3–4	1945	A failed attack on a local prison, 1 UB agent killed.
Piotrków Trybunalski	June 17	1945	An attack on a detention camp for the Home Army soldiers; the camp was captured and destroyed and 5 UB agents killed.
Przemyśl	May 14–15	1945	58 persons escaped after the arrested soldiers of the Home Army took control of the prison.
Przeworsk	May 15	1945	A failed attack on a local prison.
Puławy	April 24	1945	117 political prisoners were freed, and 7 UB agents killed.
Rabka	December 11	1945	A local prison was captured, 1 UB agent killed.
Radom	September 9	1945	300 (or so) political prisoners were liberated, 2 Red Army soldiers and one UB agent killed.
Radomsko	April 19–20	1946	5 political prisoners were freed after the town was captured and a local prison destroyed.
Radzyń	Dec. 31 – Jan. 1	1945–46	A failed attack on the prison, carried out by the Freedom and Independence unit.
Rembertów	May 20–21	1945	800–1400 men were liberated after an attack on NKVD prison camp (for more information, see: Attack on the NKVD Camp in Rembertów).
Rozwadów	February 3	1946	A failed attack on a local prison.
Rzeszów	October 7–8	1944	A failed attack on a prison located in Rzeszów Castle made by a Home Army unit under Colonel Łukasz Ciepliński. Home Army lost 2 men, Red Army also 2, Milicja Obywatelska – 2 as well.
Sandomierz	March 10	1945	100 (or so) political prisoners broke free from the local prison.
Sokołów Podlaski	October	1944	A failed Home Army attack on a local prison.
Szamotuły	June 7–8	1945	2 political prisoners were freed after a local prison was captured.
Szczyrk	July 19	1945	A failed attempt to capture a local prison.
Tarnobrzeg	November 2	1944	15 Home Army soldiers freed from local prison by a Home Army unit.
Tarnów	July 1	1945	35 political prisoners were liberated after a local prison was captured.
Węgrów	May 17–18	1945	2 political prisoners freed after an attack on a local prison.
Włodawa	October 22	1946	100 (or so) political prisoners were freed after a local prison was captured.
Włoszczowa	April 22	1945	A failed attack on a local prison.
Wyrzysk	May 24	1946	43 political prisoners were liberated, and 1 UB security agent killed after a local prison was captured.
Zakopane	February 1	1946	A failed attack on a local prison.
Zakopane	October 13	1946	A failed attack on a local prison.
Zamość	July 22	1944	18 Home Army soldiers kept in a local prison were freed by their fellow companions.
Zamość	October 7	1944	34 Home Army soldiers kept in a local prison were freed by their own unit.
Zamość	May 8	1946	301 political prisoners were freed after an attack carried out by the Freedom and Independence unit.
City or town	Month	Year	Resistance operation with number of prisoners liberated

As per Atlas of the Independence Underground in Poland 1944–1956 by the Institute of National Remembrance, 2007

== Polish National Day of Remembrance of the "cursed soldiers" ==
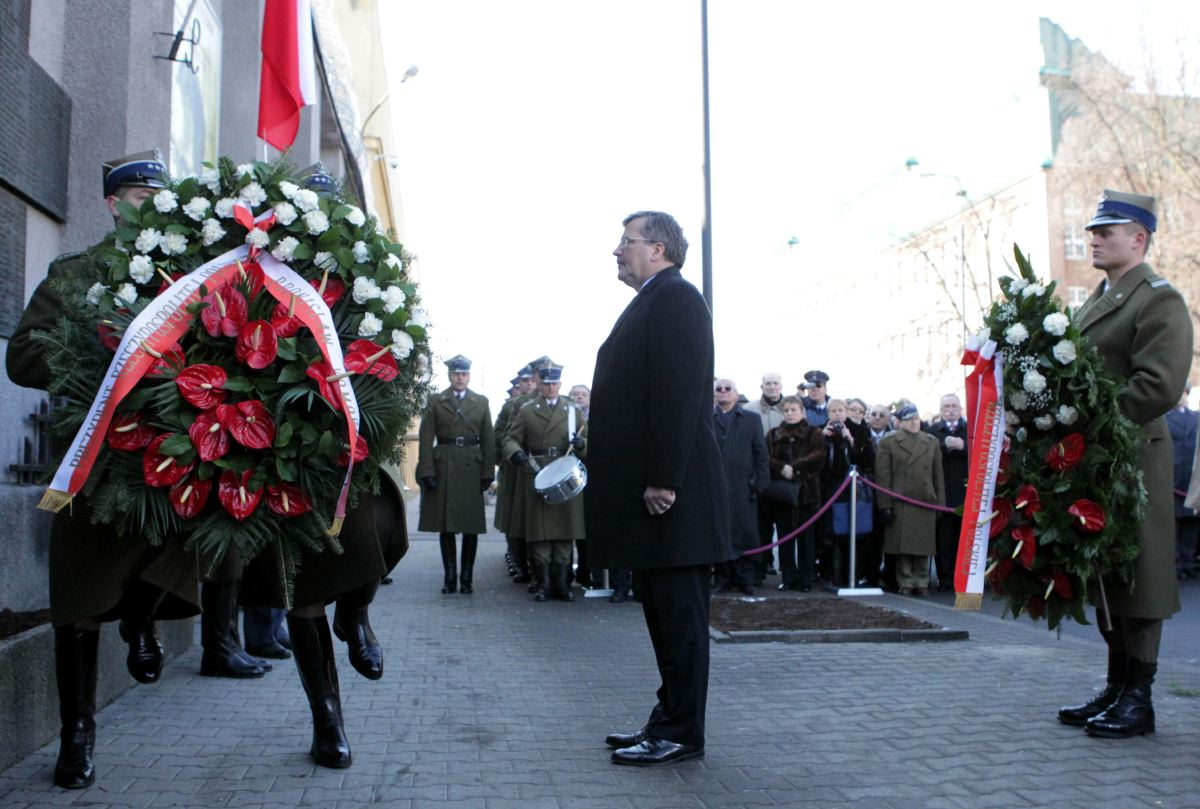
National Day of Remembrance of the "cursed soldiers" commemorations in 2011

In 2001 the Polish Parliament (Sejm) passed a resolution recognizing the merits of underground organizations and groups fighting for Poland's sovereignty after World War II. The resolution acknowledged their unequal struggle against the Soviet takeover of Poland and paid tribute to the fallen and murdered soldiers and the imprisoned members of all organizations that were persecuted by the postwar communist authorities. This was the first official recognition of such magnitude intended to honour the fighters of the armed anti-communist underground. The bill was signed into law by President Bronisław Komorowski on 9 February 2011 and published in the Poland's Dziennik Ustaw Nr 32 / 160 on 15 February 2011. The National Day of Remembrance of the "cursed soldiers" is now commemorated every year in Poland on 1 March.

The original request to establish the Day of Remembrance was submitted in 2009 by Polish war veterans' organizations, including the World Union of Home Army Soldiers (Światowy Związek Żołnierzy Armii Krajowej) and the Association of Soldiers of the National Armed Forces (Związek Żołnierzy Narodowych Sił Zbrojnych). The initiative was backed by local authorities and parliamentary groupings including Poland's two main political parties, Civic Platform and Law and Justice. The legislative initiative for the enactment of the new national holiday was taken in 2010 by the late President Lech Kaczyński.

== In popular culture ==
The novel Ashes and Diamonds by Jerzy Andrzejewski and Andrzej Wajda's dramatization of the book, are devoted to the bloody events in Poland in the immediate aftermath of the Second World War, depicting an operation by anti-communist resistance fighters to assassinate a commissar.

== See also ==
- Anti-communist resistance in Poland (1944–1989)
- Eastern European anti-Communist insurgencies

== Notes and references ==
- The Atlas of the Independence Underground in Poland 1944–1956, Instytut Pamieci Narodowej, Warszawa-Lublin, 2007. ISBN 978-83-60464-45-8
- WiN | Freedom and Independence - A Historical Brief by Dr. Janusz Marek Kurtyka, Ph.D., Instytut Pamięci Narodowej, IPN, Poland.
- (in English) Doomed Soldiers 1944-1963: The Untold Story
- (in Polish) ŻOŁNIERZE WYKLĘCI, Zapomniani Bohaterowie
