= Amnesty of 1947 =

1947 Polish amnesty of the anti-communist underground

The Amnesty of 1947 in Poland was an amnesty directed at soldiers and activists of the Polish anti-communist underground, issued by the authorities of People's Republic of Poland. The law on amnesty was passed by the Polish Sejm on 22 February 1947. The actual purpose of the amnesty was the liquidation of coordinated resistance to the newly-established communist regime. The promise of amnesty was not kept. Information collected during questioning of the "cursed soldiers" who had revealed themselves led to a later round of arrests and repression, including of those who stayed in hiding.

It was the second amnesty in Poland after World War II; the first had lasted from 22 July to 15 October 1945.

== Amnesty ==
The amnesty was in effect for two months, from 25 February until 25 April 1947. There was no provision for its extension. The execution of the amnesty law was placed in the hands of the Ministry of Public Security (UB). The amnesty did not apply to the members of the Ukrainian nationalist organizations, such as the Ukrainian Insurgent Army, as were considered allies of Nazi Germany by the communist government. Throughout Poland, special "National Amnesty Committees" were formed, attached to the local stations of the Polish political police, UB. Each person who gave himself up as part of the amnesty had to give up his weapons, if he had any, fill out a detailed form in which he revealed the underground resistance group he was a member of, as well as his conspiratorial code name and other information.

During the amnesty, 53,000 to 55,000 people came out of the underground and presented themselves to the authorities. A further 23,257 persons who had already been imprisoned declared themselves members of underground organizations in order to take advantage of the law. All together the amnesty ended up covering 76,774 people. For the most part, they were soldiers from various underground organizations, such as Freedom and Independence (WiN) and National Armed Forces (NSZ), as well as deserters from the Polish People's Army, the milicja (MO) and the UB. According to official statistics of the Ministry of Public Security, 90% of all members of the organization Freedom and Independence revealed themselves, and about 60% of all members of the National Armed Forces. For comparison, in the previous amnesty of 1945, only 30,217 persons left the underground resistance many of whom soon returned to actively fighting the communist government.

== Consequences ==
As a result, after the expiration of the deadline in 1947, there remained no more than 2000 soldiers in the armed anti-communist underground. A well-organized resistance practically ceased to exist. Thanks to the information obtained from those who gave themselves up, the UB quickly hunted down and eliminated those who remained in the underground.

Almost as soon as the amnesty had expired, the communist authorities began to go back on their promises. All of the information was analyzed and many of the former soldiers were called back to give more information about their friends and fellow soldiers who remained in the underground. Many of them were consequently arrested on trumped-up charges. Between 1948 and 1950 more were arrested on charges which were supposed to have been covered by the amnesty. A number of those who had given themselves up, as a result, returned to the underground although most had ceased participation in armed resistance.
