= Janusz Bokszczanin =

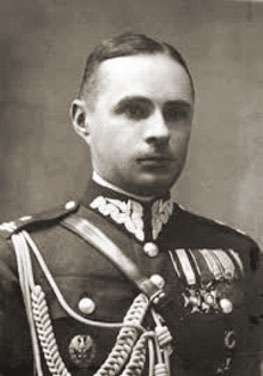
Janusz Bokszczanin

Janusz Bokszczanin (1894, Grodno – 1973) was a colonel of the Polish Army and one of the first Polish commanders of the motorized troops in the reborn Second Polish Republic. During World War II he joined the ZWZ resistance organization and later the Home Army (Armia Krajowa). Until 1943 he served as chief of department of rapid response within its headquarters. In 1944, prior to the anti-Fascist Operation Tempest, he became the chief of operations, and deputy chief of staff of the entire Home Army (AK).

== Military career ==
Before Poland's return to independence, Bokszczanin served in the Russian imperial army prior to the outbreak of World War I in 1914. Due to Bolshevik revolution in 1917 he was allowed to join the Polish 3rd Corps being formed in Russia. The Corps reached Poland in 1918. He joined Polish Army the following year. After receiving extensive military training, in 1935 Bokszczanin became the chief of staff of the Wołyńska Cavalry Brigade. After that he became the commanding officer of Polish 10th Mounted Rifle Regiment. He led the Regiment during its reorganization from standard horse-mounted cavalry into motorized infantry. During the Polish Defensive War of 1939 he led his unit in the ranks of Col. Stanisław Maczek's 10th Motorized Cavalry Brigade (Poland), however he did not cross the border with Hungary and avoided being captured by the Germans and Soviets.

=== Resistance ===
As one of the most experienced Polish specialists in war of manoeuvre, in 1940 he joined the ZWZ resistance organization, later to be reformed into the Home Army. Until 1943 he served as the leader of department of rapid response within the headquarters of that organization. In 1944, prior to Operation Tempest, he became the chief of operations and deputy chief of staff of the entire Home Army (AK). After the failure of the Warsaw Uprising, he became the last chief of staff of AK (October 1944 - January 1945). After the Soviet takeover of Poland the Polish underground army was disbanded and Bokszczanin joined the Polish Government Delegate's Office at Home and became the deputy delegate of the Polish government in exile. He then joined the Wolność i Niezawisłość organization created to disarm the former Armia Krajowa units and help them find their place in communist-ruled post-war Poland. He served briefly as the deputy managing director of that organization, after which in October 1945 he left the country as an emissary.
