= Konspiracyjne Wojsko Polskie =

Polish paramilitary organization

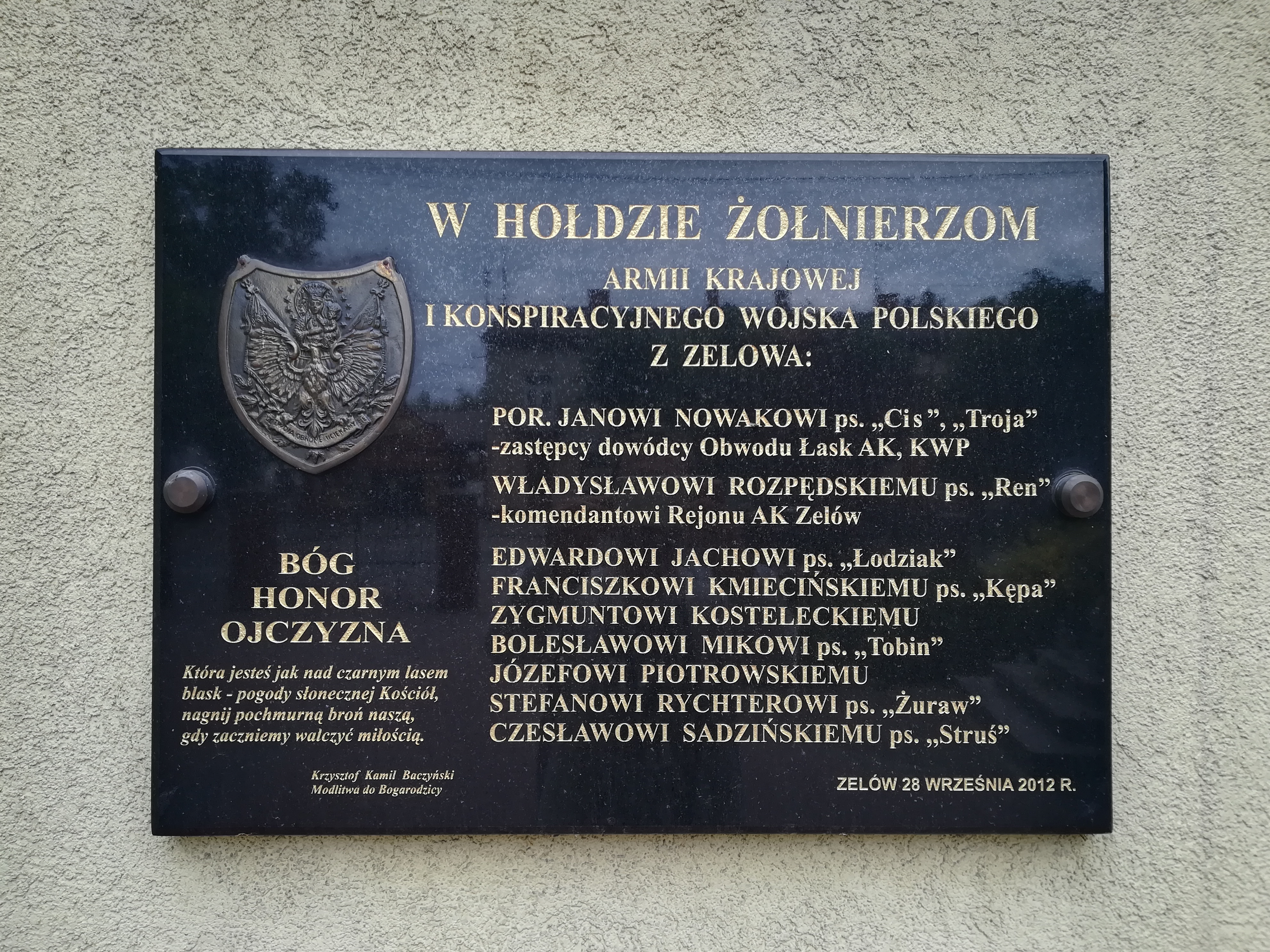
Memorial plaque to members of the Konspiracyjne Wojsko Polskie in Zelów

Konspiracyjne Wojsko Polskie (Underground Polish Army, KWP) was a Polish paramilitary organization, which existed from April 1945 to as late as 1954, whose purpose was to fight the Communist-controlled government of Poland as well as the NKVD. It was most active in the Łódź Voivodeship, but also in the neighboring provinces of northern Upper Silesia, eastern Greater Poland and western Kielce Voivodeship.

KWP's creator and leader (since June 1946) was Captain Stanisław Sojczyński (nom de guerre "Warszyc"). Under his leadership, the organization promoted self-defense from Red Army units and liquidation of the most zealous servants of the regime, but also KWP was engaged in requisitions of necessary means.

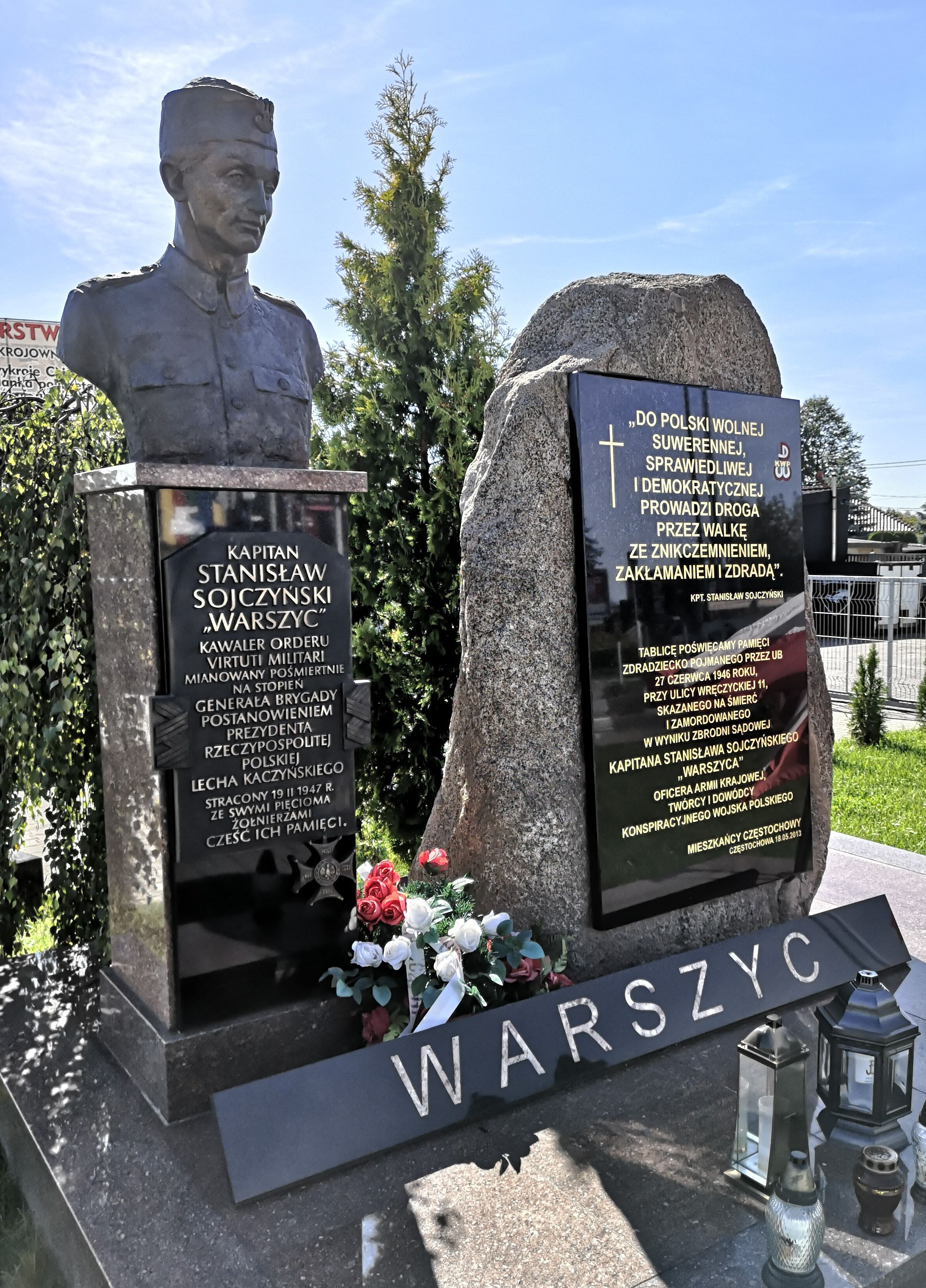
Monument to Stanisław Sojczyński, creator and leader of Konspiracyjne Wojsko Polskie, in Częstochowa

In August 1945 KWP was strengthened by hundreds of members of the disbanded Home Army, who decided to continue fighting for free Poland. In its heyday, the organization had some 3000 armed members, most of them hid in the forests. It also published its own newspaper W swietle prawdy (In the light of truth).

In the spring of 1946 skirmishes between KWP and Urząd Bezpieczeństwa (UB) troops were frequent. In the night of April 19/20 of that year, KWP's unit under Jan Rogolka (nom de guerre "Grot") temporarily captured the town of Radomsko, releasing 57 persons incarcerated in local prison by the UB. Next day, a battle between UB and KWP took place in a nearby forest.

On June 28, 1946, due to treason, Sojczynski was captured by the UB. Soon afterwards, KWP's structures in Upper Silesia were destroyed, but the organization did not cease to exist. However, with new leader, Jerzy Jasinski (nom de guerre "Janusz"), it did not regain its previous strength. At the beginning of 1947 most commanders were arrested, soon afterwards the government declared amnesty and hundreds of underground soldiers took advantage of it. In November of that year another leader, Jan Malolepszy ("Murat") was arrested.

Remains of KWP continued the hopeless fight and remained in forests south of Łódź until 1954.

== See also ==
- Cursed soldiers
- 1951 Mokotów Prison execution

== Sources ==
- http://powstanie-warszawskie-1944.ac.pl/zw_kwp.htm
- http://podziemiezbrojne.blox.pl/html/1310721,262146,21.html?335321
- http://hczarnecki.republika.pl/wykazorg.htm
- http://www.opcja.pop.pl/numer51/51krzy.html%5B%5D
