= Stanisław Sojczyński =

Polish army officer (1910–1947)

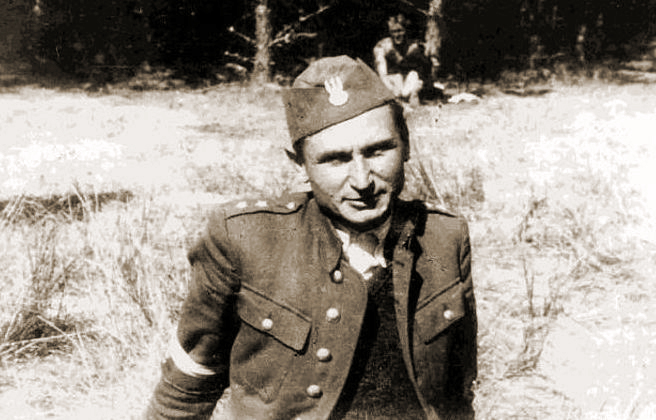
Stanisław Sojczyński „Warszyc” in August 1944

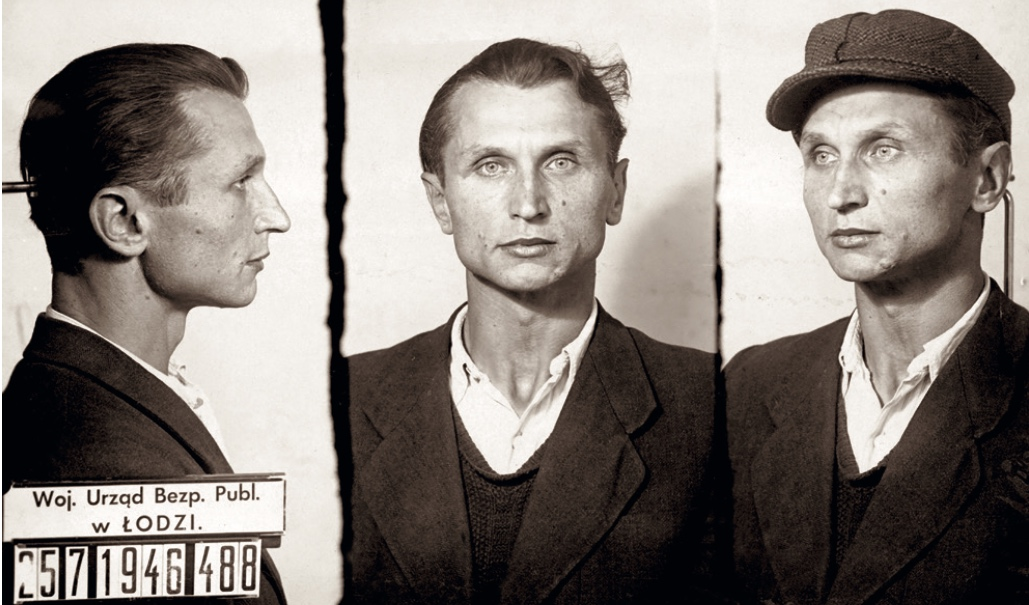
Stanisław Sojczyński "Warszyc", official photo of Ministry of Public Security (Poland) ( and the last known), just after his arrest in 1946

Stanisław Sojczyński (nom de guerre "Warszyc") (March 30, 1910 in Rzejowice – February 19, 1947 in Łódź) was a captain in the Polish Army and in the Home Army and later the creator and leader of Underground Polish Army (KWP). He was executed by communists in 1947. On September 11, 2009, Stanisław Sojczyński was posthumously promoted to the rank of Brigadier General by President of Poland, Lech Kaczyński.
