= Armed Forces Delegation for Poland =

Polish anticommunist resistance organization formed 1945

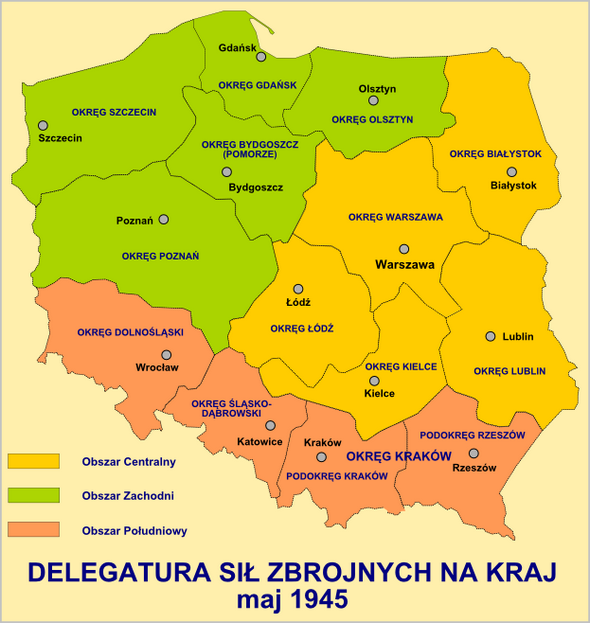
Regional districts of the Delegatura in postwar Poland – Central (yellow), West (green), and South (orange)

The Armed Forces Delegation for Poland (Delegatura Sił Zbrojnych na Kraj, DSZ) was a Polish anti-communist resistance organization formed on May 7, 1945, by the Commander-in-Chief of the Polish Armed Forces, General Władysław Anders, as a continuation of the NIE ("NO") organization subordinate to the Government Delegation for Poland (Polish: Delegatura Rządu Rzeczypospolitej Polskiej na Kraj) which in turn was an agency of the Polish Government in Exile. Its purpose was to oppose the Soviet occupation of Poland. It was dissolved on August 8, 1945.

The Delegation was commanded by Colonel Jan Rzepecki who selected as his deputy Colonel Janusz Bokszczanin. Its internal structure was based on that of the Home Army (Armia Krajowa). After its formal dissolution, a new anti-Communist organization was created: Freedom and Independence (Wolność i Niezawisłość, WiN).

The Armed Forces Delegation for Poland was divided into three areas:

- Central (under Colonel Jan Mazurkiewicz), covering the districts of Warsaw, Lublin, Kielce, Białystok and Łódź,
- Western (under Colonel Jan Szczurek-Cergowski), covering the districts of Bydgoszcz, Poznań, Gdańsk, Szczecin and Olsztyn,
- Southern (under Colonel Antoni Sanojca), covering the districts of Kraków, Rzeszów, Katowice and Wrocław.

== See also ==
- Government Delegation for Poland
- List of Government Delegates for Poland
