= Home Army Resistance Movement =

The Home Army Resistance Movement (Ruch Oporu Armii Krajowej) was a Polish anticommunist military resistance organization formed in 1944 by Józef Marcinkowski out of Armia Krajowa soldiers. Main goal was counteracting Soviet domination over Poland. They engaged in many skirmishes with the Internal Security Corps and NKVD soldiers and executed many Polish Workers' Party and UB collaborators.
