= NIE (resistance) =

Polish anti-communist resistance organization

NIE (Polish: [ˈɲɛ]; short for niepodległość 'independence', and also meaning 'no') was a Polish anticommunist resistance organisation formed in 1943. Its main goal was the struggle against the Soviet Union after 1944 (see Soviet occupation of Poland). NIE was one of the best hidden structures of Armia Krajowa, active until 7 May 1945. Its commanders were Generals Leopold Okulicki and Emil August Fieldorf. One of the first members of the organisation was Witold Pilecki.

Origins of the organization date back to the second half of 1943, when on September 27, the Polish government-in-exile stated that conspirational activities should be maintained during the possible Soviet occupation of the country. Organization, statutes and structure of NIE was created by high-ranking officers of the Home Army, and among those involved were General Tadeusz Komorowski, and Polish Commander in Chief, General Kazimierz Sosnkowski. Members of NIE were carefully selected, and ordered to break their ties with soldiers of the Home Army.

In May 1944, General Leopold Okulicki was named commander of NIE. The organization however failed to achieve its objectives, due to the Warsaw Uprising and Operation Tempest, which took place in the summer of 1944. Its structures were disorganized, and there was no communication with branches located east of the German-Soviet frontline. Most officers of NIE took part in the Warsaw Uprising, and after its capitulation were captured by the Wehrmacht. On November 22, 1944, General Okulicki was ordered to create a conspirational network in Eastern Borderlands, but his efforts failed. On January 16, 1945, a meeting of General Okulicki, General Fieldorf, Jan Stanislaw Jankowski and Stanislaw Jasiukowicz took place in Kraków. On March 7, however, Fieldorf was arrested by the NKVD, and sent to Siberia. On March 27, the Soviets arrested Okulicki (see Trial of the Sixteen). After these arrests, NIE was briefly commanded by Colonel Antoni Sanojca, who, with permission of General Wladyslaw Anders, dissolved it on May 7, 1945.

According to its statutes, NIE was an organization aimed at long-term anti-Communist activities. It concentrated on self-defense, propaganda, and gathering information, also about the morale of soldiers of both the Red Army, and the Armia Ludowa. NIE did not plan any guerilla activity.
