= History of the Jews in 20th-century Poland =

Aspect of Jewish history

Following the establishment of the Second Polish Republic after World War I and during the interwar period, the number of Jews in the country grew rapidly. According to the Polish national census of 1921, there were 2,845,364 Jews living in the Second Polish Republic; by late 1938 that number had grown by over 16 percent, to approximately 3,310,000, mainly through migration from Ukraine and the Soviet Russia. The average rate of permanent settlement was about 30,000 per annum. At the same time, every year around 100,000 Jews were passing through Poland in unofficial emigration overseas. Between the end of the Polish–Soviet War of 1919 and late 1938, the Jewish population of the Republic grew by nearly half a million, or over 464,000 persons. Jews preferred to live in the relatively-tolerant Poland rather than in the Soviet Union and continued to integrate, marry into Polish Gentile families, to bring them into their community through marriage, feel Polish and form an important part of Polish society. Between 1933 and 1938, around 25,000 German Jews fled Nazi Germany to sanctuary in Poland.

The Jewish community in Poland suffered the most in the ensuing Holocaust. From amongst the 6 million Polish citizens who perished during the occupation of Poland in World War II, roughly half (or 3 million) were Polish Jews murdered at the Nazi extermination camps of Auschwitz, Treblinka, Majdanek, Belzec, Sobibór, and Chełmno. Others died of starvation and maltreatment in the ghettos. Occupied Poland became the largest site of the Nazi extermination program since most of the targeted victims lived there. Only about 50,000–120,000 Polish Jews survived the war on native soil, along with up to 230,000 on Soviet soil. Soon after the war ended, Jewish survivors began to leave Poland in great numbers thanks to the repatriation agreement with the Soviet Union. Poland was the only Eastern Bloc country to allow free Jewish aliyah without visas or exit permits. The exodus took place in stages. Many left simply because they did not want to live in a communist country. Others did not wish to rebuild their lives where their families were murdered and instead joined their relatives abroad.

== Polish independence movement ==
As soon as the Polish independence movement took hold in 1912 to 1914 with the aim to put forth an armed struggle for sovereign Poland after a century of partitions, the main freedom organization was formed, Komisja Skonfederowanych Stronnictw Niepodległościowych, and served as an interim government. Polish Jews played a significant role in it such Herman Feldstein, Henryk Eile (future Lieutenant of the Polish Army), Samuel Herschthal, Zygmunt Leser, Henryk Orlean, Wiktor Chajes, who worked in its various sub-commissions. Also, Jews made substantial financial contributions to the formation of the Polish military fund, Polski Skarb Wojskowy.

== Interwar period (1918–1939) ==
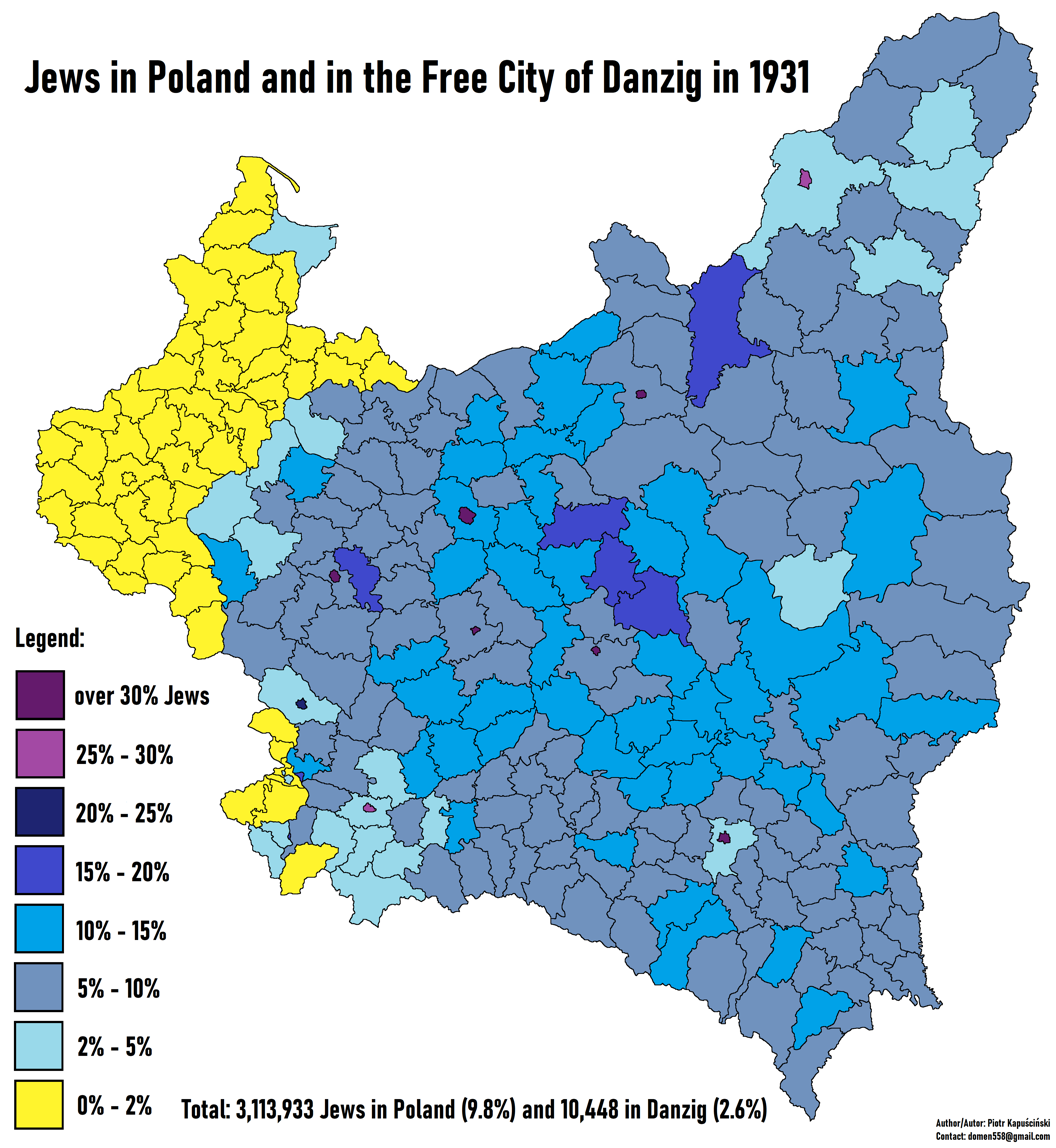
Percentage of Jewish (by religion) population in each county of Poland according to the 1931 census

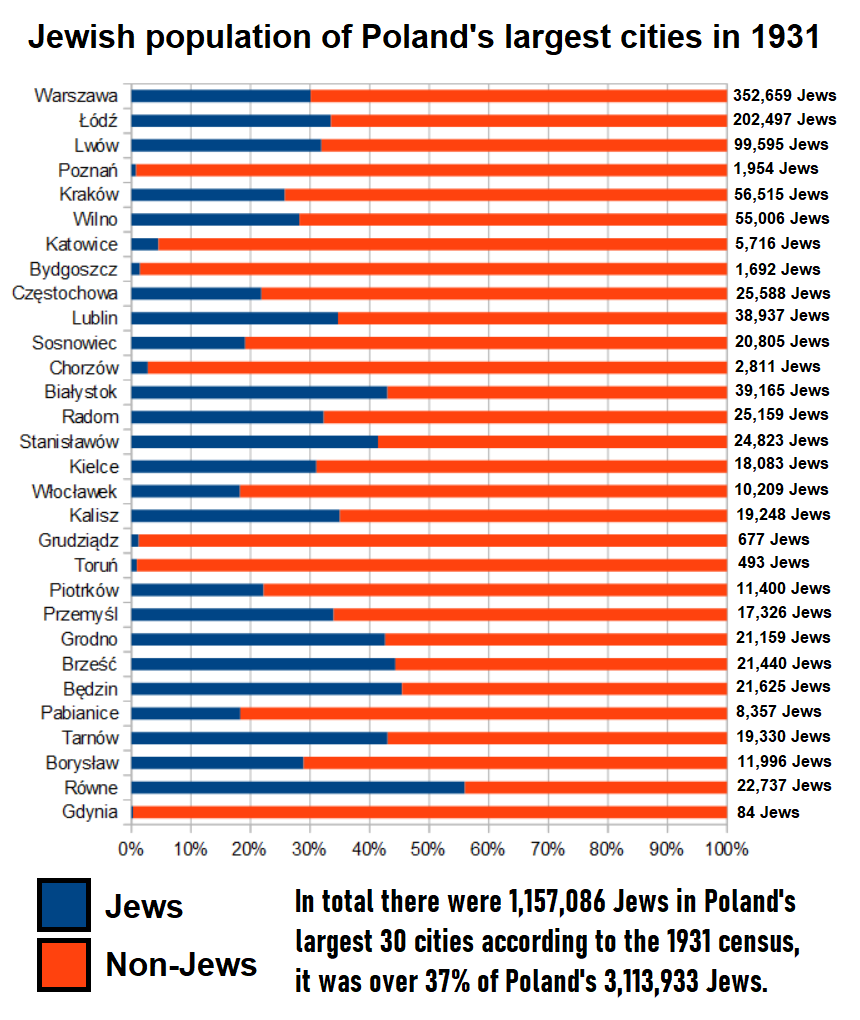
Jewish population of Poland's largest cities in 1931

During World War I, while many other non-Polish minorities were ambivalent or neutral to the idea of a sovereign Polish state, Jews actively participated in the fight for Poland's independence between 1914 and 1918 – a significant number joining Józef Piłsudski at the famous Oleandry area in Kraków, among them Bronisław Mansperl-Chaber killed in 1915 as the First Lieutenant of 1st Brigade, Polish Legions. In Lwów, chaired by Maria Loewenstein, two existing Jewish Women's Associations united as Ognisko Kobiet, for the purpose of financial support and caring for the families of soldiers and their children. Representatives of the local Jewish merchant associations adopted a resolution declaring their participation in the struggle for Poland's independence and issued an appeal to the Jewish masses. Similar proclamations came from the Jewish youth organization Zjednoczenie.

During the military conflicts that engulfed Eastern Europe at the time—the Russian Civil War, Polish–Ukrainian War, and Polish–Soviet War—many pogroms were launched against the Jews by all sides. A substantial number of Jews were perceived to have supported the Bolsheviks in Russia. They came under frequent attack by all those opposed to the Bolshevik regime. Just after the end of World War I, the West became alarmed by reports about alleged massive pogroms in Poland against Jews. American pressure for government action reached the point where president Woodrow Wilson sent an official commission to investigate the issue. The commission, led by Henry Morgenthau Sr., announced that the reports of pogroms were exaggerated, and in some cases may have even been fabricated. It identified eighty-nine major incidents in years 1918–1919, and estimated the number of victims at 200–300 Jews. Four of these were attributed to the actions of deserters and undisciplined individual soldiers; none were blamed on official government policy. Among the incidents, in Pinsk a Polish officer accused a group of Jewish communists of plotting against the Poles, shooting 35 of them. In Lviv (then Lemberg) in 1918, as the Polish army captured the city, hundreds of people were killed in the chaos, among them about 72 Jews. In Warsaw soldiers of Blue Army assaulted Jews on the streets, but they were punished by military authorities. When the Polish troops entered Vilnius in 1919, the first Lithuanian pogrom in modern city on Lithuanian Jews took place, as noted by Timothy Snyder, citing Michał Pius Römer. Many other events in Poland were later found to have been exaggerated, especially by contemporary newspapers like The New York Times, although serious abuses against the Jews, including pogroms, continued elsewhere, especially in the Ukraine. The result of the concern over the fate of the Jews of western Poland was a series of explicit clauses in the Paris Peace Conference protecting the rights of Jews in Poland.

=== Jewish and Polish culture ===
The newly independent Second Polish Republic had a large Jewish minority—by the time World War II began, Poland had the largest concentration of Jews in Europe. According to the 1931 Polish census there were 3,130,581 Polish Jews measured by the declaration of their religion. Taking into account both population increase and the emigration from Poland between 1931 and 1939, there were around 3,474,000 Jews in Poland as of September 1, 1939 (approximately 10% of the total population). Jews were primarily centered in large agglomerations: 77% lived in the cities and 23% in the villages. In 1939 there were 375,000 Jews in Warsaw, or one third of the city's population. Only New York City had more Jewish residents than Warsaw. Jewish religious groups, political parties, newspapers and theatre thrived. Most Warsaw Jews spoke Yiddish, but Polish was increasingly used by the young who have not had a problem in identifying themselves fully as Jews, Varsovians and Poles. Polish Jews were entering the mainstream of Polish society, though many thought of themselves as a separate nationality within Poland. During the school year of 1937–1938 there were 226 elementary schools and twelve high schools as well as fourteen vocational schools with either Yiddish or Hebrew as the instructional language. The YIVO (Jidiszer Wissenszaftlecher) Scientific Institute was based in Wilno before transferring to New York during the war. Jewish political parties, both the Socialist General Jewish Labour Bund (The Bund) as well as parties of the Zionist right and left wing and religious conservative movements, were represented in the Sejm (the Polish Parliament) as well as in the regional councils.

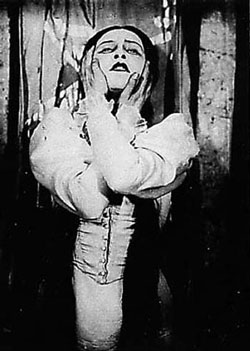
Hanna Rovina as Leah'le in The Dybbuk.

The Jewish cultural scene was particularly vibrant and blossomed in pre-World War II Poland. There were many Jewish publications and over 116 periodicals. Yiddish authors, most notably Isaac Bashevis Singer, went on to achieve international acclaim as classic Jewish writers, and in Singer's case, win the 1978 Nobel Prize in Literature. Other Jewish authors of the period, like Janusz Korczak, Bruno Schulz, Julian Tuwim, Jan Brzechwa (a favorite poet of Polish children) and Bolesław Leśmian were less well known internationally, but made important contributions to Polish literature. Singer Jan Kiepura was one of the most popular artist of that era and pre-war songs of Jewish composers like Henryk Wars or Jerzy Petersburski are still widely known in Poland today. In 1918 Julian Tuwim co-founded the cabaret, "Picador," and worked as a writer or artistic director with many other cabarets such as "Czarny kot" (Black Cat 1917–1919), "Qui Pro Quo" (1919–1932), "Banda" The Gang and "Stara Banda" The Old Gang (1932–1935) and finally "Cyrulik Warszawski" (Barber of Warsaw 1935–1939). Marian Hemar also wrote for some of the mentioned cabarets. Scientist Leopold Infeld, mathematician Stanisław Ulam or professor Adam Ulam contributed to the world of science. Others are Moses Schorr, Georges Charpak, Samuel Eilenberg, Emanuel Ringelblum just to name a few from the long list of Polish Jews who are known internationally. The term genocide was coined by Raphael Lemkin (1900–1959), a Polish-Jewish legal scholar. Leonid Hurwicz was awarded the 2007 Nobel Prize in Economics. The Main Judaic Library and the Institute of Judaic Studies were located in Warsaw, religious centers had at their disposal Talmudic Schools (Jeszybots), as well as synagogues, many of which were architecturally outstanding. Yiddish theatre also flourished; Poland had fifteen Yiddish theatres and theatrical groups. Warsaw was home to the most important Yiddish theater troupe of the time, the Vilna Troupe, which staged the first performance of The Dybbuk in 1920 at the Elyseum Theatre. Some future Israeli leaders studied at University of Warsaw—Menachem Begin and Yitzhak Shamir, among others. The influence of Polish and Jewish cultures was reciprocal. Jewish chess players such as Akiba Rubinstein were ranked among the best, and they contributed to the Polish world championship in 1930. Many Yiddish-language films were produced in Poland, including Yidl Mitn Fidl (1936), The Dybbuk (1937), Der Purimszpiler (1937), and Mamele (1938). In 1937, the Polish-Jewish community was served by 150 Yiddish-language newspapers and journals (with a combined circulation of 600,000) and a number of Polish-language newspapers (circulation 180,000).

=== Economy ===
An ever-increasing proportion of Jews in Interwar Poland lived separate lives from the Polish majority. In 1921, 74.2% of Polish Jews listed Yiddish or Hebrew as their native language, but that had risen to 87% by 1931, resulting in growing tensions between Jews and Poles. Jews were often not identified as Polish nationals, a problem that was caused not only by the reversal of assimilation, which was shown in national censuses between 1921 and 1931, but also by the influx of Soviet Jews escaping persecution especially in Ukraine, where up to 2,000 pogroms took place during the Russian Civil War in which an estimated 30,000 Jews were massacred directly and a total of 150,000 died. A large number of Jews immigrated to Poland from the east, as they were entitled by the Peace of Riga to choose the country that they preferred. Several hundred thousand refugees joined the already numerous Jewish minority of the Polish Second Republic. More than 75% of them lived in urban areas. There was, therefore, a disproportionate concentration of Jews in those communities who were disproportionately women, children and elderly. Poland was an underdeveloped country that struggled with the remnants of devastating economic exploitation by the partitioners and their ensuing trade embargos (see also German–Polish customs war). For many years, there was widespread poverty among all citizens regardless of ethnicity but especially among the unemployed Jews for whom the help from the American Jewish Joint Distribution Committee was slow in coming. Plans for their retraining, considered by the committee in 1929, were out of touch with the depth of the Polish depression. The average standard of living of Polish Jews was among the worst among major Jewish communities in the world. The mostly-nonexistent new job opportunities before Poland's industrialization of the mid-1930s were blamed on anti-Semitism, but Jewish per capita income among the working Jews was more than 40% higher in 1929 than that of Polish non-Jews. The impoverished families relied on local Jewish charity, which had reached universally unprecedented proportions in 1929, providing services such as religion, education, health and other services to the amount of 200 million zlotys a year. The effects of the Great Depression had been very severe.

=== Population ===
According to the Polish national census of 1921, there were 2,845,364 Jews living in the Second Polish Republic. According to the national census of 1931, there were 3,113,933 Jews living in Poland. By late 1938 that number had grown to approximately 3,310,000. According to the 1931 census one city had over 350,000 Jewish inhabitants (Warsaw), one city had over 200,000 Jewish inhabitants (Lodz), one city had around 100,000 Jewish inhabitants (Lvov) and two cities had over 50,000 Jewish inhabitants each (Cracow and Vilno). In total these five cities had 766,272 Jews which was almost 25% of the total Jewish population of Poland. In cities and towns larger than 25,000 inhabitants there lived nearly 44% of Poland's Jews.

The table below shows the Jewish population of Poland's cities and towns with over 25,000 inhabitants according to the 1931 census:

Jewish population in cities and towns of Poland with at least 25,000 inhabitants in 1931
City or town #	Voivodeship	City or town	Total population	Jews	Non-Jews	Percentage of Jews
1	Warsaw Voivodeship	Warszawa	1171898	352659	819239	30.1%
2	Łódź Voivodeship	Łódź	604629	202497	402132	33.5%
3	Lwów Voivodeship	Lwów	312231	99595	212636	31.9%
4	Poznań Voivodeship	Poznań	246470	1954	244516	0.8%
5	Kraków Voivodeship	Kraków	219286	56515	162771	25.8%
6	Wilno Voivodeship	Wilno	195071	55006	140065	28.2%
7	Silesian Voivodeship	Katowice	126058	5716	120342	4.5%
8	Poznań Voivodeship	Bydgoszcz	117200	1692	115508	1.4%
9	Kielce Voivodeship	Częstochowa	117179	25588	91591	21.8%
10	Lublin Voivodeship	Lublin	112285	38937	73348	34.7%
11	Kielce Voivodeship	Sosnowiec	108959	20805	88154	19.1%
12	Silesian Voivodeship	Chorzów	101977	2811	99166	2.8%
13	Białystok Voivodeship	Białystok	91101	39165	51936	43.0%
14	Kielce Voivodeship	Radom	77902	25159	52743	32.3%
15	Stanisławów Voivodeship	Stanisławów	59960	24823	35137	41.4%
16	Kielce Voivodeship	Kielce	58236	18083	40153	31.1%
17	Warsaw Voivodeship	Włocławek	55966	10209	45757	18.2%
18	Łódź Voivodeship	Kalisz	55007	19248	35759	35.0%
19	Pomeranian Voivodeship	Grudziądz	54014	677	53337	1.3%
20	Pomeranian Voivodeship	Toruń	53993	493	53500	0.9%
21	Łódź Voivodeship	Piotrków	51349	11400	39949	22.2%
22	Lwów Voivodeship	Przemyśl	51038	17326	33712	33.9%
23	Białystok Voivodeship	Grodno	49669	21159	28510	42.6%
24	Polesie Voivodeship	Brześć	48385	21440	26945	44.3%
25	Kielce Voivodeship	Będzin	47597	21625	25972	45.4%
26	Łódź Voivodeship	Pabianice	45670	8357	37313	18.3%
27	Kraków Voivodeship	Tarnów	44927	19330	25597	43.0%
28	Lwów Voivodeship	Borysław	41496	11996	29500	28.9%
29	Wołyń Voivodeship	Równe	40612	22737	17875	56.0%
30	Łódź Voivodeship	Tomaszów Maz.	38020	11310	26710	29.7%
31	Kielce Voivodeship	Dąbrowa Górnicza	36942	5150	31792	13.9%
32	Lublin Voivodeship	Siedlce	36931	14793	22138	40.1%
33	Tarnopol Voivodeship	Tarnopol	35644	13999	21645	39.3%
34	Wołyń Voivodeship	Łuck	35554	17366	18188	48.8%
35	Stanisławów Voivodeship	Kołomyja	33788	14332	19456	42.4%
36	Pomeranian Voivodeship	Gdynia	33217	84	33133	0.3%
37	Warsaw Voivodeship	Płock	32998	6571	26427	19.9%
38	Kielce Voivodeship	Zawiercie	32872	5677	27195	17.3%
39	Lwów Voivodeship	Drohobycz	32261	12931	19330	40.1%
40	Polesie Voivodeship	Pińsk	31912	20220	11692	63.4%
41	Poznań Voivodeship	Inowrocław	34364	139	34225	0.4%
42	Stanisławów Voivodeship	Stryj	30491	10869	19622	35.6%
43	Kraków Voivodeship	Nowy Sącz	30298	9084	21214	30.0%
44	Poznań Voivodeship	Gniezno	30675	137	30538	0.4%
45	Lublin Voivodeship	Chełm	29074	13537	15537	46.6%
46	Wołyń Voivodeship	Kowel	27677	12842	14835	46.4%
47	Lwów Voivodeship	Rzeszów	26902	11228	15674	41.7%
48	Łódź Voivodeship	Zgierz	26618	4547	22071	17.1%
49	Kielce Voivodeship	Ostrowiec	25908	9934	15974	38.3%
50	Warsaw Voivodeship	Żyrardów	25115	2726	22389	10.9%
51	Białystok Voivodeship	Łomża	25022	8912	16110	35.6%
Total in 51 cities and towns with over 25,000 inhabitants			5052448	1363390	3689058	27.0%

=== Rising Anti-Semitism ===
The political situation of Jews in Poland was most amiable under the rule of Józef Piłsudski (1926–1935). Piłsudski replaced Endecja's 'ethnic assimilation' with the 'state assimilation' policy: citizens were judged by their loyalty to the state, not by their nationality. The years 1926–1935 were favourably viewed by many Polish Jews, whose situation improved especially under the cabinet of Pilsudski's appointee Kazimierz Bartel. However, a combination of various reasons, including the Great Depression, meant that the situation of Polish Jews was never too satisfactory, and it deteriorated again after Piłsudski's death in May 1935. Many Jews regarded his death as tragedy, since no pogroms were perpetrated during his term in office. Both Polish Jews and Polish Gentiles had nationalist movements of their own. Revisionist Zionism had a following among Polish Jews, who also experienced the revival of the Hebrew language and a growth of the idea of Aliyah. Meanwhile, the Polish nationalist Endecja movement and the National Radical Camp were also openly anti-Semitic despite being anti-Nazi. With their party influence growing, antisemitism gathered a new momentum and was most felt in smaller towns and in public arenas. In Grodno, antisemitic incidents led to the creation of a student self-defense group called Brit HaHayal (Soldier's Alliance) consisting of stronger Jewish youth. Polish high-school students, influenced by the Endeks, bullied their Jewish colleagues to stand up. The teachers were usually afraid to intervene. Jewish children often fell victim to antisemitic incidents on their way to or from school. Further academic harassment, anti-Jewish riots, and semi-official or unofficial quotas (Numerus clausus) introduced in 1937 in some universities cut in half the number of Jews in Polish universities into the late 1930s. From 1935 to 1937, 79 Jews were killed and 500 injured in anti-Semitic incidents.

The Jewish community in Poland was large and vibrant internally, yet substantially poorer and less integrated than the Jews in most of Western Europe. Towards the end of the 1930s, despite the impending threat to the Polish Republic from Nazi Germany, there was little effort seen in the way of reconciliation between Polish and Jewish societies. Many Polish Christians held that there were far too many Jews in the country. Polish government began actively helping the Zionist movement with its goal of creating the state of Israel, and armed and trained Polish Jews in paramilitary groups such as Haganah, Irgun and Lehi. Antisemitism in Poland was escalating. Discrimination and violence against Jews sweeping across much of Central and Eastern Europe had rendered the Polish Jewish population increasingly destitute. In 1937 the Catholic trade unions of Polish doctors and lawyers restricted their new members to Christian Poles while many government jobs continued to be unavailable to Jews during this entire period. In July 1939 Gazeta Polska, the unofficial organ of the Polish government wrote: "The fact that our relations with the Reich are worsening does not in the least deactivate our program in the Jewish question—there is not and cannot be any common ground between our internal Jewish problem and Poland's relations with the Hitlerite Reich." Escalating hostility towards Polish Jews and the official government support for Jewish Palestine led by Ze'ev Jabotinsky continued right up until the Nazi invasion of Poland.

== World War II and the destruction of Polish Jewry (1939–1945) ==
Until the outbreak of World War II, the relations between the Jews and the local Gentile population – which contained Byelorussians, Ukrainians but mostly Poles – had been generally good with the exception of Eastern Poland, especially the Wołyń area, where Jewish shopkeepers were ruthlessly chased out by the Ukrainian nationalists from some 3,000 villages. On August 23, 1939, the Soviet Union and Nazi Germany entered into a Non-Aggression Pact, the Molotov–Ribbentrop Pact, with a secret protocol providing for the partition of Poland. On September 1, 1939, Germany attacked Poland and two weeks later, the Soviets invaded on September 17, 1939.

Unlike the Vichy French or the Norwegian Quisling regime, Poles did not form a pro-Nazi collaborationist government. Further, Poles did not form collaborationist Nazi units such as the 29th Waffen Grenadier Division of the SS RONA (1st Russian).

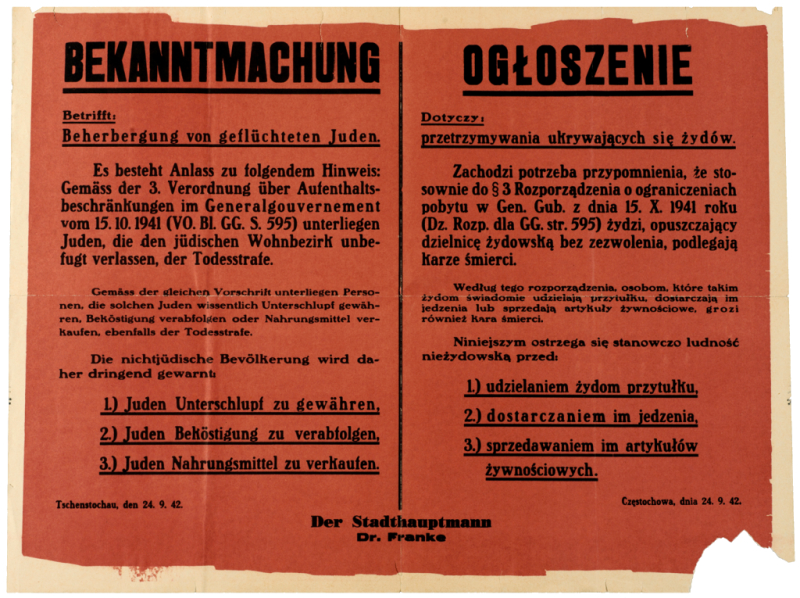
NOTICE Concerning: the Sheltering of Escaping Jews. There is a need for a reminder, that in accordance with paragraph 3 of the decree of October 15, 1941, on the Limitation of Residence in General Government (page 595 of the GG Register) Jews leaving the Jewish Quarter without permission will incur the death penalty. According to this decree, those knowingly helping these Jews by providing shelter, supplying food, or selling them foodstuffs are also subject to the death penalty This is a categorical warning to the non-Jewish population against: 1) Providing shelter to Jews, 2) Supplying them with Food, 3) Selling them Foodstuffs. Częstochowa 9/24/42 Der Stadthauptmann Dr. Franke

=== The Polish September campaign ===
The number of Jews in Poland on September 1, 1939, amounted to about 3,474,000 people. In anticipation of the German attack, during the Summer of 1939, Jews and ethnic Poles cooperated preparing anti-tank fortifications. Contrary to many misconceptions, Jews in Poland were not simply victims of the ensuing Holocaust. Jewish Polish soldiers were among the first, to launch armed resistance against the Nazi German forces during the 1939 Invasion of Poland.

Among one million Polish soldiers fighting the Germans in September 1939, about 10 percent (100,000) were Polish Jews, which corresponded to the percentage of the Jewish population living in Poland before the war. It is estimated that during the entirety of World War II as many as 32,216 Jewish soldiers and officers died and 61,000 were taken prisoner by the Germans; the majority did not survive. The soldiers and non-commissioned officers who were released ultimately found themselves in the ghettos and labor camps and suffered the same fate as other Jewish civilians. Germans killed about 20 000 civilians in September 1939, a number of them Jewish. For example, in Częstochowa 227 civilians were murdered on September the 4th, 22 of them Jewish.

Already in 1939 several hundreds synagogues were blown up or burned down by the Germans who sometimes forced the Jews to do it themselves. In many cases the Germans turned the remaining synagogues into storage facilities, workshops, places of entertainment, or ad-hoc prisons. Rabbis and other religious Jews were ordered to dance and sing in public with their beards cut or torn. Within weeks, Germans ordered all Polish Jews to register and the word "Jude" was stamped on their identity cards. Jews were placed outside the law and their lives were regulated by orders or edicts. Series of restrictions and prohibitions were introduced and brutally enforced. Jews were forbidden to walk on the sidewalks, use public transport, enter places of leisure, sports arenas, theaters, museums and libraries. On the street Jews had to lift their hat to passing Germans and contact between Jews and non-Jews was banned.

== The German-Soviet occupation of Poland ==
In newly partitioned Poland, according to 1931 census, 61.2% of Polish Jews found themselves under German occupation while 38.8% were in the Polish areas annexed by the Soviet Union. Based on population migration from West to East during and after the Invasion of Poland the percentage of Jews in the Soviet-occupied areas was probably higher than that of the 1931 census.

The Soviet annexation was accompanied by the widespread arrests of Polish government officials, police and military personnel, teachers, priests, judges, border guards, etc., followed by executions and massive deportation to Soviet interior and forced labour camps were many perished as a result of harsh conditions. The largest group of all those arrested or deported were ethnic Poles but Jews accounted for significant percentage of all the prisoners. Jewish refugees from Western Poland who registered for repatriation back to the German zone, wealthy Jewish capitalists, prewar political and social activists were labelled "class enemies" and deported for that reason. Jews caught for illegal border crossings or engaged in illicit trade and other "illegal" activities were also arrested and deported. Several thousand, mostly captured Polish soldiers were executed on the spot, some of them were Jewish. Private property, land, banks, factories, businesses, shops, and large workshops were nationalized. Political activity ceased and political prisoners filled the jails, many of whom were later executed. Zionism was designated as counter-revolutionary and forbidden. All Jewish and Polish newspapers were shut down within a day of the entry of the Soviet forces and anti-religious propaganda was conducted mainly through the new Soviet press which attacked religion in general and the Jewish faith in particular. Although the synagogues and churches were not shut down, they were heavily taxed. Sovietization of the economy affected the entire population. However, the Jewish communities were more vulnerable because of their distinctive social and economic structure. Red Army also brought with them new and different economic norms expressed in low wages, shortages in materials, rising prices, and a declining living standard. The Soviets also implemented a new employment policy that enabled many Jews to find jobs as civil servants in place of former Polish senior officials and leading personalities who were arrested and exiled to remote regions of Russia together with their families. Some Jewish militia participated in deportations of Poles by the Soviet NKVD.

=== Patriotism ===
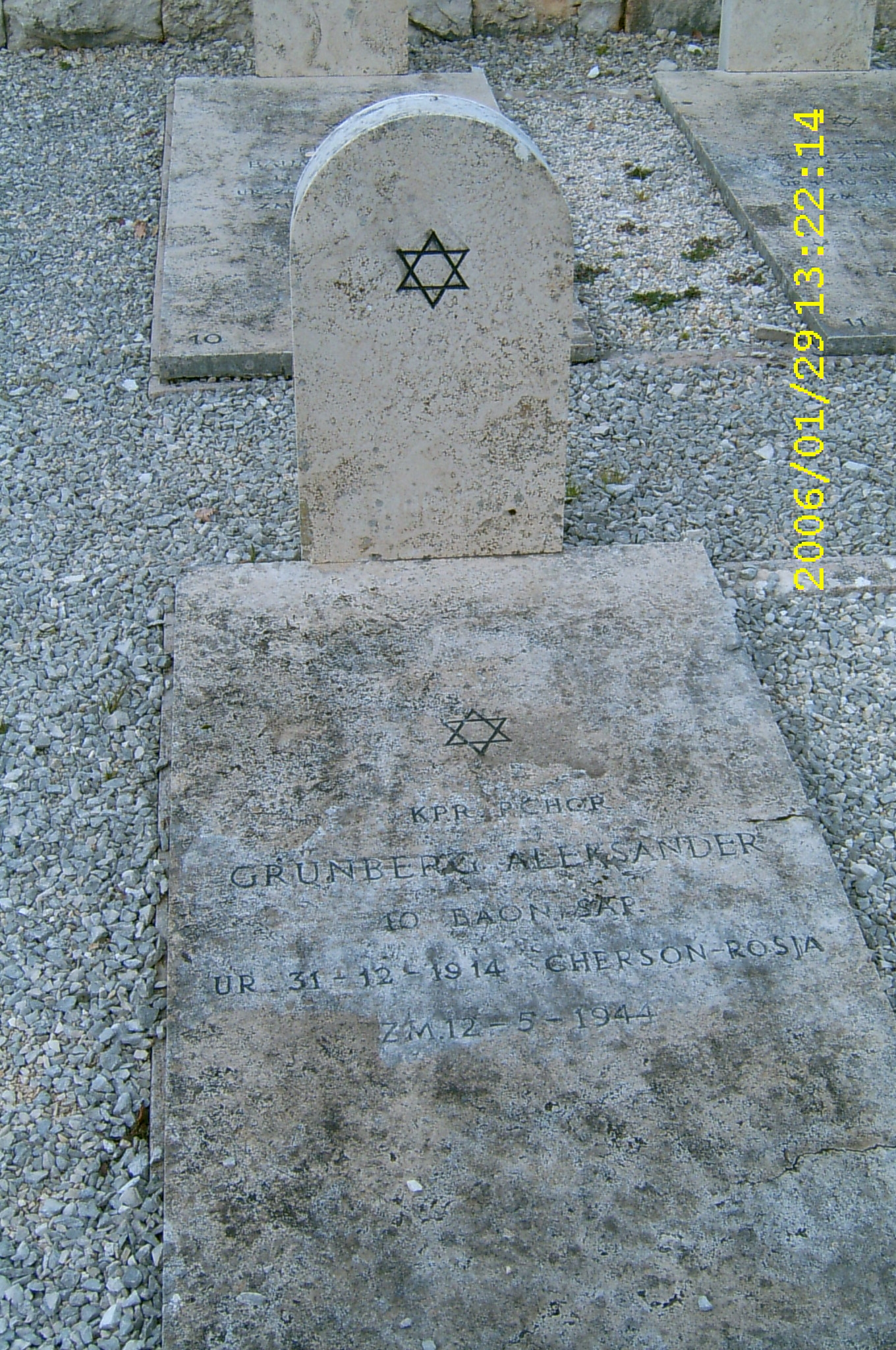
Jewish gravestone at Monte Cassino

There were many Jews who considered themselves both good Poles and good Jews and demonstrated loyalty toward Poland, assisting Poles during brutal Soviet occupation. Among Polish officers killed by the NKVD in 1940 in the Katyń massacre there were 500–600 Jews, among them Baruch Steinberg, Chief Rabbi of the Polish Army during German invasion of Poland. From 1939 to 1941 between 100,000 and 300,000 Polish Jews were deported from Soviet-occupied Polish territory into the Soviet Union. Some of them, especially Polish Communists (e.g. Jakub Berman), moved voluntarily; however, most of them were forcibly deported, some of them to Gulag. Small numbers of Polish Jews (about 6,000) were able to leave the Soviet Union in 1942 with the Władysław Anders army, among them the future prime minister of Israel Menachem Begin. During the Polish army's II Corps' stay in the British Mandate of Palestine, 67% (2,972) of the Jewish soldiers deserted, many to join the Irgun. General Anders decided not to prosecute the deserters. The cemetery of Polish soldiers who died during the Battle of Monte Cassino and the one in Casamassima contains also headstones bearing a Star of David.

The wartime continuation of the Second Polish Republic, the Polish Government in Exile, included Polish Jewish representatives: Szmul Zygielbojm and Ignacy Schwarzbart. The Polish Underground State and its military arm, the Armia Krajowa, as one of the largest anti-Nazi resistance movements in Europe, included Jewish units: the Jewish Military Union and the Jewish Combat Organization.

=== Collaboration ===
While most Poles of all ethnicities had anti-Soviet and anti-communist sentiments, a portion of the Jewish population, along with ethnic Belarusians, Ukrainians and communist Poles had initially welcomed Soviet forces. The general feeling amongst Polish Jews was a sense of relief in having escaped the dangers of falling under Nazi rule, as well as from the overt policies of discrimination against Jews which existed in the Polish state, including discrimination in education, employment and commerce, as well as antisemitic violence that in some cases reached pogrom levels. The Polish poet and former communist Aleksander Wat has stated that Jews were more inclined to cooperate with the Soviets Norman Davies noted that among the informers and collaborators, the percentage of Jews was striking, and they prepared lists of Polish "class enemies", while other historians have indicated that the level of Jewish collaboration could well have been less than that of ethnic Poles. Holocaust scholar Martin Dean has written that "few local Jews obtained positions of power under Soviet rule."

The issue of Jewish collaboration with the Soviet occupation remains controversial. A large group of scholars note that while not pro-communist, many Jews saw the Soviets as the lesser threat compared to the Nazis. They stress that stories of Jews welcoming the Soviets on the streets are largely impressionistic and not reliable indicators of the level of Jewish support for the Soviets. Additionally, it has been noted that ethnic Poles were as prominent as Jews were in filling civil and police positions in the occupation administration, and that Jews, both civilians and in the Polish military, suffered equally at the hands of the Soviet occupiers. Whatever initial enthusiasm for the Soviet occupation Jews might have felt was soon dissipated upon feeling the impact of the suppression of Jewish societal modes of life by the occupiers. The tensions between ethnic Poles and Jews as a result of this period has, according to some historians, taken a toll on relations between Poles and Jews throughout the war, creating until this day, an impasse to Polish-Jewish rapprochement.

Following Operation Barbarossa, numerous atrocities were carried out in the territories formerly occupied by the Soviets, some of them with help from Poles themselves as in the case of the massacre in Jedwabne in which some 300 Jewish citizens of Jedwabne were burned alive in a barn (Institute of National Remembrance: Final Findings). The Polish participation in massacres of the Polish Jewish community remains a controversial subject, in part due to the Jewish leaders refusing to allow the remains of the Jewish victims to be exhumed and their cause of death to be properly established. The Polish Institute for National Remembrance identified other pogroms similar to Jedwabne. The reasons for these massacres are still debated, but they included resentment over the cooperation with the Soviet invaders and prior collaboration in the Polish-Soviet War and the 1939 invasion of the Kresy regions, not to mention coercion by the Nazis to participate in German massacres.

Only a small percentage of the Jewish community had been members of the Communist Party of Poland during the interwar era, though they had occupied an influential and conspicuous place in the party's leadership and in the rank and file in major centres, such as Warsaw, Lodz and Lwow. A larger number of younger Jews, often through the pro-Marxist Bund (General Jewish Workers' Union) or some Zionist groups, were sympathetic to Communism and Soviet Russia, both of which had been enemies of the Polish Second Republic. As a result of these factors they found it easy after 1939 to participate in the Soviet occupation administration in Eastern Poland, and briefly occupied prominent positions in industry, schools, local government, police and other Soviet-installed institutions. The antisemitic Polish concept of "Judeo-communism" was reinforced during the period of the Soviet occupation (see Żydokomuna).

== The Holocaust in German-occupied Poland ==
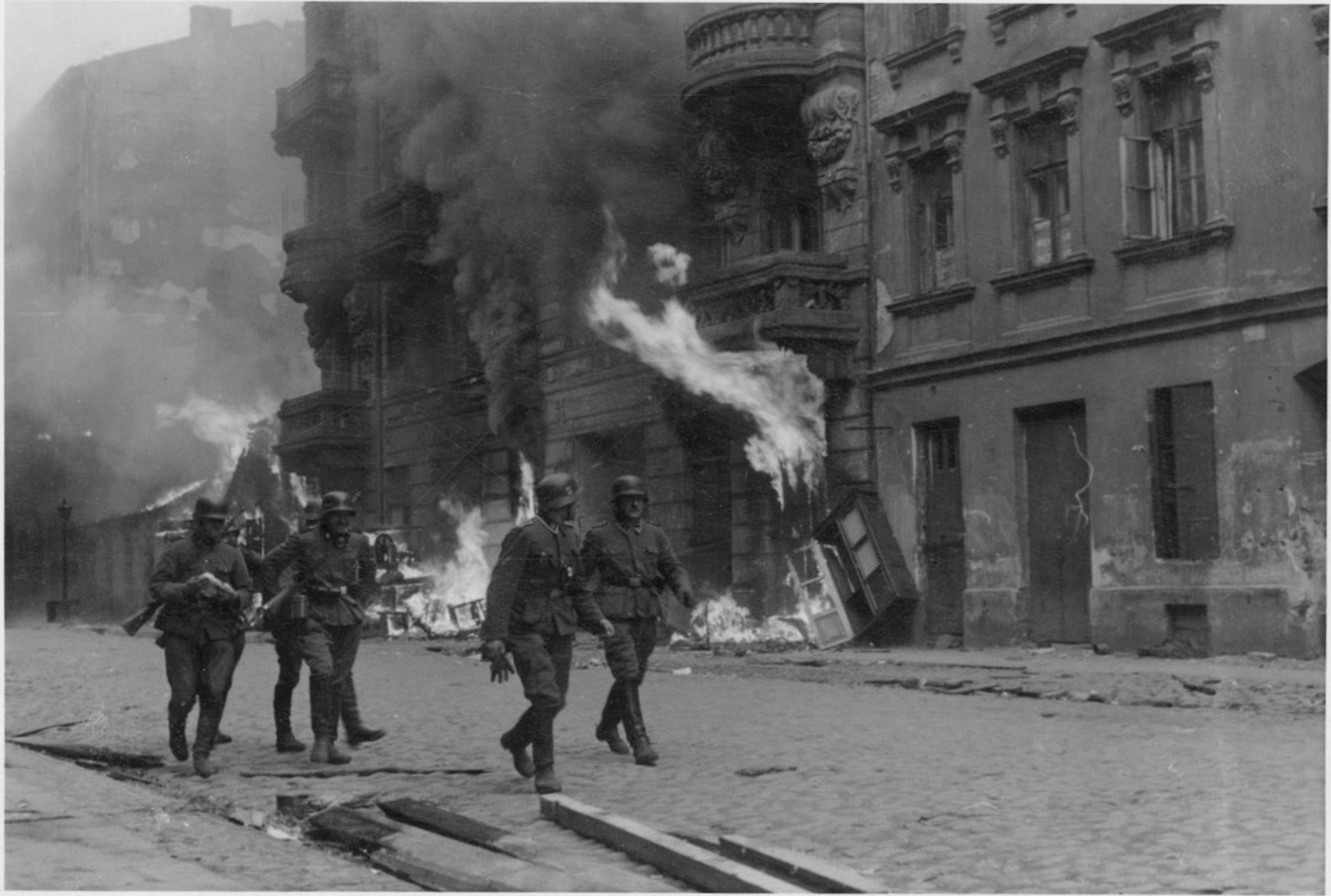
The Warsaw Ghetto Uprising of 1943 saw the destruction of what remained of the ghetto

By the end of 1941 all Jews in German-occupied Poland were ghettoized. Except the children, they had to wear an identifying badge with a blue Star of David. Many Jews in what was then eastern Poland also fell victim to mobile Nazi death squads called Einsatzgruppen, which massacred Jews especially in 1941. Poland was the only occupied country during World War II where the Nazis formally imposed the death penalty for anybody found sheltering and helping Jews. Food rations for Poles were very small (669 kcal per day in 1941) and black market prices of food were high, factors which made difficult to hide people and almost impossible to hide entire families, especially in the cities. Despite these draconian measures imposed by the Nazis, Poland has the highest number of Righteous Among the Nations awards at the Yad Vashem Museum.

The Germans established hundreds of ghettos in which Jews were confined and starved although cruelly offered hopes of survival before eventually being subjected to genocide. The Warsaw Ghetto was the largest, with 380,000 people and the Łódź Ghetto, the second largest, holding about 160,000. Other Polish cities with large Jewish ghettos included Białystok, Częstochowa, Kielce, Kraków, Lublin, Lwów, and Radom. Ghettos were also established in smaller settlements. Living conditions in the ghettos were terrible. Jews who tried to escape were shot to death with their bullet-riddled bodies to be left in public view until dusk as a warning. Many of those who fled to the Aryan side without connections with Christian Poles willing to risked their lives in order to help, returned to the ghettos when they were unable to find a place to hide. Hundreds of four- to five-year-old Jewish children went across en masse to the Aryan side, sometimes several times a day, smuggling food into the ghettos, returning with goods that often weighed more than they did. Smuggling was sometimes the only source of subsistence for these children and their parents, who would otherwise have died of starvation. Shooting of Jews who were caught trying to smuggle in food became routine. People were shot to death for bringing in a chicken or a liter of milk. Poles from the Aryan side found assisting Jews in obtained food were subject to the death penalty.

=== The Warsaw Ghetto ===
The Warsaw Ghetto was established by the German governor-general Hans Frank on October 16, 1940. The German authorities allowed a Jewish Council (Judenrat) of 24 men, led by Adam Czerniaków, to form its own police to maintain order in the ghetto. Judenrat was also responsible for organizing the labour battalions demanded by the Germans. At this time, the population of the ghetto was estimated to be about 380,000 people, about 30% of the population of Warsaw. However, the size of the ghetto was about 2.4% of the size of Warsaw. The Germans then closed off the Warsaw Ghetto from the outside world on November 16 of that year, building a wall around it. During the next year and a half, Jews from smaller cities and villages were brought into the Warsaw Ghetto, while diseases (especially typhoid) and starvation kept the inhabitants at about the same number. Average food rations in 1941 for Jews in Warsaw were limited to 253 kcal and 669 kcal for Poles as opposed to 2,613 kcal for Germans.

=== Deportations to death camps ===
On July 22, 1942, the mass deportation of the Warsaw Ghetto inhabitants began; during the next fifty-two days (until September 12, 1942) about 300,000 people were transported by train to the Treblinka extermination camp. The deportations were carried out by fifty German SS soldiers, 200 soldiers of the Latvian Schutzmannschaften Battalions, 200 Ukrainian Police, and 2,500 Jewish Ghetto Police. Employees of the Judenrat, including the Ghetto Police, along with their families and relatives, were given immunity from deportations in return for their cooperation. Additionally, in August 1942, Jewish ghetto policemen, under the threat of deportation themselves, were ordered to personally "deliver" five ghetto inhabitants to the Umschlagplatz train station. On January 18, 1943, some ghetto inhabitants, including members of ŻOB (Żydowska Organizacja Bojowa, Jewish Combat Organisation), resisted, often with arms, German attempts for additional deportations to Treblinka. The first ghetto uprising is believed to have occurred in 1942 the small town of Łachwa in the Polesie Voivodship (see Lakhva Ghetto). The final destruction of the Warsaw Ghetto came four months later after the crushing one of the most heroic and tragic battles of the war, Warsaw Ghetto Uprising, led by Mordechaj Anielewicz. Warsaw Ghetto Uprising, which was reverberated throughout Poland and the rest of the world as an example of courage and defiance, was followed by other failed ghetto uprisings in Nazi occupied Poland. Some of the survivors of Warsaw Ghetto Uprising, still held in camps at or near Warsaw were freed a year later during the larger 1944 Warsaw Uprising, led by Polish resistance movement Armia Krajowa and immediately joined Polish fighters. Only few of them survived. Polish commander of that Jewish unit, Wacław Micuta, described them as one of the best fighters of the Warsaw Uprising, always at the front line. It is estimated that over 2000 Polish Jews, some as well known as Marek Edelman or Icchak Cukierman, and several dozen Greek, Hungarian or even German Jews freed by Armia Krajowa from Gęsiówka concentration camp in Warsaw, men and woman, took part in combat against Nazis during 1944 Warsaw Uprising. As many as 17,000 Polish Jews died during 1944 Warsaw Uprising, who either fought with the AK units or had been discovered in hiding.

The fate of the Warsaw Ghetto was similar to that of the other ghettos in which Jews were concentrated. With the decision of Nazi Germany to begin the Final Solution, the destruction of the Jews of Europe, Operation Reinhard began in 1942, with the opening of the extermination camps of Bełżec, Sobibór, and Treblinka, followed by Auschwitz-Birkenau where people were executed to death in the gas chambers and massive executions (death wall). Many died from hunger, starvation, disease, torture or by pseudo-medical experiments. The mass deportation of Jews from ghettos to these camps, such as happened at the Warsaw Ghetto, soon followed, and more than 1.7 million Jews were killed at the Aktion Reinhard camps by October 1943 alone.

The Polish government-in-exile was the first (in November 1942) to reveal the existence of Nazi-run concentration camps and the systematic extermination of the Jews by the Nazis, through its courier Jan Karski and through the activities of Witold Pilecki, member of Armia Krajowa and the only person who volunteered for imprisonment in Auschwitz and organized a resistance movement inside the camp itself. One of the Jewish members of the National Council of the Polish government-in-exile, Szmul Zygielbojm, committed suicide to protest the indifference of the Allied governments in the face of the Holocaust in Poland. The Polish government in exile was also the only government to set up an organization (Żegota) specifically aimed at helping the Jews in Poland.

== Polish Jews in the Soviet Union ==
Thousands of Polish Jews migrated, were deported or later evacuated to Central or Eastern Soviet Union and many of them survived the Holocaust. Some of them died however because of hard conditions, Soviet repressions or in result of Ukraininian nationalist's violence. Two Bund leaders, Wiktor Alter and Henryk Ehrlich were executed in December 1941 in Moscow as alleged agents of Nazi Germany. Some Jews joined the Polish Communist Army (Józef Różański, Włodzimierz Brus) or Union of Polish Patriots (Julia Brystiger) and returned to Poland in 1944, others were allowed to leave the Soviet Union after the war or around 1956 (Lew Rywin).

=== Communist rule: 1945–1989 ===
Between 40,000 and 100,000 Polish Jews survived the Holocaust in Poland by hiding or by joining the Polish or Soviet partisan units. Another 50,000–170,000 were repatriated from the Soviet Union and 20,000–40,000 from Germany and other countries. At its postwar peak, there were 180,000–240,000 Jews in Poland settled mostly in Warsaw, Łódź, Kraków, Wrocław and Lower Silesia, e.g. Bielawa. Dzierżoniów.

Soon after the end of the Second World War, Jews began to exit Poland thanks to the repatriation agreement with the USSR. Poland was an Eastern Bloc country that allowed free Jewish aliyah to Mandate Palestine. The exodus took place in stages. After the war, the vast majority of survivors left for several reasons, often more than one. Many left simply because they did not want to live in a communist country. Some left because the refusal of the Communist regime to return prewar private property. Others did not wish to rebuild their lives in the places where their families were murdered. Yet others wanted to go to British Mandate of Palestine soon to become Israel. Some of the survivors had relatives abroad. The dominant factor, however, was the decision made by Gen. Spychalski of PWP to sign a decree allowing the remaining survivors to leave Poland without visas or exit permits. Poland was the only Eastern Bloc country to allow free Jewish aliyah upon the conclusion of World War II. Consequently, the Jewish emigration from Poland increased dramatically. Britain demanded from Poland (among others) to halt the Jewish exodus, but their pressure was largely unsuccessful. Jewish-Polish writer Rachela Auerbach, who visited Treblinka in November 1945 as part of an official delegation for the Main Commission for the Investigation of Hitlerite Crimes, found that some Polish peasants were digging up the ashes in search of overlooked valuables. Bełżec was similarly desecrated from 1943 onwards after the camp was closed, (see: Sonderaktion 1005 for the 1943 liquidation of the actual mass graves in both Treblinka and Belzec).

Postwar Poland was a chaotic country in which pro-Soviet communists and patriotic nationalists fought each other. Hundreds of Jews were murdered in anti-Jewish violence, including numerous functionaries of the new Stalinist regime. In the Kielce pogrom of 1946, thirty-seven Jews were brutally murdered. Until today the debate in Poland continues about the inferred evidence of the Soviet NKVD provocation and the presence of Russian soldiers in the killings. Between 1945 and 1948, 100,000–120,000 Jews left Poland. Their departure was largely organized by the Zionist activists in Poland such as Adolf Berman and Icchak Cukierman under the umbrella of a semi-clandestine, tolerated by the government of Poland, organization Berihah ("Flight"). Berman's brother Jakub supervised security forces, so he was one of the most influential people in Poland. Berihah was also responsible for the organized emigration of Jews from Romania, Hungary, Czechoslovakia, and Yugoslavia totaling 250,000 (including Poland) Holocaust survivors.

A second wave of Jewish emigration (50,000) took place during the liberalization of the Communist regime between 1957 and 1959. Then there was the third major wave of emigration, which one might call an expulsion of Jews, in 1968–1969. Thereafter almost all Jews who decided to stay in Poland "stopped" being Jewish.

The Bund took part in the post-war elections of 1947 on a common ticket with the (non-communist) Polish Socialist Party (PPS) and gained its first and only parliamentary seat in its Polish history, plus several seats in municipal councils. Under pressure from Soviet-installed Communist authorities, the Bund's leaders 'voluntarily' disbanded the party in 1948–1949 against the opposition of many activists.

==== The Stalinist period ====
For those Polish Jews who remained, the rebuilding of Jewish life in Poland was carried out between October 1944 and 1950 by the Central Committee of Polish Jews (Centralny Komitet Żydów Polskich, CKŻP) which provided legal, educational, social care, cultural, and propaganda services. A countrywide Jewish Religious Community, led by Dawid Kahane, who served as chief rabbi of the Polish Armed Forces, functioned between 1945 and 1948 until it was absorbed by the CKŻP. Eleven independent political Jewish parties, of which eight were legal, existed until their dissolution during 1949–50.

A number of Polish Jews participated in the establishment of the anti-revisionist socialist government in the People's Republic of Poland between 1944 and 1956, holding, among others, prominent posts in the Politburo of the Polish United Workers' Party (e.g. Jakub Berman, Hilary Minc – responsible for establishing a socialist economy), and the security service Urząd Bezpieczeństwa (UB) and in diplomacy/intelligence. After 1956, during the process of de-Stalinisation in Poland under Władysław Gomułka's regime, some Urząd Bezpieczeństwa officials including Roman Romkowski (born Natan Grunsapau-Kikiel), Józef (Jacek) Różański (born Jozef Goldberg), and Anatol Fejgin were prosecuted for "power abuses" including the torture of Polish anticommunists (among them, Witold Pilecki), and sentenced to long prison terms. A UB official, Józef Światło, (born Izaak Fleichfarb), after escaping in 1953 to the West, exposed through Radio Free Europe the methods of the UB which led to its dissolution in 1954. Jerzy Borejsza was an important press and book editor, who attracted many talented writers.

Some Jewish cultural institutions were established including the Yiddish State Theater founded in 1950 and directed by Ida Kamińska, the Jewish Historical Institute, an academic institution specializing in the research of the history and culture of the Jews in Poland, and the Yiddish newspaper Folks-Shtime.

=== From 1967 to 1989 ===
In 1967, following the Six-Day War between Israel and the Arab states, communist Poland broke off diplomatic relations with Israel. The Israeli victory over the Soviet backed Arab states in 1967 was greeted by Poles with glee; "Our Jews have given the Soviet Arabs a drumming!" By 1968 most of Poland's 40,000 remaining Jews were assimilated into Polish society, but over the next year they became the center of a Soviet backed, centrally organized campaign, equating Jewish origins with Zionist sympathies and thus disloyalty to Poland.

In March 1968 student-led demonstrations in Warsaw (Polish 1968 political crisis) gave Gomułka's government an excuse to channel public anti-government sentiment into another avenue. Thus his security chief, Mieczysław Moczar, used the situation as a pretext to launch an anti-Semitic press campaign (although the expression "Zionist" was officially used). The state-sponsored "anti-Zionist" campaign resulted in the removal of Jews from the Polish United Workers' Party and from teaching positions in schools and universities. Due to economic, political and police pressure, 25,000 Jews were forced to emigrate during 1968–1970. The campaign, though ostensibly directed at Jews who had held office in the Stalinist era and at their families, affected most of the remaining Polish Jews, whatever their backgrounds.

There were several outcomes of the March 1968 events. The propaganda campaign coupled with ORMO attack on universities, damaged Poland's reputation abroad, particularly in the U.S. Many Polish intellectuals were disgusted at the promotion of official anti-Semitism, and opposed the campaign. Some of the people who emigrated to the West thereafter, founded organizations which encouraged anticommunist opposition inside Poland.

During the late 1970s some Jewish activists were engaged in the anticommunist opposition groups. Most prominent among them, Adam Michnik (founder of Gazeta Wyborcza) was one of the founders of the Workers' Defence Committee (KOR). By the time of the fall of Communism in Poland in 1989, only 5,000–10,000 Jews remained in the country, many of them preferring to conceal their Jewish origin.

== See also ==
- History of the Jews in Poland
  - History of the Jews in Poland before the 18th century
  - History of the Jews in 18th-century Poland
  - History of the Jews in 19th-century Poland
  - History of the Jews in 20th-century Poland
  - Jewish–Polish history (1989–present)
  - Timeline of Jewish-Polish history
