= Stanisław Radkiewicz =

Polish communist official (1903–1987)

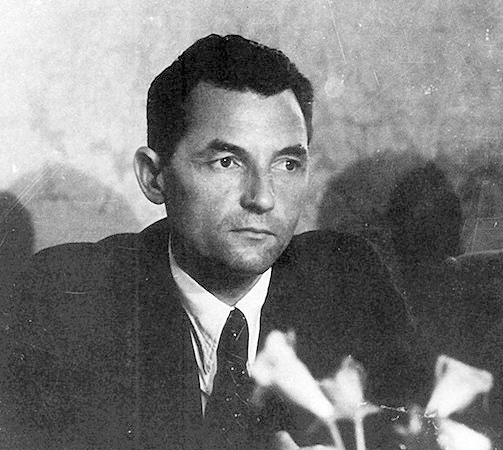
- Radkiewicz in 1946

Minister of Public Security
- In office 22 July 1944 – 7 December 1954
- Preceded by: Position established
- Succeeded by: Position abolished

Minister of State Agricultural Farms
- In office 7 December 1954 – 19 April 1956
- Prime Minister: Józef Cyrankiewicz
- Preceded by: Hilary Chełchowski
- Succeeded by: Mieczysław Moczar

Personal details
- Born: 19 January 1903 Slonimsky Uyezd, Grodno Governorate, Russian Empire
- Died: 13 November 1987 (aged 84) Warsaw, Polish People's Republic
- Party: Polish United Workers' Party (1948–1957)
- Other political affiliations: Communist Party of Poland (1925–1938); Polish Workers' Party (1942–1948)
- Education: Communist University of the National Minorities of the West
- Awards: Order of the Cross of Grunwald; Order of the Banner of Labour; Order of Polonia Restituta; Medal for Warsaw

Military service
- Allegiance: Soviet Union (1943–1944); Polish People's Republic (1944–1954)
- Branch/service: Red Army; Polish People's Army; Ministry of Public Security
- Rank: Major general
- Battles/wars: World War II; Anti-communist resistance in Poland (1944–1953)

Stanisław Radkiewicz (Polish pronunciation: [staˈɲiswaf ratˈkʲevit͡ʂ]; 19 January 1903 – 13 December 1987) was a Polish communist activist with Soviet citizenship, a member of the pre-war Communist Party of Poland and of the post-war Polish United Workers' Party (PZPR). As head of the Ministry of Public Security of Poland (Urząd Bezpieczeństwa or UB) between 1944 and 1954, he was one of the chief organisers of Stalinist terror in Poland. He also served as a political commissar and was made a divisional general in Communist Poland.

Unlike other individuals responsible for the Stalinist terror in the 1940s and 1950s, Radkiewicz was never held responsible for his crimes, although in 1956, after the Poznań protests and his official "self-critique", he was removed from his post as Minister of Public Security and made Minister of State Agricultural Farms (PGRs).

== Early life ==
Radkiewicz was born in the village of Rozmierki in the Slonimsky Uyezd of the Grodno Governorate of the Russian Empire (present-day Belarus). He was the son of farmer Franciszek and Paulina née Lenczewska. He finished third grade. In 1915, during World War I, together with his family he was evacuated by the retreating Imperial Russian Army to Buzuluk in the Samara Governorate, where he worked on local farms. After the Bolshevik Revolution, he joined the Komsomol.

After the Polish-Soviet War, in 1922, his family moved back to their home village, but Stanisław soon moved to the Soviet Union where he worked in the Polish Bureau of the Communist Party of Byelorussia. In 1925, he was sent clandestinely by Moscow back into Poland to take charge of the youth section of the illegal Polish Communist Party (KPP). Three years later, he was arrested for activity against the sovereignty and independence of the Polish Republic and sentenced to four years in prison.

After being released, he served as a functionary of the KPP. He was arrested again in 1937 and served half a year in prison. In 1938, on the orders of Joseph Stalin, the KPP was disbanded and many of its leaders were executed as part of the Great Purge. Radkiewicz, however, was spared as he enjoyed Stalin's confidence and was in fact put in charge by Stalin of liquidating KPP's party cells.

== World War II ==
During World War II, he volunteered for the Red Army, but was later transferred and made a political commissar of the Polish 1st Tadeusz Kościuszko Infantry Division and later a division general. He was also a delegate to the first Polish Sejm under Communist rule.

== Head of secret police ==
Radkiewicz was made head of the UB secret police in 1944, shortly after the formation of the Polish Committee of National Liberation (PKWN) "Lublin Committee" explicitly with Stalin's approval.

On 31 December 1944, the PKWN was transformed into the Provisional Government of the Republic of Poland and the UB was renamed Ministry of Public Security of Poland (MBP), although it continued to be known by its UB acronym partly because local offices continued under the old name. In the period after 1945, the secret police grew rapidly under Radkiewicz's direction, with twelve thousand agents in April 1945 and twenty-four thousand in December 1945. At its height, in 1953, the organisation had thirty-three thousand agents.

Radkiewicz's UB focused its activities on several main areas:

- agitation and armed terror, including secret murders, directed at the only legal political opposition to the Communists, the Polish People's Party (also known as "Polish Peasant Party", PSL) (which was forced to merge into the Communist controlled satellite United People's Party (ZSL) in 1949)
- tracking down, arresting and executing members of the anti-communist underground organisations, such as Freedom and Independence (WiN), National Armed Forces (NSZ) or other "Cursed soldiers" and non-violent civilian organisations.
- attacking and suppressing the activity of the Catholic Church in Poland, as well as other, non-Catholic, religious organisations.

Additionally, the UB played a significant role in organising Operation Vistula, and in consolidating Communist control of the Polish education system.

== Action against the Polish People's Party ==
In December 1945, Radkiewicz directed a general action against the only legal opposition party in Poland at the time, the PSL. The purpose of the action was to ensure a Communist victory in the upcoming elections and in the Polish people's referendum of 1946. On Radkiewicz's orders, PSL candidates in the elections were harassed and removed from electoral lists, ballots sent to areas of high PSL support were intercepted and never delivered so that voting never took place, PSL town hall meetings were attacked by units of Milicja Obywatelska (MO) and UB and, finally, particularly active members of the party were murdered. Radkiewicz issued an order to his agents in which he instructed them to prepare an action of "liquidating" members of the PSL which, according to him, opposed Communist rule in Poland and which supposedly supported the anti-Communist underground. The order also stated that these liquidations were to be made to look as the work of the anti-Communist underground, combined with a press campaign directed against "anti-government terrorist bandits", which would place the blame for the murders on various anti-Communist organisations. As a result, between the spring of 1945 and January 1947, at least 140 members of the PSL were murdered by the UB, among them notable figures such as Narcyz Wiatr and Władysław Kojder. The leader of the PSL, Stanisław Mikołajczyk, in the face of widespread election fraud and growing state terror against his party, fled Poland in April 1946.

== Action against the Catholic Church in Poland ==
As early as September 1945, Radkiewicz ordered the organisation of the 5th Department of UB whose task was to "counter organisations and groups active against the interests of the (Communist) Party". Within the 5th Department, Section V was charged with investigating and building actions against the Catholic Church. Within the section, Sub-Section I was charged with investigating those active in the Catholic Church (including the clergy) while Sub-Section II's focus was to be on the Catholic press and secular Catholic organisations.

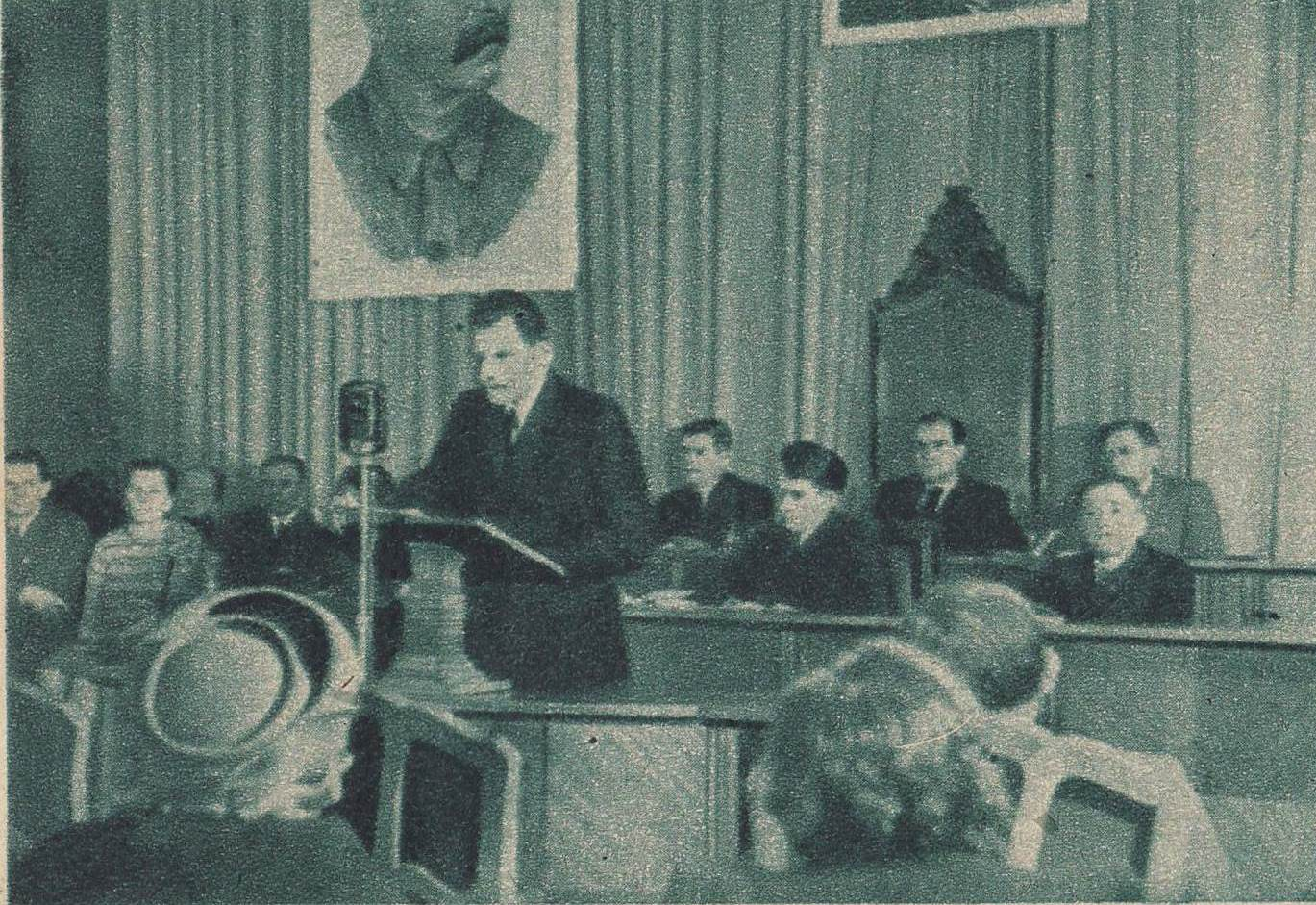
Radkiewicz giving a speech in 1948

The head of the 5th Department was Julia Brystiger who, together with Radkiewicz, organized the secret police's operations aimed at the Catholic Church in Poland. In October 1947, Brystiger - who was an interrogator of political prisoners widely known for her sadism and Gestapo-like methods of torture during questioning – presented a seminar entitled On the Clergy's Offensive Against Our Task at a conference for secret police chiefs and Radkiewicz was the main discussant. In her presentation, Brystiger stated that the "final time of merciless fight with the Church" was coming soon and that, in order to win it, the secret services of the Polish United Workers' Party would need to employ "any means necessary". Radkiewicz, in his follow up remarks, noted that, "The clergy is not like the PSL (The Polish People's Party). With them it won't be as easy as it was with the PSL". As a result, in the autumn of 1950 Radkiewicz split Section V of the 5th Department into its own department (also the 5th) whose purpose was exclusively the "fight against the clergy".

The actions against the Catholic Church took several forms, including harassment of priests and nuns, attempts to alienate the Polish church from the Vatican via the use of moles and agent provocateurs, seizure and expropriation of church property, and staging of incidents which were meant to embarrass the Catholic hierarchy in the eyes of the public and Western opinion (for example, planting of weapons in churches). In particularly "difficult" cases of politically active priests and Catholics who "didn't get the message", Radkiewicz ordered their elimination from public life, or, if all else failed, murder.

== Party membership ==
In December 1954, Radkiewicz was removed from the position of Minister of Security, and in July 1955 he stepped down from the Political Bureau of the PZPR. After workers' unrest in Poznan in 1956 and the Polish October reforms, several other members of the security services responsible for the Stalinist terror in Poland were put on trial (among others Roman Romkowski, Józef Różański and Anatol Fejgin), but Radkiewicz went unpunished. After he made a public critique of his actions, he was made the Minister of State Farms. In May 1957, he was removed from the Central Committee of the PZPR and, for three years, from the Party itself. From 1960 until 1968, he served as the general director of the Bureau of State Reserves and retired in 1968. He died on 13 December 1987, aged 84, in Warsaw. Over the years, he had been awarded the Order of the Cross of Grunwald and the Order of the Banner of Labour (Order Sztandaru Pracy).

== Awards and decorations ==
- Order of the Banner of Labour, 1st Class
- Commander's Cross with Star of Order of Polonia Restituta
- Order of the Cross of Grunwald, 2nd Class
- Medal "For participation in the fights in defense of the people's power"
- Medal for Warsaw 1939–1945
- Order of Merits for the People with Golden Star (Yugoslavia)
- Order of the Star of the Romanian People's Republic (Romania)
