= Roman Romkowski =

Polish communist official

- Roman Romkowski

Personal details
- Born: Menasche Grünspan; February 16, 1907 Kraków, Austria-Hungary
- Died: July 1, 1968 (aged 61) Warsaw, Poland
- Citizenship: Polish
- Occupation: Vice-minister, security agent
- Nickname: Nasiek (Natan) Grinszpan-Kikiel

Military service
- Allegiance: State Security Services (Urząd Bezpieczeństwa)
- Rank: Brigadier general of public security

Roman Romkowski born Menasche Grünspan also known as Nasiek (Natan) Grinszpan-Kikiel, (February 16, 1907 – July 12, 1968) was a Polish communist official trained by Comintern in Moscow. After the Soviet takeover of Poland Romkowski settled in Warsaw and became second in command (the deputy minister) in the Ministry of Public Security (MBP or colloquially UB) during the late 1940s and early 1950s. Along with several other high functionaries including Stanisław Radkiewicz, Anatol Fejgin, Józef Różański, Julia Brystiger and the chief supervisor of Polish State Security Services, Minister Jakub Berman from the Politburo, Romkowski came to symbolize communist terror in postwar Poland. He was responsible for the work of departments: Counter-espionage (1st), Espionage (7th), Security in the PPR–PZPR (10th Dept. run by Fejgin), and others.

De-Stalinization brought about Romkowski's downfall. He was arrested in 1956 and sentenced to prison for gross violations of human rights and abuse of power.

== Early life ==
Romkowski was born on February 16, 1907, into a Jewish family in Kraków, as the fourth child of Stanisław (originally Izaak) and Maria (originally Amalia) née Blajwajs (Bleiweis). His father was a butcher by profession, employed at a sausage factory. His mother worked intermittently as a cook and a maid at a public bathhouse. He had seven siblings.

Romkowski began his political activities by joining the youth section of the Woodworkers' Trade Union and later the Poale Zion, which at that time had significant influence among the workers in that union. The progressive radicalization of his views led him to join the Young Communist League of Poland (ZMKwP), established on March 17, 1922. His initial tasks included conducting communist agitation in the youth sections of trade unions and performing tasks within the so-called "technique," which involved, among other things, distributing leaflets and illegal publications, organizing meetings, and hiding communist activists sought by the police. In 1924, Romkowski became the head of the "technique," which also meant joining the District Committee of the Union of Communist Youth in Kraków.

During preparations for the first anniversary of the Kraków riot in November 1923 (the so-called Kraków Uprising), Romkowski was arrested for the first time for his activities. On March 5, 1925, the court sentenced him to three years of imprisonment at hard labor. He initially served his sentence at St. Michael's Prison on Senacka Street in Kraków, then was transferred to Bastion III "Kleparz" of the Kraków Fortress on Kamienna Street. As he claimed, he actively participated in the life of the prison commune during this time, including leading hunger strikes and catching up on Marxism-Leninism studies. In September 1926, he was released early under an amnesty for minors.

After regaining freedom in 1926, Romkowski returned to work in the Young Communist League of Poland in Kraków under the pseudonym "Stanek". He quickly rose to leadership positions in the ZMK and joined the Communist Party of Poland (KPP). In 1927–1928, he was arrested multiple times for communist activities but released after short detentions.

In 1929, Romkowski began working as a paid party functionary, liaising between regional KPP committees. His activities drew police attention, leading to further arrests and restrictions on his movements.

In 1930, he represented the Kraków district at the 5th KPP Congress in Petergof. Later that year, he was sent to Moscow to study at the Communist University of the National Minorities of the West, where he adopted the name "Roman Stanislavovich Romkowski". He completed his studies in 1934 and attended additional political and military training courses before returning to Poland in 1935.

== Work in security services ==
From 1941, he fought in the Soviet partisan unit 'Stalin Brigade' in Belarus, serving as a unit commander, political commissar, and head of intelligence for the Brigade. After the formation of the Polish Committee of National Liberation in July 1944, Romkowski was assigned to help establish Poland's new security apparatus. On August 1, 1944, he became head of the Operational (Counterintelligence) Department of the Public Security Resort in Lublin.

From 1944 to 1948, he was a member of the Polish Workers' Party (PPR) – from December 12, 1945, to December 21, 1948, he was a member of the Central Committee (KC), and subsequently of the Polish United Workers' Party (PZPR) – from December 21, 1948, to January 24, 1955, he was also a member of the Central Committee of the Polish United Workers' Party. He was a delegate to the I and II Congress of the PPR and the I and II Congress of the PZPR. Romkowski played a key role in organizing the security apparatus, creating its first operational guidelines and training its officers. He drafted important instructions on investigative procedures and managing informant networks.

On January 1, 1945, Romkowski was appointed director of Department I (Counterintelligence) in the new Ministry of Public Security. Initially, he oversaw most of the ministry's operational work. On January 15, 1946, he was promoted to Assistant Minister of Public Security for operational work, coordinating and directing key departments including counterintelligence, operational technology, economic protection, and the fight against the independence underground. Romkowski focused on developing methods for managing informant networks to combat the anti-communist underground and political opposition. He oversaw major operations against resistance groups.

In later years, Romkowski applied his methods of managing informant networks to combat various "enemies of the people's government", including the Catholic Church and alleged economic saboteurs. He played a key role in organizing two amnesties in 1945 and 1947, which were considered successful in weakening the anti-communist underground.

In 1947, he interrogated Captain Witold Pilecki in the X Pavilion of the Mokotów Prison (Romkowski's handwritten notes can be found on the interrogation protocols). In 1948, Romkowski was tasked with overseeing the internal party purge against the "right-nationalist deviation" (Gomułka faction). He was promoted to Deputy Minister of Public Security in 1949 and joined the Politburo's Commission for Public Security. In 1949, he was appointed Brigadier General of Public Security. From the same year, he served as Undersecretary of State in the Ministry of Public Security. From February 24, 1949, to 1954, he was a member of the Security Commission of the Central Committee of the Polish United Workers' Party (KC PZPR), which supervised the apparatus of Stalinist repression in Poland.

Romkowski directly supervised investigations and interrogations of suspected party members, including the arrest and questioning of Władysław Gomułka in 1951-1952. His career began to unravel in late 1953 after the defection of his close associate Józef Światło to the West Germany. Światło's revelations about the regime's inner workings in 1954 led to Romkowski's downfall and the restructuring of the security apparatus.

== Arrest ==
Romkowski was arrested on April 23, 1956, during the Polish October, and brought to trial along with functionaries responsible for gross violations of human rights law and their abuse of power. Historian Heather Laskey alleges that it was probably not a coincidence that the high ranking Stalinist security officers put on trial by Gomułka were Jews. Władysław Gomułka was captured by Światło and imprisoned by Romkowski in 1951 on Soviet orders, and interrogated by both, him and Fejgin. Gomułka escaped physical torture only as a close associate of Joseph Stalin, and was released three years later.

== The court proceedings ==
At trial, Col. Różański didn't deny that he routinely tortured prisoners including Polish United Workers' Party members, and he didn't apologize for his actions. Instead, he pointed a finger at Romkowski and continuously repeated the Leninist argument that "the end justifies the means". For him, torturing people was a daily double-shift job, nothing more, nothing less. He admitted that all charges against his victims were falsified on site by his department.

Roman Romkowski had been put on trial along with Józef Różański and a second Jewish defendant from his department, Anatol Fejgin. Romkowski insisted that Różański should have been removed already in 1949 for his destructive activities, even though, Romkowski himself taught Różański everything about torture. Both, Romkowski and Różański, were sentenced to 15 years in prison on 11 November 1957, for unlawful imprisonment and mistreatment of innocent detainees. Romkowski was pardoned and released from prison on 1 October 1964. Feign was sentenced to 12 years, on similar charges.

A well-known writer Kazimierz Moczarski from AK, interrogated by Romkowski's subordinates from January 9, 1949, till June 6, 1951, described 49 different types of torture he endured. Beatings included truncheon blows to bridge of nose, salivary glands, chin, shoulder blades, bare feet and toes (particularly painful), heels (ten blows each foot, several times a day), cigarette burns on lips and eyelids and burning of fingers. Sleep deprivation, resulting in near-madness – meant standing upright in a narrow cell for seven to nine days with frequent blows to the face – a hallucinatory method called by the interrogators "Zakopane". General Romkowski told him on November 30, 1948, that he personally requested this "sheer hell".

The court announced that the actions of Roman Romkowski and his Ministry demoralised the Party as much as its own functionaries. Jakub Berman, the chief supervisor of State Security Services incriminated by Józef Światło who defected to the West, resigned from his Politburo post in May and was evaluated by the 20th Congress, which launched a process of partial democratisation of Polish political as well as economic life. The number of security agents at the ministry was cut by 22%, and 9,000 socialist and populist politicians were released from prison on top of some 34,644 detainees across the country. "The routing of the Polish Stalinists was indeed complete."

== Awards and decorations ==
- Order of the Banner of Labour (18 JUly 1954)
- Order of the Cross of Grunwald, 2nd Class (19 July 1946)
- Commander's Cross of Order of Polonia Restituta (22 July 1947)
- Officer's Cross of Order of Polonia Restituta (10 October 1945)
- Order of the Red Banner, twice (USSR)
- Order of the Red Star (USSR)

== See also ==
- History of Polish intelligence services
