= Antoni Wąsik =

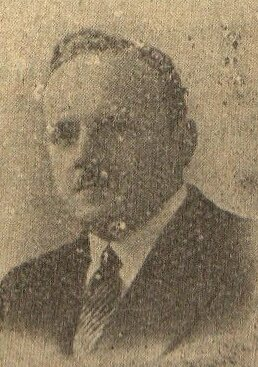
- Born: 24 February 1886; Warsaw, Congress Poland
- Died: 19 May 1956 (aged 70)
- Occupations: Socialist and trade union activist
- Awards: Medal of Independence

Antoni Wąsik (born 24 February 1886 in Warsaw, died 19 May 1956) was a Polish socialist and trade union activist, Siberian exile, and pro-Stalin prisoner. He was the father of Stanisław Wąsik, an activist of the Polish Socialist Party in exile.

== Biography ==
He was born on 24 February 1886 in Warsaw, to the family of Teodor and Teofila née Waśkiewicz. From 1904, he was a member of the Polish Socialist Party. In 1905, as a student, he organized a school strike at the Praga Gymnasium in Warsaw. He was sentenced to exile in Siberia, where he stayed from 1907 to 1911. He passed his matriculation exam in Tobolsk. From 1911, he worked in Odessa, including as the secretary of the Council of Representatives of the Industry and Trade of Southern Russia, and later as the vice-chairman of the State Defense Council for the Odessa district. During World War I, he was active in the Polish Socialist Party – Left in Odessa. He participated in the February Revolution of 1917 and was elected a member of the Odesa City Council. He returned to Poland in February 1923. In the interwar period, he was an activist of the Polish Socialist Party, a member of the district committee in Praga, and after 1928, a member and vice-chairman of the district workers' committee in Warsaw. He was a member of the PPS Central Council from 1928 to 1934 and again from 1937.

As a trade union activist, he served as the general secretary of the Union of Workers in the Food Industry in Poland, and from 1929 to 1937, simultaneously as the chairman of the union. From 1929 to 1939, he was a member of the Executive Department of the Central Commission of Trade Unions. In 1938, he was a member of the supervisory board of the Warsaw Housing Cooperative. From 1939 to 1945, he was a member of the Polish Socialist Party – Freedom, Equality, Independence, heading the Committee on Trade Unions. From 1945, he collaborated with Kazimierz Pużak. On July 6, 1946, he was arrested on charges of collaborating with armed units of Marian Bernaciak "Orlik". Deputy Minister of Security Henryk Wachowicz (a member of the "Lublin" PPS) released Wąsik from prison in the absence of Minister Stanisław Radkiewicz. After a few hours, Stanisław Radkiewicz overturned this decision and re-arrested Wąsik. In October 1946, Wąsik was sentenced by the Supreme Military Court to 6 years in prison. In April 1948, on the orders of Gen. Roman Romkowski and Col. Józef Różański, he was released from prison "due to poor health".

He died on 19 May 1956. He is buried at the Bródno Cemetery (section 112H-2-24).

== Awards ==
- Medal of Independence (16 March 1937)
