= Wiatr =

Wiatr is a surname. Notable people with the surname include:

- Jerzy Wiatr (born 1931), Polish politician, sociologist, and political scientist
- Kazimierz Wiatr (born 1955), Polish politician
- Narcyz Wiatr (1907–1945), Polish political activist
