= Nikolai Vlasik =

Soviet general (1896–1967)

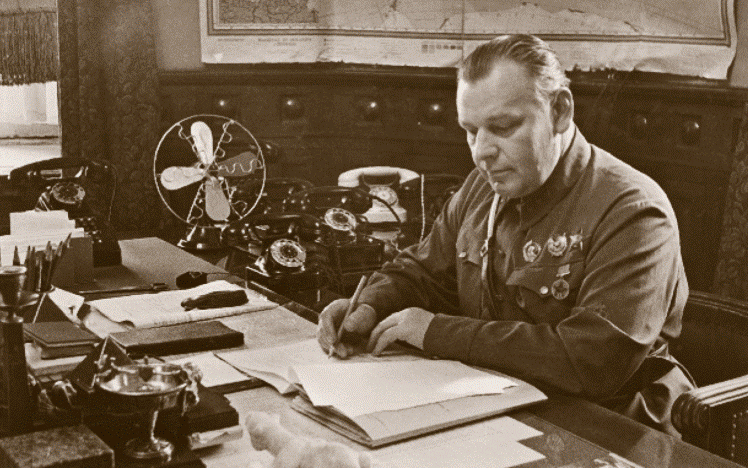
- Nikolai Vlasik in his office in the late 1930s
- Native name: Никола́й Си́дорович Вла́сик
- Birth name: Nikolai Sidorovich Vlasik
- Born: 22 May 1896 Slonimsky Uyezd, Grodno Governorate, Russian Empire
- Died: 18 June 1967 (aged 71) Moscow, Soviet Union
- Awards: Cross of St. George; Orders of Lenin; Order of the Red Banner; Order of the Red Star; Order of Kutuzov; Jubilee Medal "XX Years of the Workers' and Peasants' Red Army"; Honoured Worker of the Cheka-GPU
- Children: 1

Nikolai Sidorovich Vlasik (Russian: Никола́й Си́дорович Вла́сик; 22 May 1896 – 18 June 1967) was a ranking Soviet state security (NKVD-NKGB-MGB) officer, best known as head of Joseph Stalin's personal security from 1931 to 1952.

== Early life ==
Nikolai Vlasik was born to a poor peasant family in the village of Bobynichi in the Slonimsky Uyezd of the Grodno Governorate (the present-day Grodno Region in Belarus) of the Russian Empire on 22 May 1896.

Drafted into the Russian Army in March 1915, he earned the Cross of St. George during World War I, and by the time of the October Revolution in November 1917 had the rank of corporal.

In November 1917 he began serving in the Moscow militia. In September 1919 he transferred to the Cheka. By January 1926 he had become the senior representative of the Operative branch of OGPU. Furthermore, Vlasik held supervising posts in the operations section, which included the protection of the heads of the party and government.

For many years, Vlasik served as chief of Stalin's personal protective service in the Kremlin, beginning in 1931 (this service was subordinated directly to Stalin and independent of the secret police, the NKVD). He also became, in essence, a member of Stalin's family. After the death of Stalin's wife, Nadezhda Alliluyeva in 1932, he also functioned as the tutor of Stalin's children. In particular, he was a father figure to Vasily.

== Arrest ==
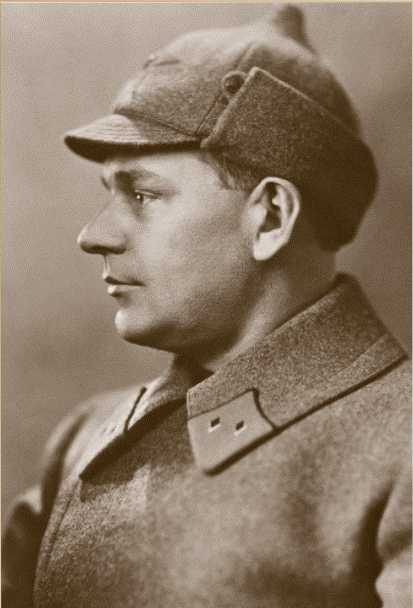
Vlasik in the 1920s

On 15 December 1952, Vlasik was removed from his position and soon arrested on charges related to the Doctors' plot. After Stalin's death, all of the accused doctors were released and charges against them dropped. However, Vlasik was not released and the charges against him were changed to abuse of power and embezzlement. In 1955, he was stripped of his lieutenant general's rank and all decorations and exiled for ten years to Krasnoyarsk. In accordance with an earlier amnesty of 1953, his sentence was reduced to five years. In 1956, Vlasik was pardoned but his rank was not restored. In 2000, 33 years after his death, his sentence was annulled and he was completely exonerated.

In his memoirs Vlasik wrote, "I was severely hurt by Stalin. For 25 years of doing an irreproachable job, receiving nothing but encouragement and awards, I was excluded from the Party and flung into prison. For my boundless fidelity he gave me into the charge of my enemies. But never, for any minute of the condition I was in, to whatever mockeries I was exposed while in prison, had I in my soul any malice against Stalin".

== Awards ==
- Cross of St. George, 4th class
- Three Orders of Lenin (26 April 1940, 21 February 1945, 16 September 1945)
- Order of the Red Banner, four times (28 August 1937, 20 September 1943, 3 November 1944)
- Order of the Red Star (14 May 1936)
- Order of Kutuzov, 1st class (24 February 1945)
- Jubilee Medal "XX Years of the Workers' and Peasants' Red Army" (22 February 1938)
- Honoured Worker of the Cheka-GPU, twice (20/12/1932, 16/12/1935)
