= Julia Brystiger =

Polish communist activist (1902–1975)

- Julia Brystiger
- Born: Julia Prajs; 25 November 1902; Stryj, Austria-Hungary
- Died: 9 November 1975 (aged 72); Warsaw, Poland
- Other name: Luna Brystygier
- Citizenship: Polish
- Occupations: Interrogator, writer
- Known for: State Security Services (Urząd Bezpieczeństwa)

Julia Brystiger (Note: also spelled Brystygier, Bristiger, Brustiger, Briestiger, Brystygierowa, Bristigierowa) (Polish: [ˈjulja brɨsˈtiɡɛr]; née Prajs; 25 November 1902 – 9 October 1975) was a Polish communist activist and member of the security apparatus in socialist Poland. She was nicknamed Bloody Luna in reference to her purportedly brutal interrogation methods. Her pen name was Julia Preiss. She was the author of several books.

== Life ==
Brystiger was the daughter of a Jewish pharmacist from Stryj (now Ukraine). In 1920, she graduated from high school in Lwów (new Second Polish Republic) and married a Zionist activist Natan (Nathan) Brystiger (1890-1932). She studied history at the Lwów University while pregnant and a year later gave birth to a son, Michał Brystiger (1921–2016), a musicologist.

After graduating from University, Brystiger went to Paris where she continued her education, receiving a PhD in philosophy. Upon their return, in 1928–1929, she got a job at a high school in Vilnius and in a Jewish Teacher's College Tarbuch. Since 1927, she was an active participant in the communist movement, and in 1929 was fired because of her communist agitation. Working for the Communist Party of Poland, she was arrested several times, and in 1937 was sentenced to 2 years in prison.

=== UB career ===
Following Operation Barbarossa, Brystiger fled to Kharkov, then to Samarkand. There, she created the Committee of Political Prisoners, which helped the NKVD to imprison several members of the prewar Polish opposition movements. Her frequent denunciations in Samarkand antagonized even fellow Communist Party members. Allegedly, she oversaw the interrogation of Bela and Józef Goldberg for accepting food aid from the Polish Government in Exile's embassy; Goldberg later became her colleague in the UB as Józef Różański.

In 1943-44, she worked for the Union of Polish Patriots, and in October 1944, joined the new Polish Workers' Party. In December 1944, after returning behind the Soviet front, Brystiger began working for the Ministry of Public Security of Poland, where she soon was promoted to the rank of Director of the Fifth Department, created in July 1946 specifically for the purpose of persecution and torture of Polish religious personalities. Her career is believed to have been so rapid also because she was intimate with such high functionaries as Jakub Berman and Hilary Minc. In the Polish official archives, there is an instruction written by Brystygier to her subordinates, about the purpose of torture:

In fact, the Polish intelligentsia as such is against the Communist system and basically, it is impossible to re-educate it. All that remains is to liquidate it. However, since we must not repeat the mistake of the Russians after the 1917 revolution, when all intelligentsia members were exterminated, and the country did not develop correctly afterwards, we have to create such a system of terror and pressure that the members of the intelligentsia would not dare to be politically active.

Brystiger personally oversaw the first stages of each UB investigation at her place of employment. Allegedly, she was a zealous torturer with a fixation on the torture of detainees' genitals. She directed the operation to arrest and detain the Primate of Poland, Cardinal Stefan Wyszyński. The decision to arrest him had been made earlier in Moscow. Brystygier took an active part in the "war against religion" in the 1950s, during which 123 Roman Catholic priests were imprisoned in 1950 alone.

She also persecuted other congregations, such as the 2,000 jailed Jehovah's Witnesses. Julia Brystygier left the Ministry of Public Security (UB) in 1956 and tried to become a writer, authoring a novel "Crooked Letters". She worked in a publishing house under Jerzy Borejsza (Różański's brother), and was a frequent visitor to a boarding school for the visually impaired, in a village near Warsaw.

== Works ==
- Krzywe litery (1960)
- Znak "H" : opowiadania (1962)
- Przez ucho igielne (1965)

== See also ==
- History of Poland: Stalinist era (1948–1956)
