= Narcyz Wiatr =

Polish politician (1907–1945)

Narcyz Wiatr (nom-de-guerre "Zawoja" and "Władysław Brzoza"; 19 September 1907 – 21 April 1945) was a Polish political activist, member of the agrarian Polish People's Party (SL), a prisoner at the Bereza Kartuska prison and during World War II a leader of Peasants' Battalions (BCh) an anti-Nazi underground resistance movement, with the rank of colonel.

== Biography ==
Wiatr was born on 19 September 1907 in Stróże. Before the war Wiatr studied Law and Economics at Adam Mickiewicz University in Poznań, where he became active in youth organizations associated with the Ludowcy (agrarian) movement. Between 1937 and 1939 he was the chief of the SL in Nowy Sącz. He helped to organize a farmer's strike in the Beskidy region, for which he was arrested and imprisoned at Bereza Kartuska for six weeks, along with other political activists.

He was one of the commanders of the organization "Chłostra" (an acronym of Chłopska Straż – Peasants' Guard).

From 1941 until 1945 he was the commander of the VI Region of the BCh in Małopolska and Silesia, and was active in the organization SL-Roch (the wartime successor of People's Party). After the merger between BCh and the Polish Home Army (AK) (within which, BCh retained its own officers and command structure) he was the second in command of the Kraków Region of the AK.

After the formation of the communist Polish Committee of National Liberation "Lublin Committee" and the subsequent political takeover of Poland by the communists, Wiatr issued an order to members of his organization (order No. 186) in which he recommended against SL and BCh members joining the structures of the new communist authorities. Because of the persecution directed at the former members of the anti-Nazi underground by the communist authorities, Narcyz decided to stay partially underground and did not "reveal" himself to the local secret police office.

Narcyz Wiatr was murdered on 21 April 1945 in Planty Park in Kraków, by members of the Myślenice communist secret police (UB), most likely on the orders of UB chief Stanisław Radkiewicz. At the time it was claimed that Wiatr had been killed by "unknown perpetrators". and no investigation into his murder was conducted.

In 1990 the Kraków office of the Institute of National Remembrance, charged with investigating historical crimes by Nazis and communists in Poland, began an official investigation into his death. In 1996, Stanisław Paryła, who had been an agent of the Kraków communist secret police in 1945 and participated in the shooting during which Wiatr was killed, was charged with murder. Because of the ill health of the accused, the trial was postponed.
