= Jakub Berman =

Polish politician (1901–1984)

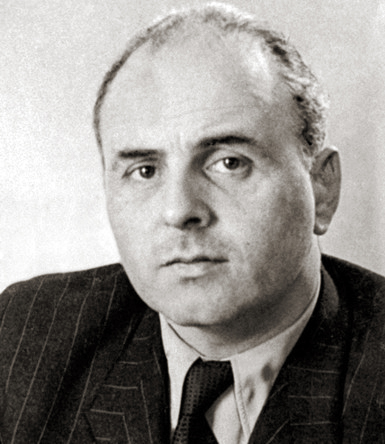

Deputy Prime Minister of Poland
- In office 18 March 1954 – 4 May 1956

Personal details
- Born: 23 December 1901 Warsaw, Congress Poland, Russian Empire
- Died: 10 April 1984 (aged 82) Warsaw, Polish People's Republic
- Resting place: Powązki Military Cemetery, Warsaw
- Party: Polish United Workers' Party
- Spouse: Gustawa Berman
- Children: 1
- Profession: Lawyer
- De facto leader of the PPR: ← (First in role); Bierut (1948) →

Jakub Berman (23 December 1901 – 10 April 1984) was a Polish communist politician. An activist during the Second Polish Republic, in post-war communist Poland he was a member of the Politburo of the Polish Workers' Party (PPR) and then of the Polish United Workers' Party (PZPR). From 1948, he was considered the second most powerful politician in Poland after President Bolesław Bierut, until he was removed from power in 1956, following Bierut's death.

Alongside Bierut, Berman was responsible for party oversight of the Stalinist Ministry of Public Security, commonly known as the "UB". Under Berman's leadership, 200,000 people were imprisoned for alleged political crimes, and 6,000 were executed.

== Early career ==
Jakub Berman was born into a middle-class Jewish family in Warsaw on 23 December 1901. His younger brother was Adolf Berman. Jakub became a member of the Communist Youth Union and in 1928 joined the Communist Party of Poland (KPP). He was arrested a few times, but unlike many other activists, had not been imprisoned for a prolonged period. He received a law degree in 1925 from the University of Warsaw. He wrote a magister thesis entitled Służba domowa w Warszawie w końcu w. XVIII oraz próby jej zrzeszenia się zawodowego ('Domestic servantry in Warsaw at the end of the 18th century and its attempts to establish a trade association'). Berman's academic adviser, Marxist sociologist Prof. Ludwik Krzywicki, wanted to hire Berman at the university as his assistant, but this was not allowed because of Berman's Jewish origin. Krzywicki's efforts to find Berman a mainstream non-university job also failed and Berman ended up working for a Jewish agency, in a poorly paid position. The family was supported largely by Berman's wife, Gustawa (née Grynberg), who was a well-regarded physician and dentist.

Berman's social contacts in Warsaw included many communist sympathizing members of the Polish intelligentsia; Janina and Władysław Broniewski, as well as Wanda Wasilewska, were among his associates. Between 1935 and 1936, he worked with Aleksander Wat (as his tutor on behalf of the KPP) in an attempt to establish a leftist periodical, with the intention of the cooperation of the communists with other leftist forces in Poland (mostly the Polish Socialist Party (PPS)), within the popular front.

== World War II ==
On 6 September 1939, after the invasion of Poland by Nazi Germany, Berman followed government directions for "able-bodied men" and took a train going in an easterly direction. He went to Białystok, occupied by the Soviet Union after the Soviet invasion of Poland. With his friend Alfred Lampe, Berman was active in Polish-communist circles there and became a Soviet citizen. In March 1941 he moved to Minsk, where he worked as an editor at Sztandar Wolności ('The Banner of Freedom'), a Polish-language bulletin published by the Communist Party of Byelorussia. Berman's doctoral dissertation, written under the direction of Krzywicki and entitled O strukturze miast polskich na podstawie spisu ludności w 1791 r. ('On the structure of Polish cities based on the population census of 1791'), was brought to Białystok by his friend and colleague Irena Sawicka, but burned in Minsk when a dormitory where Berman and other journalists were housed was bombed by the Germans.

After the German invasion of the Soviet Union in 1941, Berman escaped to Moscow. He later became an instructor at the International Lenin School, the Comintern school, where he trained displaced Polish communists, activists for the new Soviet-sponsored Polish Workers' Party (PPR). With the help from Georgi Dimitrov and Jerzy Borejsza, Berman was able to bring his wife and daughter Lucyna there too.

In December 1943, Berman met Joseph Stalin at a Kremlin reception for activists of the Union of Polish Patriots (ZPP). Berman became a prominent figure among the Polish communists in the Soviet Union (according to Berman, however, Stalin hated him).

In 1945, after a survey suggested that 4.8 million Polish citizens including 3 million Jews had died in the war, Berman stated "if we accept that 3 million Jews were murdered, we must significantly increase the number of Polish victims". He declared that 3 million non-Jewish Poles had died, in order to equalize the numbers, to make them acceptable to Polish public opinion. According to Jan Grabowski, this policy of "equalizing" the respective numbers of Jewish and Polish victims has since been propagated in Poland and that is how the issue is presently taught to students in public schools.

== Political career in communist-ruled Poland ==
In the summer of 1944, Berman joined the Politburo of the Polish Workers' Party (PPR) and returned to Poland. In Lublin, at the Polish Committee of National Liberation (PKWN), Berman practically led the foreign affairs department; which was primarily concerned with securing international recognition for the new communist-led governing entity.

In January 1945, with the conquest of Warsaw from the Nazis by the Red Army, the Provisional Government of the Republic of Poland (formerly the PKWN) moved from Lublin to the Praga district of Warsaw. Berman, as a member of the Politburo of the PPR, was charged with oversight of the state security apparatus (the Ministry of Public Security). In post-war Poland Berman organized state censorship, supervised the development of, and permissions for political parties and organizations, and was the main liaison between the PPR and the PKWN.^{[a]} Berman's decisions had to be consulted with and could be vetoed by two resident Soviet advisers, who remained in Poland until 1953 and 1954.

From 1948, together with Bolesław Bierut, general secretary of the Polish United Workers' Party (PZPR), a successor of the PPR, and economist Hilary Minc, Berman formed a triumvirate of Stalinist leaders of Poland.^{[b]} According to Lucyna Tych, Berman's daughter, all three "Stalinist" leaders sought to implement communism in Poland in ways different from the manner in which it was done earlier in the Soviet Union (while remaining entirely loyal to the Soviet leadership). Berman and Minc were close friends and partners. They successfully cooperated in protecting Poland's economic interests. For example, after their repeated interventions with the Soviets, the practice of dismantling industrial equipment in Poland and taking it to the Soviet Union was discontinued. They were somehow able to fend off Soviet attempts to introduce broader (Soviet-like) railroad tracks in Poland, which would cut-off Poland's transportation links with Germany and the West.

In late 1949, Stalin attempted to remove Berman from his position of power, accusing him of participation in an international anti-communist conspiracy and illicit foreign contacts, but the effort did not succeed. In 1952 Berman's friend Wasilewska, having found out Stalin's plan to eliminate Berman, traveled from Kyiv to Warsaw to warn him. Berman attributed his own survival to Bierut's protection.

In August 1951, Gomułka was arrested, probably on Stalin's and Lavrentiy Beria's orders; they demanded his quick trial. Berman and Bierut, however, managed to keep delaying the proceedings to the point that the trial never took place.

Berman became a member of the Politburo of the PZPR and remained in that capacity until 1956. He was responsible for science, literature and cultural affairs, propaganda and ideology. From 1949 to 1953, he was officially and personally involved in the fight for the dominant position of socialist realism in art and literature, but in the post-war years he also helped and cultivated contacts with many Polish artistic personalities and his influence was essential to the establishment and continuous existence of such Polish mainstream institutions as the Czytelnik publishing house or Cepelia chain of craft stores. The canon of classical Polish literature was published and the production of memorable films commenced. Berman helped Tadeusz Sygietyński organize the folk ensemble Mazowsze. Following Berman's repeated interventions with Vyacheslav Molotov and other Soviet authorities, the Ossolineum collections were transferred from Lviv to Wrocław in 1946 and 1947. In the spring of 1955, Berman authorized the creation of the Crooked Circle Club, a free discussion forum in Warsaw, which marked the gradual departure from Stalinism.

While Berman was one of the officials responsible for party oversight of the security apparatus, at least 200,000 people were imprisoned and some 6,000 executed on political charges. Hundreds of former members of the Polish resistance movement in World War II were persecuted, especially from the Home Army and the National Armed Forces.^{[c]}

== Fall from power ==
In 1952, Anna Duracz, Berman's secretary, was arrested. In 1954, he was attacked during a party plenum by Aleksander Zawadzki, who claimed that, as he originated from a bourgeois Jewish family, Berman lacked a proper understanding of the Polish workers' movement. After the death of First Secretary Bierut, Berman resigned from the PZPR Politburo (and from the position of first deputy prime minister) in May 1956. He was earlier incriminated by Józef Światło, a former official in the Ministry of Public Security, who defected to the West. Berman was relieved from the Central Committee of the PZPR in the fall of 1956 and in May 1957, in the aftermath of the Polish October, dismissed from the party altogether. He attempted to get his membership reinstated, wrote appeals in 1960 and 1964, but was rejected on both occasions. He was considered responsible for the "Stalinist-era errors and distortions" by which they meant dogmatic and sectarian party attitudes and breaking the rule of law.

== Retirement ==
For two years Bermam remained without steady employment and supported himself by accepting various assignments, such as translations of works by Karl Marx and Friedrich Engels. In September 1958, Berman was placed by the party in the state-run Książka i Wiedza ('Book and Knowledge') publishing house, where he worked until he was retired by the authorities in 1968. His wife was removed from her position at the Rheumatology Institute. For the first time, according to his daughter Lucyna Tychowa, Berman could enjoy normal life with his family and friends. He engaged in activities, such as reading or attending films and theatrical productions. In the autumn of 1981, he was hit by a car and permanently injured while he attempted to cross a street. He died in Warsaw in April 1984 and was buried at Powązki Cemetery.

== Awards and decorations ==
- Order of the Banner of Labour, 1st Class (24 December 1951)
- Commander's Cross with Star of the Order of Polonia Restituta (19 July 1946)
- Grand Officer of the Order of the White Lion (Czechoslovakia, 1947)
- Hungarian Order of Merit (Hungary, 1948)
- Order of Merits for the People, 1st Class (Yugoslavia, 1946)
- Order of Civil Merit (Bulgaria, 1946)
- Order of the 9 September 1944, 2nd Class (Bulgaria, 1948)

== Notes ==
a. Speaking during a plenum of the PPR in October 1947, Berman strongly expressed his agreement with Gomułka's views: "It is our tremendous achievement, as communists, that we are able to create a national party, which has become deeply rooted in Polish society. ... It is our greatest treasure, which we have to defend, and will not ever allow anybody to push us back to the enchanted ring of the KPP. It had been our greatest disaster. ... We are not a communist party, we are the PPR". Already in August–September 1948, Berman found it necessary to alter his views in order to comply with Stalin's current directives. They required the "building of the foundations of socialism" according to the Soviet example.

b. Berman told a story to Teresa Torańska, by whom he was interviewed in the early 1980s. Afterwards, he requested that Torańska refrains from printing it, because he was concerned that his revelations may reflect badly on Bierut, "a noble man". Torańska published the account anyway.

In November 1949, at Belweder Palace, Bierut wanted to give Berman investigation files concerning cases of officers accused of political crimes, because he wanted Berman's opinion on the matter. Berman declined to take the files, because he considered them contrived and worthless. He asked Bierut to make sure that no death sentences are issued based on such evidence. Berman soon regretted not having taken the files and cooperated with Bierut's procedure. Bierut, who normally followed his advice, this time did not and twenty death sentences were eventually carried out. "Unfortunately", lamented Berman, "he believed in those papers too much".

c. The degree and nature of Berman's involvement with the state security apparatus are matters of controversy. It is not known whether he was kept informed by Minister Stanisław Radkiewicz and his people, or whether they saw him, an idealistic communist, as an impediment to their operation. According to the testimony of people familiar with Berman in this role, he often alleviated the cruelties of the system. He had no formal decision-making capacity, which rested with Gomułka and Bierut, or with Radkiewicz at the operational level. On the other hand, as the communist regime struggled to contain the armed underground in the mid-1040s, Berman lobbied for an expansion of state security. Berman is also believed to be responsible for the lessening of political repression, which began in the later 1940s.

Berman, responsible for culture, was despised by the literary circles and others, on whom he had imposed harsh censorship and other restrictions. After the death of Bierut, Berman's adversaries produced highly negative written evaluations of him in printed media and he quickly became a scapegoat for all the misdeeds of the Stalinist period. A "good Bierut and bad Berman" stereotype was created.
