= Slonimsky Uyezd =

Subdivision of the Grodno Governorate of the Russian Empire

Slonimsky Uyezd (Russian: Слонимский уезд) was one of the nine subdivisions of the Grodno Governorate of the Russian Empire. It was situated in the northeastern part of the governorate. Its administrative centre was Slonim.

== Demographics ==
At the time of the Russian Empire Census of 1897, Slonimsky Uyezd had a population of 226,274. Of these, 80.7% spoke Belarusian, 15.2% Yiddish, 2.1% Russian, 1.6% Polish, 0.1% Lithuanian, 0.1% Ukrainian, 0.1% Tatar and 0.1% German as their native language.
