= Józef Światło =

Polish defector

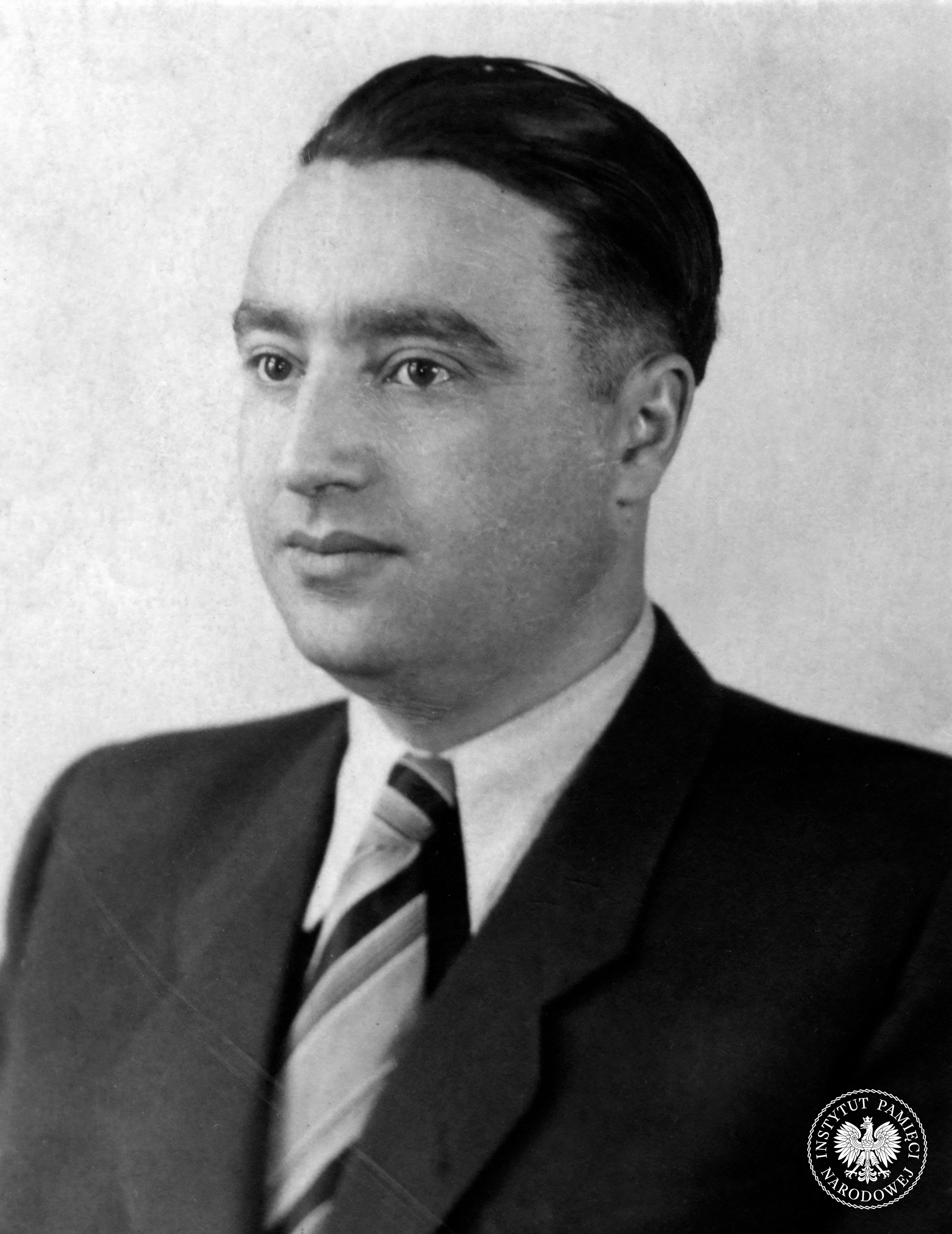
- Józef Światło in 1952
- Born: Izaak Fleischfarb; 1 January 1915; Medyn, Galicia, Austria-Hungary
- Died: 2 September 1994 (aged 79); U.S.
- Other names: Izaak Lichtstein; Izak Fleischfarb
- Citizenship: Polish
- Occupations: Interrogator, deputy director
- Employer: Ministry of Public Security (UB)

Józef Światło, born Izaak Fleischfarb (1 January 1915 – 2 September 1994), was a high-ranking official in the Ministry of Public Security of Poland (UB) who served as deputy director of the 10th Department run by Anatol Fejgin. Known for supervising the torture of political prisoners, he was nicknamed "the Butcher" by the detainees.

After the 1953 death of Joseph Stalin and arrest of Lavrentiy Beria, Światło traveled to East Germany on official business. While on the Berlin subway with Fejgin, passing through West Berlin, on 5 December 1953, he "slipped away" and defected to the West.

Afterwards he worked for the American Central Intelligence Agency and Radio Free Europe. Światło's written and broadcast denunciations shook the Polish United Workers' Party. This ultimately contributed to post-Stalinist reforms of the Polish security apparatus and to Poland's political liberalisation in the socialist Polish October revolution.

== Biography ==
Józef Światło was born on 1 January 1915 as Izaak Fleischfarb (also Fleichfarb, Licht, or Lichtstein, sources vary), (Note: Sources vary in giving his original surname. IPN lists it as Fleischfarb, noting that this name was used by Światło himself in some documents; this name is used most commonly in the sources. Several sources, such as Gluchowski, use an alternative spelling - Fleichfarb. Piotrowski and several other sources also list one or two other name variants, namely: Licht and Lichtstein.) into a Jewish family in Medyn village near Zbarazh in Galicia (now Ukraine). In the Second Polish Republic he was first a Zionist and later, a communist activist. He was arrested twice for his illegal activities. Conscripted in 1939, he served in the Polish Army (Polish 6th Infantry Division) during the German invasion that year. Taken prisoner by the Germans, he escaped, only to be taken prisoner by the Red Army, which invaded Eastern Poland where his family lived and was deported east along with hundreds of thousands of others. It was also in that period that, on 26 April 1943, he married Justyna Światło, taking her more Polish-sounding surname. Światło eventually joined the Polish Forces in the East (Polish 1st Tadeusz Kościuszko Infantry Division, Berling's Army), becoming a political officer; he was also promoted to junior lieutenant (podporucznik) and became involved in organising state administration in areas taken from the Germans.

In 1945, he was transferred to the newly formed Ministry of Public Security of Poland (officially MBP, but commonly abbreviated to UB). In his work, Światło, like many other communist secret police agents, used torture and forgery. He was involved in arresting hundreds of members of Polish underground organization, Armia Krajowa, its leadership (the Trial of the Sixteen) and falsifying of the 1946 Polish referendum. In time he was promoted to lieutenant colonel (podpułkownik) and served in various offices and departments. In 1951 he ended up in the 10th Department, where he was one of the leading officers. The 10th Department was responsible for handling the Party members themselves. He received orders personally from the First Secretary of the Polish United Workers' Party Bolesław Bierut, and arrested such notable people as politicians Władysław Gomułka and Marian Spychalski, General Michał Rola-Żymierski, and Cardinal Stefan Wyszyński. He had access – sometimes unique – to many secret documents. He interrogated Noel Field on 27 August 1949 in Budapest as well as his brother, Herman Field (a US citizen who went to Poland to look for his brother). Herman would be secretly imprisoned for five years, until the information on him was revealed - by Światło himself.

=== Defection to the West ===
In November 1953, the First Secretary of the Polish United Workers' Party Bolesław Bierut asked Politburo member Jakub Berman to send Światło on an important mission to East Berlin. Światło, deputy head of UB's 10th Department, together with Colonel Anatol Fejgin, were asked to consult with Stasi chief Erich Mielke about eliminating Wanda Brońska. Światło, however, after the death of Stalin in March 1953 and arrest of Lavrentiy Beria in June that year, became afraid for his own life. He suspected that Bierut in Poland might turn on him and other members of the Ministry, attempting to make them into scapegoats.

The two officers traveled to Berlin and spoke with Mielke. On 5 December 1953, the day after meeting the Stasi chief, Światło defected to the U.S. military mission in West Berlin. He left family, including a wife and two children, in Poland. The next day, American military authorities transported Światło to Frankfurt and by Christmas he had been flown to Washington, D.C., where he underwent an extensive debriefing. It has been reported that his interrogations were compiled into about fifty long reports. The United States gave him political asylum with the full knowledge that "he would have to be protected for the rest of his life because the number of his victims and relatives of victims sworn to exact retribution was so great."

== Aftermath ==
Światło's defection was revealed in Poland by the Polish Press Agency on 25 October 1954, with Światło labelled a traitor and provocateur. It was widely publicised in the United States and Europe by the US authorities, as well as in Poland via Radio Free Europe (RFE), embarrassing the Communist authorities in Warsaw. The first international press conference with Światło took place on 28 September 1954. He had intimate knowledge of the internal politics of the Polish government, especially the activities of the various secret services. Over the course of the following months, US newspapers and RFE (in the "Behind the Scenes of the Secret Police and the Party" cycle) reported extensively on political repression in Poland based on Światło's revelations.

Capitalising on them, in what was known as "Operation Spotlight", RFE broadcast some 140 interviews by Światło, and 30 programs on him. Światło's RFE broadcasts were not only serialized but even distributed over Poland by special balloons. Światło detailed the torture of prisoners under interrogation and politically motivated executions and struggles inside the Polish United Workers' Party. None of the Polish Communists' intelligence, counterintelligence and public security agencies escaped unscathed and without some of their secrets being revealed.

The highly publicised defection of Colonel Światło, not to mention the general hatred of the Ministry of Public Security among Poles, led to changes in late 1954, as first the 10th Department and soon the entire Ministry was broken up and reorganised; many officials were arrested. Światło's scandal contributed to the events of political liberalisation in Poland, known as the Polish October. For a long time, it was uncertain if Światło was dead or still alive. Information on him was protected by the US witness protection program; there were rumours that he died in the late 1960s, 1975 or 1985. In 2010, the United States government stated that he had died on 2 September 1994. Documents relating to him are still classified in the United States and not available to researchers.

== Awards ==

Knight's Cross of Order of Polonia Restituta	Gold Cross of Merit	Silver Cross of Merit

== See also ==
- List of Eastern Bloc defectors
