= Jerzy Borejsza =

Polish communist activist and writer (1905–1952)

- Born: Beniamin Goldberg; 1905; Warsaw, Congress Poland, Russian Empire
- Died: 1952 (aged 46); Warsaw, Polish People's Republic
- Occupations: Publisher, writer
- Known for: Co-founder of Union of Polish Patriots
- Political party: Communist Party of Poland (1929–1938); Polish Workers' Party (1942–1948)

Jerzy Borejsza (Polish pronunciation: [ˈjɛʐɨ bɔˈrɛjʂa]; born Beniamin Goldberg; 14 July 1905 in Warsaw – 19 January 1952 in Warsaw) was a Polish communist activist and writer. During the Stalinist period of communist Poland, he was chief of a state press and publishing syndicate.

== Biography ==
Borejsza was born as Beniamin Goldberg to a Polish Jewish family. He was an older brother of Józef Różański – later a member of the Soviet NKVD and high-ranking interrogator in the Ministry of Public Security of Poland. As a youth, Borejsza sympathized with the Zionist radical left and anarchic political factions. After he got in trouble with the Polish authorities, his father sponsored his residence in France. Borejsza studied engineering, then Hispanic culture at the Sorbonne, and remained deeply involved with the politics and activism of anarchism.

After his studies, Borejsza returned home and was briefly enlisted in the Polish Army in the late 1920s. In 1929, he joined the Communist Party of Poland (KPP). In the Second Polish Republic, he was imprisoned several times in the years 1933–1935 for agitation and political propaganda.

After the Soviet invasion of Poland of 1939, Borejsza became a vocal supporter of the Soviet communist regime, publishing Polish language translations of Soviet propaganda. He served as director of the Ossolineum Institute in Lwów (Lviv) in 1939–1940. After the war, as Lviv was transferred to the Ukrainian SSR, he aided the transport of most of Ossolineum archives to Wrocław. He was one of the founders of the Union of Polish Patriots – an organization from which the communist government of post-war Poland in part originated. Borejsza served with the rank of major in the Red Army, and then in the Polish First Army.

He organized and edited the chief organ of the PKWN, which was the daily newspaper "Rzeczpospolita". In 1944, he founded the weekly "Odrodzenie", which he entrusted to Karol Kuryluk. It was in its pages that in January 1945 Borejsza published his programmatic article Revolution Gentle, in which he made an offer to the Polish intelligentsia to cooperate in building post-war cultural life. Around "Rebirth" it was possible to gather debutants known later: Julia Hartwig, Anna Kamieńska, Jacek Bocheński and Zygmunt Kałużyński. Authors with already recognized names also published on its pages. In 1948, on the wave of changes in cultural policy, Borejsza took over the editorship of "Rebirth" and managed it until 1950, that is, until the magazine was merged with "Kuźnica" and "Nowa Kultura" was created. Signatory of the Stockholm Appeal in 1950.

He joined the new pro-Soviet Polish communist party, the Polish Workers' Party, and became a deputy to the State National Council. He organized much of communist propaganda in post-war Poland and was a leading figure in the implementation of state control and censorship in the area of culture. He created the giant publishing house Czytelnik ('The Reader'). Borejsza favored a moderate approach to culture control, which he called a "gentle revolution". He supported establishing cultural relations with the West, and himself traveled to United States and the United Kingdom. In 1948, he was one of the main organizers of the World Congress of Intellectuals in Defense of Peace in Wrocław. He fell out of favor with the Stalinist hardliners who saw him as too independent, too hard to influence, and not radical enough. His political role diminished in the late 1940s, particularly after the disabling injuries he suffered in a car accident in 1949.

Borejsza received the Order of Polonia Restituta. He was buried at the Powązki Cemetery in Warsaw.

== Works ==
- Hiszpania 1873–1936 ('Spain 1873–1936', 1937)
- Na rogatkach kultury polskiej ('At the Outskirts of Polish Culture', 1947)

== Quotes ==
- Czesław Miłosz, Polish writer and Nobel Prize winner, once wrote in his memoirs about Borejsza: "The most international of Polish communists. ... He built from nothing, starting in 1945, his paper empire of books and press. Czytelnik and other publishing houses, newspapers, magazines; all was dependent on him – jobs, publications, wages. I was in his stable, we all were."
- Maria Dąbrowska, Polish writer, wrote about him in her memoirs: "He created a large organization, an organization encompassing the publishing – newspapers-books and readers, created with an almost American flare. But the aim of this organization was a slow and deliberate Sovietization and Russification of Polish culture."
- Jan Kott, Polish writer, wrote about him in his memoirs: "...simply known as the Boss. ... Czytelnik was a state within a state … especially for writers. "
- Pablo Neruda, Chilean poet and Nobel Prize winner, also wrote in his memoirs about Borejsza: "Borejsza was a tireless down to earth man, who converted dreams into actions. ... Now the great Borejsza, a scrawny, dynamic Quixote, an admirer of Sancho Panza like the other Quixote, sensitive and wise, builder and dreamer, is resting for the first time" – Pablo Neruda, "Pablo Neruda Memoirs" (Original Spanish Edition: Confieso que he vivido: memorias, 1974), Farrar Straus and Giroux, 1977.

== See also ==
- Culture in the Polish People's Republic
