= Polish October =

1956 Polish period of liberalisation and destalinisation

- Part of the Cold War
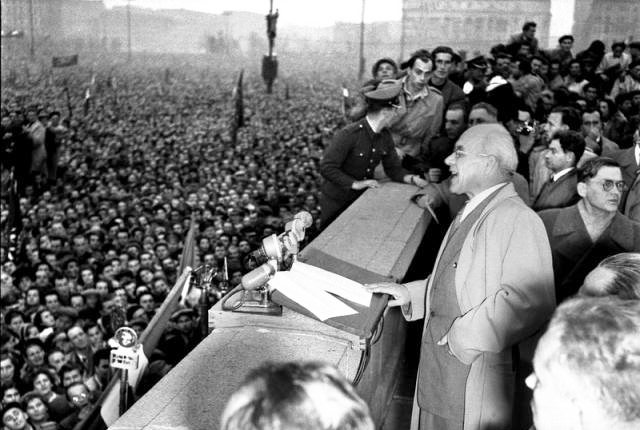
- Władysław Gomułka at the height of his popularity on 24 October 1956 addressing a crowd of people in Warsaw, asking for an end to demonstrations and a return to work.
| Date | October–December 1956; Main phase: 19 – 22 October 1956 |
| Location | Polish People's Republic |
| Result | Puławian faction diplomatic victory: Confirmation of Władysław Gomułka as leader of the Polish United Workers' Party; Defusing of Polish-Soviet tensions; armed conflict averted; End of Stalinist era in Poland, beginning of the political thaw; Status of forces agreement on Soviet troops in Poland; withdrawal of many Soviet advisors; Hungarian Revolution of 1956 |

Parties involved in dispute
| Soviet Union | Poland |

Commanders and leaders
| (Soviet Union) Nikita Khrushchev; (Soviet Union) Anastas Mikoyan; (Soviet Union) Nikolai Bulganin; (Soviet Union) Vyacheslav Molotov | (Poland) Władysław Gomułka; (Poland) Edward Ochab; (Poland) Józef Cyrankiewicz; (Poland) Aleksander Zawadzki |

Political support
| Natolin faction (Stalinists) | Puławian faction (pro-Thaw) |

The Polish October (Polish: Polski październik [ˈpɔl.ski paʑˈd͡ʑɛr.ɲik]), also known as the Polish thaw or Gomułka's thaw, as well as the "small stabilization" (Polish: mała stabilizacja) was a change in the politics of the Polish People's Republic that occurred in October 1956. Władysław Gomułka was appointed First Secretary of the ruling Polish United Workers' Party (PZPR) marking the end of Stalinism in Poland.

The hardline Stalinist faction of the PZPR was weakened in 1956 from the Secret Speech by Soviet leader Nikita Khrushchev in February, the death of Polish leader Bolesław Bierut in March, and the violent protests in Poznań in June. These events highlighted the people's dissatisfaction with the situation in Poland which allowed Gomułka's nationalist reformer faction to come to power. The Soviets were pressured to compromise with the Gomułka faction, leading to brief but tense negotiations. The Soviets gave permission for Gomułka to stay in power and greater autonomy to Poland in exchange for maintaining its loyalty to Moscow.

The Polish October resulted in a temporary liberalisation and the effective end of Stalinism in Poland, though Gomułka's regime became more oppressive during the 1960s. News of the events in Poland contributed to the more violent but less successful Hungarian Revolution of 1956. Some social scientists term it the Polish October Revolution which, despite being less dramatic than the Hungarian Revolution, may have had an even deeper impact on the Eastern Bloc and on the Soviet Union's relationship with its satellite states.

== Background ==
The Polish October was caused by several factors. The death of Joseph Stalin in 1953 and the resulting Destalinization and the Khrushchev Thaw prompted debates about fundamental issues throughout the entire Eastern Bloc. Criticism of Stalin and Stalinism had been unthinkable during his lifetime, but his death led to a succession crisis for leadership of the Communist Party of the Soviet Union (CPSU), giving an opportunity for anti-Stalinists to attain power and influence policy. The widely publicised defection of high-ranking Polish secret police agent Józef Światło had embarrassed the PZPR internationally and resulted in the weakening of the Ministry of Public Security.

In the summer of 1955, the 5th World Festival of Youth and Students was held in Warsaw. Designed to be a vast propaganda exercise and a meeting place for Eastern European communists and their comrades from Western Europe, Asia, Africa and South America, the event brought hundreds of thousands of Polish spectators to Warsaw for the five days to watch dancing, theatre and other attractions. However, the real attractions for the Polish people were the foreigners, many of whom were from Western Europe and contrasted starkly with local Poles because they shared a similar culture but were much richer and more open. Deeply stricken, many Poles realised that a decade's worth of anti-Western rhetoric had been false. Poles, East Germans, Hungarians, Czechoslovaks and others from the communist bloc actively socialised with one another. With the more exotic visitors, Poles also socialised in private apartments all around the city. College students even held debating meetings with foreigners, many of whom turned out not to be communists.

By 1956, Nikita Khrushchev had emerged as the CPSU's First Secretary, making him the successor to Stalin. In February, during the 20th Congress of the Communist Party of the Soviet Union, Khrushchev delivered the speech titled On the Personality Cult and Its Consequences (commonly known as the Secret Speech) with wide implications for the Soviet Union and other communist countries. Khrushchev was highly critical of Stalin, denouncing both him personally and his rule, much to the shock of those in attendance and eventually the communist world as news of the speech had spread. However, this broke the social stigma towards criticising Stalin and Stalinism within the communist movement. Bolesław Bierut, the General Secretary of the PZPR known as the "Stalin of Poland" for his devout Stalinism, was in Moscow to attend the 20th Congress. Bierut's poor health caused him to be hospitalised and he remained in Moscow while the rest of the Polish delegation returned, creating a prime opportunity for the anti-Stalinists. The PZPR Secretariat decided that Khrushchev's speech should have wide circulation in Poland, a unique decision in the Eastern Bloc.

In Poland, in addition to criticism of the cult of personality, popular topics of debate centered on the right to steer a more independent course of "local, national socialism", instead of following the Soviet model in every detail. For example, many members of the PZPR criticised Stalin's execution of older Polish communists during the Great Purge. On 3 March, during a conference of PZPR activists in Warsaw, Stefan Staszewski and others severely criticized the contemporary party leadership, including the absent Bierut. On 12 March, Beirut died unexpectedly while still in Moscow, leading to increased rivalry between various factions of the PZPR and growing tensions in Polish society. Bierut's successors seized on Khrushchev's condemnation of Stalinist policy as an opportunity to prove their reformist democratic credentials and their willingness to break with the Stalinist legacy.

== Protests and riots ==
In late March and early April 1956, thousands of PZPR meetings were held all over Poland, with the blessing of the Politburo and the Secretariat. Tens of thousands took part in such meetings. The Secretariat's plan succeeded beyond what it had expected. The political atmosphere in Poland shifted as questions were increasingly asked about taboo subjects like the Polish communists' legitimacy, the responsibility for Stalin's crimes, the arrest of the increasingly-popular Władysław Gomułka, and issues in Soviet–Polish relations, such as the continued Soviet military presence in Poland, the Molotov–Ribbentrop Pact, the Katyn massacre and the Soviet failure to support the Warsaw Uprising. A new Party Congress was demanded, as were a greater role for the Sejm and a guarantee of personal liberties. Alarmed by the process, the Party Secretariat decided to withhold the speech from the general public.

=== Poznań protests ===
In June, dissatisfaction with the status quo eventually led to a mass demonstration by factory workers at the Joseph Stalin Metal Industries in the city of Poznań. They began a spontaneous strike when around 80% of the factory's workers had lost their bonus pay when the government suddenly raised the required work quota. This grew into a wider protest against issues such as shortages of food and consumer goods, bad housing, the decline in real income, trade relations with the Soviet Union, and the poor management of the economy. The Polish government responded with a harsh crackdown, branding the protestors as "provocateurs, counterrevolutionaries and imperialist agents," and the demonstration soon turned into a violent riot. Between 57 and 78 people, mostly protesters, were killed, and hundreds were wounded and arrested. Soon, however, the party hierarchy recognised that the riots had awakened a nationalist movement and reversed their opinion. Wages were raised by 50%, and economic and political change was promised.

=== Autumn protests ===
The Poznań protests, although the largest, were not unique in Poland, where social protest resumed its fury that autumn. On November 18, rioters destroyed the Milicja Obywatelska headquarters and radio jamming equipment in Bydgoszcz, and on 10 December a crowd in Szczecin attacked public buildings, including a prison, the state prosecutor's office, Milicja headquarters and the Soviet consulate. People across the country criticised the security police and asked for the dissolution of the public security committee and the punishment of its most guilty functionaries. Demands were made for the exposure of secret police collaborators, and suspected collaborators were frequently assaulted. In many localities, crowds gathered outside the secret police headquarters, shouted hostile slogans and broke windows. Public meetings, demonstrations and street marches took place in hundreds of towns across Poland. The meetings were usually organized by local party cells, local authorities and trade unions. However, official organisers tended to lose control as the political content exceeded their original agenda. Most of the striking workers were opposed to the Stalinist system, but did not call for a return to capitalism. The principle inspiration was Yugoslavia where a system of worker's self-management of factories had been instituted. Most of the economic demands made by the protest called for a system similar to what existed in Yugoslavia.

Crowds often took radical action, which often resulted in unrest on the streets and clashes with police and other law enforcement agencies. Street activity peaked during and immediately after the 19–21 October "VIII Plenum" meeting of the Central Committee of the PZPR but continued until late in the year. A concurrent upsurge in religious and clerical sentiment took place. Hymns were sung, and the release of Stefan Wyszyński and the reinstatement of suppressed bishops were demanded. Nationalism was the cement of mass mobilisation and dominated public meetings during which people sang the Polish national anthem and other patriotic songs, demanded the return of the White Eagle to the flag and traditional army uniforms, and attacked Poland's dependence on the Soviet Union and its military. They demanded the return of the eastern territories from the Soviets, an explanation for the Katyn massacre, and the elimination of the Russian language from the educational curriculum. In the last ten days of October, monuments to the Red Army, despised by Poles, were attacked. Red stars were pulled down from roofs of houses, factories and schools, red flags were destroyed, and portraits of Red Army general Konstantin Rokossovsky were defaced. Attempts were made to force entries into the homes of Soviet citizens, mostly in Lower Silesia, which was home to many Soviet Army troops. However, unlike the protesters in Hungary and Poznań, activists limited their political demands and behaviour, which were not purely opposed to the communist system. The communist authorities were not openly and unequivocally challenged, as they had been in June, and anti-communist slogans, which had been prevalent in the June uprising, such as "We want free elections", "Down with Communist dictatorship" or "Down with the Party", were much less prevalent. Local PZPR committees were not attacked by the protesters.

== Change in the political leadership ==
=== Return of Gomułka ===
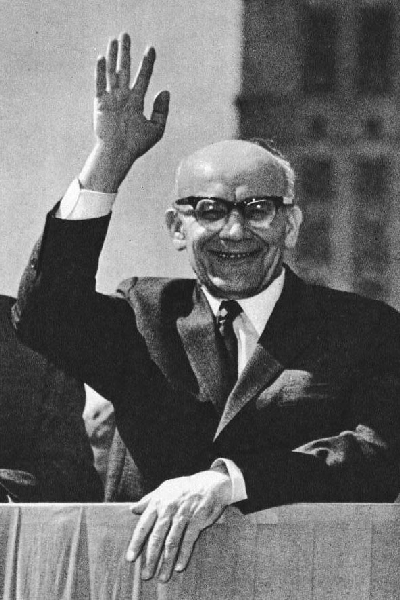
Władysław Gomułka

In October, Edward Ochab, the First Secretary of the PZPR since Bierut's death, proposed Władysław Gomułka for election as First Secretary during the 8th Plenum meeting. Gomułka and Bierut had been archrivals in the State National Council during World War II. Gomułka was a moderate communist skeptical of the Soviets, in contrast to Bierut who was a devout Stalinist loyal to Moscow. Gomułka had been the General Secretary of the Polish Workers' Party (predecessor to the PZPR) since 1943, and had served as the de facto leader of Poland from 1947 until being ousted from power by the Stalinists in 1948. He was expelled from the party in 1949 and imprisoned in 1951 after accusastions of "right-wing nationalist deviation" by Stalinist hardliners, along with Bierut, until being released in 1954.

Gomułka proved to be acceptable to both factions of Polish communists: the reformers, who were arguing for liberalization of the system, and the hardliners, who realised that they needed to compromise. Gomułka insisted on being given real powers to implement reforms. One specific condition that he set was Soviet Marshal Rokossovsky, who had mobilized troops against the Poznań workers, be removed from the Politburo of the PZPR and Ministry of National Defence, to which Ochab agreed. The majority of the Polish leadership, backed by both the Polish People's Army and the Internal Security Corps, brought Gomułka and several associates into the Politburo and designated Gomułka as First Secretary. Untouched by the scandals of Stalinism, Gomułka was acceptable to the Polish masses but at first was viewed with much suspicion by Moscow.

=== Soviet reaction ===
The Soviet leadership viewed events in Poland with alarm. Destalinisation was underway in the Soviet Union as well, but the Soviet leadership did not view the democratic reform that the Polish public desired as an acceptable solution. In Moscow, the belief was that any liberalisation in one country could lead to the destruction of communism and the ruin of Soviet influence in the region as a whole. The Soviet Union was not worried about only the political implications of reform but also its economic implications. Economically, the Soviet Union heavily invested in much of the Eastern Bloc and was striving for integration of its economies. The Soviet Union had financed Polish industry and was Poland's main trading partner. The Soviet Union directed the products that Poland manufactured, bought the products and exported goods to Poland that were no longer produced in it. That integration meant any reform, be it political or economic, in one country would have a great impact on the other. Because Poland was inextricably connected to the Soviet Union economically, the thought of an independent Polish economy was unrealistic. The country had been forced to rely on the Soviets for so long that breaking away completely would prove disastrous. Thus, both countries held crucial power in different facets: Poland could threaten Soviet strength and power in Eastern Europe politically, and the Soviet Union could essentially destroy the Polish economy. Therefore, any reform in the Polish government would have to concede to some Soviet demands, but the Soviets concurrently would have to concede to a vital partner.

A high-level delegation of the Central Committee of the CPSU flew to Poland in an attempt to block removing pro-Soviet members of Politburo of the PZPR, mainly Rokossovsky. The Soviet delegation was led by Khrushchev and included Anastas Mikoyan, Nikolai Bulganin, Vyacheslav Molotov, Lazar Kaganovich and Ivan Konev. The negotiations were tense as both Polish and Soviet troops were put on alert and engaged in "manoeuvres" that were used as thinly veiled threats. Even before the Soviet delegation arrived, Soviet armed forces stationed in Poland (including two armored divisions) left their bases and started moving towards Warsaw. When ordered to halt their advance, they were only 100 km from the Polish national capital.

=== Polish-Soviet negotiations ===
The Polish leadership made it clear that the face of communism had to become more nationalised and that the Soviets could no longer directly control the Polish people. The Soviets were disadvantaged as, during Stalinism, they had placed Moscow-friendly Poles or Soviets themselves in important political positions in Poland. After denouncing Stalinism so vehemently in his speech, Khrushchev could not regress to the Stalinist position by forcing more Soviets into the Polish leadership. However, in recognising the cries of the public, the Poles needed to keep the Soviets from direct control but could not raise their demands to a point that endangered their relationships in the bloc. Gomułka demanded increased autonomy and permission to carry out some reforms, but also reassured the Soviets that the reforms were internal matters and that Poland had no intention of abandoning communism or its treaties with the Soviet Union. The Soviets were also pressured by the Chinese Communist Party to accommodate the Polish demands. Simultaneously, the Soviets were increasingly distracted by Hungarian Revolution of 1956 taking place in neighbouring Hungary, another one of its satellite states. Information about events in Poland reached the people of Hungary via Radio Free Europe's news and commentary services between 19 October and 22 October 1956. A student demonstration in Budapest in support of Gomułka, asking for similar reforms in Hungary, was one of the events that sparked the revolt. The events in Hungary, more aggressive and violent in nature, helped distract the Soviets and ensure the success of the Polish October.

Eventually, when Khrushchev was reassured that Gomułka would not alter the basic foundations of Polish communism, he withdrew the invasion threat and agreed to compromise, and Gomułka was confirmed in his new position. According to the account Khrushchev gave in his memoirs, he ordered the Soviet troops to halt in place after he was personally confronted by Gomułka who, according to Khrushchev, was in a state of agitation and "demanded" that the troops return to their bases, or "something terrible and irreversible will happen." Khrushchev claims that he was never against appointing Gomułka at the helm of PZPR and had expected him to be elevated to the top post ever since he was released from prison.

== Aftermath ==
=== Political effects ===
The leadership of the PZPR's stance contributed to the relatively-moderate political dimension of social protest in October. The nationalist emotions that had spurred protest against the PZPR in June would become in support of it, with the threat of Soviet invasion against Gomułka and his supporters. In June, they were still treated as puppets and servants of alien, anti-Polish interests and excluded from the national community. In October, they became a part of the nation opposing Soviet domination, with Gomułka being enthusiastically supported by the great majority of society, not primarily as a communist leader but as a leader of a nation who, by resisting Soviet demands, embodied a national longing for independence and sovereignty. His name was chanted, along with anti-Soviet slogans, at thousands of meetings: "Go home Rokossovsky", "Down with the Russians," "Long live Gomułka" and "We want a free Poland". Gomułka's anti-Soviet image was exaggerated but was justified in the popular imagination by his anti-Stalinist line in 1948, and years of subsequent internment. Thus, Polish communists found themselves unexpectedly at the head of a national liberation movement. The enthusiastic public support offered to Gomułka contributed to the legitimisation of communist rule in Poland, which incorporated mass nationalist, anti-Soviet feelings into the prevailing power structures.

Gomułka, however, could not and did not want to reject communism or Soviet domination; he could only steer Poland towards increased independence and "Polish national communism". Because of these restricted ambitions, which were recognized by the Soviets, the limited Polish revolution succeeded where the radical Hungarian one did not. In Hungary social protest destroyed the political system, where in Poland it was absorbed into it. Norman Davies sums up the effect as a transformation of Poland from puppet state to client state; Raymond Pearson similarly states that Poland changed from a Soviet colony to a dominion. Nonetheless, some social scientists, such as Zbigniew Brzezinski and Frank Gibney, refer to these changes as a revolution, one less dramatic than its Hungarian counterpart but one which may have had an even more profound impact on the Eastern Bloc. Timothy Garton Ash calls the Polish October the most significant event in the post-war history of Poland until the rise of Solidarity. History professor Iván T. Berend claims that while the effects of the Polish October on the Eastern Bloc may be disputed, it set the course for the eventual fall of communism in the Polish People's Republic. In China, some leaders viewed the events in Poland, together with the Hungarian protests, as demonstrating the danger of overemphasizing heavy industry while paying insufficient attention to people's livelihoods.

=== Gomułka's rule ===
Gomułka, in his public speeches, criticized the hardships of Stalinism and promised reforms to democratize the country; this was received with much enthusiasm by Polish society. By mid-November, Gomułka had secured substantive gains in his negotiations with the Soviets: the cancellation of Poland's existing debts, new preferential trade terms, abandonment of the unpopular Soviet-imposed collectivization of Polish agriculture, and permission to liberalize policy towards the Roman Catholic Church. In December, the status of Soviet forces in Poland, the Northern Group of Forces, was finally regulated. In the aftermath of the October events, Rokossovsky and many other Soviet "advisers" left Poland, signaling that Moscow was willing to grant Polish communists slightly more independence in exchange for allegiance. The Polish government rehabilitated many victims of the Stalinist era, and many political prisoners were set free, among them was cardinal Stefan Wyszyński and underground activist Stanisława Rachwałowa. The Polish legislative election of 1957 was much more liberal than that of 1952, although still not considered free by Western standards.

Gomułka's pledge to follow a "Polish road to socialism" more in harmony with national traditions and preferences caused many Poles to interpret the dramatic confrontation of 1956 as a sign that the end of the dictatorship was in sight. Initially very popular for his reforms, they were optimistically referred to at the time as "Gomułka's thaw" to complement the Khrushchev thaw in the Soviet Union. Society became more liberal (as seen, for instance, in the achievements of the Polish Film School and the creation of such controversial movies as Ashes and Diamonds), and a civil society started to develop, but half-hearted democratization was not enough to satisfy the Polish public. Gomułka gradually softened his opposition to Soviet pressures, and the late-1950s hopes for major political change in Poland were replaced with growing disillusionment by the 1960s. Afraid of destabilizing the system and pressured to solve mounting issues, his rule would become stagnant and authoritarian, slowly reversing much of the liberalisation. By the time of the March 1968 events, Gomułka's thaw would be long over, and increasing economic problems and popular discontent would end up removing Gomułka from power in 1970 — ironically, in a situation similar to the protests that once had propelled him to power. In the end, Gomułka failed in his goal to salvage communism—or socialism—in Poland.
