= Józef Różański =

Polish secret police officer (1907–1981)

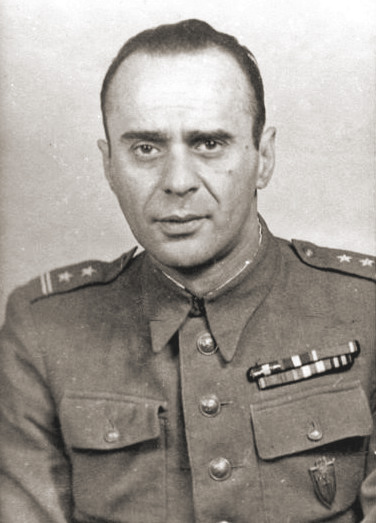
- Lieutenant colonel Józef Różański
- Born: 13 July 1907; Warsaw, Russian Empire
- Died: 21 August 1981 (aged 74); Warsaw, Polish People's Republic
- Military career
- Allegiance: Polish People's Republic
- Branch: Ministry of Public Security
- Service years: 1944–1954
- Rank: Pułkownik (Colonel)
- Nickname: Józef Goldberg
- Commands: Director of the Investigation Department of the Ministry of Public Security
- Conflicts: World War II
- Awards
- Other work: Member of Parliament

Józef Różański (Polish pronunciation: [ˈjuzɛf ruˈʐaj̃skʲi]; born Josef Goldberg; 13 July 1907 – 21 August 1981) was an officer in the Soviet NKVD and later, a Colonel in the Polish Ministry of Public Security (UB), the communist secret police. Born into a Polish-Jewish family in Warsaw, Różański became very active in the Communist Party of Poland before World War II. He joined the NKVD following the Soviet invasion of Poland and after the war, adopting the name Różański, served as an agent with the Polish Communist Security apparatus (Urząd Bezpieczeństwa).

Różański was personally involved in torturing dozens of opponents of the Polish People's Republic (PRL), including anti-communists and "Cursed soldiers". He gained notoriety as one of the most brutal secret police Officers in Warsaw. Różański personally administered torture to Witold Pilecki, one of the most famous "Cursed soldiers" and the only individual who willingly went to Auschwitz Camp. Pilecki revealed no sensitive information and was executed on May 25, 1948 at Mokotów Prison by Sergeant Piotr Śmietański, the "Butcher".

Józef Różański was arrested in 1953 – at the end of the Stalinist period in Poland – and charged with torturing innocent prisoners, including Polish United Workers' Party members. He was sentenced to 5 years in prison on 23 December 1955. In July 1956, the Supreme Court reopened his case due to improprieties discovered in the original investigation. On 11 November 1957 (charged along with co-defendant Anatol Fejgin), he was sentenced by the lower court to 15 years in prison, which was reduced to 14 years on appeal. Różański was released from prison in October 1964, having served 11 years. He died of cancer on 21 August 1981, and was buried at the Jewish Cemetery in Warsaw.

Różański was a brother of Jerzy Borejsza.

== Awards and decorations ==
- Order of the Cross of Grunwald, 2nd Class (13 December 1945)
- Order of the Cross of Grunwald, 3rd Class (10 October 1945)
- Officer's Cross of the Order of Polonia Restituta
- Knight's Cross of the Order of Polonia Restituta
- Golden Cross of Merit

== Notes and references ==
- Barbara Fijałkowska, Borejsza i Różański. Przyczynek do dziejów stalinizmu w Polsce, Olsztyn 1995. ISBN 83-85513-49-3, pp. 260, 203, 210, 216-223.
- AIPN, 0193/7094, Akta osobowe Józefa Różańskiego, k. 5.
- Zdzisław Uniszewski. Józef Różański. "Karta". 31 (2000).
- Stanisław Marat, Józef Snopkiewicz: Ludzie bezpieki: Dokumentacja czasu bezprawia. Warszawa: Alfa, 1990. ISBN 978-83-7001-361-5.
- (in Polish) "Curriculum vitae" written by Józef Różański himself on 7 September 1944, for the Ministry of Public Security of Poland
- Aldona Zaorska, Sąsiedzi. Najbardziej okrutni oprawcy polskich patriotów, Warszawa 2012, ISBN 978-83-932704-4-6.
