= History of European Jews in the Middle Ages =

History of European Jews in the Middle Ages covers Jewish history in Europe in the period from the 5th to the 15th century. Jews had been present in Europe since antiquity and experienced during that time, as well as during the early Middle Ages, a gradual diaspora shifting from the Levant to Europe. These Jewish individuals settled primarily in the regions of Central Europe dominated by the Holy Roman Empire and Southern Europe dominated by various Iberian kingdoms. As with Christianity, the Middle Ages were a period in which Judaism became mostly overshadowed by Islam in the Middle East, and an increasingly influential part of the socio-cultural and intellectual landscape of Europe.

The status of Jews in Christian Europe was defined by St Augustine's witness theology and Roman law. This allowed Jews to live relatively safely in a Christian society and even enjoy a certain degree of religious toleration up to the twelfth century. The Jews who immigrated to Iberia, and their descendants comprise the Sephardic Jews, while those who immigrated to the German Rhineland and France comprise the Ashkenazi Jews. The situation in Western Europe began to change at the end of the eleventh century with the start of the Crusades and the charge of Blood libel, which resulted often in pogroms though Church authorities and rulers often issued protection letters such as Sicut Judaeis. By the thirteenth century, Augustine's witness theory had eroded so that Jewish presence was often not tolerated anymore and Jews were expelled from many lands. The later Middle Ages saw stronger persecutions and forced conversions during the Black Death. By the end of the Middle Ages, most of Western Europe had expelled all its Jews while Poland had become the heartland of the Ashkenaz Jews.

With the end of the medieval age, a similar phenomenon was to repeat itself in Spain and Portugal, the Italian peninsula, and throughout most German towns and principalities in German-speaking lands in the sixteenth century. As a result, many Jews migrated to Eastern Europe, with large Yiddish speaking populations expanding over the next several centuries. By the 17th century a trickle back process began, with reverse migration back to central and western Europe, following pogroms in Ukraine (1648–1649).

== Early Middle Ages (500–1000) ==
=== Background ===
Many Jewish communities in Europe date back to antiquity. After 380s, when the emperors instituted Christianity as the state religion in the Roman Empire, they also passed several laws that limited the rights of heretics, pagans and also Jews, though Judaism remained a religio licita. The Theodosian Code, a compilation of imperial constitutions from the reign of Constantine I (272–337) to Theodosius II (401–450) that were (re-)issued as laws in 438, provided a blueprint for how Jews should be treated in a Christian society. As such, it included both restrictions (such as forbidding Jews to proselytise or have Christian slaves, exclude them from certain public offices or threatening the curtailment of privileges if Jews insulted Christians) as well as providing them protective basic rights (such as affirming their citizenship, outlawing attacks on synagogues, granting them due legal process and prohibiting arbitrary cancellation of their rights).

The papacy insisted on the implementation of the Theodosian Code from the fifth century onwards and combined it with the teachings of St Augustine to justify the continuation of a Jewish presence within Christianity. Augustine argued that because the Jews were unknowing witnesses to Christ spared by God, they must be protected. As they accepted the Old Testament, this was a disinterested testimony to the truth and historical basis of biblical Christological prophecy and as such Jews were living witnesses to the divine origin of Scripture. According to Augustine, Christians should encourage the presence of Jews amongst their midst as well as the continued observance of Jewish rites; as such, he placed little emphasis on evangelising Jews. Augustine's teachings were brought together with theology by Paul and the existing Roman law into Church doctrine by pope Gregory the Great. In a letter to the bishop of Naples he explained that just as Jews were forbidden from pursuing more freedom than the laws permitted so should Christians be forbidden to infringe the rights that Jews had. The letter, starting with the phrase Sicut Judaeis (Just as the Jews), became later known as Constitutio pro Judaeis and was re-issued by later popes in response to persecutions and appeals from Jews for protection. Most importantly, Pope Gregory insisted that Jews should not be forced to convert or physically harmed. Augustine's teaching and the Church protection allowed the Jews of Europe to live relatively safe and even enjoy a certain measure of religious tolerance up to the twelfth century.

=== Italy ===
The majority of archaeological and epigraphical evidence of the Jews in Late Ancient Rome lies in funerary sites, making it difficult to uncover a historical picture of their daily lives or their interactions with outsiders. Their fate in each particular country depended on the changing political conditions. In Italy (see History of the Jews in Italy) they experienced difficult days during the wars waged by the Heruli, Rugii, Ostrogoths, and Lombards. The severe laws of the Roman emperors were, in general, more mildly administered than elsewhere; the Arian confession, of which the Germanic conquerors of Italy were adherents, was characterized by its tolerance.

=== Germany ===
Jewish migration from Roman Italy is considered the most likely source of the first Jews within German territory, but there are multiple theories present in the scholarship currently available. While the date of the first settlement of Jews in the regions which the Romans called Germania Superior, Germania Inferior, and Magna Germania is not known, the first authentic documents relating to a large and well-organized Jewish community in these regions date from 321 and refers to Cologne on the Rhine. These documents stated that Jews could be called to the Curia and owed taxes to Rome, and that Jewish religious leaders were exempt from curial service, signalling that a uniquely Jewish community, prosperous enough to be taxed, had existed in Cologne for some time. During the Carolingian period, Jews had a vital function as importers of goods from the East, and their laws and customs were generally tolerated, although they were not allowed to proselytize to Christians. It was during this peaceful time, that Jews from other communities emigrated to Francia in hopes of better treatment, notably members of the Persian House of Exilarchs, such as Isaac the Jew and Makhir of Narbonne came to Francia and with them, brought a large community of Persian Jews, who later assimilated to European customs. However, these peaceful relations would end with the beginning of the First Crusade and thousands of Jews in communities all along the Rhine were attacked and killed under the presumption that if they were going to attack enemies of the Christ in Jerusalem, they should attack "Christ's enemies" around them in Germany. In 1095, Henry IV of Germany granted the Jews favorable conditions and issued a charter to the Jews and a decree against forced baptism. Despite those difficulties, German Jews continued to practice, refine, and evolve their religious and social customs, including the development of the Yiddish language and an identity as Ashkenazi Jews.

=== Visigoth Spain ===
Jews had been present in Spain since early classical times and had prospered under the Roman and - to a certain extent - also the Byzantine Empire. After the decline of the Roman Empire, the Visigoths controlled large portions of former Roman territory, including southwestern Gaul until 507, and much of the Iberian peninsula until 711. At the start, Jewish communities generally flourished under Visigothic rule in both Gaul and Spain.

The position of Jews became regulated under the Breviary of Alaric. which was essentially a simplification of the Theodosian Code and did not substantially change their status. Published in 506, it decreed that Jews were to be considered Roman citizens and were to live under Roman law. They were given freedom to practice their religion, although efforts to convert pagans and Christians to Judaism were to be curtailed. Alaric also decreed that the judicial autonomy of the Jewish communities was to be respected. After Sisebut took the Visigothic throne in 612, these privileges were revoked, and suppression of the Jewish religion became policy, resulting in attempted forced conversion. There was a brief respite in 640, when Chindasuinth usurped the throne and pursued a pro-Jewish policy. His son Recceswinth, to the contrary, denounced Jews as "polluting the soil of Spain" in 653, and enacted a new code meant to make it impossible for Jews to remain in Spain. These laws proved to be unpopular, and were resisted by both Jews and Christians alike. Therefore, when the Muslims invaded Spain, Jews often helped them in ending Visigothic rule and garrisoned captured cities.

=== Activities ===
The first historical testimonies on the activities of the Jews show that most were engaged in agriculture, and a minority were engaged in trade, as well as in handicrafts. In the South, "particularly in south Italy and Greece - the Jewish communities had almost a monopoly of dyeing and silk-weaving". Some were involved in qualified services such as interpreters, translators, and medical practitioners.

European Jews were involved in the intellectual and cultural spheres of medieval society : "Jews contributed to medicine, astrology, mathematics as well as to the arts, literature and music."

Many Jewish women, in comparison to Gentile women, worked alongside their male counterparts. These Jewish women relied on Christian women as wet nurses and caretakers of their young, which brought about some concern from their male partners regarding if their offspring would be truly "Jewish" and not impacted by these intimate relationships with Christians. It was common for many regions of Medieval Europe to have communal ovens that Jewish and Christian women would use in tandem. There is evidence of written correspondence between Jewish males and rabbinical authorities discussing whether or not certain intimate interactions were in accordance with Jewish law; it seems that many of the conclusions were that it should be left to the discretion of the women.

=== Church laws in the Early Middle Ages ===
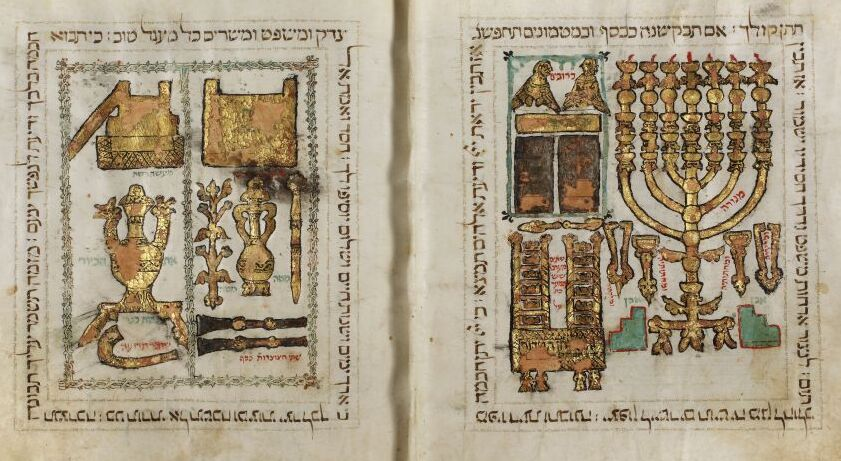
11th century mishnah codex from Italy, Biblioteca Palatina, Parma

Conversions of Jews to Christianity, whether forced or voluntary, during the medieval period were an integral part of the life of Jewish communities in the medieval period. The pressures to convert, other than compulsory baptism to save one's life, could be theological, economic and intellectual. Voluntary conversion by such renegades (meshummadim) was motivated by a number of facts: a change of belief could account for the conversion, as could the desire to marry a Christian or to escape from the restrictions on life as a Jew, or to regain a livelihood or home. Such conversions proved particularly devastating for the English and Spanish Jewish communities.

By the 10th century, most of Europe was under the rule of Christian monarchs who made Christianity the official religion of their realms. In the Roman or Byzantine Empire, Christianity had been the state church since the Edict of Thessalonica in 380 AD. A privileged niche for Jews in the new order nonetheless remained. The Church forbade Christians from charging interest to fellow Christians; based upon the scripture Deuteronomy 23:20-21. With Christians viewing the Jewish population as foreigners (and vice versa) the ability to loan money with interest became an essential part of the Economy and synonymous with the various Jewish populations throughout medieval Europe. While this status did not always lead to peaceful conditions for the Jewish people, they were the most compatible non-Christians for the position due to their shared devotion to the same Abrahamic God that the Christians worshiped. While many Jews rose to prominence in these times, Judaism was mostly practiced in private to avoid persecution. The descendants of the survivors of this period, the Ashkenazi Jews, still commemorate some of the more memorable tragedies of this period in their liturgy.

In other parts of western Europe, Jews who wished to remain true to the faith of their fathers were protected by the Church itself from compulsory conversion. There was no change in this policy even later, when the Pope called for the support of the Carolingians in protecting his ideal kingdom with their temporal power. Charlemagne, moreover, was glad to use the Church for the purpose of welding together the loosely connected elements of his kingdom when he transformed part of the old Roman empire into a new Christian one, and united under the imperial crown all the German races at that time. Years after his death, in 843, his empire fell apart, and the rulers of Italy, France, and Germany were more attentive to the Church's desires in the making of laws dealing with the Jews.

In the wake of a narrow military defeat over Muslim forces, Leo III of Constantinople decided his nation's weakness lay in its heterogeneous population and began the forcible conversion of the Jews, as well as the New Christians. However, some were able to secretly continue their Jewish practices. In 1210, a group of 300 French and English rabbis made aliyah and settled in Israel.

== High Middle Ages (1000–1350) ==
Up until the twelfth century, Jews and Christians in Latin Christendom lived in relative peace with one another thanks to Augustine's theological justification. The situation started changing with the begin of the First Crusade, when the call for the European kingdoms to unite under the cross raised anew the question of the status of the Jews, combined with popular resentment of the practice of moneylending by Jews and religious fervour stoked by stories of illtreatment of Christians in the Holy Land by Muslims and Jews. In response to the persecutions, the papacy started reissuing pope Gregory's letter Sicut Judaeis as protection.

"Officially, the medieval Catholic church never advocated the expulsion of all the Jews from Christendom, or repudiated Augustine's doctrine of Jewish witness... Still, late medieval Christendom frequently ignored its mandates..."

=== The Crusades ===
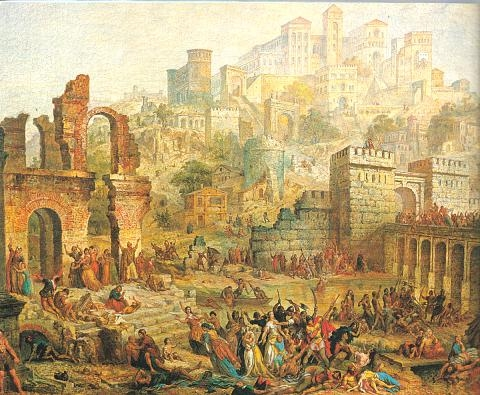
Massacre of the Jews of Metz during the First Crusade, by the 19th-century painter Auguste Migette

The trials the Jews periodically endured in the various Christian West kingdoms echoed the catastrophes that occurred during Crusades. In the First Crusade (1096) flourishing communities on the Rhine and the Danube were utterly destroyed. Furthermore, there were also attacks on the Jews that lived in cities along the Rhine. Prior to these attacks, many Jews were seen as integral members of society despite religious differences. Many Jews worked in the money lending trade. Their services allowed for societies to function financially. In one case Jewish moneylenders were responsible for financially maintaining a monastery. Without these loans the monastery would have been unable to survive. However, this fiscal responsibility that the Jews carried might have caused tensions amongst the middle and upper class. These sects of society would not have approved of the power that the Jewish communities held. At this point there were no strictly Jewish communities. Jews were not concentrated in one area, rather their presence was spread over a larger geographical region. Oftentimes a few families lived immersed in a predominantly Christian settlement. The Jewish families were comfortable in this setting and functioned successfully. In some circumstances, Christians both accepted and welcomed the Jews. When violence against the Jewish people began to occur some Christians attempted to protect their fellow neighbors. In the town of Cologne, Jews fled to the homes of their Christian neighbors where they were given shelter. Christians discussed the topic of conversion with the Jews. There existed a theory that if the Jews were to convert to Christianity then they would no longer be the target of such violence. There were discussions regarding conversion to Christianity. Religious leaders including Bishops and Archbishops alike tried to spare the Jews from violence. One Archbishop from Mainz went so far as to offer monetary bribes to protect Jewish families. These Jews did not want relief from the exile that occurred hundreds of years prior, moreover they saw the towns in which they had immigrated to as their homes. They were well received members of the community. In the Second Crusade (1147) the Jews in France suffered especially under Louis VII. Philip Augustus treated them with exceptional severity. The Jews were also subjected to attacks by the Shepherds' Crusades of 1251 and 1320.

==== Protection attempts by Christians during the First Crusade ====
During the First Crusade of 1096, there are documented accounts of Christian attempts to protect Jews from their violent attackers. The first of such attempts was carried out by the archbishop of Mainz, located in the Rhineland of Germany, in response to local Jews who had organized a bribe in return for the archbishop's protection. Although the archbishop at first accepted the bribe, community leaders persuaded him to protect the Jews' money instead of taking it, while still offering them refuge in his quarters. Ultimately, the archbishop's rescue attempt was unsuccessful. Crusaders, aided by some townspeople, eventually stormed the archbishop's chamber and slaughtered the Jews hiding there.

In another instance, the bishop of Trier offered to keep Jews safe from Crusaders in his palace; however, local intimidation eventually forced him to abandon those whom he had previously aided. Because the bishop had no ancestry or allies in Trier, he felt that he could not muster the political power needed to carry out a successful resistance without the support of the townspeople. Instead, he offered the Jews an ultimatum: convert to Christianity or leave the palace. When doing so, he remarked, “You cannot be saved—Your God does not wish to save you now as he did in earlier days.”

In Cologne, Jews were protected by local gentiles after violence had broken out at the beginning of Shavuot, a Jewish holiday. During the two days of Shavuot, one Jewish woman was killed by Crusaders while venturing to the safety of a Christian neighbor's home, where her husband was waiting for her. However, the vast majority of Jews in Cologne survived Shavuot because local Christians had reached out and offered their homes as a means of asylum from the Crusaders.

=== Sicut Judaeis ===
Sicut Judaeis (the "Constitution for the Jews") was the official position of the papacy regarding Jews throughout the Middle Ages and later. The first bull was issued in about 1120 by Calixtus II, intended to protect Jews who were suffering during the First Crusade, and was reaffirmed by many popes, even until the 15th century. The bull forbade, besides other things, Christians from forcing Jews to convert, or to harm them, or to take their property, or to disturb the celebration of their festivals, or to interfere with their cemeteries, on pain of excommunication. Although the Jews and Christians of Rome were organized into distinct communities, the boundaries of which were not only reinforced on a daily basis but were regularly performed on ceremonial occasions such as the papal adventus, Jews and Christians experienced unusually robust cultural and social interactions, especially as the Jews increasingly aligned themselves with the protective power of the papacy.

With the increase of the prestige of the papacy and of its power in the twelfth and thirteenth century, the popes also sought to regulate more Jewish-Christian interactions. Pope Innocent III, who was particularly concerned with protecting Christian society from both external enemies such as the Muslims and internal enemies such as heretics, viewed the Jews as not very trustworthy. The Fourth Lateran Council, convened by him in 1215, exceeded previous church councils in its regulations on Jews. Similar to existing Muslim regulation, it decreed that Jews be differentiated from others by their type of clothing or marking to avoid intercourse between Jews and Christians. Innocent nevertheless held the Augustinian position that Jews should be protected and thus stipulated that the distintinctive clothing should not result in harm for them. However, the rule likely resulted in discrimination of all kind. Jews were sometimes required to wear a yellow badge or a pointed hat.

=== England ===
In Anglo-Saxon Britain, there had been few, if any, Jews, who mostly came with other Flemish migrants in the wake of the Norman conquest. They reached a population of estimated 5,000, around half the population lived in London while the rest moved to York, Winchester, Lincoln, Canterbury, Northampton and Oxford. In 1144, the first instance of the charge of ritual murder occurred in Norwich, with at least more incidents happening in the rest of the twelfth century. The launch of the Third Crusade was also accompanied by the charges of ritual murder and pogroms.

In 1229, King Henry III of England forced Jews to pay half the value of their property in taxes, following burning of the Talmud in Paris and the Tartars' capture of Jerusalem. During the Fatimid period, many Jewish officials served in the regime. King Henry III of England ordered Jewish worship in synagogue to be held quietly so that Christians passing by would not have to hear it, giving an order that Jews may not employ Christian nurses or maids, nor may any Jew prevent another from converting to Christianity. A few years later, French King Louis IX expelled the Jews from France, ending the Tosaphists period. Most Jews went to Germany and further east.

At the end of the thirteenth century, the Jews were no longer profitable to English King Edward I. In 1275, he passed a law making usury illegal and later linking it to blasphemy. In the 1280s, in order to pay the ransom for his cousin Charles of Salerno, Edward confiscated the property of the Jews in his lands in Gascony before expelling them in 1289. The next year, claiming widespread evasion of his law against usury, Edward I also grabbed all assets of the English Jews and expelled them from England. By that time, only 2,500 Jews were left who produced a total of £9,100.

=== Later immigration to Germany ===
In 1267, the Vienna city council forced Jews to wear the Jewish hat, in addition to the yellow badge. Later in the century, a blood libel in Munich resulted in the deaths of 68 Jews, and an additional 180 Jews were burned alive at the synagogue, following another mob in Oberwesel, Germany.

In 1348, hundreds of Jews were burned and many were baptized in Basel. The city's Christian residents converted the synagogue into a church and destroyed the Jewish cemetery there. Pope Clement VI issued an edict repudiating the libel against Jews, saying that they too were suffering from the Plague. In 1385, German Emperor Wenceslaus arrested Jews living in the Swabian League, a group of free cities in Germany, and confiscated their books. Later, he expelled the Jews of Strassburg after a community debate.

Benedict XIII banned the study of the Talmud in any form, as institutions forced Christian sermons and tried to restrict Jewish life completely, and a few years later Pope Martin V favorably reinstated old privileges of the Jews. After more Jews were expelled from France, some remained in Provence until 1500. In 1422, Pope Martin V issued a bull reminding Christians that Christianity was derived from Judaism and warned the Friars not to incite against the Jews, but the Bull was withdrawn the following year. By the end of the 15th century, the Inquisition was established in Spain. Around 1500 Jews found relative security and a renewal of prosperity in present-day Poland.

=== France ===
Philip IV of France ordered all Jews expelled from France, with their property to be sold at public auction, and some 125,000 Jews were forced to leave. Similar to accusations made during the Black Plague, Jews were accused of encouraging lepers to poison Christian wells in France. An estimated five thousand Jews were killed before the king, Philip the Tall, admitted the Jews were innocent. Then, Charles IV expelled all French Jews without the one-year period he had promised them, as much of Europe blamed the Black Plague on the Jews and tortured them so they would confess that they poisoned the wells. Despite the pleas of innocence of Pope Clement VI, the accusations resulted in the destruction of over 60 large and 150 small Jewish communities.

=== Iberian Peninsula ===
At the end of the eleventh century, the Almoravides became the dominant Muslim power in Southern Spain who were more fanatic and violent than previous rulers. Iban Iashufin, the King of the Almoravides, captured Granada in 1090 and destroyed the Jewish community, as the survivors fled to Toledo. Under the Almoravids, though Jewish religious scholarship and poetry continued, Jews became increasingly marginalised and were pushed out of civil services. From that time onward, Jews were often safer in northern Spain under Christian rulers. The situation worsened under the Almohad Caliphate, who brought most of Muslim Spain under their control by 1172. They were intolerant towards both Christians and Jews and, similar to the Visigothic kings, forced Christians and Jews to choose between conversion or death. Many Jews fled the Muslim controlled portion of Iberia either to more tolerant Muslim countries such as Ayyubid Egypt and Syria or fled over the frontier into Christian Spain. Questioning the sincerity of those Jews that converted to Islam, the Caliph Yaqub al-Mansur still treated them as if they were dhimmis, not only limiting their civil rights but also having them wear distinguishing clothing consisting of blue-black garments, ludicrous caps and the shikla. By the end of the twelfth century, the Almohad persecutions had ended the flourishing Jewish settlements in Muslim Spain.

Through some of the Christian world, Jews enjoyed privileges at the hands of nobles and even kings that were almost equal to the local Christians. For example, in the Crown of Aragon, in 1241, King James of Aragon issued a decree that the Jewish community of Barcelona would be given the right to elect members of the Jewish community to police itself and investigate Jewish criminals and crimes within the Jewish community. Once the elected police force caught a criminal, they were given the right to impose fines (paid to the crown, not the Jewish community), banish them from the Jewish quarter, or even banish them entirely from the city of Barcelona. Further, these elected members were given the authority to judge cases between Jews in a court of law. In 1271, King James issued a similar decree with a sense of increased urgency which suggests that things had become volatile among the Jewish community, or that the perception of the Jewish community was overwhelmingly one of a state of chaos. This second decree also increased the rights of the council to whatever punishments they deem to be "convenient to the community," including any punishments that they deemed fit.

=== Jewish-Christian relations ===
The relations of Jews and Christians were fraught with tensions about the death of Jesus and the Christian perception of Jewish obstinacy in refusing to accept the only faith the Christians knew in the world. The pressure on Jews to accept Christianity was intense. Recent years have seen a debate among historians on the nature of Jewish-Christian relations in medieval Europe. Traditionally, historians focused on the trials Jews had to endure in this period. Christian violence towards Jews was rife, as were ritual murder accusations, expulsions, and extortion. However, recently historians have begun to show evidence of other relationships between Jews and Christians, suggesting Jews were more embedded into Christian society than was previously thought.

Since the time of the Middle Ages, the Catholic Church upheld the Constitutio pro Judæis (Formal Statement on the Jews), which stated:

We decree that no Christian shall use violence to force them to be baptized, so long as they are unwilling and refuse.…Without the judgment of the political authority of the land, no Christian shall presume to wound them or kill them or rob them of their money or change the good customs that they have thus far enjoyed in the place where they live."

Jonathan Elukin is one historian who thinks in this vein, as elucidated in his book Living Together, Living Apart. He shows that during the Crusades, some Jews were hidden and protected from being attacked by Christians. Some Jews worked in Christian villages. There were also several cases of conversion to Judaism as well as interfaith marriages. One such case was Jacob ben Sullam, a Christian looking to become a part of Jewish society. He chose to "slaughter [himself]" of his Christian identity in the hope of being accepted as a Jew in the Jewish community.

As Christians sought conversion to Judaism, a number of Jews similarly wanted to convert to Christianity. For example, Herman, a Jew who adopted Christianity to the degree that his family worried that he would reject his Jewish heritage completely. Herman's conversion startled the rabbis and made them fear losing other Jews to Christianity.

The close bonds between Jewish and Christian neighbors led to Jewish communities thriving in some Christian cities. Jews experienced economic security and prosperity in their communities, even while enduring constant threats of violence. Though strict constraints were placed on Jews in the thirteenth century by the French monarchy, Jews continued to experience a stable living situation. Although the French monarchy prohibited the creation of Jewish religious centers, friendly relations with Christians enabled them to build a synagogue in Béziers in 1278. After being expelled from certain areas in Europe, Jews regularly returned to their old places of residence, if they had previously experienced a prosperous life there.

Another such historian is Ivan Marcus. The section of his book Cultures of the Jews, "Jewish-Christian Symbiosis" deals with the relationship between Christians and Ashkenazi Jews. Marcus claims that the time is written off as a time of intolerance against Jews living in Europe. For Marcus times of persecution were rarities and few and far between. The two communities lived amongst each other and interacted socially on an everyday basis. They interacted at such a personal level both Christian and Jewish leaders thought that the other group would heavily influence their respective faiths. When persecution did occur however it was only the more drastic measures that stopped the close interactions between the two groups. Had the intense violence described in other sources been the standard for living condition of the Askkenazi Jews then they would not have survived the era let alone their culture which is the roots for many Jews today. During times of persecution against the Jews, chronicles show that Christian friends provided some of them aid and shelter. A chronicler tells a story of a Jewish woman who is given food and shelter for two days from a gentile acquaintance during a time of violence against the Jews during Shavuot. This gentile acquaintance is believed to be Christian. Also, the chronicles show that some Christians converted to Judaism during these times. Some converts even sacrificed themselves in order to show their loyalty to the Jewish community.

In England, many Jews worked and lived in small, mostly Christian towns. Historians interpret this as Jews feeling comfortable living and working in places surrounded by Christians. Another example some historians use to show Jewish attachment to their place in Western Christendom is the Jewish expulsion in France. After they were expelled in 1182, they returned in 1198.

Even after multiple expulsions and persecutions, some Jews still returned to their hometowns. Once they returned, many prospered. In spite of royal restrictions attempting to limit their success. They built new synagogues.

These examples are used by some historians to shine a light on a more positive relationship between the two religious groups. These historians believe that these stories of aid, neighborliness, and prosperity are more notable and significant than previously recognized.

Scattered violence toward Jews occasionally took place during riots led by mobs, local leaders, and lower level clergy without the support of church leaders who generally followed Augustine's teachings.

However, some historians do not agree with this view of history. Historian Daniel J. Lasker does not see the relationship of Christians and Jews in the same light. He contends that the expulsions Jews in Spain faced in 1492 were the product of the revolts seen a century earlier in 1391. Even though the relationship might have been positive, it ended on a negative note. The expulsions of the Jews in various regions is that ending, with a wide range of reasons behind them not just religion. The reason for the Jews returning to regions they were expelled from was not acceptance as to what happened, but a sense of comfort and familiarity. While Lasker acknowledges that Jews and Christians as having some positive relationships he does not want to write off the tension of the area.

In the High Middle Ages, many European Jews were specialized as merchants, money-lenders or artisans, as they were largely excluded from craft guilds and barred from owning land. In contrast, Julie L. Mell insists on the fact that much of the Jewish population was left at the lower end of the urban economic scale.

=== Accusations of ritual murder, blood libel and host desecration ===
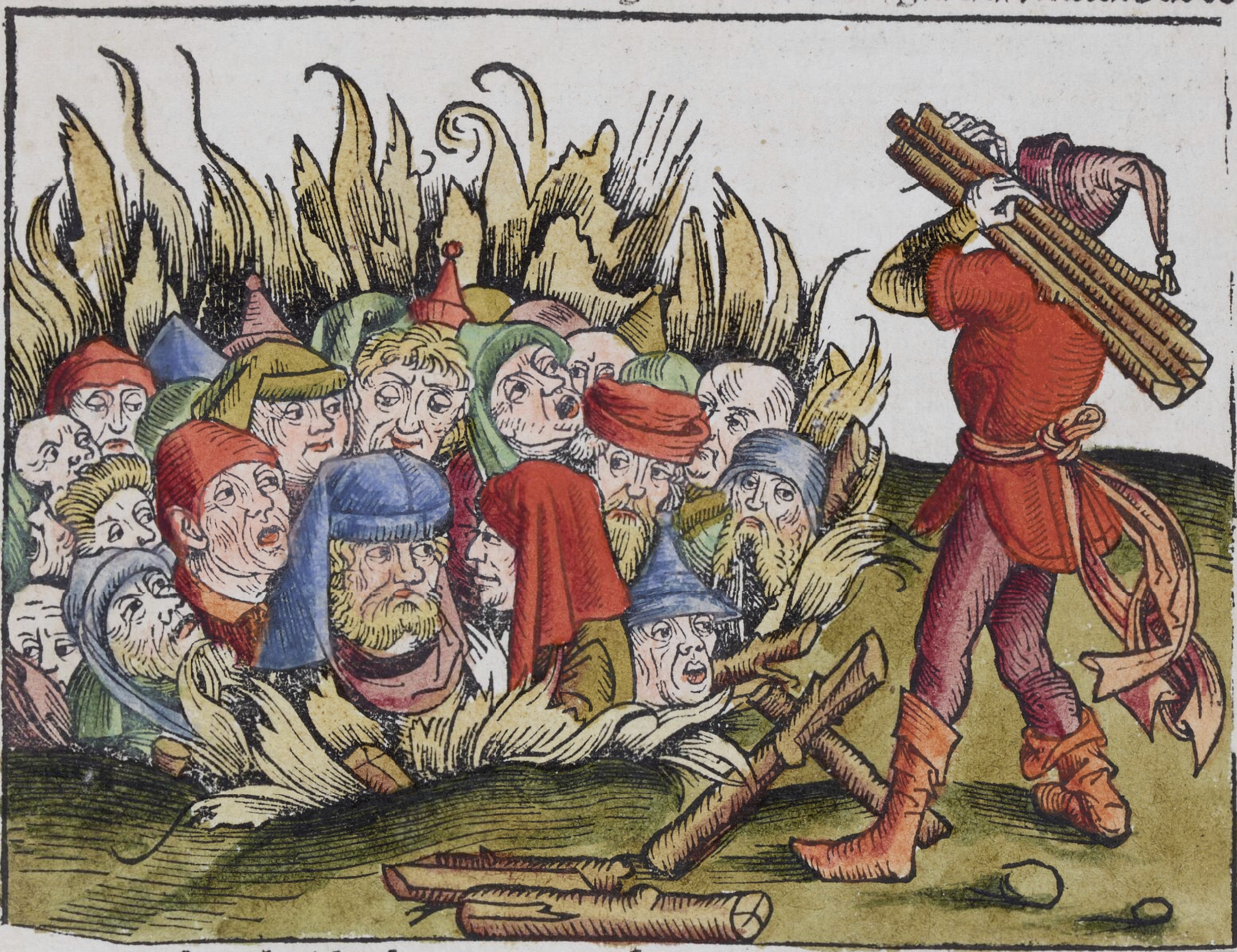
A colored woodcut in Liber Chronicarum (1493) depicts Jews being burned alive in Deggendorf.

Although the first known mention of blood libel is found in the writings of Apion (30–20 BCE to 45 or 48 CE), who claimed that the Jews sacrificed Greeks in the Temple of Jerusalem, no other mention is recorded until the 12th century, when blood libels began to proliferate. Though Church tradition had traditionally considered the Jews blind to the Truth of Christianity, some Christians, based on their readings of Bible passages, thought the Jews had killed Jesus knowing he was the Messiah. This fuelled the popular belief that those who had spilled God's blood knowingly would engage in ritual murder, a charge that began being levelled against Jews from the mid-twelfth century onwards.

The first instance took place in 1144 in Norwich, when the local Jews were accused of murdering a young boy called William. Initially, the local sheriff refused to let them stand trial and hustled them into protection of Norwich castle as the Jews were king's property and the local church authorities were sceptical towards the story. Two years later, however, a monk in favour of the story was made bishop and together with the false story of a Jewish convert the Jews were blamed again. Additionally complicating the matter was that William and other alleged victims of ritual murder were often bestowed sainthood by popular belief (at this time, the Catholic Church did not control the process of declaring someone a saint).

Jews were frequently accused of ritual murder and of using human blood (especially, the blood of Christian children) to make matzah. The most influential and widely-known of these is Little Saint Hugh of Lincoln (d. 1255 and written about in Chaucer's "Canterbury Tales") and Simon of Trent (d. 1475). It gained particular currency because of the intervention of Henry III of England, who ordered the death of the Coping, the first to 'confess', and a further 91 Jews to be arrested, leading to 18 being executed. Nevertheless, the rest were released despite their conviction, after monks and his brother Richard interceded.

The first instance of ritual murder accusation in France occurred in 1171 in the town of Blois. The story follows a Jewish man and a Christian servant watering their horses at the same bend in a river. The Jewish man accidentally scared the Christian's horse with the white corner of his undershirt and the servant rode away, upset about the frightened beast, and told his master he saw the Jew throw a child in the river. The Christian master, who hated Jews, took this opportunity and had the Jew unlawfully accused of murder. The Christians took the man, along with the Jews who had tried to free him, beating and torturing them in the effort that they would abandon their religion. To no avail, the Jews were burned alive.

In some cases, the authorities spoke against the accusations, for example Pope Innocent III wrote in 1199:

No Christian shall do the Jews any personal injury, except in executing the judgments of a judge, or deprive them of their possessions, or change the rights and privileges which they have been accustomed to have. During the celebration of their festivals, no one shall disturb them by beating them with clubs or by throwing stones at them. No one shall compel them to render any services except those which they have been accustomed to render. And to prevent the baseness and avarice of wicked men we forbid anyone to deface or damage their cemeteries or to extort money from them by threatening to exhume the bodies of their dead.

The charge was circulated that they wished to dishonor the Host, which Roman Catholics believe is the body of Jesus Christ.

== Later Middle Ages (1350–1550) ==
Map of the expulsions of Jews from European territories between 1100 and 1600

In the later Middle Ages, the quality of life for Jewish communities experienced significant deterioration due to a combination of social, political, and economic factors, including increased persecution, restrictions on their rights, and economic hardships. The Black Death, which killed a significant proportion of European population, was blamed on the Jews and led to new persecutions. Further, the period saw renewed expulsion, such as in Spain and parts of Germany so that most of Western Europe was emtpied of Jews. Some of these found refuge in eastern Europe and Italy, including the Papal States.

=== Black Death ===
The "Black Death" pandemic swept through Asia and the Middle East and into Europe between 1347 and 1350, and is believed to have killed between a quarter and half of Europe's population. Popular opinion blamed the Jews for the plague by poisoning the wells, and violence directed at them erupted throughout the continent. (Note: Jean de Venette, prior of a Carmelite convent in Paris in the 14th century, wrote: As a result of this theory of infected water and air as the source of the plague the Jews were suddenly and violently charged with infecting wells and water and corrupting the air. The whole world rose up against them cruelly on this account. In Germany and other parts of the world where Jews lived, they were massacred and slaughtered by Christians, and many thousands were burned everywhere, indiscriminately.) In defence of the Jews, Pope Clement VI issued two papal bulls in 1348 (6 July and 26 September), the latter named Quamvis Perfidiam, which condemned the violence and said those who blamed the plague on the Jews had been "seduced by that liar, the Devil." He went on to emphasise that the Jews were suffering just as badly as everyone else. He urged clergy to take action to protect Jews and offered them papal protection in the city of Avignon. Though also Christian rulers issued similar statements, this led to the biggest wave in antisemitic violence since the Rhineland massacres.

=== France ===
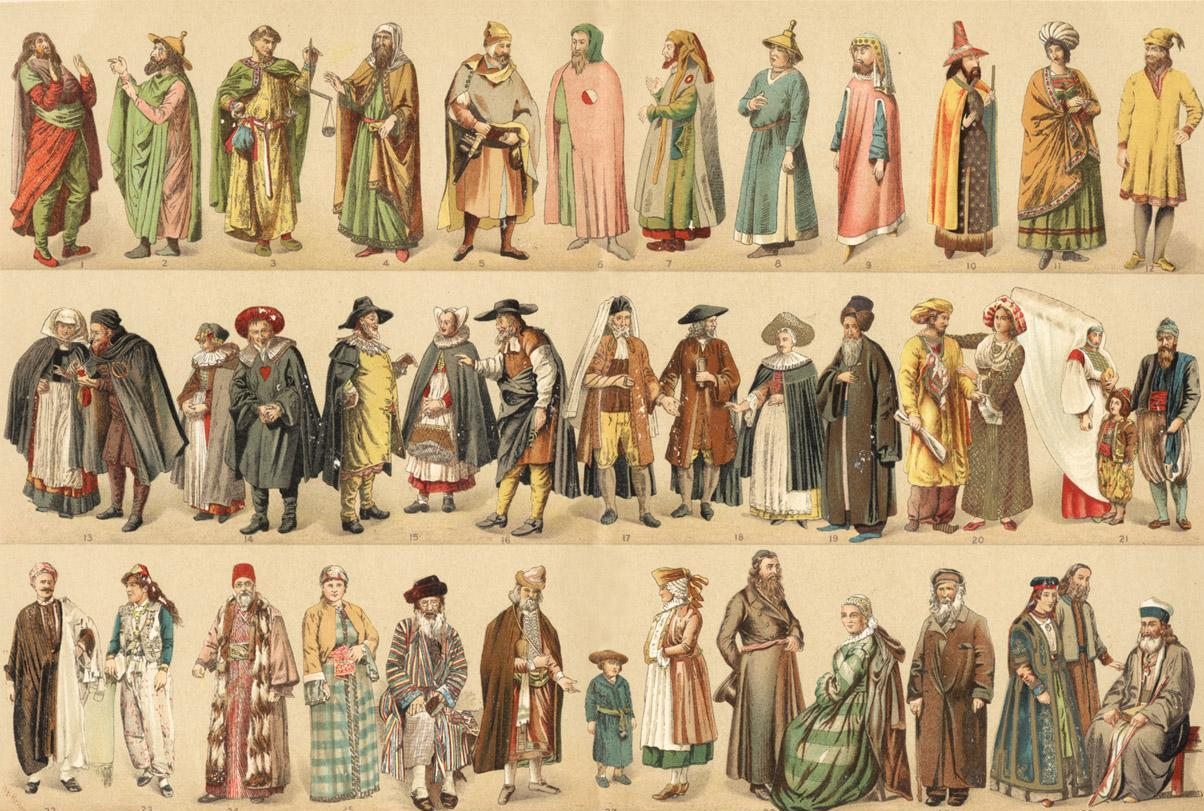
1906 Jewish Encyclopedia illustration of medieval French Jews

Jews enjoyed a time of prosperity until the end of the 15th century in Provence when they were expelled from the area. There were no significant legal distinctions between the citizenship rights of Jews and Christians under the statutes of Marseilles prior to their expulsion. Jews were officially given the same citizenship rights in Saint-Remy-de-Provence in 1345 and by 1467 in Tarascon. Comtat Venaissin and Avignon, both being papal principalities, witnessed an era of peace for Jewish communities who were established there without expulsions being a part of their lives. The Jews of Provence received official protection but this was because of Jewish usefulness for the royalty. This did not, however, preclude anti-Jewish incidences which precipitated voluntary Jewish departures. Once Provence was annexed by the Kingdom of France in 1481, the flourishing Jewish residents found themselves expelled by 1498.

=== Italy ===
The fate of Italian Jews varied depending on the region and time period, with periods of toleration giving way to forced migrations and conversions, often driven by monarchs or the Church. The papacy and its toleration figured prominently. Italian dukes, such as in Milan, in the Renaissance era accorded protections to resident Jewish communities for a range of political or economic reasons. However, the local authorities rigorously attempted to impose Jewish badges. Franciscan friars exerted pressure on the dukes to enforce the wearing of yellow badges by Jews which the dukes resisted. Taxation records reveal a great quantity of Jewish contribution to the duchy of Milan's finances. The Jewish tax contribution in the state budget was 0.2% in 1460. By 1480 this had increased to 1%. In 1482, 6% of the extraordinary tax came from Jewish communities. This evidence indicates the wealth of the Jewish population and also indicates a possible population boom. However, Jews lost support from Ludovico Sforza on the eve of the Italian wars.

=== Spain ===
After the end of the Visigothic kingdom and as late as the early fourteenth century, Spain was the safest Latin territory for Jews. Spanish Jews, called Sephardic Jews according to a corruption of the old name of Spain, created their own Judaeo-Spanish language, called Ladino or Judezmo. They were educated, prosperous, literary, not over-strict following the liberal codification of Joseph Karo. After the Black Death, however, the situation deteriorated quickly as the blood libel and other antisemitic tales became more widely believed by the population. This resulted in the antisemitic riots of 1378 in Seville and of the big pogrom of 1391. In 1391, Ferrand Martinez, archdeacon of Ecija, began a campaign against Spanish Jewry, killing over 10,000 and destroying the Jewish quarter in Barcelona. The campaign quickly spread throughout Spain, except for Granada, and destroyed Jewish communities in Valencia and Palma De Majorca. King Pedro I ordered Spain not to harm the remaining Jews and that synagogues not be converted into churches. He then announced his compliance with the Bull of Pope Boniface IX, protecting Jews from baptism. He extended this edict to Spanish Jewish refugees.

There was no progress towards inter faith harmony in 15th century Spain. Mark Meyerson notes the silence of 15th century records on the Jewish-Christian relations in Morvedre. In that town Jews constituted a quarter of the urban population and had a significant contribution to the area's economy. The Jewish situation varied across Spain. The Jewish quarter of Cervera was sacked by Catalan troops and they warned Jews in Tarrega of the same fate. These events set off the emigration of affluent converso households from Barcelona. The situation was less severe for Jews and conversos in Aragon. In the kingdom of Aragon the strong Jewish ties to the monarchy, in the form of political support, revenue supplies and assistance, ensured their relatively safer position. The introduction of credit mechanisms by the Jews in Morvedre facilitated the Jewish revival in the region and granted the Jews dominance in the kingdom's credit markets. The Jewish community as a whole generally functioned with economic success. The Jewish economic activity was diversified not only in the kingdom of Valencia but also in the kingdom of Aragon. Jews continued lending sums to non-Jews and Jewish usury was no longer contested in public, and religious relations remained stable and unmarred by violent activity.

Many sought refuge in baptism, but Spanish Jews soon found out that they could not evade antisemitic hostility through conversion. The Spanish population frequently doubted the sincerity of the baptism of the new converts, who were often called conversos or marranos, and perceived of them as either economic threat (as the converts did not suffer from the legal disabilities imposed on Jews) or as secret Jews, thus as a potential, hidden subversive threat. Pressure on the Jews in Spain increased under the anti-Jewish policy of the Queen Isabelle of Castile and king Ferdinand of Aragon, whose marriage had united Spain. In reaction to the perceived threat of hidden Jews new laws effecting the newly converts were introduced and the Spanish inquisition was instituted to find out and punish Jews that secretly still practiced Jews.

After the fall of Granada, the last Moorish kingdom in Spain, more Jewish communities were added to the already imporverished and persecuted Spanish Jews. Driven by the intention to end contact between the conversos and Jews as well as their followers anxious to loot, Isabella and Ferdinand signed on 31 March 1492 an Edict of Expulsion, physically driving out any Jews from Spain that did not accept immediate conversion. At the time, there were still around 200,000 Jews, of which a very large number, including the senior Rabbi and most of the leading families chose to convert. Around 100,000 sought refuge in Portugal, from where they were expelled four years later, (Note: Many Sephardis expelled from Portugal went to France and north-western Europe. The mother of Michel de Montaigne, Antoinette Louppes, was a direct descendant of Spanish Jews.) 50,000 crossed into North Africa or went by ship to the Ottoman Empire. The expulsion was an accomplished fact by July 1492.

=== Expulsions ===
The late Middle Ages saw several expulsion of Jews, such as out of France in 1394, out of numerous districts of Germany, Italy, as well as later Spain and the kingdom of Navarre. Often one expulsion provoked another, as expelled Jews moved into territories which already housed more Jews than their rulers wanted. Often, these Jews moved into less developed territories where their skills were sought such as Austria, Bohemia, Moravia and Silesia before moving further on into Poland and Lithuania. Here, the Jews were in general a boon to the economic progress and allowed access to all occupations, including royal agents and tax collectors. Casimir the Great (1333–1370) renewed the Statute of Kalisz, a charter of rights for the Jews that had been first granted by duke Bolesław the Pious in 1264. Though there were also some anti-Jewish riots in Poland and they were expelled temporarily from parts of Poland and Lithuania, by the year 1500 Poland was regarded the safest territory for Jews and soon became the Ashkenazi homeland. Here they found a sure refuge under benevolent rulers and acquired a certain prosperity, in the enjoyment of which the study of the Talmud was followed with renewed vigor. Together with their faith, they took with them the German language and customs, which they then cultivated in a Slavic environment with unexampled faithfulness for centuries.

== Enlightenment ==
According to most scholars, the Middle Ages ended around 1500–1550, giving way to the early modern period (c. 1550–1789). The Enlightenment appeared at the end of the early modern period, and was characterized by a set of values and ideas that completely opposed the previous medieval age. The Enlightened monarch was an important product of the era; he or she strove to create a cultured, modern state populated by effective subjects, and often began the journey to this state by improving the living conditions of the poor and minorities, which included Jews in most countries. The monarchs tried to include their Jewish subjects in mainstream society, reducing restrictions and passing more general laws that applied to all, regardless of religion.

A Jewish Enlightenment occurred alongside the broader European one, originally appearing at the end of the eighteenth century. Known as Haskalah, it would re-emerge in the 1820s and lasted for the better part of the century. A form of "critical rationalism" inspired by the European Enlightenment, Haskalah focused on reform in two specific areas: stimulating an internal rebirth of culture, and better preparing and training Jews to exist in a christocentric world. It did not force its adherents to sacrifice one identity for the other, allowing them to simultaneously be Jewish and emulate their Gentile contemporaries. One of the most important effects of the Enlightenment was emancipation for Jews. Beginning in Napoleonic France after the Revolution-which was directly inspired by the Enlightenment-Jews received full rights and became equal citizens. This trend spread eastward across the continent, lasting until 1917, when Russian Jews were finally emancipated during the first Russian Revolution.

== See also ==
- Medieval antisemitism
- Golden age of Jewish culture in the Iberian Peninsula
- History of the Jews in England (1066–1290)
- Statute of Kalisz
- History of the Jews under Muslim rule
- History of the Jews in the Ottoman Empire
- History of the Jews in Poland before the 18th century

== Bibliography ==
- Abulafia, Anna (3 December 2001). "Introduction". In Abulafia (ed.). Religious Violence Between Christians and Jews: Medieval Roots, Modern Perspectives. Springer. ISBN 978-1-4039-1382-1.
- Ben Yoḥanan, Karma (2022). Jacob's Younger Brother: Christian-Jewish Relations after Vatican II. Cambridge, MA: Harvard University Press. ISBN 9780674276352.
- Cohen, Mark R. (3 December 2001). "Anti-Jewish Violence and the Place of the Jews in Christendom and in Islam: a Paradigm". In Abulafia, A. (ed.). Religious Violence Between Christians and Jews: Medieval Roots, Modern Perspectives. Springer. ISBN 978-1-4039-1382-1.
- Elukin, Jonathan (10 January 2009). Living Together, Living Apart: Rethinking Jewish-Christian Relations in the Middle Ages. Princeton University Press. ISBN 978-1-4008-2769-5.
- Flannery, Edward H. (1985). The Anguish of the Jews: Twenty-three Centuries of Antisemitism. Paulist Press. ISBN 978-0-8091-4324-5.
- Garroway, Joshua (2021). "The Jewish Diaspora in Christian Thinking". In Diner, Hasia R. (ed.). The Oxford handbook of the Jewish diaspora. New York, NY: Oxford University Press. pp. 99–116. ISBN 9780197554807.
- Johnson, Paul (1994) [1987]. A History of the Jews. London: Orion Books Limited, Orion House. ISBN 1-85799-096-X.
- Rist, Rebecca (2016). Popes and Jews, 1095-1291. Oxford University Press. pp. 25, 228–229. ISBN 978-0-19-871798-0.
- Stillman, Norman A. (1979). The Jews of Arab lands : a history and source book. Philadelphia : Jewish Publication Society of America. ISBN 978-0-8276-0116-1.
- Synan, Edward A. (1965). The Popes and the Jews in the Middle Ages. New York : The Macmillan Company.
