= Piaskower Synagoge =

Former synagogue in Białystok, Poland

Piaskower Synagogue
- Polish: Synagoga Piaskower
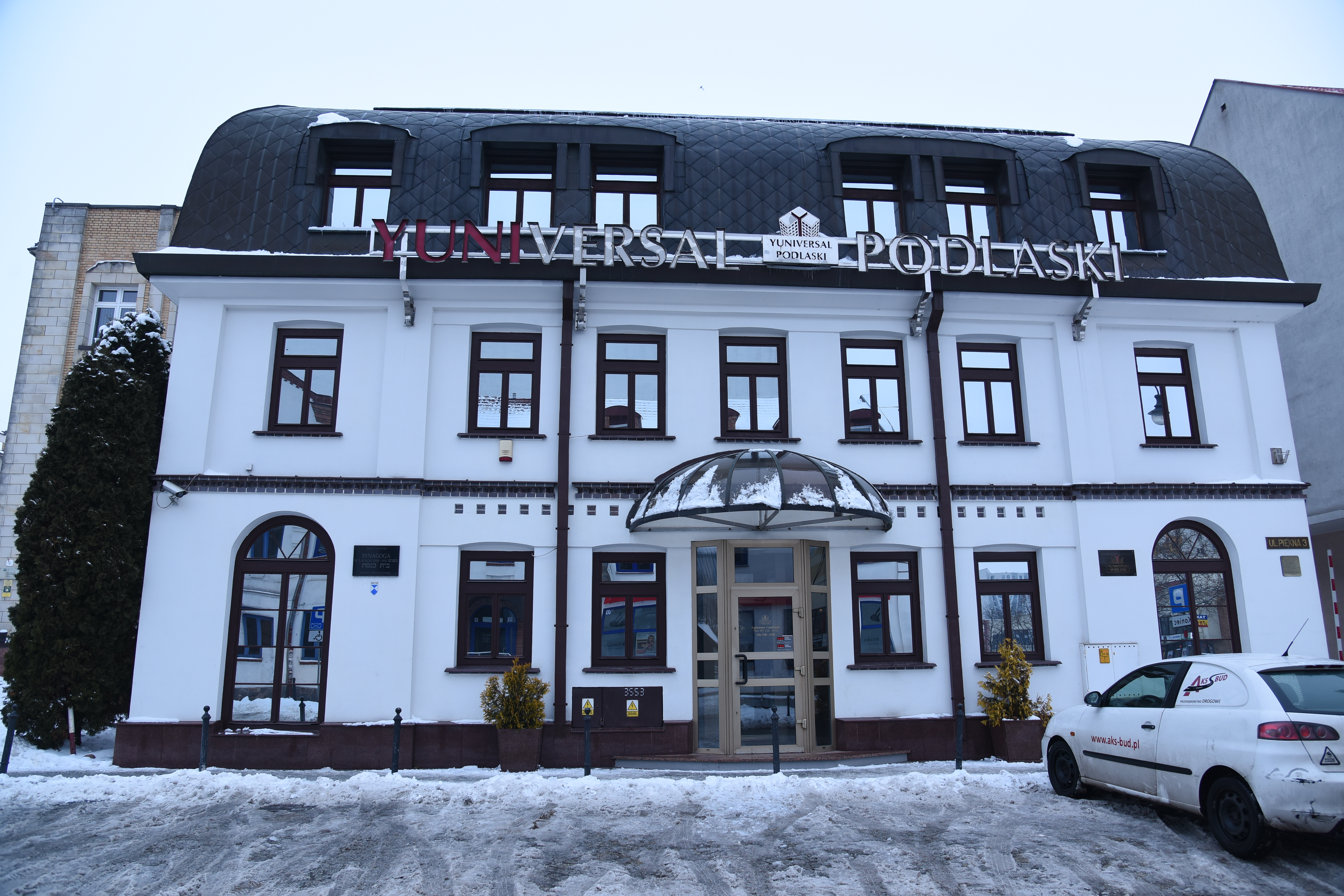
- The former synagogue in 2018

- Location of the former synagogue in Podlaskie Voivodeship

Religion
- Affiliation: Orthodox Judaism (former)
- Rite: Nusach Ashkenaz
- Ecclesiastical or organizational status: Synagogue (1893–1939); Communal use (1945–1968); Profane use (since 1968)
- Status: Abandoned; Repurposed

Location
- Location: 3 Piękna Street, Białystok, Podlaskie Voivodeship
- Country: Poland
- Interactive map of Piaskower Synagogue
- Coordinates: 53°07′45″N 23°09′14″E

Architecture
- Type: Synagogue architecture
- Established: c. 1820 (as a congregation)
- Groundbreaking: 1891
- Completed: 1893
- Materials: Brick

The Piaskower Synagogue (Polish: Synagoga Piaskower) is a former Orthodox Jewish congregation and synagogue, located at 3 Piękna Street, in the Piaski district of Białystok, in the Podlaskie Voivodeship of Poland.

Completed in 1893, the former synagogue served as a place of worship until desecrated by Nazis during World War II. After the war, the former synagogue served as a community center for Jews living in Białystok until 1968, and following a fire in 1989, the building has been used for profane purposes since 1995.

== History ==
The synagogue was constructed from 1891 to 1893 on the site of an earlier wooden synagogue which had been built around 1820.

During the German occupation of Poland in World War II, the synagogue was partially destroyed. From 1945 to 1968, it was the seat of various Białystok Jewish organisations, such as the Socio-cultural Association of Jews in Poland. From 1968, the building was no longer used for specifically Jewish purposes, instead being used as a cinema and a theatre. Renovation work in the 1970s removed the distinctive features that marked it as a synagogue and it burnt down in 1989.

In 1995, the structure was renovated. It is currently the headquarters of the Ludwik Zamenhof Foundation, which sells text-books and literature on Esperanto and offers Esperanto language courses.

== See also ==
- Chronology of Jewish Polish history
- History of the Jews in Poland
- List of active synagogues in Poland
