= Jewish–Polish history (1989–present) =

Aspect of Jewish history

After the fall of Communism in Poland in 1989, Jewish cultural, social, and religious life has experienced a revival. Many historical issues related to the Holocaust and the period of Soviet domination (1945–1989) in the country – suppressed by Communist censorship – have been reevaluated and publicly discussed leading to better understanding and visible improvement in Polish–Jewish relations. In 1990, there were 3,800 Jews in Poland, 0.01% of Poland’s population, compared to 3,250,000 before 1939. The number had dropped to 3,200 in 2010.

== Jewish–Polish current events ==
In 1989, the Soviet-backed regime – notorious for its political repression – collapsed, exposing the rift between the Polish and Jewish communities arising from World War II remembrance and human rights violations committed by the Polish government between 1944 and 1989. Since 1989, the recent experiences of Polish Jews have been widely popularized, including the circumstances surrounding the Massacre in Jedwabne, the Koniuchy Massacre, the Polish–Jewish wartime as well as postwar relations in general, Stalinist reign of terror and the March 1968 events. Many negative stereotypes originating from the cold-war literature on the subject have been challenged. The rescue of Jews by Poles during the Holocaust suppressed by the Soviet-backed regime in an attempt to discredit the Polish resistance movements as reactionary has also been reasserted.

In 1993, the Union of Jewish Religious Communities in Poland (ZGWŻ) was formed to organise religious and cultural life of Jewish communities in Poland. It helps the descendants of Holocaust survivors in a variety of legal matters (communal as well as personal) such as, in the process of recovery and restoration of property once owned by Jewish communities and nationalized in communist Poland. Jewish religious practice has also been helped financially with grants from the Ronald Lauder Foundation. The Polish Jewish community employs steadily two rabbis, runs a network of Jewish schools and summer camps, and sustains several Jewish periodicals and book series.

Academic Jewish studies programs were established at Warsaw University and the Jagiellonian University in Kraków. Kraków became home to the Judaica Foundation, which has sponsored a wide range of cultural and educational programs on Jewish themes for a predominantly Polish audience.

Poland was the first Communist bloc country to recognize Israel in 1986 again, and restore full relations in 1990. Government relations between Poland and Israel are steadily improving, resulting in the mutual visits of presidents and the ministers of foreign affairs. The Polish government financed the construction of the Museum of the History of Polish Jews in Warsaw.

=== Commemoration ===
In September 2000, dignitaries from Poland, Israel, the United States, and other countries (including Prince Hassan of Jordan) gathered in the city of Oświęcim (location of the Auschwitz concentration camp) to commemorate the opening of the refurbished Chevra Lomdei Mishnayot synagogue and the Auschwitz Jewish Center. The synagogue, the sole synagogue in Oświęcim to survive World War II and an adjacent Jewish cultural and educational center, provide visitors a place to pray and to learn about the active pre-World War II Jewish community that existed in Oświęcim. The synagogue was the first communal property in the country to be returned to the Jewish community under the 1997 law allowing for restitution of Jewish communal property.

=== March of the Living ===
In April 2001, during the 13th March of the Living from Auschwitz to Birkenau honouring victims of the Holocaust, several hundred local citizens joined the 2,000 marchers from Israel and other countries. Government officials participating in the event included Members of Parliament, the province's governor, Oświęcim's mayor and the chairman of city council. Schoolchildren, boy scouts, the Polish-Israeli Friendship Society, and the Polish Union of Jewish Students (PUSZ) also participated in the march. In May 2001, several hundred students from around the world marched through the town in The March of Remembrance and Hope.

In April 2002, during the 14th March of the Living from Auschwitz to Birkenau to honor victims of the Holocaust, several hundred citizens joined 1,500 marchers from Israel and other countries.

=== Polish and Jewish views regarding one another ===
The Jewish percentage of the total population of various Polish voivodeships in 2021.

In a 2005 survey commissioned by Anti-Defamation League from New York in 12 European countries, asking about selective stereotypes among 500 callers each, Polish respondents averaged 52% at question No. 1, 43% at No. 2, 43% at No. 3, 52% at No. 4 and 39% at No. 5 (the highest) asked if "The Jews are responsible for the death of Christ", with the lowest percentage of believers that Israeli actions were responsible for violence against European Jews (21% at question No. 7) among all of the 12 countries surveyed. According to a Polish survey conducted in 2005, by CBOS institute (target of critical evaluations themselves by the media), in which Poles were asked to assess their attitudes toward 32 nationalities representing different European and non-European countries, 45% claimed to feel antipathy towards Jews (steadily decreasing) with 18% to feel sympathy (fluctuating by up to 10 percentage points annually; in 1997 it was 28%), while 29% felt impartial and 8% were undecided. Those surveyed were asked to express their feeling on the scale from −3 (strong antipathy) to +3 (strong sympathy). The average score for attitude towards Jews was −0.67 in that year. In the CBOS survey from 2010, antipathy decreased to 27%, and sympathy rose to 31% (down from 34% in 2008). The average score for attitude was +0.05 at that time.

The Chief Rabbi of Poland, Michael Schudrich, said in a BBC interview: "it's ... false and painful stereotype that all Poles are antisemitic. This is something I want to clearly state: this is a false stereotype. Today there is antisemitism in Poland, as unfortunately the rest of Europe; it is more or less at the same level as the rest of Europe. More important is that you have a growing number of Poles who oppose antisemitism."

According to Alina Cała, in 1968 the Moczarite faction transposed the Jewish victims of the Holocaust with their persecutors, accusing the Jews of support for the Nazis. While this faction was suppressed and broken up after one year, no attempt was taken to combat antisemitism and this propaganda has had long lasting effects in Polish society. Cała sees modern antisemitism in Poland as a mix of pre-war anti-communist propaganda augmented by Moczarite propaganda whose communist roots are clearly evident. According to Cała since 2007 antisemitism has been on the decline in Poland, though still evident in Polish discourse.

According to an ADL report released in 2012, based on telephone survey of 500 adults in Poland (out of the total number of 5,000 adults polled by Ipsos-Reid in 10 European countries), 54% of Poles continue to believe in some antisemitic stereotypes. The percentage is down from similar survey conducted in 2009. For instance, with regard to a question of whether "Jews have too much power in the business world", Poles surveyed ranked the third-highest after Hungary (73%) and Spain (60%). On another question regarding loyalty of their Jewish citizens, the surveyed Poles answered at par with Italians at 61% (overall, more than half of all European respondents gave the same answer). Later research conducted in Poland and published in 2013 revealed that more than 64.4% of the population agree with phrases that express belief in Jewish conspiracy (Jews would like to control the international financial institution; Jews often meet in hiding to discuss their plans; etc.) Moreover, the survey found that people who believed that Jews are a collectively intentional group that aims at dominating the world were the ones who would most strongly oppose Jewish rights to buy land, to open businesses, or to regain their lost properties. People who hold such beliefs are also unwilling to vote for a political candidate with Jewish origins or to accept a Jew in their closest environment. The study's results were presented to the Polish Sejm (parliament) in January 2014 and were well received by most of its members. Towards the end of 2014, a study conducted by Warsaw University Center for Research on Prejudice found out that more than half of Polish youth visit antisemitic websites that glorify Hitler and the Nazi era. It was also found that some Polish participants agreed with antisemitic phrases. The study's results were presented to the Polish parliament.

In July 2013, following animal rights activist campaigns and the European Council directive of September 24, 2009, the Polish government passed an animal protection law that had the effect of banning kosher slaughter. This was condemned by Jewish groups in Poland and around the world. Poland is the second member state of the European Union to pass a relevant bill, after Sweden. In the parliamentary vote, although 178 members voted for re-legalizing ritual slaughter, 222 members opposed it. The new law is causing concerns for some Polish meat processing plants. The shechita ritual requires cutting the throat of an animal without stunning it first. According to FAWC it can take up to two minutes for cattle to bleed to death.

A research published by Pew Research Center in June 2015 revealed that out of six European countries researched, Poland has the most unfavorable opinion of Jews. While 78% of Europeans have a favorable opinion of Jews, only 59% of the participants in Poland have positive feelings for Jewish people, and 28% hold unfavorable opinion. According to the authors, these outcomes shows no significance change from previous studies.

The lead of the article "The Resurgence of Antisemitic Discourse in Poland" by Rafał Pankowski says: "The surge of hostility to Jews and the Jewish State in the Polish media and politics in early 2018 took many observers by surprise. ... It was also a great shock because for many years, bilateral relations between Poland and Israel had been especially cordial and fruitful".

A new spat developed between Poland and Israel in February 2019 following comments made by Prime Minister Netanyahu about Poland's alleged cooperation with the occupying Nazi régime in the Holocaust during WWII, which resulted in Poland's Prime Minister Morawiecki cancelling his visit to a summit in Israel. Netanyahu subsequently issued a clarification which in the eyes of the Polish authorities still amounted to a gross calumny.

== Antisemitism ==
On May 10th, 2023, Warsaw's Nożyk Synagogue, the only surviving pre-war Jewish house of prayer in the Polish capital, was firebombed in an attack condemned by Polish officials, religious leaders, and ambassadors from the US and Israel. The attack caused minimal damage and no injuries. The incident happened on the 20th anniversary of Poland joining the European Union, leading to speculation by some officials that it may have been intended to disrupt the celebrations.

== See also ==
- History of the Jews in Poland
  - History of the Jews in Poland before the 18th century
  - History of the Jews in 18th-century Poland
  - History of the Jews in 19th-century Poland
  - History of the Jews in 20th-century Poland
  - Jewish-Polish history (1989–present)
  - Timeline of Jewish-Polish history
- Israel–Poland relations
- The Auschwitz cross
- Nozyk Synagogue
- Jewish Culture Festival
- Festival of Jewish Culture in Warsaw
