= History of the Jews in 19th-century Poland =

Aspect of Jewish history

The history of the Jews in 19th-century Poland covers the period of Jewish-Polish history from the dismemberment of the Polish–Lithuanian Commonwealth (see also: Partitions of Poland), until the beginning of the 20th century.

== Jews of Poland within the Russian Empire (1795–1918) ==
Official Russian policy would eventually prove to be substantially harsher to the Jews than that under independent Polish rule. The lands that had once been Poland were to remain the home of many Jews, as, in 1772, Catherine II, the tzarina of Russia, instituted the Pale of Settlement, restricting Jews to the western parts of the empire, which would eventually include much Poland although it excluded some areas in which Jews had previously lived. By the late 19th century, over four million Jews would live in the Pale.

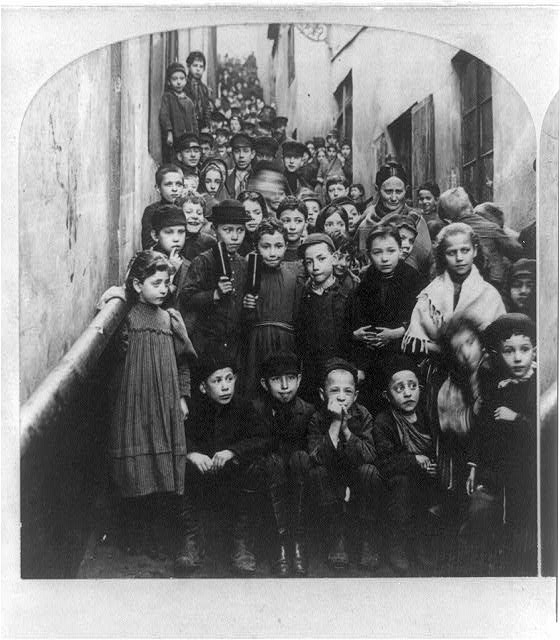
Jewish children in a street of Warsaw, Poland in 1897.

Initially, Russian policy towards the Jews of Poland was confused, alternating between harsh rules and somewhat more enlightened policies. In 1802, the Tsar established the Committee on the Improvement of the Jews in an attempt to develop a coherent approach to the Empire's new Jewish population. The Committee in 1804 suggested a number of steps that were designed to encourage Jews to assimilate, though it did not force them to do so. It proposed that Jews be allowed to attend school and even to own land, but it restricted them from entering Russia, banned them from the brewing industry, and included a number of other prohibitions. The more enlightened parts of this policy were never fully implemented, and the conditions of the Jews in the Pale gradually worsened. In the 1820s, the Cantonist Laws passed by Tsar Nicolas kept the traditional double taxation on Jews in lieu of army service, while actually requiring all Jewish communities to produce boys to serve in the military, where they were often forced to convert.

One of the most important events of that period was the establishment of the Rabbinical School, a Junior High School for Jewish male youth founded in 1826 on the basis of the Tsar's decree of July 1, 1825 and existed until the school year 1860/1861.

In four school years the following subjects were taught: Old Testament, Midrash (commentaries on the Holy Scriptures), Talmud, general history, history of Poland, mathematics, geography, Hebrew, Polish, German and French. The graduates from the School were members of the Jewish intelligentsia related with the assimilation movement.

Only a few graduates dedicated themselves to the profession of rabbi. Supplementary classes were planned for them. Most of the graduates formed Warsaw's progressive Jewish elite: entrepreneurs, merchants, scientists, journalists, artists and patrons of the arts.

The founding committee appointed by the government of Congress Poland consisted of three Poles, including Stefan Witwicki. The rabbinical school was headed by Antoni Eisenbaum from its founding until his death in 1852, then by Jakub Tugendhold until its closure in 1862. Jews and Christians worked as teachers. Altogether about one thousand Jews graduated from the rabbinical school. The school inspired patriotic attitudes. Some students, like Stanislas Hernisz, took part in the November Uprising of 1831.

The Warsaw Rabbinical School was bitterly criticized by the Orthodox Jews’ circles. Throughout Eisenbaum's tenure at the school, rumors abounded that boys attending the school were fed treyf meals and were generally pressed to abandon their religion. It did not help matters that the school inspector was a catholic priest, the Christian Hebraist Luigi Chiarini, a notorious critic of the Talmud. Worse yet, the school's instructor of Hebrew and Bible was Abraham Buchner, like Eisenbaum a radical enlightener, who taught Hebrew using Chiarini's grammar and used Mendelssohn's Biblical commentaries.

Though the Jews were accorded slightly more rights with the emancipation reform of 1861, they were still restricted to the Pale of Settlement and subject to restrictions on ownership and profession. In 1881, however, the status-quo was shattered with the assassination of Tsar Alexander II, which was falsely blamed on the Jews.

== Pogroms ==
The assassination prompted a large-scale wave of anti-Jewish riots, called pogroms throughout 1881–1884. In the 1881 outbreak, pogroms also occurred in Russia, in a riot in Warsaw twelve Jews were killed, many others were wounded, and women were raped while over two million rubles worth of property was destroyed. The new czar, Alexander III, blamed the Jews for the riots and issued a series of harsh restrictions on Jewish movements, but large numbers of pogroms continued until 1884, with at least tacit government approval. The pogroms proved a turning point in the history of the Jews in Poland, and throughout the world. They prompted a great flood of Jewish immigration to the United States, with almost two million Jews leaving the Pale by the late 1920s, and the pogroms set the stage for Zionism.

An even bloodier wave of pogroms broke out from 1903 to 1906, including the Kishinev pogrom (April 1903), the Odessa pogrom (October 1905), the Kiev pogrom (October 1905), and the Białystok pogrom (April 1906). Hundreds of Jews were killed and many more wounded.

== Haskalah ==
The Jewish Enlightenment, Haskalah, began to take hold in Poland during the 19th century, stressing secular ideas and values. Champions of Haskalah, the Maskilim, pushed for assimilation and integration into Russian culture. At the same time, there was another school of Jewish thought that emphasized traditional study and a Jewish response to the ethical problems of anti-semitism and persecution, one form of which was the Musar movement. Though the Jews in the Pale were generally poorer and less educated than in other areas, they were still part of the debate over the future of Judaism in the 19th century.

== Politics in Polish territory ==
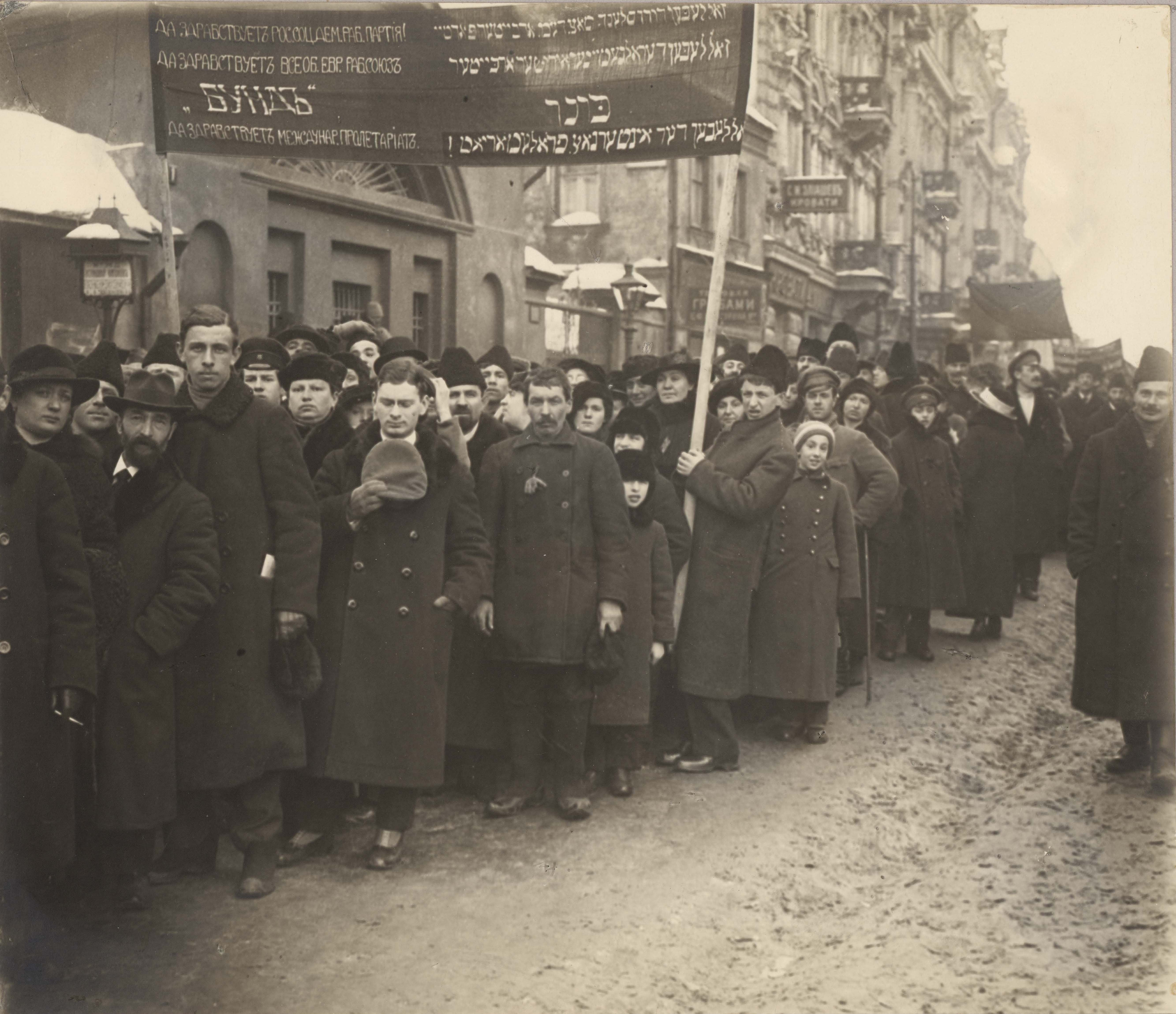
A Bundist demonstration, 1917

By the late 19th century, Haskalah and the debates it caused created a growing number of political movements within the Jewish community itself, covering a wide range of views and vying for votes in local and regional elections. Zionism became very popular with the advent of the Poale Zion party as well as the religious Polish Mizrahi, and the increasingly popular General Zionists. Jews also took up socialism, forming General Jewish Labour Bund and the Folksists (People's Party) which supported assimilation and the rights of labor. Many Jews took part in the Revolutionary Movement of 1905.

Jews joined also Polish struggles for an independent Poland. Many Jews participated in a number of Polish insurrections against the Russian Empire, including the Kościuszko Uprising (1794), and the January Insurrection (1863). Jewish student Michał Landy was killed by Russian soldiers during a Polish demonstration in Warsaw, 1861. Although Christians weren't allowed by the police to participate in his burial, Michał Landy became soon a powerful symbol of Polish Jewish brotherhood.

== See also ==
- History of the Jews in Poland
  - History of the Jews in Poland before the 18th century
  - History of the Jews in 18th-century Poland
  - History of the Jews in 19th-century Poland
  - History of the Jews in 20th-century Poland
  - Jewish-Polish history (1989–present)
  - Hasidic Judaism in Poland
  - Timeline of Jewish-Polish history
