= History of the Jews in 18th-century Poland =

Aspect of Jewish history

The 18th century for the Jews of Poland was a tumultuous period as political unrest in the Polish–Lithuanian Commonwealth led to changes in the treatment and behavior of Jews living within its territory. The ascent of the Wettin dynasty to the Polish throne, as well as the government's difficulties in procuring taxes led to a waning of previous policies of religious tolerance in Poland, and the partitions of Poland during the second half of the century led to widespread violence as the government's power faltered and various regional powers and separatist movements fought for control of the territory.

In terms of religious and spiritual practice, the 18th century saw the development of Hasidic Judaism. Stemming from the teachings of the Baal Shem Tov and drawing on the traditions of Kabbalah, Hasidic Judaism emphasized emotion and religious ecstasy over the academic dogmatism that had previously come to define Orthodox Judaism in Eastern Europe. During this time period, the Jewish community of Poland would also experience the tail-end of Sabbatianism in the form of the followers of Jacob Frank, who claimed to be a successor of Sabbatai Zevi.

== Accession of the Wettin dynasty ==
With the accession to the throne of the Saxon dynasty the Jews completely lost the support of the government. Although Augustus II the Strong (1697–1733), and August III Wettin (1733–1763) officially confirmed at their coronations the Jewish charters, such formal declarations were insufficient to guard the already limited rights of the Jews against the hostile elements, owing to the disorders prevailing in the kingdom. The government was anxious only to collect from the Kahals the taxes, which were constantly being made heavier despite the Jews having not yet recovered from the ruinous events of the Cossacks' uprising and the Swedish invasion. The Jews' plight was compounded by the fact that the Sejm, composed of nobility and Catholic clergy, blocked all attempts to levy taxes on nobility or clergy, thus only townsfolk and Jews were taxed.

The szlachta and the townsfolk were increasingly hostile to the Jews, as the religious tolerance that dominated the mentality of the previous generations of the Commonwealth citizens was slowly forgotten. In their intolerance, the citizens of the Commonwealth now approached the "standards" that dominated most of the contemporary European countries, and many Jews felt betrayed by the country they once viewed as their haven. In the larger cities, like Poznań and Kraków, quarrels between the Christian and Jewish inhabitants were common and they assumed a very violent aspect. Based originally on economic grounds, they were carried over into the religious arena; and it was evident that the seeds which the Jesuits had planted had finally borne fruit. Ecclesiastical councils displayed great hatred toward the Jews. Attacks on the latter by students, the so-called Schüler-Gelauf, became every-day occurrences in the large cities, the police regarding such scholastic riots with indifference. Lawlessness, violence, and disorder reigned supreme at that time in Poland, marking the beginning of the downfall of the kingdom. In order to protect themselves against such occurrences, the Jewish communities in many cities made annual contributions to the local Catholic schools.

== The rise of Hasidism ==
The decade from the Cossacks' uprising until after the Swedish war (1648–1658) left a deep and lasting impression not only on the social life of the Polish-Lithuanian Jews, but on their spiritual life as well. The intellectual output of the Jews of Poland was reduced. The Talmudic learning which up to that period had been the common possession of the majority of the people became accessible to a limited number of students only. What religious study there was became overly formalized, some rabbis busied themselves with quibbles concerning religious laws; others wrote commentaries on different parts of the Talmud in which hair-splitting arguments were raised and discussed; and at times these arguments dealt with matters which were of no practical moment. At the same time, many miracle-workers made their appearance among the Jews of Poland, as even famous rabbis of that time devoted themselves to kabbalistic practices, this mysticism culminated in a series of false "Messianic" movements, and Sabbatianism was succeeded by Frankism among the Jews of Poland.

In this time of mysticism and overly formal rabbinism came the teachings of Israel ben Eliezer, known as the Baal Shem Tov, or BeShT, (1698–1760), which had a profound effect on the Jews of Eastern Europe and Poland in particular. His disciples taught and encouraged the new fervent brand of Orthodox Judaism based on Kabbalah known as Hasidism. One of those great disciples and teachers was Rabbi Elimelech of Lizhensk (1717–1786). Many of these disciples became Rebbes themselves with followings, as with the Gerer Hasidic dynasty which was begun by Rabbi Yitzchak Meir Alter (1798–1866). Hasidism gave a ready response to the burning desire of the common people in its simple, stimulating, and comforting faith. In contradistinction to other sectarian teaching, early Hasidism aimed not at dogmatic or ritual reform, but at a deeper psychological one. Its aim was to change not the belief, but the believer. It created a new type of religious man, a type that placed emotion above reason and rites, and religious exaltation above knowledge.

The rise of Hasidic Judaism within Poland's borders and beyond has had a great influence on the rise of Haredi Judaism all over the world, with a continuous influence that has been felt from the inception of the Hasidic movements and its dynasties by famous rebbes until the present time. The following are noteworthy:

- Aleksander Hasidism
- Bobov Hasidism
- Ger Hasidism
- Nadvorna Hasidism
- Sassov Hasidism

== First partition ==
Disorder and anarchy reigned supreme in Poland during the second half of the 18th century, from the accession to the throne of its last king, Stanislaus II Augustus Poniatowski (1764–1795). This state of affairs was due to the haughty demeanor of the nobility toward the lower classes. The necessity for reform was recognized by the king and by many of the Commonwealth citizens; but Poland was already in the grasp of Russia, and little could be done in this direction. Jewish affairs were sadly neglected, the government seeking merely the extortion of larger taxes; thus the Sejm which met at Warsaw in 1764 for the discussion of measures of reform considered the Jews only to the extent of changing the tax system. About this time, and as a direct consequence of the disorganization of Poland, the disastrous incursions of the brigand bands known as the Haidamaka took place. The movement originated in Podolia and in that part of Ukraine which still belonged to Poland.

These and other internal disorders combined to hasten the end of Poland as a sovereign state. In 1772, in the aftermath of the Confederation of Bar, the outlying provinces were divided among the three neighboring nations, Russia, Austria, and Prussia. Russia secured a considerable part of the territory now known as Belarus; Austria obtained Galicia and a part of Podolia; while Prussia received Pomerelia and the lands lying along the lower Vistula. Jews were most numerous in the territories that fell to the lot of Austria and Russia.

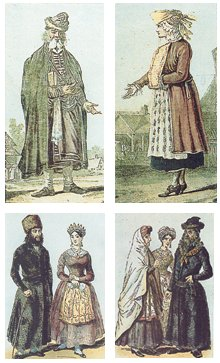
Drawings of Jewish dress from the 17th and 18th centuries (top) and 18th centuries (bottom).

The permanent council established at the instance of the Russian government (1773–1788) served as the highest administrative tribunal, and occupied itself with the elaboration of a plan that would make practicable the reorganization of Poland on a more rational basis. The progressive elements in Polish society recognized the urgency of popular education as the very first step toward reform. In 1773 the Society of Jesus in Poland was abolished by Pope Clement XIV, who thus freed Polish youth from the demoralizing influences of Jesuitism. The famous Komisja Edukacji Narodowej ("Commission of National Education"), first Ministry of Education in the world, was established in 1773 and founded numerous new schools and remodeled the old ones. One of the members of the commission, kanclerz Andrzej Zamoyski, along with others, demanded that the inviolability of their persons and property should be guaranteed and that religious toleration should be to a certain extent granted them; but he insisted that Jews living in the cities should be separated from the Christians, that those of them having no definite occupation should be banished from the kingdom, and that even those engaged in agriculture should not be allowed to possess land. On the other hand, some szlachta and intellectuals proposed a national system of government, of the civil and political equality of the Jews. This was the only example in modern Europe before the French Revolution of tolerance and broad-mindedness in dealing with the Jewish question. On 3 May 1791 the Great Sejm passed the second oldest constitution of the world, the Polish Constitution of 3 May. But all these reforms were too late. Through the intrigues and bribery of Catherine II of Russia the Confederation of Targowica was formed, to which belonged the adherents of the old order of things. A Russian army invaded Poland, and soon after a Prussian one followed.

== The second and third partitions ==
A second partition of Poland was made July 17, 1793, Russia taking a large part of White Russia, half of Volhynia, all of Podolia, and the part of Ukraine which had previously been retained by Poland, and Prussians taking Great Poland (Poznań).

A general uprising (Kościuszko Uprising) of the citizens of the Polish–Lithuanian Commonwealth took place in 1794. Tadeusz Kościuszko was made its leader and dictator, and succeeded in driving the Russians out of Warsaw. Dissensions, however, arose among the Poles, and the Russians and Prussians again entered Poland in force. Kościuszko was decisively defeated at Battle of Maciejowice October 10, 1794; Alexander Suvorov entered Warsaw on November 8, and Polish resistance came to an end. The Jews took an active part in this last struggle of Poland for independence. With the permission of Kościuszko, Berek Joselewicz (1764–1809) formed a regiment of light cavalry consisting entirely of Jews. This regiment accomplished many deeds of valor on the field of battle and distinguished itself especially at the siege of Warsaw, nearly all its members perishing in the defence and eventual massacre of Praga, the fortified suburb of the capital.

The third and final partition of Poland took place in 1795. Russia acquired the whole of Lithuania and Courland; Austria, the remainder of Galicia, and Podolia, including Kraków; Prussia, the rest of Poland, including Warsaw, the capital; and with that Poland ceased to exist as an independent country. The great bulk of the Jewish population was transferred to Russia, and thus became subjects of that empire, although in the first half of the 19th century some semblance of a Polish state was preserved, greatly diminished, especially in the form of the Congress Poland (1815–1831).

== See also ==
- History of the Jews in Poland
  - History of the Jews in Poland before the 18th century
  - History of the Jews in 18th-century Poland
  - History of the Jews in 19th-century Poland
  - History of the Jews in 20th-century Poland
  - Jewish-Polish history (1989–present)
  - Timeline of Jewish-Polish history
