= Nożyk Synagogue =

Orthodox synagogue in Warsaw, Poland

- Polish: Synagoga Nożyków
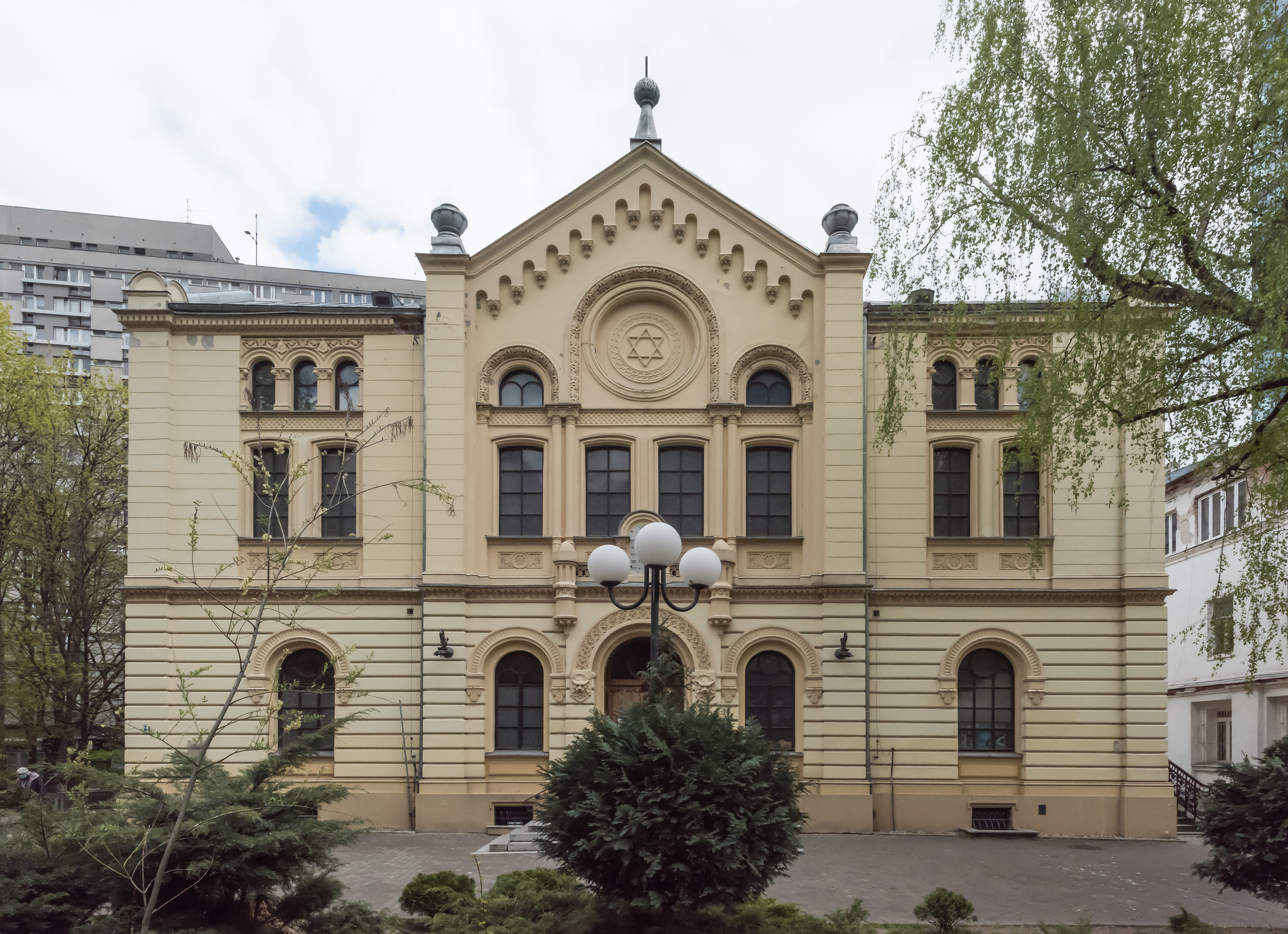
- The synagogue in 2020

- Location of the synagogue in Masovian Voivodeship

Religion
- Affiliation: Orthodox Judaism
- Rite: Nusach Ashkenaz
- Ecclesiastical or organizational status: Synagogue: (1902–1939); (1941–1968); (since 1983); Profane use (1939–1941)
- Leadership: Rabbi Michael Schudrich
- Status: Active

Location
- Location: 6 Twarda Street, Śródmieście, Warsaw, Masovian Voivodeship
- Country: Poland
- Interactive map of Nożyk Synagogue
- Coordinates: 52°14′10″N 21°00′04″E

Architecture
- Architects: Karol Kozłowski; Maurycy Grodzieński
- Type: Synagogue architecture
- Style: Romanesque Revival; Rundbogenstil
- Funded by: Zalman Nożyk
- Established: 1898 (as a congregation)
- Groundbreaking: 1898
- Completed: 1902
- Construction cost: 250,000 rubles

Specifications
- Capacity: 600 seats
- Materials: Brick

Website
- warszawa.jewish.org.pl (in Polish)

The Nożyk Synagogue (Polish: Synagoga Nożyków) is an Orthodox Jewish congregation and synagogue, located at 6 Twarda Street, in the Śródmieście district of Warsaw, in the Masovian Voivodeship of Poland.

Designed by Karol Kozłowski in the Romanesque Revival and Rundbogenstil styles and completed in 1902, the synagogue is the only surviving prewar Jewish house of prayer in Warsaw. The synagogue was desecrated by Nazis during World War II, was restored after the war, and remains operational. The synagogue building also houses the Warsaw Jewish Commune, as well as other Jewish organizations.

== History ==
Before World War II the Jewish community of Warsaw was one of the largest Jewish communities in the world at that time, with over 400 houses of prayer. However, at the end of 20th century only two of them were separate structures, while the rest were smaller chapels attached to schools, hospitals or private homes.

The earliest round synagogue in the borough of Praga served the local community since 1839, while the Great Synagogue (erected in 1878) was built for the Reform community. Soon afterwards a need arose to build a temple also for the Orthodox Jewry. Between 1898 and 1902 Zalman Nożyk, a renowned Warsaw merchant, and his wife Ryfka financed such temple at Twarda street, next to the neighbourhood of Grzybów and Grzybowski Square.

The building was designed by a famous Warsaw architect, Karol Kozłowski, designer of the Warsaw Philharmonic Orchestra Hall. The façade is neo-Romanticist, with notable neo-Byzantine elements. The building itself is rectangular, with the internal chamber divided into three aisles.

The synagogue was officially opened to the public on May 26, 1902. In 1914 the founders donated it to the Warsaw Jewish Commune, in exchange for yearly prayers in their intention. In 1923 the building was refurbished by Maurycy Grodzieński, who also designed a semi-circular choir that was attached to the eastern wall of the temple. In September 1939 the synagogue was damaged during an air raid. During World War II the area was part of the Small Ghetto and shared its fate during the Ghetto Uprising and then the liquidation of the Jewish community of Warsaw by the Nazis. After 1941 the Germans used the building as stables and a depot.

=== Restoration ===
After the war the demolished building was partially restored and returned to the Warsaw Jewish Commune, but the reconstruction did not start. It was completely rebuilt between 1977 and 1983 (officially opened 18 April 1983). It was also then that a new wing was added to the eastern wall, currently housing the seat of the commune, as well as several other Jewish organizations. Currently it is in use daily as both a place of worship as well as a place of gathering.

On 1 May 2024, an unknown perpetrator struck the synagogue with three firebombs that resulted in minimal damage and no casualties. Poland's president Andrzej Duda condemned the attack. U.S. Ambassador Mark Brzezinski told reporters that "The Nożyk synagogue is a symbol of survival, and we stand in solidarity with Nożyk today and tomorrow.”

== Gallery ==
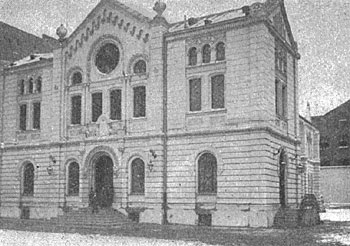
The synagogue in 1909

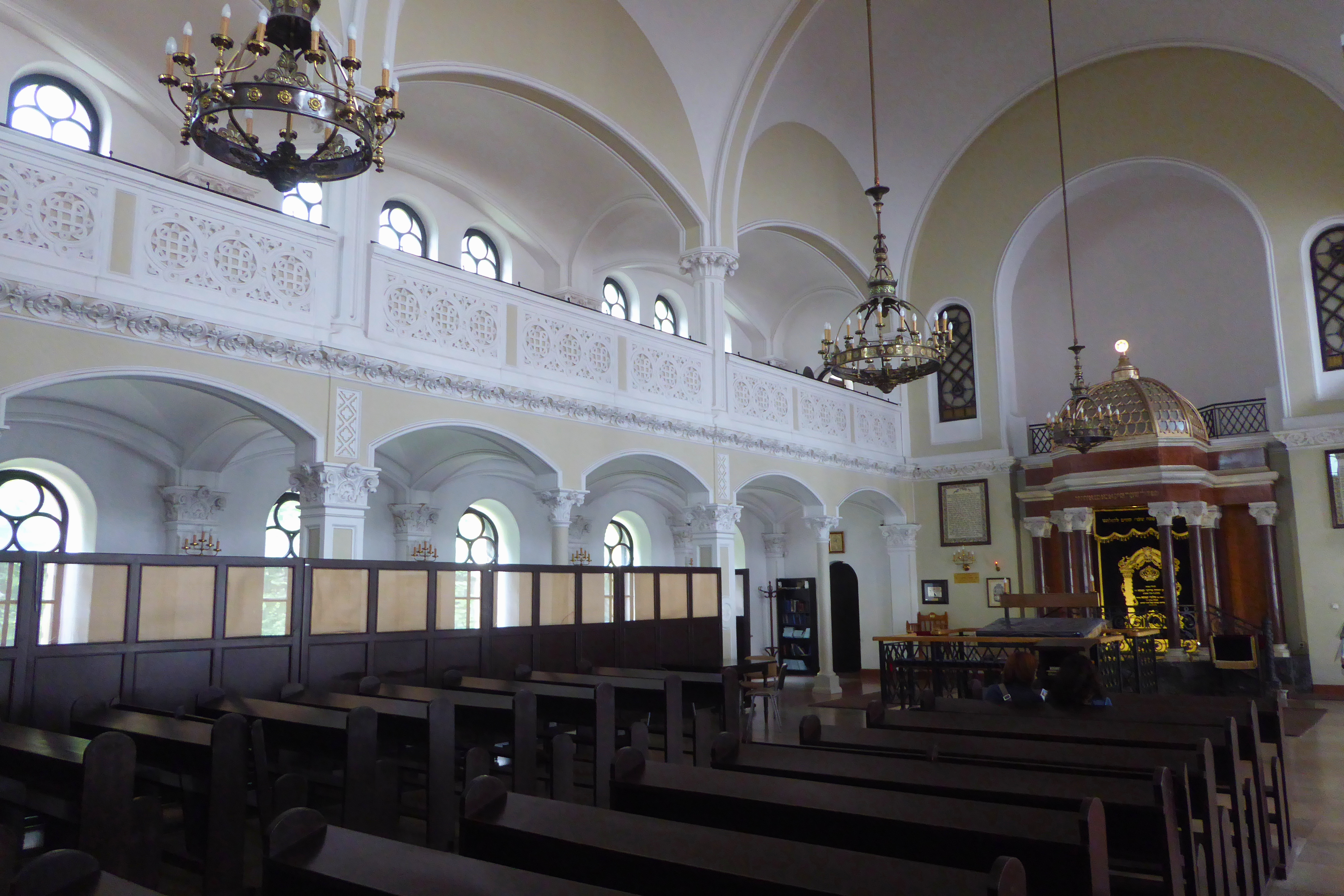
Synagogue interior

== See also ==
- Chronology of Jewish Polish history
- History of the Jews in Warsaw
- List of active synagogues in Poland
