= Daniel J. Lasker =

American-born Israeli scholar of Jewish philosophy

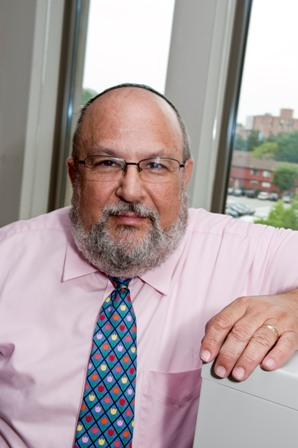
Daniel Lasker

Daniel Judah Lasker (born April 5, 1949) is an American-born Israeli scholar of Jewish philosophy. As of 2017, he is Professor Emeritus in the Department of Jewish thought at Ben Gurion University of the Negev.

== Work ==
He also served as the vice president of the Society for Judaeo-Arabic Studies which is housed at the Ben Zvi institute, Jerusalem.
