= History of the Jews in Poland before the 18th century =

The history of the Jews in Poland before the 18th century covers the period of Jewish-Polish history from its origins, roughly until the political and socio-economic circumstances leading to the dismemberment of the Polish–Lithuanian Commonwealth in the second half of the 18th century by the neighbouring empires (see also: Partitions of Poland).

== Early period: 966–1385 ==
The first Jews arrived in the territory of modern Poland in the 10th century. Travelling along the trade routes leading eastwards to Kiev and Bukhara, the Jewish merchants (who included the Radhanites) also crossed the areas of Silesia. One of them, a diplomat and merchant from the Moorish town of Tortosa in Al-Andalus, known under his Arabic name Ibrahim ibn Jakub was the first chronicler to mention the Polish state under the rule of prince Mieszko I. The first actual mention of Jews in Polish chronicles occurs in the 11th century. It appears that Jews were then living in Gniezno, at that time the capital of the Polish kingdom of Piast dynasty. Some of them were wealthy, owning Christian serfs in keeping with the feudal system of the times. The first permanent Jewish community is mentioned in 1085 by a Jewish scholar Jehuda ha Kohen in the city of Przemyśl.

The first extensive Jewish emigration from Western Europe to Poland occurred at the time of the First Crusade (1098). Under Boleslaw III of Poland (1102–1139), the Jews, encouraged by the tolerant régime of this ruler, settled throughout Poland, including over the border into Lithuanian territory as far as Kiev. Boleslaw, for his part, recognized the utility of the Jews in the development of the commercial interests of his country. The Prince of Kraków, Mieszko III the Old (1173–1202), in his endeavor to establish law and order in his domains, prohibited all violence against the Jews, particularly attacks upon them by unruly students (żacy). Boys guilty of such attacks, or their parents, were made to pay fines as heavy as those imposed for sacrilegious acts.

Coins unearthed in 1872 in the Polish village of Glenbok bear Hebrew inscriptions, suggesting that Jews were in charge of the coinage in Great and Little Poland during the 12th century. These coins bear emblems having inscriptions of various characters; in some examples only the name of the king or prince being given, as, for instance, "Prince Meshko", while in others the surname is added, as "Meshek the Blessed" or "the Just." Some of the coins, moreover, bear inscriptions having no direct reference to Poland, to the reigning princes, or even to the coin itself, but referring to incidents of a purely Jewish character, as, for instance, "Rejoice, Abraham, Isaac, and Jacob"; "Abraham Duchs and Abraham Pech (some scholars, including Maximilian Gumplovicz and Avraham Firkovich, identified, probably erroneously, "Pech" with the Khazar title of Bek)." Similar coins had been discovered elsewhere several years earlier; but, owing to their peculiar inscriptions, doubts were expressed, even by such a noted numismatist as Joachim Lelewel, as to their being coins at all. Their true nature was revealed only with the discovery of the Glenbok treasure. All the inscriptions on the coins of the 12th century are in Hebrew; and they sufficiently prove that at the time in question the Jews had already established themselves in positions of trust and prominence, and were contented with their lot.

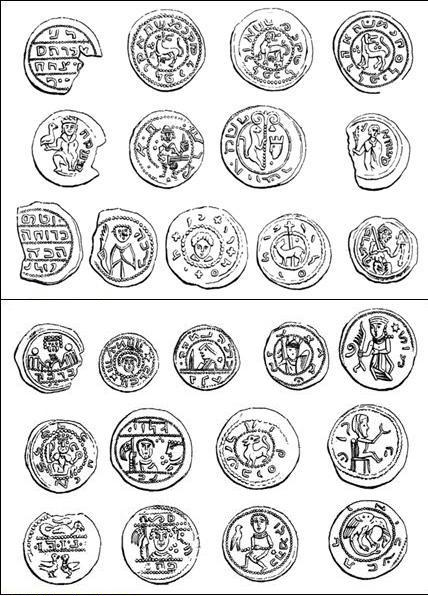
Early medieval Polish coins with Hebrew inscriptions

"The Jewish coiners", says Bershadski, "might have been people who came to the country only occasionally, and for that special purpose." But there is found among the few documents dating from the second half of the 13th century a charter issued by Premysł II, successor of Boleslaw of Kalisz, confirming a previous grant of privileges whereby the Jew Rupin, son of Yoshka, is permitted to dispose of his inheritance, a hill ("montem") situated near the boundary of his estate of Podgozhe. It is difficult to assume that the acquisition of real estate, its transmission by inheritance, and its further cession to the "Jewish elders of Kalisz and their entire community" were permitted on the strength of the charter of privileges granted by Boleslaw of Kalisz to Jewish immigrants, for the charter makes no mention of a Jewish community, nor of the right of Jews to acquire landed property. "The facts", says Bershadski, "made plain by the grant of Przemysł II prove that the Jews were ancient inhabitants of Poland, and that the charter of Boleslaw of Kalisz, copied almost verbally from the privileges of Ottocar of Bohemia, was merely a written approval of relations that had become gradually established, and had received the sanction of the people of the country." Bershadski comes to the conclusion that as early as the 13th century there existed in Poland a number of Jewish communities, the most important of which was that of Kalisz.

Early in the 13th century Jews owned land in Polish Silesia, Greater Poland and Kuyavia, including the village of Mały Tyniec. There were also established Jewish communities in Wrocław, Świdnica, Głogów, Lwówek, Płock, Kalisz, Szczecin, Gdańsk and Gniezno. It is clear that the Jewish communities must have been well-organized by then. Also, the earliest known artifact of Jewish settlement on Polish soil is a tombstone of certain David ben Sar Shalom found in Wrocław and dated 25 av 4963, that is August 4, 1203.

From the various sources it is evident that at this time the Jews enjoyed undisturbed peace and prosperity in the many principalities into which the country was then divided. In the interests of commerce the reigning princes extended protection and special privileges to the Jewish settlers. With the descent of the Mongols on Polish territory (1241) the Jews in common with the other inhabitants suffered severely. Kraków was pillaged and burned, other towns were devastated, and hundreds of Poles, including many Jews, were carried into captivity. As the tide of invasion receded the Jews returned to their old homes and occupations. They formed the middle class in a country where the general population consisted of landlords (developing into szlachta, the unique Polish nobility) and peasants, and they were instrumental in promoting the commercial interests of the land. Money-lending and the farming of the different government revenues, such as those from the salt mines, the customs, etc., were their most important pursuits. The native population had not yet become permeated with the religious intolerance of western Europe, and lived at peace with the Jews.

=== General Charter of Jewish Liberties ===
The tolerant situation was gradually altered by the Roman Catholic Church on the one hand, and by the neighboring German states on the other. The emissaries of the Roman pontiffs came to Poland in pursuance of a fixed policy; and in their endeavors to strengthen the influence of the Catholic Church they spread teachings imbued with intolerance toward the followers of Judaism. At the same time Boleslaus V of Poland (1228–1279), encouraged the influx of German colonists. He granted to them the Magdeburg Rights, and by establishing them in the towns introduced there an element which brought with it deep-seated prejudices against the Jews.

There were, however, among the reigning princes some determined protectors of the Jewish inhabitants, who considered the presence of the latter most desirable in so far as the economic development of the country was concerned. Prominent among such rulers was Bolesław the Pious, of Kalisz, Prince of Great Poland. With the consent of the class representatives and higher officials, in 1264 he issued a General Charter of Jewish Liberties, the Statute of Kalisz, which clearly defined the position of his Jewish subjects. The charter dealt in detail with all sides of Jewish life, particularly the relations of the Jews to their Christian neighbors. The guiding principle in all its provisions was justice, while national, racial, and religious motives were entirely excluded. It granted all Jews the freedom of worship, trade and travel. Also, all Jews under the suzerainty of the duke were protected by the Voivode and killing a Jew was penalized with death and the confiscation of all the property of the murderer's family.

But while the secular authorities endeavored to regulate the relations of the Jews to the country at large in accordance with its economic needs, the clergy, inspired by the attempts of the Roman Catholic Church to establish its universal supremacy, used its influence toward separating the Jews from the body politic, aiming to exclude them, as people dangerous to the Church, from Christian society, and to place them in the position of a despised "sect". In 1266 an ecumenical council was held at Wrocław under the chairmanship of the papal nuncio Guido. The council introduced into the ecclesiastical statutes of Poland a number of paragraphs directed against the Jews.

The Jews were ordered to dispose as quickly as possible of real estate owned by them in the Christian quarters; they were not to appear on the streets during Church processions; they were allowed to have only a single synagogue in any one town; and they were required to wear a special cap to distinguish them from the Christians. The latter were forbidden, under penalty of excommunication, to invite Jews to feasts or other entertainments, and were forbidden also to buy meat or other provisions from Jews, for fear of being poisoned. The council furthermore confirmed the regulations under which Jews were not allowed to keep Christian servants, to lease taxes or customs duties, or to hold any public office. At the Council of Ofen held in 1279 the wearing of a red badge was prescribed for the Jews, and the foregoing provisions were reaffirmed.

=== Prosperity in a reunited Poland: 1320–1385 ===
Though the Catholic clergy continued to spread the religious hatred, the contemporary rulers were not inclined to accept the edicts of the Church, and the Jews of Poland were for a long time allowed their rights. Władysław I the Elbow-high, who ascended the Polish throne in 1320, endeavored to establish a uniform legal code throughout the land. With the general laws he assured the Jews safety and freedom and placed them on equality with the Christians. They dressed like the Christians, wearing garments similar to those of the nobility, and, like the latter, also wore gold chains and carried swords. The king likewise framed laws for the lending of money to Christians.

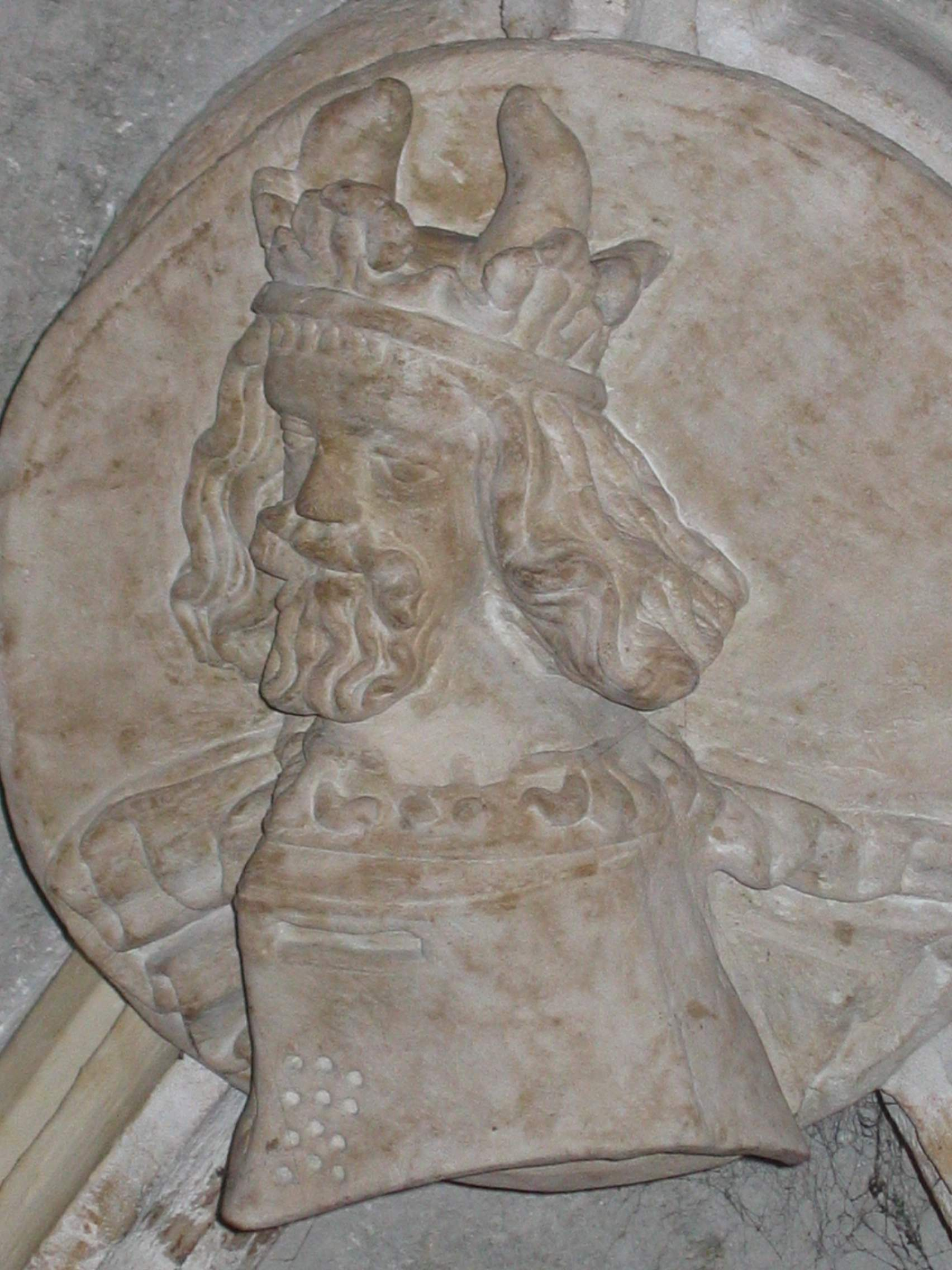
Casimir III the Great treated the Jews of Poland well, and was known as the King of the Serfs and Jews.

In 1334, Casimir III the Great (1310–1370) amplified and expanded Boleslaw's old charter with the Wislicki Statute. Casimir was especially friendly to the Jews, and his reign is regarded as an era of great prosperity for Polish Jewry. His improved charter was even more favorable to the Jews than was Boleslaw's, insofar as it safeguarded some of their civil rights in addition to their commercial privileges. This far-sighted ruler sought to employ the town and rural populations as checks upon the growing power of the aristocracy. He regarded the Jews not simply as an association of money-lenders, but as a part of the nation, into which they were to be incorporated for the formation of a homogeneous body politic. For his attempts to uplift the masses, including the Jews, Casimir was surnamed by his contemporaries "King of the serfs and Jews."

Nevertheless, while for the greater part of Casimir's reign the Jews of Poland enjoyed tranquility, toward its close they were subjected to persecution on account of the Black Death. Massacres occurred at Kalisz, Kraków, Głogów, and other Polish cities along the German frontier, and it is estimated that 10,000 Jews were killed. Compared with the pitiless destruction of their coreligionists in Western Europe, however, the Polish Jews did not fare badly; and the Jewish masses of Germany fled to the more hospitable lands of Poland, where the interests of the laity still remained more powerful than those of the Church.

But under Casimir's successor, Louis I of Hungary (1370–1384), the complaint became general that "justice had disappeared from the land". An attempt was made to deprive the Jews of the protection of the laws. Guided mainly by religious motives, Louis I persecuted them, and threatened to expel those who refused to accept Christianity. His short reign did not suffice, however, to undo the beneficent work of his predecessor; and it was not until the long reign of the Lithuanian Grand Duke and King of Poland Wladislaus II (1386–1434), that the influence of the Church in civil and national affairs increased, and the civic condition of the Jews gradually became less favorable. Nevertheless, at the beginning of Wladislaus' reign the Jews still enjoyed extensive protection of the laws.

== The Jagiellon era: 1385–1572 ==
=== Persecutions of 1385–1492 ===
As a result of the marriage of Władysław II Jagiełło to Jadwiga, daughter of Louis I of Hungary, Lithuania was united with the kingdom of Poland. Under his rule the first extensive persecutions of the Jews in Poland were commenced, and the king did not act to stop these events. It was said that the Jews of Poznań had induced a poor Christian woman to steal from the Dominican order "three hosts", which they "desecrated", and that when the hosts began to bleed, the Jews had thrown them into a ditch, whereupon various "miracles" occurred. When informed of this supposed "desecration", the Bishop of Poznań ordered the Jews to answer the charges. The woman accused the rabbi of Poznań of stealing the hosts, and thirteen elders of the Jewish community fell victim to the superstitious rage of the people. After long-continued torture on the rack they were all burned at the stake. In addition, a permanent fine was imposed on the Jews of Poznań, which they were required to pay annually to the Dominicans. This fine was rigorously collected until the 18th century. The persecution of the Jews was due not only to religious motives, but also to economic reasons, for the Jews had gained control of certain branches of commerce, and the burghers, jealous of their success, desired to rid themselves in one way or another of their objectionable competitors.

The same motives were responsible for the riot of Kraków, instigated by the fanatical priest Budek in 1407. The first outbreak was suppressed by the city magistrates; but it was renewed a few hours later. A vast amount of property was destroyed; many Jews were killed; and their children were baptized. In order to save their lives a number of Jews accepted Christianity. The reform movement of the Czech Hussites intensified religious fanaticism; and the resulting reactionary measures spread to Poland. The influential Polish archbishop Nicholas Tronba, after his return from the Council of Kalisz (1420), over which he had presided, induced the Polish clergy to confirm all the anti-Jewish legislation adopted at the councils of Wrocław and Ofen, and which until then had been rarely carried out. In addition to their previous disabilities, the Jews were now compelled to pay a tax for the benefit of the churches in the precincts in which they were residing, but "in which only Christians should reside."

In 1423 King Wladislaus II issued an edict forbidding the Jews to lend money on notes. In his reign, as in the reign of his successor, Vladislaus III, the ancient privileges of the Jews were almost forgotten. The Jews vainly appealed to Wladislaus II for the confirmation of their old charters. The clergy successfully opposed the renewal of these privileges on the ground that they were contrary to the canonical regulations. To achieve this, the rumor was even spread that the charter claimed to have been granted to the Jews by Casimir III was a forgery, as a Catholic ruler would never have granted full civil rights to "unbelievers."

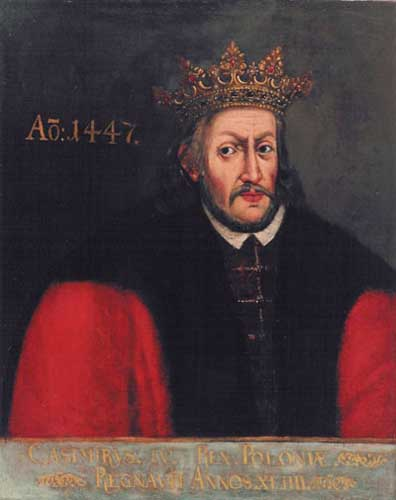
Casimir IV the Jagiellonian confirmed and extended Jewish charters in the second half of the 15th century

The machinations of the clergy were checked by Casimir IV the Jagiellonian (1447–1492). He readily renewed the charter granted to the Jews by Casimir the Great, the original of which had been destroyed in the fire that devastated Poznań in 1447. To a Jewish deputation from the communities of Poznań, Kalisz, Sieradz, Łęczyca, Brest, and Wladislavov which applied to him for the renewal of the charter, he said in his new grant: "We desire that the Jews, whom we protect especially for the sake of our own interests and those of the royal treasury, shall feel contented during our prosperous reign." In confirming all previous rights and privileges of the Jews: the freedom of residence and trade; judicial and communal autonomy; the inviolability of person and property; and protection against arbitrary accusation and attacks; the charter of Casimir IV was a determined protest against the canonical laws, which had been recently renewed for Poland by the Council of Kalisz, and for the entire Catholic world by the Diet of Basel. The charter, moreover, permitted more interaction between Jews and Christians, and freed the former from the jurisdiction of the clerical courts. Strong opposition was created by the King's liberal attitude toward the Jews, and was voiced by the leaders of the clerical party.

The repeated appeals of the clergy, and the defeat of the Polish troops by the Teutonic Knights, which the clergy openly ascribed to the "wrath of God" at Casimir's neglect of the interests of the Church, and his friendly attitude toward the Jews, finally induced the King to accede to the demands which had been made. In 1454 the Statutes of Nieszawa was issued, which granted many privileges to szlachta and included the abolition of the ancient privileges of the Jews "as contrary to divine right and the law of the land." The triumph of the clerical forces was soon felt by the Jewish inhabitants. The populace was encouraged to attack them in many Polish cities; the Jews of Kraków were again the greatest sufferers. In the spring of 1464 the Jewish quarters of the city were devastated by a mob composed of monks, students, peasants, and the minor nobles, who were then organizing a new crusade against the Turks. More than thirty Jews were killed, and many houses were destroyed. Similar disorders occurred in Poznań and elsewhere, notwithstanding the fact that Casimir had fined the Kraków magistrates for having failed to take stringent measures for the suppression of the previous riots.

=== Influx of Jews fleeing persecution: 1492–1548 ===
The policy of the government toward the Jews of Poland was not more tolerant under Casimir's sons and successors, John I Albert (1492–1501) and Alexander the Jagiellonian (1501–1506). John I Albert frequently found himself obliged to judge local disputes between Jewish and Christian merchants. Thus in 1493 he adjusted the conflicting claims of the Jewish merchants and the burghers of Lwów concerning the right to trade freely within the city. On the whole, however, he was not friendly to the Jews. The same may be said of Alexander the Jagiellonian, who had expelled the Jews from Grand Duchy of Lithuania in 1495. To some extent he was undoubtedly influenced in this measure by the expulsion of the Jews from Spain (1492) (the Alhambra decree), which was responsible also for the increased persecution of the Jews in Austria, Bohemia, and Germany, and thus stimulated the Jewish emigration to comparatively much more tolerant Poland. For various reasons Alexander permitted the return of the Jews in 1503, and during the period immediately preceding the Reformation the number of Jews in Poland grew rapidly on account of the anti-Jewish agitation in Germany. Indeed, Poland became the recognized haven of refuge for exiles from western Europe; and the resulting accession to the ranks of the Polish Jewry made it the cultural and spiritual center of the Jewish people. This, as has been suggested by the Jewish historian Dubnow, was rendered possible by the following conditions:

The Jewish population of Poland was at that time greater than that of any other European country; the Jews enjoyed an extensive communal autonomy based on special privileges; they were not confined in their economic life to purely subordinate occupations, as was true of their western coreligionists; they were not engaged solely in petty trade and money-lending, but carried on also an important export trade, leased government revenues and large estates, and followed the handicrafts and, to a certain extent, agriculture; in the matter of residence they were not restricted to ghettos, like their German brethren. All these conditions contributed toward the evolution in Poland of an independent Jewish civilization. Thanks to its social and judicial autonomy, Polish Jewish life was enabled to develop freely along the lines of national and religious tradition. The rabbi became not only the spiritual guide, but also a member of the communal administration Kahal, a civil judge, and the authoritative expounder of the Law. Rabbinism was not a dead letter here, but a guiding religio-judicial system; for the rabbis adjudged civil as well as certain criminal cases on the basis of Talmudic legislation.

The Jews of Poland found themselves obliged to make increased efforts to strengthen their social and economic position, and to win the favor of the king and of the nobility. The conflicts of the different parties, of the merchants, the clergy, the lesser and the higher nobility, enabled the Jews to hold their own. The opposition of the Christian merchants and of the clergy was counterbalanced by the support of the nobility (szlachta), who derived certain economic benefits from the activities of the Jews. By the nihil novi constitution of 1505, sanctioned by Alexander the Jagiellonian, the Szlachta Diets were given a voice in all important national matters. On some occasions the Jewish merchants, when pressed by the lesser nobles, were afforded protection by the king, since they were an important source of royal revenue.

=== Golden age under Sigismund and Sigismund II ===
The most prosperous period in the life of the Polish Jews began with the reign of Sigismund I (1506–1548). In 1507 the king informed the authorities of Lwów that until further notice its Jewish citizens, in view of losses sustained by them, were to be left undisturbed in the possession of all their ancient privileges (Russko-Yevreiski Arkhiv, iii.79). His generous treatment of his physician, Jacob Isaac, whom he made a member of the nobility in 1507, testifies to his liberal views.

But while Sigismund himself was prompted by feelings of justice, his courtiers endeavored to turn to their personal advantage the conflicting interests of the different classes. Sigismund's second wife, Italian born Queen Bona, sold government positions for money; and her favorite, the Voivode (district governor) of Kraków, Piotr Kmita, accepted bribes from both sides, promising to further the interests of each at the Sejm (Polish parliament) and with the king. In 1530 the Jewish question was the subject of heated discussions at the Sejm. There were some delegates who insisted on the just treatment of the Jews. On the other hand, some went so far as to demand the expulsion of the Jews from the country, while still others wished to curtail their commercial rights. The Sejm of 1538 in Piotrków Trybunalski elaborated a series of repressive measures against the Jews, who were prohibited from engaging in the collection of taxes and from leasing estates or government revenues, "it being against God's law that these people should hold honored positions among the Christians." The commercial pursuits of the Jews in the cities were placed under the control of the hostile magistrates, while in the villages Jews were forbidden to trade at all. The Sejm also revived the medieval ecclesiastical law compelling the Jews to wear a distinctive badge.

Sigismund II Augustus (1548–1572) followed in the main the tolerant policy of his father. He confirmed the ancient privileges of the Polish Jews, and considerably widened and strengthened the autonomy of their communities. By a decree of August 13, 1551, the Jews of Great Poland were again granted permission to elect a chief rabbi, who was to act as judge in all matters concerning their religious life. Jews refusing to acknowledge his authority were to be subject to a fine or to excommunication; and those refusing to yield to the latter might be executed after a report of the circumstances had been made to the authorities. The property of the recalcitrants was to be confiscated and turned in to the crown treasury. The chief rabbi was exempted from the authority of the voivode and other officials, while the latter were obliged to assist him in enforcing the law among the Jews.

The favorable attitude of the King and of the enlightened nobility could not prevent the growing animosity against the Jews in certain parts of the kingdom. The Reformation movement stimulated an anti-Jewish crusade by the Catholic clergy, who preached vehemently against all "heretics": Lutherans, Calvinists, and Jews. In 1550 the papal nuncio Alois Lipomano, who had been prominent as a persecutor of the Neo-Christians in Portugal, was delegated to Kraków to strengthen the Catholic spirit among the Polish nobility. He warned the King of the evils resulting from his tolerant attitude toward the various non-believers in the country. Seeing that the Polish nobles, among whom the Reformation had already taken strong root, paid but scant courtesy to his preachings, he initiated a blood libel in the town of Sochaczew. Sigismund pointed out that papal bulls had repeatedly asserted that all such accusations were without any foundation whatsoever; and he decreed that henceforth any Jew accused of having committed a murder for ritual purposes, or of having stolen a host, should be brought before his own court during the sessions of the Sejm. Sigismund II Augustus also granted autonomy to the Jews in the matter of communal administration and laid the foundation for the power of the Qahal.

In 1569 Union of Lublin Lithuania strengthened its ties with Poland, as the previous personal union was peacefully transformed into a unique federation of Polish–Lithuanian Commonwealth. The death of Sigismund Augustus (1572) and thus the termination of the Jagiellon dynasty necessitated the election of his successor by the elective body of all the nobility (szlachta). During the interregnum szlachta has passed the Warsaw Confederation act which guaranteed unprecedented religious tolerance to all citizens of the Commonwealth. Meanwhile, the neighboring states were deeply interested in the elections, each hoping to insure the choice of its own candidate. The pope was eager to assure the election of a Catholic, lest the influences of the Reformation should become predominant in Poland. Catherine de' Medici was laboring energetically for the election of her son Henry of Anjou. But in spite of all the intrigues at the various courts, the deciding factor in the election was the influence of Solomon Ashkenazi, then in charge of the foreign affairs of Ottoman Empire. Henry of Anjou was elected, which was of deep concern to the liberal Poles and the Jews, as he was the infamous mastermind of the St. Bartholomew's Day Massacre. Therefore, Polish nobility forced him to sign the Henrician articles and pacta conventa, guarantying the religious tolerance in Poland, as a condition of acceptance of the throne (those documents would be subsequently signed by every other elected Polish king). However, Henry soon secretly fled to France after a reign in Poland of only a few months, in order to succeed his deceased brother Charles IX on the French throne.

== The Polish–Lithuanian Commonwealth: 1572–1795 ==
=== Jewish learning and culture during the early Polish–Lithuanian Commonwealth ===
Yeshivas were established, under the direction of the rabbis, in the more prominent communities. Such schools were officially known as gymnasia, and their rabbi-principals as rectors. Important yeshivots existed in Kraków, Poznań, and other cities. Jewish printing establishments came into existence in the first quarter of the 16th century. In 1530 a Hebrew Pentateuch (Torah) was printed in Kraków; and at the end of the century the Jewish printing-houses of that city and Lublin issued a large number of Jewish books, mainly of a religious character. The growth of Talmudic scholarship in Poland was coincident with the greater prosperity of the Polish Jews; and because of their communal autonomy educational development was wholly one-sided and along Talmudic lines. Exceptions are recorded, however, where Jewish youth sought secular instruction in the European universities. The learned rabbis became not merely expounders of the Law, but also spiritual advisers, teachers, judges, and legislators; and their authority compelled the communal leaders to make themselves familiar with the abstruse questions of Jewish law. Polish Jewry found its views of life shaped by the spirit of Talmudic and rabbinical literature, whose influence was felt in the home, in school, and in the synagogue.

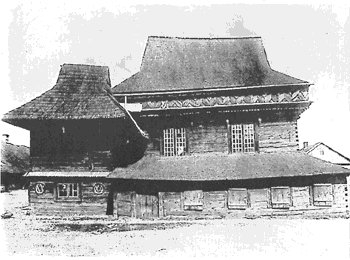
Synagogue in Zabłudlów, built in the late 17th century.

In the first half of the 16th century the seeds of Talmudic learning had been transplanted to Poland from Bohemia, particularly from the school of Jacob Pollak, the creator of Pilpul ("sharp reasoning"). Shalom Shachna (c. 1500–1558), a pupil of Pollak, is counted among the pioneers of Talmudic learning in Poland. He lived and died in Lublin, where he was the head of the yeshivah which produced the rabbinical celebrities of the following century. Shachna's son Israel became rabbi of Lublin on the death of his father, and Shachna's pupil Moses Isserles (known as the ReMA) (1520–1572) achieved an international reputation among the Jews as the co-author of the Shulkhan Arukh, (the "Code of Jewish Law"). His contemporary and correspondent Solomon Luria (1510–1573) of Lublin also enjoyed a wide reputation among his coreligionists; and the authority of both was recognized by the Jews throughout Europe. Among the famous pupils of Isserles should be mentioned David Gans and Mordecai Jaffe, the latter of whom studied also under Luria. Another distinguished rabbinical scholar of that period was Eliezer b. Elijah Ashkenazi (1512–1585) of Kraków. His Ma'ase ha-Shem (Venice, 1583) is permeated with the spirit of the moral philosophy of the Sephardic school, but is extremely mystical. At the end of the work he attempts to forecast the coming of the Jewish Messiah in 1595, basing his calculations on the Book of Daniel. Such Messianic dreams found a receptive soil in the unsettled religious conditions of the time. The new sect of Socinians or Unitarians, which denied the Trinity and which, therefore, stood near to Judaism, had among its leaders Simon Budny, the translator of the Bible into Polish, and the priest Martin Czechowic. Heated religious disputations were common, and Jewish scholars participated in them. At the same time, the Kabbalah had become entrenched under the protection of Rabbinism; and such scholars as Mordecai Jaffe and Yoel Sirkis devoted themselves to its study. The mystic speculations of the kabbalists prepared the ground for Sabbatianism, and the Jewish masses were rendered even more receptive by the great disasters that over-took the Jews of Poland during the middle of the 17th century such as the Cossack Chmielnicki Uprising against Poland during 1648–1654.

=== The beginning of decline ===
Stephen Báthory (1576–1586) was now elected king of Poland; and he proved both a tolerant ruler and a friend of the Jews. On February 10, 1577, he sent orders to the magistrate of Pozna directing him to prevent class conflicts, and to maintain order in the city. His orders were, however, of no avail. Three months after his manifesto a riot occurred in Poznań. Political and economic events in the course of the 16th century forced the Jews to establish a more compact communal organization, and this separated them from the rest of the urban population; indeed, although with few exceptions they did not live in separate ghettos, they were nevertheless sufficiently isolated from their Christian neighbors to be regarded as strangers. They resided in the towns and cities, but had little to do with municipal administration, their own affairs being managed by the rabbis, the elders, and the dayyanim or religious judges. These conditions contributed to the strengthening of the Kahal organizations. Conflicts and disputes, however, became of frequent occurrence, and led to the convocation of periodical rabbinical congresses, which were the nucleus of the central institution known in Poland, from the middle of the 16th to the middle of the 18th century, as the Council of Four Lands.

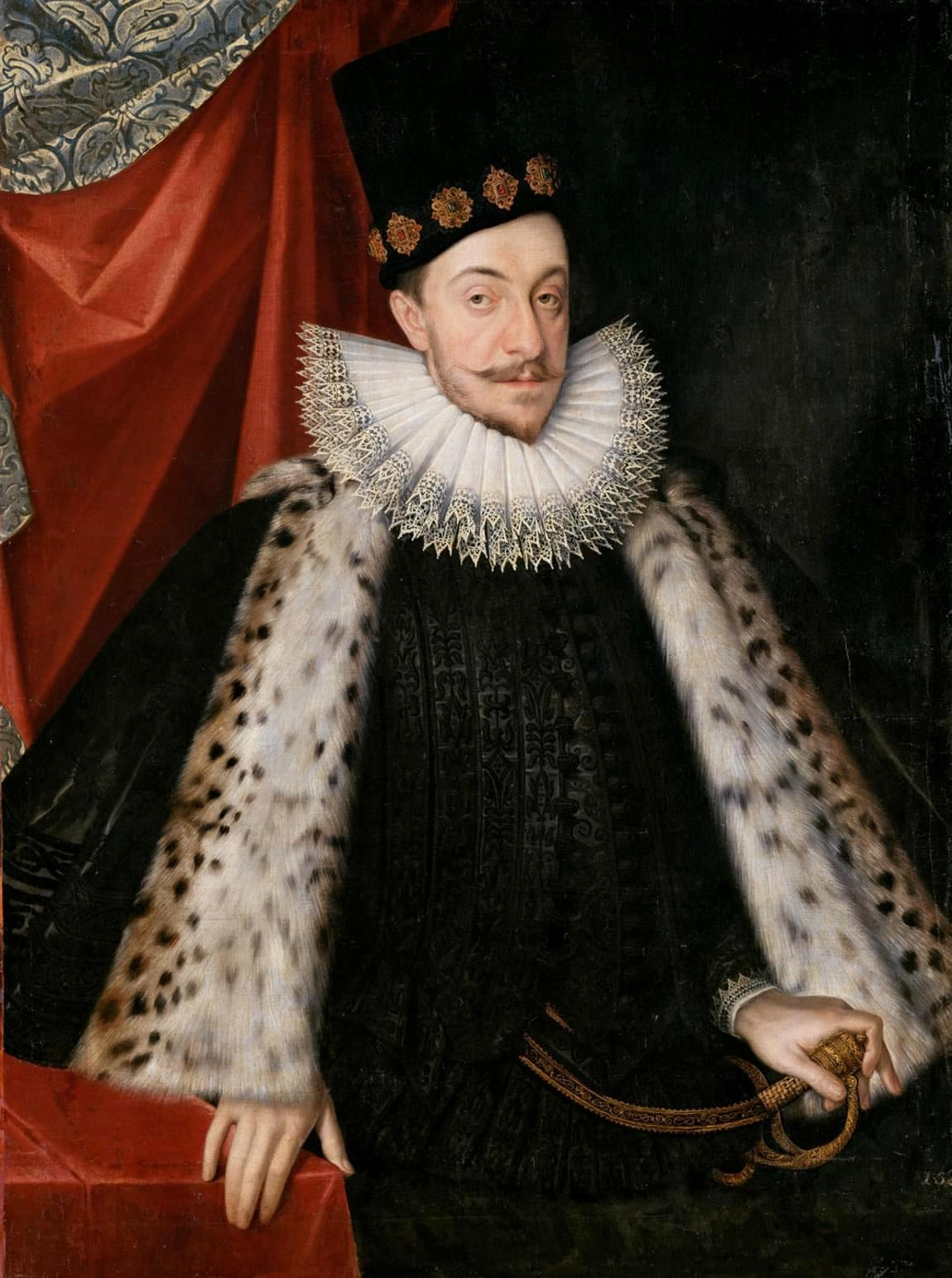
Under the rule of Sigismund III Vasa, the privileges of all non-Catholics in the Polish–Lithuanian Commonwealth were limited.

The Catholic reaction which with the aid of the Jesuits and the Council of Trent spread throughout Europe finally reached Poland. The Jesuits and counterreformation found a powerful protector in Báthory's successor, Sigismund III Vasa (1587–1632). Under his rule the "Golden Freedom" of the Polish szlachta gradually became perverted; government by the liberum veto undermined the authority of the Sejm; and the stage was set for the degeneration of unique democracy and religious tolerance of the Commonwealth into anarchy and intolerance. However, the dying spirit of the republic (Rzeczpospolita) was still strong enough to check somewhat the destructive power of Jesuitism, which under an absolute monarchy, like those in Western Europe, have led to drastic anti-Jewish measures similar to those that had been taken in Spain. However, in Poland Jesuits were limited only to propaganda. Thus while the Catholic clergy was the mainstay of the anti-Jewish forces, the king, forced by the Protestant szlachta, remained at least in semblance the defender of the Jews. Still, the false accusations of ritual murder against the Jews recurred with growing frequency, and assumed an "ominous inquisitional character." The papal bulls and the ancient charters of privilege proved generally of little avail as protection. Uneasy conditions persisted during the reign of Sigismund's son, Władysław IV Vasa (1632–1648).

=== Cossacks' uprising ===
In 1648 the Commonwealth was devastated by the several conflicts, in which the Commonwealth lost over a third of its populations (over 3 million people), and Jewish losses were counted in hundreds of thousands. First, the Chmielnicki Uprising when Bohdan Khmelnytsky's Cossacks massacred tens of thousands of Jews and Poles in the eastern and southern areas he controlled (today's Ukraine). It is recorded that Chmielncki told the people that the Poles had sold them as slaves "into the hands of the accursed Jews". The precise number of dead may never be known, but the decrease of the Jewish population during that period is estimated at 100,000 to 200,000, which also includes emigration, deaths from diseases and jasyr (captivity in the Ottoman Empire).

Then the incompetent politics of the elected House of Vasa kings brought the weakened state to its knees, as it was invaded by the Swedish Empire in what became known as The Deluge. The kingdom of Poland proper, which had hitherto suffered but little either from the Chmielnicki Uprising or from the recurring invasion of the Russians and Ottomans, now became the scene of terrible disturbances (1655–1658). Charles X of Sweden, at the head of his victorious army, overran Poland; and soon the whole country, including the cities of Kraków and Warsaw, was in his hands. The Jews of Great and Little Poland found themselves torn between two sides: those of them who were spared by the Swedes were attacked by the Poles, who accused them of aiding the enemy. The Polish general Stefan Czarniecki, in his flight from the Swedes, devastated the whole country through which he passed and treated the Jews without mercy. The Polish partisan detachments treated the non-Polish inhabitants with equal severity. Moreover, the horrors of the war were aggravated by pestilence, and the Jews and townsfolk of the districts of Kalisz, Kraków, Poznań, Piotrków, and Lublin perished en masse by the sword of the sieging armies and the plague. Certain Jewish writers of the day were convinced that the home and protection which the Jews had for a long time enjoyed in Poland were lost to them forever.

Some of these apprehensions proved to be unfounded. As soon as the disturbances had ceased, the Jews began to return and to rebuild their destroyed homes; and while it is true that the Jewish population of Poland had decreased and become impoverished, it still was more numerous than that of the Jewish colonies in Western Europe. Poland remained as the spiritual center of Judaism; and the remarkable vitality of the Jews manifested itself in the fact that in a comparatively short time they managed to recuperate from their terrible trials. King John II Casimir (1648–1668) endeavored to compensate the impoverished people for their sufferings and losses, as is evidenced by a decree granting the Jews of Kraków the rights of free trade (1661); and similar privileges, together with temporary exemption from taxes, were granted to many other Jewish communities, which had suffered most from the Russo-Swedish invasion. John Casimir's successor, King Michael Korybut Wiśniowiecki (1669–1673), also granted some privileges to the Jews. This was partly due to the efforts of Moses Markowitz, the representative of the Jewish communities of Poland. The heroic King John III Sobieski (1674–1696) was in general very favorably inclined toward the Jews; but the clergy and Catholic nobility deprecated such friendliness toward "infidels."

== See also ==
- History of the Jews in Poland
  - History of the Jews in Poland before the 18th century
  - History of the Jews in 18th-century Poland
  - History of the Jews in 19th-century Poland
  - History of the Jews in 20th-century Poland
  - Jewish-Polish history (1989–present)
  - Timeline of Jewish-Polish history
