= Timeline of Jewish-Polish history =

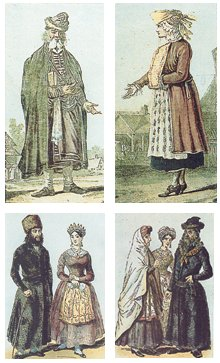
Jewish dress in 17th and 18th century Poland

This article presents the timeline of selected events concerning the history of the Jews in Poland beginning with the formation of the Polish state under its first ruler, Mieszko I of Poland.

== Timeline ==
960 – A Jewish merchant and trader from Spain, Ibrahim ibn Yaqub (Abraham ben Jacob), travels to Poland and writes the first description of the country and the city of Kraków. Jewish traders are very active in Central Europe. Mieszko I mints coins with Hebrew letters on them, though some attribute the coins to the times of Mieszko the Old.

1264 – Polish Prince Boleslaus the Pious issues Statute of Kalisz – The General Charter of Jewish Liberties in Poland, an unprecedented document in medieval history of Europe that allows Jews personal freedom, legal autonomy and separate tribunal for criminal matters as well as safeguards against forced baptism and blood libel. The Charter is ratified again by subsequent Polish Kings: Casimir the Great of Poland in 1334, Casimir IV of Poland in 1453, and Sigismund I the Old of Poland in 1539.

1334 – Casimir the Great of Poland ratifies again the General Charter of Jewish Liberties in Poland.

1343 – Persecuted in Western Europe, the Jews are invited to Poland by King Casimir the Great.

After massive expulsions of Jews from the Western Europe (England, France, Germany, and Spain), they found a refuge in the lands of the Polish–Lithuanian Commonwealth. During the Jagiellon Era Poland became the home to Europe's largest Jewish population, as royal edicts warranting Jewish safety and religious freedom from the 13th century contrasted with bouts of persecution in Western Europe, especially following the Black Death of 1348–1349, blamed by some in the West on Jews themselves. Large parts of Poland suffered relatively little from the outbreak, while the Jewish immigration brought valuable manpower and skills to the rising state. The greatest increase in Jewish numbers occurred in the 18th century, when Jews came to make up 7% of the Polish population.

1453 – Casimir IV of Poland ratifies again the General Charter of Jewish Liberties in Poland.

1500 – Some of the Jews expelled from Spain, Portugal and many German cities move to Poland. By the mid sixteenth century, some eighty percent of the world's Jews lives in Poland, a figure that held steady for centuries.

1501 – King Alexander of Poland readmits Jews to the Grand Duchy of Lithuania.

1525 – The first Jew is promoted to knighthood by king Sigismund I of Poland, without being forced to leave Judaism.

1534 – King Sigismund I of Poland abolishes the law that required Jews to wear special clothes.

1539 – King Sigismund I of Poland ratifies again the General Charter of Jewish Liberties in Poland.

1540–1620 – Immigration of Mizrahi Jews from the Ottoman Empire.

1547 – The first Hebrew Jewish printing house is founded in Lublin.

1567 – The first yeshiva is founded in Poland.

1580 – 1764 First session of the Council of Four Lands (Va'ad Arba' Aratzot) in Lublin, Poland. 70 delegates from Jewish communities (kehillot) meet to discuss taxation and other issues important to the Jewish community.

1606 – Poland first described as "Paradisus Iudaeorum".

1623 – The first time a separate Jewish Diet (Va'ad) for the Grand Duchy of Lithuania is convened.

1632 – King Władysław IV Vasa forbids Anti-Semitic books and printings.

1633 – Jews of Poznań are granted a privilege of forbidding Christians to enter into their city quarter.

1648 – Jewish population of Poland reaches 450,000 or 60% of the world Jewish population. In Bohemia Jews number 40,000 and in Moravia 25,000. The worldwide Jewish population is estimated at 750,000.

1648 – 1655 The Ukrainian Cossack Bohdan Khmelnytsky leads Uprising resulting in massacres of Polish szlachta and Jewry that leaves ca. 65,000 Jews dead and similar number of szlachta also. The total decrease in the number of Jews is estimated at 100,000. Poland loses 40% of her population during The Deluge.

1750 – Jewish population of Poland reaches 750,000 which constitutes around 70% of the Jewish population in the world which is estimated at 1,200,000.

1759 – Unprecedented event of the voluntary conversion of around 3,000 of the followers of Jacob Frank who convert to Catholicism and are accepted into the ranks of Polish nobility szlachta with all the social benefits.

1773–1795 – Three partitions of Poland between imperial Russia, the Kingdom of Prussia and imperial Austria. Old Polish privileges of Jewish communities are denounced.

1831 – November Uprising against Russian. Small Jewish militia units take part in the defence of Warsaw against Russians.

1860–1863 – Jews participate in patriotic manifestations in Warsaw.

1863 – Small groups of Jews take part in January Uprising January Uprising.

1862 – The privileges of some cities in Russia forbidding Jews to settle down in them are denounced.

1880 – World Jewish population numbers around 7.7 million, 90% of which in Europe (mostly Eastern Europe), and around 3.5 million in the former Polish provinces.

1897 – The first Russian census numbers 5,200,000 Jews plus 4,900,000 in the Pale. The Kingdom of Poland has 1,300,000 Jews or 14% of its population.

1918 – Poland regains independence after 123 years. Jews are granted equal rights in independent Poland.

1921 – Polish-Soviet peace treaty in Riga. Citizens of both sides are given rights to choose the country. Hundreds of thousands of Jews, especially shopkeepers or other professionals who are forbidden to work in the Soviet Union, settle in Poland.

1924 – 2,989,000 Jews according to a census by religion in Poland (10,5% of total). Jewish youth constitutes 23% of students of high schools and 26% of university students.

1930 – The world Jewry population numbers 15,000,000, of which the largest numbers live in the USA (4,000,000), Poland (3,500,000 = 11% of total), Soviet Union (2,700,000 = 20% of total), Romania (1,000,000 = 6% of total) and Palestine (175,000 = 1.2% of total).

1933–1939 – German Jews attempt to emigrate, but almost all countries close borders for Jews, including United Kingdom and USA. Most Jews find a temporary asylum in Poland.

1939–1945 – World War II and the Holocaust (Ha Shoah). Germans in occupied Poland built six major death camps: Auschwitz II (Auschwitz-Birkenau), Chełmno, Belzec, Majdanek, Sobibor, and Treblinka.

1946 – The Kielce pogrom.

1945–1948 – Tens of thousands of Holocaust survivors leave Poland for Israel and the United States.

1964 – The Second Vatican Council states in its Nostra aetate Declaration, that the Jews are not responsible for the death of Christ.

1968 – Communist regime-sponsored anti-Zionist campaign in Poland. Many Polish Jews emigrate.

Mid 1970s-present – Growing revival of Klezmer music (The folk music of European Jews). (, ) and Yiddish culture.

1988 – The first Festival of Jewish Culture in Kraków. In 2012, the nine-day Festival attracts around 40,000 visitors.

1989–present – Reestablishment of several Jewish communities in Poland, most notably in Warsaw, Kraków, Gdańsk and Wrocław.

2006 – Jewish population in Poland is approximately 25,000. (Jewish population) Many Polish Jews are of mixed background (Jewish and Catholic) and discover their Jewish identity later in life.

2010 – Jewish population in Poland is approximately 50,000.

== See also ==
- History of the Jews in Poland
  - History of the Jews in Poland before the 18th century
  - History of the Jews in 18th-century Poland
  - History of the Jews in 19th-century Poland
  - History of the Jews in 20th-century Poland
  - Jewish-Polish history (1989–present)
- Timeline of Polish history
- Timeline of Jewish history in Lithuania and Belarus
