= History of Poland (1945–1989) =

Communist Poland
- 1945–1989
World War II	Third Polish Republic
- Location: Poland
- Leaders: List: Bolesław Bierut; Edward Ochab; Władysław Gomułka; Edward Gierek; Stanisław Kania; Wojciech Jaruzelski
- Key events: List: Provisional Government; Yalta Conference; Provisional Government of National Unity; Potsdam Conference; Anti-Communist resistance; Three Times Yes; 1947 elections; Small Constitution; July Constitution; 1956 protests; Polish October; 1968 events; 1970 protests; 1976 protests; Solidarity; Martial law; Round Table; 1989 elections

The history of Poland from 1945 to 1989 spans the period of Marxist–Leninist regime in Poland after the end of World War II. These years, while featuring general industrialization, urbanization and many improvements in the standard of living,^{[a1]} were marred by early Stalinist repressions, social unrest, political strife and severe economic difficulties. Near the end of World War II, the advancing Soviet Red Army, along with the Polish Armed Forces in the East, pushed out the Nazi German forces from occupied Poland. In February 1945, the Yalta Conference sanctioned the formation of a provisional government of Poland from a compromise coalition, until postwar elections. Joseph Stalin, the leader of the Soviet Union, manipulated the implementation of that ruling. A practically communist-controlled Provisional Government of National Unity was formed in Warsaw by ignoring the Polish government-in-exile based in London since 1940.

During the subsequent Potsdam Conference in July–August 1945, the three major Allies ratified a massive westerly shift of Poland's borders and approved its new territory between the Oder–Neisse line and the Curzon Line. The area of Poland was reduced in comparison to its pre-World War II extent and geographically resembled that of the medieval early Piast dynasty era. Following the destruction of the Polish-Jewish population in the Holocaust, the flight and expulsion of Germans in the west, resettlement of Ukrainians in the east, and the expulsion and resettlement of Poles from the Eastern Borderlands (Kresy), Poland became for the first time in its history an ethnically homogeneous nation-state without prominent minorities. The new government solidified its political power, while the Polish United Workers' Party (PZPR) under Bolesław Bierut gained firm control over the country, which would remain an independent state within the Soviet sphere of influence. The July Constitution was promulgated on 22 July 1952 and the country officially became the Polish People's Republic (PRL).

Following Stalin's death in 1953, a political "thaw" allowed a more liberal faction of the Polish communists, led by Władysław Gomułka, to gain power. By the mid-1960s, Poland began experiencing increasing economic as well as political difficulties. They culminated in the 1968 Polish political crisis and the 1970 Polish protests when a consumer price hike led to a wave of strikes. The government introduced a new economic program based on large-scale loans from western creditors, which resulted in a rise in living standards and expectations, but the program meant growing integration of Poland's economy with the world economy and it faltered after the 1973 oil crisis. In 1976, the government of Edward Gierek was forced to raise prices again which led to the June 1976 protests.

This cycle of repression and reform^{[b]} and the economic-political struggle acquired new characteristics with the 1978 election of Karol Wojtyła as Pope John Paul II. Wojtyła's unexpected elevation strengthened the opposition to the authoritarian and ineffective system of nomenklatura-run state socialism, especially with the pope's first visit to Poland in 1979. In early August 1980, a new wave of strikes resulted in the founding of the independent trade union "Solidarity" (Solidarność) led by Lech Wałęsa. The growing strength and activity of the opposition caused the government of Wojciech Jaruzelski to declare martial law in December 1981. However, with the reforms of Mikhail Gorbachev in the Soviet Union, increasing pressure from the West, and dysfunctional economy, the regime was forced to negotiate with its opponents. The 1989 Round Table Talks led to Solidarity's participation in the 1989 election. Its candidates' striking victory gave rise to the first of the succession of transitions from communist rule in Central and Eastern Europe. In 1990, Jaruzelski resigned from the presidency following the presidential election and was succeeded by Wałęsa.

== Establishment of communist-ruled Poland (1944–1948) ==
=== Border and population shifts ===
Poland's old and new borders, 1945

Before World War II, a third of Poland's population was composed of ethnic minorities. Poland had about 35 million inhabitants in 1939, but fewer than 24 million within its borders in 1946. Of the remaining population, over three million were ethnic minorities such as Germans, Ukrainians and Jews, most of whom soon left Poland. Poland suffered the heaviest proportionate human losses in World War II, some 16–17 percent of its population. Estimated deaths of Polish citizens from war-related causes between 1939 and 1945 range up to 6 million. This approximate figure includes 3 million Polish Jews victims. Ethnically Polish victims numbered perhaps 2 million.

Historical minorities in Poland were most significantly affected, and Poland's multiethnic diversity, reflected in prior national censuses was all but gone within a few years after the war. The Polish educated class suffered greatly. Many of the country's pre-war social and political elite perished or were dispersed.

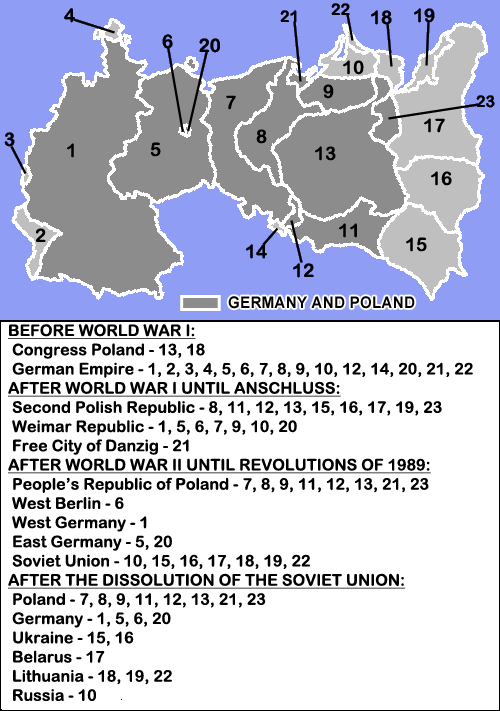
Map showing the different borders and territories of Poland and Germany during the 20th century, with the current areas of Germany and Poland in dark gray

The reconstruction of Poland was accompanied by the struggle of the new government for centralized authority, further complicated by widespread mistrust of the new regime and disputes over Poland's postwar borders, not firmly established until mid-1945. Soviet forces plundered of the former eastern territories of Germany transferred to Poland, stripping them of valuable industrial equipment, infrastructure and factories, assets they set to Russia.

After Soviet annexation of the Kresy territories east of the Curzon Line, about 2 million Poles were moved, transferred or expelled into the new western and northern territories east of the Oder–Neisse line, transferred from Germany to Poland under the Potsdam Agreement. Others stayed in what had become the Soviet Union and more went to Poland after 1956. Additional settlement with people from central Poland brought the number of Poles in what the government called the Recovered Territories up to 5 million by 1950. Most of the former German population of 10 million had fled or been expelled to post-war Germany by 1950: about 4.4 million in the final stages of the war and 3.5 million removed by Polish authorities in 1945–1949. The expulsion of the Germans was the result of Allied decisions finalized in Potsdam.^{[b1]}

With the expulsion of Ukrainians and Belarusians from Poland to the Soviet Union and the 1947 Operation Vistula dispersing the remaining Ukrainians in Poland, and with most of the Polish Jews exterminated by Nazi Germany during the Holocaust and many of the survivors emigrating to the West and to newly created Israel, Poland for the first time became an ethnically homogeneous nation-state. Government-imposed and voluntary migrations amounted to one of the greatest demographic upheavals in European history.

Unlike other European countries, Poland continued the extensive prosecution of both Nazi perpetrators and their collaborators into the 1950s. According to Alexander Prusin, Poland was the most consistent in investigating and prosecuting war crimes among the post-war communist nations; between 1944 and 1985 Polish courts tried over 20,000 defendants including 5,450 German nationals.

=== Rebuilding of infrastructure and economy ===
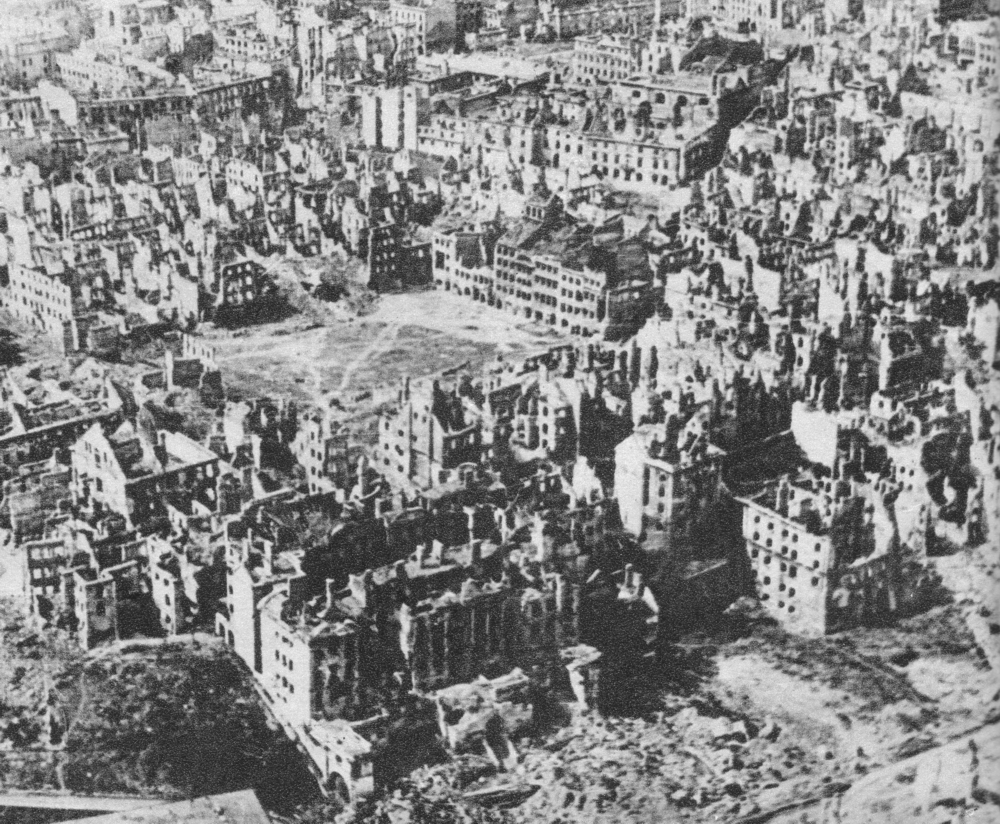
Destroyed Warsaw, January 1945

Poland suffered catastrophic damage to its infrastructure during the war, which caused it to lag even further behind the West in its industrial output. The losses in national resources and infrastructure amounted to over 30% of the pre-war potential. Poland's capital of Warsaw was among the most devastated cities – over 80 percent destroyed in the aftermath of the Warsaw Uprising of 1944. The Polish state acquired more highly developed western territories and lost the more economically backward eastern regions. Already in 1948 the prewar level of industrial production was exceeded in global and per capita terms during the Three-Year Plan (Plan Trzyletni), implemented first and fueled by the collective desire to rebuild shattered lives. The Three-Year Plan was the work of the Central Planning Office led by Czesław Bobrowski and PPR economist Hilary Minc, who declared the need to preserve elements of market capitalism. Standard of living of the population of Poland markedly improved. Soviet pressure caused the Polish government to reject the American-sponsored Marshall Plan in 1947 and to join the Soviet Union-dominated Comecon in 1949.

Warsaw and other ruined cities were cleared of rubble — mainly by hand — and rebuilt with great speed (one of the successes of the Three-Year Plan) at the expense of former German cities like Wrocław, which often provided the needed construction material.

Historian Norman Davies wrote that the new Polish frontiers, from the Polish interests point of view, entirely advantageous, but realized at the cost of enormous suffering and specious justifications. The radically new Eastern European borders constituted a "colossal feat of political engineering", but could not be derived from immemorial historical determinations, as claimed by the communist propaganda.

=== Consolidation of communist power ===
Before the Red Army even entered Poland, the Soviet Union pursued a strategy of eliminating pro-Western resistance there, in order to ensure that Poland would fall under its sphere of influence. In 1943, after the revelation of the Katyn massacre, Stalin suspended relations with the Polish government-in-exile in London. At the Yalta Conference in February 1945, the Soviet Union agreed to allow a coalition government of communists, including the Polish Workers' Party (Polska Partia Robotnicza, PPR), and Polish pro-Western elements in exile and in Poland, and subsequently to arrange for free elections to be held.

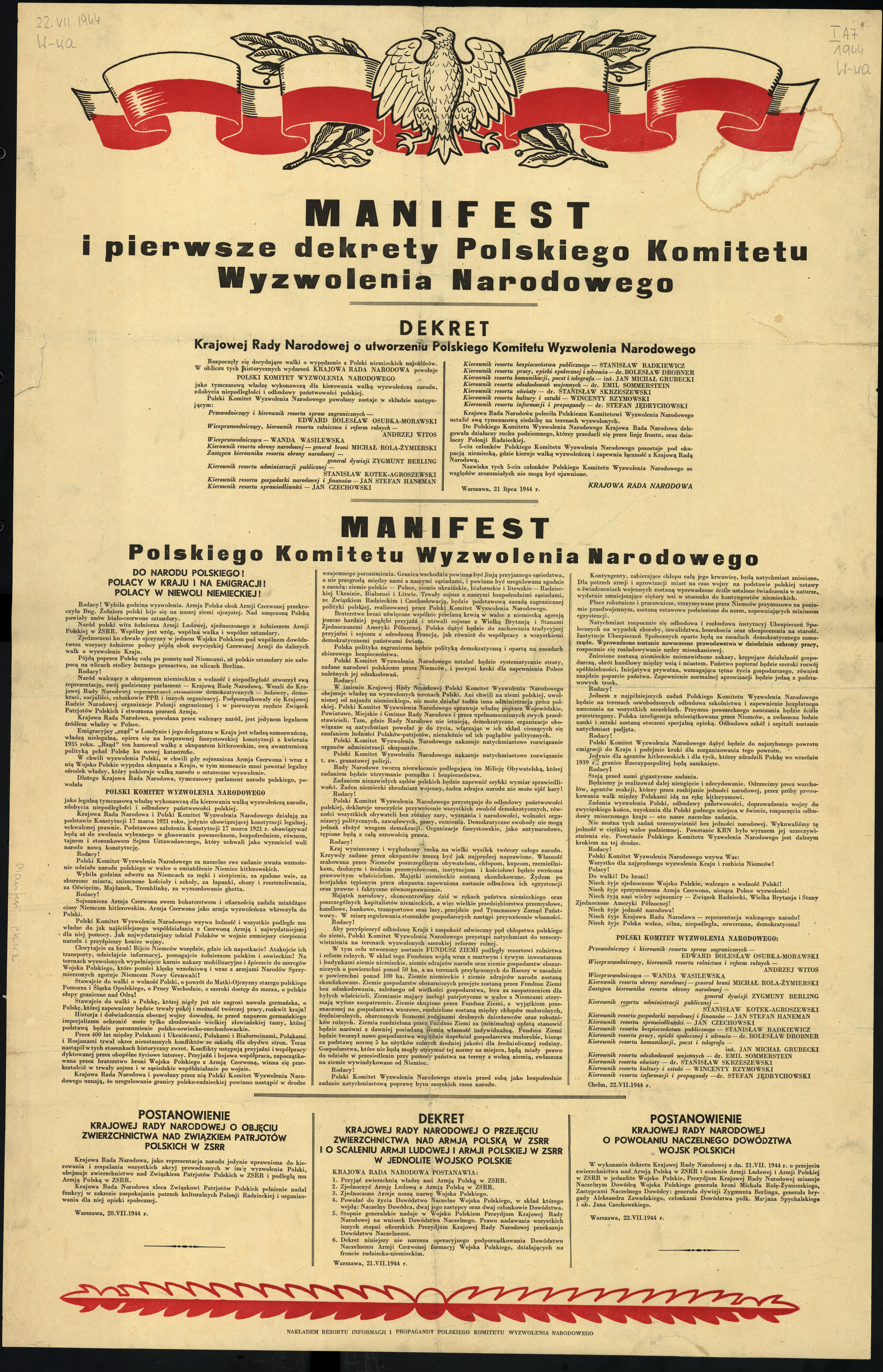
The PKWN Manifesto, officially issued on 22 July 1944. In reality it was not finished until mid-August, after the Polish communist Moscow group was joined by the late-arriving Warsaw group, led by Władysław Gomułka and Bolesław Bierut.

The prewar Communist Party of Poland was eliminated in Stalin's purges in 1938; some five thousand Polish communists were sent to Russia and killed), a group of survivors led by Marceli Nowotko, Bolesław Mołojec and Paweł Finder in 1941 convinced the Soviets to reestablish a Polish party. The conspiratorial core of the new Polish Workers' Party assembled in Warsaw in January 1942, and after the deaths or arrests of its leaders there, Władysław Gomułka emerged as the PPR's first secretary by the end of 1943. Gomułka was a dedicated communist in the tradition of the Polish leftist movement. He loathed the Soviet practices he experienced while being trained in Russia and Ukraine in the 1930s, but was convinced of the historic necessity of allying with the Soviet Union. He may have survived the purges because of his imprisonment in Poland for illegal labor-organizing activities in 1938–39.

Gomułka remained in Poland throughout the German occupation, and was not part of the circle Stalin and Wanda Wasilewska organized in the Soviet Union around the Union of Polish Patriots. Gomułka's party was small in comparison to other political groups in the Poland of 1945.

With the liberation of Polish territories and the failure of the Home Army's Operation Tempest in 1944, control over what was to become post-war Poland passed from Nazi Germany to the Red Army, and from the Red Army to Polish communists, who formed the Polish Committee of National Liberation (Polski Komitet Wyzwolenia Narodowego, PKWN), an early government in existence from late July 1944 in Lublin. Polish communists became the most influential Polish factor in the politics of the new Poland, despite tiny support initially. The PKWN recognized the legal continuity of the March Constitution of Poland, as opposed to the April Constitution.

On 6 September 1944, the PKWN issued its momentous land reform decree, which fundamentally altered the antiquated social and economic structure of the country. Over one million peasant families benefited from the parcellation of the larger estates.

The communists, favored by the Yalta decisions, enjoyed the advantages of Soviet support within Soviet plans to bring Eastern Europe firmly under the influence of the Soviet Union; they exercised control over crucial government departments such as the security services. Beginning in late 1944, after the defeat of the Warsaw Uprising and the promotion of PKWN populist, the exiled government delegation from London was increasingly seen by Poles as a failed enterprise, its political-military organizations became isolated, and resistance against Communist political and administrative forces decisively weakened. The population, tired of the years of oppression and conflict, found the ideas of the PKWN Manifesto and their progressive implementation increasingly attractive. Beyond land reform, the PKWN Manifesto called for no further radical changes in ownership, and nationalization of industry was not mentioned. Business property was supposed to return to its owners as economic relations became properly regulated. Responding to promulgated slogans, workers in liberated areas starting in 1944 spontaneously took over existing factories, established workers' councils, and undertook reconstruction, activation and production. Considerable struggle and compulsion were necessary for the PPR to claim the factories and enforce its own rules.

The PKWN was reshaped into the Provisional Government of the Republic of Poland (Rząd Tymczasowy Rzeczypospolitej Polskiej, RTRP), which functioned from January 1945 on. This government was headed by Edward Osóbka-Morawski, a socialist, but the communists, mostly non-PPR Soviet employees such as Michał Rola-Żymierski, held a majority of key posts. A Polish-Soviet treaty of friendship and cooperation signed in April 1945 severely limited future Western or émigré impact or internal cooperation with non-communist political forces in Poland.

Postwar Polish communist propaganda poster depicting "The giant and the putrid reactionary midget", meaning the communist People's Army soldier and the pro-Western Home Army soldier, respectively

The Yalta agreement stipulated a governmental union in Poland of "all democratic and anti-Nazi elements". Prime Minister Stanisław Mikołajczyk of the Polish government-in-exile resigned his post in November 1944 and having accepted the Yalta terms, went to Moscow and negotiated with Bolesław Bierut the shape of a "national unity" government". Mikołajczyk, and several other exiled Polish leaders returned to Poland in July 1945.

The new Polish Provisional Government of National Unity (Tymczasowy Rząd Jedności Narodowej, TRJN), as the Polish government was called until the elections of 1947, was established on 28 June 1945. Edward Osóbka-Morawski remained as prime minister, Gomułka became first deputy prime minister and Mikołajczyk second deputy and minister of agriculture. The government was "provisional" and the Potsdam Conference soon declared that free elections must be held and a permanent constitutional system established.

The communists' principal rivals were veteran activists of the Polish Underground State, Mikołajczyk's Polish People's Party (Polskie Stronnictwo Ludowe, PSL), and veterans of the Polish Armed Forces in the West. Mikołajczyk's People's Party, originally a peasant formation, was particularly important because it was legally recognized by the communists and thus could function in the Polish political arena. The People's Party wanted to prevent the communists from monopolizing power and also to eventually establish a parliamentary polity with a market economy by winning the promised elections. Mikołajczyk hoped that an independent Polish state, friendly with the Soviet Union, would be allowed to act as a bridge between the East and the West.

Soviet-oriented parties, backed by the Soviet Red Army and in control of the security forces, held most of the power, concentrated especially in the Polish Workers' Party under Gomułka and Bierut. Bierut represented the influx of appointees to the Polish party coming (during and after the war) from the Soviet Union and imposed by the Soviets, a process accelerated at the time of the PPR Congress of December 1945. The party's membership dramatically increased from perhaps a few thousand in early 1945 to over one million in 1948.

As a show of Soviet domination, sixteen prominent leaders of the Polish anti-Nazi underground were brought to trial in Moscow in June 1945. Their removal from the political scene precluded the possibility of a democratic transition called for by the Yalta agreements. The trial of the defendants, falsely and absurdly accused of collaboration with the Nazis, was watched by British and American diplomats without protest. The absence of the expected death sentences was their relief. The exiled government in London, after Mikołajczyk's resignation led by Tomasz Arciszewski, ceased to be officially recognized by Great Britain and the United States on 5 July 1945.

In the years 1945–47, approximately 500,000 Soviet soldiers were deployed across Polish territory. Between 1945 and 1948, the Soviet authorities incarcerated around 150,000 Poles. Many former Home Army members were apprehended and executed. During the PPR Central Committee Plenum of May 1945, Gomułka complained that the Polish masses regard the Polish communists as the "NKVD's worst agency" and Edward Ochab declared the withdrawal of the Soviet Army from Poland a high priority. But in the meantime tens of thousands of Poles died in the postwar struggle and persecution and tens of thousands were sentenced by courts on fabricated and arbitrary charges or deported to the Soviet Union. The status of Soviet troops in Poland was not legalized until late 1956, when the Polish-Soviet declaration "On the legal status of Soviet forces temporarily stationed in Poland" was signed.

=== Rigged elections, defeat of Mikołajczyk ===
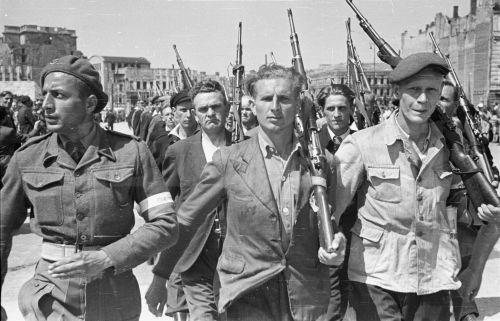
ORMO paramilitary police unit during street parade at the Victory Square, 9 June 1946, Warsaw

Stalin had promised at the Yalta Conference that free elections would be held in Poland. However, the Polish communists, led by Gomułka and Bierut, while having no intention of giving up power, were also aware of the limited support they enjoyed among the general population. To circumvent this difficulty, in 1946 a national plebiscite, known as the "Three Times Yes" referendum (Trzy razy tak), was held first, before the parliamentary elections. The referendum comprised three fairly general, but politically charged questions about the Senate, national industries and western borders. It was meant to check and promote the popularity of communist initiatives in Poland. Since most of the important parties at the time were leftist or centrist – and could have easily approved all three options – Mikołajczyk's Polish People's Party (PSL) decided, not to be seen as merging into the government bloc, to ask its supporters to oppose the first one: the abolition of the Senate. The communists voted "Three Times Yes". The partial results, reconstructed by the PSL, showed that the communist side was met with little support on the first question. However, after a campaign marked by electoral fraud and intimidation the communists claimed large majorities on all three questions, which led to the nationalization of industry and state control of economic activity in general, and a unicameral national parliament (Sejm).

The communists consolidated power by gradually whittling away the rights of their non-communist foes, particularly by suppressing the leading opposition party – Mikołajczyk's PSL. In some widely publicized cases, the perceived enemies were sentenced to death on trumped up charges — among them Witold Pilecki, the organizer of the Auschwitz resistance. Leaders of the Home Army and of the Council of National Unity were persecuted. Many resistance fighters were murdered extrajudicially or forced to exile. The opposition members were also harassed by administrative means. Although the ongoing persecution of the former anti-Nazi and right-wing organizations by state security kept some partisans in the forests, the actions of the Ministry of Public Security (known as the UB, Department of Security), NKVD and the Red Army steadily diminished their numbers. The right-wing insurgency radically decreased after the amnesty of July 1945 and faded after the amnesty of February 1947.

By 1946, all rightist parties had been outlawed, and a new pro-government Democratic Bloc was formed in 1947 which included only the Polish Workers' Party and its leftist allies. On 19 January 1947, the first parliamentary elections took place featuring primarily the PPR and allied candidates and a potentially politically potent opposition from the Polish People's Party. However, the PSL's strength and role had already been seriously compromised due to government control and persecution. Election results were adjusted by Stalin to suit the communists, whose bloc claimed 80% of the votes. The British and American governments protested the poll for its blatant violations of the Yalta and Potsdam accords. The rigged elections effectively ended the multiparty system in Poland's politics. After the referendum dress rehearsal, this time the vote fraud was much better concealed and spread into various forms and stages and its actual scale is not known. With all the pressure and manipulations, an NKVD colonel charged with election supervision reported to Stalin that about 50% of the vote was cast for the regime's Democratic Bloc nationwide. In the new Sejm, out of 444 seats, 27 were given to the Polish People's Party of Stanisław Mikołajczyk. He, having declared the results to be falsified, was threatened with arrest or worse and fled the country in October 1947, helped by the US Embassy; other opposition leaders also left. In February, the new Sejm created the Small Constitution of 1947. Over the next two years, the communists monopolized political power in Poland.

=== Polish United Workers' Party and its rule ===
Logo of the Polish United Workers' Party

A force of Polish politics, the long-established Polish Socialist Party (Polska Partia Socjalistyczna PPS), suffered a fatal split at this time, as the ruling Stalinists applied salami tactics to dismember the opposition. Communist politicians cooperated with the left-wing PPS faction led by Józef Cyrankiewicz, prime minister under new president Bierut from in February 1947 on. The socialists' originally tactical decision to collaborate with the communists resulted in their institutional demise. Cyrankiewicz visited Stalin in Moscow in March 1948 to discuss a party merger. The Kremlin, increasingly uncomfortable with Gomułka's communist party leadership, concurred, and Cyrankiewicz secured his own place in Polish politics (until 1972). In December 1948, after Gomułka was removed and Bierut imposed as head of the communist Polish Workers' Party, the PPR and Cyrankiewicz's rump PPS joined ranks to form the Polish United Workers' Party (Polska Zjednoczona Partia Robotnicza, PZPR), which held power for the next four decades. Poland became a de facto one-party state and a satellite state of the Soviet Union. Only two other parties were legal: the United People's Party (ZSL), split from Mikołajczyk's PSL and meant to represent rural communities, and the Alliance of Democrats (SD), a token intelligentsia party.

As the period of Sovietization and Stalinism began, the PZPR was anything but united. The most important split among the communists occurred before the union with the PPS, when the Stalinists forced Gomułka out of the PPR's top office and suppressed his native communist faction. The PZPR became divided into several factions, which espoused different views and methods and sought different degrees of the Polish state's distinction and independence from the Soviet Union. While Marxism–Leninism, the official ideology, was new to Poland, the communist regime continued, in many psychologically and practically important ways, the precepts, methods and manners of past Polish ruling circles, including those of the Sanation, the National Democracy, and 19th century traditions of cooperation with the partitioning powers.

With Poland being a member of the Soviet Bloc, the party's pursuits of power and reform were permanently hindered by the restrictions and limits imposed by the rulers of the Soviet Union, by the resentful attitude of Polish society, conscious of its lack of national independence and freedoms, and by the understanding of the party managers that their positions would terminate once they stop conforming to the requirements of the Soviet alliance (because of both the lack of public support and Soviet reaction). Poland's political history was governed by the mutual dependence of the Soviets and the Polish communists.

The nomenklatura political elite developed. It comprised leaders, administrators and managers within the ruling party structure, in all branches of central and local government and in institutions of all kinds. Nomenklatura members were appointed by the party and exercised political control in all spheres of public life, for example economic development, industry management, or education. For the party, the privileged nomenklatura layer was maintained to assure the proper placement of people who were ideologically reliable and otherwise qualified, but the revisionist dissidents Jacek Kuroń and Karol Modzelewski later described this system as a class dictatorship of central political bureaucracy for its own sake. The Polish public widely approved the many social undertakings of the communist government, including family apartment construction, child care, worker vacation and resorts, health care and full employment policies, but the special privileges granted nomenklatura and the security services were resented.

== Stalinist era (1948–1956) ==
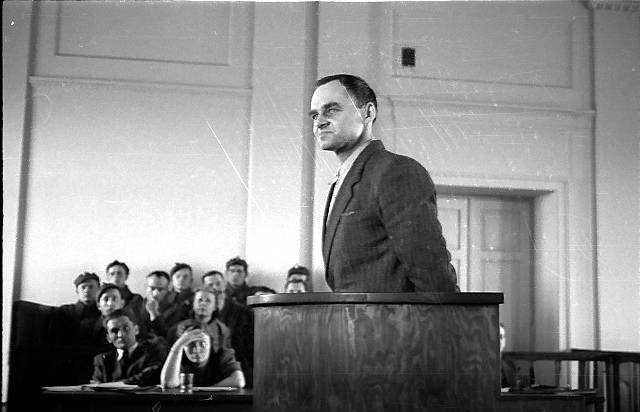
The show trial of Captain Witold Pilecki, sentenced to death and executed May 1948

=== Removal of Gomułka, Stalinist repressions ===
After 1948, like other Eastern Bloc countries, Poland had a Soviet-style political purge of Communist officials accused of "nationalist" or other "deviationist" tendencies. The half-hearted campaign included the arrest and imprisonment of Marian Spychalski in May 1950 and of Michał Rola-Żymierski, five months after Stalin's death. In September 1948 Władysław Gomułka and a group of communist leaders who had also spent the war in Poland was charged with ideological departure from Leninism, and dismissed from the party for opposing Stalin's direct control of the Polish PPR party,. Gomułka, accused of "right-wing nationalist deviations", had indeed emphasized the Polish socialist traditions and severely criticized Rosa Luxemburg's Social Democracy of the Kingdom of Poland and Lithuania (SDKPiL) party for belittling Polish national aspirations. More insidiously, the Soviets claimed Gomułka had participated in an international anti-Soviet conspiracy. He was arrested on the order of Bolesław Bierut by the Ministry of Public Security (MBP) in early August 1951 and interrogated by Roman Romkowski and Anatol Fejgin, as the Soviets demanded. Gomułka was not physically tortured, unlike other communists persecuted under the regime of Bierut, Jakub Berman, and Stalin's other associates. Under interrogation he defiantly defended himself, threatened to reveal "the whole truth" if put on trial, and remained unbroken. Gomułka was imprisoned without the usual show trial and was released in December 1954. Bierut replaced Gomułka as leader of the PPR (and then the PZPR) leader. Gomułka's Polish comrades to the best of their ability and the record of his sometime defiance came in handy when in 1956 there was an opportunity for the Polish party to reassert itself.

Polish communists originating from wartime factions and organizations operating in the Soviet Union under Stalin, such as the Union of Polish Patriots, controlled the Stalinist government. Their leaders at that time included Wanda Wasilewska and Zygmunt Berling. Now that they were in Poland, those who were still politically active and in Russian favor ruled the country, helped by MBP and Soviet "advisers" in every arm of the government and state security forces to guarantee of pro-Soviet policies. The most important was Konstantin Rokossovsky (Konstanty Rokossowski in Polish), defense minister of Poland from 1949 to 1956, Marshal of the Soviet Union and war hero.

Military conscription was introduced following a postwar hiatus and the army soon reached its permanent size of 400,000 men.

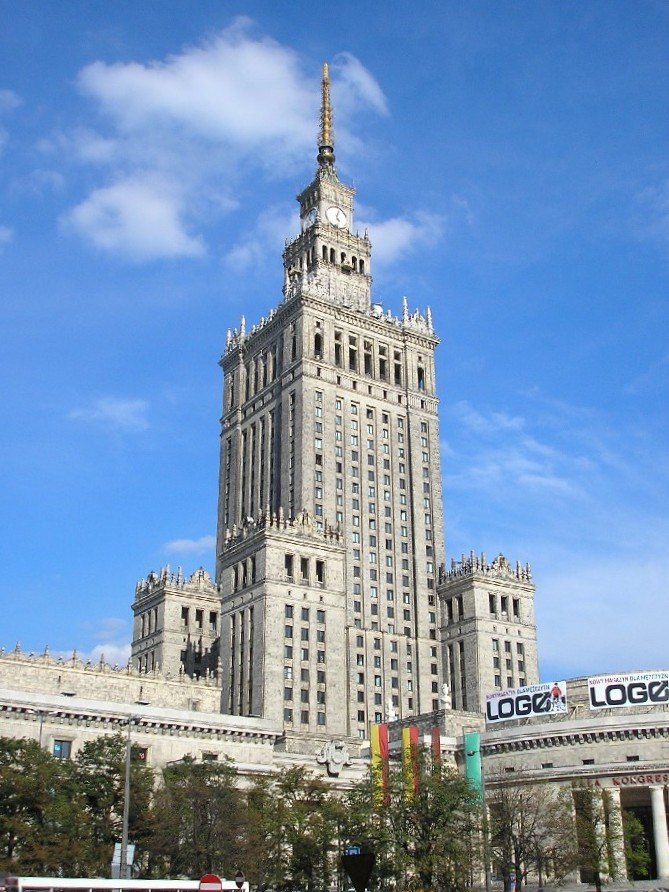
The Palace of Culture and Science in Warsaw, initially called Stalin's Palace, a controversial gift from Soviet leader Joseph Stalin

Soviet-style secret police, including the Department of Security (UB), grew to around 32,000 agents as of 1953. At their Stalinist peak, there was one UB agent for every 800 Polish citizens. The MBP was also in charge of the Internal Security Corps, the Civil Militia (MO), border guards, prison staff and paramilitary police ORMO used for special actions The ORMO began as a popular self-defense effort, a spontaneous reaction to the explosion of crime in the power vacuum of 1944–45. In February 1946, the PPR channeled and formalized this citizen militia movement, creating its ostensibly crime control voluntary ORMO structure.

Mostly in Stalin's lifetime, public prosecutors and judges and functionaries of the Ministry of Public Security and the Main Directorate of Information of the Polish Army committed acts recognized in international law as crimes against humanity and crimes against peace. For example the 1951 Mokotów Prison execution in Warsaw of members of the Freedom and Independence (WiN) organization, former anti-Nazi resistance fighters, came after they voluntarily came forward after an official amnesty. The postwar Polish Army, intelligence forces and police were staffed with Soviet NKVD officers who were stationed in Poland with the Northern Group of Forces until 1956.

Mass arrests continued in the early 1950s. In October 1950, 5,000 people were arrested in one night in "Operation K". In 1952, over 21,000 people were arrested. By the second half of 1952, according to official data, Poland had 49,500 political prisoners. Former Home Army commander Emil August Fieldorf was subjected to several years of brutal persecution in the Soviet Union and Poland before he was executed in February 1953 just before Stalin's death.

Resistance to the Soviet and native Stalinists was widespread among not only the general population but also the ranks of the PZPR, limiting damage from the oppressive system in Poland to much less than in other European communist-ruled countries. According to Norman Davies, political violence after 1947 was not widespread. The Church, although subjected to partial property confiscations, remained largely intact. The very marginalized intelligentsia kept its potential to effect future reforms, the peasantry avoided wholesale collectivization, and remnants of private enterprise survived. Liberalizing changes gradually took place between Stalin's death in 1953 and the Polish October of 1956.

=== Nationalization and centrally planned economy ===
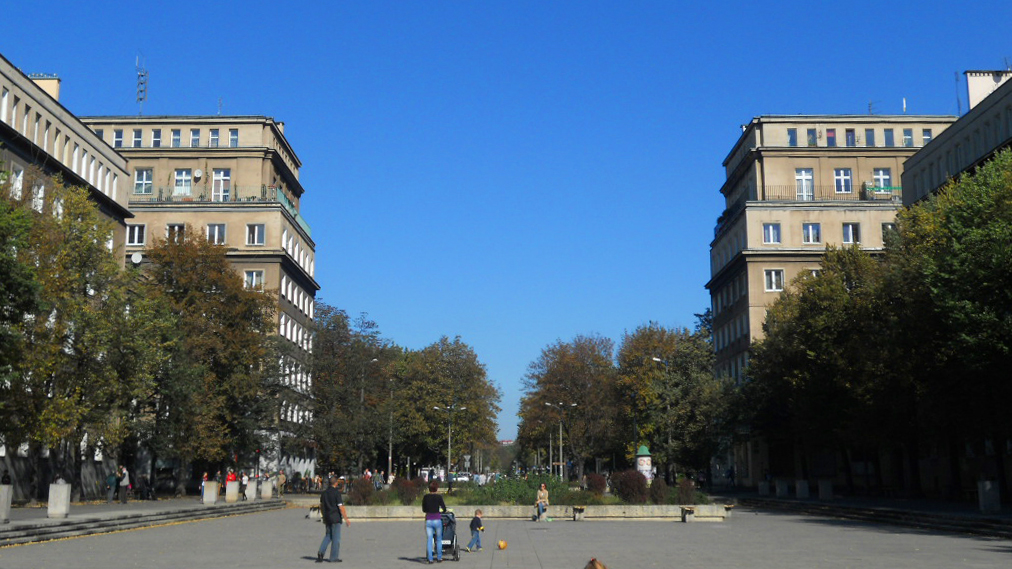
Avenue of the Roses, Nowa Huta

Minister of Industry Hilary Minc, a Marxist economist, in February 1948 attacked the Central Planning Office of Poland as a "bourgeois" remnant, the office was abolished, and the Polish Stalinist economy was born. The government of President Bierut, Prime Minister Cyrankiewicz and Minc embarked on a sweeping economic reforms and national reconstruction. Poland was brought into line with the Soviet model of a "people's republic" and centrally planned command economy, rather than the previous façade of democracy and partial market economy the regime had maintained until 1948.

Ownership of industry, the banking sector and rural property were fundamentally altered by nationalization and the land reform. These changes, implemented in the name of egalitarianism, enjoyed broad societal approval and support.

The structure of Polish economy was established in the late 1940s and the early 1950s. Soviet-style planning begun in 1950 with the Six-Year Plan, focused on rapidly developing heavy industry, ("accelerated industrialization" after the outbreak of the Korean War, driven by Soviet military demands at the expense of many cancelled consumer-oriented investments and the eventually futile collectivization of agriculture.

Among the main projects was the Lenin Steelworks and its supporting "socialist city" of Nowa Huta (New Steel Mill), both built from the scratch in the early 1950s near Kraków, which soon annexed Nowa Huta. The land seized from prewar large landowners was redistributed to poorer peasants, but subsequent attempts to take land from farmers for collectivization were widely resented. In what became known as the battle for trade, private trade and industry were nationalized. Within few years most private shops disappeared. The regime embarked on a campaign of collectivization (State Agricultural Farms were created), although the pace of this change was slower than in other Soviet satellite countries. Poland remained the only Eastern Bloc country where individual peasants continued to dominate agriculture. A Soviet-Polish trade treaty, initiated in January 1948, dictated the dominant direction of Poland's future foreign trade and economic cooperation.

In 1948, the United States announced the Marshall Plan initiative to help rebuild postwar Europe and thus increase its political power there. After initially welcoming the idea, the Polish government declined American help, under pressure from Moscow. Following the Uprising of 1953 in East Germany, the Soviet Union forced Poland to give up its claims to compensation from Germany, which as a result paid no significant war damages to either the Polish state or its citizens.

Despite the lack of American aid, East European "command economies", including Poland, made progress in bridging the historical wealth gap from Western Europe's market economies. The capital accumulation, made the Polish national income grow over 76% in real terms, and agricultural and industrial production more than doubled between 1947 and 1950. Massive social transformations enabled the economic transition and industrialization> Peasants migrated to the cities and became their working class (1.8 million between 1946 and 1955) and the country rapid urbanized> The total population of {Polish cities increased by 3.1 million.^{[c1]} The influx of cheap labor and access to the Soviet market facilitated an accumulation of resources, despite low productivity and insufficient investment in new technologies. The centrally planned socialist economies of Eastern Europe in terms of growth during the postwar years did relatively better than the West, only to sustain economic damage later, especially after the 1973 oil crisis. However, the rise in living standards caused by the earlier industrial dynamics was not comparable to that in the West.

=== Reforms, resistance and beginning of de-Stalinization ===
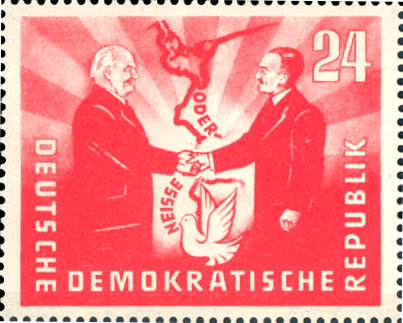
1951 East German stamp commemorative of the Treaty of Zgorzelec establishing the Oder–Neisse line as a "border of peace", featuring the presidents Wilhelm Pieck (GDR) and Bolesław Bierut (Poland)

The last Polish–Soviet territorial exchange took place in 1951. Some 480 km^{2} (185 sq mi) of land along the border were swapped between Poland and the Soviet Union.

The Constitution of the Polish People's Republic was promulgated in July 1952 and the state officially became the Polish People's Republic (PRL). Among the rights it guaranteed was universal free health care. The large state-owned enterprises provided to employees an extensive range of welfare and leisure activities, including housing, sports facilities and hospitals, which started to diminish in the 1970s. In the early 1950s, the Stalinist regime also carried out major changes to the education system. The program of free and compulsory school education for all and the establishment of free institutions of higher learning received much support. The communists screened out what facts and interpretations were to be taught; history and other sciences had to follow Marxist views approved by ideological censorship.

The reforms often brought relief for a significant part of the population. After World War II many people were willing to accept communist rule in exchange for the restoration of relatively normal life; hundreds of thousands joined the communist party and actively supported the regime. Nonetheless, latent popular discontent remained present and many Poles adopted the attitude of "resigned cooperation". Others, like the Freedom and Independence organization that originated from elements of the Home Army and especially the National Armed Forces actively opposed the communists, hoping for a World War III that would liberate Poland. Most people who took up arms against the communist regime had surrendered during the amnesties of 1945 and 1947, but brutal repressions by the secret police continued and some fought well into the 1950s.^{[d]}

The communists further alienated many Poles by persecuting the Catholic Church. The PAX Association created in 1947 and led by the former prewar far-right activist Bolesław Piasecki, attempted to divide the Catholic movement and promote a communist rule-friendly, collaborationist church. The PAX did not get very far in molding the Catholic public opinion, but published numerous books and officially approved daily Catholic press. In 1953 Cardinal Stefan Wyszyński, the Primate of Poland, was placed under house arrest, even though he had been willing to make compromises with the government. In the early 1950s, the war against religion by the secret police led to arrests and persecution of hundreds of religious personalities, culminating in the Stalinist show trial of the Kraków Curia. (See also: Polish anti-religious campaign)

The constitution of 1952 guaranteed on paper all sorts of democratic rights and freedoms. In reality, the country was controlled extra-constitutionally by the Polish United Workers' Party, which used its own rules and practices to supervise all governmental institutions specified in the constitution.

Stalin died in 1953, which was followed by a partial thaw in Poland. Nikita Khrushchev became first secretary of the Communist Party of the Soviet Union. The PZPR's Second Congress deliberated in March 1954. Cyrankiewicz, previously replaced as prime minister by Bierut, was returned to that post (to remain prime minister until December 1970). The Six-Year Plan was adjusted to increase production of items for popular consumption. Khrushchev, present at the Congress, asked Bierut for the reasons of the continuing detention of Gomułka, "a good communist"; Bierut denied having specific knowledge of Gomułka's imprisonment.

Following the defection to the West and revelations of its official Józef Światło, the Ministry of Public Security was abolished in December 1954. Gomułka and his associates were freed from confinement and censorship was slightly relaxed. The two notable periodicals braving the prohibitions were Po prostu ('Simply') and Nowa Kultura ('The New Culture') (Po prostu was closed down and its defenders brutally pacified in October 1957, just one year after Gomułka's rise to power). From early 1955, the Polish press engaged in criticizing the Stalinist recent past and praising the older Polish socialist traditions (social democratic Marxism and national independence). Political discussion clubs were on the rise throughout the country. The party itself appeared to be moving in the social democratic direction. Leftist intellectuals, who had joined the party because of their commitment to social justice, were heading in the social democratic direction more decisively and they soon gave rise to the Polish revisionism movement.

In February 1956, Khrushchev denounced Stalin's cult of personality at the 20th Congress of the Communist Party of the Soviet Union and embarked on a reform course. The de-Stalinization of official Soviet ideology left Poland's Stalinist hardliners in a difficult position. While unrest and desire for reform and change among both intellectuals and workers were beginning to surface throughout the Eastern Bloc, the death of Stalin's ally Bierut in March 1956 in Moscow (he was attending the Soviet party's congress) exacerbated an existing split in the Polish party. In March Bierut was succeeded by Edward Ochab as first secretary. As the 20th Congress inspired also partial democratisation of Polish political and economic life, Ochab engaged in reforms intended to promote industrial decentralization and improve living standards.

The number of security agents was cut by 22%. By a widespread amnesty, 35,000 detainees across the entire country were released. 9,000 imprisoned for political reasons were freed in all. Hardline Stalinists, such as Jakub Berman, Roman Romkowski and Anatol Fejgin were removed from power, some arrested. Berman, dismissed in May, by Gomułka's decision was never prosecuted. A few perpetrators of Stalinist crimes were prosecuted and sentenced to prison terms. A much broader plan to charge the responsible and verify all of the security apparatus was formally presented by the prosecutors, but the action was not approved by Gomułka, who counted among the Stalinist persecution victims, as did his wife. Gomułka conducted some purges and reforms but did not want to destabilize the security system, now under his control, by wide-ranging formal prosecutions.

== Gomułka's road to socialism (1956–1970) ==
=== Polish October ===
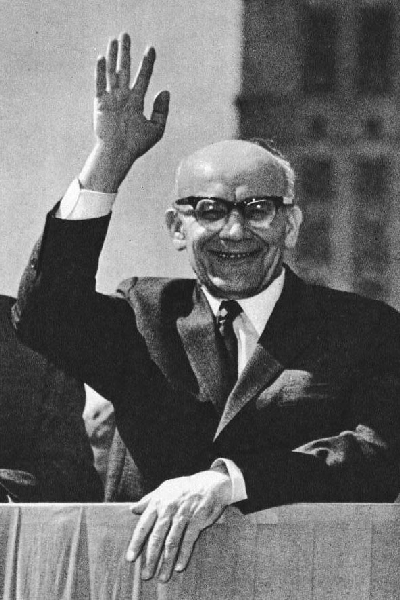
Władysław Gomułka

Beginning on 28 June 1956, workers in the industrial city of Poznań, who had repeatedly but in vain petitioned the authorities to intervene and improve their deteriorating situation, went on strike and rioted in response to a cut in wages and changed working conditions. Demonstrations by factory workers turned into a huge citywide protest. 16 tanks, 2 armoured personnel carriers and 30 vehicles were brought to bear by a local military commander. Some of them were seized by the protesters, who also broke into the local government buildings. 57 people were killed and several hundred injured in two days of fighting. Several major military formations entered the scene, but the army's role was mainly that of support of the police and security forces action.^{[a]} At the Poznań radio station, Prime Minister Cyrankiewicz warned and threatened the rioters in his widely publicized speech: he "...who will dare raise his hand against the people's rule may be sure that... the authorities will chop off his hand". Of the 746 people officially detained during and in the aftermath of the disturbances, almost 80% were workers. The authorities launched an investigation, attempting to uncover a claimed premeditated instigation and involvement by Western or anticommunist underground centers. Such efforts were unsuccessful and the events were found to have been spontaneous and locally supported. The Poznań revolt's lasting impact was that it caused a deeper and more liberal realignment within the Polish communist party and in its relationship to Moscow.

Deeply shaken by the protests and violence, the 7th Plenum of the Central Committee, held in July 1956, split into two groups, the "hardliners" Natolin and the "reformist" Puławy factions, named after the locations where they held their meetings. The Natolin faction consisted largely of communist officials from the army and state security, including Franciszek Jóźwiak, Mieczysław Moczar, Zenon Kliszko and Zenon Nowak, who advocated the removal of "Stalin's Jewish protégés", but were themselves of Stalinist sympathies. Many in the Puławy faction were former Stalinist fanatics and past enemies of Gomułka's. Now become liberal reformers and supporters of Gomułka's return to power. In response to the recent disturbances, the regime turned to conciliation: wage rises and other reforms for the Poznań workers were announced. In the party and among the intellectuals, demands for wider reforms of the Stalinist system were becoming more widespread and intense.

Realizing the need for new leadership, in what became known as the Polish October, the Politburo chose Gomułka, who had been released from prison and reinstated in the party, and the Central Committee's 8th Plenum elected him without a Soviet approval the new first secretary of the PZPR. Subsequently, Gomułka convinced the Soviet leaders that he would preserve the Soviet influence in Poland. Gomułka's elevation was preceded by ominous Soviet military moves and an arrival of Soviet high-level delegation led by Khrushchev, which flew into Warsaw to witness and influence the upheaval in the Polish party. After the sometimes confrontational encounters and negotiations, they soon returned to Moscow, where the Soviet leader announced on 21 October that the idea of an armed intervention in Poland should be abandoned. This position was reinforced by pressure from communist China, which demanded that the Soviets leave the new Polish leadership alone. On 21 October in Warsaw Gomułka's return to power was accomplished, giving rise to the era of national communism in Poland. Gomułka pledged to dismantle Stalinism and in his acceptance speech raised numerous social democratic-sounding reformist ideas, giving hope to the left-wing revisionists and others in Polish society that the communist state was, after all, reformable. The revisionists aspired to represent the worker movement, recently defeated in Poznań. Their main goals were political freedom and self-management in state enterprises. However, the end of Soviet influence in Eastern Europe was nowhere in sight. On 14 May 1955, the Warsaw Pact was signed in the Polish capital, to counteract the earlier establishment of NATO.

Many Soviet officers serving in the Polish Armed Forces were dismissed, but very few Stalinist officials were put on trial for the repressions of the Bierut period. The Puławy faction argued that mass trials of Stalinist officials, many of them Jewish, would incite animosity toward the Jews. Konstantin Rokossovsky and other Soviet advisers were sent home, and the Polish communist establishment and system took on a more independent orientation. Gomułka, conscious of geopolitical realities, agreed that Soviet troops would remain in Poland and no overt anti-Soviet outbursts would be allowed. However, he formalized the Polish-Soviet relations and the unprecedented for a Soviet-allied state military cooperation treaty, signed in December 1956, stated that the stationing of the Soviet forces in Poland "can in no way violate the sovereignty of the Polish state and cannot lead to their interference in internal matters of the Polish People's Republic". Poland thus avoided the risk of Soviet armed intervention of the kind that crushed the Hungarian Revolution of 1956. On his part, Gomułka rewarded the Soviets for his internal leeway with loyal support for the duration of his career. In one act of defiance, the Polish delegation at the United Nations abstained in November 1956 from the vote condemning the Soviet intervention in Hungary.

There were repeated attempts by some Polish academics and philosophers, many related to the prewar Lwów–Warsaw school – such as Leszek Kołakowski, Stanisław Ossowski and Adam Schaff – to create a bridge between Poland's history and Marxist ideology and develop a specific form of Polish Marxism. Such efforts were stifled due to the regime's unwillingness to risk the wrath of the Soviet Union for deviating too far from the Soviet party line. Kołakowski, a leading revisionist, was verbally attacked by Gomułka in 1957, expelled from the party in 1966 and had to emigrate in 1968. Among other noted revisionists were Włodzimierz Brus, Bronisław Baczko, Zygmunt Bauman, and Krzysztof Pomian. The PZPR establishment saw them as true supporters of capitalist social democracy, pretending to be socialists.

=== Scaling back of campaign promises ===
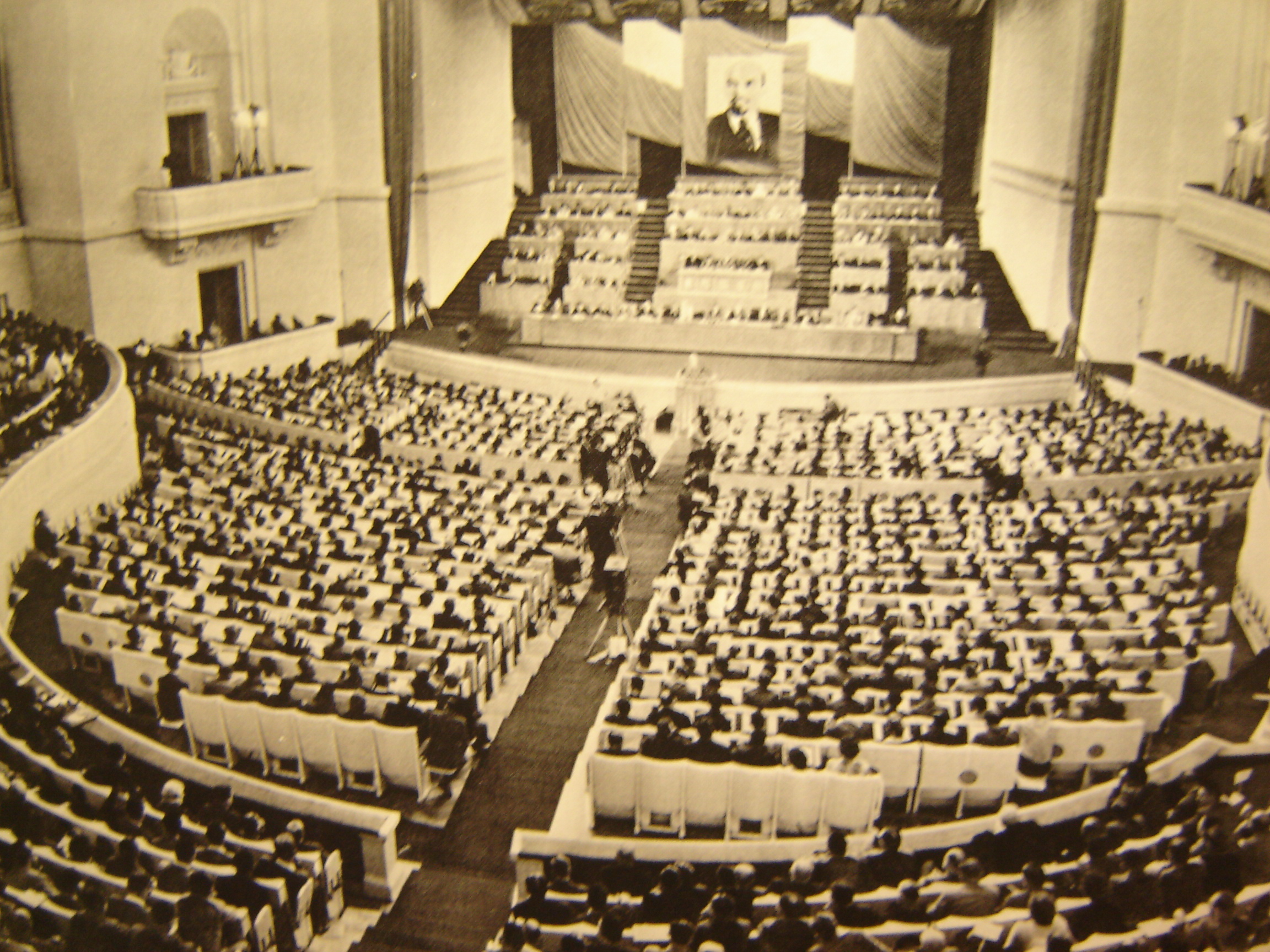
The Fourth Congress of the Polish United Workers' Party, held in 1963

Poland welcomed Gomułka's rise to power with relief. Gomułka promised an end to police terror, greater intellectual and religious freedom, higher wages, and the reversal of collectivization; and to some degree he fulfilled these promises. Production of consumer goods was somewhat increased. The party elite as well as academic and literary intelligentsia experienced greater freedom and significant gains, felt as "a certain diversity and revitalization of elite public life". The dissident discussion group Club of the Crooked Circle survived until 1962. Other forms of collective community expression and a legally guaranteed academic autonomy (based on the 1958 statute of higher learning) lasted until the 1968 Polish political crisis. The permitted academic discourse was in marked contrast to the treatment afforded workers, whose self-management councils that had spontaneously formed in 1956 were neutralized and brought under control of the party by 1958. In the communist era, because of their class role in the official ideology and leadership's sensibilities, workers enjoyed some clout and a degree of protection of their economic interests, on the condition that they refrained from engaging in independent politics or publicly exerting pressure.

Economic reform was attempted when the Sejm created the Economic Council in 1957. The council included the prominent economists Oskar R. Lange, Czesław Bobrowski, Michał Kalecki, and Edward Lipiński. They proposed a market reform, beginning with the granting of greater self-rule and more independent decision-making capability to enterprises, to facilitate their "realization of plan goals". But the recommended economic improvements, despite the self-restraint of the authors, were not compatible with the obligatory at that time heavy-handed centralized economic command system, and the reform effort fizzled out.

In October 1957, Poland's Foreign Minister Adam Rapacki proposed a European nuclear-free zone that would include the territories of Poland, West Germany, East Germany and Czechoslovakia. In August 1961, the new Berlin Wall cemented the division of Europe.

During 1948–71, the Polish government signed indemnification agreements with a number of West European countries (excluding those considered allies of Nazi Germany), Canada and the United States. The agreements dealt with compensation for the losses incurred by citizens and firms of the countries involved as a result of war events and the subsequent nationalization. The agreement with the U.S. followed the visit to Poland of Vice President Richard Nixon in August 1959 and his talks with Gomułka. It was signed in 1960 and the agreed amount had been paid by the Polish government in twenty installments. The U.S. government thereby assumed responsibility for indemnities resulting from claims filed by U.S. citizens.

After the first wave of reform, Gomułka's regime started to move back on their promises. Control over mass media and universities was gradually tightened, and many of the younger and more reformist members of the party were forced out (over 200,000 purged already in 1958, when the PZPR undertook a "verification" of its membership). The reform-promising Gomułka of 1956 turned into the authoritarian Gomułka of the 1960s. Although Poland enjoyed a period of relative stability in that decade, the idealism of the "Polish October" faded away. The decisions made at the XIII Plenum of the Central Committee, held in 1963, meant a definite end of the post-October liberalization period. The demise of Gomułka's tactical allies, the Puławy faction, gradually replaced by Gomułka's own people, was apparent when Roman Zambrowski, the leading Jewish politician, was removed from the Politburo.

Poland under Gomułka's rule was generally considered one of the more liberal communist states. However, Poles could still go to prison for writing political satire about the party leader, as Janusz Szpotański did, or for publishing a book abroad. A March 1964 "Letter of the 34", signed by leading intellectuals and delivered to the office of Prime Minister Cyrankiewicz, criticized the worsening censorship and demanded a more open cultural policy, as guaranteed by the constitution. Jacek Kuroń and Karol Modzelewski were expelled from the party and from 1965 imprisoned for written criticism (an "Open Letter to the Party") of the party rule and pointing out the contradictory nature of the supposedly workers' state. Kuroń and Modzelewski accused the regime of betraying the revolutionary cause; like many younger Polish reformers, they spoke from leftist positions and were ideologically closely aligned with Western radicals of the 1960s.

As the regime was getting less liberal and more repressive, Gomułka's popularity declined as his initial vision lost its impetus. Many Poles found Gomułka's self-righteous attitude irritating and his demeanor provincial. He reacted to increasing criticism by refusing to budge and insulating himself with the help of cronies, of whom Zenon Kliszko was the most influential. Within the party, Minister of the Interior Mieczysław Moczar and his nationalist-communist faction known as "the Partisans" (together with Moczarowcy, the much broader system of Moczar's political clientele) were looking for an opportunity to assert their dominance.

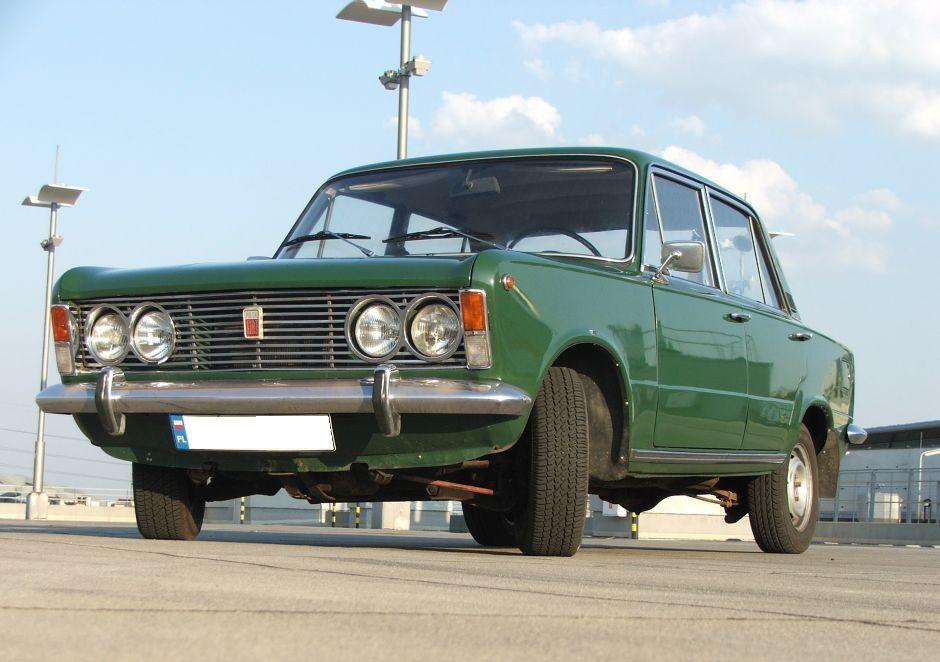
The Polski Fiat 125p, produced in Poland from the late 1960s, was based on technology purchased from Fiat

By the mid-1960s, Poland was starting to experience economic difficulties and the appreciable thus far standard of living improvements were showing signs of stagnation (during 1960–70 real wages for workers grew only by an average of 1.8% per year). The postwar economic boom was ending and the increasingly globalized and integrated world economy was becoming inhospitable to national developments operating behind trade barriers. Like the other communist states, Poland was spending too much on heavy industry, armaments and prestige projects and too little on consumer production. The failure of Soviet-style collectivization returned the collectivized land to the peasants, but most of their farms were too small to be prosperous and productivity in agriculture remained low. Economic relations with West Germany were frozen due to East German interference and resistance to economic integration. Gomułka attributed the signs of economic decline to faulty implementation of the fundamentally correct directions issued by central organs of the party. He failed to appreciate the corrective role of the market, whose feedback could not be replaced by theoretical computations, planning and administrative decisions. On the other hand, pursuing conservative investment rather than consumption oriented economic policies, his government generated no foreign debt.

From 1960, the regime increasingly implemented anti-Catholic policies, including harassment, atheistic propaganda, and measures that made carrying out religious practices more difficult. Gomułka, according to Andrzej Leder, was the last Polish politician who seriously tried to realize an anti-clerical program, a staple leftist undertaking. In 1965, the Conference of Polish Bishops issued the Letter of Reconciliation of the Polish Bishops to the German Bishops. In 1966, the celebrations of the 1,000th anniversary of the Christianization of Poland led by the primate, Cardinal Stefan Wyszyński and other bishops who toured the country, turned into a huge demonstration of the power and popularity of the Catholic Church in Poland. In fierce competition, the state authorities conducted their own national celebrations, stressing the origin of Polish statehood, but the display of the Church hierarchy's command of enormous crowds in a land ruled by the communists must have impressed the Catholic prelates in the Vatican and elsewhere. The state-church dialogue, symbolized by the presence of the few Znak independent Catholic deputies in parliament, was rapidly deteriorating.

=== 1968 events ===
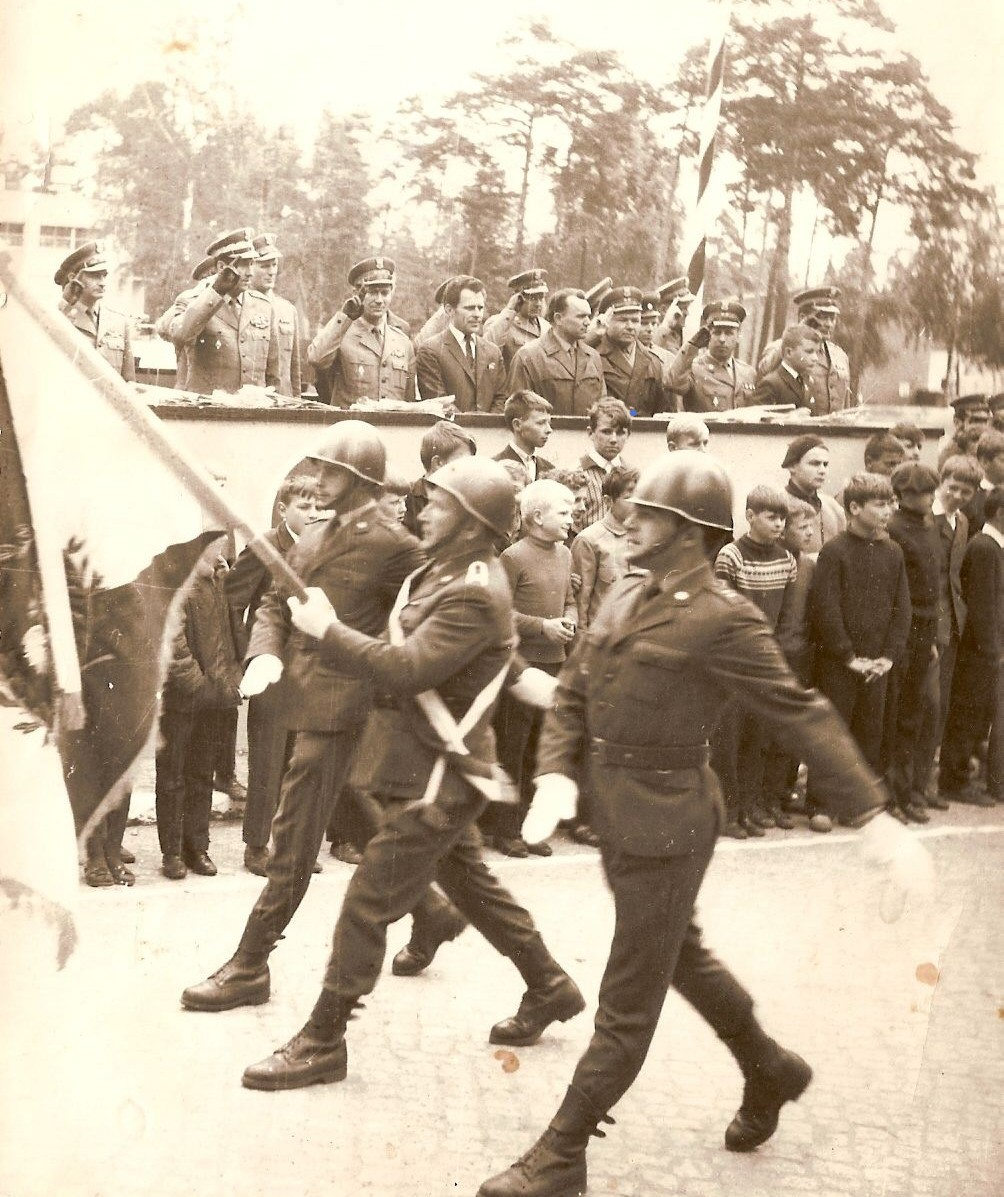
Standard-bearers of the 27 Tank Regiment, mid-1960s

By the 1960s, rival regime officials and their followers, generally from the younger generation of party activists, had begun to plot against the rule of Gomułka and his associates. Poland's security chief Mieczysław Moczar, a wartime communist partisan commander, based his appeal on nationalistic rhetoric combined with anti-intelligentsia and anti-Jewish sentiments and became the chief challenger. The party leader in Upper Silesia, Edward Gierek, who had become involved with the communist movement as a teenage mining industry laborer in France, also emerged as a possible alternative leader. Gierek was favored by the more pragmatic and technocratic members of the nomenklatura. From January 1968, Polish revisionist opposition and other circles were strongly influenced by the developing movement of the Prague Spring.

In March 1968, student demonstrations at the University of Warsaw broke out in the wake of the government's ban on further performance of the play Dziady by Adam Mickiewicz (written in 1824) at the National Theatre in Warsaw, because of its alleged "anti-Soviet references". Subsequently, the ORMO and other security formations attacked protesting university students in several major cities.^{[u]}

In what became known as the March 1968 events, Moczar used the prior spontaneous and informal celebrations of the outcome of the Arab–Israeli Six-Day War of 1967 and now the Warsaw theatre affair as pretexts to launch an anti-intellectual and anti-Semitic (officially designated as "anti-Zionist") press campaign, whose real goal was to weaken the pro-reform liberal party faction and attack other circles. Thousands of generally secular and integrated people of Jewish origin lost their employment and some 15,000 Jews emigrated between 1967 and 1971. Of what used to be the prewar Europe's largest Jewish community, only several thousand people remained in Poland.

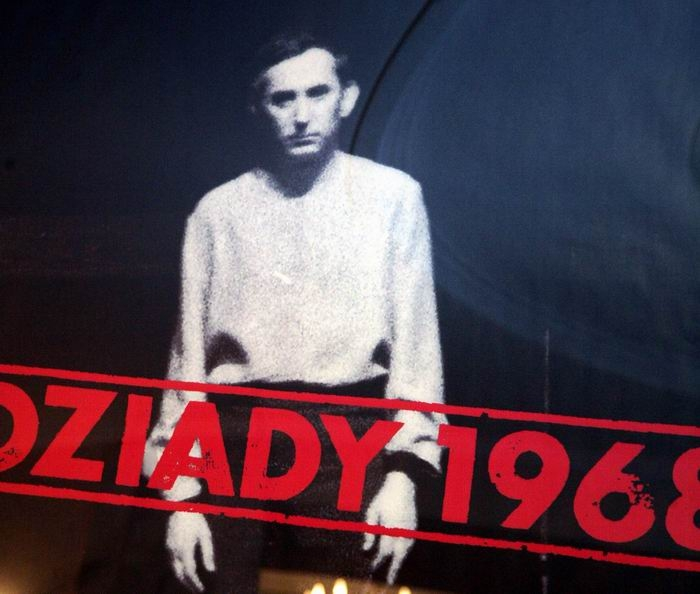
Dziady, a theatrical event that spawned nationwide protests

Other victims were college students, many of whom were expelled from their institutions and had their careers destroyed, academic teachers who tried to defend the students and the academic institutions themselves: Warsaw University had several departments administratively dissolved.^{[k]} Liberal intelligentsia members, Jewish or not, were removed from the government and other places of employment. Leftist intellectuals and student leaders lost what was left of their faith in the ostensibly socialist government. Finally the party itself was purged of many thousand suspect members, people who somehow did not fit the new environment of intolerance and hatred. The 1968 purges meant also the beginning of a large scale generational replacement of the party executive membership, a process that continued into the early 1970s, after Gomułka's departure. The prewar communist cadres were removed and people whose careers were formed in People's Poland took their place, which gave Gomułka's successor Edward Gierek one of the youngest in Europe elites of power early in his term.

The revisionist dissident prominence in the 1968 events overshadowed the equally significant awakening taking place among the working class of Poland. Gdańsk, where thousands of students and workers fought the police on March 15, had the highest in the country rate of administrative detentions and court cases. The greatest proportion of people arrested and imprisoned in March and April 1968 in Poland were classified by the authorities as "workers".

An internal attempt was made to discredit Gomułka's leadership, but there were aspects of the ongoing witch hunt which he found to be to his advantage and tolerated. In the meantime, irreversible damage to society had been wrecked by the Moczar movement. Gomułka's regime reasserted itself and was saved by a combination of international and domestic factors, including the Moczar faction's inability to take over the party and state apparatus. The Soviet Union, now led by Leonid Brezhnev, was preoccupied with the crisis in Czechoslovakia and not inclined to support personnel changes in the Polish leadership.

In August 1968, the Polish People's Army took part in the Warsaw Pact invasion of Czechoslovakia. Some Polish intellectuals protested, and Ryszard Siwiec burned himself alive during celebrations of an official holiday. The Polish participation in the crushing of the Czech liberalization movement (the crowning achievement of Marxist revisionism, according to David Ost) further alienated Gomułka from his former liberal supporters. But within the party, the opposition to Gomułka faded and the 5th Congress of the PZPR reconfirmed his rule in November. Brezhnev, who attended the gathering, used the occasion to expound his Brezhnev Doctrine, a self-granted Soviet right to forcefully intervene if an allied state strays too far from the "fraternal course".

=== Treaty with West Germany, food riots and the ousting of Gomułka ===
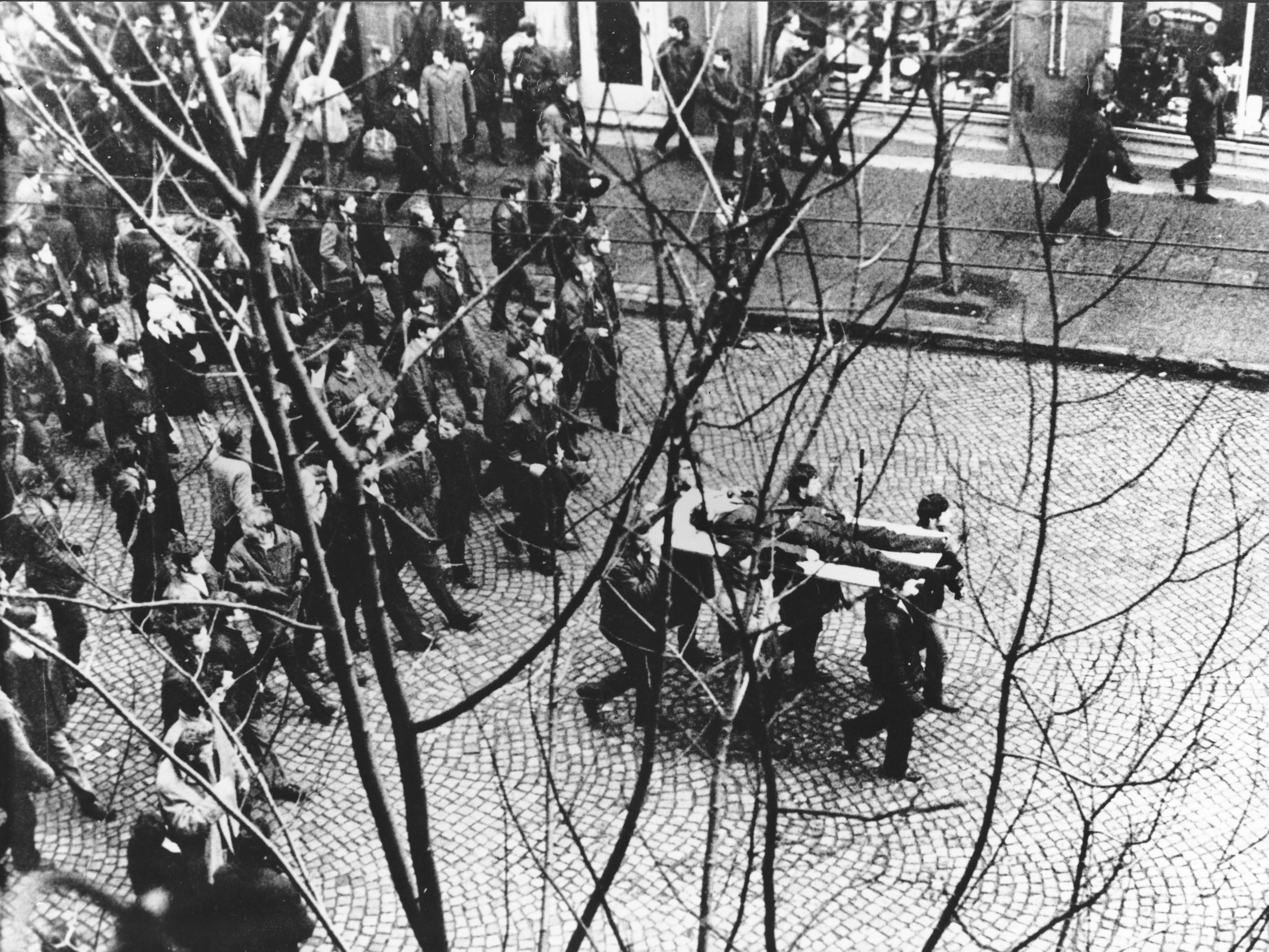
Demonstrators in Gdynia carry the body of Zbigniew Godlewski, who was shot and killed during the protests of 1970

In December 1970, Gomułka's government scored a major political success when Poland obtained recognition by West Germany of post-World War II borders. In the negotiations leading to the Treaty of Warsaw, the German side secured the right to emigrate to West Germany for residents of Poland of German identity and the ability to help financially those who stayed in Poland by granting pensions. Hundreds of thousands eventually became affected. German Chancellor Willy Brandt, who signed the agreement, used the occasion to ask on his knees for forgiveness for the crimes of the Nazis (Kniefall von Warschau). His gesture was understood in Poland as being addressed to all Poles, although it was made at the site of the Warsaw Ghetto and thus directed primarily toward the Jews. The notable reconciliation process between the Polish and German nations was initiated five years earlier, when the Polish Church leaders issued the Letter of Reconciliation of the Polish Bishops to the German Bishops, criticized then by the Polish government.

Gomułka felt proud and secure after the treaty with West Germany, his milestone political achievement. It signified a lasting trend in Poland's international policy: extricating the country from the disproportional dependence on Russia and compensating the security vulnerability by building good relations with Germany.

But the event could not mask the economic crisis into which Poland was drifting. Although the system of fixed, artificially low food prices kept urban discontent under control, it caused economic strain. In the long run the situation was unsustainable, and on 12 December 1970 the regime unexpectedly announced substantial increases in the prices of basic foodstuffs.

On 14–19 December 1970, mass demonstrations against the price rises broke out in the northern (Baltic coast) cities of Gdańsk, Gdynia, Elbląg and Szczecin. In violent confrontations at those and other locations 19 public buildings were destroyed or damaged, including headquarters of the party in Gdańsk and Szczecin. The PZPR Central Committee was deliberating in Warsaw, but a smaller conference, led by Gomułka, issued an authorization for a limited use of lethal force to defend lives and property. Gomułka, however, was determined to impose a forceful resolution of the conflict. Among the party leaders who arrived on the coast and directed the local enforcement actions, initially in Gdańsk, were Zenon Kliszko and Stanisław Kociołek. In Gdynia, soldiers were instructed to prevent protesters from returning to factory buildings; they fired into a crowd of workers emerging from commuter trains. Fatal confrontations took place also in Szczecin. Possibly about fifty people were killed in the coastal region in December.

The protest movement spread to other cities, leading to more strikes and causing angry workers to occupy many factories. The general strike across Poland was scheduled for 21 December 1970.

The party leadership meeting in Warsaw on 20 December recognized the danger that the working class revolt presented to their system. In consultations with the disturbed Soviet leaders, they proceeded with arranging the resignation of Gomułka, who was by then stressed out and ill. Several of his collaborators were also removed. Edward Gierek was drafted as the new first secretary. Mieczysław Moczar, another strong contender, was not trusted and even blamed for the current debacle by the Soviets.

Another strike in Szczecin broke out on 22 January 1971. Gierek gambled that his personal appearances would resolve the crisis. He went to Szczecin on 24 January and to Gdańsk the next day, met the workers, apologized for the past mistakes and assured them that as a former worker himself he understood their plight and would now govern Poland for the people. Participants of the Szczecin strike demanded freely elected worker councils and union representatives. Gierek consented, but in reality the authorities soon marginalized and eliminated the worker leaders from the legally existing labor structures and their places of employment. The February 1971 Łódź strikes followed and concentrated on economic demands. Afterwards prices were lowered, wage increases announced, and sweeping economic and political changes promised.

The Polish opposition movement, traditionally led by the intelligentsia, after the two heavy blows of 1968 and 1970 was in disarray and silent. The revisionists' tenuous connection with the communist party was permanently broken, but a new strategy had not yet emerged. However, already in 1971 Leszek Kołakowski published in the émigré Kultura journal a seminal article entitled Theses on Hope and Hopelessness. It put forward a concept of civil democratizing resistance movement that would be valid even in the repressed and seemingly deadlocked state socialist society.

== Gierek decade (1970–1980) ==
=== Catching up with the West ===
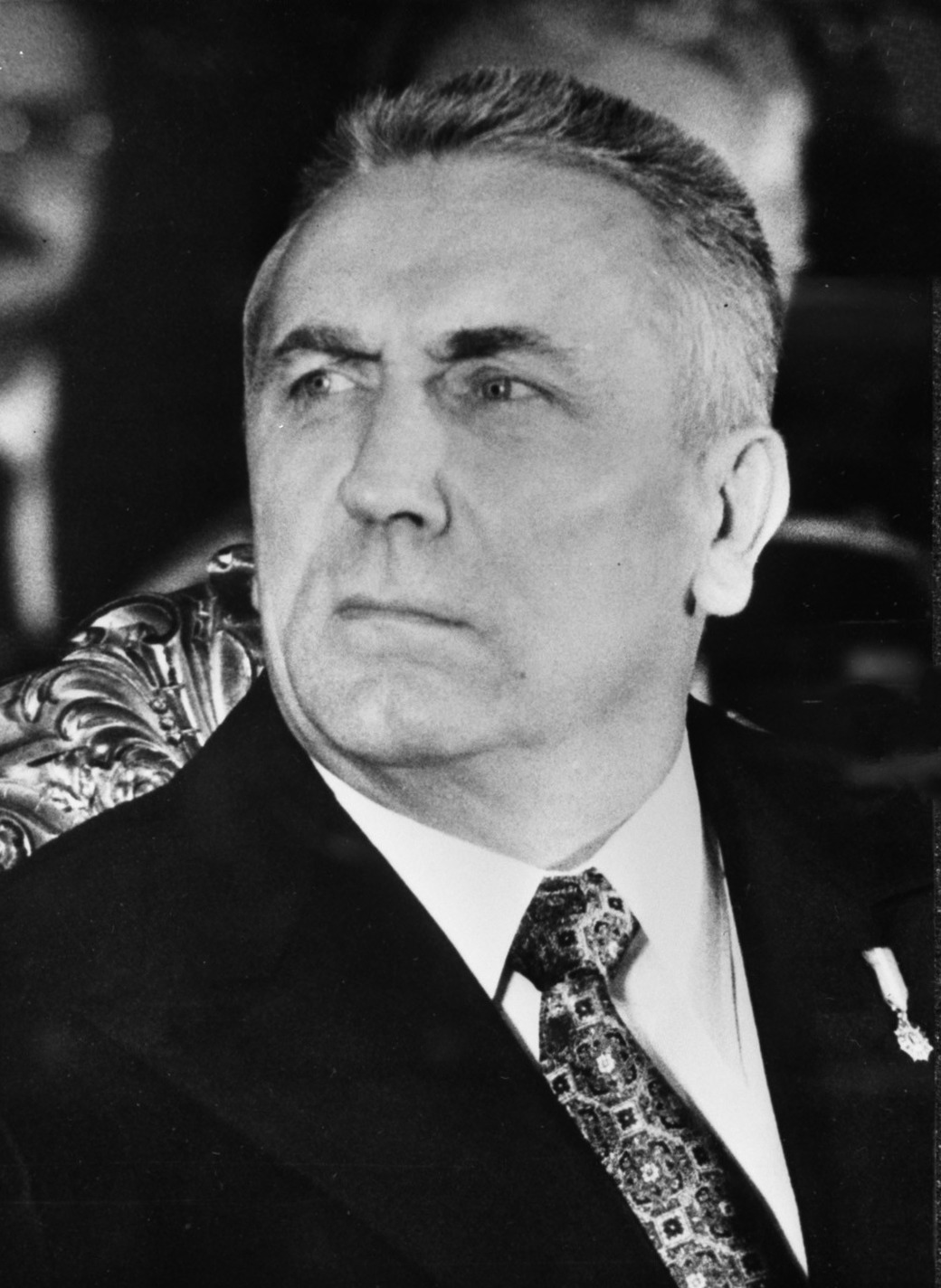
Edward Gierek

Gierek, like Gomułka in 1956, came to power on a raft of promises that everything would be different from now on: wages would rise, prices would remain stable, there would be freedom of speech, and those responsible for the violence at Gdynia and elsewhere would be punished. Gierek was believed to be an honest and well-intentioned man, and his promises bought him some time. He proceeded to create a new economic program, based on large-scale borrowing from banks in the West, to buy technology that would upgrade Poland's production of export goods. This massive borrowing, estimated to have totaled over 24 billion US (1970s) dollars during Gierek years, was intended to be used for equipment and modernization of Polish industry, and for import of consumer goods to give the workers more incentive to work.

For the next few years, the regime optimistically engaged in reform and experimentation and for the first time many Poles could afford to buy cars, televisions and other luxury items. Attention was paid to the wages workers received. The peasants had their compulsory deliveries abolished, were paid higher prices for their products and free health service was finally extended to rural, self-employed Poland. Censorship was eased and Poles were able to travel to the West and maintain foreign contacts with little difficulty. Relations with the Polish emigrant communities were improved. The relative cultural and political relaxation resulted in a better freedom of speech environment, exercised for example by the respected weekly Polityka. The massive investments and purchases of Western technology were expected to both improve the standard of living of the various segments of society and establish an internationally competitive Polish industry and agriculture. The modernized manufacturing would result in a vastly expanded export of Polish-made products to the West, which in turn would generate hard currency to pay-off the debts.

This "New Development Strategy", based on import-led growth, depended on the global economic conditions and the program faltered suddenly because of worldwide recession and increased oil prices. The effects of the 1973–74 oil crisis produced an inflationary surge followed by a recession in the West, which resulted in a sharp increase in the price of imported consumer goods in Poland, coupled with a decline in demand for Polish exports, particularly coal. Poland's foreign debt, absent at the time of Gomułka's departure, rose rapidly under Gierek to reach a multibillion-dollar figure. Continuing borrowing from the West had become increasingly difficult. Consumer goods began to disappear from Polish shops. The new factories built by Gierek's regime proved to be largely ineffective and mismanaged, as the basics of market demand and cost effectiveness were often ignored. The significant internal economic reform, promised by the Gierek team, had not materialized.

The Western credits thus helped spur industrial growth and helped Gierek's policy of consumerism, but just for a few years. The industrial production grew by an average of 10% per year between 1971 and 1975 (the years remembered later by many older Poles as most prosperous, considering not only the communist period in Poland), only to dwindle to less than 2% in 1979. Debt servicing that took 12% of export earnings in 1971, rose to 75% in 1979.

In 1975, like other European countries, Poland became a signatory of the Helsinki Accords and member of the Organization for Security and Co-operation in Europe (OSCE); such developments were possible because of the period of "détente" between the Soviet Union and the United States. Despite the regime's promises that the freedoms listed in the agreement would be implemented in Poland, there was little change. However, the Poles were becoming more aware of the rights they were being denied and emboldened by the knowledge of their government's treaty obligations.

Gierek government's growing difficulties led also to increased dependence on the Soviet Union, including tight economic cooperation and displays of submissiveness not seen under Gomułka's rule. The constitution, amended in February 1976, formalized the alliance with the Soviet Union and the leading role of the communist party. The language of the proposed changes was softened after protests by intellectuals and the Church, but the regime felt it needed additional authority given the indebtedness to the West and the deepening economic crisis. The divisive issues raised helped to coalesce the emerging circles of active political opposition.

Nevertheless, the regime of Gierek deemphasized the Marxist ideology and from his time the "communist" governments of Poland concentrated on pragmatic issues and current concerns. In Polish economic politics new lasting trends were initiated, such as the emphasis on individual initiative, personal aspirations and competition, which some interpreted as an attack on egalitarianism (social inequalities were indeed increasing). Sections of the intelligentsia, nomenklatura and small business gave rise to the emerging middle class. The new "socialist" ways were less totalitarian, stressed innovation, modern management methods and engaged workers, all seen as necessary to push the outdated economy past the constant crisis stage. Poland of the 1970s became more open to the world and entered the global economy, which permanently changed society, creating at the same time a new type of crisis vulnerability. The opposition thinking, its promotion of society formed by active individuals, developed along complementary concepts.

=== Renewal of social unrest and the rise of organized opposition ===
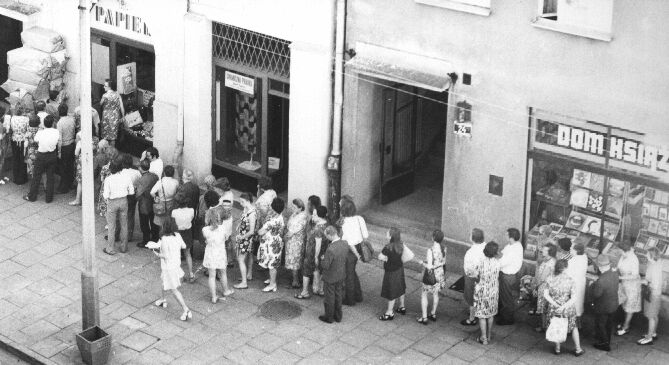
Queue line, a frequent scene at times of shortages of consumer goods in the 1970s and 1980s

As a result of the 1970 worker rebellion food prices remained frozen and were artificially low. The demand for food products exceeded the supply also because of the higher real wages, which already in the first two years of Gierek's government increased more than during the entire decade of the 1960s. In June 1976, in an attempt to reduce consumption, the government introduced a long-announced and several times delayed, but radical price increase: basic foodstuffs had their prices raised by an average of 60%, three times the rate of Gomułka'a increases from six years before. The compensatory wage rises were skewed toward the better-off part of the population.^{[w]} The result was an immediate nationwide wave of strikes, with violent demonstrations, looting and other labor unrest at the Ursus Factory near Warsaw, in Radom, Płock and other places. The government quickly backed down and repealed the price rises, but the strike leaders were arrested and put on trial. A series of "spontaneous" large scale public gatherings, intended to convey the "anger of the people" at the "trouble-makers" was staged by the party leadership in a number of cities, but the Soviet pressure prevented further attempts at raising prices. Gierek's cordial in the past relations with Leonid Brezhnev were now seriously damaged. Food ration cards, introduced because of the destabilized market in August 1976, were to remain a feature of life in Poland for the duration of the People's Republic. The regime's retreat, having occurred for the second time in several years, amounted to an unprecedented defeat. Within the rigid political system, the government was neither able to reform (it would lose control and power) nor to satisfy society's staple needs, because it had to sell abroad all it could to make foreign debt and interests payments. The government was in a quandary, the population suffered from the lack of necessities, and organized opposition found room to expand and consolidate.

Because of the 1976 disturbances and the subsequent arrests, mistreatment and dismissals of worker militants, a group of intellectuals led by Jacek Kuroń, Antoni Macierewicz, Jan Józef Lipski and Adam Michnik founded and operated the Workers' Defence Committee (Komitet Obrony Robotników; KOR). The aim of the KOR was to assist the worker victims of the 1976 repression. Working to support the spontaneous workers' movements, the dissidents recognized the necessarily predominant role of the working class in resisting the abuses of the regime. Accordingly, the newly formed opposition was increasingly characterized by an alliance of intelligentsia with workers. The KOR, according to Modzelewski, constituted the core of organized opposition and a seed of political alternative; clearing the way for other opposition formations, it engendered political pluralism. More opposition groups indeed soon followed, including the Movement for Defense of Human and Civic Rights (ROPCiO), Free Trade Unions of the Coast (WZZW) and the Confederation of Independent Poland (KPN). The periodical Robotnik ('The Worker') was distributed in factories from September 1977. The idea of independent trade unions was first raised by the Gdańsk and Szczecin workers striking in 1970–71. Now it was developed and promoted by the KOR and its leftist collaborators, which led to the establishment in 1978 of Free Trade Unions, the precursor of Solidarity. The KPN represented the minority right-wing of the Polish opposition scene at that time. The opposition members tried to resist the regime by denouncing it for violating the Constitution of the Polish People's Republic, Polish laws and Poland's international obligations. They fit within the post-Helsinki Soviet Bloc human rights movements and for the most part had not yet developed more radical, anti-system orientations.^{[x]}

For the rest of the 1970s, resistance to the regime grew, assuming also the forms of student groups, clandestine newspapers and publishers, importing books and newspapers, and even a "Flying University". The regime practiced various forms of repression against the budding reform movements.

=== Polish Pope John Paul II ===
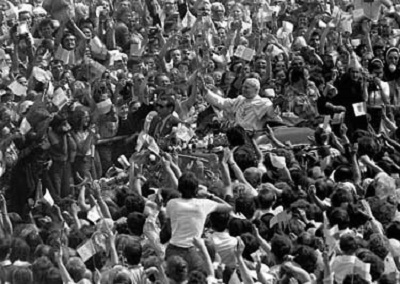
Millions cheer Pope John Paul II in his first visit to Poland as pontiff in 1979

On 16 October 1978, Poland experienced what many Poles literally believed to be a miracle. Cardinal Karol Wojtyła, the archbishop of Kraków, was elected pope at the Vatican, taking the name John Paul II. The election of a Polish pope had an electrifying effect on what was at that time one of the last idiosyncratically Catholic countries in Europe. When John Paul toured Poland in June 1979, half a million people came to welcome him in Warsaw; in the next eight days, about ten million Poles attended the many outdoor masses he celebrated. John Paul clearly became the most important person in Poland, leaving the regime not so much opposed as ignored. Rather than calling for rebellion, John Paul encouraged the creation of an "alternative Poland" of social institutions independent of the government, so that when the next crisis came, the nation would present a united front.

=== Polish emigration ===
The Polish government-in-exile in London, unrecognized since the end of World War II, was of great symbolic importance to many Poles. Under President Edward Bernard Raczyński it overcame years of internal squabbles, and after the election of the Polish pope, at the time of the increasingly assertive Polish opposition, improved its image and standing.

The large Polish emigrant communities in North America, Western Europe and elsewhere were politically active and lent significant support to those struggling in the country. The staunchly anti-communist American Polonia and other Poles felt grateful for the leadership of President Ronald Reagan. Of the Polish institutions in the West the most important were the Radio Free Europe, whose Polish section was run by Jan Nowak-Jeziorański, and the monthly literary Kultura magazine in Paris, led by Jerzy Giedroyc and Juliusz Mieroszewski.

== Final decade of the Polish People's Republic (1980–1989) ==
=== Failing economy and labor unrest ===
By 1980, the authorities had no choice but to make another attempt to raise consumer prices to realistic levels, but they knew that doing so would likely spark another worker rebellion. Western financial companies and institutions providing loans to the regime at a meeting at the Bank Handlowy in Warsaw on 24 April 1980 The bankers made it clear that the state could no longer subsidize artificially low prices of consumer goods. The government gave in after two months and, on 1 July, announced a system of gradual but continuous price rises, particularly for meat. A wave of strikes and factory occupations began at once, with the biggest ones taking place in Lublin in July.

Polish Crisis of 1980–1981
- Part of the Cold War
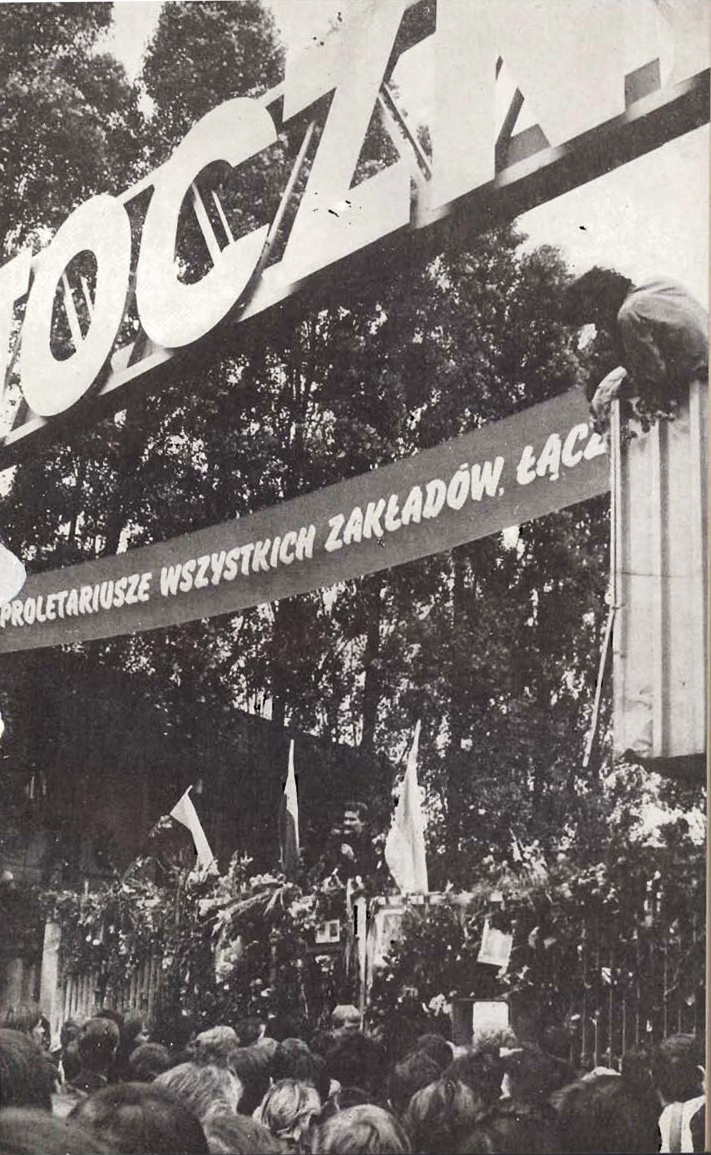
- Lech Wałęsa speaks during the strike at the Gdańsk Shipyard, August 1980
- Date: 1 July 1980 – 13 December 1981 (1 year, 5 months, 4 weeks and 2 days)
- Location: Poland
- Participants: Solidarity Catholic Church Polish United Workers' Party
- Outcome: Martial Law in Poland: Continued underground resistance

The strikes reached the politically sensitive Baltic Sea coast, with a sit-down strike at the Lenin Shipyard in Gdańsk beginning on 14 August. Among the leaders of the strike were Anna Walentynowicz and Lech Wałęsa, a long-fired shipyard electrician who headed the strike committee. A list of 21 demands was formulated by the Inter-Enterprise Strike Committee on 17 August. The strike wave spread along the coast, closing the ports and bringing the economy to a halt. With the assistance of activists from the KOR and support of many other intellectuals (an Expert Commission was established to aid with the negotiations), the workers occupying the various factories, mines and shipyards across Poland organized as a united front. They were not limiting their efforts to seeking economic improvements, but made and stuck to the crucial demand, an establishment of trade unions independent of government control. Among other issues raised were rights for the Church, the freeing of political prisoners and an improved health service.

The party leadership was faced with a choice between repressions on a massive scale and an amicable agreement that would give the workers what they wanted and thus quieten the aroused population. They chose the latter. On 31 August Wałęsa signed the Gdańsk Agreement with Mieczysław Jagielski, a member of the party Politburo. The agreement acknowledged the right of employees to associate in free trade unions, obliged the government to take steps to eliminate censorship, abolished weekend work, increased the minimum wage, improved and extended welfare and pensions and increased autonomy of industrial enterprises, where a meaningful role was to be played by workers' self-management councils. The rule of the party was significantly weakened (to a "leading role in the state", not society) but nonetheless explicitly recognized, together with Poland's international alliances. It was seen by the more moderate forces, including leading intelligentsia advisers and the Catholic hierarchy, as necessary to prevent a Soviet intervention. The opposition negotiators did not concern themselves with the issue of affordability of the economic concessions they obtained and a wave of national euphoria swept the country. In addition to the Gdańsk Agreement, similar documents were signed at other centers of strike activity: in Szczecin (the Szczecin Agreement), Jastrzębie-Zdrój, and at Katowice Steelworks.

=== Solidarity ===
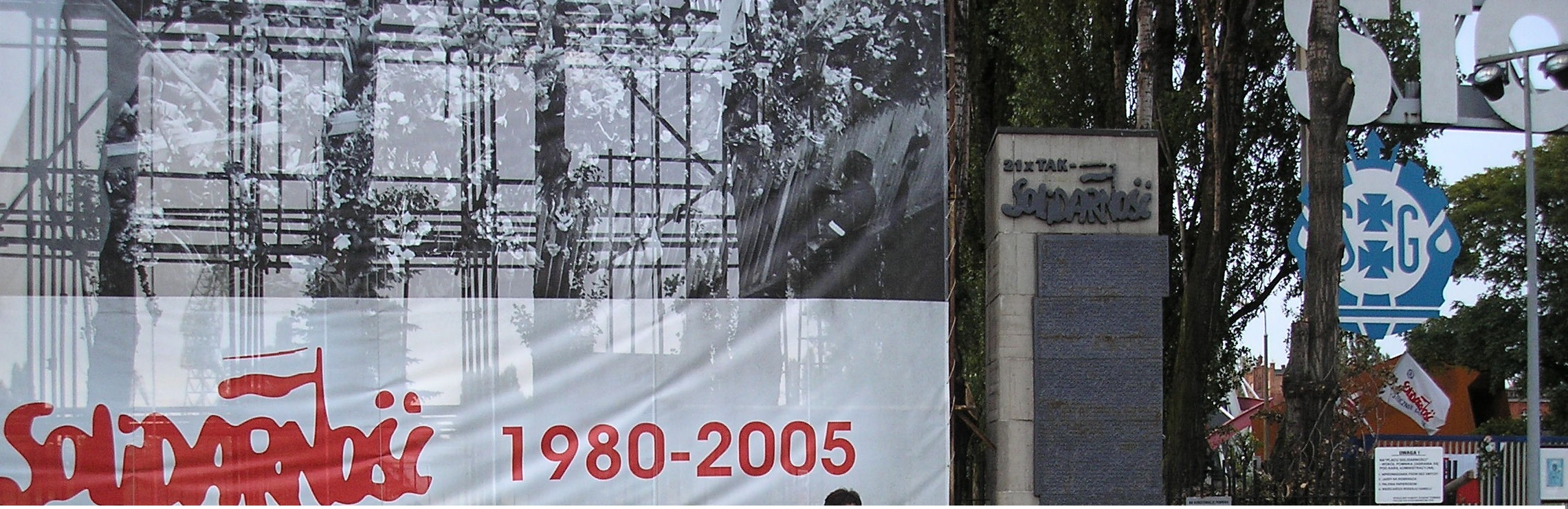
25th anniversary of Solidarity, summer 2005 in Gdańsk

The Gdańsk Agreement, an aftermath of the August 1980 strike, was an important milestone. It led to a national gathering of independent union representatives (Interfactory Organizing Committees, MKZ) on 17 September in Gdańsk and the formation of the trade union "Solidarity" (Polish Solidarność), founded on that day and led by Lech Wałęsa.^{[j]} The ideas of the independent union movement spread rapidly throughout Poland; Solidarity structures were formed in most places of employment and in all regions. Having been able to overcome the regime's efforts to thwart or derail its activities and status, Solidarity was finally registered in court as a national labor union in November. Early in 1981, a network of union organizations at the enterprise-level was established; it included the country's main industrial complexes, such as the Lenin Steelworks in Kraków and the Silesian mines.

Initially, in the KOR's tradition, Solidarity was an ostensibly non-political movement aiming at reconstruction of civil society. Suddenly thrust into legal existence and prominence in 1980, Solidarity and the Polish opposition in general lacked a constructive program or consensus regarding further developments. In 1981, Solidarity accepted the necessity of assuming a political role and helped form a broad anti-ruling system social movement, dominated by the working class and with members ranging from people associated with the Catholic Church to non-communist leftists. The union was backed by intellectual dissidents, including the KOR, and adhered to a policy of nonviolent resistance. According to Karol Modzelewski, the Solidarity of 1980–81 was permeated by the idea of brotherhood between intelligentsia and workers. In the areas of ideology and politics, Solidarity followed the lead of its associated opposition intellectuals.^{[p]}

The activity of Solidarity, although concerned with trade union matters (such as replacing the nomenklatura-run system with worker self-management in enterprise-level decision making),^{[h]} was widely regarded as the first step towards dismantling the regime's dominance over social institutions, professional organizations and community associations. Because of conditions specific to state socialist society, Solidarity soon lost its labor focus and became a universalist movement that emphasized civic rights and open society. Removing the ruling formation or breaking the dependence on the Soviet Union was not on the agenda. Using strikes and other tactics, the union sought to block government policies. The aims of the original, so-called First Solidarity (1980–81), were to reform socialism, not to introduce industrial private ownership or promote capitalism in general. Solidarity was an egalitarian and collectivist movement. It did not postulate any re-privatization of property taken over by the state after World War II or of rural possessions generated by the land reform, as such concepts were beyond the axiological horizon of Polish society. Solidarity was socialist and social justice was its goal. The First Solidarity upheaval could be viewed also as working people revolting against the emerging capitalist features of the economic order that diminished their role in Gierek-led society, combined with the "anti-politics" approach (building civil society "without reference to both state and market") embraced at that time by their allied intellectual leaders. People of decidedly anticommunist or anti-PZPR orientations constituted a relatively small minority within the First Solidarity organization, which accommodated one million communist party members among its ranks. Apart from workers, both individual farmers and students created their own independent organizations: Rural Solidarity and Independent Students' Union. They were formally recognized by the authorities only after strike actions conducted by activists of both movements in January 1981.

In September 1980, in the aftermath of the labor agreements, First Secretary Gierek was removed from office and replaced as party leader by Stanisław Kania. Like his predecessors, Kania made promises that the regime could not fulfill because the authorities were still trapped by the contradiction: if they followed economic necessity, they would generate political instability. The gross national income fell in 1979 by 2%, in 1980 by 8%, and in 1981 by 15–20%.

At the communist summit in December 1980 in Moscow, Kania argued with Leonid Brezhnev and other Warsaw Pact leaders, who pressed for an immediate military intervention in Poland. Kania and Minister of Defense Wojciech Jaruzelski declared their determination to fight the "counterrevolution" in Poland on their own. In regard to Solidarity, as they saw it, there was still a chance for its healthy, working class current to prevail, not the KOR-instigated anti-socialist, troublemaking elements. President Jimmy Carter and President-elect Ronald Reagan made urgent phone calls to Brezhnev and the intervention was postponed. In the meantime Solidarity, not quite aware of the looming danger, did its revolutionary work, practicing democracy in the union movement and pushing for sovereign society in a number of ways. The autonomous labor unions, united under the Solidarity banner, strove to "recapture public life from the monopoly control of the party". On 16 December 1980, the Monument to the Fallen Shipyard Workers of 1970 was officially unveiled in Gdańsk in a ceremony that marked the high point in the ascent of Solidarity.

Among the mass protests that occurred at that time were the winter 1981 general strike in Bielsko-Biała, the nationwide warning strike in the spring of that year and hunger demonstrations in summer. The warning strike took place in the aftermath of the Bydgoszcz events (March 1981), during which the authorities resorted to violence to suppress Solidarity activists. The planned general strike was called off after Solidarity's questionable deal with the government, but the negotiators worked under a threat of Soviet intervention. Wałęsa's compromise prevented a confrontation with the regime or its foreign allies, but at the price of the protest movement's loss of some of its dynamics. During the months that followed Solidarity kept getting weaker and its popular support was no longer capable of mass determined action.

Minister Jaruzelski became also prime minister in February 1981. In June, the Soviet Central Committee pressured the Polish party for a leadership change, but Jaruzelski received strong support from the military members of the Polish Central Committee. The extraordinary IX Congress of the PZPR took place in July. Kania was reelected the party's first secretary, while the organization's internal reformers suffered a defeat.

As the economic situation kept deteriorating and the regime avoided implementation of the agreed reforms, the government and Solidarity representatives met in early August to discuss the outstanding issues. The talks ended in disagreement. During a conference of Solidarity's National Commission (a central representative policy making body) that followed, Modzelewski, Kuroń and others proposed a democratic transformation and practical arrangements by which the Union would take upon itself a major political role, participating in governing the country, accepting responsibility for the outcome and keeping social peace, thus relieving the ruling party of some of its burdens. Such a deal was seen as the only constructive way forward, but it would require government partners interested in a negotiated solution.

The existence of Solidarity and the political liberties that the movement brought paralyzed the authoritarian state and the state-controlled economy. Everyday life was becoming increasingly unbearable and the public displayed sentiments of extreme volatility. The hostility of the nomenklatura toward Solidarity was rapidly increasing.

At the State Defense Committee meeting on 13 September (the time of the Soviet Exercise Zapad-81 maneuvers and of renewed pressure on the Polish leadership), Kania was warned by the uniformed cadres that the progressing counterrevolution must be terminated by an imposition of martial law. The PZPR regional secretaries soon issued the same demands. Under the circumstances, in October First Secretary Kania stepped down and Prime Minister Jaruzelski became also the party chief.

In September and October, the First Congress of Solidarity deliberated in Gdańsk. Wałęsa faced activist opposition and was barely elected chairman of the organization. The delegates passed a radical reform program in which the word "social" or "socialized" was repeated 150 times. The congress issued a provocative call for workers in other East European countries, urging them to follow in Solidarity's footsteps. Locally authorized, increasingly "political" strikes continued. They were characterized as "wildcats" by Wałęsa, who desperately tried to impose discipline from the center. He attempted to reach an accord with the state, meeting General Jaruzelski and Catholic Primate Józef Glemp on 4 November. At the time of the regime's re-energized efforts to reduce Solidarity's role, the union had nearly ten million members — almost four times as many as the ruling party. Militant mood was displayed and unrealistic demands made at the meeting of the partially represented National Commission on 3 December, but the proceedings were wiretapped by the authorities, who then broadcast the (previously manipulated to their advantage) recordings.

The government, not consulting Solidarity, adopted a plan of economic measures that could be implemented only by force and asked parliament for extraordinary authority. In early December, Jaruzelski was pressured by his generals and colonels for an immediate forceful action and their demands were repeated at the Politburo meeting on 10 December. On 11 and 12 December Solidarity's National Commission declared 17 December the day of countrywide protest. Neither the exhausted but radicalized Solidarity nor the ruling establishment was willing or able to back down and, in the era of Brezhnev, there could be no peaceful resolution to the situation that developed. The Soviets now expressed a preference for the conflict to be resolved by the Polish authorities, but Poland, according to Karol Modzelewski, was lucky to avoid a carnage of foreign intervention. Others, including the historian Antoni Dudek, feel that there was no sufficient justification for the imposition of martial law that followed.

=== Imposition of martial law ===
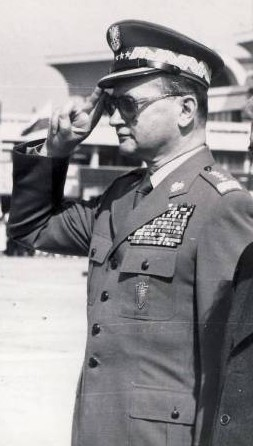
General Wojciech Jaruzelski led the People's Republic during its final decade and became one of the key players in the systemic transition of 1989–90

On 13 December 1981, claiming that the country was on the verge of economic and civil breakdown and alleging a danger of Soviet intervention, General Wojciech Jaruzelski began a crack-down on Solidarity. Martial law was declared, the free labor union was suspended and most of its leaders detained. Several thousand citizens were interned or imprisoned and much larger numbers were subjected to various forms of harassment. Polish state militia (Milicja Obywatelska, the police) and paramilitary riot police ZOMO suppressed the strike action and demonstrations. Military forces entered industrial enterprises to clamp down on the independent union movement. A series of violent attacks included the pacification of Wujek Coal Mine during which 9 people were killed. The martial law offensive was directed primarily against workers and their union; the workers, rather than intelligentsia activists, were the object of the most brutal treatment. The authorities ultimately succeeded in imposing on members of Solidarity an individual and collective trauma, from which the broken mass movement would not be able to recover. The Catholic Church strove to exert a moderating influence on Solidarity before and after the martial law.

Initially, the regime leadership intended to remold Solidarity into a compliant union, stripped of its intelligentsia advisers and compatible with the state socialist system. The failure to incite most ranking Solidarity leaders to collaborate, especially Wałęsa's refusal to extend any such cooperation, resulted in the government adopting the goal of total liquidation of the union movement.

Strikes and protests followed, but were not nearly as widespread as those of August 1980. The last mass street demonstrations that Solidarity was able to muster occurred on 31 August 1982, the second anniversary of the Gdańsk agreements. The "Military Council of National Salvation" banned Solidarity officially on 8 October. Martial law was formally lifted in July 1983, though many heightened controls on civil liberties and political life, as well as food rationing, remained in place throughout the mid-to-late 1980s. With all the restrictions, however, "the official cultural realm remained far more open than it was prior to 1980" and "cultural policy continued to be the most open in all of Eastern Europe". Among the concessions in the civil and political rights area granted by the troubled regime were the establishment of the Constitutional Tribunal in 1982 and of the Polish Ombudsman office in 1987.

In the mid-1980s and even as late as 1987, Solidarity was seen by many, including most of its activists, as likely a thing of the past. It persisted solely as a rather small underground organization, supported by various international institutions, from the Catholic Church to the Central Intelligence Agency. When most senior Solidarity figures were interned or otherwise neutralized by the authorities, Zbigniew Bujak, head of the union's Warsaw branch, remained in hiding and was the leader of the clandestine organization until his arrest in 1986. But the post-martial law general public showed signs of tiredness and disappointment, as it had become apparent that Solidarity was not a united front.^{[d1]}

=== "Market socialism" and systemic implosion ===
During the chaotic years of Solidarity and martial law, Poland entered a decade of economic crisis more pronounced than in Gierek's years. Work on the major unfinished projects that had begun in the 1970s drained the available investment outlays, little money was left for replacing obsolete production equipment and the manufactured goods were not competitive on the world market. Managerial ineffectiveness, bad organization of production and shortages of inputs and raw materials were among the factors that contributed to further deterioration of workers' morale. 640,000 people of productive age left the country between 1981 and 1988.

Throughout their existence, the governments functioning under General Jaruzelski's leadership (1981–1989) engaged in market economy reforms aimed at improving economic performance by eliminating central planning, reducing central bureaucracy, introducing self-management and self-financing of state enterprises and allowing self-government by employee councils. The reform's effects were positive but limited (the process vastly increased general economic literacy and some of its accomplishments were later claimed by Solidarity governments as their own), because enterprises' self-rule had to compete with the traditional party interference, the authorities shied from subjecting the population to hardships, and Western governments and institutions showed no interest in supporting what was perceived as reform of a communist regime. The government allowed more small-scale private enterprises to function, departing further from the 'socialist' model of economy. Ideological considerations were abandoned and priority was given to pragmatic issues and moves. Searching for ways to improve the economy and conscious of its alienation from the industrial working class, the regime turned toward market reforms with an increasingly significant from the mid-1980s elite-oriented liberal component. Marketization, formalized by a 1988 statute on economic activity, was a process that would continue past the mid-1990s. Neoliberal processes may have been initiated by Deputy Prime Minister Zdzisław Sadowski and the government of Zbigniew Messner, then developed further under Minister Mieczysław Wilczek (author of the statute) and the government of Mieczysław Rakowski. "Market socialism" was introduced as the regime leaders lost their faith in the socialist system and even nomenklatura managers were threatened by the declining economy. The enterprises were to be made independent, self-financing and self-managed, which included workers' councils that were resistant to restructuring. Owners of private businesses did well in the final years of the People's Republic and the number of such entities increased. Foreign investment was also encouraged, but limited marketization failed to deliver an economic turnaround. The practice of centralized economic decision making had not been overcome, while the newly autonomous enterprises moved toward a rather spontaneous and chaotic partial privatization of dubious legality; it included elements of kleptocracy and had a significant middle-level nomenklatura component. On a more basic level, countless ordinary Poles took advantage of the changing attitudes and became involved in a great variety of income-producing activities.

The deepening economic crisis caused a marked deterioration in quality of life of ordinary citizens and resulted in increasing political instability. Rationing and queuing became a way of life, with ration cards (kartki) necessary to buy consumer staples. The ration cards were utilized by the government in order to avoid allowing market regulation of income and prices and thus risking social unrest. As Western institutions were no longer willing to extend credit to the de facto bankrupt Polish government, access to goods that the Poles needed became even more restricted. Most of the scarce resources of Western currency available had to be used to pay the crushing rates on Poland's foreign debt, which reached US$27 billion by 1980 and US$45 billion in 1989. The government, which controlled all official foreign trade, responded by maintaining a highly artificial exchange rate with Western currencies. The exchange rate worsened distortions in the economy at all levels, resulting in a growing black market and the development of shortage economy. The omnipresent and destructive underground economy was characterized by such phenomena as bribery, waiting lists, speculation, direct exchanges between enterprises and large percentages of personal incomes deriving from secondary activities. Societal degradation was accompanied by unprecedented deterioration of biological environment and physical and mental health; mortality rates kept increasing. In the late 1980s, the PZPR feared another social explosion because of high inflation, depressed living standards and deepening public anger and frustration. The authorities themselves, facing an increasingly disorderly and unmanageable system, felt perplexed and powerless.

=== Last years of the People's Republic and the transition period ===
Fall of Communism in Poland
- Part of the Revolutions of 1989
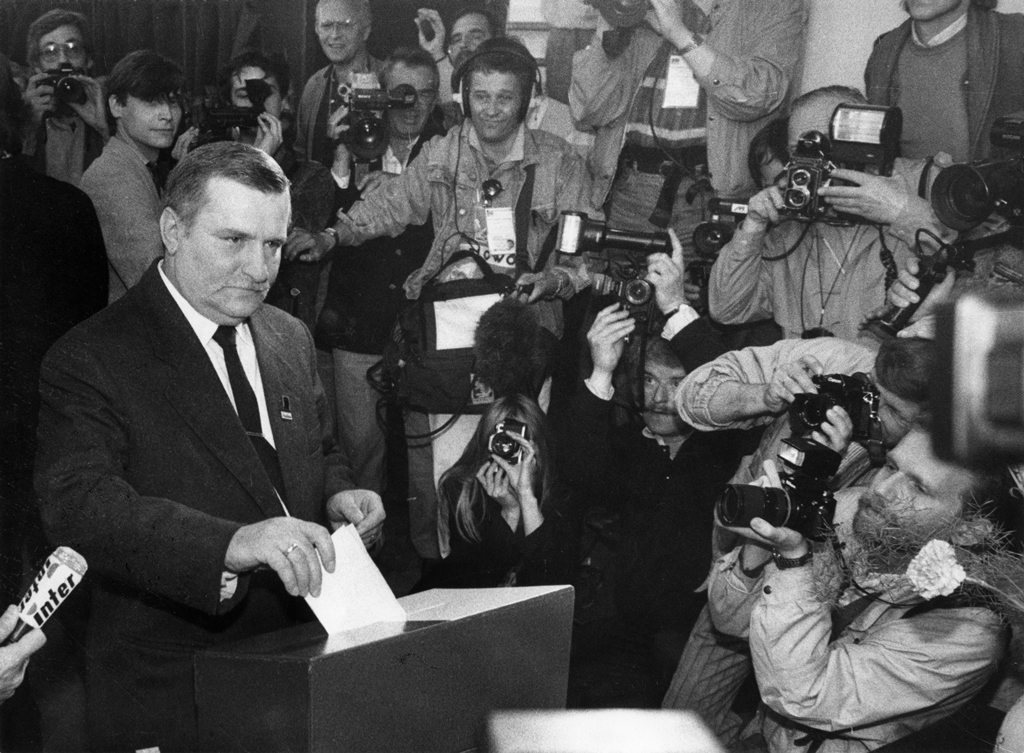
- Lech Wałęsa votes in the 1989 Polish parliamentary election
- Date: 21 April 1988 – 25 November 1991 (3 years, 7 months and 4 days)
- Location: Polish People's Republic
- Caused by: Authoritarianism; Political repression; Economic failure; Anti-communist discontent
- Goals: End of Communist rule; Democratization; Civil rights; Economic reform
- Methods: Strike actions; Civil disobedience; Civil resistance; Negotiations; Elections
- Result: End of Communist rule in Poland and establishment of a multi-party democracy: Polish Round Table Agreement (6 April 1989); 1989 Polish parliamentary election (4 and 18 June); Establishment of a non-Communist led government (24 August 1989); Proclamation of the Third Polish Republic (31 December 1989); Dismantling of the planned economy (1 January 1990); 1990 Polish presidential election (25 November and 9 December); 1991 Polish parliamentary election (27 October)

Parties
Opposition; Solidarity; Citizens' Committee; Fighting Solidarity; Confederation of Independent Poland; Orange Alternative; Working Group of the National Commission of Solidarity; Real Politics Union; Other anti-government demonstrators; Supported by: Catholic Church	(Poland) Government; Polish United Workers' Party; Patriotic Movement for National Rebirth; Citizens' Militia (MO); ZOMO; Security Service (SB)

Lead figures
Lech Wałęsa Tadeusz Mazowiecki Bronisław Geremek Jacek Kuroń Adam Michnik Zbigniew Bujak Władysław Frasyniuk Jarosław Kaczyński Leszek Balcerowicz	Wojciech Jaruzelski Mieczysław Rakowski Czesław Kiszczak Florian Siwicki Zbigniew Messner Alfred Miodowicz Jerzy Urban Aleksander Kwaśniewski Leszek Miller

==== Toward Round Table and semi-free elections ====
In September 1986, the government declared a general amnesty and began work on a number of meaningful reforms. Given the liberalized political environment, Wałęsa was urged to reconvene the National Commission from the time of the First Solidarity, but he refused, preferring to deal with the circle of Solidarity's Expert Commission advisers. A National Executive Commission, led by Wałęsa, was openly established in October 1987. Other opposition structures such as the Fighting Solidarity, the Federation of Fighting Youth, the Freedom and Peace Movement (Ruch Wolność i Pokój) and the Orange Alternative "dwarf" movement founded by Major Waldemar Fydrych began organizing street protests in form of colorful happenings that assembled thousands of participants. The liberal periodical Res Publica negotiated with the authorities its officially published release.

In the 1987 Polish political and economic reforms referendum, 67% of the eligible voters participated and most of them approved the government-proposed reforms, but a technical vote threshold was formally missed because of the unrealistically stringent passage requirements self-imposed by the regime. The referendum debacle dealt a blow to the process of market-oriented economic reforms, which had been sought by Polish governments since the early 1980s.

The ruling communist/military establishment slowly and gradually came to realize that a deal of some sort with the opposition would eventually be necessary and would have to include the leading Solidarity figures. Solidarity as such, a labor union representing workers' interests, was unable to reassert itself after the martial law and later in the 1980s was practically destroyed, but preserved in the national consciousness as a myth that facilitated social acceptance of systemic changes previously deemed unthinkable.^{[e]} The Solidarity organization as a mass movement, and with it its dominant social democratic element (supporters of democratic socialism), had been defeated. Solidarity's name had continuously been used, but the opposition movement split to form rival groups of different political orientations. According to a new intellectual consensus, "democracy was grounded not in an active citizenry, as had been argued from the mid-1970s through 1981, but in private property and a free market". The current view no longer entailed broad political participation, emphasizing instead elite leadership and a capitalist economy. Solidarity became a symbolic entity, its activists openly assumed ideological "anti-communist" positions and its leadership moved to the right. The historic mass movement was now represented by a small number of individuals, of whom Lech Wałęsa, Tadeusz Mazowiecki and Leszek Balcerowicz were about to assume particularly decisive roles. They were proponents of unfettered free market, strongly influenced by the American and West European financial and other interests.^{[n]}^{[g]}

Jaruzelski's Poland depended on low-cost deliveries of industrial staple commodities from the Soviet Union and meaningful Polish reforms, economic or political, were not feasible during the rule of the last three conservative Soviet general secretaries. The perestroika and glasnost policies of the Soviet Union's new leader, Mikhail Gorbachev, were therefore a crucial factor in stimulating reform in Poland. Gorbachev essentially repudiated the Brezhnev Doctrine, which had stipulated that attempts by its Eastern European satellite states to abandon the communist bloc would be countered by the Soviet Union with force. The developments in the Soviet Union altered the international situation and provided a historic opportunity for independent reforms in Poland. The hardline stance of US President Ronald Reagan was also helpful. David Ost stressed the constructive influence of Gorbachev. With his support for Polish and Hungarian membership in the World Bank and the International Monetary Fund and for the Eastern European pluralistic evolution in general, the Soviet leader effectively pushed the region toward the West.

Nationwide strikes broke out in the spring and summer of 1988. They were much weaker than the strikes of 1980 and were discontinued after the intervention by Wałęsa, who secured the regime's commitment to begin negotiations with the opposition. The strikes were the last act of active political involvement of the working class in the history of People's Poland and were led by young workers, not connected to Solidarity veterans and opposed to socially harmful consequences of the economic restructuring that was in progress at that time. According to the researcher Maciej Gdula, the political activity that followed was conducted exclusively by the elites. It was neither inspired by nor consulted with any mass social organization or movement, as the opposition leading circles freed themselves from their strong in the past commitment to the welfare of working people. No longer secure as undisputed leaders, Polish dissidents of the KOR-Solidarity generations were eager to bargain with the weakened regime whose economic goals they now shared.^{[q]}^{[o]}

Both sides having been prompted by the new international situation and the recent strike wave in Poland, in September 1988 preliminary talks between government representatives and Solidarity leaders ensued in Magdalenka. Numerous meetings took place involving Wałęsa and the minister of internal affairs, General Czesław Kiszczak among others, at that time and in the following year, behind the scenes of the official negotiations conducted then. In November, Wałęsa debated on national TV Alfred Miodowicz, chief of the official trade unions.^{[r]} The encounter enhanced Wałęsa's image.

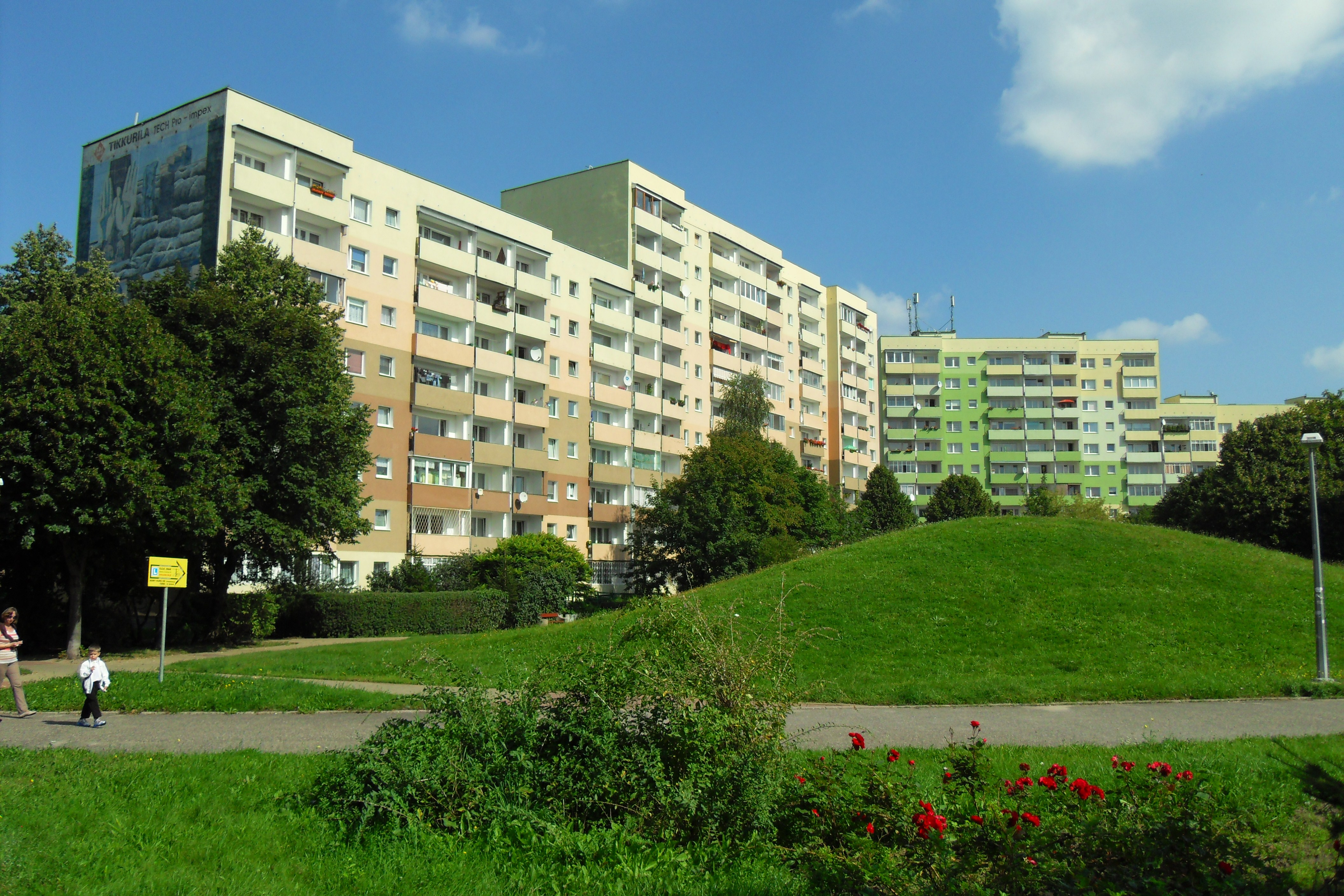
Apartment block residences built in People's Poland loom over the urban landscape of the entire country. In the past administratively distributed for permanent use, after 1989 most were sold to residents at discounted prices.

During the PZPR's plenary session of 16–18 January 1989, General Jaruzelski and his ruling formation overcame the Central Committee's resistance by threatening to resign and the party decided to allow re-legalization of Solidarity and to approach its leaders for formal talks. From 6 February to 4 April, 94 sessions of negotiations between 13 working groups, which became known as the "Round Table Talks" (Polish: Rozmowy Okrągłego Stołu), resulted in political and economic compromise reforms. Jaruzelski, Prime Minister Mieczysław Rakowski and Wałęsa did not directly participate in the negotiations. The government side was represented by Czesław Kiszczak, Aleksander Kwaśniewski, Janusz Reykowski, Stanisław Ciosek, Romuald Sosnowski, Władysław Baka, Andrzej Gdula and Ireneusz Sekuła; the Solidarity opposition by Adam Michnik, Tadeusz Mazowiecki, Bronisław Geremek, Jacek Kuroń, Zbigniew Bujak, Władysław Frasyniuk, Jarosław Kaczyński and Witold Trzeciakowski, among others. The talks resulted in the Round Table Agreement, by which political power was to be vested in a newly created bicameral legislature and in a president, who would be the chief executive.

By 4 April 1989, numerous reforms and freedoms for the opposition were agreed. Solidarity, now in existence as the Solidarity Citizens' Committee, was to be legalized again as a trade union and allowed to participate in semi-free elections. This election had restrictions imposed, designed to keep the PZPR in power, since only 35% of the seats in the Sejm, the key lower chamber of parliament, would be open to Solidarity candidates. The remaining 65% were to be reserved for candidates from the PZPR and its allies (the United People's Party, the Alliance of Democrats and the PAX Association). Since the Round Table Agreement mandated only reform (not replacement) of "real socialism" in Poland, the party thought of the election as a way of neutralizing political conflict and staying in power, while gaining some legitimacy to carry out economic reforms. However, the negotiated social policies, arrived at by economists and trade unionists during the Round Table talks, were quickly tossed out by both the party and the opposition.

A systemic transformation happening sooner rather than later was made possible by the Polish legislative elections of 4 June 1989, which coincided with the bloody crackdown on the Tiananmen Square protests in China. When the results of the voting were released, a political earthquake followed. The victory of Solidarity (caused in part by the electoral system that favored the opposition as far as the contested seats were concerned, but was permitted by the government nevertheless) surpassed all predictions. Solidarity candidates captured all the seats they were allowed to compete for in the Sejm, while in the newly established Senate they captured 99 out of the 100 available seats. At the same time, many prominent PZPR candidates failed to gain even the minimum number of votes required to capture the seats that were reserved for them. The PZPR-led coalition suffered a catastrophic blow to its legitimacy.

==== Political transformation ====
The next few months were spent on political maneuvering. The increasingly insecure communists, who still had military and administrative control over the country, were appeased by a compromise in which Solidarity allowed General Jaruzelski to remain head of state. On 19 July 1989 Jaruzelski barely won the vote in the National Assembly presidential election, even though his name was the only one on the ballot. He won through an informally arranged abstention by a sufficient number of Solidarity MPs and his position was not strong. Jaruzelski resigned as first secretary of the PZPR on 29 July.

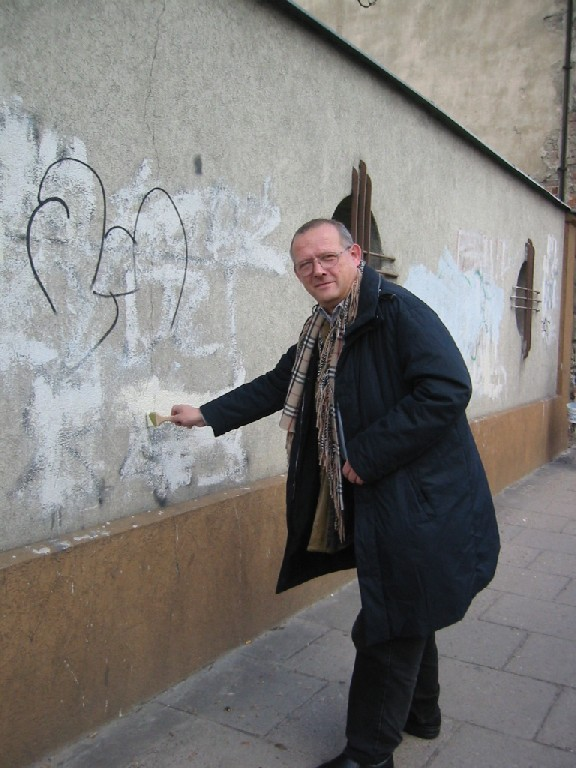
Adam Michnik, an influential leader in the transformation of Poland

The Round Table deal basically allowed the PZPR to remain in power regardless of the election results, and the party's reshuffled leadership continued to rule. On 1 August, prices were freed because of the ongoing market reforms and hyperinflation resulted. The instantly increased economic hardship caused a new wave of strikes. The strikes were spontaneous, but the Solidarity leaders, no longer in agreement with the strikers' economic demands, were able to emphasize the secondary political aspect of the strikes (anger at the party's obstinacy) and use them to pressure the regime for an expedited transfer of power. The new prime minister, General Kiszczak, who was appointed on 2 August 1989, failed to gain enough support in the Sejm to form a government and resigned on 19 August. He was the last communist head of government in Poland. Although Jaruzelski tried to persuade Solidarity to join the PZPR in a "grand coalition", Wałęsa refused. The two formerly subservient parties allied with the PZPR, prompted by the current strike pressure, were moving toward adopting independent courses and their added votes would give the opposition control of parliament. Under the circumstances, Jaruzelski had to come to terms with the prospect of the new government being formed by political opposition. Solidarity elected representative Tadeusz Mazowiecki was appointed prime minister and confirmed by the assembly on 24 August 1989. The new government led by a non-communist, the first of its kind in the Soviet Bloc, was sworn into office on 13 September.^{[v]} The PZPR did not immediately relinquish all power, remaining in the coalition and retaining control of the ministries of foreign trade, defense, interior and transport.

Mazowiecki's government, forced to deal quickly with galloping hyperinflation, soon adopted radical economic policies, proposed by Leszek Balcerowicz, which transformed Poland into a functioning market economy under an accelerated schedule. Many Polish state-owned enterprises, undergoing privatization, turned out to be woefully unprepared for capitalist competition and the pace of their accommodation (or attrition) was rapid. The economic reform, a shock therapy accompanied by comprehensive neoliberal restructuring, was, in reality, an extension of the previous incremental "communist" policies of the 1970s and 1980s, which were now followed by a leap to greatly expanded integration with the global economy with little protection.^{[s]} Among the reform's negative immediate effects were the economic recession and near-paralysis of foreign trade. On longer-term bases, the country experienced quickly rising unemployment and social inequities, as enterprises were liquidated and income was redistributed away from workers and farmers, in favor of the establishment and the entrepreneurial class.^{[m]} A collapse of Polish industry was among the detrimental consequences of fundamental and lasting importance.^{[l]}^{[y]} Labor unions underwent further marginalization; Solidarity activity as a labor union, prioritized in the past, was now suppressed.^{[z]} On the positive side, the market price-income reform balanced the economy and brought inflation under control, the currency stabilized, shortages were eliminated and significant foreign investment began. The shock therapy solutions were often dictated by Western consultants, of whom Jeffrey Sachs was best known but also most criticized.^{[c]}^{[f]}

The striking electoral victory of Solidarity candidates in the limited elections, and the subsequent formation of the first non-communist government in the region in decades, encouraged many similar peaceful transitions from communist party rule in Central and Eastern Europe in the second half of 1989.

In December 1989, changes to the Polish constitution were made, officially eliminating the "socialist" order: Marxist references were removed and the name of the country was changed back to the Polish Republic.

Wałęsa, president of the Solidarity trade union, demanded early presidential elections. He was acting against the advice of his traditional Solidarity allies, intellectuals who were now running the government. Under pressure from the continuing worker unrest, Wałęsa declared himself a supporter of workers' interests, allegedly threatened by those whom he identified as communists (such as President Jaruzelski), or elitist political liberals (such as Prime Minister Mazowiecki). Wałęsa presented himself as a person of good conservative, Christian and nationalist credentials.^{[t]}

In 1990, Jaruzelski resigned as Poland's president and was succeeded by Wałęsa, who won the 1990 presidential election. Lech Wałęsa's inauguration as president took place on 22 December 1990. He distanced himself from Wojciech Jaruzelski by accepting the prewar presidential insignia from President-in-Exile Ryszard Kaczorowski, who was stepping down. Wałęsa defeated Mazowiecki and in the second round Stanisław Tymiński, but under his presidency economic policy remained unchanged.

The historically communist Polish United Workers' Party dissolved itself in 1990 and transformed into the Social Democracy of the Republic of Poland. The German–Polish Border Treaty, signed in November 1990, resolved the sensitive for Prime Minister Mazowiecki and his government issue of recognition of Poland's western border by Germany, after the country's unification. The Warsaw Pact was formally dissolved on 1 July 1991; the Soviet Union ceased to exist in December 1991 and the last post-Soviet troops left Poland in September 1993. On 27 October 1991, the first (since the 1920s) entirely free Polish parliamentary election took place. This completed Poland's transition from a communist party rule to a Western-style liberal democratic political system.^{[i]}

== See also ==
- Former eastern territories of Germany and Recovered Territories
- Cursed soldiers
- Polish People's Republic
- Administrative division of the Polish People's Republic
- Education in the Polish People's Republic
- Culture in the Polish People's Republic
- History of Solidarity
- List of political parties in Poland

== Notes ==
a. The troops were brought in by Minister of Defense Konstantin Rokossovsky. Rokossovsky obtained permission from First Secretary Edward Ochab, who shared his assessment of the situation: a widespread counterrevolutionary activity that the militia and the security forces might be unable to contain.

b. As characterized by Jane Hardy, (1956 events were) "...the first cycle of a pattern that would re-emerge with increasing severity over the following decades. A slowdown in the ability of the economy to deliver rising standards of living, followed by revolts triggered by price increases, led to reforms based on decentralisation and worker self-management. Recentralisation, repression and reform followed in its wake." To "...a decline in the rate of economic growth and...a fall in real average wages...the ruling class would react by introducing more control in enterprises, a higher turnover of managerial and political cadres, intensified propaganda against ideological revisionism, the suspension of certain investment projects and the reallocation of investment favouring the consumption goods sector and services." But from the late 1960s, "a policy of extensive growth could no longer deliver positive rates of growth and increasing standards of living."

c. Mazowiecki and Balcerowicz had vastly greater freedom of economic action than their predecessors because neither Gierek nor Jaruzelski could consider triggering high unemployment (it would violate the symbolic legitimation of workers as the ruling class). The Western economies responded to crisis situations from the 1970s onward by utilizing the existing free-market flexibilities (deregulation, downsizing, anti-trade union legislation, moving cheap manufacturing to the Third World countries etc.) ever more easily under the newly dominant neoliberal policies. Such remedies were not available before 1989 for the ruling establishments in Central and Eastern Europe.

d. Karol Modzelewski wrote the following on the controversial issue of popular support for communist reforms in Stalinist Poland:

"...the extent of social support for the communist power and its undertakings was considerable. Especially as it regards the rebuilding and industrialization of the country, which before the war belonged to the European underdeveloped zone, widespread dissemination of education and the availability of higher education for the youth from peasant and worker families. The mass social advancement related to such transformations naturally affected the attitudes of millions of people, especially the young, for whom People's Poland opened the previously unavailable opportunities."

Modzelewski qualified this view by stressing the greatly limited access to impartial information. Society was intensely indoctrinated at the official level, while families at home, to protect their youth, refrained from criticizing the regime or discussing issues that were deemed not safe.

e. Maciej Gdula summarized Solidarity's demise and its subsequent mythologizing as follows:

"Solidarity was put in a golden sarcophagus and turned into a myth, which was supposed to legitimize the change of 1989. But the movement at that time was dead: it was falling apart already in 1981 and it was finished off by the martial law. However, it was precisely this external termination that opened the possibility of its rebirth as a myth."

"...the new order was legitimized to a great extent by the myth of Solidarity. The time between the martial law and the Round Table had to be compressed to make an impression of continuity. There was a moment of lapse, the story went, but then society woke up again and reclaimed power."

f. The Balcerowicz Plan enjoyed a consensus of opinion of Polish legislators, who supported it across the political spectrum, together with President Jaruzelski. However, Michael Bruno, chief of advisers of the International Monetary Fund, was surprised when Mazowiecki's government chose the harshest of the transformation plans presented by the fund. Jane Hardy argued that "a particularly pernicious ideologically reactionary variant of neoliberalism" had been produced in Poland. Czechoslovakia and Hungary did not opt for a radical liberal changeover and their systemic conversions resulted in lower than in Poland levels of social inequalities.

According to the economist Zdzisław Sadowski, the Poles were generally euphoric about the end of the era of communist rule and Soviet domination. Because of the belief that the Balcerowicz Plan would quickly result in universal Western-like prosperity, the plan enjoyed broad social support, which would cause any conceivable competing pursuits of more moderate economic policies to be politically unrealistic.

According to Rafał Woś, "...Poland was a peripheral country, it moved from one relationship of dependence to another, was in a very weak position. The international financial institutions treated our elites like children, not partners. ... But even then, there was some room for maneuver."

g. Among the critics of the prevailing right wing ideology and practice of the Polish transformation were Karol Modzelewski and Tadeusz Kowalik. Other "prescient voices" listed by David Ost were Ryszard Bugaj, Barbara Labuda, Włodzimierz Pankow and Józef Pinior. The Solidarity Working Group, led by Andrzej Gwiazda, Marian Jurczyk and Jan Rulewski, was opposed in 1989 to the course adopted by the PZPR-Solidarity negotiators.

h. Employee councils that Solidarity managed to push through survived the martial law and the 1980s, only to be eliminated by Leszek Balcerowicz.

i. The historian Andrzej Leon Sowa characterized the outcome of the Polish transition as follows: "Part of the nomenklatura, combined with the elites originating from the opposition (intelligentsia and middle bureaucracy, forming the new but engendered by the previous system urban class), became the beneficiaries of the system that developed over the ruins of People's Poland. As a whole, however, both the PZPR and the worker in its bulk Solidarity lost. The only organization ... strengthened in every respect is the institutional Roman Catholic Church." According to the journalist Kaja Puto, the 2015 Polish parliamentary election marked Poland's rejection of the myth of successful transformation and the end of the Polish post-communist period. Karol Modzelewski sees the 2015 elections and their outcome as a path to collapse of Polish democracy and direct consequence of the faulty systemic transformation, beginning with the destruction of socialist industry. The transformation's victims and their descendants have experienced lasting social degradation and became disheartened adversaries of the post-1989 liberal democracy, which failed them and which (in 2015) may have ended.

j. The name Solidarność (Solidarity) was proposed by Karol Modzelewski, who also insisted on and pushed through the formation of a single countrywide union. The Expert Commission of the Inter-Enterprise Strike Committee thought the idea was unrealistic and planned only to register a number of regional unions. The movement remained significantly decentralized though, with local branches enjoying considerable autonomy.

k. Uniquely in the Soviet camp, from 1956 Polish institutions of higher learning enjoyed considerable autonomy. Statutory elimination of academic self-rule and existing protections in the area of intellectual freedom was carried out by the authorities following the 1968 unrest.

l. The processes of the Polish transformation resulted in a considerable loss of economic potential and people who depended on such potential were deprived of means to support their existence. Gross national income dropped by over 18% within two years, which in Poland amounted to a deepest recession since the Great Depression crisis of 1929–33. The ideologically motivated, frenetic privatization, a sell-out of best state enterprises for a fraction of their worth, was called by Aleksander Małachowski a "reform by ruin". According to Karol Modzelewski (2013), the psychological, cultural and political consequences of the social degradation experienced still burden everyday life of the Poles and threaten the regained freedom. The trauma of the great transformation has been exploited by right-wing populists. David Ost wrote the following (2016), referring to the "post-communist" Democratic Left Alliance, its ascent to power and its decline in 1993–1997 and 2001–2005: "Twice before PiS first came to power, parties aligned with the liberal left secured strong labor support. But by insisting on marketization, privatization and participation (as a peripheral player) in the global capitalist economy, and disparaging demands for more security, they soon squandered that support and ended up driving regular workers into the arms of PiS." Then in 2007–2015, "market liberals of Civic Platform ... pursued a pragmatic politics of adapting to the European Union ... while suicidally pursuing a hard agenda against workers." Economic insecurity having fueled the rise of the Right as elsewhere in Europe, "Kaczyński won in 2015 by focusing on economic issues" and because of PiS' "promise of economic security".

m. Drastic cuts were implemented in progressive taxation and public spending, including on welfare. Income and wealth were massively redistributed toward a small number of people at the top at the price of impoverishment of a large number at the bottom. The unemployment had reached an all-time high of 20% by the end of 2003, just before the European Union membership came to the rescue. As a result of high unemployment, it took at least a decade for the average real pay to reach the level from before 1989 and joining the Union triggered the greatest peacetime wave of permanent economic migration out of the country. The reforms undertaken by the Polish elites were of an overwhelmingly economic character. Their socially detrimental consequences included the lasting political polarization over the practically limited range of choices: economic liberalism lacking any communal concerns on the one hand, and the conservative, patriarchal and parochial backwaters of Polish nationalism on the other.

n. Polish intellectuals and leaders of the 1980s were affected by the shifted economic and political thinking in the West, now dominated by the neoliberal and neoconservative policies of Friedrich Hayek, Milton Friedman, Margaret Thatcher and Ronald Reagan.

o. Sixty percent of the Polish workforce were manual laborers (skilled and unskilled) or farmworkers. They had become passive objects in the systemic transition processes, but provided the votes needed by the Solidarity intelligentsia elite in order to achieve its domination and implement the changes that the leaders intended.

p. In 1980, according to David Ost, "intellectuals first proclaimed an inseparable connection of labor and democracy, thus establishing the claim they would spend most of the rest of the decade trying to dismantle". Later in the 1980s and in the 1990s workers will be defined by intellectuals as irrational, misguided and even dangerous, because of their "illegitimate" opposition to the "necessary", "correct" and "rational" economic policies, pursued especially by the new post-1989 liberal establishment and couched by it in the absolute language of science, not in relative terms of a political debate. Ost concludes that the liberals "got it wrong" and made "their fatal error": they drove the critics of their reform toward an ideological and intolerant Right. The abandonment, rejection and exclusion would thus push many workers, labor activists and others into right-wing populism and religious nationalism (the marginalized in 1989 but later resurgent illiberal camp), while the liberal elite would pay with a steady erosion of its authority. The liberals' approach revealed "a fundamental misunderstanding of what democracy is and how best to consolidate it". In the end the liberals, misguided in their belief that "liberal democracy could be grounded solely in private property", ignored in the post-1989 discourse not only the material but also the symbolic and emotional levels. They adopted a hostile attitude toward their labor base and had thus "squandered their moral and political authority", making it possible for the politically illiberal populist Right to fill the resulting societal vacuum. The illiberal Right had been able to flourish by proffering only fictitious enemies and symbolic appeasement.

q. David Ost described the situation as follows: "As democratic reform became a real possibility, intellectuals sought to legitimate their emerging class interests. Political liberalism they shared with labor, but not economic liberalism, which is what they emphasized now. In doing so, they spoke the language that the party was now speaking, which eventually made them attractive partners for the party elite."

r. The All-Poland Alliance of Trade Unions (OPZZ) was established by the government in 1984, following the martial law ban on all trade union activity. It was shunned by underground Solidarity activists, who pressured past Solidarity members and its present sympathizers not to get involved with this initiative.

s. Neoliberalism and shock therapy were presented to the Polish public as a rational (scientific, based on mathematical economics) and merit-based, nonpolitical and objective system. The supposedly natural (biological) character of the systemic changes was stressed. The Central European myth of the West was used as a justification for the radical economic transformations, but at the same time the Poles were fed the already discredited in Western social sciences argumentation evoking social Darwinism.

t. Wałęsa'a election campaign and its approach, worked out together with Jarosław Kaczyński, according to David Ost amounted to the beginning of Poland's era of "neoliberal populism": a practice of transforming social anger provoked by deprivation and economic difficulties through redirecting it to issues and targets that were non-economic, political and unrelated to the causes of that anger. While Wałęsa declared a "war at the top" in order to unseat the liberal leaders (his former protégés), his current allies the Kaczyński brothers in a related move established a new party, the Center Alliance (May 1990). The Alliance combined extreme anti-communism with a pursuit of accelerated neoliberal economic reforms.

u. Following the current enforcement activity and in the wake of citizen discontent in the following years, a massive expansion of the ORMO force was undertaken; at its peak in 1979 it reached over 450,000 members.

v. David Ost identified Tadeusz Mazowiecki, Bronisław Geremek, Jacek Kuroń and Adam Michnik as the most influential members of the (formerly opposition) intellectual elite during the early post-communist period. He characterized them as liberals in the political, but especially in the economic sense. They "sponsored Leszek Balcerowicz and persuaded Wałęsa to approve. ... Their aim was to ... allow painful economic changes and unpopular capitalist class formation to occur". "The very language that in 1980 both underpinned and promoted an engaged civil society, providing the theoretical foundation for the struggle against communism, was used after 1989 to legitimate policies aimed at creating and empowering a new dominant class."

w. The party leaders, conscious of the 1970 Gomułka's precedent and fearful of its repeat, tried to forestall the price rises but eventually accepted the harsh package forced by Prime Minister Piotr Jaroszewicz. Leonid Brezhnev and other Soviet leaders applied strong pressure in an attempt to prevent the fateful move by the Polish regime.

x. The leftist in the 1960s democratic opposition regrouped in the 1970s in a different form, giving up in process much of its leftist moral affiliation. Defeated in 1968 by the regime which took advantage of the opposition's social isolation, the opposition activists opted for an alliance with the Polish Catholic Church. The alliance ended the opposition's isolation and legitimated the movement in popular perception. However, the cost for the Left was a surrender of its fundamental value system (the mainstream opposition could thus no longer be considered leftist), and in the long run granting the Right the upper hand in the ability to mobilize mass political support. The opposition's alliance with the Church (before 1989 and after, when it became the ruling establishment) is also responsible, according to the cultural philosopher Andrzej Leder, for the marginalization of the Left and its social concept in the political spectrum of democratic Poland. In 1977 Adam Michnik published his pivotal book Kościół, lewica, dialog ('The Church, the Left, the dialogue'). It marks the ideological transformation (capitulation in the political and cultural sense) of the opposition movement that soon resulted in the formation and domination in Poland of the liberal-conservative consensus.

y. The old industry left behind well-qualified workforce. Its existence turned out to be valuable for a peripheral economy resource because Poland became a major (for international capital) source of inexpensive labor, both inside and outside the country. In Poland however, the availability of low-cost labor was used by entrepreneurs as a tool for competitiveness and discouraged investing in technical improvements, creativity and innovation.

z. Unlike labor union members in the West, the Polish post-transformation unionist could not conceive of an adversarial or competitive relationship between themselves and the new capitalist owners of their places of employment. In a survey conducted in 1994, most Polish unionists, in both the Solidarity and OPZZ main unions, saw their proper role as promoters and facilitators of the market reform and privatization processes, not in protecting themselves from the shock therapy effects. Such attitude, conditioned by their historical experience and current government propaganda, rendered the workers unable to defend their class interests under the new system.

a1. The philosopher Andrzej Leder wrote of the post-war "departure from the mentality defined by the village and folwark toward one determined by the city and urban lifestyle", which facilitated the later expansion of the middle class in Poland. Between 1956 and 1968 the modern urban culture was established, and the entire 1944–1989 period meant irreversible destruction of the previously existing social and class barriers, including the realms of culture and customs.

b1. Andrzej Leder gives the following figures, quoting Andrzej Paczkowski and Henryk Słabek. Of the 4.7 million people who populated the Recovered Territories in 1945–1950, 2.9 million came from central and south-eastern provinces of the new Polish territory and over 1.5 million from what had become the Soviet Union; smaller numbers of settlers arrived from France, Germany and other countries. From February 1946 to the end of 1948, 2.2 million Germans had to leave Poland (Paczkowski). 2.8 million Poles returned to Poland after the war from Germany and other parts of Western Europe (out of the total of 3.0–3.5 million war-displaced who were present there) and many of them settled in the Recovered Territories. (Słabek).

c1. Andrzej Leder wrote (2014) of the mass migration from rural areas to urban centers: "The consequence ... of the extermination during the German occupation of Jewish urban people and the destruction by Stalinist communism of the dominant position of state functionary, military and intellectual elites originating from szlachta, was the creation of an enormous and multi-dimensional sphere for advancement. Cities became widely open and were rapidly overtaken by all those who bothered to make the move. Such people, actually their children and grandchildren, today make-up the basic skeleton of social structure.

d1. According to Andrzej Leder, Jaruzelski's martial law (supported at the time of its imposition by about 50% of Poles) and its aftermath have had strongly deleterious long-term effects on social and political developments in Poland. The trauma caused by the deprivation of the collective sense of self-determination (acquired during the Solidarity period) atomized society and prevented future politically moderate and socially responsible undertakings and movements, creating a social vacuum, which was eventually filled by individualistic neoliberalism and right-wing nationalism.

== Bibliography ==
- Biskupski, M. B. B. (2018). The History of Poland. Westport: Greenwood Publishing.
- Curry, J., & Fajfer, L. (Eds.). (1996). Poland’s Permanent Revolution: Peoples vs. Elites, 1956–1990. Washington, D.C.: American University Press.
- Domber, G. F. (2014). Empowering Revolution: America, Poland, and the End of the Cold War. Chapel Hill: University of North Carolina Press
- Fidelis, M. (2010). Women, Communism, and Industrialization in Postwar Poland. Cambridge: Cambridge University Press.
- Fidelis, M. (2022). Imagining the World from Behind the Iron Curtain: Youth and the Global Sixties in Poland. Oxford: Oxford University Press.
- Huener, J. (2003). Auschwitz, Poland, and the Politics of Commemoration, 1945–1979 (Polish and Polish American Studies). Athens: Ohio University Press.
- Kemp-Welch, A. (2008). Poland under Communism. A Cold War History. Cambridge: Cambridge University Press.
- Kenney, P. (1997). Rebuilding Poland: Workers and Communists, 1945–1950. Ithaca: Cornell University Press.
- Kersten, K. (1991). The Establishment of Communist Rule in Poland, 1943–1948. Berkeley: University of California Press.
- Kornbluth, A. (2021). The August Trials: The Holocaust and Postwar Justice in Poland. Cambridge: Harvard University Press.

Kozdra, J. R. (2017). “What sort of communists are you?” The struggle between nationalism and ideology in Poland between 1944 and 1956. Edith Cowan University.

- Labedz, L. (Ed.). (1984). Poland under Jaruzelski. New York: Scribner.
- Lebow, K. A. (2013). Unfinished Utopia: Nowa Huta, Stalinism, and Polish Society, 1949–56. Ithaca: Cornell University Press.
- Lemańczyk, M. (2019). The Plight of German Residents of Post-War Poland and Their Identity Issues. The Polish Review, 64(2), 60–78.
- Lepak, K. J. (1988). Prelude to Solidarity: Poland and the Politics of the Gierek Regime. New York: Columbia University Press.
- Leslie, R. (2009). The History of Poland Since 1863 (Cambridge Russian, Soviet and Post-Soviet Studies). Cambridge: Cambridge University Press.
- Lipski, J. J. (1985). A History of Kor: The Committee for Workers’ Self-Defence. Berkeley: University of California Press.
- Lukowski, J., & Zawadzki, H. (2019). A Concise History of Poland (3rd edition). Cambridge: Cambridge University Press.
- Meng, M. (2011). Shattered Spaces: Encountering Jewish Ruins in Postwar Germany and Poland. Cambridge: Harvard University Press.
- Monticone, P. R. C. (1986). The Catholic Church in Communist Poland 1945-1985. Boulder: East European Monographs.
- Nomberg-Przytyk, S. (2022). Communist Poland: A Jewish Woman’s Experience (H. Levitsky & J. Włodarczyk, Eds.; P. Parsky, Trans.) (Lexington Studies in Jewish Literature). London: Lexington Books.
- Plocker, A. (2022). The Expulsion of Jews from Communist Poland: Memory Wars and Homeland Anxieties. Bloomington: Indiana University Press.
- Prażmowska, A. (2010). Poland: A Modern History. London: I. B. Tauris.
- Rogalski, W. (2019). The Polish Resettlement Corps 1946-1949: Britain’s Polish Forces. * Lipski, J. J. (1985). A History of Kor: The Committee for Workers’ Self-Defence. Berkeley: University of California Press.

Warwick: Helion and Company.

- Stehle, H. (1965). The Independent Satellite: Society and Politics in Poland Since 1945. New York: Frederick A. Praeger.
- Szczerski, A. (2016). Global Socialist Realism: The Representation of Non-European Cultures in Polish Art of the 1950s. In J. Bazin, P. D. Glatigny, & P. Piotrowski (Eds.), Art beyond Borders: Artistic Exchange in Communist Europe (1945-1989) (pp. 439–452). Budapest: Central European University Press.
- Tismaneanu, V. (Ed.). (2009). Stalinism Revisited: The Establishment of Communist Regimes in East-Central Europe (New Edition). Central European University Press.
- Torańska, T. (1987). Oni: Stalin’s Polish Puppets. New York: Random House.
- Will, J. E. (1984). Church and State in the Struggle for Human Rights in Poland. Journal of Law and Religion, 2(1), 153–176.
- Wojdon, J. (2012). The Impact of Communist Rule on History Education in Poland. Journal of Educational Media, Memory & Society, 4(1), 61–77.
- Zysiak, Agata (2015)Modernizing science: between a liberal, social, and socialistic university--the case of Poland and the University of Łódź (1945-1953), Cambridge University Press 28(2):215-36. doi: 10.1017/S0269889715000083.

=== Fall of communism and Solidarity ===
- Ascherson, N. (1982). The Polish August: The Self-Limiting Revolution. New York: Penguin Books.
- Bloom, J. M. (2014). Political Opportunity Structure, Contentious Social Movements, and State-Based Organizations: The Fight Against Solidarity Inside the Polish United Workers Party. Social Science History, 38(3–4), 359–388.
- Braun, K. (1993). The Underground Theater in Poland under Martial Law during the Last Years of Communism (1981-1989). The Polish Review, 38(2), 159–186.
- Garton Ash, T. (1990). The Magic Lantern: The Revolution of ’89 Witnessed in Warsaw, Budapest, Berlin and Prague. New York: Random House.
- Garton Ash, T. (2002). The Polish Revolution: Solidarity (Third Edition). New Haven: Yale University Press.
- Gompert, D. C., Binnendijk, H., & Lin, B. (2014). The Soviet Decision Not to Invade Poland, 1981. In Blinders, Blunders, and Wars: What America and China Can Learn (pp. 139–150). Rand Corporation.
- Hayden, J. (2012). Poles Apart: Solidarity and the New Poland. London: Routledge.
- Kamiński, B. (2016). The Collapse of State Socialism: The Case of Poland (Princeton Legacy Library). Princeton: Princeton University Press.
- Kubik, J. (1994). The Power of Symbols Against the Symbols of Power: The Rise of Solidarity and the Fall of State Socialism in Poland. Philadelphia: Pennsylvania State University Press.
- Laba, R. (2016). The Roots of Solidarity: A Political Sociology of Poland’s Working-Class Democratization (Princeton Legacy Library). Princeton: Princeton University Press.
- Lipski, J. J. (2022). KOR: A History of the Workers’ Defense Committee in Poland 1976–1981 (O. Amsterdam & G. M. Moore, Trans.). Berkeley: University of California Press.
- Mastny, V. (1999). The Soviet Non-Invasion of Poland in 1980-1981 and the End of the Cold War. Europe-Asia Studies, 51(2), 189–211.
- Raina, P. (1985). Poland 1981: Towards Social Renewal. New York: Unwin Hyman/HarperCollins.
- Stachura, P. D. (1999). Poland in the Twentieth Century. New York: St. Martin's Press.
- Zamoyski, A. (2009). Poland: A History. New York: Hippocrene Books.
