= Anna Walentynowicz =

Polish free trade union activist

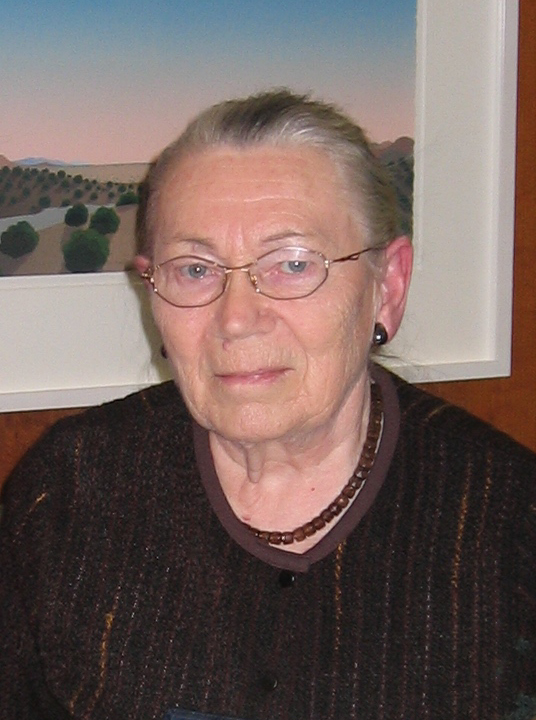
- Anna Walentynowicz (2005)
- Born: Anna Lubczyk; 15 August 1929; Sinne, Volhynia, Second Polish Republic (now Rivne Oblast, Ukraine)
- Died: 10 April 2010 (aged 80); Smolensk, Russia
- Occupation: Free trade union activist

Anna Walentynowicz (Polish pronunciation: [ˈanna valɛntɨˈnɔvʲit͡ʂ]; née Lubczyk; 15 August 1929 – 10 April 2010) was a Polish trade unionist and co-founder of Solidarity, the first recognised independent trade union in the Eastern Bloc. Her firing from her job at the Lenin Shipyard in Gdańsk in August 1980 was the event that ignited the strike at the shipyard, set off a wave of strikes across Poland, and quickly paralyzed the Baltic coast. The Interfactory Strike Committee (MKS) based in the Gdańsk shipyard eventually transformed itself into Solidarity; by September, more than one million workers were on strike in support of the 21 demands of MKS, making it the largest strike ever.

Walentynowicz's arrest became an organizing slogan (Bring Anna Walentynowicz Back to Work!) in the early days of the Gdańsk strike. She is referred to by some as the "mother of independent Poland." She was among the dignitaries killed in the 2010 Polish Air Force Tu-154 crash near Smolensk in Russia, which also claimed the lives of Lech Kaczyński, the President of Poland and his wife, and the senior commanders of the Polish Armed Forces.

In 2006, she was awarded Poland's highest honour, the Order of the White Eagle. In 2020, Time magazine included her on the list of 100 Women of the Year who influenced the world over the last 100 years.

== Early life and career ==
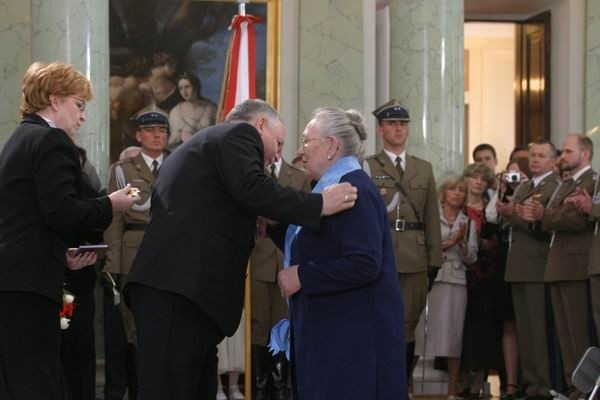
President Lech Kaczyński decorates Anna Walentynowicz (3 May 2006)

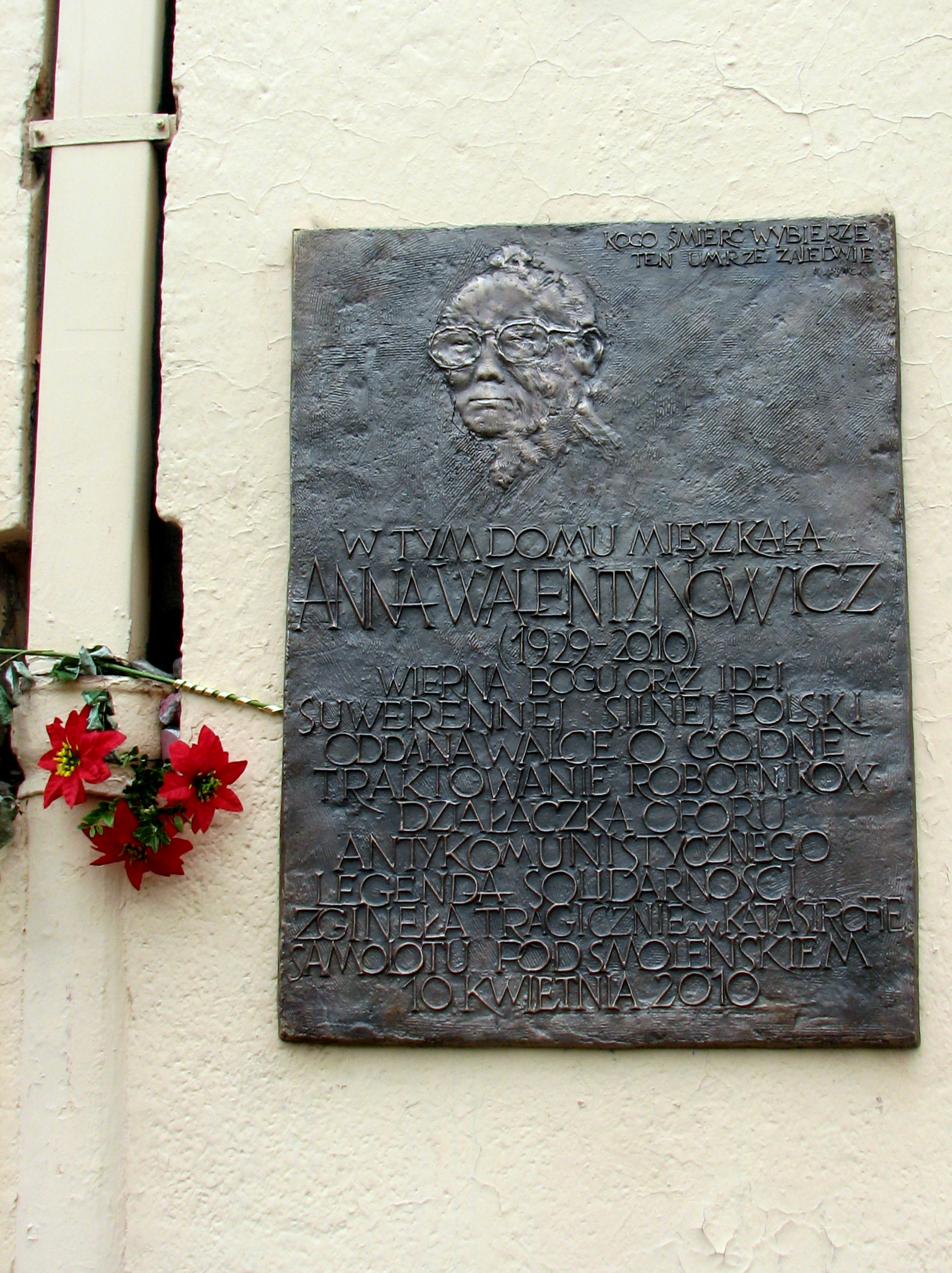
Plaque dedicated to Walentynowicz, seen on the house where she lived until her death.

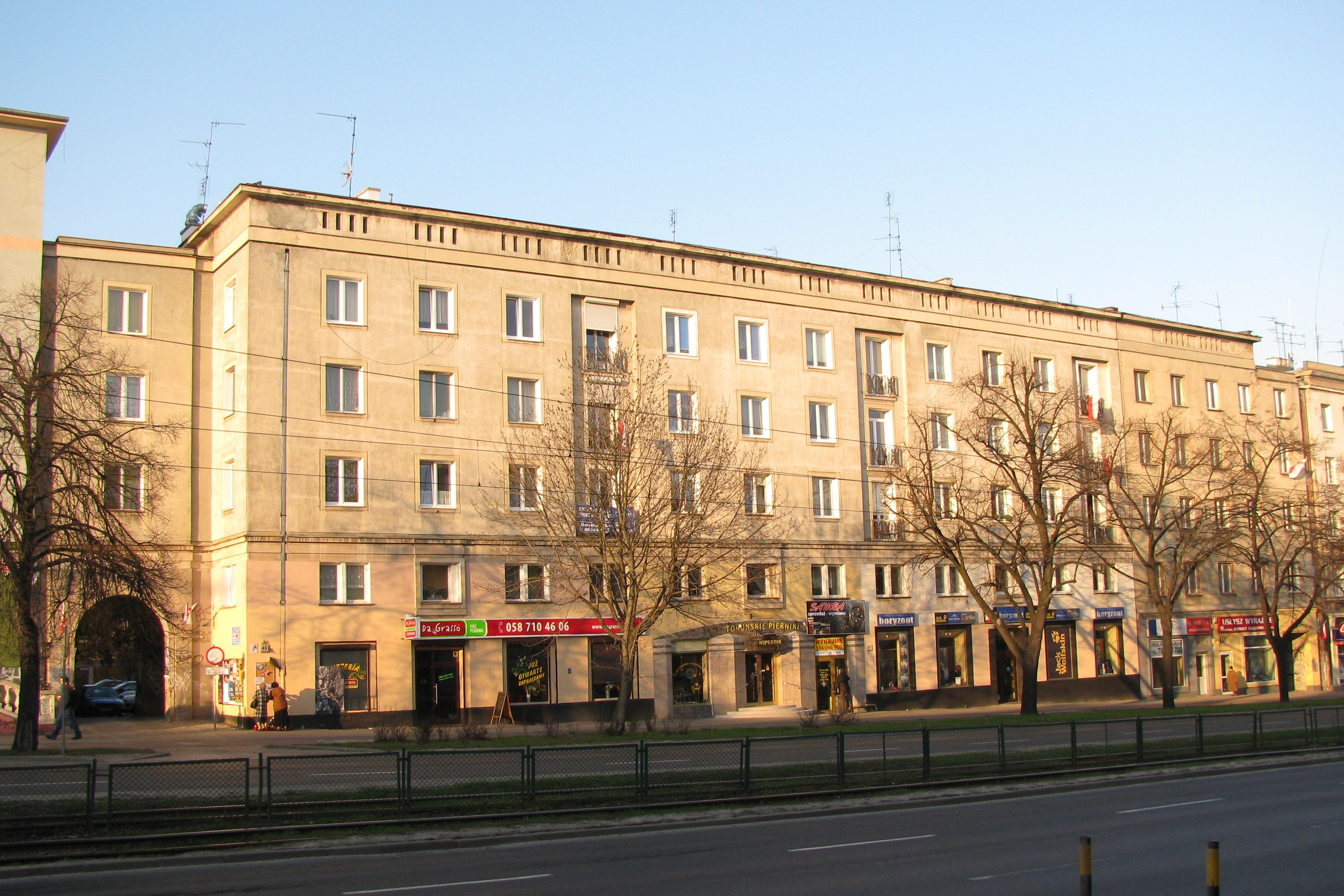
Building in Gdańsk-Wrzeszcz where Anna Walentynowicz lived (2010 photo)

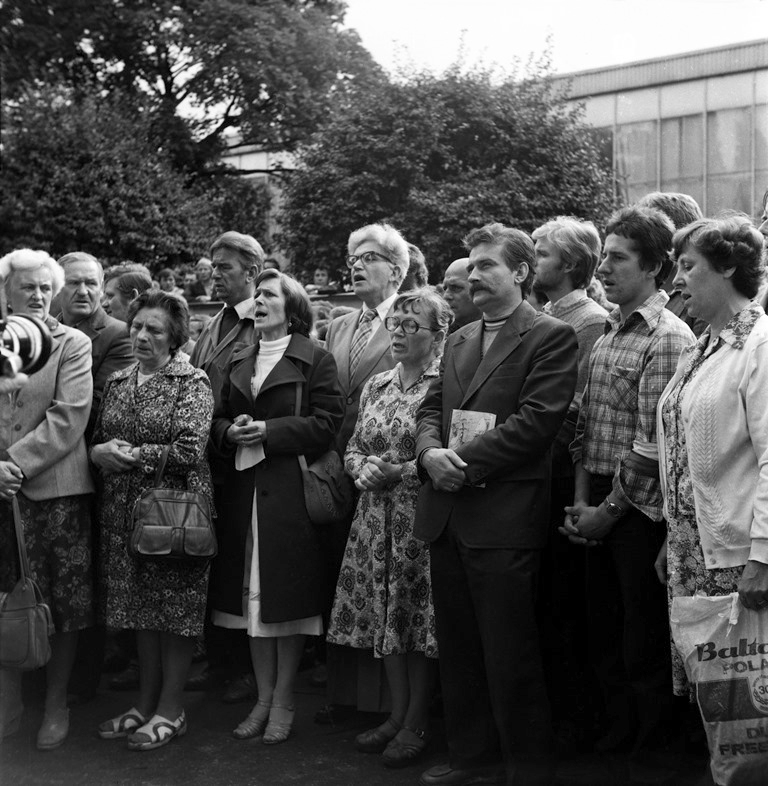
Anna Walentynowicz and Lech Wałęsa attend a mass at the Lenin Shipyard in August 1980

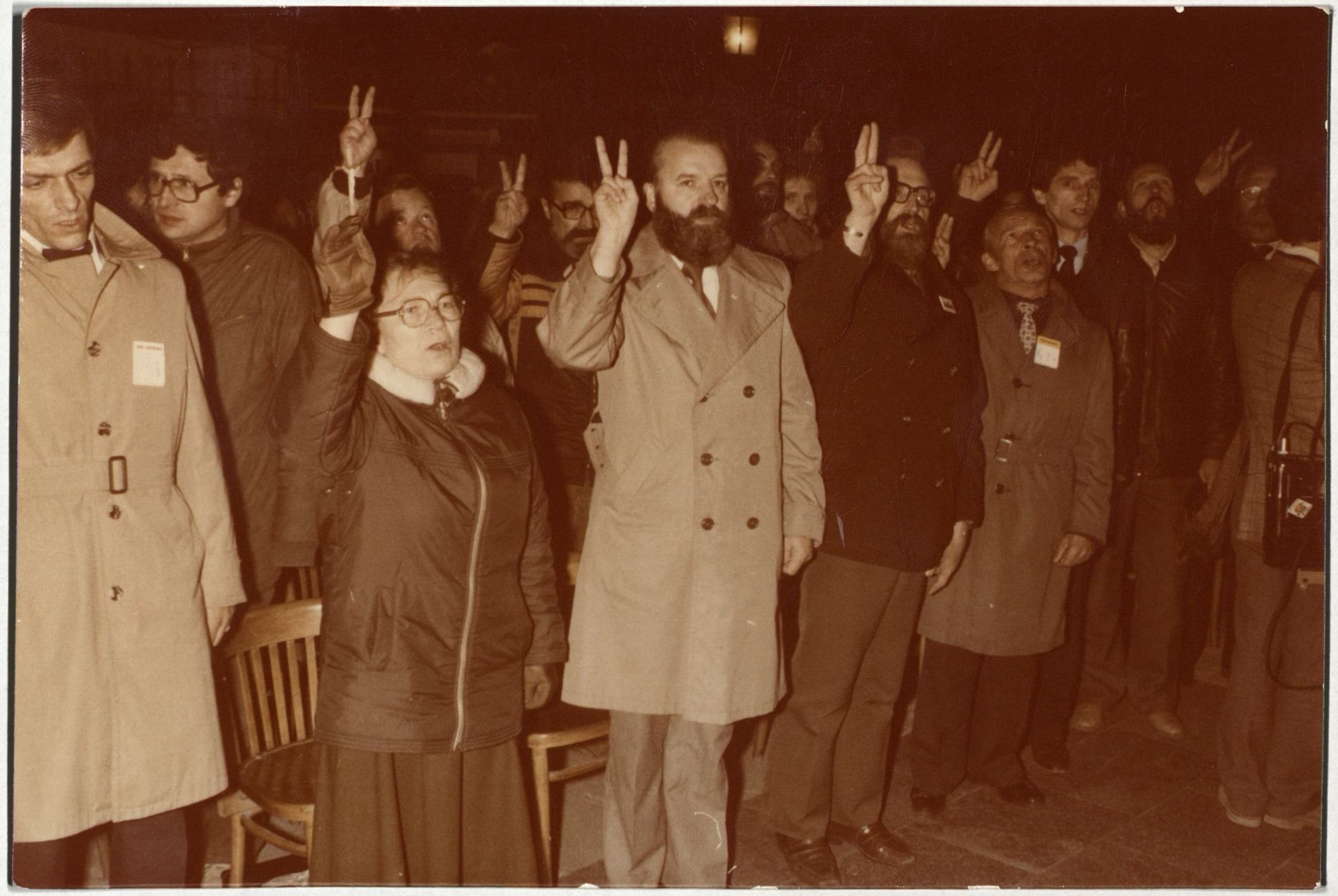
The mass for the homeland. In the first row: Anna Walentynowicz (Warsaw, 1983)

Walentynowicz was born in 1929 in the village of Sinne, Poland (today Sadove, Ukraine) in Rivne oblast, as Anna Lubczyk, to a family of Ukrainian Shtundists. During the Second World War at the age of ten she began to work as a maid. Later, after the war, she migrated into Poland. Walentynowicz began working in the Lenin Shipyard in Gdańsk, Poland in 1950, first as a welder, later as a crane operator. Recognized as a "Hero of Socialist Labor" or Stakhanovite for her hard work, Walentynowicz became disillusioned with the communist system in Poland, especially after the bloody events in December 1970 on the Baltic Coast. While she was an activist and a member of a socialist youth organization, she was never formally a member of the communist party. Anna was a devout Catholic, who believed in social justice and standing up against oppression, and who became deeply moved in her later years by the teachings of Pope John Paul II, with whom she developed a personal relationship. One of the last letters which John Paul II wrote was to Anna Walentynowicz wishing her speedy recovery from a back injury.

Anna began her quest for justice by speaking out publicly when one of her supervisors stole money from the workers' bonus fund to play the lottery. Instead of reprimanding the corrupt supervisor, the system turned on her—she was harassed by secret police. The 'exemplary worker' and 'Hero of Socialist Labor' had become a vocal dissident.

== Trade union activism ==
Walentynowicz joined the newly formed WZZ or Free Trade Unions of the Coast in 1978, and in the early 1980s came to symbolize the opposition movement, along with her colleagues from the WZZ, Lech Wałęsa, Andrzej Gwiazda, Bogdan Borusewicz, Alina Pienkowska, Bogdan Lis, the Wyszkowski brothers and Andrzej Kołodziej. As editor of the Polish samizdat (bibuła) Robotnik Wybrzeża (The Coastal Worker), she distributed an underground newsheet at the shipyard; she often challenged the authorities, it was not uncommon for her to openly challenge her superiors.

=== Firing, and birth of Solidarity ===
For participation in the illegal trade union, Walentynowicz was fired by the shipyard on 7 August 1980, 5 months prior to her plan to retire. This management decision enraged the workers, who staged a strike action on 14 August, defending Anna Walentynowicz, and demanding her return. In early coverage of the Gdańsk strike by Western press (which was permitted into the shipyard), Anna Walentynowicz is mentioned earlier than Lech Wałęsa. She also headed the list of the strike committee of the Gdańsk shipyard typed by Lech Wałęsa. On the third day of the strike, 16 August 1980, management granted Lenin Shipyard workers their working and pay demands. Lech Wałęsa and others announced the end of the strike. The women of the shipyard, Anna Waletynowicz and Alina Pienkowska, are credited in most eyewitness accounts for transforming a strike over bread and butter issues into a solidarity strike in solidarity with other striking establishments. Walentynowicz and Pienkowska managed to close the gates of the shipyard and keep some workers inside, but many workers went home, only to return by the next day.

Wałęsa was stopped near the Gate no° 1 as he was leaving, and was persuaded to change his plans and return to the shipyard.

The Gdańsk Agreement was signed on 31 August 1980, recognizing the right to organize free trade unions independent of the Party for the first time in the Communist bloc. When the Solidarity trade union was registered shortly after the Gdańsk Agreement, it had nearly ten million members, the world's largest union to date.

Walentynowicz said:

Our aim should not be to secure a somewhat thicker slice of bread today, even if this would make us happy; we must not forget what our real aim is. Our main duty is to consider the needs of others. If we become alive to this duty, there will be no unjustly treated people in our midst, and we, in turn, shall not be treated unjustly. Our day-to-day motto should be: "Your problems are also my problems." We must extend our friendship and strengthen our solidarity.

Anna Walentynowicz was a member of the Presidium of MKS. After the strike, she became a member of the Presidium of Inter-Institute Founding Committee (MKZ – Międzyzakładowy Komitet Założycielski) of NSZZ Solidarity in Gdańsk. On 1 April 1981 the Presidium of the Lenin Shipyard Institute Commission (KZ – Komisja Zakładowa) of NSZZ Solidarity 'recalled' her from the Presidium of MKZ on trumped up accusations (inciting strike action, collecting signatures for a vote of no-confidence in Wałęsa, misrepresenting her constituents, and acting in a manner detrimental to the union). As a commission of inquiry determined, not only were all of these charges false, but the KZ Presidium had no jurisdictional right to remove Walentynowicz from her MKZ position. However, a number of Solidarity departmental cells in the shipyard promptly issued statements in support of the KZ Presidium's action. It was done in ignorance of the facts of the case, and in contradiction of the union's own statutes. There were no consultations with the rank-and-file as well. Europe-Asia Studies journal noted, "The case stood as an alarming example of how Solidarity's new activists were instantly ready not only to support each other in any dramatic new initiative but also to believe the worst about one of the First Wave strike leaders. That such a situation would arise concerning Walentynowicz, the very person for whose reinstatement at the Lenin Shipyard was the main point on which the strike originally began, goes beyond mere irony. It demonstrates just how much the movement had changed in under a year, and moreover, just how far apart were the new activists from the old strike leaders-and from the union's rank-and-file." The case against Walentynowicz in the KZ disciplinary commission was led by Jerzy Borowczak, a close associate of Wałęsa. PZPR was also involved in lobbying against Walentynowicz in this affair, with Jan Łabędzki, first Secretary of PZPR inside the Lenin Shipyard announcing publicly that Walentynowicz... destroys the unity of NSZZ Solidarity.

In October 1981, during a meeting with workers in Radom, two officers of the security police—in collaboration with the secret cooperant (TW) Karol—attempted to poison her.

She was acknowledged as the Woman of the Year in the Netherlands.

Martial law was declared in December 1981 and Solidarity was fragmented. The clique around Wałęsa assumed power as a Temporary Coordinating Committee. With western support held on, they abandoned the ideals of 1980.

=== Disagreements with Wałęsa ===
In September 1986, Lech Wałęsa created the first public and legal Solidarity structure since the declaration of martial law, the Temporary Council of NSZZ Solidarity (Tymczasowa Rada NSZZ Solidarność), with Bogdan Borusewicz, Zbigniew Bujak, Władysław Frasyniuk, Tadeusz Jedynak, Bogdan Lis, Janusz Pałubicki, and Józef Pinior. In October 1987, the Country Executive Committee of NSZZ Solidarity (Krajowa Komisja Wykonawcza NSZZ Solidarność) was created by Lech Wałęsa (chairman), Zbigniew Bujak, Jerzy Dłużniewski, Władysław Frasyniuk, Stefan Jurczak, Bogdan Lis, Andrzej Milczanowski, Janusz Pałubicki, Stanisław Węglarz.

Walentynowicz was critical about the development of Solidarity:

This distance between Solidarity and the workers is the major reason for my disagreement with Wałęsa. The Temporary Committee of Solidarity is something new. It is structured too much like the PZPR. They have privileges so the ideas of Solidarity have been dropped. During the seven years since martial law there have been no meetings with workers. They meet amongst themselves, on whose behalf?

In 1986 it was a surprise that such people as Bujak and Borusewicz instead of calling a National Commission nominated themselves. The opposition surprised even the Government. At this moment they broke the statutes. In the fall of 1987 Solidarity members, including myself, during the pilgrimage to Częstochowa sent a petition to Wałęsa to call a National Commission meeting. But Wałęsa wouldn’t accept it. So there have been no meetings, except amongst themselves.

From 14 to 16 December 1981 Walentynowicz was a co-organizer of the strike in the Lenin Shipyard and after its pacification she was detained. On 18 December 1981 she was interned in Bydgoszcz-Fordon and Gołdap and released in July 1982, but was again arrested and held from August 1982 (prisons in Gdańsk, Mokotów and Grudziądz) to March 1983 and from December 1983 to April 1984 (Katowice, Lubliniec, Bytom, Kraków). In total she spent 19 months in jail.

Walentynowicz criticized Wałęsa for taking too much individual credit, and not sufficiently acknowledging that the Solidarity union triumph was a group effort involving millions, saying that his "cult of personality" greatly damaged the movement. It is well documented the Wałęsa-inspired effort to cleanse the informant "Bolek" file during his presidency dealt a serious blow to lustration efforts in Poland. She denounced Wałęsa's conduct in her book Cień przyszłości (The Shadow of the Future) published in Poland in 1993 (the book was published in Germany in 2012 as Solidarność – eine persönliche Geschichte).

French journalist Jean-Marcel Bouguereau, who witnessed the events in Poland in 1980 and was expelled twice, wrote one of the first articles critical about Wałęsa in Libération. Bouguereau's article was titled Walentynowicz "The real heroine of Gdańsk".

She talked about her expectations in an interview in 1985:

We must not wait passively. A free Poland is our aim, but no one will give us that freedom. Our passivity will result in their murdering more and more of us, in more and more people suffering. We must educate, because even when a free Poland is achieved, the nation will be so exhausted that there will be no one to lead it.

== After the fall of Communism ==
While remaining active and outspoken after 1989, Walentynowicz distanced herself from various political parties allied with the new Solidarity. She felt the new Solidarity elites abandoned the workers and ordinary people, not living up to the core Solidarity values of social justice. She felt that Solidarity had been co-opted by self-interested individuals who reneged on their promises. Walentynowicz avoided anniversary celebrations organised by the new Solidarity. In 1995, she wrote an open letter to Wałęsa asking him to respond to seventeen accusations of collaboration and other improprieties. In 2000, she declined honorary citizenship of the city of Gdańsk. During the February 2002 strike at the docks in Gdynia she said:

The 21 demands that we put up in 1980 are still relevant. Nothing was fulfilled. People still have to struggle to be treated with dignity. That's scandalous.

In 2003, she asked for compensation from the government for her 1980s persecution, eventually receiving part of the sum. Walentynowicz mostly donated all which she had to those who needed help. On 15 November 2004, Anna, along with other former strikers of 1980 activists from the first Solidarity and former political prisoners—an open letter prepared by Andrzej Gwiazda to the European Parliament about the development of Solidarity. The European Parliament took note of the open letter in a motion for a resolution in 2005, deploring the fact that the new Solidarity, created in 1989, did not pursue the aims of the first Solidarity.

Walentynowicz was vocal in attacking the perceived misdeeds of the Civic Platform party. On 11 December 2009 she organized the "Poland after XX years 1989–2009" conference in the Sejm.

On 13 December 2005, Walentynowicz accepted the Truman-Reagan Medal of Freedom in Washington on behalf of the first free trade union Solidarity and was personally honored along with John Paul II and General Edward Rowny, Chief US Nuclear Arms Control Negotiator with the Soviets. The columnist Georgie Anne Geyer called her the Rosa Parks of Solidarity and in the column, compared her to the likes of Indira Gandhi and Corazon Aquino. During her visit she met with vice president Linda Chavez Thompson and other leaders of AFL-CIO.

Wer ist Anna Walentynowicz? (transl. Who is Anna Walentynowicz?, directed by Sylke Rene Meyer, 2002, winner of the Sir Peter Ustinov Television Scriptwriting Award), Musimy się na nowo policzyć (transl. We Have to Count Ourselves Anew, directed by Grzegorz W. Tomczak, 2014), Podwójne dno (transl. Double Bottom, directed by Dariusz Małecki, 1994), Anna Proletariuszka (transl. Anna Proletarian, directed by Marek Ciecierski and Sławomir Grunberg, 1980/81) and Robotnicy '80 (transl. Workers '80, 1980) are documentary films in which she is portrayed. Anna Walentynowicz is played by Frances Cox in Leslie Woodhead's docudrama Strike: The Birth of Solidarity (1981). She appeared as herself in Man of Iron (1981), prompting some to call her "woman of iron." She was critical about the Schlöndorff's movie Strike.

== Death ==
Walentynowicz died in a plane crash near Smolensk on 10 April 2010, along with President Lech Kaczyński, First Lady Maria Kaczyńska, and many other prominent Polish leaders, while en route to commemorate the 70th anniversary of the Katyn massacre during World War II. A plaque on her house in Wrzeszcz, a borough of Gdańsk, has recently been dedicated and the city of Gdynia named an intersection after her. Michael Szporer, Professor of Communications at University of Maryland wrote about her: "Her life was very much like Poland's, never nothing, but if you are not afraid to speak up for yourself and care for others, just look what you can become, Pani Ania, a worthier role model than most, because an honest one. Our caring and protective mother!"

Exhumation in 2012 revealed that a different person – Teresa Walewska-Przyjałkowska – was buried in Anna Walentynowicz's grave. Upon the discovery, the bodies were reburied in the correct graves.

In 2015, a trial began over attempted poisoning of Anna Walentynowicz in 1981.

== Remembrance ==
In 2011, a commemorative plaque dedicated to Anna Walentynowicz was unveiled in the city of Gdańsk. It was designed by artist Sławoj Ostrowski.

In 2013, the Anna Walentynowicz Square was ceremonially opened in Wrocław in order to commemorate her role in bringing an end to communism in Poland.

In 2015, a statue of Walentynowicz was unveiled at the Pantheon of National Heroes of the Cemetery of the Fallen at the Battle of Warsaw in Ossów.

In December 2015, the main room (The Column Room) in the Chancellery of the Prime Minister of Poland was named after Anna Walentynowicz.

In 2017, a street in Szczecin was renamed from General Berling to Anna Walentynowicz. A street bearing her name was also established in Lublin.

In 2018, the Sejm passed a resolution establishing 2019 as the "Year of Anna Walentynowicz".

In 2019, Time created 89 new covers to celebrate women of the year starting from 1920; it chose Walentynowicz for 1980.

On 12 October 2020, President of Poland Andrzej Duda officially unveiled a monument dedicated to Walentynowicz in Kyiv, Ukraine, and said that she is "a symbol of the Solidarity movement, a woman who, among all the men who were there at that time, was an element contributing to the female way of thinking about Poland and Polish affairs".

== Quotes ==
From a brochure handed out to workers in Lenin Shipyard on 14 August 1980:

To the workers of the Gdansk Shipyard

We turn to YOU colleagues of Anna Walentynowicz. She has worked at the shipyard since 1950. Sixteen years as a welder, later as crane operator in W-2 section, awarded bronze, silver and in 1979 Gold Cross of Merit (Krzyz zaslugi). She had always been a model worker, what is more, one who reacted to every wrong and injustice.

This has resulted in her activism in independence of management trade union movement. Walentynowicz received a disciplinary notice of firing on 7 August for "major infraction of worker's responsibilities." We would like to remind you that Anna Walentynowicz has only five months to retirement. This matter demonstrates that the administration of the shipyard does not care about public opinion or legal procedure, which it violates forcing people to bend with its whims. Anna Walentynowicz has been a thorn in their side, because she is a model activist devoted to others. She is a thorn in their side because she defends others and is capable of organizing her colleagues... We appeal to you, defend the crane operator Walentynowicz. If you don't, many of you may find themselves in the same miserable situation.

Signed Founding Committee of Independent Trade Unions and the editorial board of THE COASTAL WORKER: Bogdan Borusewicz, Joanna Duda-Gwiazda, Andrzej Gwiazda, Jan Karandziej, Maryla Płońska, Alina Pienkowska, Lech Wałęsa

== Bibliography ==
=== Works currently unavailable in English ===
- The Shadow of the Future (Cień przyszłości) (1993)
