= Alina Pienkowska =

Polish politician (1952–2002)

Senator
- In office 25 November 1991 – 31 May 1993

Personal details
- Born: 12 January 1952 Gdańsk
- Died: 17 October 2002 (aged 50) Gdańsk
- Party: Solidarity

Alina Barbara Pienkowska (12 January 1952 – 17 October 2002; her surname is often misspelt as Pieńkowska) was a Polish free trade union activist and a Senator for Gdańsk (1991–1993, Solidarity Parliamentary Club). She was involved in the creation of Solidarity, of which she was a member of its organizing committee.

== Biography ==
Pienkowska's father worked in the Lenin Shipyard and had joined in the shipyard workers' protest of December 1970. In 1980 she was a young, widowed mother (of a son, Sebastian) working as the shipyard nurse. She had been one of the founders of the underground Free Trade Unions of the Coast in the 1970s.

She wrote health-related articles for the underground journal, The Coastal Worker, mostly related to shipyard safety and rising accident rates. The August 1980 strike started on the 14th over the firing of Anna Walentynowicz. All of the phone lines into the shipyard were cut except to the clinic, and as the nurse, Pienkowska was instrumental in communicating to the outside world about the strike that ultimately spread to the Baltic coast and the giant wave of strikes in Poland. Her first call was to Jacek Kuroń of the Workers' Defence Committee (KOR) in Warsaw. The press described her as a "firebrand", and she herself admitted to being moderated by Kuroń in order to avoid Soviet intervention.

On the third day of the strike, on 16 August 1980, management granted Lenin Shipyard workers their working and pay demands. Lech Wałęsa and others announced the end of the strike. Pienkowska was outraged because of her close connection to the many workers outside the shipyard striking in solidarity with the shipyard workers. She told Wałęsa, "You betrayed them. Now the authorities will crush us like bedbugs."

As workers were beginning to leave, Pienkowska grabbed a loudspeaker and made a passionate speech about the responsibility to keep the strike going to make sure that the other factories which had in the meantime started solidarity strikes with the shipyard would not be left exposed. She and Walentynowicz managed to close the gates, but many workers went home, only to return by the next day (often at the insistence of their wives). The strike was salvaged. Pienkowska was then among the authors of the 21 demands of the Interfactory Strike Committee, 17 August 1980, which led to the Gdańsk Agreement, of which she was a signatory.

Pienkowska secretly married Bogdan Borusewicz during the period of martial law. He spent five years in hiding, visiting her from time to time. While still in hiding, Bogdan, disguised as a woman, attended the baptism of their daughter Kinga. Wałęsa kissed "her" hand as was customary for a Polish male, either to play along with the ruse or because he did not recognize Borusewicz.

Pienkowska worked as the shipyard nurse until 1991, when she was elected Senator for one term. She and her husband later joined the Freedom Union, the party led by post-Communist Poland's first freely elected Prime Minister, Tadeusz Mazowiecki.

In 1998 she became a member of the city council in Gdańsk and was active in local politics and in health issues until the end of her life.

=== Death ===
Pienkowska died on 17 October 2002, aged 50, reportedly from cancer.

On 3 May 2006, she was posthumously awarded the Grand Cross of the Order of Polonia Restituta posthumously at the same ceremony in which Walentynowicz received her posthumous Order of the White Eagle.

Andrzej Wajda said that Pienkowska had been the model for a character in his film Man of Iron, based on events in the shipyard, who speaks her words:

Here in the shipyard I stopped being afraid, stopped running away, and became a real person.

The main character of the 2006 film Strike recreates many of Pienkowska's actions and words.

== References and sources ==
- "We Want a Decent Life", by Stephen Smith, Time, Monday, 29 December 1980.
- Milestones (obituary), Time, Monday, 11 November 2002.
- "Legendary Labor Activist Alina Pienkowska Dies". Human Rights Watch. 24 October 2002. Archived from the original on 20 October 2008.
- Kaufman, Michael T. (28 October 2002). "Alina Pienkowska, a Force Behind Solidarity, Dies at 50". The New York Times.
- Alina Pienkowska, The Times, 30 October 2002.
- Alina Pienkowska, Klub Parlamentarny NSZZ "Solidarność", Senat II kadencji, website of Senate of the Republic of Poland
