= Andrzej Gwiazda =

Polish trade unionist (born 1935)

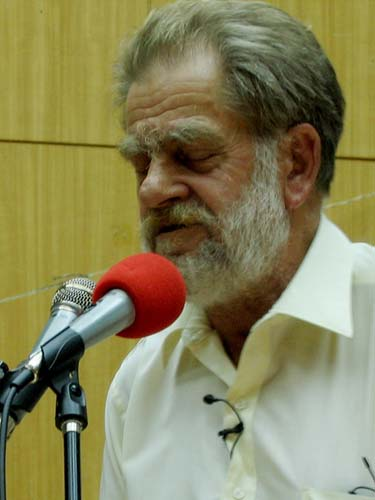
- Gwiazda in 2005
- Born: 14 April 1935 (age 91); Pińczów, Poland
- Education: Gdańsk University of Technology
- Occupation: Trade unionist
- Known for: Founder of the Free Trade Unions of the Coast, vice president of Solidarity
- Spouse: Joanna Duda (m. 1961)

Andrzej Gwiazda (born 14 April 1935) is a Polish trade unionist. A participant in the 1968 and December 1970 protests, he was one of the founders of the Free Trade Unions of the Coast and vice president of Solidarity from 1980 to 1981 before his December 1981 arrest during the martial law period.

== Life and activism ==
Gwiazda's father was a sailor of the Riverine Flotilla of the Polish Navy, stationed in Pińsk (now Belarus), where the family moved in 1939, a few months before the outbreak of World War II. His father Stanisław fought in the Polish September Campaign, as a soldier of Independent Operational Group Polesie. After capitulation of Poland he was caught by the Germans, and spent the war in Oflag II-C in Woldenberg. Young Andrzej, together with mother Zofia (née Zamojska) and grandmother, was in 1940 deported by the Soviets (see Soviet invasion of Poland, Soviet repressions of Polish citizens (1939–1946)) to Kazakhstan, where they stayed until 1946. After the return and reuniting with Stanisław Gwiazda, the family first settled in Upper Silesia, then they moved to Gdańsk, where Andrzej studied electronics at Gdańsk University of Technology, graduating in 1966. After graduation, he worked at Cybernetics Institute of the University, and in 1973 took a job at Power Supplies Factory Elmor in Gdańsk.

Gwiazda married Joanna Duda-Gwiazda in 1961. After marriage, Andrzej and Joanna became more active in anticommunist movements. In 1968, Andrzej was involved in student protests in opposition to the Polish government. In December 1970, he participated in demonstration protesting the dramatic rise in food prices. In 1976, together with his wife, he wrote a letter to the Polish Parliament, in which he expressed support of Workers' Defence Committee. Soon afterwards, the Gwiazdas were officially banned from leaving the People's Republic of Poland, they were also under the surveillance of Służba Bezpieczeństwa. In 1978, Gwiazda was one of the founders of Free Trade Unions of the Coast (WZZ), publishing and delivering "Worker of the Coast", a bulletin of the WZZ. On 16 August 1980, he initiated an industrial action at Elmor. He then became a member of the Inter-Enterprise Strike Committee, and co-authored the 21 demands of MKS. However, he did not sign the Gdańsk Agreement, claiming that the workers, upon advice of their legal experts, agreed for too many concessions to the government. Arrested on 13 December 1981 as after the declaration of martial law, he was transported to a prison camp in Strzebielinek. Later on, Gwiazda was transferred to a jail in Warsaw's Białołęka district. Finally, Gwiazda was released on 22 July 1984, after an amnesty. On 16 December 1984, he was arrested again, after a scuffle with ZOMO officers, and sentenced to five months. After spending time in prisons in Gdańsk and Zabrze, he was released on 15 May 1985.

From 1986 to 1989, Gwiazda was one of leaders of Working Group of National Commission of Solidarity. The group was opposed to any forms of negotiations with Communist authorities. Unlike Lech Wałęsa, Gwiazda did not participate in creation of the Solidarity Citizens' Committee, nor in the negotiations of Polish Round Table Talks. He remains a firm skeptic about Wałęsa, saying that "from the beginning of the strike at the Gdańsk Shipyard, he was acting to the detriment of Solidarity". Also, he says that Wałęsa should never have been made "a symbol of Poland".

== Bibliography ==
=== Works currently unavailable in English ===
- Outside the System (Poza układem) (2008)

==== Further reading ====
- Gwiazda, You were Right (Gwiazda miałeś rację) (Interviews with Andrzej Gwiazda by Wiesława Kwiatkowska, 1990)
- Constellation in „Solidarity" (Gwiazdozbiór w „Solidarności") (Interviews with Joanna and Andrzej Gwiazda by Remigiusz Okraska, 2009)
