= Lech Wałęsa's pen =

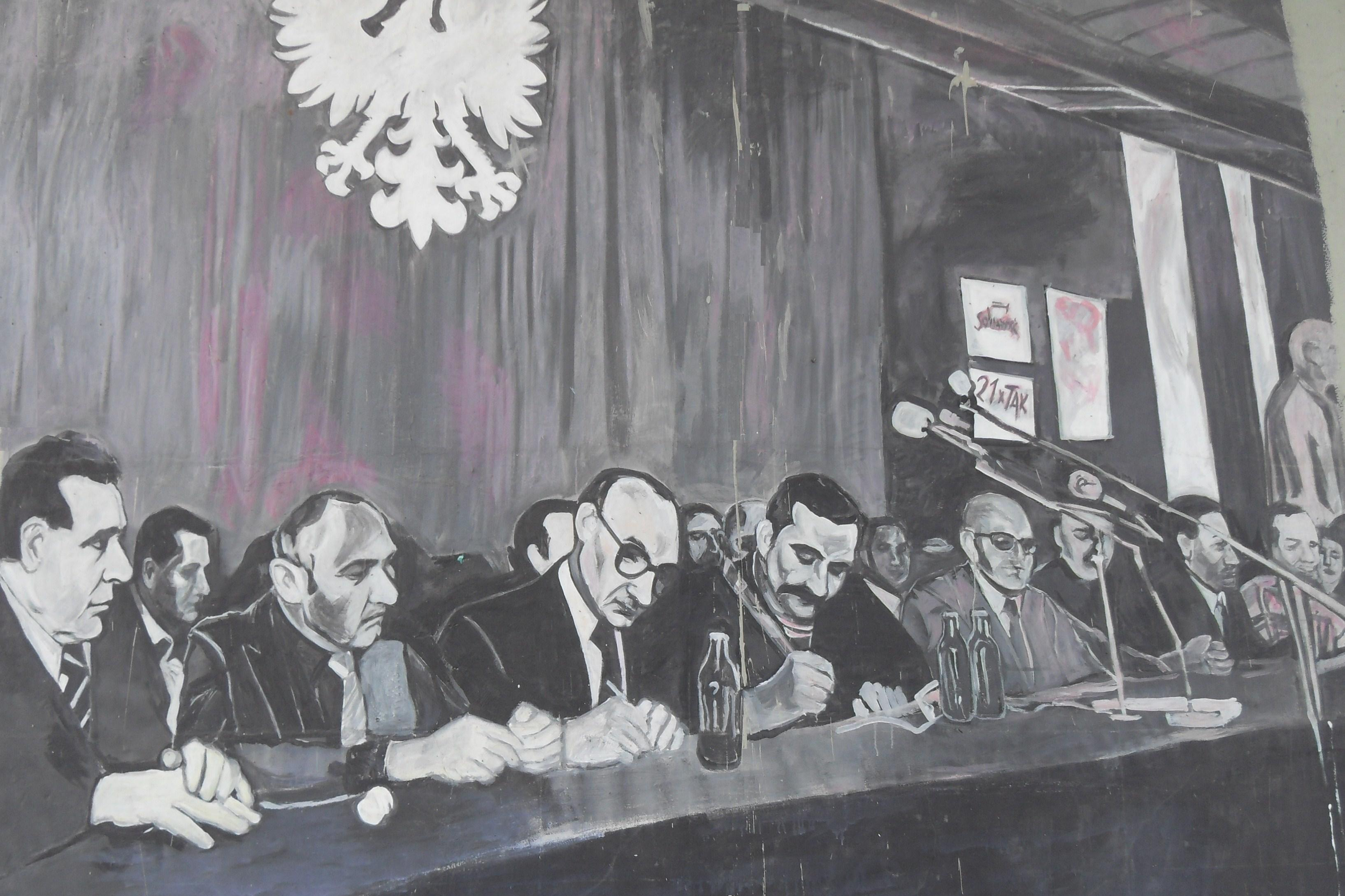
Graffiti of the signing of the August Agreements. Lech Wałęsa is visible with the pen.

Lech Wałęsa's pen is a large plastic red ballpoint pen, 40 cm in length (sometimes speculated to be 48 cm), with the top part being a transparent capsule with a rolled-up postcard depicting Pope John Paul II. The end has a small silver chain to hang it. It is well known to have been used by Lech Wałęsa to sign the Gdańsk Agreement. The original pen is currently on permanent display in the 600 Years Museum at Jasna Góra Monastery in Częstochowa, in a room of the former printing works.

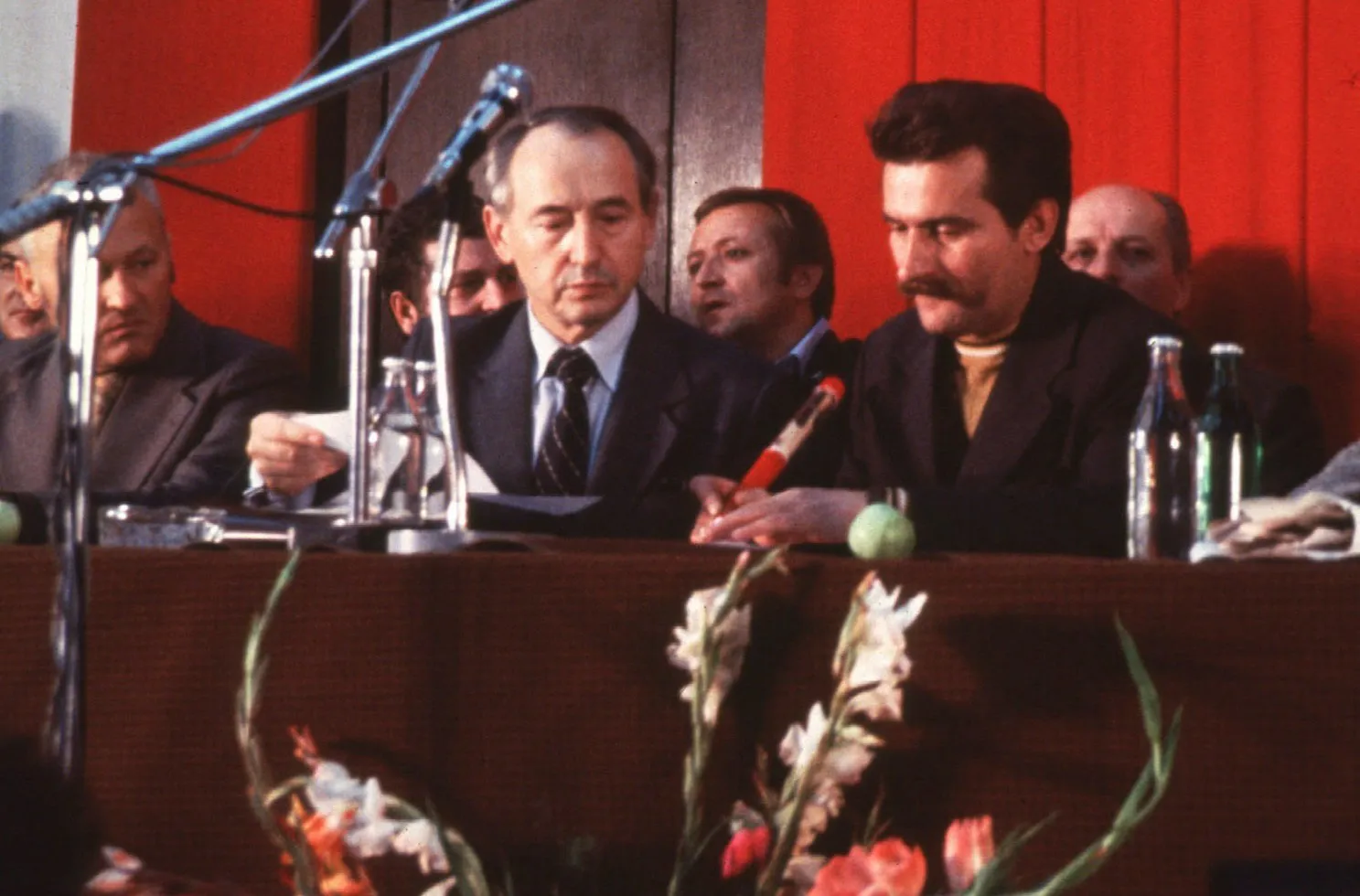
Wałęsa and Jagielski signing the agreement on 31 August 1980

== History ==
Large pens with the Pope's image have been mass-produced by Ludwik Górka of Myślenice since shortly after Karol Wojtyła's election as Pope. His business, founded in 1960, was manufacturing stationery, often with other religious and vacation images. The product was distributed mainly at popular pilgrimage sites (Jasna Góra, Niepokalanów, St. Anne Mountain). One of those pens was gifted to Lech Wałęsa in August 1980 at the Gdańsk Shipyard, during the strikes. While not directly confirmed, it is speculated that the giver was a witness or participant of the events, possibly having been a participant of a pilgrimage from Gdańsk to Częstochowa.

Lech Wałęsa used this pen on August 31, 1980, at 16:45 to sign the Gdańsk Agreement, which was photographed and recorded, and the video was published through television networks across the world. In 1983, the owner donated the pen and the Nobel Peace Prize medal and diploma to the Jasna Góra sanctuary. The Pauline Fathers of Jasna Góra have in the following decades donated the pen to various historical and patriotic exhibitions.

== Role and meaning ==
Lech Wałęsa's pen is a mass-produced product. It was present in many Polish homes in the 1970s and 1980s. Copies were produced for both the first edition and later editions, the latter of which were made e.g. when Pope John Paul II made more pastoral visits to Poland.

In ethnological reflection, the product debuted in Sztuka á vista. Folklor strajkowy (Art á vista. Strike folklore) by Czesław Robotycki. The work was published in 1990 in Polska Sztuka Ludowa, but was written in 1981. According to Robotycki, the strike's atmosphere created a "mosaic of pathos and the people's indulgence," and the signing of the agreement with a "low-quality pen" was in good faith, but was simultaneously an oblivious breach of conventions, an "example of carnival (ambivalent) strike aesthetic."

Piotr Trzaskalski stated that the pen was initially a funny symbol to him, not something pompous and out of the ordinary. He thought that Wałęsa is a "man with a specific sense of humor if he used such a trashy item to sign important documents instead of an elegant fountain pen". Bogdan Borusewicz judged the pen as a "circus antic". Zbigniew Bujak considered the pen to be a "pretentious oddity", but defended it in front of his friends, saying it was a "foolish antic". The Pope's image was then an element that united and integrated the opposition.

Ethnologist Damian Kasprzyk pointed out that Wałęsa's pen was a sign that distinguished the striking side from the government side (Mieczysław Jagielski signed the agreement with a standard pen or fountain pen, which did not make history.) Wałęsa used a differentiating object, issued a "manifesto of proletariat familiarity against the party's nomenklatura foreignness." He additionally used an artifact created by the conservative private sector. The pen fit the image of Mother of God that Wałęsa wore in the lapel of his jacket. He has manifested the religiousness of both the one signing and all the strikers, the whole societal movement. Mieczysław Rakowski pointed it out in his text from 1 September 1980 Wałęsa, z portretem papieża i plakietką Matki Boskiej w klapie, podpisał porozumienie wielgachnym długopisem (Wałęsa, with the Pope's portrait and a plaque of Mother of God in the lapel, signed the agreement with an enormous pen). The pen was in this context a material component of a ritualized, semiotical gesture: a symbol of victory. When Wałęsa triumphantly lifted his arms after signing the agreement, the pen was branded a trophy and took on that role.

To this day, it is unknown if Wałęsa used the pen intentionally. He himself provided two somewhat incoherent statements about it:

When we had to go sign the documents, I thought to myself: now that I have such a pen, shouldn't I use it to sign the agreement? While it is true that the pen was large and uncomfortable, it had the Holy Father's image... No calculations from my side. I signed with this pen by accident, so I didn't understand those who immediately made an uproar that Wałęsa is fooling around with the pen.

It was an accident at the peak of the events, someone gifted me this pen, I don't even know who. When came the time to sign, I had it and just used it (...) The pen had the Holy Father's image, who united us, gave us the strength and faith to change the face of this land and therefore fit the situation the best.

== Sales ==
Jan Górka, the son of the pen's manufacturer, has pointed out that his family has become financially successful while the private sector had no possibility to advertise their products. Hundreds of units were manufactured on manual machines every day, and the price of one has reached that of the black market United States dollar (120 Polish złotys at the time). The family's success was the subject of a 9-minute film étude Długopis (Pen) by Piotr Trzaskalski filmed for the 25th anniversary of Solidarity.

Today, replicas of Wałęsa's copy, 38 cm in length, can be purchased at European Solidarity Centre in Gdańsk, among others.
