= Lech Kaczyński =

President of Poland from 2005 to 2010

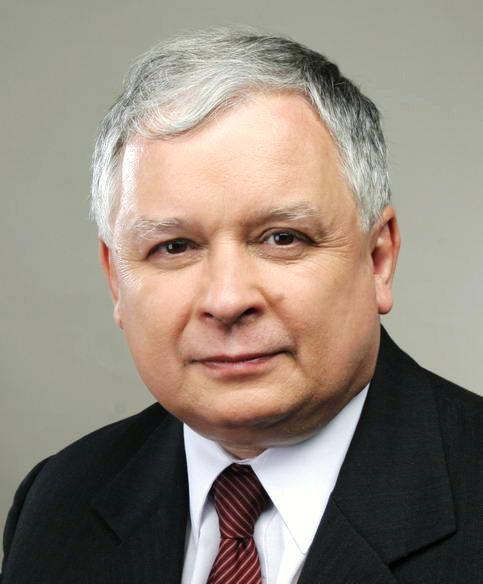
- Official portrait, 2006

President of Poland
- In office 23 December 2005 – 10 April 2010
- Prime Minister: Kazimierz Marcinkiewicz; Jarosław Kaczyński; Donald Tusk
- Preceded by: Aleksander Kwaśniewski
- Succeeded by: Bronisław Komorowski (acting)

President of the Supreme Audit Office
- In office 14 February 1992 – 8 June 1995
- President: Lech Wałęsa
- Prime Minister: Jan Olszewski; Waldemar Pawlak; Hanna Suchocka; Waldemar Pawlak; Józef Oleksy
- Preceded by: Walerian Pańko
- Succeeded by: Janusz Wojciechowski

Mayor of Warsaw
- In office 18 November 2002 – 22 December 2005
- Deputy: Mirosław Kochalski; Dorota Safjan; Sławomir Skrzypek; Władysław Stasiak; Andrzej Urbański
- Preceded by: Wojciech Kozak
- Succeeded by: Mirosław Kochalski

Leader of Law and Justice
- In office 13 June 2001 – 18 January 2003
- Parliamentary Leader: Kazimierz Marcinkiewicz; Jarosław Kaczyński; Ludwik Dorn
- Preceded by: Position established
- Succeeded by: Jarosław Kaczyński

Minister of Justice Public Prosecutor General
- In office 12 June 2000 – 4 July 2001
- Prime Minister: Jerzy Buzek
- Preceded by: Hanna Suchocka
- Succeeded by: Stanisław Iwanicki

Member of the Sejm
- In office 25 November 1991 – 14 October 1993
- In office 19 October 2001 – 18 November 2002

Personal details
- Born: Lech Aleksander Kaczyński; 18 June 1949 Warsaw, Poland
- Died: 10 April 2010 (aged 60) Smolensk, Russia
- Cause of death: Aircraft crash
- Resting place: Wawel Cathedral, Kraków, Poland
- Party: Independent (2005–2010)
- Other political affiliations: Solidarity (before 1991); Centre Agreement (1991–1997); Solidarity Electoral Action (1997–2001); Law and Justice (2001–2005)
- Spouse: Maria Mackiewicz (m. 1978)
- Children: 1
- Relatives: Jarosław Kaczyński (twin brother)
- Education: University of Warsaw; University of Gdańsk (PhD)
- Awards: Order of the White Eagle Order of the Polonia Restituta Chain of the Order of King Abdulaziz (Saudi Arabia) Order of Malta Order of the White Lion Grand Order of King Tomisław National Hero of Georgia Order of Victory Saint George (Georgia) Order of Vytautas the Great - Grand Cross National Order of Merit Order of Prince Henry - Grand Collar Order of the Star of Romania - Grand Cross Order of the Double White Cross Order of Prince Jarosław the Wise Order of Merit of Hungary - Grand Cross

Lech Aleksander Kaczyński (Polish: [ˈlɛx alɛkˈsandɛr kaˈt͡ʂɘ̟ɲ.skʲi]; 18 June 1949 – 10 April 2010) was a Polish politician who served as the 4th president of Poland from 2005 to 2010, when he died in the Smolensk air disaster. Earlier, he served as the city mayor of Warsaw from 2002 to 2005. Prior to these tenures, Kaczyński served as President of the Supreme Audit Office from 1992 to 1995 and later Minister of Justice and Public Prosecutor General in Jerzy Buzek's cabinet from 2000 until his dismissal in July 2001.

Born in Warsaw, he starred in a 1962 Polish film, The Two Who Stole the Moon, with his identical twin brother Jarosław. Kaczyński was a graduate of law and administration of Warsaw University. In 1980, he was awarded his PhD by Gdańsk University. In 1990, he completed his habilitation in labour and employment law. He later assumed professorial positions at Gdańsk University and Cardinal Stefan Wyszyński University in Warsaw. During the communist period, Kaczyński was an activist in the pro-democratic anti-communist movement in Poland, the Workers' Defence Committee, as well as the Independent Trade Union movement. In August 1980, he became an adviser to the Inter-Enterprise Strike Committee in the Gdańsk Shipyard and the Solidarity movement. After the communists imposed martial law in December 1981, he was interned as an "anti-socialist element." After his release, he returned to trade union activities, becoming a member of the underground Solidarity. When Solidarity was legalised again in the late 1980s, Kaczyński was an active adviser to Lech Wałęsa and his Solidarity Citizens' Committee in 1988. From February to April 1989, he participated in the Polish Round Table Talks along with his brother.

After Solidarity's victory in the 1989 Polish legislative election, Kaczyński became a senator and vice-chairman of the movement. Then in the 1991 Polish parliamentary election, he was elected into the Sejm as a non-party member. He was also the main adviser and supporter of Lech Wałęsa when the latter was elected President of Poland in December 1990. Wałęsa nominated Kaczyński to be the Security Minister in the Presidential Chancellery but fired him in 1992 due to a conflict concerning Jan Olszewski's government. In 2001, Kaczyński co-founded the Law and Justice party, after splitting from the Solidarity Electoral Action and the Christian National Union, along with his brother. Kaczyński was the party's presidential candidate, during the 2005 Polish presidential election. In the first round of voting, Kaczyński received 33.1% of the valid votes. In the second round of voting, Kaczyński received 54.04% of the vote, defeating Donald Tusk, who received 45.96% of the vote. He was sworn in as president on 23 December 2005. On 10 July 2006, Kaczyński appointed his brother as Prime Minister of Poland upon the resignation of Kazimierz Marcinkiewicz, the brothers then became the first pair of brothers in the world to serve as president and Prime Minister of a country and the only twin brothers to do so, until 2007, when his brother lost the parliamentary election on 21 October 2007, finishing a distant second behind the conservative-liberal party Civic Platform. His brother was succeeded as prime minister by his former presidential rival Donald Tusk.

On 10 April 2010, Lech Kaczyński died, along with his wife, in the crash of a Polish Air Force jet that occurred on a landing attempt at Smolensk North Airport in Russia. The aircraft carrying him and some senior Polish officials had crashed while they were travelling to attend ceremonies marking the 70th anniversary of the Katyn massacre. He was the first Polish president to die in office since the assassination of Gabriel Narutowicz.

== Early life ==
Kaczyński was born in Warsaw, the son of Rajmund (an engineer who served as a soldier of the Armia Krajowa in World War II and a veteran of the Warsaw Uprising), and Jadwiga (a philologist at the Polish Academy of Sciences). As a child, he starred in a 1962 Polish film, The Two Who Stole the Moon (Polish title O dwóch takich, co ukradli księżyc), with his identical twin brother Jarosław.

Kaczyński was a graduate of law and administration of Warsaw University. In 1980, he was awarded his PhD by Gdańsk University. In 1990, he completed his habilitation in labour and employment law. He later assumed professorial positions at Gdańsk University and Cardinal Stefan Wyszyński University in Warsaw.

== Opposition to communism ==
In the 1970s, Kaczyński was an activist in the pro-democratic anti-communist movement in Poland, the Workers' Defence Committee, as well as the Independent Trade Union movement. In August 1980, he became an adviser to the Inter-Enterprise Strike Committee in the Gdańsk Shipyard and the Solidarity movement. After the communists imposed martial law in December 1981, he was interned as an anti-socialist element. After his release, he returned to trade union activities, becoming a member of the underground Solidarity.

When Solidarity was legalised again in the late 1980s, Kaczyński was an active adviser to Lech Wałęsa and his Komitet Obywatelski Solidarność in 1988. From February to April 1989, he participated in the Round Table talks.

== Political activity from 1989 to 2005 ==
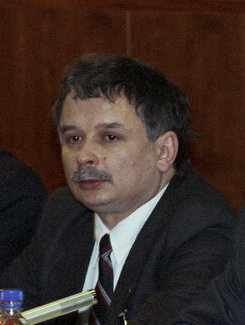
Kaczyński in 1991

Kaczyński was elected senator in the elections of June 1989 and became the vice-chairman of the Solidarity trade union. In the 1991 parliamentary election, he was elected to the parliament as a non-party member. He was, however, supported by the electoral committee Centre Civic Alliance, closely related but not identical to the political party Centre Agreement (Porozumienie Centrum) led by his brother. He was also the main adviser and supporter of Lech Wałęsa when the latter was elected President of Poland in December 1990. Wałęsa nominated Kaczyński to be the Security Minister in the Presidential Chancellery but fired him in 1992 due to a conflict concerning Jan Olszewski's government.

Kaczyński was the President of the Supreme Chamber of Control (Najwyższa Izba Kontroli, NIK) from February 1992 to May 1995 and later Minister of Justice and Attorney General in Jerzy Buzek's government from June 2000 until his dismissal in July 2001. During this time, he was very popular because of his strong stance against corruption.

=== Law and Justice ===
In 2001, he founded the political party Law and Justice (Prawo i Sprawiedliwość – PiS), usually labelled "conservative" by the media, with his brother Jarosław. Lech Kaczyński was the president of the party between 2001 and 2003.

=== Mayor of Warsaw ===
In 2002, Kaczyński was elected mayor of Warsaw in a landslide victory. He started his term in office by declaring war on corruption. He strongly supported the construction of the Warsaw Uprising Museum and in 2004 appointed a historical panel to estimate material losses that were inflicted upon the city by the Germans in the Second World War (an estimated 85% of the city was destroyed in the Warsaw Uprising) as a direct response to heightened claims coming from German expellees from Poland. The panel estimated the losses to be at least 45.3 billion euros ($54 billion) in current value. He also supported the construction of the Museum of the History of Polish Jews in Warsaw and was one of the signatories of the agreement to finance the project using the city's funds.

==== Interference with LGBT events ====
Kaczyński banned the Warsaw gay pride parade twice in 2004 and again in 2005, locally known as the Parada Równości (the Equality Parade), telling protesters that "I respect your right to demonstrate as citizens, but not as homosexuals." Additionally, he feared the parade would promote a "homosexual lifestyle" and complained that police did not use enough force in breaking it up by stating "Why was force not used to break up an illegal demonstration?". Kaczyński referred to the organizers of the gay pride parades as "perverts".

In 2005, Kaczyński allowed a counter-demonstration, the "Parade of Normality", organised by the All-Polish Youth, a Catholic nationalist organisation opposed to "liberalism, tolerance, and relativism."

In 2007, Poland was found guilty by the European Court of Human Rights of violating the principle of freedom of assembly by banning the 2005 Parada Równości under Article 11 of the European Convention on Human Rights.

== Presidency 2005–2010 ==
=== Presidential election ===
On 19 March 2005, he formally declared his intention to run for president in the October 2005 election. In the first round of the elections, he polled 33% of the vote, taking second place behind Donald Tusk. By the second round, however, he had gained the support of Radio Maryja, as well as of two other political parties besides his own: Self-Defence of the Republic of Poland, and the Polish People's Party.

Elected President of the Republic of Poland (he defeated the runner-up Donald Tusk by polling 8,257,468 votes, constituting 54.04% of the vote), Kaczyński assumed office on 23 December 2005, taking an oath before the National Assembly.

=== Domestic policy ===
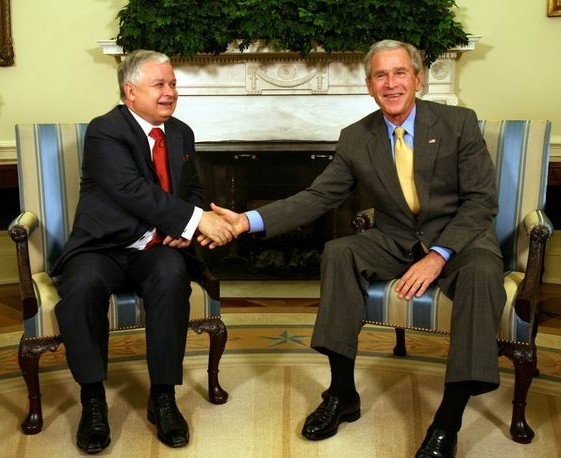
Lech Kaczyński with U.S. President George W. Bush in 2007

In his first public speech as president-elect, Kaczyński said that his presidency would pursue the task of ameliorating the Republic, a process which he said would consist of "purging various pathologies from our life, most prominently crime [...], particularly criminal corruption – that entire, great rush to obtain unjust enrichment, a rush that is poisoning society, [and preventing the state from ensuring] elementary social security, health security, basic conditions for the development of the family [and] the security of commerce and the basic conditions for economic development."

During his inauguration, he stated several goals he would pursue during his presidency. Among those concerning internal affairs were: increasing social solidarity in Poland, bringing justice to those who were responsible for, or were affected by, communist crimes in the People's Republic of Poland, fighting corruption, providing security in the economy, and ensuring the safety of the development of the family. Kaczyński also stated that he would seek to abolish economic inequalities between various regions of Poland. In his speech, he also emphasised combining modernisation with tradition and remembering the teachings of Pope John Paul II.

On 21 December 2008, Kaczyński became the first Polish head of state to visit a Polish synagogue and to attend religious services held there. His attendance coincided with the first night of Hanukkah.

Kaczyński supported the reintroducing the death penalty in Poland, clashing with the European Union over the issue in 2006.

=== Presidential pardons ===
From 2005 to 2007, in accordance with article 133 of the Constitution of the Republic of Poland, Kaczyński pardoned 77 people and declined to pardon 550.

=== Foreign affairs ===
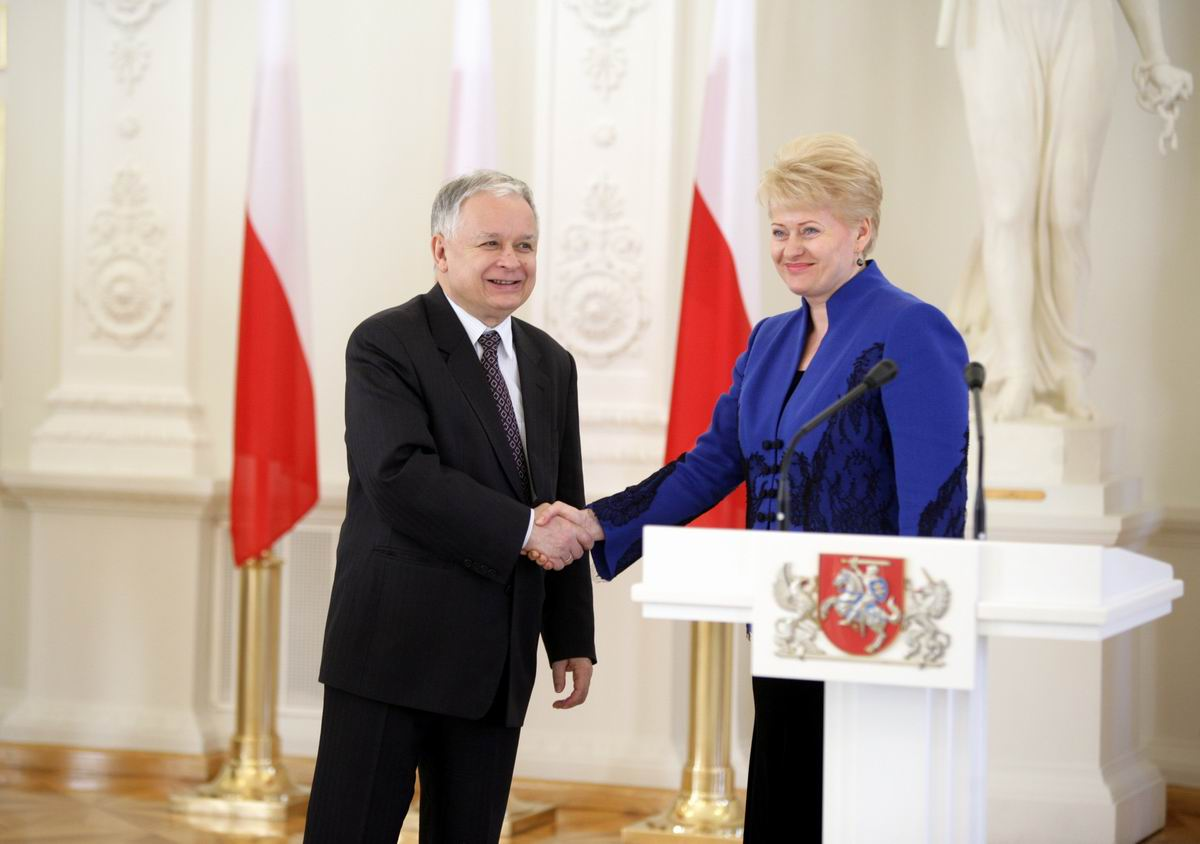
Meeting with his Lithuanian counterpart, Dalia Grybauskaitė, in Vilnius at the Presidential Palace, 8 April 2010. This was to be Kaczyński's last meeting with a fellow head of state.

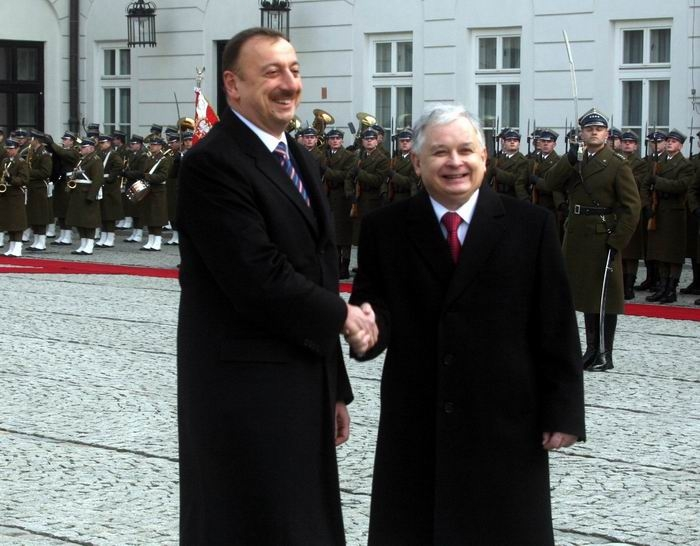
Lech Kaczyński and president of Azerbaijan Ilham Aliyev, 2008

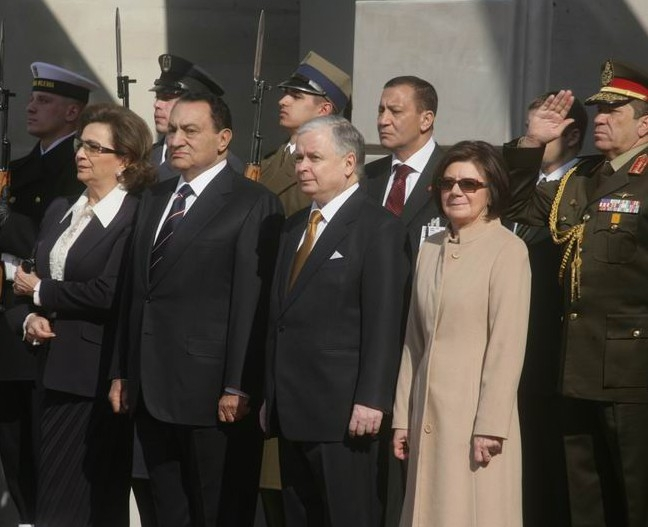
Lech Kaczyński and president of Egypt Hosni Mubarak, 2008

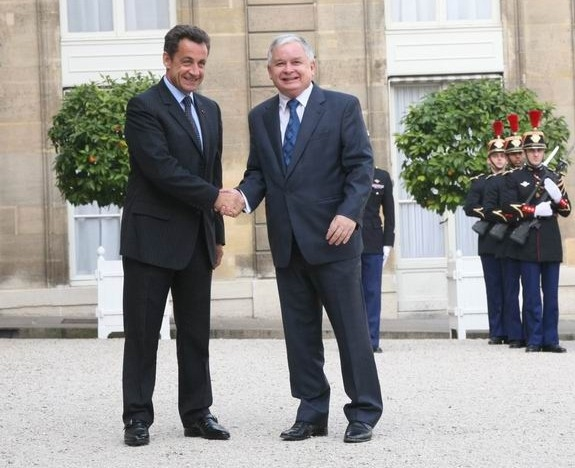
Kaczyński with French President Nicolas Sarkozy in Paris, 8 October 2007

In foreign policy, Kaczyński noted that many of Poland's problems were related to the lack of energy security and this issue would have to be resolved to protect Polish interests. Strengthening ties with the United States while continuing to develop relations within the European Union are two main goals of Polish foreign affairs, as well as improving relations with France and Germany despite several problems in relations with the latter. Aside from those issues, his immediate goals were to develop a tangible strategic partnership with Ukraine and greater co-operation with the Baltic states, Azerbaijan and Georgia.

He was greatly admired in Israel because he promoted educating Polish youth about the Holocaust. There was widespread grief in Israel over his death.

Defence Minister Radosław Sikorski compared the planned Russia to Germany gas pipeline to the Ribbentrop-Molotov Pact and Foreign Minister Anna Fotyga stated that the pipeline was a threat to Poland's energy security.

In November 2006 in Helsinki, at a European Union-Russia meeting, Poland vetoed the launch of EU-Russia partnership talks due to a Russian ban on Polish meat and plant products imports.

As a reaction to claims by a German exile group Preussische Treuhand, which represents post-1945 German expellees from Eastern Europe, the Polish Foreign Minister Fotyga mistakenly threatened to reopen a 1990 Treaty fixing the Oder and Neisse rivers as the border between the two countries instead of the Neighbourhood Treaty signed in the same year.

Following the military conflict between Russia and Georgia in 2008, Kaczyński provided the website of the President of Poland for the dissemination of information blocked by the Russian Federation on Georgian internet portals. In a speech during the Russian aggression against Georgia, Kaczyński predicted: "Today Georgia, tomorrow Ukraine, the Baltic States the day after tomorrow, and then perhaps the time will come for my country, Poland!"

During a state visit to Serbia in 2009, Kaczyński said that the Polish government, on the basis of its constitutional competences, decided to recognise Kosovo and emphasised that he, as the President of the state, did not agree with that.

== Marriage and family ==
Kaczyński married economist Maria Kaczyńska in 1978. They had one daughter, Marta Kaczyńska-Dubieniecka. His brother is Jarosław Kaczyński, the former Prime Minister of Poland.

== Death ==
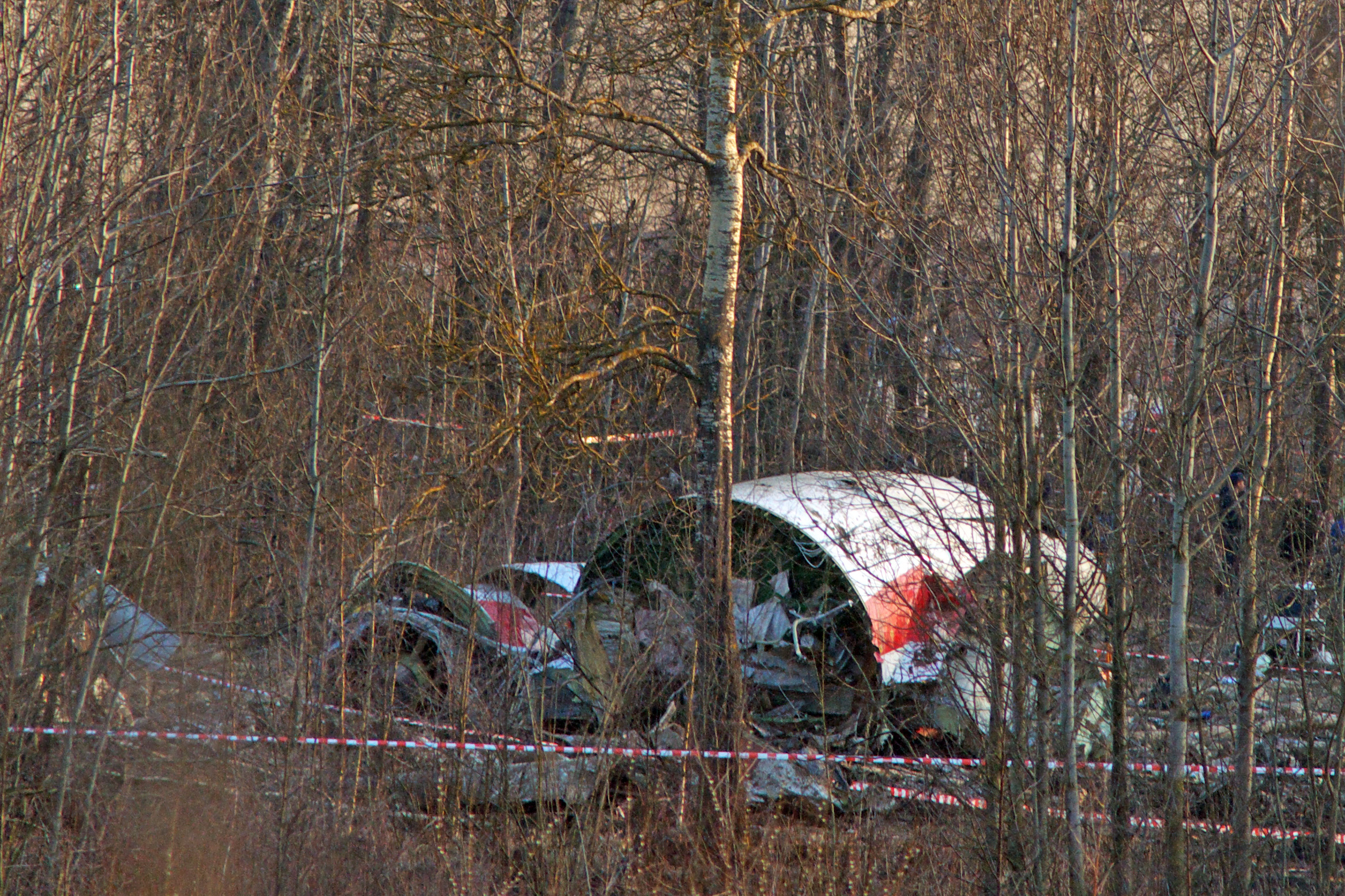
The wreckage of the Tu-154 at the scene of the crash

On 10 April 2010, Polish Air Force Flight 101, a Tupolev Tu-154M plane, was carrying Lech Kaczyński, his wife Maria Kaczyńska, and other members of a Polish delegation (top public and military figures) from Warsaw to commemorate the Katyn massacre. The plane crashed while approaching Smolensk Air Base in Russia. The governor of Smolensk Oblast confirmed to the Russia 24 news channel that there were no survivors. 96 people were killed in the crash, including many of Poland's highest military and civilian leaders.

Russian President Dmitry Medvedev ordered a government commission to investigate the crash. Russia's Prime Minister, Vladimir Putin, was placed in charge of the investigation.

Russian politician Valeriya Novodvorskaya later claimed the Russian government had murdered Kaczyński.

=== State funeral ===
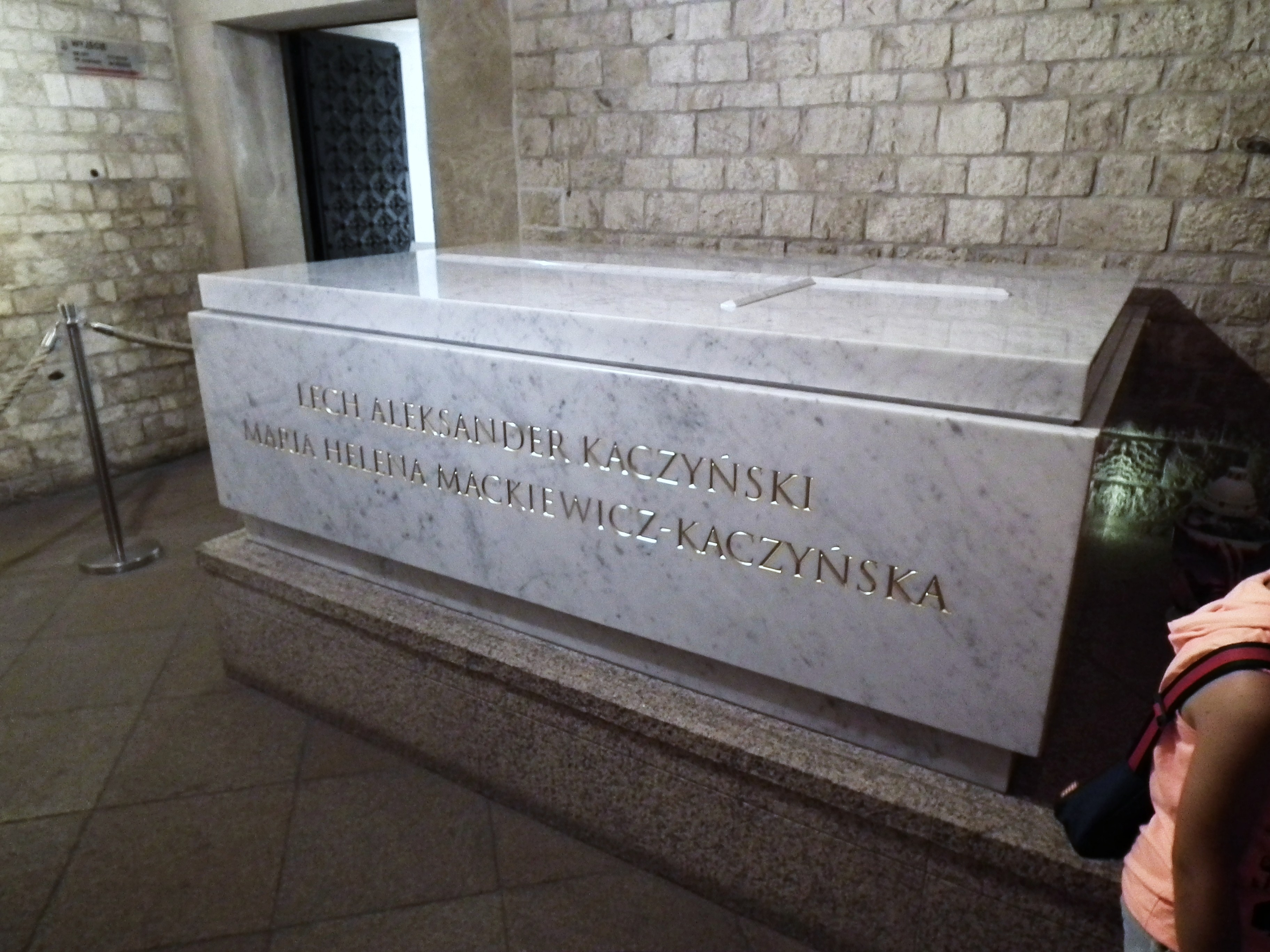
Sarcophagus of Lech and Maria in the Crypt Under the Tower of Silver Bells, Kraków

On 11 April 2010, President Kaczyński's body was returned to Poland, where he and his wife lay in state at the Presidential Palace in Warsaw. The state funeral was held in Kraków on 18 April 2010. After a Roman Catholic Mass at St. Mary's Basilica, the presidential couple were laid to rest in a coffin, which was placed in the antechamber of the Crypt Under the Tower of Silver Bells beneath the Wawel Cathedral. A significant number of foreign dignitaries were unable to attend the funeral as a result of air travel disruption in Europe following the eruption of the Eyjafjallajökull volcano in Iceland.

=== Exhumation and post-mortem ===
In June 2016, the Polish government announced it would re-open the investigation into the Smolensk jet crash with plans to exhume and autopsy on all 96 of the victims. On 14 November 2016, the first of ten bodies, including Kaczyński's, were exhumed. Kaczyński and his wife were reburied on 18 November 2016 after autopsies.

By 1 June 2017, exhumations of 27 coffins had been completed and DNA tests confirmed that 24 of those coffins, Kaczyński's among them, showed evidence of mix-ups, including switched bodies, partial sets of remains and multiple remains in one grave.

== Honours and awards ==
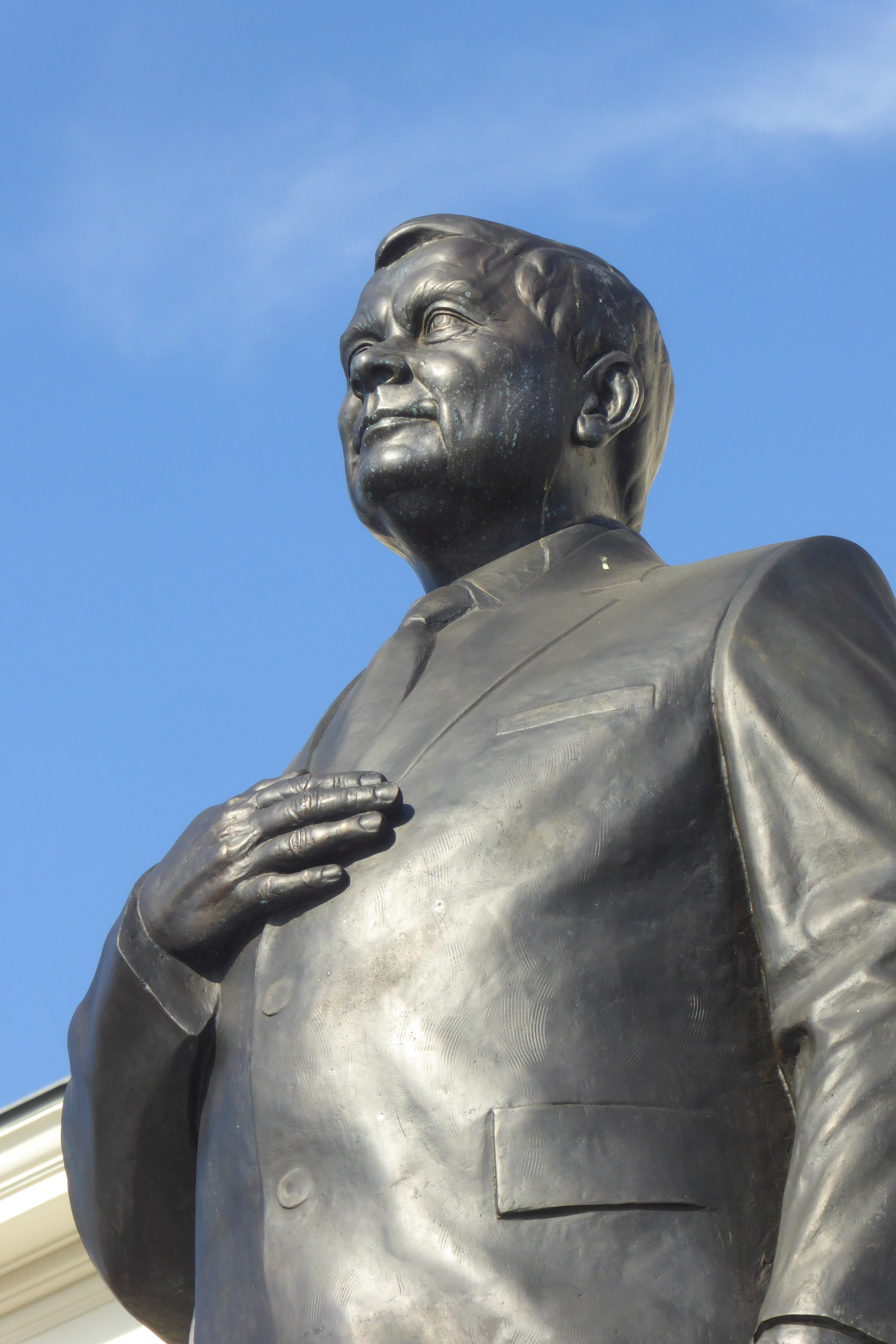
The statue of Lech Kaczyński in Piłsudski Square, Warsaw

=== National honours ===
- Poland:
  - Knight of the Order of the White Eagle
  - Grand Cross of the Order of Polonia Restituta

=== Foreign honours ===
- Azerbaijan:
  - Recipient of the Heydar Aliyev Order (2 July 2009)
- Croatia:
  - Grand Cross of the Grand Order of King Tomislav (10 January 2008)
- Czech Republic:
  - Member 1st Class of the Order of the White Lion (21 January 2010)
- Georgia:
  - Recipient of the Order of National Hero of Georgia (posthumously, 10 April 2010)
  - Recipient of the St. George's Order of Victory (23 November 2007)
- Hungary:
  - Grand Cross of the Order of Merit of the Republic of Hungary (18 March 2009)
- Lithuania:
  - Commander Grand Cross with Golden Chain of the Order of Vytautas the Great (16 April 2009)
- Sovereign Military Order of Malta:
  - Collar of the Order pro Merito Melitensi (26 February 2009)
  - Grand Cross Special Class of the Order pro Merito Melitensi (14 May 2007)
- Portugal:
  - Grand Collar of the Order of Prince Henry (2 September 2008)
- Romania:
  - Collar of the Order of the Star of Romania (7 October 2009)
- Saudi Arabia:
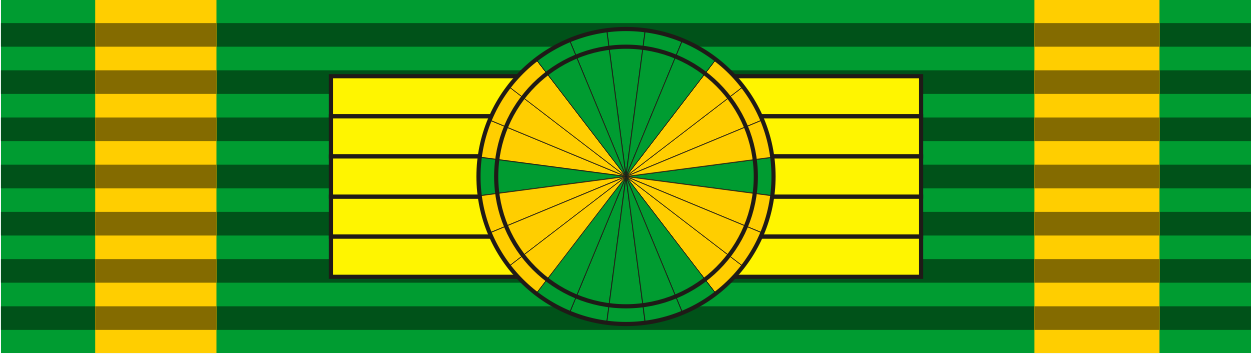
  - Collar of the Order of Abdulaziz al Saud (25 June 2007)
- Slovakia:
  - Member 1st Class of the Order of the White Double Cross (21 February 2009)
- Ukraine:
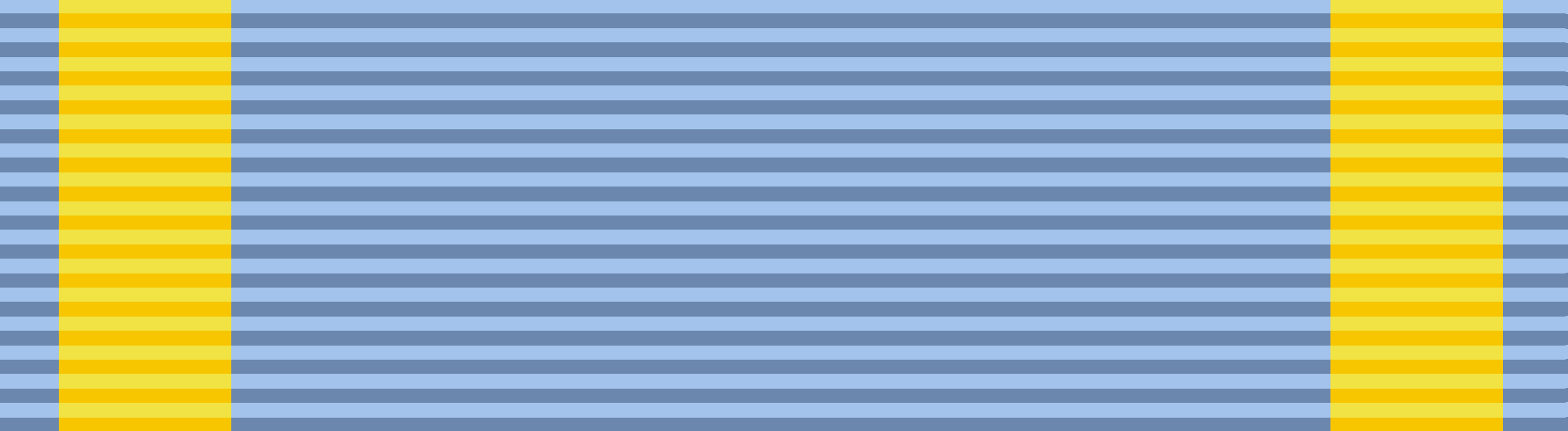
  - Member 1st Class of the Order of Prince Yaroslav the Wise (6 December 2007)

=== Other achievements ===
- Georgia: Honorary doctorate from the Tbilisi State University in Georgia (16 April 2007)
- South Korea: Honorary doctorate from Hankuk University of Foreign Studies in Seoul (6 December 2008)
- Poland: Honorary doctorate from Catholic University of Lublin (1 July 2009)
- Poland: Honorary citizen of Warsaw (15 April 2010)

Legal offices
| Preceded by Walerian Pańko | President of the Supreme Audit Office; 1992 – 1995 | Succeeded by Janusz Wojciechowski |
Political offices
| Preceded by Hanna Suchocka | Minister of Justice; 2000 – 2001 | Succeeded by Stanisław Iwanicki |
| Preceded by Wojciech Kozak | Mayor of Warsaw; 2002 – 2005 | Succeeded by Mirosław Kochalski; Acting |
| Preceded by Aleksander Kwaśniewski | President of Poland; 2005 – 2010 | Succeeded by Bronisław Komorowski; Acting |
Party political offices
| New political party | Leader of Law and Justice; 2001 – 2003 | Succeeded by Jarosław Kaczyński |
