= 21 Demands (disambiguation) =

The Twenty-One Demands were a set of demands made by Japan to China in 1915.

21 Demands may also refer to:

- 21 Demands (band), a previous name of the Irish band Kodaline
- 21 demands of MKS, a list of demands issued by the Polish Inter-Enterprise Strike Committee in 1980
