= Democratic and Social Movement =

Democratic and Social Movement can refer to:

- Democratic and Social Movement (Algeria)
- Democratic Social Movement, a political party in Greece
- Democratic and Social Movement (Morocco)
- Democratic-Social Movement (Poland)
