= August Agreements =

1980 Polish government accord with strikers

The August Agreements (Polish: Porozumienia sierpniowe) was a set of four accords reached between the government of the Polish People's Republic and the striking shipyard workers in Poland following the 1980 Polish strikes. The accord, signed in late August 1980 by government representative Mieczysław Jagielski and strike leader Lech Wałęsa, led to the creation of the trade union Solidarity and was an important milestone towards the eventual end of Communist rule in Poland.

In summer 1980, faced with a major economic crisis, the Polish government authorized a rise in food prices, which immediately led to a wave of strikes and factory occupations across the country. On 14 August workers at the Lenin Shipyard in Gdańsk went on strike after the sacking of Anna Walentynowicz, five months before she was to retire. The Inter-Enterprise Strike Committee, headed by Wałęsa, issued a list of 21 demands to the government. With popular support within the country, the workers held out until the government gave in to their demands, and an agreement was formalized on 31 August.

In the aftermath of the strike, Solidarity emerged as an independent trade union and rapidly grew, ultimately claiming over 10 million members nationwide and establishing itself as a major force in Polish politics. First Secretary Edward Gierek was removed from power and replaced by Stanisław Kania.

== Background ==
The labor strikes did not occur because of problems that emerged shortly before the unrest, but because of political and economic difficulties over the previous ten years. Under the rule of Władysław Gomułka in the late 1960s, Poland's economy was in disarray. To counter this, the government increased food prices just before Christmas 1970, which caused widespread discontent across the nation.

On 14 December 1970 workers from the Lenin shipyard in Gdańsk began a strike against the party headquarters in the city, demanding the formation of independent trade unions. During the unrest, 75 people were killed after Gomułka ordered that the revolt be put down with force. As R. J. Crampton wrote: "The Kremlin did not agree and intervened to urge the need for a political solution. For the nationalist communist Gomułka, Soviet dictation of internal Polish policies was too much."

Edward Gierek, who appeared to be more open to workers' needs and to have strong political ties to the working class, soon replaced Gomułka. This was the first occasion in Europe since World War II that labor strikes were able to remove a ruler from power.

Gierek emphasized economic reforms during the first half of his tenure. According to R. J. Crampton: "The stated objective of the reforms was to increase living standards; a less publicly attested motivation was the knowledge that, with prices fixed and with demand increasing, goods had to be put into circulation to avoid rampant inflation."

In the years prior to the Gdańsk strikes in 1980, Gierek's reforms did succeed as planned, but the economy of Poland became progressively more unstable. This was due to Poland's reliance on Western markets and on loans that the nation could not repay.

Fueled by large infusions of Western credit, Poland's economic growth rate was one of the world's highest during the first half of the 1970s, but much of the borrowed capital was misspent and the centrally planned economy was unable to use the new resources effectively. The growing debt burden became insupportable in the late 1970s and economic growth had become negative by 1979.

== Strikes of 1980 ==
August 1980 Polish strikes
- Part of the Solidarity Revolution
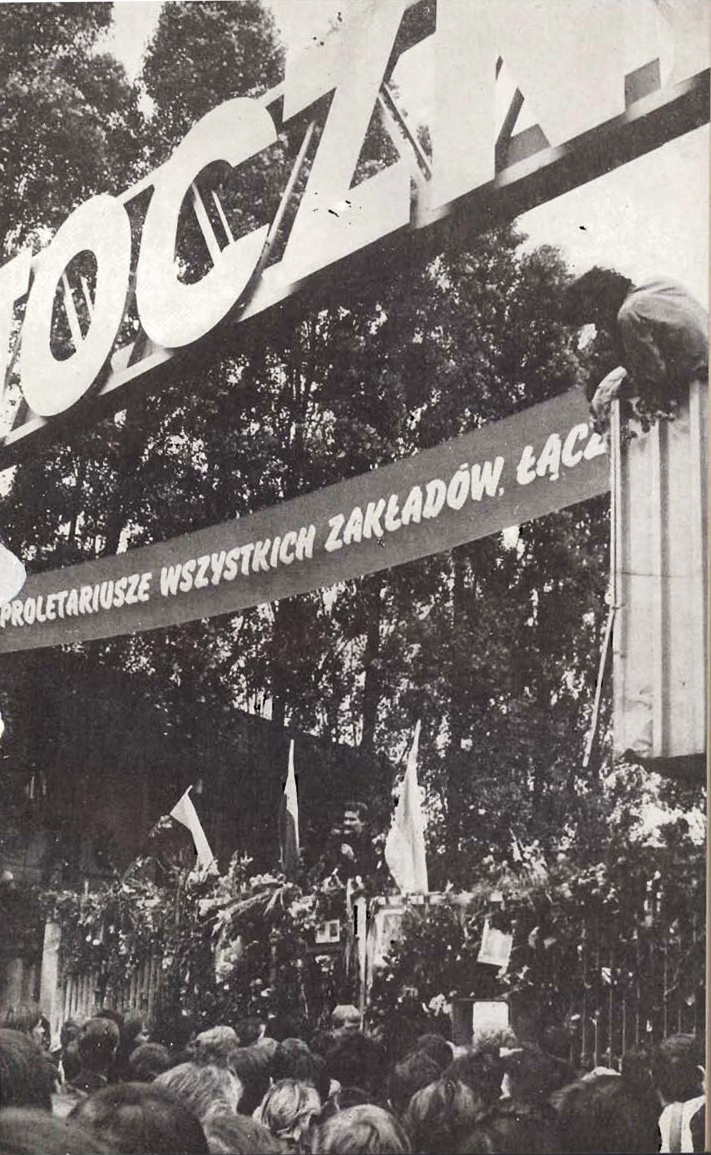
- Gdańsk Shipyard's gate during the strike of 1980; Lech Wałęsa speaks
- Date: 14–31 August 1980
- Location: Poland, especially Gdańsk, Szczecin, Kołobrzeg and other cities
- Caused by: Authoritarianism; Austerity; Exploitation of workers
- Goals: Democratization; Improvement of life conditions Independent labour unions
- Methods: Civil disobedience Strike action
- Result: Opposition victory: Registration of Solidarity trade union; So-called Carnival of Solidarity (period of social liberalization) until December 1981

Parties
Polish People's Republic: Polish United Workers' Party; Citizens' Militia; Motorized Reserves of the Citizens' Militia	(Polish People's Republic) Inter-Enterprise Strike Committee; Support: (Polish People's Republic) Polish opposition; KSS-KOR; ROPCiO; Free Trade Unions of the Coast; Catholic Church in Poland; Confederation of Independent Poland

Lead figures
(Polish People's Republic) Edward Gierek (Polish People's Republic) Mieczysław Jagielski (Polish People's Republic) Tadeusz Fiszbach (Polish People's Republic) Jerzy Młynarczyk (Polish People's Republic) Klemens Gniech (Polish People's Republic) Edward Babiuch (Polish People's Republic) Józef Pińkowski (Polish People's Republic) Wojciech Jaruzelski	(Polish People's Republic) Lech Wałęsa (Polish People's Republic) Bogdan Lis (Polish People's Republic) Jacek Kuroń (Polish People's Republic) Antoni Macierewicz (Polish People's Republic) Mieczysław Boruta-Spiechowicz (Polish People's Republic) Anna Walentynowicz (Polish People's Republic) Adam Michnik (Polish People's Republic) Alina Pienkowska (Polish People's Republic) Leszek Moczulski (Polish People's Republic) Jerzy Popiełuszko

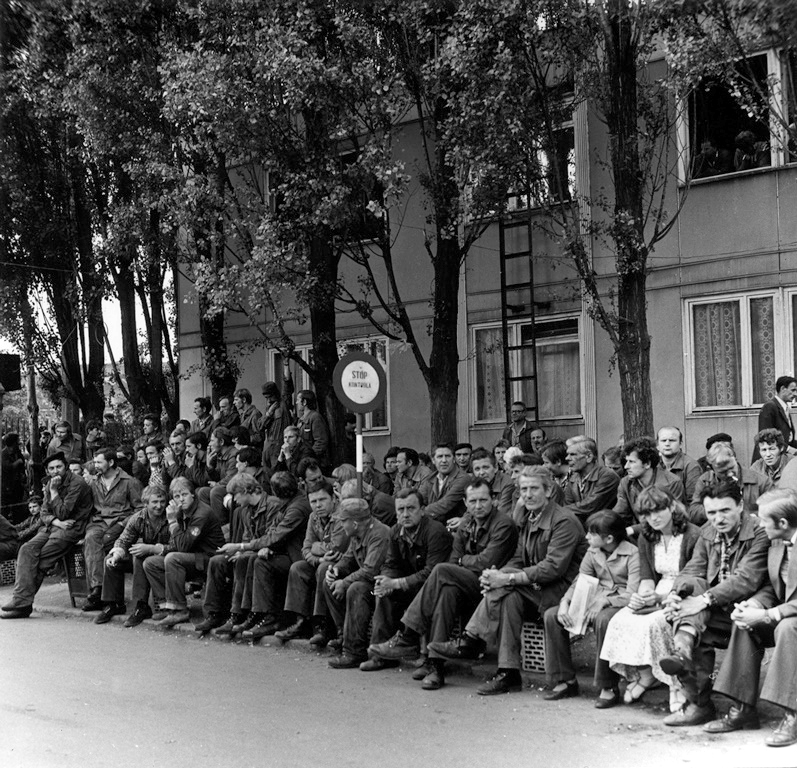
Lenin Shipyard employees on strike in August 1980

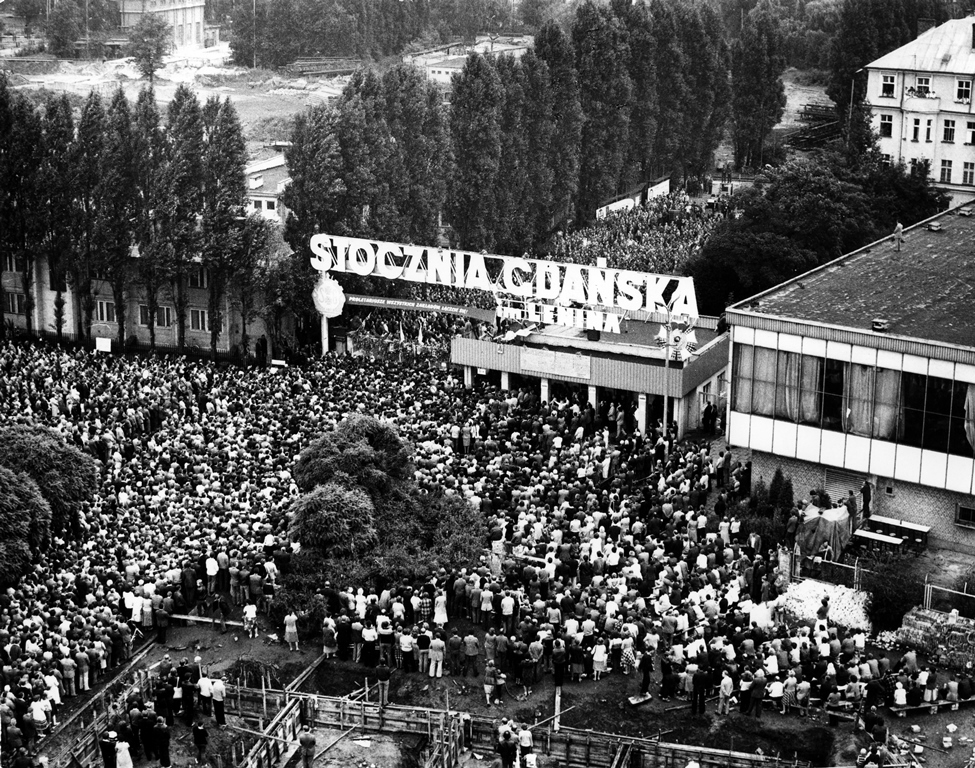
Citizens of Gdańsk gathered outside the gate to the Lenin Shipyard during the strike in August 1980.

As the economic crisis deepened, the Communist government authorized an increase in food prices for the summer of 1980. Labor unrest once again erupted throughout the nation. Workers of the Lenin Shipyard in Gdańsk ultimately went on strike in mid-August, sparked by the firing of Anna Walentynowicz.

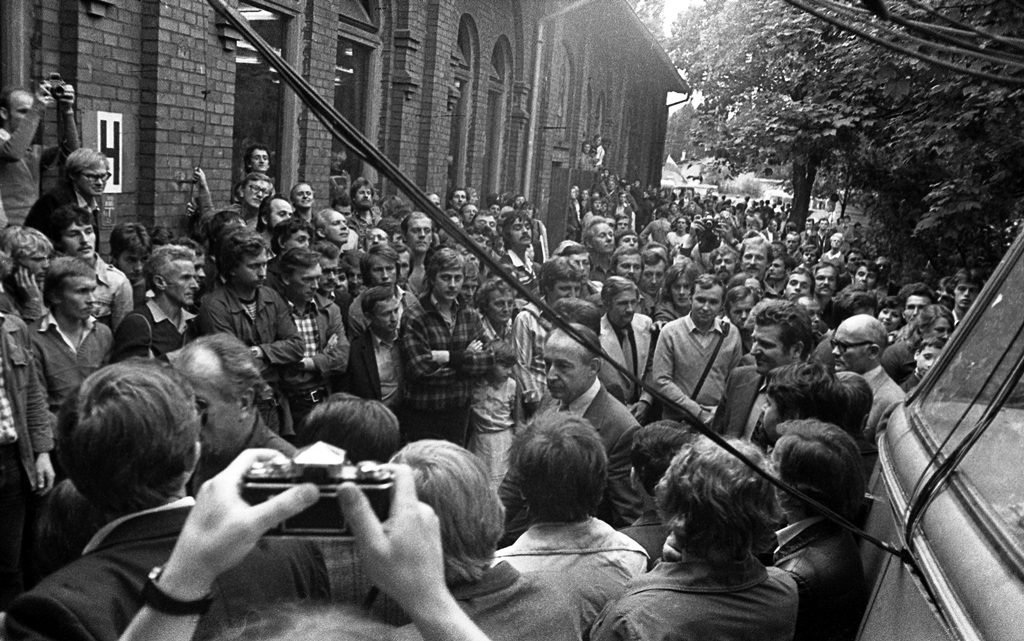
Government delegates: Mieczysław Jagielski and Tadeusz Fiszbach and Klemens Gniech (Lenin Shipyard manager) arriving for negotiations with MKS, 21 August 1980

Led by electrician Lech Wałęsa, the workers took control of the shipyard and demanded labor reform and greater civil rights, including freedom of expression and religion, and the release of political prisoners. On the third day of the strike, 16 August 1980, management granted Lenin Shipyard workers their working and pay demands. Wałęsa and others announced the end of the strike; however, the women of the shipyard, Anna Walentynowicz and Alina Pienkowska, transformed a strike over bread- and- butter issues into a solidarity strike in sympathy with other striking establishments.

== Agreement ==
Due to the popular support of the citizens and other striking groups, the Gdańsk workers held out until the government gave in to their demands. The successful strikers concluded the Gdańsk Agreement on 31 August 1980 as a social contract with the government. This allowed citizens to bring about democratic changes within the communist political structure. The main concern of the workers was the establishment of a trade union independent of communist party control and the legal right to strike. The creation of these new groups would provide clear representation of the workers' needs.

"These new unions are intended to defend the social and material interests of the workers, and not to play the role of a political party, they will be established on the basis of socialization of the means of production and of the socialist system that exists in Poland today." Other major concerns included controlling commercial prices, the use of foreign money in all internal economic dealings, and ensuring the proper supply of resources within the nation while exporting only the surplus. These measures were intended to improve the prospects for prosperity of all working citizens.

== Points ==
1. Acceptance of free trade unions independent of the Communist Party and of enterprises, in accordance with convention No. 87 of the International Labor Organization concerning the right to form free trade unions, which was ratified by the Communist Government of Poland.
2. A guarantee of the right to strike and of the security of strikers and those aiding them.
3. Compliance with the constitutional guarantee of freedom of speech, the press and publication, including freedom for independent publishers, and the availability of the mass media to representatives of all faiths.
4. A return of former rights to: 1) People dismissed from work after the 1970 and 1976 strikes, and 2) Students expelled from school because of their views. The release of all political prisoners, among them Edward Zadrozynski, Jan Kozlowski, and Marek Kozlowski. A halt in repression of the individual because of personal conviction.
5. Availability to the mass media of information about the formation of the Inter-factory Strike Committee and publication of its demands.
6. The undertaking of actions aimed at bringing the country out of its crisis situation by the following means: a) making public complete information about the social-economic situation, and b) enabling all sectors and social classes to take part in discussion of the reform programme.
7. Compensation of all workers taking part in the strike for the period of the strike, with vacation pay from the Central Council of Trade Unions.
8. An increase in the base pay of each worker by 2,000 złoty a month as compensation for the recent raise in prices.
9. Guaranteed automatic increases in pay on the basis of increases in prices and the decline in real income.
10. A full supply of food products for the domestic market, with exports limited to surpluses.
11. The abolition of 'commercial' prices and of other sales for hard currency in special shops.
12. The selection of management personnel on the basis of qualifications, not party membership. Privileges of the secret police, regular police and party apparatus are to be eliminated by equalizing family subsidies, abolishing special stores, etc.
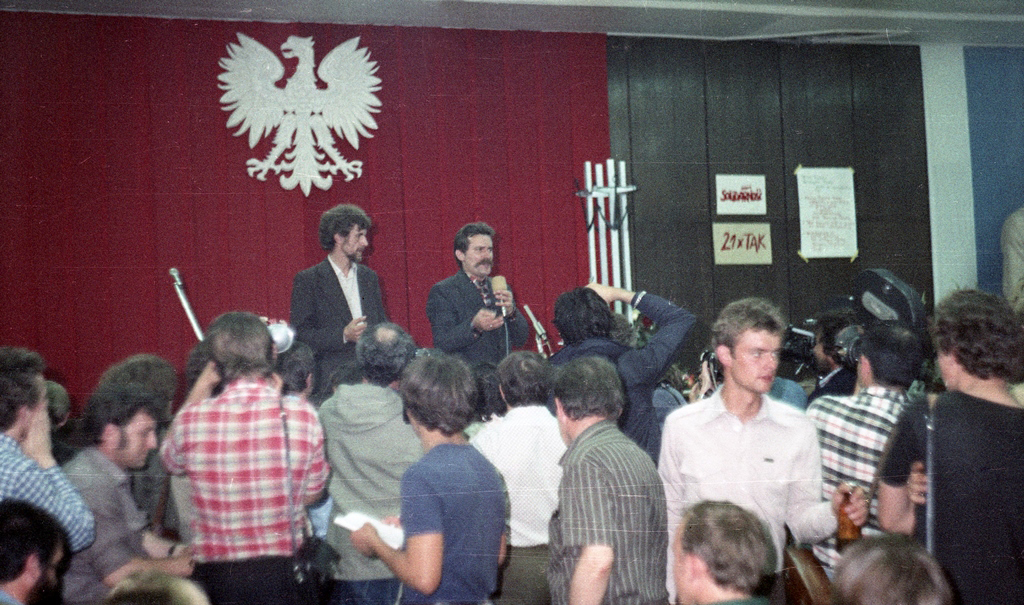
  Strike committee at the Lenin Shipyard, 31 August 1980. On stage are Bogdan Lis (left) and Lech Wałęsa (right).
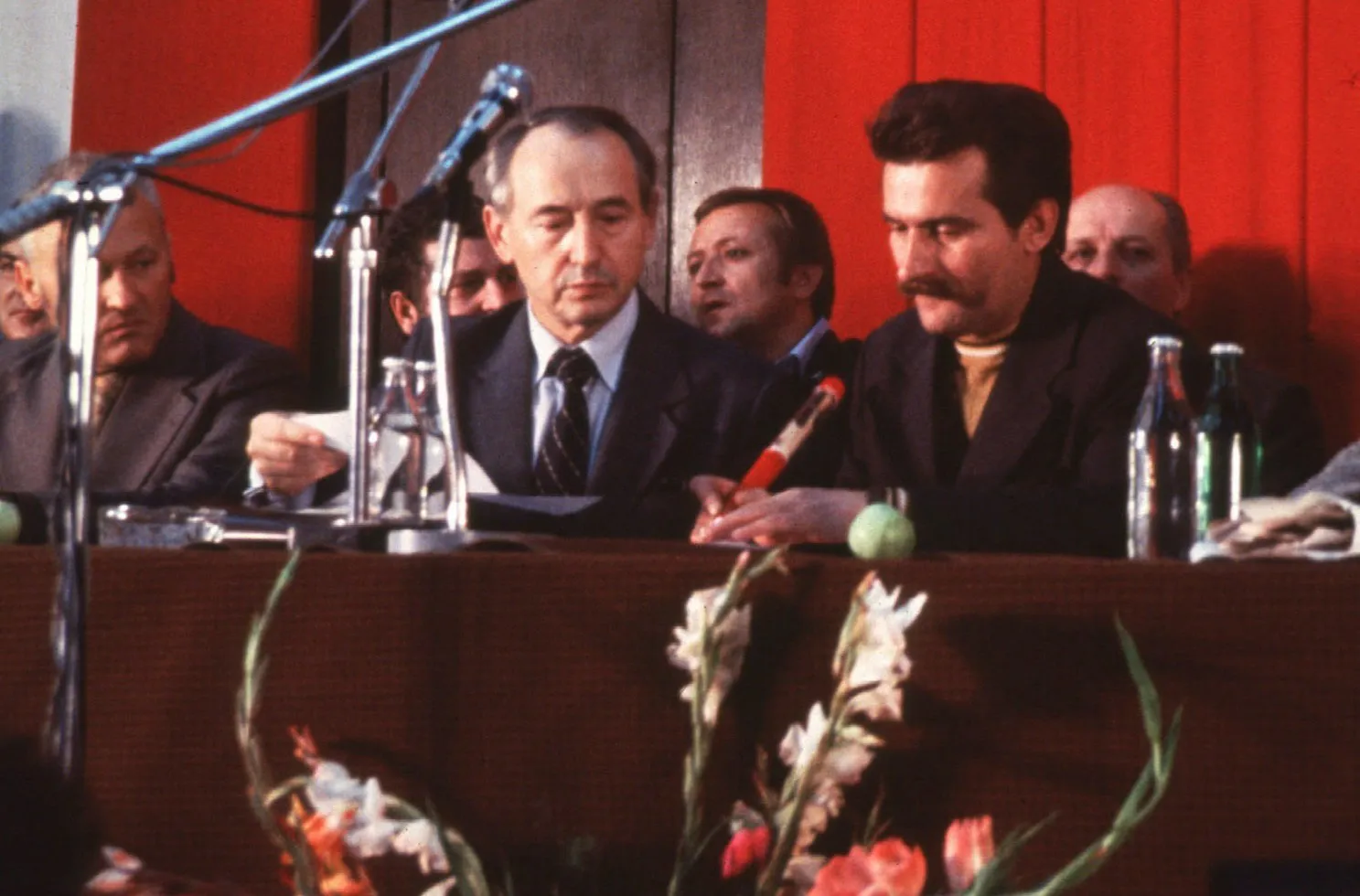
13. Lech Wałęsa (representing the Inter-Enterprise Strike Committee) signing August Agreements with Mieczysław Jagielski (representing the Polish United Workers' Party) while using his characteristic pen, 31 August 1980
  The introduction of food coupons for meat and meat products (during the period in which control of the market situation is regained).
14. Reduction in the age for retirement for women to 50 and for men to 55, or after 30 years' employment in Poland for women and 35 years for men, regardless of age.
15. Conformity of old-age pensions and annuities with what has actually been paid in.
16. Improvements in the working conditions of the health service to insure full medical care for workers.
17. Assurances of a reasonable number of places in day-care centers and kindergartens for the children of working mothers.
18. Paid maternity leave for three years.
19. A decrease in the waiting period for apartments.
20. An increase in the commuter's allowance to 100 złoty from 40, with a supplemental benefit on separation.
21. A day of rest on Saturday. Workers in the brigade system or round-the-clock jobs are to be compensated for the loss of free Saturdays with an increased leave or other paid time off.

== Impact ==
The Gdańsk Agreement is significant in Polish politics because the strikes exposed corruption and negligence within the state's leadership. By recognizing individual rights such as freedom of expression, the government opened the way for the creation of civil societies. This allowed citizens to come together and agree on human rights regardless of party beliefs. The problems caused by the labor movements and the ensuing Gdańsk Agreement led to the removal of Edward Gierek and the installation of Stanisław Kania in September 1980.

Solidarność (Solidarity), the independent trade union that emerged from the Lenin Shipyard strike, was unprecedented in the history of Poland. Although it was mainly a labor movement representing workers led by chairman Wałęsa, it attracted a diverse membership that quickly grew to 10 million people nationwide, a quarter of the country's population. Due to its size and newfound power, the union assumed the role of a national reform lobby with considerable influence on Polish politics.

Lech Wałęsa used a distinctive pen bearing Pope John Paul II's image to sign the agreement. The signing was shown on television networks around the world, bringing financial success to the manufacturer's family business and attracting attention for breaching conventions.

On the second anniversary of the agreement, 31 August 1982, a massive wave of anti-government demonstrations took place across Poland. The government responded with police force; according to Solidarity, at least seven people were killed throughout Poland.
