= Bogdan Lis =

Polish trade unionist and businessman

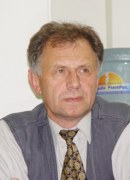
Bogdan Lis

Bogdan Jerzy Lis (born 1952 in Gdańsk) worked in Port of Gdańsk and Elmor company. Between 1971 and 1972 he was imprisoned for his participation in the anti-governmental coastal cities protests. In 1975, he joined the Polish United Workers' Party. He also co-founded the independent trade union confederation Free Trade Unions of the Coast (Wolne Związki Zawodowe Wybrzeża) in 1978.

In mid-1980 he organized the strike in Elmor, and took part in the creation of the Inter-Enterprise Strike Committee (Międzyzakładowy Komitet Strajkowy) and soon afterwards, together with Lech Wałęsa and others, of the NSZZ Solidarity itself (he was the vice chair of the Founding Committee of Solidarity).

After martial law in Poland in December 1981 led to the arrests of many Solidarity members, including Wałęsa, Lis went into hiding and in underground became one of the leaders of the Temporary Coordinating Committee (Tymczasowa Komisja Koordynacyjna), which served as an underground leadership of Solidarity. In that organization Lis was responsible for cooperation between Solidarity and its foreign supporters. He was arrested in June 1984, accused of treason but released half a year later after amnesty was given to many imprisoned Solidarity activists. He was arrested again in 1985 and released in September 1986 after another amnesty.

In 1986, he became a member of now legal Temporary Council of NSZZ Solidarność (Tymczasowa Ra da NSZZ Solidarność), and in 1987 of Country Executive Committee of NSZZ Solidarność (Krajowa Komisja Wykonawcza NSZZ Solidarność).

In 1988, he was a participant of the Polish Round Table Agreement, and was elected to the Senate of Poland in the 1989 Polish legislative elections.

After the 1991 Polish parliamentary election, he distanced himself from national politics and started business career, although he was still active in local political arena in Gdańsk. He joined the Polish Freedom Union Party (Unia Wolności) in 1997. As of 2007, he is a member of the UW successor Democratic Party – demokraci.pl.

He is currently CEO of a private firm, member of the Advisory Council of Freedom Union Party, and President of the Solidarity Centre Foundation. After the 2007 elections, he became member of the Polish Sejm.
