= Free Trade Unions of the Coast =

Trade union in Poland

Free Trade Unions of the Coast (Polish: Wolne Związki Zawodowe Wybrzeża, WZZW, also translated as the Committee for Independent Trade Unions for the Coast) were a government-independent trade union in the People's Republic of Poland.

This trade union was founded in Gdańsk on 29 April 1978 by Andrzej Gwiazda, Krzysztof Wyszkowski and Antoni Sokołowski. The choice of the date was not accidental: the founders issued a declaration that "today, on the eve of the May Day, the holiday symbolizing for more than eighty years the struggle for workers' rights, we constitute the Initiating Committee of the Free Trading Unions (Komitet Założycielski Wolnych Związków Zawodowych)". The founders also condemned official, state-subordinated trade unions as a "subordinated instrument for the organized exploitation of all social groups".

Free Trade Unions of the Coast were not a national organization and organized workers only from the coastal 'Tricity' area. They were one of several free trade unions founded in Poland in the late 1970s (others were founded in Katowice, Radom and Szczecin). The Free Trade Unions of the Coast were likely the most significant trade union in Poland before the advent of NSZZ Solidarity (Solidarność).

The idea of forming independent trade unions was first raised by the striking workers during the coastal cities events in 1970. Free Trade Unions of the Coast were a non-governmental organization, independently defending citizen's and workers rights to create organizations free from control from the state and working towards restoring democratic controls in Poland. It had its own underground biweekly newspaper (bibuła), Robotnik Wybrzeża (Worker of the Coast).

By the summer of 1980 the Free Trade Unions of the Coast drawing support from ROPCiO and KOR, became the stronghold of the free trade union movement in Poland. Free Trade Unions organized the strike in Lenin Shipyard in Gdańsk in August 1980, and were instrumental in the creation of Inter-Enterprise Strike Committee (Międzyzakładowy Komitet Strajkowy), whose 21 demands led to the signing of the Gdańsk Agreement and eventually to the creation of the famous NSZZ Solidarity (Solidarność).

== Quotes ==
From the founding declaration of the Free Trade Unions

- “the society will not struggle for the right to democratic government (...) the genuine social organizations and associations may save the country, since the only means to consolidate the interests and will of the citizens with the interests and the power of the country is democratization”
