= Zbigniew Bujak =

Polish politician

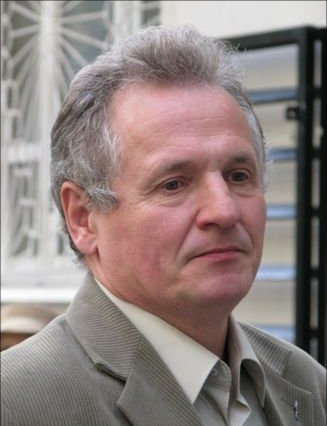
Bujak in 2008

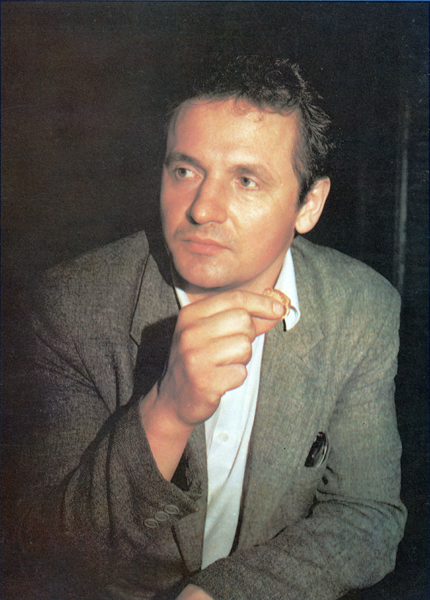
Bujak in 1991

Zbigniew Bujak (born 29 November 1954) is a former Polish activist and anti-Communist dissident.

== Biography ==
Bujak was an electrician and foreman in 1980 at the Ursus tractor factory near Warsaw, Poland. He became engaged with trade union activists, and during the strike action, he organized strike committees at the Ursus factory. He became chairman of the Warsaw Solidarity branch in September 1980 and was one of the few Solidarity leaders who escaped arrest in 1981 after martial law in Poland was declared to break Solidarity. He became one of the leaders of Solidarity's underground movement, organizing underground committees including underground press and radio. He was finally arrested in 1986, becoming the last Solidarity leader to be captured. Soon afterwards, he was released in general amnesty, and participated in the Polish Round Table Talks with the government in 1989. He was elected to the Sejm (Polish parliament) in the 1989 elections. In the 1990s he joined right-wing, liberal political parties, including the Citizens' Movement for Democratic Action, Democratic Union and Freedom Union. In 1992, he helped found the Labour Union (UP) party and was one of the party's leading members. He won a seat to the Sejm at the 1993 legislative elections, representing UP, and served as a member of parliament until 1997. He also held the position of chairman of Główny Urząd Ceł (Main Tariff's Office). In the 2000s (decade), after his 2002 defeat for the post of mayor of Warsaw, he stopped participating actively in politics.

Bujak was a recipient of the Robert F. Kennedy Human Rights Award in 1986.
