= Inter-Enterprise Strike Committee =

Polish strike committee

Coordinates: 54°22′23.956″N 18°39′39.358″E

Inter-Enterprise Strike Committee (or Inter-Factory Strike Committee, Polish: Międzyzakładowy Komitet Strajkowy, MKS) was an action strike committee formed in Gdańsk Shipyard, People's Republic of Poland on 16 August 1980. It was led by Lech Wałęsa and others and is famous for issuing the 21 demands of MKS on 17 August, that eventually led to the Gdańsk Agreement and creation of Solidarity.

== Background ==
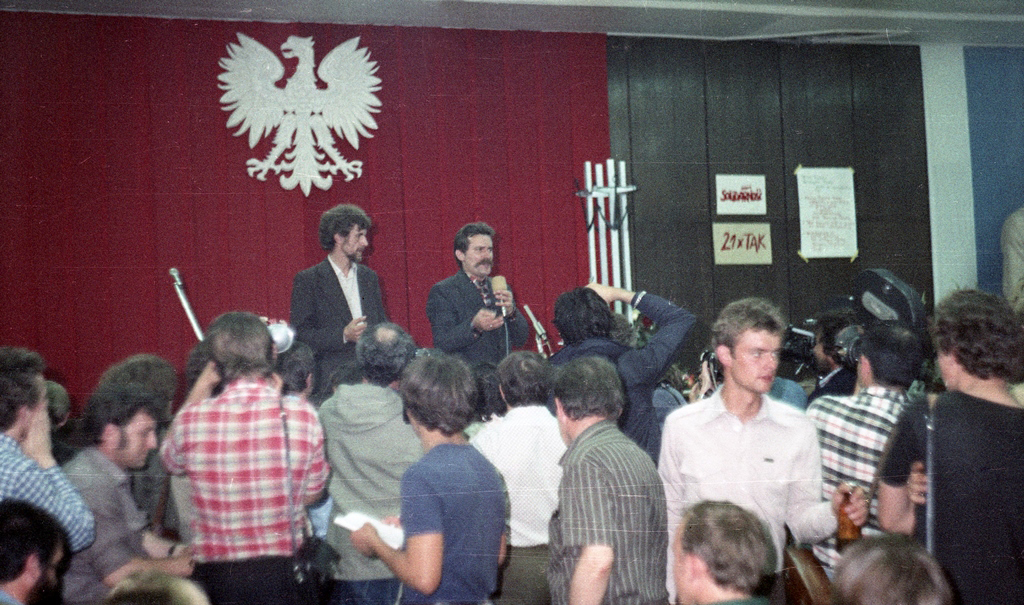
Meeting of the Inter-Enterprise Strike Committee; Lech Wałęsa is speaking, with Bogdan Lis standing nearby. On the chairman's table is a model of the Monument to the Fallen Shipyard Workers, the construction of which was one of the strikers' demands.

The widespread strikes of 1980 were far from being the first clashes between the ruling party and the working class in Poland after World War II. Despite having a "socialist" government, the elite of the Polish ruling class averaged an income twenty times that of the blue-collar worker. This elite ruling class owned or largely controlled the police, media and industry of the state, including the state-organized unions. Insufficient pay and food shortages, in addition to a growing movement in favor of independent union activism led to strikes in 1956 and 1970 which left hundreds of workers dead from clashes with police, and both the 1970 and 1976 strikes ended with some concessions but subsequent additional repressions from management. Workers were increasingly dissatisfied with their standard of living and the half-hearted responses of the government to their calls for social justice, and when in July 1980 the government attempted to raise the price of meat even further, sit-in strikes started up again.

== The early days ==
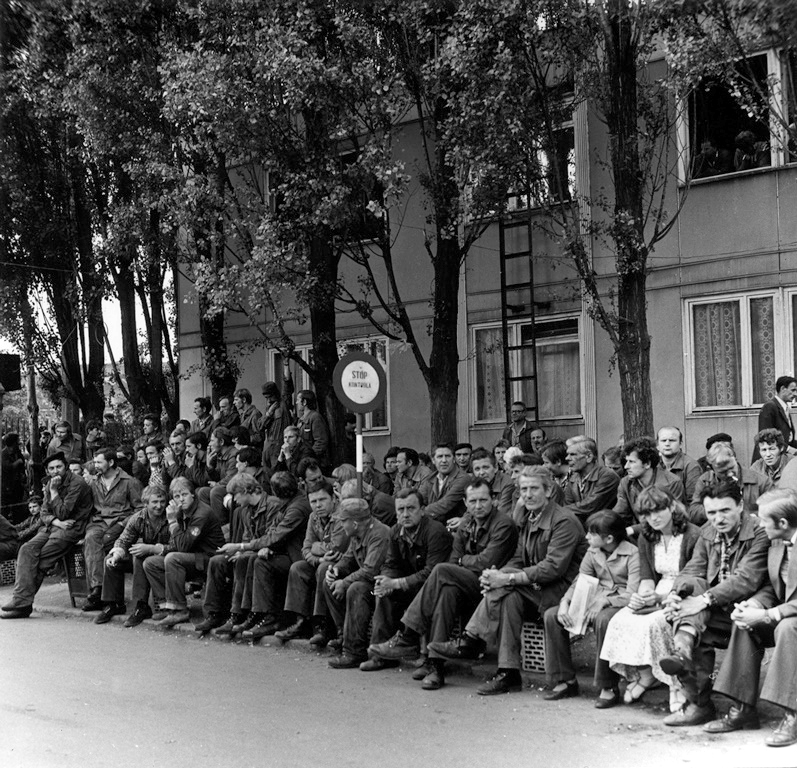
Lenin Shipyard employees on strike in August 1980

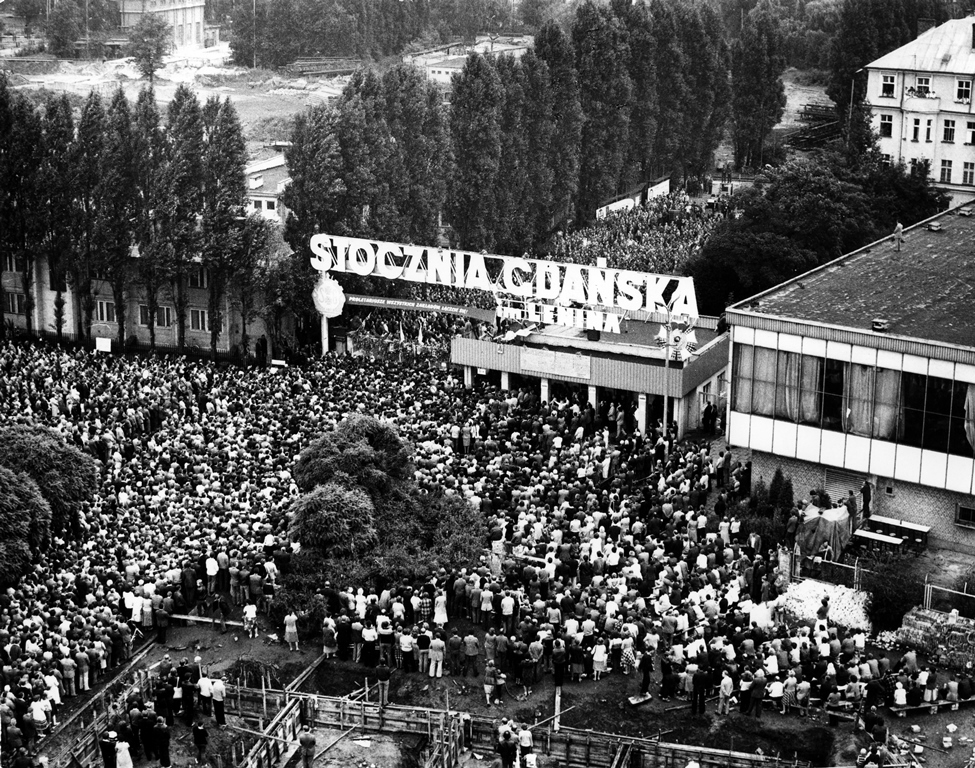
Citizens of Gdańsk gathered outside the gate to the Lenin Shipyard during the strike in August 1980

When, in August 1980, Anna Walentynowicz lost her job at the Gdańsk Shipyard because of her position as editor of the underground newspaper Robotnik Wybrzeze, her fellow workers took action. Around 16,000 employees of the shipyard discontinued their work and occupied its premises on the morning of August 14, demanding Walentynowicz's re-employment, the erection of a monument in honor of the victims of the strikes of 1970, and a pay rise of 2000 zlotys, amongst other things. After negotiating with management and having most of their demands met, a vote was taken on August 16 leading to the strike being called off. By this time, however, many of the workers at facilities surrounding the Gdańsk Shipyard had begun their own strikes making similar demands, and it was decided that in solidarity with them, the workers in the shipyard would continue to strike despite their own demands having been met. By the next morning the Inter-Enterprise Strike Committee (Polish shorthand: MKS) had been formed within the gates of the shipyard, intending to unite workers in the Gdańsk-Sopot-Gdynia area, coordinating action and maintaining and order to ensure the safety of the strikers. Lech Wałęsa, an electrician who had lost his job at the Gdańsk Shipyard in the strikes of 1976 was elected as chair of the MKS, while the remainder of the committee was composed of delegates from other facilities including Bogdan Lis, Andrzej Gwiazda, and others. By August 18, the MKS represented workers from 156 separate enterprises, and the number was steadily growing. Just two days after the formation of MKS the Polish economy was brought to a standstill as workers struck at factories and ports all along the Baltic coast. By August 21, much of the country was affected by strikes, even including the inland mines of the Upper Silesian Industrial Area, as more and more workers joined independent unions. The Inter-Enterprise Strike Committee at Gdańsk was becoming the national center for trade union movement: a phenomenon which was itself unique to this series of events. In the strikes of the 1950s and '70s it was the lack of a central organized structure that had limited the mobilization potential of striking workers. Now the MKS had been specifically designed with this problem in mind - the decentralization of the workers' movement – and was working for the first time to unify and strengthen the movement, coordinating strikes all across Poland. It was for this reason that the government of Edward Gierek found they could no longer buy off strikers with small concessions, and finally had to settle into heavy negotiations with the MKS.

== Negotiations ==
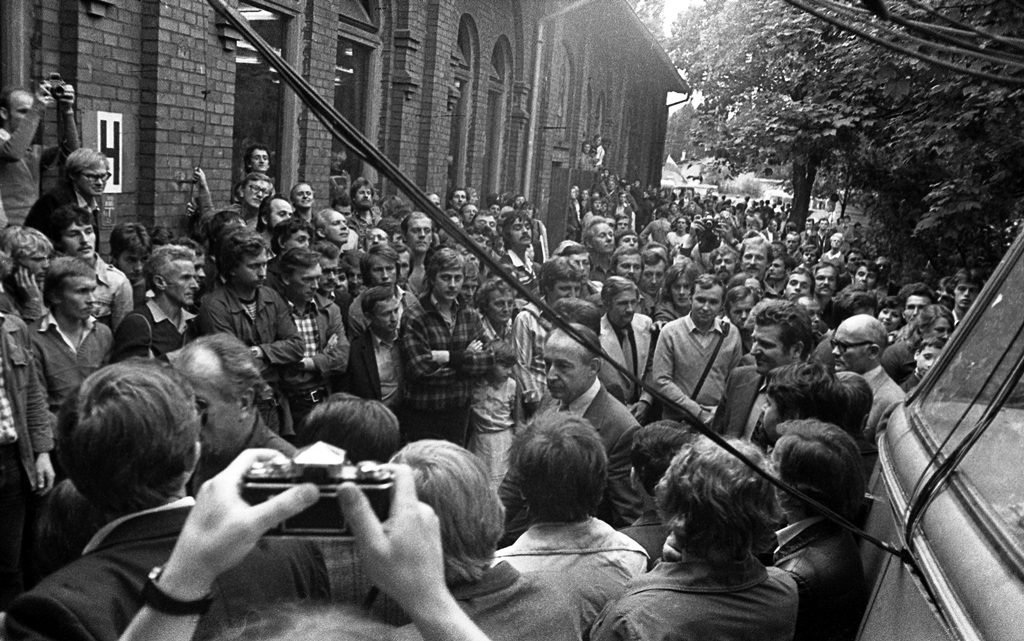
Government delegates: Mieczysław Jagielski and Tadeusz Fiszbach and Klemens Gniech (Lenin Shipyard manager) arriving for negotiations with MKS

On the day that the committee was formed, August 17, MKS posted a handwritten list of twenty-one demands in the shipyard. These demands were far broader and all-encompassing that the original postulates of the Gdańsk strikers, pushing for free trade unions and the legal right to strike, an end to the repression of independent activists, improvement of health care services, and the increased availability of basic consumer goods and foodstuffs, amongst other things. In these demands, the workers were calling on the government to protect the constitutional rights of the Polish people, and take steps to improve the low standard of living of blue-collar citizens. After weeks of negotiations with Wałęsa and his MKS, the Communist party first secretary Edward Gierek was forced to accede to all twenty-one of the strikers' demands, signing the Gdańsk Agreement on August 31, which allowed workers the right to strike and organise independent unions.

== Solidarity ==
With the signing of the Gdańsk Agreement on August 31, delegates from MKS – representing 3500 separate enterprises and 3 million workers, intellectuals and students – met in Gdańsk. The Inter-Enterprise Strike Committee, which had become a national federation of unions now officially became Poland's first independent trade union since World War II: Solidarity (Solidarność). Some historians claim that within weeks Solidarity's membership included almost 80 percent of Poland's working population, while more conservative estimates claim membership peaked at 50 percent.
