= 21 demands of the Inter-Enterprise Strike Committee =

List of demands issued on 17 August 1980 in Poland

The 21 demands of the Inter-Enterprise Strike Committee (Polish: 21 postulatów MKS) was a list of demands issued on 17 August 1980 by the Inter-Enterprise Strike Committee in Poland.

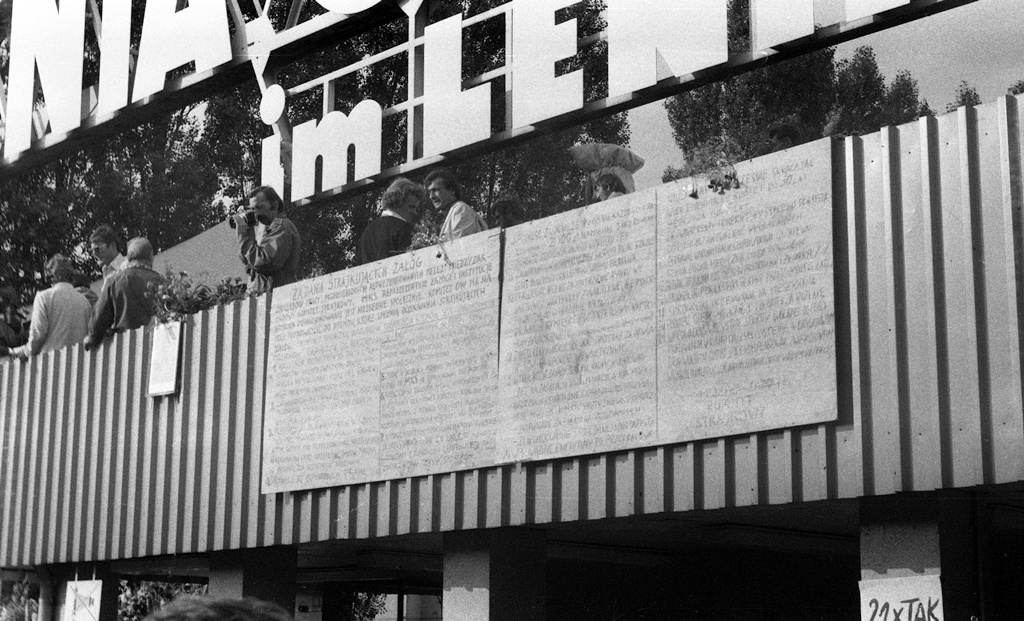
Boards with the 21 demands displayed by the entrance gate to the Lenin Shipyard in August 1980

The first demand was the right to create independent trade unions. Other demands called the government to respect the constitutional rights and freedoms, dismantling the privileges for Polish United Workers' Party members, and taking actions to improve the economic conditions of Polish citizens. The demands eventually led to the Gdańsk Agreement and creation of Solidarity.

The charter was written up on two wooden boards and hung on the gates of the shipyard on 18 August 1980. To mark the first anniversary of the August unrest, the demands were put on display in Gdańsk’s Maritime Museum. The day after Martial Law was declared one museum worker hid them in his loft, where they remained forgotten until 1996. Now added to the UNESCO Memory of the World Register, they can be found housed in Gdańsk’s Roads to Freedom exhibition.

== Text ==
1. Acceptance of free trade unions independent of the Communist Party and of enterprises, in accordance with convention No. 87 of the International Labour Organization concerning the right to form free trade unions.

2. A guarantee of the right to strike and of the security of strikers.

3. Compliance with the constitutional guarantee of freedom of speech, the press and publication, including freedom for independent publishers, and the availability of the mass media to representatives of all faiths.

4. A return of former rights to: 1) People dismissed from work after the 1970 and 1976 strikes. 2) Students expelled because of their views. The release of all political prisoners, among them Edmund Zadrozynski, Jan Kozlowski, and Marek Kozlowski. A halt in repression of the individual because of personal conviction.

5. Availability to the mass media of information about the formation of the Inter-factory Strike Committee and publication of its demands.

6. Bringing the country out of its crisis situation by the following means: a) making public complete information about the social-economic situation. b) enabling all social classes to take part in discussion of the reform programme.

7. Compensation of all workers taking part in the strike for the period of the strike.

8. An increase in the pay of each worker by 2,000 złoty a month.

9. Guaranteed automatic increases in pay on the basis of increases in prices and the decline in real income.

10. A full supply of food products for the domestic market, with exports limited to surpluses.

11. The introduction of food coupons for meat and meat products (until the market stabilizes).

12. The abolition of commercial prices and sales for Western currencies in the so-called internal export companies.

13. Selection of management personnel on the basis of qualifications, not party membership, and elimination of privileges for the state police, security service, and party apparatus by equalization of family allowances and elimination of special sales, etc.

14. Reduction in the age for retirement for women to 50 and for men to 55, or (regardless of age) after working for 30 years (for women) or 35 years (for men).

15. Conformity of old-age pensions and annuities with what has actually been paid in.

16. Improvements in the working conditions of the health service.

17. Assurances of a reasonable number of places in day-care centers and kindergartens for the children of working mothers.

18. Paid maternity leave for three years.

19. A decrease in the waiting period for apartments.

20. An increase in the commuter’s allowance to 100 złoty.

21. A day of rest on Saturday. Workers in the brigade system or round-the-clock jobs are to be compensated for the loss of free Saturdays with increased leave or other paid time off.
