= 1981 in Poland =

- Decades: 1960s; 1970s; 1980s; 1990s; 2000s
- See also: Other events of 1981; Timeline of Polish history

== Incumbents ==
=== Members of the government ===
- Prime Ministers of Poland - Józef Pińkowski (until February 11, 1981), Wojciech Jaruzelski (February 11, 1981 – November 6, 1985)
- First Secretaries of the Communist Party (PZPR) - Stanisław Kania (until October 18, 1981), Wojciech Jaruzelski (October 18, 1981 - July 29, 1989)
- Minister of National Defence - Wojciech Jaruzelski
- For members of the Polish Politburo, see Politburo of the Polish United Workers' Party

=== Other personalities ===
- Roman Catholic Primate of Poland - Stefan Wyszyński (until his death, May 28, 1981), Józef Glemp (September 12, 1981 – December 18, 2009),
- President of Polish government-in-exile - Edward Raczyński
- Prime Minister of Polish government-in-exile - Kazimierz Sabbat

== Events ==
=== January ===
- January 2. In Rzeszów, individual peasants headed by Jan Kułaj, enter former office of Provincial Council of Trade Unions (WRZZ), occupying it in protest of unjust share of WRZZ's assets.
- January 5. Farmers, protesting in Ustrzyki Dolne, are reinforced with members of Solidarity, who come from different parts of the country. In Rzeszów, peasants join protesting workers of the WSK PZL Rzeszów, and together they occupy the Rail House. Farmers demand registration of Rural Solidarity.
- January 6. Protesting farmers in Ustrzyki Dolne create All-Polish Strike Committee of Rural Solidarity, with Jan Kułaj as chairman.
- January 7. In Gdańsk, the National Coordinating Commission (KKP) declares that upon the Jastrzębie-Zdrój Agreement, all Saturdays are work-free. Also, the KKP expresses its solidarity with peasants, protesting in Rzeszów and Ustrzyki Dolne. Tadeusz Mazowiecki becomes editor-in-chief of Tygodnik Solidarność. A decision is taken to close down the Skawina Aluminum Smelter, and to cease production of cellulose in a factory in Jelenia Góra.
- January 8. National Coordinating Commission urges the nation not to come to work on Saturday, January 10. The fire at Karlino (see Karlino oil eruption) is extinguished.
- January 10. First transport of oil from Karlino.
- January 11. Most of protesting farmers of Rural Solidarity move from Ustrzyki Dolne to their colleagues in Rzeszów. On the next day, those who stayed in Ustrzyki, are pacified by ZOMO.
- January 13. First Secretary of the Communist Party, Stanisław Kania, Prime Minister Józef Pińkowski and Minister of Defence Wojciech Jaruzelski meet in Warsaw with Marshall Viktor Kulikov and General Anatoly Gribkov. Kulikov tells Polish officials that they have to solve Polish problems by themselves, and appeals for their loyalty.
- January 15. Solidarity officials meet with Pope John Paul II in Vatican.
- January 21. Student sit-in begins in Łódź. The students demand registration of Independent Students' Union. On the same day, negotiations about work-free Saturdays begin in Warsaw.
- January 24. At the Katowice Steelworks, First All-Polish Congress of Trade Union Press begins, during which Solidarity Press Agency (AS) is created.
- January 26. Strike Committee in Jelenia Góra demands that government's recreation centers should be handed to the public. One-hour warning strike takes place in Bielsko-Biała.
- January 27. A general strike begins in Bielsko-Biała and other towns of the region. The agreement between the government and protesting people, which ends the strike, is signed on February 6. As a result, several high-ranking officials of local authorities and the party are removed from their posts. Te Deum of Krzysztof Penderecki, dedicated to Pope John Paul II.
- January 28. Lech Wałęsa and Bogdan Lis visit individual farmers, protesting in Ustrzyki Dolne and Rzeszów, to declare their support.
- January 30. General strike action begins in Jelenia Góra.

=== February ===
- February 1. A government commission comes to Rzeszów, to talk with protesting farmers. Negotiations are terminated on February 6, because the government does not want to accept the idea of a Rural Solidarity, consisting of individual farmers.
- February 2. In a homily in the Gniezno Cathedral, Primate Stefan Wyszyński supports the right of individual farmers to create their own trade unions.
- February 3. In Rzeszów, leaders of Rural Solidarity, together with officials of Solidarity, issue an appeal to the nation, asking Poles to support their efforts.
- February 6. Primate Wyszyński meets a delegation of farmers. General strike in Bielsko-Biała ends, after an agreement is signed between the government and the workers.
- February 8. 20,000 demonstrate in Bydgoszcz, demanding registration of Rural Solidarity.
- February 9. Ex Prime Minister Piotr Jaroszewicz is expelled from the Polish United Workers' Party.
- February 10. Provincial Court in Warsaw refuses to register Rural Solidarity, arguing that individual farmers are not entitled to create their own union. General strike in Jelenia Góra ends.
- February 11. Polish Sejm nominates General Wojciech Jaruzelski as Prime Minister. In his exposé on the next day, Jaruzelski appeals for “three months without strikes”.
- February 12. Temporary Presidium of Solidarity is created in Gdańsk, with Lech Wałęsa as chairman and the following members: Andrzej Gwiazda (Gdańsk), Ryszard Kalinowski (Elbląg), Zbigniew Bujak (Mazowsze), Tadeusz Jedynak (Jastrzębie-Zdrój), Jan Rulewski (Bydgoszcz), Andrzej Słowik (Łódź), and Stanisław Wądołowski (Szczecin),
- February 14. Lech Wałęsa talks with deputy Prime Minister Mieczyslaw Rakowski.
- February 18. A month-long student strike in Łódź ends, with an agreement, signed by both the government, and the students.
- February 19. In the morning, after 47 days of a protest, and several attempts to break it, the protest of individual farmers ends in Rzeszów, with an agreement, in which the government guaranteed, among others, their right to own the land.
- February 20. An agreement, similar to the one from Rzeszów, is signed in Ustrzyki Dolne, hence it is called the Rzeszów - Ustrzyki Agreement.
- February 21. General Wojciech Jaruzelski accepts the “war game”, and orders a document titled “About the state of preparation of the government to introduce martial law”.
- February 22. Solidarity Region of Upper Silesia and Zagłębie Dąbrowskie (Region Śląsko-Dąbrowski) is created, when regional offices from Bytom, Jastrzębie-Zdrój and Tychy join forces.
- February 23. In Moscow, Leonid Brezhnev states that Polish Communists can count on their Soviet friends.
- February 26. Polish Ministry of Internal Affairs creates a list of prisons, which will be used during the martial law.

=== March ===
- March 3–4. Polish delegation visits Moscow. General Jaruzelski informs his hosts about preparations for the martial law, assuring them that with Soviet cooperation, he is determined to protect Poland from “counterrevolution”.
- March 8. A demonstration takes place at Warsaw University, to commemorate the 1968 Polish political crisis. In Poznań, Congress of Rural Solidarity begins.
- March 9. Lech Wałęsa and Marian Jurczyk meet with deputy prime minister Mieczysław Rakowski, and discuss conflicts in several locations of the country (Łódź, Radom, Nowy Sącz, Suwałki).
- March 16. Manoeuvres of the Warsaw Pact armies, Soyuz’81, begin in Poland. In Bydgoszcz, Rural Solidarity activists begin a sit-in of provincial office of the United People's Party. They demand legalization of the union, and the protest is backed by the Bydgoszcz branch of Solidarity.
- March 19. Some 1,300 officers of Communist Police come to Bydgoszcz. In the evening of that day, Bydgoszcz events take place.
- March 20–21. Solidarity presidium convenes in Gdańsk, announcing readiness for a general, nationwide strike, in protest of the Bydgoszcz events.
- March 21. A two-hour general strike takes place in Bydgoszcz. Strike readiness is announced by students of the Independent Students’ Association. Communist propaganda begins an attack on Jan Rulewski.
- March 22. Negotiations between the government and Solidarity leaders take place in Warsaw. Primate Stefan Wyszyński appeals for patience and calm.
- March 23. A decision to carry out a nationwide warning strike is taken by Solidarity in Bydgoszcz. A National Strike Committee with eleven members is selected. It is headed by Lech Wałęsa, and its members are: Zbigniew Bujak, Andrzej Cierniewski, Lech Dymarski, Krzysztof Gotowski, Andrzej Gwiazda, Marian Jurczyk, Ryszard Kalinowski, Antoni Kopczewski, Bogdan Lis, Andrzej Słowik. Solidarity press gives instructions on how to behave in case of an armed intervention of the Soviets. Unknown perpetrators set fire to the apartment of Feliks Gołębiewski, local Solidarity activist from Białystok.
- March 24. Soyuz’81 manoeuvres are prolonged for unlimited time.
- March 26. Prime minister Wojciech Jaruzelski meets with Primate Wyszyński.
- March 27. A four-hour warning strike takes place in Poland.
- March 28. Negotiations between Solidarity and the government continue. Lech Wałęsa and other Solidarity leaders meet with Primate Wyszyński.
- March 30. Andrzej Gwiazda announces on national TV that the negotiations end with an agreement and a joint announcement.
- March 31. The Politburo of Polish Communist Party expresses its displeasure at the agreement. Some Solidarity leaders also criticize the agreement, saying that too many concessions were granted to the government.

=== April ===
- April 1. The government introduces ration stamps (see rationing) for meats and sausages (ration stamps for sugar had been in existence since 1976). Local office of Polish TV in Rzeszów is opened.
- April 2. Leaders of Rural Solidarity meet with Primate Wyszyński.
- April 2–6. First council of Independent Students’ Association takes place in Kraków.
- April 3. As U.S. intelligence reports, Soviet troops stationed in the Soviet Union, Czechoslovakia and East Germany began to concentrate along Polish borders. Soviet airplanes, without notifying Polish authorities, carried equipment and soldiers from Czechoslovakia to Poland, their pilots disobeying Polish ground control crews. Government commission comes to Bydgoszcz for talks with protesting farmers. Convention of Independent Students' Union ends in Kraków. First issue of Tygodnik Solidarność is published.
- April 7. Soyuz’81 manoeuvres end.
- April 10. National Coordinating Commission names Janusz Onyszkiewicz spokesman.
- April 14. The network of Solidarity branches of the key factories of Poland is created in Gdańsk (see The network).
- April 15. Democratic activists of the Communist Party (the so-called horizontal movement) gather in Toruń. Representing 204 Party organizations from across the country, they demand, among others, creation of a document, which reveals the actual situation of the Party and of Poland.
- April 17. Farmers’ protest in Bydgoszcz ends. In an agreement, the government pledges to legalize Rural Solidarity by May 10.
- April 19. Committee of Defence of the Country announces that during the planned martial law, additional 47,200 officers will be uniformed.
- April 22. The government introduces ration stamps for butter, flour, rice and kasha (buckwheat).
- April 27. Fourteen people die in a fire of Kaskada restaurant in Szczecin.

=== May ===
- May 6. A riot begins at Wronki Prison, initiating a wave of strikes, riots and hunger strikes at 109 prisons across the country. Inmates demand better living conditions, better pay for their work and respect for their rights as citizens.
- May 7–8. Violent street fights in Otwock (the so-called Otwock Events), during which angry crowd wants to lynch two police officers. Riots end after Adam Michnik, Zbigniew Romaszewski, and other Solidarity leaders pledge for order.
- May 10–16. A delegation of Solidarity visits Japan.
- May 12. Warsaw Provincial Court officially registers the Rural Solidarity.
- May 16–17. First All-Polish Exhibition of Independent Publications takes place at Warsaw University of Technology. In several Polish cities, White Marches are organized. Participants, dressed in white, pray for the health of Pope John Paul II (see Pope John Paul II assassination attempt).
- May 20. In Sosnowiec, a hunger strike begins. Its participants demand the release of political prisoners.
- May 23. Construction of monument of victims of the Poznań 1956 protests begins in Poznań, initiated by the mother of Romek Strzałkowski.
- May 25. First Founding Committee of Independent Trade Union of Milicja Obywatelska is created at a police station in Nowa Huta. Rallies in defence of political prisoners take place in 14 academic centers across Poland, with 100,000 participating.
- May 28. Primate Stefan Wyszyński dies.
- May 30. Stanisław Kania and Wojciech Jaruzelski meet Marshall Viktor Kulikov, who comes to Poland. The funeral of Primate Wyszyński takes place in Warsaw, with thousands of mourners.

=== June ===
- June 1. Some 1,000 members of Founding Committees of Independent Trade Union of Milicja Obywatelska meet in Warsaw.
- June 3. National Coordinating Commission convenes in Bydgoszcz, to announce a two-hour warning strike in four provinces, in protest of still-unexplained circumstances of the Bydgoszcz events. The strike is to take place on June 11.
- June 5. Soviet Politburo sends a letter to the Polish Politburo, in which it states that Polish Party is giving in to the “demands of counter-revolutionists, who are supported by imperialist centers of diversion”. The letter is published by press on June 11. Solidarity delegation takes part in a conference of the International Labour Organization, in Geneva. Czesław Miłosz comes for a two-day visit to Poland.
- June 6. Deputy Prime Minister Mieczysław F. Rakowski states in Bydgoszcz that “people’s government is threatened (...) and the limit of reasonable compromises has been completely exploited”.
- June 7. A group of 24 intellectuals issues a statement, in which it criticises numerous cases of destruction of Soviet war monuments in Poland.
- June 8–9. Talks between Solidarity and the government take place in Warsaw. Solidarity leaders demand explanation of the Bydgoszcz events.
- June 9. The Trade Union Solidarity of Artisans is registered in Warsaw.
- June 9–10. XI Plenary session of PZPR in Warsaw. Party policies are harshly criticized by several hardline Communists, such as Andrzej Żabiński from Katowice. Tadeusz Grabski, secretary of the Politburo states that Stanisław Kania is unable to control the situation in Poland.
- June 11–17. Lech Wałęsa tours the country, visiting Warsaw, Lublin, Chorzów, Jastrzębie, Opole, Wrocław and Poznań, where thousands welcome him.
- June 13. A monument of the Red Army is defiled in Lublin. Lech Wałęsa, who on that day visits Lublin, calls it a provocation, and together with other Solidarity leaders, cleans the monument.
- June 15. Trial of leaders of Confederation of Independent Poland begins in Warsaw.
- June 16. Soviet Army monument is defiled in Żyrardów.
- June 17. Czesław Miłosz meets with workers of the Gdańsk Shipyard. Soviet war monument is defaced in Nowy Sącz.
- June 20–21. First All-Polish meeting of independent publishers takes place in Warsaw. Among participating offices, are ABC (Kraków), Alternatywy (Gdańsk), 3 Maja (Warsaw), Krąg (Warsaw), Młoda Polska (Gdańsk), Spotkania (Lublin-Kraków-Warsaw), NOWa (Warsaw).
- June 25. 5th anniversary of the June 1976 protests is celebrated in Radom and Ursus.
- June 27–28. 25th anniversary of Poznań Uprising is celebrated in Poznań, with 200,000 participating.

=== July ===
- July 7. Archbishop Józef Glemp becomes the Primate of Poland.
- July 14–20. 9th Extraordinary Plenum of PZPR convenes in Warsaw. Stanisław Kania remains First Secretary.
- July 19. In Katowice, security services agents beat up Józef Bocian, participant of the hunger strike in Sosnowiec.
- July 20. Primate Glemp meets with Lech Wałęsa.
- July 23. The government reduces ration cards of meats, and announces rise in food prices.
- July 24–26. National Coordinating Commission meets in Gdańsk to discuss food situation.
- July 30. First hunger demonstrations take place in Łódź, Kutno, Piotrków Trybunalski, Częstochowa and Szczecin (see Summer 1981 hunger demonstrations in Poland).
- July 31. General Czesław Kiszczak becomes Minister of Internal Affairs. First Katyń Monument is erected in Warsaw, at Powązki Cemetery, without the consent of the authorities. A few hours later, upon recommendation of Soviet ambassador, the monument, which consisted of a cross and a stone board with inscription “Katyń 1940”, is taken away by the security.

=== August ===
- August 3–5. A three-day Solidarity blockade of the center of Warsaw takes place. A column of cars, trucks and buses blocks the intersection of Aleje Jerozolimskie and Marszałkowska Street. On August 5, a two-hour warning strike takes place in Warsaw.
- August 3–6. Negotiations between the government and Solidarity in Warsaw. Food supply situation, economic reform and trade unions bills are discussed. The negotiations end in a fiasco; the government accuses Solidarity of terminating the talks.
- August 7. Police and security forces prepare for marches on Warsaw, which were planned by Solidarity for August 17–22.
- August 10. Stefan Bratkowski and other members of Association of Polish Journalist issue a statement, in which they criticize official mass-media for their coverage of the situation in Poland.
- August 10–12. National Coordinating Commission urges the nation to refrain from strikes and other protests. Solidarity Commissions of Social Control are created, which oversee distribution of goods and ration stamps, as well as exports and imports.
- August 14. Stanisław Kania and Wojciech Jaruzelski meet Leonid Brezhnev in Crimea.
- August 19–20. Solidarity organizes “Days Without Press”, in which citizens are urged not to buy any official newspapers.
- August 20–22. First Festival of True Song takes place in Gdańsk, with Jacek Fedorowicz, Przemysław Gintrowski, Jacek Kaczmarski, Jan Pietrzak, Andrzej Rosiewicz, hosted by Daniel Olbrychski.
- August 21. Jerzy Urban becomes the spokesperson of the government.
- August 25–26. Colonel Tadeusz Kwiatkowski of Ministry of Internal Affairs meets KGB officers in Moscow to discuss plans for the martial law. The Soviets pledge their help, among others, posters announcing the martial law are printed in Moscow.
- August 31. Polish Press Agency announces that so far in 1981, 67 Soviet war monuments have been defiled in Poland.

=== September ===
- September 2. III Plenum of the PZPR convenes in Warsaw. Stanisław Kania says in his speech: “Our enemies claim that the government will not introduce martial law in Poland. I want to express strongly and calmly, that in defence of Socialism, we will reach for any means that will be necessary”.
- September 4–12. Major Soviet military exercise Zapad’81 (West’81) takes place in Belarus and the Baltic States.
- September 5–10. First round of National Congress of Solidarity Delegates takes place in Gdańsk, at Hala Olivia. Solidarity has 9,5 million members. Of all its regions, most numerous is Upper Silesia - Zagłębie Dąbrowskie (Region Śląsko-Dąbrowski) - 1,4 mln members, Mazovia - 911,000 members, and Lower Silesia - 900,000 members. During the Congress, The Message to Working People of Eastern Europe is issued, as well as a Letter to Polonia of the Whole World.
- September 13. Government's Committee of Defence of the Nation informs about its readiness to introduce martial law within 48 hours after a political decision.
- September 16. Polish Politburo makes an announcement: “Rowdy tendencies and phenomena have become part of official program of Solidarity Congress. Hence, Solidarity has unilaterally broken the agreements of Gdańsk, Szczecin and Jastrzębie. These agreements have been replaced with a program of political opposition, which aims at interests of the country and the nation, which means confrontation. We will defend Socialism like we defend Poland’s independence. The state will use for this defence all means required by the situation”.
- September 17. High-ranking Communist officials meet with leaders of Polish Church.
- September 17–18. Congress of Rural Solidarity in Wierzchosławice, birthplace of Wincenty Witos. Operation Sasanka (Pulsatilla) - envelopes with martial law documentation are distributed to regional offices of police (Milicja Obywatelska).
- September 25. Activists of independent Milicja Obywatelska trade unions try to occupy sports the arena of Gwardia Warszawa, located at Warsaw's Hale Mirowskie complex.
- September 26 – October 7. Second round of National Congress of Solidarity Delegates takes place in Gdańsk. National Commission of the union is elected, with Lech Wałęsa as a chairman, as well as a Revision Commission. Statute of Solidarity is announced, Workers' Defence Committee is dissolved. In a speech, Wałęsa says, “Solidarity shall not be divided or destroyed”.

=== October ===
- October 4. General Czesław Kiszczak prepares a secret task list for officers of the Ministry of Internal Affairs.
- October 5. Ministry of Internal Affairs creates a list of 7768 trusted individuals, who may be armed in case of martial law.
- October 14–21. A delegation of Solidarity visits France.
- October 16. The Cabinet of Poland decides to prolong compulsory military service by two months.
- October 16–18. IV Plenum of PZPR convenes in Warsaw. After resignation of Stanisław Kania, Wojciech Jaruzelski becomes First Secretary of the party.
- October 19. In a telephone conversation, Leonid Brezhnev congratulates Jaruzelski. The Soviet leader says that it is important to begin the already planned "decisive activities" against "counter-revolution". Jaruzelski thanks for the trust and states that he agreed to become First Secretary, knowing about Soviet support. "I will do everything as a Communist and a soldier, to achieve a breakthrough in the nation and in the party", he adds.
- October 20. Street fights in Katowice, after police officers destroy a stall of a street vendor, selling Solidarity press.
- October 21 - November 4. General strike in Żyrardów, with 12,000 participating. Workers demand improvement in food delivery.
- October 22 - November 13. General strike in Zielona Góra Voivodeship, sparked by a conflict at State Agricultural Farm in a village of Lubogóra, where chairman of local Solidarity had been fired.
- October 23. National Commission of Solidarity declares state of emergency in the union, and urges the nation to participate in a warning strike, scheduled for October 28.
- October 24. Local Military Operational Groups are created by the government.
- October 26. Strike at Technical University of Radom begins, after Michał Hebda is appointed chancellor. The strike lasts for 49 days, until December 13, and is the longest protest of Communist Poland.
- October 27. Inmates protest at a prison in Potulice.
- October 28. One-hour national strike.
- October 29. During a meeting of the Soviet Politburo Yuri Andropov says that intervention in Poland is not planned.
- October 30. Solidarity Presidium states that protests across Poland are chaotic and disorganized, threatening the unity of the union. The Open Letter of Founding Committee of Independent Trade Union of Milicja Obywatelska Officers is published.

=== November ===
- November 3–4. National Coordinating Commission of Solidarity demands creation of Social Council of National Economy, reforms of courts and police, and access to mass-media.
- November 4. In Warsaw, a meeting between Primate Józef Glemp, Prime Minister Wojciech Jaruzelski and Lech Wałęsa takes place. General strike in Żyrardów ends.
- November 5. Farmers from across the nation, gathered in Siedlce, begin strike action. National Committee of Protest Action is created by them, and the farmers demand fulfilment of the Rzeszów-Ustrzyki Agreement.
- November 6. Security forces with armored vehicles and water cannons put an end to a prisoners’ rebellion in Kamieńsk. Two prisoners are killed during the operation.
- November 8. Colonel Ryszard Kukliński is transported out of Poland by the CIA.
- November 10. During a Politburo meeting, Jan Łabącki of PZPR says that in order to break the unity of Solidarity, Lech Wałęsa should be supported by the government, as an alternative to the “radicals”, such as Jan Rulewski, Zbigniew Bujak, and Andrzej Rozpłochowski.
- November 12. Colleges across the country begin protests in support of their colleagues from Radom. General strike in Zielona Góra Voivodeship ends.
- November 17. Talks between the government and Solidarity in Warsaw end in a stalemate.
- November 22. Clubs of Self-Governing Republic "Freedom - Justice - Independence" are founded in Warsaw by Jacek Kuroƒ, Adam Michnik, Jan Lityński, Zbigniew Bujak, Janusz Onyszkiewicz, and others. Their first meeting is broken down by the police.
- November 24. Another meeting of Wojciech Jaruzelski and Marshall Viktor Kulikov (altogether, Jaruzelski and Kulikov met each other 22 times in 1981).
- November 25. A sit-down strike begins at Warsaw's School of Fire Service Officers. Students demand that the school should be governed by civilian, not military authorities.
- November 25–26. VI Plenum of PZPR, during which Wojciech Jaruzelski says, “We have less and less time to stop the course of dangerous events. But we can and must do it”.

=== December ===
- December 1–4. Meeting of Ministers of Defence of the Warsaw Pact nations in Moscow, during which the situation in Poland is discussed.
- December 2. At 10:15 a.m., special police units break down the strike at Warsaw's School of Fire Service Officers. During the operation, helicopters are used and several activists are arrested. Bogusław Stachura of Ministry of Internal Affairs declares state of emergency in his units.
- December 3. National Commission of Solidarity meets in Radom. Radical activists demand a confrontation with the government and a general strike. In a statement, the Commission writes: “Once again the raw truth has been confirmed: who is against socialism, he is against Poland and her security. We are not seeking understanding with such forces”.
- December 3–4. Primate Glemp meets Lech Wałęsa.
- December 4. Members of Solidarity Region Lower Silesia, Józef Pinior and Stanisław Huskowski, withdraw 80 million zlotys from the union account, and deposit the money at Cardinal Henryk Gulbinowicz from Wrocław Metropolitan Curia. During the martial law, the funds are used to help persecuted activists and organize underground structures.
- December 5. During a meeting of Polish Polituro, its members unanimously support the martial law.
- December 7. A group of students, attaching posters on the walls, is arrested in Gliwice.
- December 9. Primate Józef Glemp meets a delegation of Solidarity.
- December 10. National student solidarity strike, in support of the protesters in Radom, comes to an end. A march in defence of political prisoners takes place in Katowice. Solidarity of Upper Silesia - Zaglebie Dabrowskie issues an instruction in case of general strike and arrests of local Solidarity leaders.
- December 11. Congress of Polish Culture begins in Warsaw. Krzysztof Czabański of Tygodnik Solidarność writes in last pre-martial law issue of the magazine: “There may be tanks at intersections, police and military patrols. But a rifle will not replace an economic reform, and will not fill shelves at stores”.
- December 11–12. National Commission of Solidarity meets in Gdańsk, issuing a communiqué: “We can start negotiations with the government at the very moment when the authorities relinquish the use of force against the nation”.
- December 12. Primate's Social Council is created in Warsaw by Józef Glemp. At a morning meeting, organized at Wojciech Jaruzelski's office, all gathered government officials agree that martial law is necessary. At 14:00, General Jaruzelski decides to begin martial law. Two hours later, headquarters of Ministry of Internal Affairs sends an encrypted message to local offices of Milicja Obywatelska. At 18:00, Military Council of National Salvation is created. At 20:00, Solidarity leaders are informed by their sympathizers at Służba Bezpieczeństwa that martial law will be introduced soon. At 23:00 first arrests take place. In the military operation participate 80,000 soldiers, and 30,000 officers of police and security services, together with 1,400 armored vehicles, 1,750 tanks and 9,000 other vehicles. Central Office of Corrections creates a list of 46 prisons in which opposition activists are to be held.
- December 13. At 1:00 a.m. In a special meeting, Polish Council of State approves a number of decrees, which had been previously prepared by military officers, including the martial law decree. Ryszard Reiff is the only member of the Council who votes against them. Solidarity is delegalized, as well as all other organizations, with the exception of the PZPR. All kinds of meetings are banned, except for religious ones. Strikes and protests are banned, as well as publication of materials. Curfew is introduced (from 22:00 to 6:00), schools are closed until January 3, 1982, Polish citizens are banned from traveling abroad. All newspapers are closed, with the exception of Trybuna Ludu and Żołnierz Wolności. Army units seize campuses of Polish Radio and TV (Operation Azalia), TV announcers wear uniforms. Congress of Polish Culture is dissolved, the black market price of the U.S. dollar rises from app. 500 zlotys to 1500 zlotys. All regional offices of Solidarity are occupied by the government forces. In several locations, street clashes take place. Strikes begin in numerous enterprises, and Primate Józef Glemp appeals for calm and order in a sermon at Warsaw's St. John's Archcathedral.
- December 13–28. Protests across Poland. According to the government, around 250 enterprises go on strike on December 13 and 14. Most protests end quickly, after intervention of military commissars and prosecutors. Workers are threatened with imprisonment, in several locations units of ZOMO and Polish Army organize demonstrations of force. Protests are pacified in 40 enterprises (see Pacification of Wujek), and by December 16, there are few isolated points of resistance. Last strike, the 1981 strike at Piast Coal Mine in Bieruń, ends on December 28.

Major strikes of December 1981 took place in the following enterprises:

- University of Łódź (December 13–15)

- Gdańsk Shipyard (December 13–16). Security forces tried to pacify it several times, finally managing to do so. 1,500 workers are fired after the protest.

- PZL-Świdnik (December 13–16). Pacified by the ZOMO in the night of December 15/16. The factory is militarized, 40 people are arrested.

- Wujek Coal Mine in Katowice (December 13–16), see Pacification of Wujek.

- Lenin Steelworks in Nowa Huta (December 13–17). Pacified by the ZOMO in the night of December 16/17.

- Szczecin Shipyard (December 13–18). On December 18, after pacification by the ZOMO, the shipyard was closed for 2 weeks, with 1000 workers dismissed.

- Gdańsk refinery (December 13–18), pacified by the ZOMO.

- Puławy Nitrogen Plant Azoty in Puławy (December 13–19), pacified by the ZOMO.

- Port of Gdańsk (December 13–20). Pacified both by the ZOMO and the Polish Navy units.

- Anna Coal Mine in Pszów (December 13–20), pacified by the ZOMO, with 102 miners remaining underground until December 20.

- Katowice Steelworks in Dąbrowa Górnicza (December 13–23), pacified by the ZOMO and Army units, with tanks and armored personnel carriers.

- Baildon Steelworks in Katowice, pacified by the ZOMO on December 14.

- Halemba Coal Mine in Ruda Śląska, pacified by the ZOMO on December 14.

- Bistona Textile Plant in Łódź, pacified by the Army on December 14.

- Anilana Polanil Textile Plant in Łódź, pacified on December 14.

- Teofilów Textile Plant in Łódź, pacified on December 14.

- Ursus Factory in Warsaw (December 14–15, pacified by the ZOMO, with 60 arrested.

- Manifest Lipcowy Coal Mine in Jastrzębie-Zdrój (December 14–15), pacified by the ZOMO with tanks, 5 miners are wounded.

- Staszic Coal Mine in Katowice (December 14–15), pacified by the ZOMO.

- Stocznia Gdynia (December 14–15), pacified by the ZOMO and Army units.

- Andaluzja Coal Mine in Piekary Śląskie (December 14–17). The strike ended after miners get the news of the massacre at Wujek Coal Mine.

- FSC Lublin (December 14–17), pacified by the ZOMO.

- Pafawag and Dolmel Factories in Wrocław (December 14–19). Both factories, which are situated next to each other, joined forces, under leadership of Władysław Frasyniuk. On December 18 Dolmel is militarized, and the strike ends next day.

- Rolling Bearings Factory in Kraśnik (December 14–18), pacified by the ZOMO.

- Agriculture Machinery Plant Agromed-Archimedes in Wrocław (December 14–19). The strike is pacified by the army and the ZOMO.

- Mera-Elwro in Wrocław (December 14–21). Pacified by the army and the ZOMO.

- Bumar-Fadroma in Wrocław (December 15–18). ZOMO units pacify the enterprise on December 16, but since employees are not willing to work, the factory is shut down on December 18.

- Ziemowit Coal Mine in Tychy (December 15–23). Some 1,400 miners remain underground for several days.

- Piast Coal Mine in Bieruń. See 1981 strike at Piast Coal Mine in Bieruń.

- December 14. TASS states that all steps undertaken by Poland are her internal affair. In Warsaw, Primate's Committee to Help the Detained and Their Families is created by Józef Glemp. In the following months, regional offices of the committee are created in 36 other locations. First issue of underground Solidarity magazine “Z dnia na dzień” comes out in Wrocław.
- December 14–15. Rallies at Warsaw University, Wrocław University of Technology and Warsaw University of Technology.
- December 15. Committee for Social Resistance is created in Warsaw. First Solidarity samizdats come out in Poznań and Szczecin.
- December 16. At the Vatican, Pope John Paul II issues an appeal to his fellow Poles. Street demonstrations in Warsaw, Łódź, Gdańsk (where army units refuse to attack the crowd) and Pabianice. First patrols of “Civilian Help”, militarized units of PZPR members, appear on streets. Military Council of National Salvation orders the arrest of 32 former leaders of PZPR, including Edward Gierek and Edward Babiuch.
- December 17. Street fights continue in Gdańsk, in which 30,000 participate. ZOMO units use weapons. Altogether, almost 400 are wounded. Demonstrations and street fights also take place in Łódź, Kraków's Main Market Square, Szczecin and Warsaw. First issue of News Bulletin of Mazovia Solidarity comes out in Warsaw. In Jastrzębie-Zdrój, Committee of Solidarity Defence is created. Trybuna Ludu publishes a list of detained Solidarity activists. Radio France Internationale begins daily Polish-language news broadcasts. Ronald Reagan states that it is impossible to continue to provide economic help for Poland.
- December 18. Pope John Paul II writes a letter to Wojciech Jaruzelski, urging him to cease activities which result in the shedding of Polish blood. American and Western European trade unions organize mass demonstrations in support of Solidarity and the Polish nation.
- December 19. General Roman Paszkowski, military commissar of Katowice admits that the situation in the region is tense. Leaders of the Eastern Bloc nations gather in Moscow to celebrate 75th birthday of Leonid Brezhnev. Polish leaders do not attend the event.
- December 20. Romuald Spasowski, Poland's ambassador to the United States, requests political asylum. Papal envoy, Cardinal Luigi Poggi, comes to Warsaw. The government bans all sales of paints, solvents and lacquer, also imposes limits on sales of paper and notebooks, to prevent production of samizdat publications. According to a secret document of Ministry of Internal Affairs, some 80,000 soldiers with 1,200 tanks took part in Operation Jodła - the introduction of the martial law.
- December 21. Kurt Waldheim appeals for respect of human rights in Poland. Following the appeal of trade unions, French workers lay down their tools for one hour, in support of Poland (French Communist trade unions do not join the protest). A rally in support of Poland takes place at London's Hyde Park (see Polish Solidarity Campaign).
- December 23. Strikes at Katowice Steelworks and Ziemowit Coal Mine end. President Ronald Reagan declares economic sanctions against Poland.
- December 24. The curfew is suspended for the Christmas Eve night, to enable the faithful to attend the pasterka. Wojciech Jaruzelski announces that there still is a chance to reach national agreement, adding that martial law will last “as long as it is necessary, but not a single hour longer”. In Polkowice, an attempt to set fire to a PZPR office takes place.
- December 25. Pope John Paul II meets 50,000 faithful at Saint Peter's Square, sending wishes to Poles. Six Polish fishermen ask for asylum along the shores of Alaska, as well as 16 sailors in Japan.
- December 26. Zdzisław Rurarz, Poland's ambassador to Japan, requests political asylum.
- December 27. Cardinal Luigi Poggi returns to the Vatican. Lech Wałęsa is named 1981 Time Person of the Year.
- December 28. Strike at Piast Coal Mine ends. The government announces reduction in the rationing of meat and meat products. Farmers with farms larger than 0.5 hectares (1.2 acres) are not entitled to any meats and butter,
- December 30. Provincial Court in Łódź sentences Solidarity activists Andrzej Słowik and Jerzy Kropiwnicki to 4,5 years in prison. Military Council of National Salvation introduces work duty for all males aged 18–45.
- December 31. The curfew is suspended for one night. Air traffic between Poland and the USA is suspended.
