= List of strikes in Poland =

Throughout the history of Poland, a number of strikes and labour disputes have occurred.

== Background ==
A labour strike is a work stoppage caused by the mass refusal of employees to work. This can include wildcat strikes, which are done without union authorisation, and slowdown strikes, where workers reduce their productivity while still carrying out minimal working duties. It is usually a response to employee grievances, such as low pay or poor working conditions. Strikes can also occur to demonstrate solidarity with workers in other workplaces or pressure governments to change policies.

== 19th century ==
=== 1890s ===
- Łódź rebellion, in Congress Poland in 1892, for an eight-hour working day, an increase in wages, and political freedoms.

== 20th century ==
=== 1900s ===
- Września children strike, strike by schoolchildren in the Province of Posen from 1901 to 1904 against Germanisation of schools.
- Łódź insurrection, in Congress Poland, part of the Revolution in the Kingdom of Poland (1905–1907).

=== 1910s ===
- First Silesian Uprising, in 1919, including strikes, against German occupation of Upper Silesia.

=== 1920s ===
- 1923 Kraków riot, riot during a strike in Kraków against militarisation of railways.
- 1928 Łódź general strike

=== 1930s ===
- 1933 Łódź textile strike
- One-day general strike by the Jewish community in 1936 following the Przytyk pogrom.
- 1937 peasant strike in Poland, the largest protest in the Second Polish Republic.
- 1939 Polish Jews meat strike, 16-day strike by Jewish butchers and meatpackers in German-occupied Poland against a law banning shechita.

=== 1940s ===
- 1947 Łódź textile strike, strike by textile workers in Łódź, Polish People's Republic.

=== 1950s ===
- 1956 Poznań protests, including strikes, against the dictatorship of the Polish United Workers' Party.
- 1957 Łódź tram drivers' strike, pl, strike by tram drivers in Łódź over wages.

=== 1960s ===
- 1968 Polish political crisis, including student strikes, against the dictatorship of the Polish United Workers' Party.

=== 1970s ===
- 1970 Polish protests, including strikes, over food price increases.
- 1971 Łódź strikes, strike by textile workers in Łódź against food price increases.
- June 1976 protests, including strikes, against food price increases.

=== 1980s ===
- 1980 Lublin strikes, series of strikes in Lublin over wages and against food price increases.
- Upper Silesia 1980 strikes, series of strikes in Upper Silesia for legalisation of independent trade unions.
- 1981 general strike in Bielsko-Biała, general strike in Bielsko-Biała against corruption.
- 1981 strike at the Piast Coal Mine in Bieruń, strike by Piast Coal Mine miners against martial law.
- 1981 University of Łódź strike, strike by students at the University of Łódź demanding recognition of the Independent Students' Association.
- 1981 warning strike in Poland, part of the Bydgoszcz events.
- 1988 Polish strikes, mass wave of strikes in the Polish People's Republic.

=== 1990s ===
- 1991 Polish air traffic controllers strike, strike by air traffic controllers over wages.
- 1992–93 Polish miners' strike, 20-day strike by coal miners against layoffs, part of the 1992–93 Polish strikes.
- 1992–93 Polish strikes, mass wave of strikes in the Third Polish Republic.
- 1993 Polish teachers' strike, strike by teachers over wages and financial support for education.

== 21st century ==
=== 2000s ===
- 2007 Kielce bus strike, strike by bus drivers in Kielce against privatisation.

=== 2010s ===
- 2019 Polish teachers' strike, 3-week strike by teachers over wages.

=== 2020s ===
- 2020–2021 women's strike protests in Poland, for abortion rights, part of the Polish constitutional crisis.
- Media Without Choice, in 2021.
- 2024 Polish farmers' protests, part of the 2023–2024 European Union farmers' protests.

== See also ==
- All-Poland Women's Strike
- History of Solidarity
