= Pacification of Wujek =

1981 massacre in Poland

- Part of Martial law in Poland
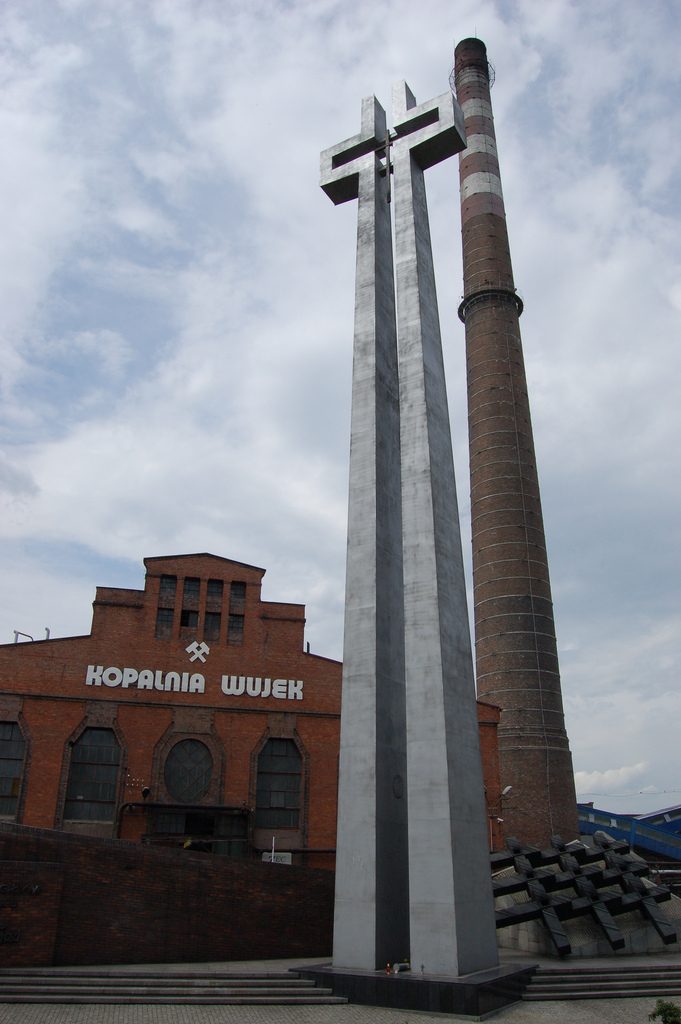
- The Wujek massacre memorial
- Type: Shooting
- Location: Wujek Coal Mine; 50°14′41″N 18°59′17″E
- Objective: Crackdown on the strike
- Date: 16 December 1981
- Executed by: ZOMO; Polish People's Army
- Casualties: 9 miners killed

The Pacification of Wujek was a strike-breaking action by the Polish police and army at the Wujek Coal Mine in Katowice, Poland, culminating in the massacre of nine striking miners on December 16, 1981.

It was part of a large-scale action aimed to break the Solidarity free trade union after the introduction of martial law in Poland in 1981. Although the strike was suppressed, in a longer term, it turned out to be a milestone towards the collapse of the authoritarian system in Poland and, ultimately, to the collapse of the Eastern Bloc. It was a site of numerous protests, including by Solidarity activist Anna Walentynowicz who commemorated a plaque to the murdered miners shortly after she left prison at Gołdap.

== Strike ==
Following the declaration of martial law in Poland on the night of 12–13 December, the chairman of Solidarity's factory commission, Jan Ludwiczak, was arrested alongside hundreds of other activists. Milicja Obywatelska officers broke down the door of his apartment and assaulted the miners that attempted to rescue him.

On the morning of 14 December, the miners refused to work until three stipulations were met: the release of Ludwiczak, the release of all other Solidarity activists, and the lifting of martial law. They barricaded themselves inside the mine and were given food and support by townspeople, friends, and family.

== Massacre ==
On 15 December, a ZOMO special platoon opened fire on striking miners at the Manifest Lipcowy Coal Mine in Jastrzębie-Zdrój, injuring four and ending the strike. ZOMO had previously attempted to enter the mine twice, but were repelled by the miners.

On December 16, three days after the introduction of the martial law in Poland, pro-Solidarity miners striking against the declaration of the martial law by General Wojciech Jaruzelski were dispersed by the troops of the Polish army and police. The forces used in the main thrust against the miners consisted of eight companies of riot police (ZOMO, supported by ORMO (police reservists) and NOMO) with seven water cannons, three companies of military with 44 infantry fighting vehicles (IFVs) and one armoured company with 22 T-55 tanks. The operation involved a total of 1471 agents and 760 soldiers. The first assault was spearheaded by IFVs and even tanks that tear down the compound fence. The government forces used the water cannons, tear gas grenades and firecrackers, The miners repeatedly fought them off with their tools. One tank became stuck in a barricade, and the troops were forced to wear gas masks when the wind brought the tear gas to their direction, The miners threw bars and bolts on the riot police, who withdrew, exception made of three troopers that were retained by the workers. During the brawl a number of strikers and 41 troops were injured, including 11 severely.

Four companies of ZOMO eventually entered the mine from two directions, supported by a T-55 that broke down a barricade made of wagons and tubes. A helicopter dropped tear gas on the workers. A special platoon of ZOMO opened fire at the strikers with submachine guns, killing nine of them (Jan Stawisiński, Joachim Gnida, Józef Czekalski, Krzysztof Giza, Ryszard Gzik, Bogusław Kopczak, Andrzej Pełka, Zbigniew Wilk and Zenon Zając) and wounding 23 others. One of the deaths took place after 20 or more days in hospital with severe head-wounds.

== Aftermath ==
The repressions after the pacification included sentencing of three miners to jail terms of three to four years in prison.

On June 1, 2007, more than two decades after the incident, 15 former members of the special platoon were sentenced to prison terms for their part in the killings. Most of them were sentenced to terms of 2.5 to three years in prison, except their former platoon commander, Romuald Cieślak, who was sentenced to 11 years in prison. The court however failed to establish who sent the special platoon to Wujek (and thus acquitted the former vice-chief of communist police in Katowice, Marian Okrutny).

Multiple Communist newspapers, such as Morning Star and l'Unità, condemned the massacre. The Communist Party of Spain claimed that the Polish government was attempting to establish a "military regime". C.H. Hermansson, the former leader of the Left Party, said that Sweden should cut ties with the Polish United Workers' Party in response to their violent strike-breaking actions.

As a result of the massacre, US President Ronald Reagan introduced sanctions against the Polish People's Republic.

In 2015, the murdered miners were awarded the Cross of Freedom and Solidarity.

== Popular culture ==
- The tragedy was portrayed in the 1994 feature film Śmierć jak kromka chleba (Death like daily bread) by Kazimierz Kutz and the 2006 graphic novel 1981: Kopalnia Wujek.

== See also ==
- 1981 warning strike in Poland
- August 31, 1982 demonstrations in Poland
- 1988 Polish strikes
- History of Solidarity
- Jastrzebie-Zdroj 1980 strikes
- Lublin 1980 strikes
- Summer 1981 hunger demonstrations in Poland
- 1981 strike at Piast Coal Mine in Bieruń
