= Piast (disambiguation) =

Piast may refer to:

== Buildings and organisations ==
- Piast Brewery, a defunct brewery, located in Wrocław
- Piast Canal, a canal that connects the Oder Lagoon with the Baltic Sea
- Piast's Castle, castle in Gliwice
- Piast Coal Mine
  - See also: 1981 strike at the Piast Coal Mine in Bieruń
- Piast Institute, a national research and policy center for Polish and Polish-American affairs based in Hamtramck, Michigan
- Stadion Piast, the stadium of Piast Gliwice

== History ==
- Piast dynasty, the first historical ruling dynasty of Poland
- Piast the Wheelwright, founder of the Piast dynasty
- Silesian Piast dynasty, rulers of the Duchies of Silesia, which resulted from numerous divisions of the original Duchy of Silesia established in 1138 under the Silesian Piasts
- Ziemowit Piast, son of Piast the Wheelwright

== Politics ==
- Chjeno-Piast, an unofficial (yet common) name of a past coalition of Polish political parties formed in 1923
- Piast Concept, a political idea of Polish state based on its initial territories under the Piast dynasty
- Polish People's Party "Piast" (1913–31), a former political party in Poland
- Polish People's Party "Piast" (founded 2006), a political party in Poland

== Sports teams ==
- Piast Cieszyn
- Piast Chęciny
- Piast Gliwice
- Piast Nowa Ruda

== Other ==
- Piast Eagle, coat of arms of Poland
- Piast, a beer brewed by the Okocim Brewery, previously by the Piast Brewery
- PIAST (Satellites), a constellation of satellites created by POLSA
