= Rural Solidarity =

Polish farmers' trade union

- Independent Self-Governing Trade Union of Individual Farmers "Solidarity"
- Niezależny Samorządny Związek Zawodowy Rolników Indywidualnych "Solidarność"
- Formation: 1980 (Created); 12 May 1981 (Legalized)
- Type: Trade union center
- Location: Poland
- President: Tomasz Obszański
- Secretary: Łukasz Zbonikowski
- Affiliations: Solidarity
- Website: www.solidarnoscri.pl

Rural Solidarity (full name Independent Self-governing Trade Union of Individual Farmers "Solidarity") is a trade union of Polish farmers, established in late 1980 as part of the growing Solidarity movement. Its legalization became possible on February 19, 1981, when officials of the government of the People's Republic of Poland signed the so-called Rzeszów - Ustrzyki Dolne Agreement with striking farmers. Previously, Communist government had refused farmers' right to self-organize, which caused widespread strikes, with the biggest wave taking place in January 1981. The Rural Solidarity was officially recognized on May 12, 1981, and, strongly backed by the Catholic Church of Poland, it claimed to represent at least half of Poland's 3.2 million smallholders.

== Background ==
After World War II, Poland became a communist country, a satellite of the Soviet Union. Since collective farming is a key component of communist notion of agriculture, in June 1948, the Polish United Workers' Party decided to begin the process. From the very beginning, compulsory collectivization faced strong resistance of Polish farmers, who did not want to give up their land. Despite using different methods of persuasion, the progress was slow. By 1951, only 1% of arable land was collectivized, with some 23 000 farmers working there. Altogether, in that year there were some 2200 collective farms. Most of them were located in western and northern Poland, in the Recovered Territories, where population consisted of people resettled from former eastern borderlands of Poland.

After the Polish October, Władysław Gomułka officially declared that private farms were part of the so-called "Polish road to Socialism" and the government gradually changed its stance. In the late 1950s, number of collective farms fell to 1 800, and Poland was the only country of the Soviet Bloc which tolerated private ownership of the arable land. In 1958, Moscow ordered the resumption of collectivization, but unlike her neighbors, Poland refused. By 1960, collectivization in Poland was ended, never to be resumed, and Engels' opinion that peasants would spontaneously create collective forms of agricultural production because of the threat of the big landed estates was not confirmed in Poland.

Preservation of individual agriculture was a key factor in future events. Nevertheless, forced collectivization of farmland had disastrous consequences, as Poland, traditionally a grain exporter, had to import food, including grain, to prevent famine.

== Origins of the Rural Solidarity ==
In August 1980, workers of the Vladimir Lenin Gdańsk Shipyard began a strike, which resulted in creation of Solidarity (see: History of Solidarity). After this event, a group of farmers, gathered in the Farmers Self-Defence Committees decided to set up their own, parallel union called Rural Solidarity. At that time, other similar farmers organizations emerged, such as Peasants Solidarity and Union of Agricultural Producers Solidarity. Their objectives were:

- recognition of private farming as a lasting part of the national economy,
- legal protection of inheritance of land.

On September 24, 1980, representatives of Polish individual farmers submitted documents to the Warsaw Provincial Court for registration as Rural Solidarity. However, after one month, at the end of October, the court ruled that private farmers were self-employed and as such, were not entitled to organize their own labor union. The disappointed farmers turned to the Supreme Court.

On November 30, Deputy Minister of Agriculture Andrzej Kacala met with a group of 30 representatives of farmers' unions founding committees from the Warsaw, Lublin, Siedlce, Skierniewice, and Wałbrzych Voivodeships, as well as from the Września–Konin, Golub-Dobrzyń–Kujawy, and the Holy Cross Mountains regions. The representatives informally called themselves Rural Solidarity.

Supported by Lech Wałęsa and the factory workers, the farmers organized on December 14, 1980, the founding congress of Rural Solidarity in Warsaw. It was attended by 1000 delegates, who represented around 600 000 private farmers. Among their demands, there was a call for formal registration of their independent union. However, on December 30, 1980, the Supreme Court announced that its ruling on Rural Solidarity had been postponed. As a result, tensions rose rise between the peasants and local governments across the country.

== Creation of the organization ==
Southeastern part of Poland was the area in which individual farmers were very numerous and where position of the Roman Catholic Church was the strongest. Therefore, in early 1981, main center of farmers' protests was established in the city of Rzeszów, where the strike and the sit-in began on January 5, 1981, and where the center of the movement was established. As Time magazine reported on Monday, February 2, 1981, members of Solidarity and Rural Solidarity occupied "Headquarters of the old official trade union" (in fact, it was The House of the Railroad Worker), where they placed a sign which said: "SOLIDARITY IS MORE THAN JUST A NAME". The united front of both organizations demanded negotiations toward legitimizing the farmers' union.

Other centers of farmers protests were also located in southeastern Poland, in the towns of Ustrzyki Dolne and Nowy Sącz, but Solidarity members had been evicted from occupied buildings there. It must be noticed that the Solidarity trade union, and its leaders, such as Lech Wałęsa, fully supported demands of it the peasants. As one Solidarity official said, "We got in touch with our people in all of the major factories around here and let them know that if the police interfered here there would be a general strike without further notice".

== Rzeszów-Ustrzyki Agreement ==
At the beginning of 1981, peasants striking in Rzeszów joined forces with their comrades from Ustrzyki Dolne, who had been on strike since December 28, 1980, occupying the local government office. The strike in Ustrzyki became known across the country. In different locations in Poland, several strikes broke out (including a hunger strike in Świdnica), and on February 18, 1981, negotiations began. The peasants were helped by such personalities, as Lech Wałęsa, Andrzej Gwiazda, Andrzej Stelmachowski and Jadwiga Staniszkis. Also, among supporters of the peasants, was Primate Stefan Wyszyński, who on February 6, 1981, confirmed "the right of the farmers to found freely their own associations".

The Rzeszów-Ustrzyki Agreement was signed in the night of February 18/19 (in Ustrzyki) and February 20 (in Rzeszów). The government, represented by Minister of Agriculture Andrzej Kacala, did not give permission to creation of a free trade union of the peasants, but legal protection of inheritance of land was confirmed. Other concessions included permission to construct more churches in the countryside and promise of equal treatment of individual farmers. Another concession won by the farmers was the government's promise to reduce its "pleasure lands" and reduce the number of facilities selling alcohol. Nevertheless, the state refused to register the organization, stating that the farmers were not wage earners and therefore could not be unionized.

The Agreement was signed by Minister Kacala, who represented the Government, and Jozef Slisz, Jan Kulaj, Antoni Kopaczewski, Bogdan Lis and Lech Wałęsa. Due to its significance, it is sometimes called the "Constitution of the Polish Countryside".

== Legalization of Rural Solidarity ==
However, Rural Solidarity was not legalized until May 12, 1981, after another farmers strike, this time in Bydgoszcz, where it resulted in a major incident, which sparked off the 1981 warning strike in Poland. Its first leader became Jan Kułaj, and the union was banned on December 13, 1981 (see: Martial Law in Poland). Among those who supported restoration of the Rural Solidarity, was Pope John Paul II, who called for it during his 1987 visit to Poland, saying: "A Pope cannot remain quiet about this even if he were not a Pole".

Rural Solidarity returned in 1989 (see: Polish Round Table Agreement), and has existed since then. Among its leaders, there are Gabriel Janowski, Artur Balazs, Roman Bartoszcze, and Roman Wierzbicki.

Solidarity is still an active union and is currently the "largest employee organization in Poland," with an estimated 900,000 members in nearly 12,000 organized work committees. The National Delegate Assembly, governing body, holds annual assemblies as well: The National Commission and The National Audit Committee. The President of the National Commission is Piotr Duda. Solidarity also has an online website where they have a "trade union and employee magazine" that is published weekly. The magazine is called Tygodnik Solidarność and, from a 2007 study conducted at the National Congress of Delegates in Legnica, it was found that as much as "90 percent [of] trade unionists get information about Solidarity from Tygodnik."

== Activities and Protests (2004 - 2016) ==
Following Poland joining the European Union May 1 of 2004, land became purchasable by non-Polish citizens. Many farmers in Poland rely on leasing land "in order to raise income levels" as the cost to purchase is often too high for them, with some of the "smallest farms hav[ing] an equal share of own[ed] and leased land." Smaller farms sized 10.1 to 15.0 ha leased 25.24% of their land, 30.1 to 50.0 ha leased 34.20%, 50.1 to 100.0 ha leased 38.27%, and 300.1 to 500.0 ha sized farms leased 59.44%. Due to the cost, many citizens "vehemently opposed" Polish agricultural land that was owned by the state, and being leased to farmers, becoming purchasable, as Poland's agricultural land is overall valued less than land from other EU countries, with one hectare of arable land in Poland being €5,000 on the low end and €15,000 on the higher end, while countries like the Netherlands averaging €69,632 per hectare of land as of 2019. Farmers and citizens also "recognise[d] that national food security is dangerously undermined by such sales. Keeping agricultural land in perpetuity for future generations is critically important for the food security of the nation as well as for the health and welfare of its citizens." In order to prevent this from happening, non-Polish citizens were required to have a permit in order to purchase land. Foreign companies were still able to acquire land through the use of "substitute buyers," Polish citizens that purchase and then hand over the land to foreign companies.

Farmers opposed the sale of leasable land and began protesting from the 5th of December 2012 onwards, with Solidarity spearheading the movement stating that "In the times of Communism, 70% of land was State owned. Just 20 years later and Polish farmers cannot buy land anymore. Most of it has landed in the hands of foreigners – mainly Danes and Americans." Protesters blocked roads with "Rallies and blockades [had] taken place in over 50 locations across the country involving thousands of small and family farmers," and government ministries were picketed.

On February 19, 2015, in Warsaw, Solidarity was joined by community groups, local protest committees, regional and national unions such as the union for beekeepers, coal miners and nurses on strike at the time. Protesters blocked the Agricultural Property Agency as well as set up encampments "outside the prime minister's palace and ha[d] vowed to remain until their demands [were] met." A combined total of 6,000 protesters were in attendance, making it "the single largest farmers protest to have ever taken place in Poland." Furthermore, 50 other locations were also being occupied by protesters, with 150 tractors blockading roads. The goal of the protesters' were to push for more legislation that addressed the following concerns on...

1. Land grabs by Western companies as from 2016 onwards, foreign buyers would legally be able to buy Polish land directly.
2. The legalization of direct sale of farm produce, as well as the loosening of laws around farm processed food products.
3. Ban the use of Genetically Modified Organisms in Poland.
4. Regulation in order to ensure farmers are compensated for losses experienced due to government and EU "negligent policies towards quotas, control of wild animals and trade embargoes.

At the February 19th protest, Jadwiga Lopata, a family farmer and the co-director of the International Coalition to Protect the Polish Countryside (ICPPC), said during an interview that "welfare of the nation depends on consumers and farmers having access to traditional seeds and good quality food. The Polish government does not accept this and is destroying the roots of Polish agriculture by listening to corporations rather than Polish people." Family farmers Maria and Mariusz Nowak from Zachodniopomorskie shared a similar sentiment stating that, "We should withdraw our membership of the European Union and recover our national food self-sufficiency [food sovereignty]. It is crazy that we import products we can produce here – Our products are better quality and are healthier. The government is undermining Polish farmers and needs to resign!" Food sovereignty was something also addressed at the movement, which would be more easily obtainable through access to land. The legalization of the direct sale, as well as the softened laws and regulations surrounding farm processed goods, would also affect food sovereignty. Farmers were arrested during the protests, with some facing the possibility of "five-TEN years imprisonment."

On October 25, 2015, general elections were held and on the 27th of October it was announced that the Law and Justice party won with a majority vote of 37.585, and 242 seats. The state election authority in Poland also announced that they had won "235 seats in the 460-seat lower house of Poland's parliament, meaning it has a majority and can govern alone." The party is right-wing with "Catholic conservative morality." The party had garnered support due to their plan to implement "higher taxes on large corporations and banks while doing more to help smaller Polish businesses and families, such as monthly family cash bonuses for children and free medication for people aged over 75." The Law and Justice party was also "responding positively to the [farmers] campaign and adopt[ed] key elements of its agenda." The party also "recogni[zed] food sovereignty as a fundamental citizen's right." Upon the party being elected, the farmers imprisoned were also immediately released without charge.

With the assistance of the International Coalition to Protect the Polish Countryside (ICPPC), their chairman, farmers and other political movement groups such as the Kukiz'15, as well as parliament, work began on the new Food Act "that [would] spell out farmer friendly' supply and demand conditions that are critical to the survival of family farming traditions in Poland."

In an interview in March 2016, Krzysztof Jurgiel, Poland's minister of agriculture, stated that "Land is a national good, and it should be in family farms, for the most part cultivated or managed by Poles and Polish farmers." Later in April of the same year, the government announced a new law that would make it harder to use the previously mentioned workarounds, to purchase land in Poland. However, a new issue arose due to EU "rules forbid[ding] national discrimination," and as such it forces "the new law to include tough restrictions on [all] land sales and ownership, which make it difficult for most Poles, as well as foreigners, to buy farmland." The intent of the new law was, as speculated by a Polityka Insight analyst, Piotr Semeniuk, "to keep the current structure of Polish farming, with mainly fairly small family farms."

Rural Solidarity endorsed Karol Nawrocki the Law and Justice (PiS) candidate for the 2025 Polish presidential election. He would win the election.

== See also ==
- Cold War
- Soviet Empire
- Poznań 1956 protests
- Polish 1970 protests
- Lublin 1980 strikes
