= 1971 Łódź strikes =

Workers' strike in the Polish People's Republic

On February 10, 1971, textile workers in the central Polish city of Łódź (known as "Poland's Manchester") began a strike action, in which the majority of participants were women. These events have been largely forgotten because a few weeks earlier, major protests and street fights had taken place in the cities of northern Poland. Nevertheless, the women of Łódź achieved what shipyard workers of the Baltic Sea coast failed to achieve - cancellation of the increase in food prices, which had been introduced by the government of Communist Poland in December 1970. Consequently, it was the only industrial action in pre-1980 Communist Poland that ended as a success.

== Background ==
The communist government announced increases in food prices on December 12, 1970. For example the prices for meat products were raised by up to 100 percent. Strikes and street demonstrations took place in the Baltic ports of Gdańsk, Gdynia, Szczecin, and Elbląg. Security forces, together with units of the Polish Army massacred at least 42 protesting workers in December. More than 1,000 people were wounded. The news of these events quickly reached Łódź in spite of the government's censorship and media blackout. A tense atmosphere was palpable in the city which was the Polish center of the textile industry, where majority of workers were female. As informants of Communist secret services reported, employees of main factories talked among each other about high prices of food, desperate living conditions, and low wages. Some brought up the possibility of a strike, but in December 1970 no open protests took place. This was due to two factors - the recent news of the bloodbath in the coastal cities, and the change in the Politburo of the Polish United Workers' Party, where on December 20, Edward Gierek was nominated as secretary general. Nevertheless, the government did not back out of the food price increase.

In January 1971, the situation in Łódź became even more tense. The government and the Communist Party were openly criticized, and workers in city’s textile factories talked among themselves that changes in the Polish Politburo were not enough, and that these did not guarantee that bloody events of the December 1970 protests would not be repeated in the future. Agents of the security services reported that Łódź workers frequently mentioned a strike - a term, which according to official propaganda was not supposed to even exist in Communist countries. Local authorities secured key buildings of the city, including the headquarters of the Communist Party, which was guarded by 70 officers of Milicja Obywatelska, 70 soldiers, and 50 officers of the paramilitary police ORMO. The streets of Łódź were patrolled by 1400 police officers, several hundred people were preventively arrested, and a special plan for a blockade of main streets was drawn up. Beginning in mid-December 1970, leaflets were distributed among the population, stating: "Workers! Women of Łódź! Youth of Łódź! We urge you to keep your cool, peace and discipline! Disorganization of your life will damage your interests! Only work, peace and order will help you to overcome current difficulties!".

== Strikes of February 1971 ==
First strikes in Łódź began on February 10, 1971, and despite extensive preparations, the local government was caught by surprise. Łódź was regarded in Poland as a city of women - 77% of its female residents were employed full-time. The majority of workers in the local textile industry were women, and their work was very hard, with antiquated machines (40% of all machinery was built before World War II, further 20% - before World War I.), dilapidated buildings, poor health service, little rest, three shifts, high temperature, noise, and low salaries. Women were discriminated against, they had little chance of promotion, and their supervisors were almost exclusively males, who frequently humiliated them. In 1971, salaries in Łódź were 20% lower than the salaries in Polish heavy industry, so the increase in food prices, announced in December 1970, affected local workers to a larger degree than blue-collar laborers elsewhere.

On the first day of the strike work stoppages were recorded in two major plants - Julian Marchlewski Cotton Works (which at that time employed 9,000 people), and Shoe and Rubber Factory Stomil. In Marchlewski, the strike was initiated around midday by some 400 workers, while in Stomil, 180 laborers stopped their machines. One of the reasons which precipitated the action was a TV interview with shipyard workers from the Baltic Coast, who said that as a result of their protests they had been granted a 25% pay rise.

Even though official mass-media did not mention the protests, on February 12 and 13, further cotton plants joined the strike. These were: Defenders of Peace, First of May, People's Army, General Walter, Kunicki and Hanki Sawickiej. Altogether, some 12,000 workers laid down their tools, 80% of them women. Their demands were simple - wage increases and a return to the pre-December 12, 1970, food prices. Local authorities tried to negotiate, telling the strikers that their demands were impossible to meet but the talks were fruitless. On Sunday, February 14, the atmosphere at Marchlewski was very strained. Workers demanded that First Secretary of the Party, Edward Gierek, come to their factory. However, instead of the number one person in Poland, in late evening on that day a delegation from Warsaw came to Łódź, headed by Prime Minister Piotr Jaroszewicz. Negotiations lasted well into the night. When Jaroszewicz and his people tried to talk the women into going back to work, they answered with dramatic speeches; some cried.

I am afraid, as I want to get back home safely, but there are so many things to do. I go to a butcher’s with 100 zlotys, I buy half a kilogram of meat, some blood sausage and my money is gone. When I am exhausted, I go to our factory doctor, but the supervisor calls him before I get to his office and tells the doctor not to let me go home, because they need people to work the machines.
- said one woman from Marchlewski Works.

I paid my rent, I paid for the kindergarten, and I do not have enough money left to buy a candy for my child. Our kids eat black bread, while your wife eats sandwiches.
- said a female worker of Defenders of Peace Cotton Plant.

Another woman from Marchlewski, angry at the words Włodzimierz Kruczek of official trades unions, pulled down her pants and showed him her buttocks. At one point, Jaroszewicz said: "I want to send you sincere worker's greetings from comrade Gierek. Trust us, help us!" In response, he heard: "We have got the greetings, but we have got no money".

The strikes reached their peak on February 15. The workers had acted spontaneously, without creating any formal committees. There were some loosely organized groups of activists who negotiated with authorities. Only at the Marchlewski plant an unofficial strike council was created, with 26 members. Negotiations with Jaroszewicz did not lead to an agreement, but according to the reports, a visit to Łódź and an inquiry into the living conditions there was a shock to the Communist officials (Jaroszewicz himself admitted that he did not know that the situation was so bad.). Meanwhile, the strike spread. On Monday, February 15, three other factories joined the protest, and the number of strikers grew to 55,000. Unlike the events of December 1970, Łódź workers did not go out onto the streets, and decided to remain in their factories, so no street fights took place. Female employees used a powerful argument while negotiating with the authorities - they frequently mentioned their children and the inability to feed and clothe them properly. In one instance, there was an attempt to barricade streets around the Marchlewski plant. 500 - 1000 people gathered there, stopped the traffic, and overturned dumpsters as well as benches. Some skirmishes with the police ensued, and soon afterwards, fighting moved to Piotrkowska Street. The police attacked the protesters with water cannons, batons and tear gas, arresting 30 people. Otherwise, crews of factories tried to keep order, checking all the people who entered through the gates.

== Aftermath ==
After Jaroszewicz’s visit and a subsequent meeting of the Politburo, on February 15, 1971, the government decided to cancel the increase in food prices, which came into effect on March 1, 1971. Upon hearing of this decision most of the strikes in Łódź ended. Still, workers were distrustful of the government, demanding written confirmation of the decision. Finally, all strikes ended on the morning of February 17, with the two last textile plants – Defenders of Peace, and Feliks Dzierżyński returning to work. After the end of the strikes, the authorities tried to find and punish the leaders. By March 5, 1971, 26 workers of the Marchlewski, and 11 of the Defenders of Peace were identified and forced to quit. Furthermore, Communist leaders were incensed to find out that the workers of Marchlewski collected money for a commemorative flag, with the inscription: Thank you, Holy Mother, for your protection on February 10–15, 1971. The flag is now kept at Saint Joseph church in Łódź.

== See also ==
- Poznań 1956 protests
- Polish 1970 protests
- June 1976 protests
- Jastrzębie-Zdrój 1980 strikes
- Lublin 1980 strikes
- 1981 general strike in Bielsko-Biała
