= 1981 strike at the Piast Coal Mine in Bieruń =

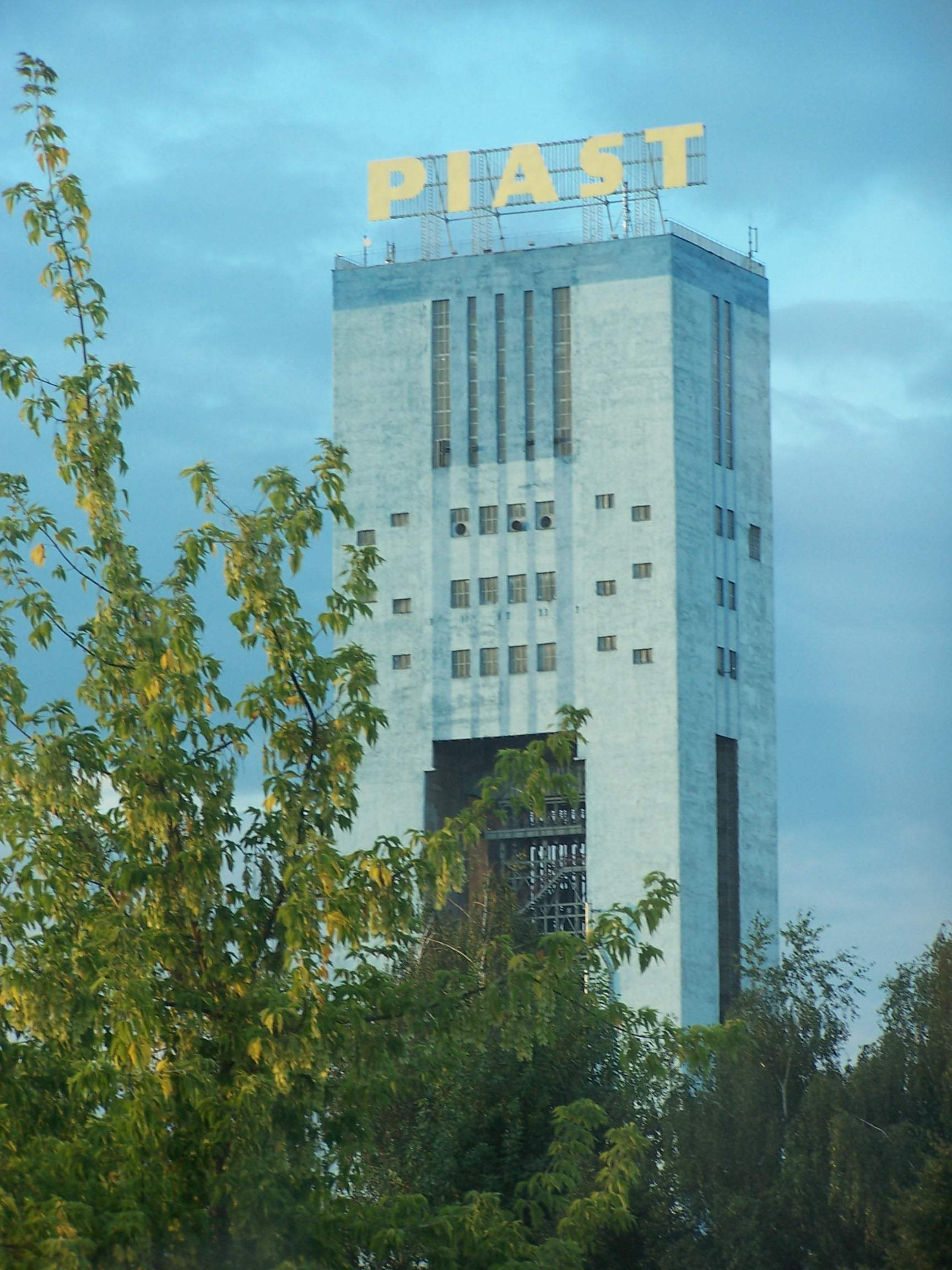
The Piast Coal Mine in Bieruń

The 1981 strike at the Piast Coal Mine in Bieruń was the longest underground protest in the postwar history of Polish mining, and the longest strike of the martial law in Poland. It began on December 14, 1981, one day after introduction of the martial law, and ended on December 28, when approximately 1,000 protesting miners emerged from the mine. They spent two weeks underground, including Christmas, and ended the protest after the government guaranteed their safety.

== Background ==
On December 13, 1981, the government of the People's Republic of Poland introduced martial law, in order to suppress political opposition, mainly the Solidarity movement. This decision was met with resistance from workers in enterprises across the country. Most major Polish factories went on strike, such as Katowice Steelworks, Gdańsk Shipyard, Szczecin Shipyard, Huta Stalowa Wola, Vladimir Lenin Steelworks, and Ursus Factory. The workers demanded the end of the martial law and the release of imprisoned Solidarity leaders.

Industrial actions also took place in several coal mines in Upper Silesia, where an attack against the workers occurred at Wujek Coal Mine in Katowice (see Pacification of Wujek). Altogether, after the introduction of the martial law, 50 Upper Silesian enterprises went on strike, including 25 coal mines. The Piast Coal Mine, located in the town of Bieruń, was one of them, but the very fact that the strike there lasted for so long, was a surprise. Piast was one of the newest coal mines in the region. Opened in 1976, in 1981 it employed some 7,000 people. Most of them were young, inexperienced miners, recruited from other parts of Poland. The crew was not integrated, and the miners did not identify themselves with the mine.

== The strike ==
The protest at Piast began in the morning of December 14, 1981, 650 meters below the ground. Miners of the first shift lay down their tools, upon hearing that Eugeniusz Szelągowski, deputy of Factory Committee of Solidarity, had been arrested, together with Stanisław Dziwak of Factory Committee of Solidarity at Enterprise of Mining Works at nearby town of Mysłowice. The strike was initiated by one person, Stanisław Trybus. At the end of the first shift, when miners were waiting to get back to the surface and go home, he jumped on a bench and cried that they should do something about the arrests of their fellow union activists. After years, Trybus stated that he was surprised at the reaction of other miners, as his idea was universally supported.

In the evening of that day, four members of Factory Committee of Solidarity went down the shaft - chairman Wiesław Zawadzki, also Andrzej Machalica, Andrzej Oczko, and Adam Urbańczyk, as well as a member of Solidarity’s National Coordinating Commission of Mining, Zbigniew Bogacz. All five had been asked by the manager of the mine to convince the workers to end the strike. Instead, Zawadzki and his people remained underground. Meanwhile, crews of second and third shifts joined the protest, and by December 15, some 2,000 stayed in the dark underground corridors. Their lamps had been used up, but the management did not allow to replace them, so the miners spent two weeks in darkness.

From the very beginning, the action was voluntary, and its organizers made it clear that those who did not wish to protest, were free to leave the mine. The protest was supported by families of miners, as well as inhabitants of the town. Also, those miners who remained on the surface, collected money for their colleagues. On December 15, a pay day, some 1,5 million zlotys was collected for them.

=== Government response ===
Local authorities, who wanted the strike to end as quickly as possible, would use different methods, such as threatening the miners, as well as their families. Among others, they tried to persuade wives of protesting workers to call their husbands and convince them to return home. Threats of flooding underground corridors were spread, also rumors circulated that the authorities would gas the miners. Furthermore, supplies of food sent down to the miners were gradually reduced. Use of force was contemplated for a while, but since the protest took place underground, that idea was abandoned. The authorities contacted Roman Catholic clergy, informing them that the strike lingered on only because a “group of Solidarity extremists terrorized other miners, forcing them to remain underground”. According to the documents, which were released after the collapse of the Communist system, the authorities made a detailed plan of use of the military units, together with armored carriers, tanks and weapons, but the intervention did not take place due to the fact that the miners stayed underground.

On Christmas Eve 1981, upon request of the government, Janusz Zimniak, auxiliary bishop of Katowice, went down to meet the workers. After talking with them, Zimniak saw that official information about the protest was nothing but propaganda lies, so he did not urge the miners to return to the surface, telling them instead that the decision was “up to their conscience”.

== The end ==
Miners spent Christmas underground, away from their families, already knowing that they were the last striking enterprise in Poland. Since staying underground for such a long time was bad for their health, on December 28 the strike ended, with some 1,000 returning home in the evening. While going up in the elevators, the miners sang the Polish anthem, and after emerging on the ground, they prayed in front of a painting of Saint Barbara.

On the same day, arrests of leaders of the protest took place. Many workers were dismissed, and seven were brought to court: Zbigniew Bogacz, Wiesław Dudziński, Andrzej Machalica, Andrzej Oczko, Stanisław Paluch, Adam Urbańczyk and Wiesław Zawadzki. Military prosecutor accused them of organizing and leading the protest, demanding from 10 to 15 years for each person. During the trial, an unusual situation took place, as all prosecutor’s witnesses withdrew their testimonies, stating that they had either been fabricated or extorted. Finally, on May 12, 1982, all cases were dismissed, due to lack of evidence. All seven miners were released, and rearrested on the same day, a few hours later. Zbigniew Bogacz remained in prison until December 12, 1982.

== See also ==
- Poznań 1956 protests
- 1970 Polish protests
- Jastrzębie-Zdrój 1980 strikes
- Lublin 1980 strikes
- 1981 general strike in Bielsko-Biała
- Pacification of Wujek
