= 1988 Polish strikes =

Wave of workers' strikes in the Polish People's Republic

- Part of the Cold War and the anti-communist resistance in Poland (1944–1989)
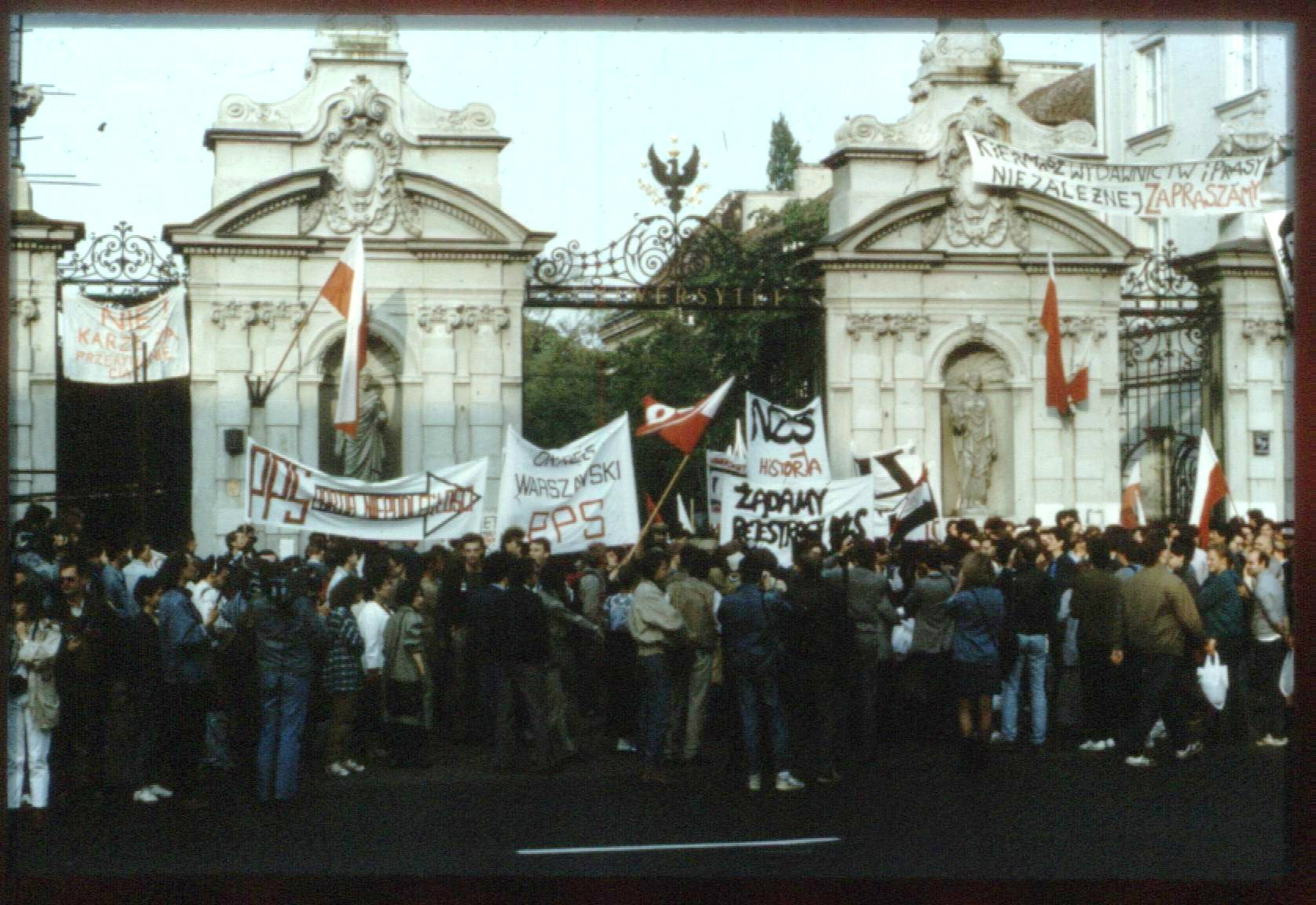
- Demonstration in front of the main gate of Warsaw University, May 1988
- Date: 21 April - 1 September 1988 (4 months, 1 week and 4 days)
- Location: Gdańsk; especially the shipyard, Upper Silesia, Stalowa Wola, as well as Szczecin
- Methods: Protesting, riots, demonstrations
- Result: The government negotiates with Solidarity: Polish Round Table Agreement starts; Parliamentary elections start on 4 June 1989

Parties
Government of Polish People's Republic: Polish United Workers' Party; Ministry of National Defence; Polish People's Army; Polish Land Forces; Security Service; Citizens' Militia; Motorized Reserves of the Citizens' Militia; Volunteer Reserves of the Citizens' Militia	Polish opposition: Solidarity-supporting protesters

Lead figures
Wojciech Jaruzelski; Zbigniew Messner	Lech Wałęsa

The 1988 Polish strikes were a massive wave of workers' strikes which broke out from 21 April 1988 in the Polish People's Republic.

The strikes, as well as street demonstrations, continued throughout spring and summer, ending in early September 1988. These actions shook the Communist regime of the country to such an extent that it was forced to begin talking about recognising Solidarity. As a result, later that year, the regime decided to negotiate with the opposition, which opened way for the 1989 Round Table Agreement. The second, much bigger wave of strikes (August 1988) surprised both the government, and top leaders of Solidarity, who were not expecting actions of such intensity. These strikes were mostly organized by local activists, who had no idea that their leaders from Warsaw had already started secret negotiations with the Communists.

== Background ==
The late 1980s was a time of deep economic crisis for Poland. The military regime of General Wojciech Jaruzelski did not carry out any radical reform of the economy in 1982-1983 following their imposition of Martial Law in Poland. Industrial production remained below the 1979 level. Average inflation rate climbed to 60% by 1988, and Poland’s hard-currency debt to the Western countries grew from $25 billion in 1981 to $43 billion in 1989. Furthermore, the military rule was a failure, even though Solidarity had been outlawed in 1982, which in turn forced its members to go underground. In those circumstances, anger and frustration of the nation grew, deepened by economic malaise, and constantly declining living standards. More than 60% of population lived in poverty, and inflation, measured by black-market rate of the U.S. dollar, was 1,500% in the period 1982 - 1987.

On 29 November 1987 the Communists decided to seek popular support for a 110% price increase, calling the Referendum on political and economic reforms (see Referendums in Poland) supported by the old slogan of "democratization" as the only concession. The government of Zbigniew Messner lost the referendum - according to independent sources, with a turnout of around 30%, - but officially, it was announced that 63.8% voters participated in it, and so, deputy prime minister Zdzisław Sadowski decided to go on with the price increase. The policy was introduced on 1 February 1988. It was the biggest hike since 1982. The operation was a failure, as the massive price increases were followed by 40% increase in wages, meant to offset the price increases. As a result, inflation rose at alarming speed, and by late 1989, near hyperinflation was reached.

== Repressions against the Solidarity movement ==
In late 1987, Communist authorities initiated a wave of repressions of activists of underground Solidarity trade union and other oppositional organizations. On 9 November Kornel Morawiecki, leader of Fighting Solidarity, was arrested. In the same year, Lech Wałęsa resumed his post as leader of Solidarity, where he remained until 1990. Meanwhile, local branches of the movement tried to legalize themselves in courts across Poland, but all these attempts were refused. On 31 August 1987, the 7th anniversary of the Gdańsk Agreement, street demonstrations and clashes with police took place in Warsaw, Wrocław, Lublin, and Bydgoszcz. On 8 March 1988, on the 20th anniversary of the 1968 Polish political crisis, activists of the Independent Students Union organized demonstrations in Warsaw, Kraków and Lublin. Most active demonstrators were immediately repressed by the government.

== Spring 1988 strikes ==
On 21 April 1988, 5000 workers of Stalowa Wola Steelworks organized a meeting, during which they demanded end of repressions of Solidarity activists, and 20,000 złoty salary increase. The first strikes broke out four days later, on 25 April 1988, in mass transportation centers in northern cities of Bydgoszcz and Inowrocław. On the next day, one of the biggest companies of the country, Vladimir Lenin Steelworks in Kraków, joined the strike. The workers demanded salary increase, re-employment of Solidarity activists, who had been fired during the martial law, as well as legalization of Solidarity. Meanwhile, a strike broke out in Stalowa Wola Steelworks. Both these actions were suppressed by the Communist security forces (ZOMO), supported by anti-terrorist units. In Stalowa Wola, a demonstration of force, together with threats of use of regular army troops, was sufficient, and the strikers gave up on 30 April. In Kraków, however, the workers continued their action, therefore the government decided to use power. In the night of 4–5 May the steelworks were brutally pacified by the ZOMO and anti-terrorist units. In reaction to the attack, workers of several factories across the country organized protests and meetings.

On 1 May 1988, opposition activists organized peaceful demonstrations in several Polish cities, such as Bielsko-Biała, Dąbrowa Górnicza, Gdańsk, Kraków, Łódź, Płock, Poznań, Warsaw, and Wrocław. They were attended by thousands of people, and in some places, street fights erupted. On the next day, a strike broke out in Lenin Gdańsk Shipyard, where workers demanded re-legalization of Solidarity. Soon, Tadeusz Mazowiecki and Andrzej Wielowieyski showed up in Gdańsk, ready to talk to the management of the plant. However, the talks were fruitless, and on 10 May, after threats of use of force, the strike ended in the atmosphere of failure. The last strike of the spring took place in Szczecin, involving workers of city’s mass transit system.

== Summer 1988 strikes ==
During late spring and early summer of 1988, the situation in Poland did not improve. In several cities, local Solidarity branches unsuccessfully tried to legalize the union. On 19 June local elections took place, and Solidarity urged voters to boycott them. On 26 July government spokesman Jerzy Urban said that Solidarity permanently belonged to the past, and two days later, Polish sociologists announced that only 28% of Poles believed that government’s reforms would succeed. Most people thought that the reforms would end up with even deeper crisis. The first strike of summer 1988 took place in the Upper Silesian city of Jastrzębie-Zdrój, and it began on 15 August.

=== Upper Silesia ===
On 15 August a strike broke out at the July Manifesto coal mine in Jastrzębie-Zdrój; the mine had been a center of strikes eight years earlier (see Jastrzębie-Zdrój 1980 strikes). Importantly, miners from July Manifesto tried to start a strike on 15 May 1988, but the main activists of Solidarity had been arrested by the Służba Bezpieczeństwa, whose special agents got word of the plans. In the second half of August, further mines, most from southern Upper Silesia joined the strikers, and the Interfactory Strike Committee under Krzysztof Zakrzewski was founded in Jastrzębie-Zdrój. Miners from Jastrzębie-Zdrój were supported by a local priest, reverend Bernard Czernecki.

Among the striking coalmines were:

- Borynia from Jastrzębie-Zdrój,
- Jastrzębie from Jastrzębie-Zdrój,
- Moszczenica from Jastrzębie-Zdrój,
- ZMP from Żory,
- Krupiński from Żory,
- XXX-lecia PRL from Pniówek,
- 1 Maja from Wodzisław Śląski,
- Marcel from Wodzisław Śląski,
- Morcinek from Kaczyce,
- Andaluzja from Piekary Śląskie,
- Lenin from Mysłowice.

Communist secret services, as well as conformist Solidarity leaders, were completely surprised by the strikes in Upper Silesia. In a report dated 14 August 1988, special agents of Służba Bezpieczeństwa wrote: “According to our sources, opposition leaders are not planning anything”. Later, some of the strikes were broken by the Milicja Obywatelska special, antiriot detachments - at Morcinek coalmine in Kaczyce (24 August), Lenin in Myslowice, and Andaluzja in Piekary. Almost all strikes took place in mines, whose employees were people transferred from other areas of Poland in the 1970s. Mines in “traditional” parts of Upper Silesia did not join the protestors, except for Andaluzja from Piekary Slaskie, and Lenin from Myslowice.

On 2 September Lech Wałęsa appeared in the July Manifesto coalmine, the last place that continued the strike. After his appeal, and a long argument, the miners decided to give up. The strike at July Manifesto was the longest one of Communist Poland.

=== Szczecin ===
On 17 August the Port of Szczecin began to strike. In the following days, other companies from Szczecin stopped working, and the Interfactory Strike Committee was founded. It issued a statement, which consisted of four points, one of which was the demand of legalization of Solidarity. On 28 August the Committee announced that Wałęsa was its sole representative. In response, Wałęsa sent to Szczecin a statement about his meeting with Czesław Kiszczak, during which the future Round Table talks had been discussed. Nevertheless, the strikes in Szczecin did not end until 3 September. Wałęsa had informed the public about talks with the regime during the 21 August demonstration in Gdańsk.

=== Stalowa Wola ===
By far the biggest strike of summer 1988 took place in Stalowa Wola Steelworks, in which around 10,000 workers participated, and the plant was surrounded by militarized police units. The Stalowa Wola strike was so significant, that it was dubbed “the fourth nail in the coffin of Communism”.

Since the Steelworks was an arms manufacturer, the factory, which in the 1980s employed around 21,000 people, was under a watchful eye of the security services, and its employees were strictly prohibited from undertaking any kind of oppositional activities. Nevertheless, across the 1980s, it was one of main centers of protests and demonstrations, and in spring of 1988, Stalowa Wola workers started the first strike of that year, which ended after a few days, and which was a prelude of the summer events. On the morning of 22 August, workers at the plant decided to organize a sit-in, with only one demand - legalization of Solidarity. This decision was crucial for further events in Poland, as strikes in Upper Silesia were slowly coming to an end. Led by Wieslaw Wojtas, the strike lasted 11 days. Workers were supported by local priests, and activists of the so-called Supporting Office, who delivered food, medicine, blankets, helped those beaten by government security forces, but also informed Western Europe about situation in Stalowa Wola. Every day, citizens of the town gathered by the Gate 3 to the steelworks, where local parish priest, reverend Edmund Frankowski, celebrated two masses (26 and 31 August), which were attended by up to 10,000 people. Frankowski actively supported the strikers, in the sermons, he urged the faithful to help the workers.

The Stalowa Wola strike ended on 1 September, after the personal request of Lech Wałęsa, who called Wiesław Wojtas, telling him: “You are great, but please, end the strike, I am asking you in the name of Solidarity”. Following Wałęsa's request, 4,000 workers left the factory on 1 September at 7 p.m. Together with around 15,000 inhabitants of the city, they marched to the Church of Mary, Queen of Poland, where they were greeted by reverend Frankowski, who said: “Illegal priest is welcoming participants of the illegal strike”.

=== Gdańsk ===
On 19 August a group of young activists began circulating leaflets, urging workers of the Gdańsk Lenin Shipyard to join striking miners from Jastrzębie-Zdrój. According to Alojzy Szablewski, who was leader of plant’s Solidarity, Lech Wałęsa was called, and during a meeting it was decided the strike would begin on Monday 22 August. On that day, at 7 a.m., some 3000 workers put away their tools. Their only demand was short - legalization of Solidarity.

Soon afterwards, other main factories of Gdańsk joined the shipyard - Port Polnocny, Stocznia Polnocna, Stocznia Remontowa. Interfactory Strike Committee was founded, led by Jacek Merkel, and workers were supported by a number of personalities, such as Jacek Kuroń, Adam Michnik, Lech Kaczyński, and his twin brother Jarosław Kaczyński. Unlike in August 1980, the 1988 strike was different, as the government lacked power to force the strikers to give up. Furthermore, Gdańsk Lenin Shipyard was visited by a number of guests from abroad, including Boston Mayor Ray Flynn, in whose presence the use of force was not likely. The events in Gdańsk were described by Padraic Kenney as truly Orange Alternative strike. Workers of the Gdańsk Repair Shipyard mocked secret service and police agents, by making a styrofoam tank with the slogan: Leave your arms at the gate, we want dialogue.

The strikes in Gdańsk ended on 1 September, and on 3 September both sides signed an agreement, according to which the communists promised not to persecute the strikers. The promise was broken, and hundreds of people were fired in the fall of 1988.

== Outcome ==
At first, the government tried to threaten the protestors; on 20 August, the Committee of National Defence announced preparations for introduction of national state of emergency. However, the determination of the workers made the Communists realize that talks with the officially non-existent trade union were inevitable. On 31 August General Czesław Kiszczak met with Lech Wałęsa. During the conversation, which was witnessed by Archbishop Bronisław Wacław Dąbrowski, Kiszczak appealed for putting an end to strikes, he also promised to take care of legalisation of Solidarity.

Even though Solidarity activists in several centers opposed Wałęsa's appeal to end strikes, soon afterwards laborers returned to work. The last strikes, in the Port of Szczecin and the July Manifesto coal mine, lasted until 3 September. On 18 December Wałęsa established the Solidarity Citizens' Committee, which opened way for the Polish Round Table Agreement.

In 1988, director Andrzej Piekutowski made a documentary film Coal Miners’88, which presents strike in July Manifesto coal mine. Also, Pawel Smolenski and Wojciech Gielzynski wrote a book Workers’88.

== See also ==
- History of Solidarity
- Lublin 1980 strikes
- Polish 1970 protests
- Poznań 1956 protests
- 1981 warning strike in Poland
