= National Coordinating Commission =

National Coordinating Commission (Polish: Krajowa Komisja Porozumiewawcza, KKP), later called the National Commission (Komisja Krajowa, KK) was the executive branch of the Solidarity trade union. It was created on September 17, 1980, in Gdańsk, as a national body which coordinated activities of regional and factory structures of Solidarity, and it included members of the Interfactory Founding Committees (Międzyzakładowy Komitet Założycielski – MKZ) in Polish cities.

Lech Wałęsa was the head of the KKP, and the deputies were Andrzej Gwiazda and Ryszard Kalinowski. There were around 30 founding members of the KKP, in the course of the time, this number grew significantly, and at the beginning of 1981 it was announced that each Voivodeship was assigned only one member to the KKP.

Within the Commission, a special body, called Eleven (Jedenastka) was created on November 19, 1980. It included representatives of 11 biggest centers of the growing movement: Bydgoszcz, Gdańsk, Jastrzębie-Zdrój, Kraków, Lublin, Łódź, Poznań, Rzeszów, Szczecin, Warsaw, Wrocław. Statutes of Solidarity, accepted on September 20, 1980, defined competences of the KKP. These were:

- representing the union to the government of Poland,
- coordination of activities of the regional branches of Solidarity,
- control of budget of the union,
- signing collective work agreements,
- election of the head of the KKP and members of its Presidium.

In 1980–1981, the Presidium consisted of Lech Wałęsa, Andrzej Gwiazda, Ryszard Kalinowski, and members: Zbigniew Bujak from Warsaw, Tadeusz Jedynak from Jastrzebie, Jan Rulewski from Bydgoszcz, Andrzej Slowik from Łódź, Stanisław Wądołowski from Szczecin, and secretary of KKP, Andrzej Celiński, as well as a spokesperson, Karol Modzelewski (replaced by Janusz Onyszkiewicz).
