= Łódź rebellion =

The Łódź Rebellion was a general strike and mass demonstrations that took place in Łódź on May 2–8, 1892.

In the lead-up to the rebellion, socialists from Łódź had published a proclamation in which they demanded an eight-hour working day, an increase in wages and political freedoms. The strikes began on May 2 (May 1 was a Sunday) which affected the largest factories in Łódź. Violence erupted quickly as the police beat the strikers and the workers attacked the factory owners, including among others Ignacy Poznański, the son of Izrael Poznański. Some industrialists responded by making concessions. Scheibler's factory proposed an 8% increase of pay and a reduction of working time by an hour, while others, such as Izrael Poznański and Julius Kunitzer refused to make any concessions.

During the rally in what is now Wolności Square, the tailor Kazimierz Wachowicz was chosen as leader and hailed as “the king of Poland,” but he was arrested by the Cossacks and did not lead the strike.

On May 5, there was a pogrom of Jews in Bałuty. Jewish residents in Łódź tried to defend themselves and their property, and some were killed.

The riots were ended by a bloody intervention by the tsarist army and the police, during which about 100 people were killed and 300 were injured. Hundreds of people were also arrested and transported to Warsaw under military escort. Initial reports from Łódź suggested that 30,000 people had participated in the strike activities.

== In culture ==
The Łódź rebellion is described in Israel Joshua Singer's novel, The Brothers Ashkenazi.
