= Staszic Coal Mine =

Coal mine in Poland

Coordinates: 50.2248°N 19.0442°E

Staszic coal mine
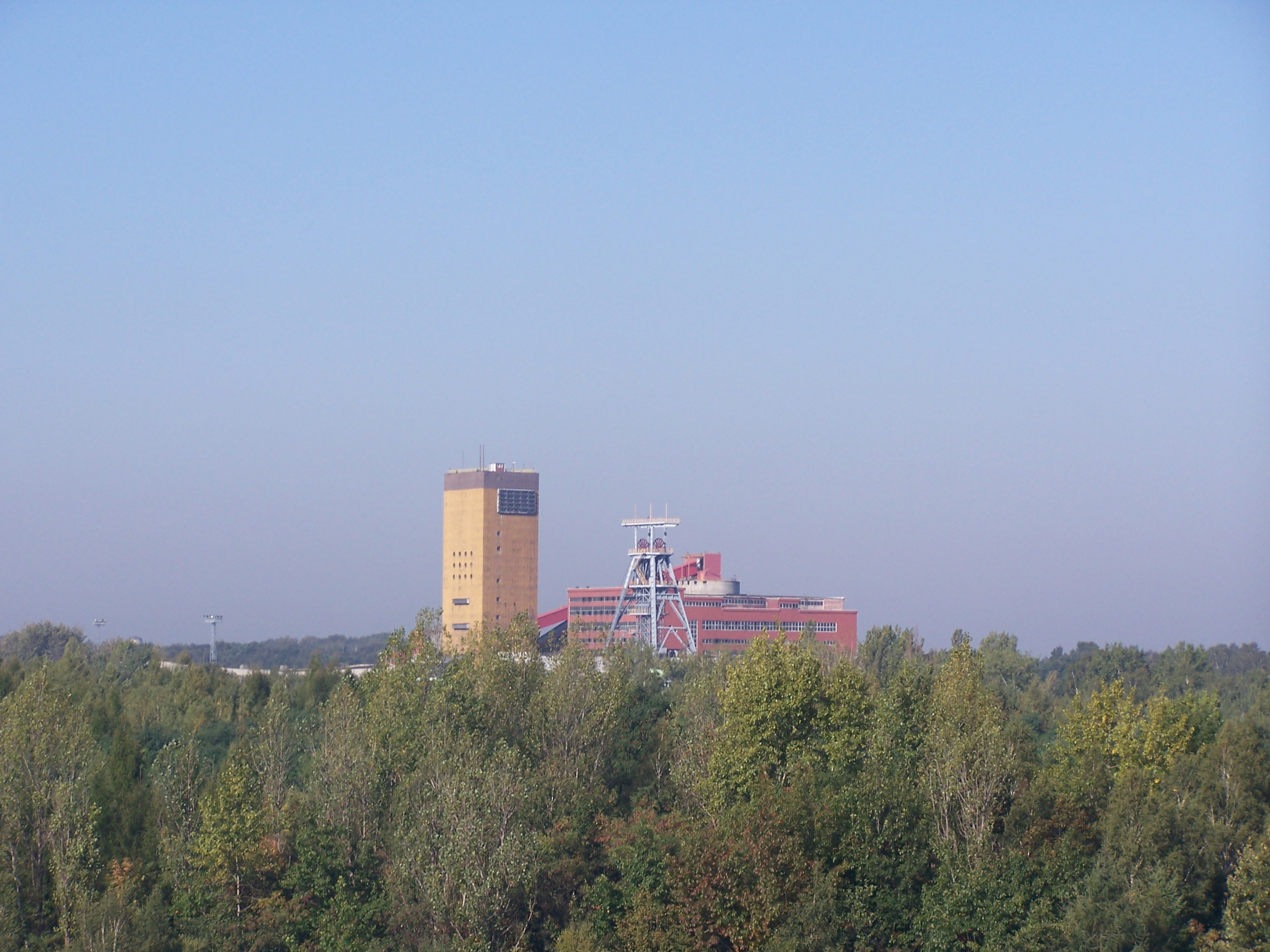
- Staszic Coal Mine - Giszowiec
- Interactive map of Staszic coal mine
- Location: Katowice, Silesian Voivodeship, Poland
- Products: Coal
- Production: 5,700,000
- Opened: 1955
- Company: Katowicki Holding Węglowy

The Staszic coal mine is a large mine in the south of Poland in Katowice, Silesian Voivodeship, 260 km south-west of the capital, Warsaw. Staszic represents one of the largest coal reserve in Poland having estimated reserves of 343.8 million tonnes of coal. The annual coal production is around 5.7 million tonnes.
