= Jedynak (surname) =

Jedynak is a Polish-language surname. Notable people with the surname include:

- Małgorzata Jarosińska-Jedynak (born 1979), Polish statesperson and engineer
- Radosław Jedynak (born 1982), Polish chess Grandmaster
- Tadeusz Janusz Jedynak (1949–2017), Polish politician in Silesia, high-ranking member of Solidarity
- Tadeusz Jedynak (general) (1919–1987), Polish general
