= 1981 warning strike in Poland =

Nationwide protest of the Bydgoszcz events

- Date: 27 March 1981
- Location: Poland
- Caused by: Bydgoszcz events; Authoritarianism
- Methods: Civil disobedience; Strike action; Picketing; Mass protest; Warning strike
- Result: Status quo ante: 12–14 million people participate in the strikes; Strikes end after four hours

Parties
Polish People's Republic; Polish United Workers' Party; Citizens' Militia; Motorized Reserves of the Citizens' Militia	(Polish People's Republic) Polish opposition: Solidarity; National Coordinating Commission; National Strike Committee; Warsaw Committee; Wrocław Committee; Kraków Committee; Lublin Committee; Łódź Committee; Katowice Committee; Poznań Committee; Opole Committee; Szczecin Committee; Sandomierz Committee; Białystok Committee; Rzeszów Committee; Przemyśl Committee; (Polish People's Republic) Government defectors

Lead figures
Stanisław Kania; Wojciech Jaruzelski; Mieczysław Rakowski	Lech Wałęsa

Number
Unknown	12,000,000–14,000,000 participants

The 1981 warning strike in Poland was a four-hour national warning strike that took place during and in response to the Bydgoszcz events. There, in the early spring of 1981 in the Polish People's Republic, several members of the Solidarity movement, including Jan Rulewski, Mariusz Łabentowicz, and Roman Bartoszcze, were beaten by the security forces, including Milicja Obywatelska and ZOMO. The Bydgoszcz events soon became widely known across Poland, and on 24 March 1981, Solidarity called for a nationwide strike in protest against the violence.

The strike was planned for Tuesday 31 March 1981. On 25 March, Lech Wałęsa met Deputy Prime Minister Mieczysław Rakowski of the Polish United Workers' Party, but they were unable to come to an agreement. Two days later, on 27 March, the warning strike took place. It was the most highly participated strike in the history of both Poland and the Warsaw Pact. According to several sources, between 12 and 14 million Poles took part, roughly 85-90% of Poland's working-age population at the time.

== Background ==
After the Bydgoszcz events, millions of Poles reacted angrily to the beatings of the members of Solidarity. The atmosphere in the country grew even more tense when the government of the Polish People's Republic denied any wrongdoing, stating that the security services were simply doing their duty to restore order. Anger was increased by the state's description of the particulars of the beatings as "claims by Solidarity sources".

The mass media alleged that Jan Rulewski, one of the beaten activists, had been hurt in a car accident, not as a result of the intervention of the police. Furthermore, in the early spring of 1981, the Soviet Army carried out huge military exercises named Soyuz 81 on Polish soil.

The maneuvers were regarded by many Poles as the preparation of a Soviet invasion of Poland. Marshal Viktor Kulikov, Commander-in-Chief of the Warsaw Pact, told the Polish general staff that despite the political situation, the exercises would continue indefinitely. In Washington, the situation in Poland was described as being marked by "political tension at its highest level since last November". Soviet military exercises continued until 7 April.

Meanwhile, leaders of the Solidarity gathered at the meeting of the National Coordinating Commission (Krajowa Komisja Porozumiewawcza); they ordered all regional offices of the organisation to stay alert and be prepared for a national strike. On 21 March in Bydgoszcz, a two-hour warning strike took place; in a special press release, Solidarity announced that the Bydgoszcz events were a provocation, directed toward the government of Prime Minister Wojciech Jaruzelski.

The government responded by sending a special commission to Bydgoszcz, headed by General Jozef Zyto, Deputy Prosecutor-General, whose task was to clear up the situation and determine who was guilty of the beatings of the Solidarity activists. However, its members were not interested in fulfilling their mission, and their inactivity was criticized by Solidarity. Opposition activists were personally insulted by the Bydgoszcz events, believing that if the beatings could happen to Jan Rulewski, they could happen to any of them. A statement of the Polish United Workers' Party did not improve the situation, as it characterised the Bydgoszcz events as a "flagrant violation of law, which created new tensions".

Most members of Solidarity's National Coordinating Commission (NCC) were in favor of a nationwide, general strike, which would completely paralyze the country until all details of the Bydgoszcz events had been clarified and those guilty punished. A few were against such action, such as Bronisław Geremek, who said that the decision for an unlimited general strike would be a decision for a national insurrection.

During the 23 March 1981 meeting in Bydgoszcz, the majority of the members of the National Coordinating Commission voted in favour of a more moderate proposal, suggested by Lech Wałęsa. He advocated a four-hour national warning strike to be held on Friday, 27 March 1981 between 8 a.m. and 12 p.m. Wałęsa's proposal was accepted only after a heated all-night session, during which the Solidarity leader threatened to walk out.

On 22 March during the church service transmitted by Polish Radio, Bishop Stefan Wyszyński appealed both to the government and Solidarity to "work out mutual rights and duties"; he also mentioned several times the danger of a "foreign factor". On 26 March, Wyszyński personally talked with General Jaruzelski; two days later, he met with Wałęsa and other Solidarity activists.

The demands of the opposition were:

1. The immediate punishment or suspension of officials considered responsible for the Bydgoszcz incident
2. Permission for the peasants to form their own union: Rural Solidarity
3. Security for union members and activists in their activities and the unions' right of reply to any criticism of their work (this right to be exercised through the media)
4. Annulment of a government directive giving only half-pay to strikers
5. The dismissal of all pending cases against people arrested for political opposition to government policies between 1976 and 1980, "even if in the light of existing laws their activities constituted offenses."

If no agreement between the government and Solidarity had been reached, the general strike was planned for Tuesday, 31 March. Meanwhile, a meeting between representatives of the NCC, headed by Wałęsa, and members of the Council of Ministers' Committee for Trade Unions, headed by Deputy Prime Minister Mieczysław Rakowski took place in Warsaw but ended without agreement. During this meeting, a Solidarity activist from Szczecin yelled at Rakowski: "What if your wife cheats on you once, twice, three times? Will you trust her? We do not trust you any longer!".

== Strike ==
Timothy Garton Ash, who was in Poland at that time, wrote that Solidarity's mobilisation of its members was swift and effective, making it "the most impressive democratic mass mobilisation of any modern European society in peacetime, against its rulers' wishes". In his opinion, Poland looked like a country going to war, with national red and white flags everywhere, and the women making red and white armbands for men who were to guard the occupied factories.

The National Strike Committee was established in Gdańsk, in the birthplace of Solidarity – the Lenin Shipyard. Its members were Lech Wałęsa, Andrzej Gwiazda, Zbigniew Bujak, Andrzej Cierniewski, Lech Dymarski, Krzysztof Gotowski, Marian Jurczyk, Ryszard Kalinowski, Antoni Kopczewski, Bogdan Lis and Andrzej Słowik.

Later in March 1981, during preparations for the general strike, three of Solidarity's instructions to the workers were issued:

1. In case of a General Strike. It specified a countrywide occupation-strike, where worker guards would be on a 24-hour watch, forbidding possession or consumption of any alcoholic beverages;
2. In case of a State of Emergency. It specified steps to be taken in case of militarization of factories, urging the formations of shadow strike committees;
3. In case of a Foreign Intervention. It suggested possible means of passive resistance to foreign troops in case of an invasion.

Apart from the National Strike Committee, several Interfactory Founding Committees (MKZ) were created in major cities. For security reasons, these offices were moved to large factories for the time of the strike, no matter how long it was planned to be. Therefore;

- Białystok Committee was placed in the Factory of Instruments and Handles in Białystok (Polish: Fabryka Przyrządów i Uchwytów BISON-BIAL) located then in 3 Łąkowa street,
- Katowice Committee was placed in the Baildon Steelworks in Katowice,
- Kraków Committee was placed in the Vladimir Lenin Steel Works in Nowa Huta,
- Łódź Committee was placed in the Julian Marchlewski Cotton Plant in Łódź,
- Lublin Committee was placed in the Automotive Factory in Lublin,
- Opole Committee was placed in the Frotex Factory in Prudnik,
- Poznań Committee was placed in the Cegielski Factory in Poznań,
- Przemyśl Committee was placed in the Plywood Factory in Przemyśl,
- Rzeszów Committee was placed in the Communications Equipment Factory in Rzeszów,
- Sandomierz Land Committee was placed in the Steel Works in Stalowa Wola,
- Szczecin Committee was placed in the Szczecin Shipyard,
- Warsaw Committee was placed in the Ursus Factory in Warsaw,
- Wrocław Committee was placed in the joined factories of Pafawag and Dolmel in Wrocław.

The preparations of the strike reflected an unprecedented level of planning, and in effect, worker fortresses were created across Poland, patrolled by round-the-clock guards and the strike itself is regarded as the biggest organizational success of Solidarity, with virtually all working people of Poland participating in it. Historians from the Institute of National Remembrance claim that in late March 1981, Solidarity was at the "peak of its popularity."

The strike took place on Friday, 27 March 1981 "in an atmosphere of calm, order, and dignity." Many Polish workers took part in it. Basic services and crucial industrial plants, such as steelworks and armament factories, operated without breaks. Solidarity announced that these plants would go on strike as well in the event of an armed intervention.

Almost all schools, universities and colleges joined the strike, as well as public television. At the time, there were no private television stations in Poland. During the four hours of protest, Television screens in Poland showed the words "Solidarity-Strike", and the whole country was brought to a halt. Those who had to keep working, like employees of hospitals, put on white–red armbands, to express their solidarity.

== Aftermath ==
After four hours, at midday, the sirens across the country sounded and Poland went back to work. The size of the strike shocked the leadership of the Polish United Workers' Party, especially when it turned out that members of the party had widely participated. At that time, Solidarity had some 9 million members, but 12–14 million people took part in the strike.

Meanwhile, Lech Wałęsa's advisors, such as Tadeusz Mazowiecki and Bronisław Geremek, told the leader of Solidarity that the general strike, planned for 30 March, would mean civil war and the risk was too high. Diplomats from Western countries were also aware of the tense situation in Poland. Military attaches from the United Kingdom, the United States and West Germany were ordered not to leave Poland. In case of a Soviet invasion of Poland, the United States was planning a military blockade and invasion of Cuba in response.

On 30 March 1981, the government of Poland reached an agreement with the Solidarity Movement. The government of Poland conceded to demands regarding police brutality, but the agreement to legalize Rural Solidarity was postponed, as well as further steps on the issue of political prisoners. The government acknowledged its mishandling of the Bydgoszcz events, and in return, the opposition side, including Lech Wałęsa, agreed to postpone the general strike.

== See also ==
- Soviet reaction to the Polish crisis of 1980–1981
