= Lech Dymarski =

Polish poet and politician

Lech Dymarski (born 18 October 1949) is a Polish poet, opposition political activist in Communist Poland, state functionary in post-Communist Poland, member of regional legislature (Greater Poland Regional Assembly, 1998, 2002, 2006, 2010).

== Awards ==
- 1990: Order of Polonia Restituta, Knight's Cross
- 2007: Order of Polonia Restituta, Officer's Cross
- 2014: Order of Polonia Restituta
- 2015: Cross of Freedom and Solidarity
