= Tygodnik Solidarność =

Polish weekly magazine

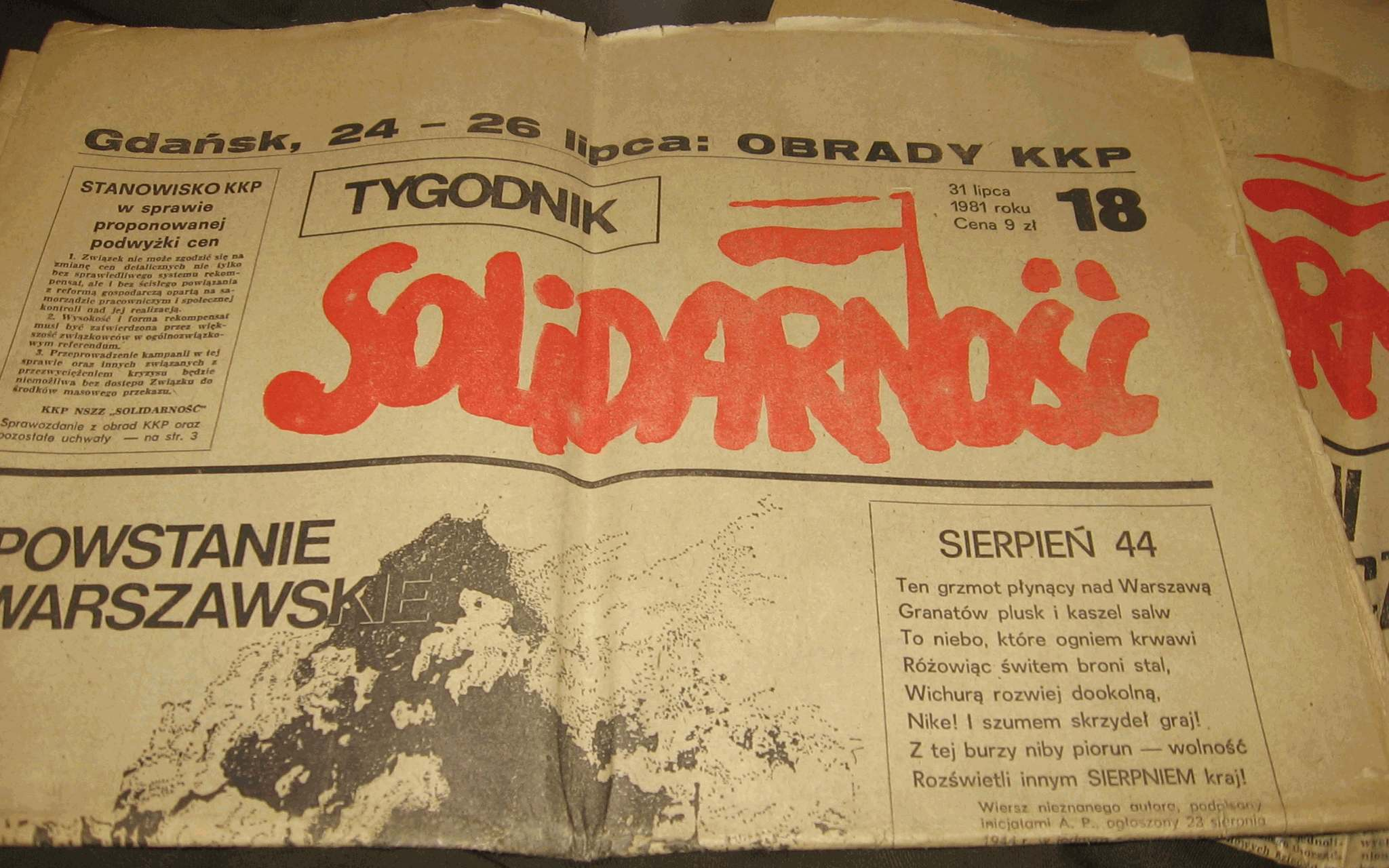
- Type: Weekly magazine
- Owner: Solidarność
- Editor: Jerzy Kłosiński
- Founded: 1981
- Political alignment: Christian democratic
- Headquarters: Warsaw
- Website: https://www.tysol.pl/

Tygodnik Solidarność ([tɨˈɡɔ.dɲik sɔ.lʲiˈdar.nɔɕt͡ɕ], "Solidarity Weekly") is the main organ of the Independent Self-Governed Trade Union "Solidarity." As an anti-Communist union paper, it is also a Polish right-wing weekly magazine. Started and published by the Solidarity movement on 3 April 1981, it was banned a year later by the People's Republic of Poland following the martial law declaration from 13 December 1981 and the thaw of 1989. It was legalized in June 1989 after the Polish legislative elections, 1989.

== Editors ==
- Tadeusz Mazowiecki
- Jarosław Kaczyński
- Andrzej Gelberg
- Jerzy Kłosiński
- Michał Ossowski
