= Upper Silesia 1980 strikes =

The Upper Silesia 1980 strikes were widespread strikes, which took place mostly in the Upper Silesian mining cities Jastrzębie-Zdrój, Wodzisław Śląski and Ruda Śląska and its surroundings, during late August and early September 1980. They forced the Government of People's Republic of Poland to sign the last of three agreements establishing the Solidarity trade union. Earlier, agreements had been signed in Gdańsk and Szczecin. The Jastrzębie Agreement, signed on September 3, 1980, ended Saturday and Sunday work for miners, a concession that Government leaders later said cut deeply into Poland's export earnings.

== Background ==
On August 14, 1980, workers of the Vladimir Lenin Shipyard in Gdańsk began a strike, demanding not only an increase in salaries, but also rehiring of Anna Walentynowicz and Lech Wałęsa, as well as the according of respect to workers' rights and other social concerns. Furthermore, they called for the legalization of independent trade unions. A Strike Committee, led by Wałęsa, was organized and the workers did not leave the shipyard, deciding to stay there for the night. Later, on the Strike Committee was turned into the City Strike Committee, also headed by Wałęsa.

In the following days, the strike spread to a growing number of factories all across the country, with numerous Inter-Enterprise Strike Committees (MKS) created in Szczecin, Wrocław, Wałbrzych, and other cities. By the end of August 1980, the protests reached Upper Silesian coal mines. The center of the protests in Upper Silesia was the Manifest Lipcowy Coal Mine in Jastrzębie-Zdrój, where the strike broke out on August 28. In August 1980, this mine employed some 10,000 people.

== The strikes in Upper Silesia ==
The strike in Jastrzębie began when 1,000 of the staff of the Manifest Lipcowy mine did not begin the night shift, spurred by the news from Gdańsk, conveyed to them by Stefan Palka, future leader of the strike. According to the witnesses, right before going under the ground, someone in the crowd yelled: "Other mines in the area are already striking, what are we waiting for?" This information was false, but the strike nevertheless began. Within the next few hours, a Strike Committee was elected, headed by Palka. It demanded talks with the director of the mine, Władysław Duda. The "arrogant" Duda agreed, but during negotiations, he started insulting the workers, which heated up the situation. Therefore, he was asked to leave and talks were terminated.

The strike in the Manifest Lipcowy mine was directly connected with catastrophic situation of the miners and poor working conditions. As the strikers recollected in 2008,(please check the year) at the beginning, few of them thought about politics. They complained about lack of gloves, work boots and basic tools. They also claim that the strike could have been broken on the second day, had it not been for their wives and children, since units of the ZOMO surrounded the mine, and did not let anybody in and out. Only children with food parcels were allowed to come close to the fence. "Their support was like a shot of adrenaline to us, we knew that we were not alone" - recollected a miner 28 years later. A few hours after the Manifest Lipcowy mine, the XXX-lecia PRL mine also began the strike.

Since all mass-media was firmly controlled by the government, the workers of the Manifest Lipcowy mine turned for help to a local Roman Catholic church. Their delegation came to the church on August 29, at 6:30 in the morning, and asked the parish priest, Rev. Bernard Czernecki, to inform the faithful about the protest. Czernecki, as well as all local priests, agreed, and during Mass, they told all worshipers about the strike, promising all the help they needed. Also, the priests handed leaders of the strike their rosaries. These can be seen in archival photos of the Jastrzębie Agreement negotiations, as workers wore them on their necks.

== Interfactory Strike Committee ==
The next morning, a mixed, government-party delegation came to the mine and tried to convince the workers that the strike was senseless. The talks were fruitless, and in the meantime, further local factories joined the protest. On August 30, the first Upper Silesian Inter-Enterprise Strike Committee was created, initially with 20 members, based in the Manifest Lipcowy mine. By September 2, the Committee gathered more than fifty striking factories, including, among others, such companies, as:

- Manifest Lipcowy coal mine in Jastrzębie,
- Borynia coal mine in Jastrzębie, Mszana, Świerklany and Pawłowice,
- Jastrzębie coal mine in Jastrzębie, Mszana,
- Moszczenica coal mine in Moszczenica, Jastrzębie-Zdrój,
- ZMP coal mine in Żory - Rój,
- Suszec coal mine in Suszec,
- XXX-lecia PRL coal mine in Pawłowice Śląskie
- Rymer coal mine in Rybnik-Niedobczyce,
- Anna coal mine in Wodzisław Śląski - Pszów,
- 1 Maja coal mine in Wodzisław Śląski - Wilchwy,
- Boleslaw Smialy coal mine in Łaziska Górne,
- Marcel coal mine in Wodzisław Śląski - Radlin,
- Wujek coal mine in Katowice - Brynów,
- Julian coal mine in Piekary Śląskie,
- Rydultowy coal mine in Wodzisław Śląski - Rydułtowy,
- Piast coal mine in Bieruń,
- Kaczyce coal mine in Kaczyce,
- Slask coal mine in Ruda Śląska - Kochłowice,
- Janina coal mine in Libiąż,
- Staszic coal mine in Katowice - Giszowiec,
- Polska coal mine in Świętochłowice - Zgoda,
- Wieczorek coal mine in Katowice - Janów,
- Halemba coal mine in Ruda Śląska - Halemba,
- Zabrze coal mine in Zabrze - Bielszowice,
- Katowice coal mine in Katowice - Bogucice,
- Brzeszcze coal mine in Brzeszcze and Czechowice-Dziedzice,
- Pokoj coal mine in Ruda Śląska - Nowy Bytom,
- Nowy Wirek coal mine in Ruda Śląska - Kochłowice.

Their demands included abolition of the four-shift work system in the mining industry as "detrimental to the family" and the introduction of Saturdays and Sundays off. The demand to establish free trade unions, based on the 21 demands of MKS, was also added and Stefan Palka became the leader of the protest. However, Jastrzębie's workers added to the Gdańsk demands several specific issues associated with the situation in the mining industry.

Apart from the mines mentioned above, several other companies joined the strike - The Enterprise of Mining Works, Voivodeship's Communications Authority, Communal Services, local mail offices, as well as teachers from city's schools. According to Jarosław Neja, a historian from the Institute of National Remembrance, in late August and early September 1980, 272 Upper Silesian factories went on strike, with around 900 000 employees. First strike in that area took place in the FAZOS company in Tarnowskie Góry on August 21, 1980 and lasted for three days.

== Negotiations and agreement ==
The negotiations started on September 2, 1980. Delegation of the government was headed by Deputy Prime Minister Aleksander Kopec (who later signed the agreement), the strikers were headed by Jarosław Sienkiewicz, chairman of the Inter-Enterprise Strike Committee. Workers of the Manifest Lipcowy mine recollect that in early days of September they doubted achieving a success, as a few days earlier, strikers in Gdańsk and Szczecin had signed their agreements and the miners were left alone. "We wanted our protest to be highlighted in the mass-media, especially TV, but we were ignored" - said Leopold Sobczyński of the Manifest Lipcowy mine.

Talks with the government were very heated and lasted fifteen hours. Finally, the Jastrzębie Agreement, the third of the 1980 agreements between Polish workers and the government, was signed on September 3, at 5:40 am. Furthermore, agreements were signed in other striking centers of Upper Silesia and Zagłębie - Fabryka Samochodów Małolitrażowych in Tychy, Katowice Steel Mill in Dąbrowa Górnicza, in Bytom, Siemianowice Śląskie, and Tarnowskie Góry. Therefore, six independent Inter-Enterprise Founding Committees were created in the Upper Silesia-Zagłębie region, they were united in July 1981.

The Jastrzębie Agreement was the last of three agreements establishing the independent Solidarity trade union, with earlier ones having been signed in Gdańsk and Szczecin. Apart from creation of Solidarity, it ended all Saturday and Sunday work for miners. The three agreements collectively were called the "new social contract". Known collectively as the Gdańsk Accords, they contained a number of state concessions, including the formation of independent trade unions, wage increases, an increase in the meat supply, and increased access to the mass media by both Solidarity and the Catholic Church.

== See also ==
- Lublin 1980 strikes
- Summer 1981 hunger demonstrations in Poland
- 1981 warning strike in Poland
- 1981 strike at Piast Coal Mine in Bieruń
- 1988 Polish strikes
