= Bydgoszcz events =

1981 government crackdown on a strike in Bydgoszcz, Poland

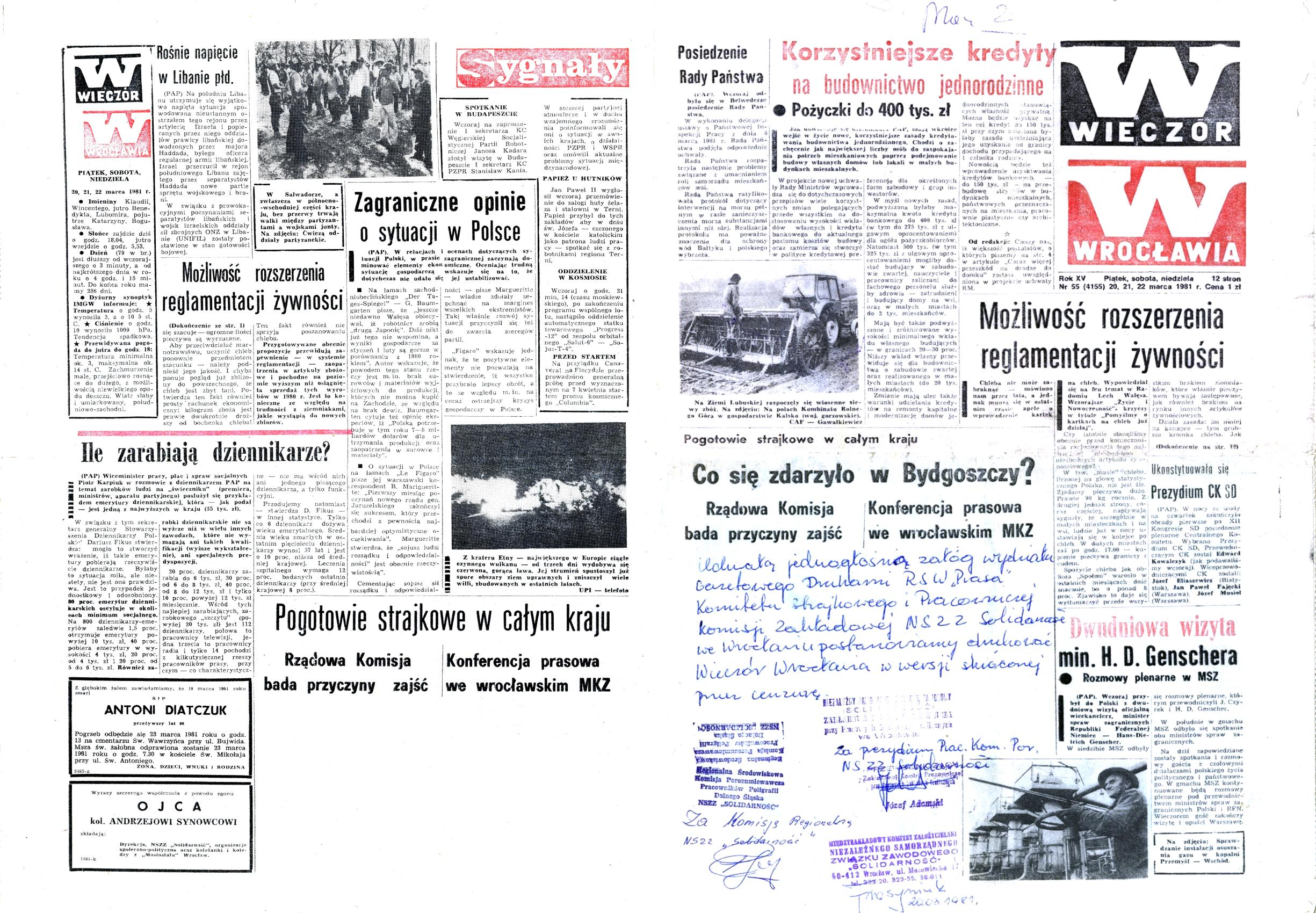
March 20–21, 1981, issue of Wieczór Wrocławia (The Wrocław Evening). Blank spaces remain after the government censor has pulled articles from page 1 (right, "What happened at Bydgoszcz?") and from the last page (left, "Country-wide strike alert"), leaving only their headlines. The printers—Solidarity-trade-union members—decided to run the newspaper as it was, with blank spaces intact to avoid concealing the censorship. The bottom of page 1 of this master copy bears the hand-written Solidarity confirmation of that decision.

The Bydgoszcz events (Polish: wypadki bydgoskie) – also referred to as the Bydgoszcz crisis (kryzys bydgoski), or the Bydgoszcz provocation (prowokacja bydgoska) – were a series of events in Poland culminating in the beatings of delegates of the Solidarity movement by the forces called upon by the authorities during the session of the voivodship National Council on 19 March 1981, which was to discuss the running strike in Bydgoszcz.

It was a turning point in the early history of Solidarity. Following the registration of Solidarity by the authorities of Poland in 1980, the farmers were also pushing for creation of a separate trade union, independent from the official system of power. The NSZZ RI Solidarność (Independent Self-Governing Trade Union of Individual Farmers Solidarity, also called Rural Solidarity) was created, but not legalized by the authorities. Because of that, on 16 March 1981 in Bydgoszcz a strike was proclaimed.

This forced the authorities to finally hold the meeting of the Voivodeship National Council, a governing body of the Bydgoszcz Voivodeship. The meeting was attended by several members of Solidarity, among them Jan Rulewski, Mariusz Łabentowicz and Roman Bartoszcze, who were to explain the reasons for the strike. However, the Council decided not to discuss the issue of Rural Solidarity, which made the members of Solidarity protest and they refused to leave the session. The authorities responded by calling in the Citizen's Militia and the ZOMO, who entered the seat of the Council and forcibly removed the delegates of Solidarity.

Even though the authorities had a monopoly on media, the underground press reported the Bydgoszcz events, and the matter became widely publicised in a matter of days. On 24 March, Solidarity decided to go on a nationwide strike to protest the violence against the delegates. The authorities conceded and on 25 March the deputy prime minister Mieczysław F. Rakowski started a conference with the leaders of the Solidarity. This led to the signing of the so-called "Warsaw accord" (porozumienie warszawskie) on 30 March 1981. According to the agreement, Solidarity was allowed to report the Bydgoszcz events on public television (the first such independent news behind the Iron Curtain since the 1940s) and the government pledged to continue the talks on registration of a trade union of farmers.

The events were extensively covered by the publication project "Kryzys Bydgoski 1981", a three-volume edition: a monograph with a DVD with film "14 dni. Prowokacja bydgoska", a collection of documents, and a collection of witness testimonies.

== See also ==
- 1981 warning strike in Poland
