= Jan Rulewski =

Polish politician

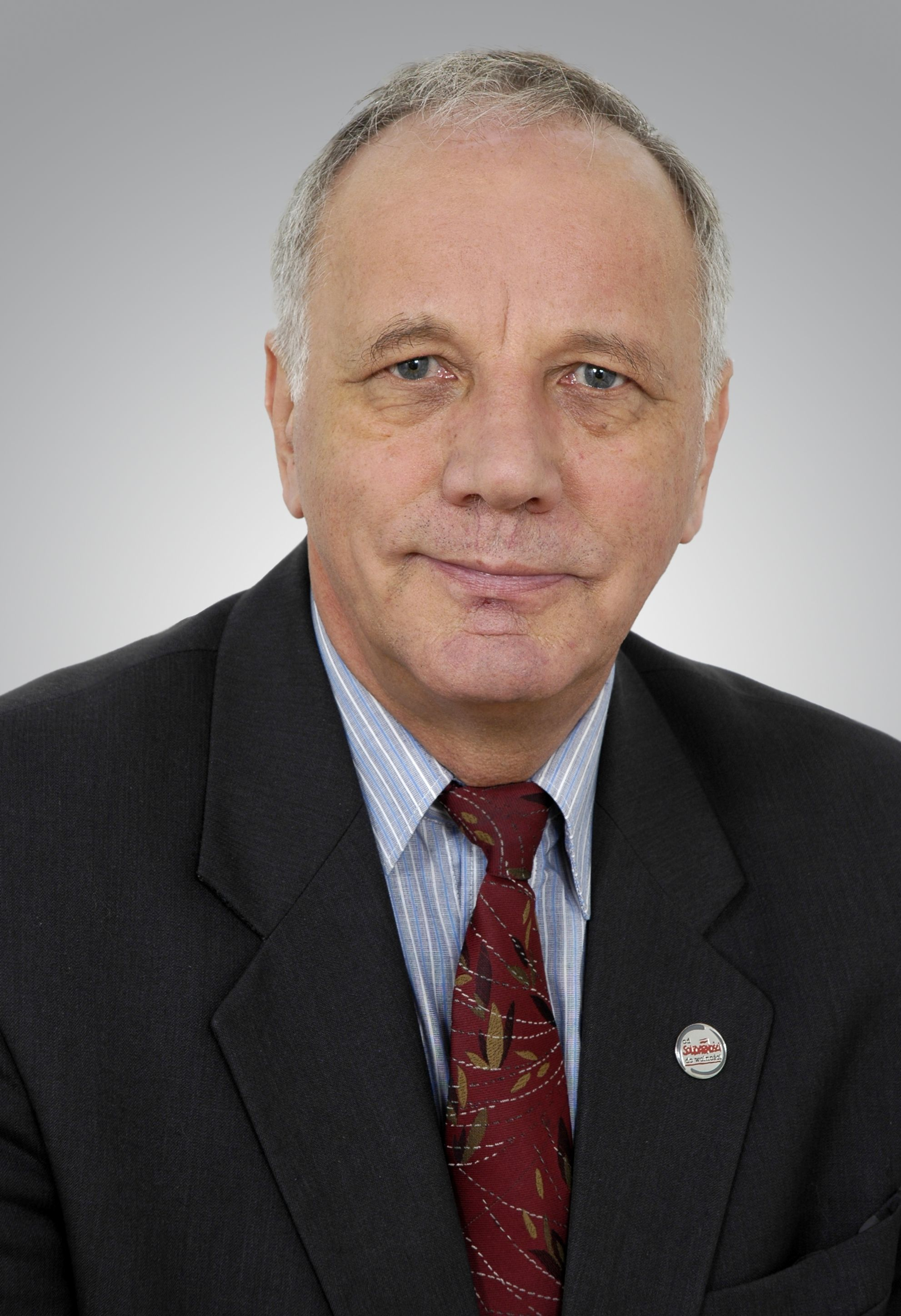
Jan Rulewski in 2010

Jan Rulewski (born April 18, 1944 in Bydgoszcz, Poland) is a Polish politician, activist of Solidarity; a Member of the Polish Sejm (1991-2001) and a Senator (from 2007 to 2019).

He was in charge of the Bydgoszcz region of Solidarity (1980-1981 and from 1989). He was assaulted by police during the Bydgoszcz events in 1981 and interned during the martial law in Poland.

He was a Member of the Sejm of the Republic of Poland from 1991 to 2001.

On October 21, 2007, Jan Rulewski (Civic Platform - PO) won in the Polish Senate election in Bydgoszcz district with 142,054 votes (33.71%). With Zbigniew Pawłowicz (PO also) was elected to the Senate of the Republic of Poland from Bydgoszcz district. He took office on November 6. He served as senator until 2019. In April 2019, he resigned from membership in the Civic Platform and from further political activity, which was motivated by PO's alliance with former members of the Polish United Worker's Party.

On August 28, 2006, Rulewski was awarded the Commander's Cross of the Order of Polonia Restituta by President Lech Kaczynski, and the Grand Cross of the Order of Polonia Restituta in 2021 by President Andrzej Duda.
