= Piast Coal Mine =

Coal mine in Bieruń, Poland

Coordinates: 50.0838°N 19.1642°E

Piast coal mine
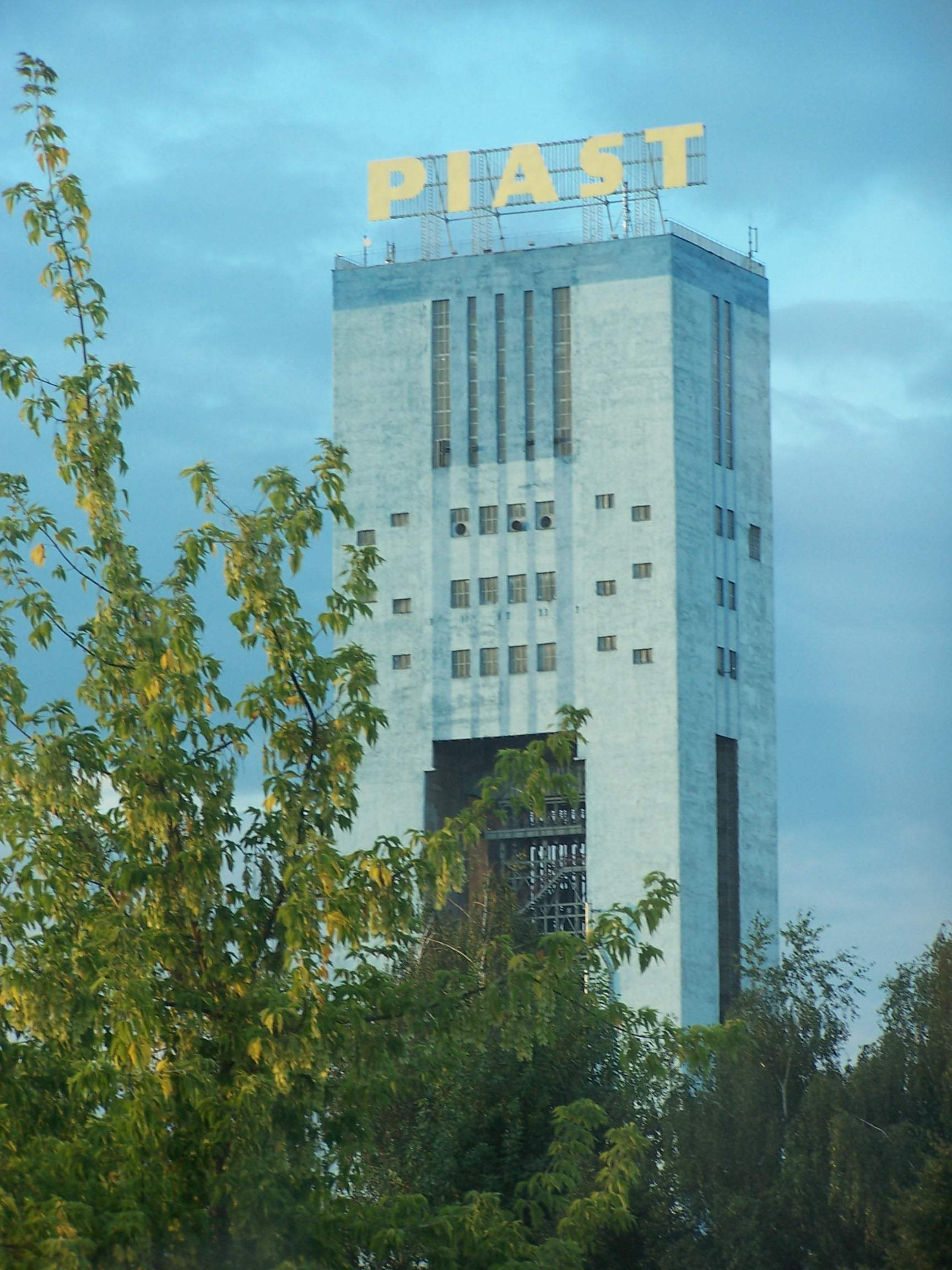
- Tower of mine "Piast" in Bieruń.
- Interactive map of Piast coal mine
- Location: Bieruń, Silesian Voivodeship, Poland
- Products: Coal
- Production: 5,000,000
- Opened: 1998
- Company: Kompania Węglowa

The Piast coal mine is a large mine in the south of Poland in Bieruń, Silesian Voivodeship, 310 km south-west of the capital, Warsaw. Piast represents one of the largest coal reserve in Poland having estimated reserves of 150 million tonnes of coal. The annual coal production is around 5 million tonnes.
