= Lublin July (1980) =

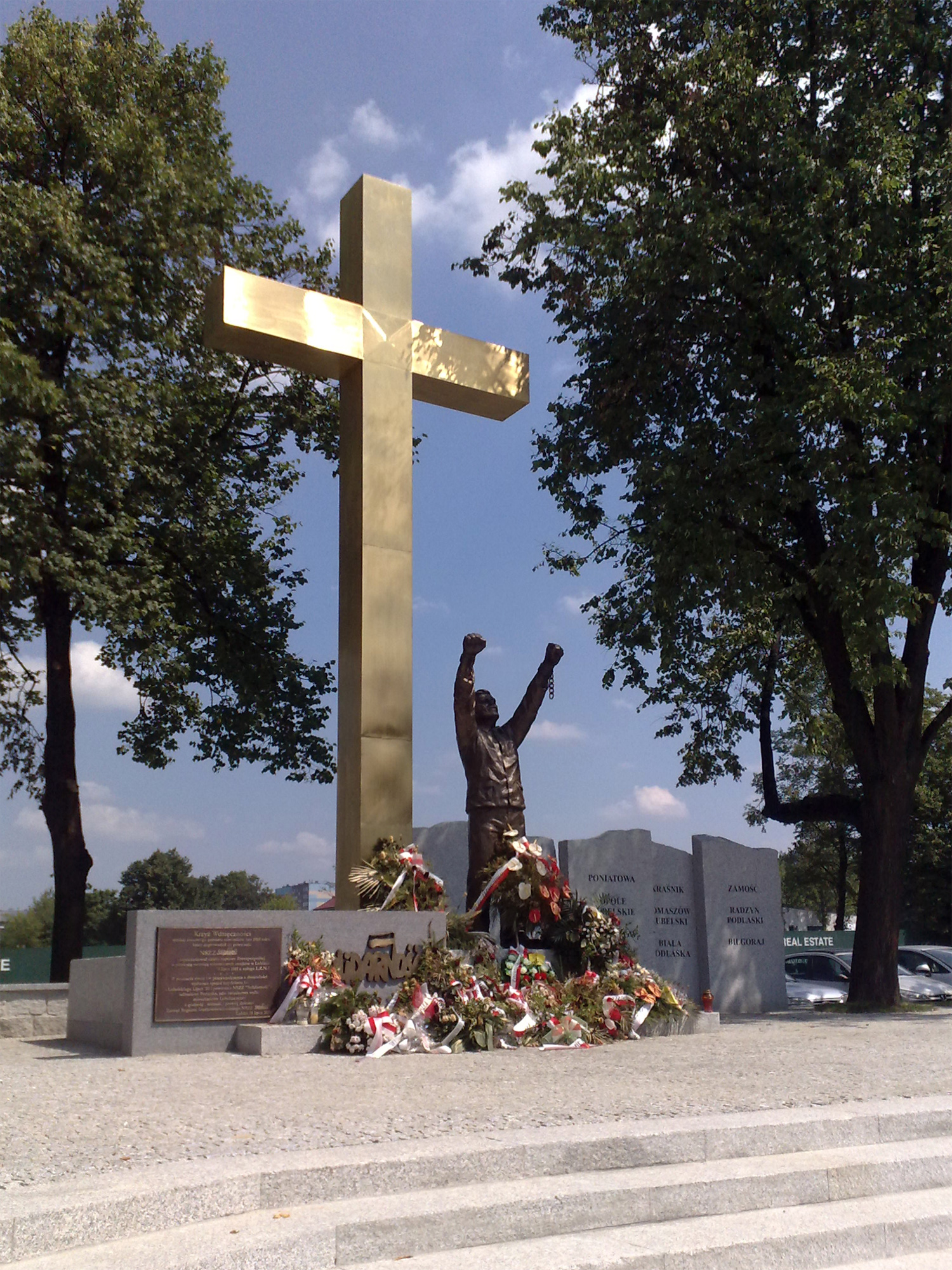
Memorial in Lublin

The 1980 Lublin strikes (also known as Lublin July, Polish: Lubelski Lipiec) were the series of workers' strikes in the eastern part of the city of Lublin (People's Republic of Poland), demanding better salaries and lower prices of food products. They began on July 8, 1980, at the State Aviation Works in Świdnik, a town located on the outskirts of Lublin. By mid-July, 1980, some 50,000 local workers from more than 150 enterprises went on strike. These strikes marked the beginning of important socio-political changes in Poland, such as the creation of Solidarity and democratization of the country, heralding a wave of protests later referred to as the August 1980 strikes.

== Background ==
On January 1, 1980, Edward Gierek, First Secretary of the Polish United Workers' Party, gave a New Year's speech in which he admitted that Poland was in an economic slump, adding that the difficulties had been caused both by drought in the summer of 1979 and by the severe winter of 1979-1980. More than a month later, on February 9, the Central Statistical Office disclosed data about Polish State revenue, announcing that compared to the previous year, it shrank by 2%. The growing crisis was also noticed by the Catholic Church. On February 18, Polish hierarchy with Primate Stefan Wyszynski, emphasized bad economic situation of the country and urged the government to talk to the nation.

In the following weeks, numerous price increases of several products were announced, such as gasoline, cigarettes, soft drinks, and then, on June 30, the nation was shocked to find out that a major increase in meat prices (up to 60%) had been announced. The increase also included the so-called meat products, available in canteens in Polish factories. Reaction of the workers was immediate. On the next day, strikes broke out in Warsaw's tractor plant Ursus, in the bus producer Autosan in Sanok, in the Communications Equipment Factory in Mielec, in the car component factory Polmo in Tczew and in the compressor plant Ponar in Tarnów. In the Ursus tractor factory, the workers organised assemblies, composed a list of demands, and elected a strike committee. They resisted the threat of firings and repression and carried on work stoppages throughout the following period.

On July 1, the Politburo of the Polish United Workers' Party gathered in Warsaw, but the protests were not even mentioned during talks. Meanwhile, major factories in Warsaw joined the strike - Warsaw Steelworks, Mera-Centrum and Polkolor, as well as the cotton plant Stella in Żyrardów.

== Lublin strikes ==
The first strike in the Lublin area took place on July 8, 1980, in the State Aviation Works PZL in Świdnik, in the Section W-340 of the factory. This was the beginning of the Lublin July, which later sparked the famous August 1980 wave of strikes in the cities on the Baltic coast. Norbert Wojciechowski, former Solidarity activist and spokesperson of the John Paul II Catholic University of Lublin says that the collapse of the Communist system of Poland did not start in the Gdańsk Shipyard in August 1980, but a month earlier in Lublin and Świdnik. Today, the factory in Świdnik is considered as the primary symbol of the social revolt of the year 1980, which led to the rise of Solidarity.

According to the strikers, it all began because of the price of pork chop dinner in the factory's canteen. On July 8, one worker noticed that overnight it had been increased by 80% - from zl 10.20, to zl 18.10. The workers, who for a long time had been complaining about prices and quality of food, decided that they had had enough. Following the inspiration of Miroslaw Kaczan who switched off the machines, Section W-340 was first, but after a few hours, the whole factory stopped working. On the same days, following Świdnik's example, workers of Lublin's branch of the state Polmozbyt auto parts and repairs service joined the strike. A Stoppage Committee was created in Świdnik, headed by Zofia Bartkiewicz, which demanded economic concessions. The workers did not use the irritating word strike on purpose.

On the next day, during the meeting of the Politburo in Warsaw, Edward Gierek assured the apparatchiks that the difficulties were "temporary". Meanwhile, the strikes quickly spread to other factories in Lublin and the surrounding region. Among striking plants, there were Factory of Agricultural Machines Agromet, Lublin Car Repairs Shop, Lublin's Truck Factory and Lublin's Leather Factory. Workers of the Truck Factory also created their Strike Committee of 80 members, and demanded, among other things, abolition of hard-currency shops and special outlets for privileged groups of society, as well as raising their family allowances to the levels received by the army and militia. Their strike was settled for much less than had been demanded.

On July 12, after its demands had been met, the Świdnik factory ended the strike, but by July 14, virtually the whole city of Lublin, together with the railroad network and city transit, came to a standstill. On strike were: Meat Factory, Lublin Factory of Scales, Poultry and Eggs Producer, City Transit Authority, Pharmaceutical and Herb Producer Herbapol, dairies, bakeries, the water heating plant, and even the Work Cooperative for the Blind. Lublin's rail workers began the strike on July 16 and, according to a legend, the railwaymen welded an engine to a track. Ultimately 150 factories employing 50,000 workers joined the strike. The rail workers were regarded as the most militant, and a key component of the strike, because earlier promises of pay rises to them had been broken by management. According to the CIA report, the situation was so serious that military vehicles were delivering food to stores and hospitals.

== Other locations ==
Even though the official mass media did not report the strikes, events of Lublin became known in the area. Soon afterwards, strikes began in such towns, as Chełm, Kraśnik, Lubartów, Opole Lubelskie, Puławy, Tomaszów Lubelski, Zamość and in the crucial rail junction of Dęblin. The strikes of the Lublin and Dęblin junctions paralyzed rail links between the Soviet Union and the Red Army garrisons in the German Democratic Republic. The direct reason for railway workers protesting was terrible working conditions. 'We repaired wagons in canals, completely smeared with mud', one of them recollected.

On July 18, one of sections of the Stalowa Wola Steelworks joined the strike, which spread across other sections. According to Mariusz Mucha, a journalist associated with Solidarity, altogether in the area of Lublin, 177 factories, with 80,000 employees joined the strike. The demands dealt with wage increases and the cancellation of the price rises. The government granted wage increases: 10% on average, sometimes as high as 20%. Furthermore, the increases were sometimes granted to strikers in advance in order to calm the movement.

During the strikes, the workers did not repeat the mistakes of the Poznań 1956 protests and the 1970 events in Pomerania and avoided going out on the streets, instead staying in their factories. They came to work, stood at the machines, and did not work. They managed to organise themselves, chose their representatives and negotiated to have their demands met.

== Aftermath ==
In most cases, the government was willing to resolve the strikes in favor of the workers, by "buying them off", so long as the strikers did not demand independent trade unions. The last strikes in Lublin ended on July 25, after a delegation of the government, together with Mieczysław Jagielski, Józef Pińkowski, and Zdzislaw Kurowski, agreed to most of the demands, such as free Saturdays, improvement in food supplies and earlier retirement age. The city was flooded with posters with appeals to the society for peace and return to work.

The events of Lublin in July 1980 brought a final break in the official, Communist so-called "propaganda of success" that systematically exaggerated the country's economic performance to keep the population in line. Even though they did not result in the creation of an independent trade union, they generated momentum for more strikes which soon spread throughout the entire country – on July 23, a strike began in the Cegielski Factories in Poznań, in Warsaw's Fabryka Samochodów Osobowych, then in Łódź, Ostrów Wielkopolski, and other cities. The compromise on salaries, worked out in Lublin and Świdnik, triggered a chain reaction as other workers demanded similar concessions. The process could not be stopped. Three weeks later the strikes on the Baltic coast started and there the workers successfully demanded political concessions. The result was the formation of independent trade unions and the beginning of the Solidarity movement.

== See also ==
- Poznań 1956 protests
- Polish 1970 protests
- 1971 Lodz strikes
- Upper Silesia 1980 strikes
- Bydgoszcz events
