= Stanisław Kania =

Polish politician; leader of Poland (1980–1981)

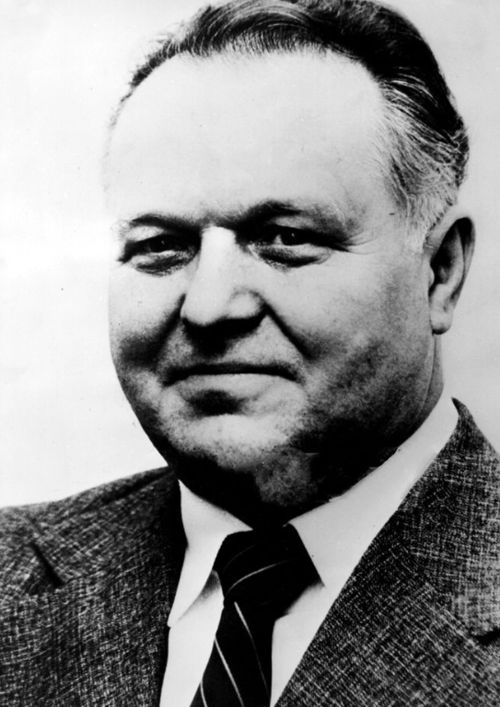
- Kania in 1979

First Secretary of the Polish United Workers' Party
- In office 6 September 1980 – 18 October 1981
- Preceded by: Edward Gierek
- Succeeded by: Wojciech Jaruzelski

Personal details
- Born: 8 March 1927 Wrocanka, Kraków Voivodeship, Poland
- Died: 3 March 2020 (aged 92) Warsaw, Poland
- Party: Polish United Workers' Party
- De facto leader of the PPR: ← Gierek; Jaruzelski →

Stanisław Kania (Polish pronunciation: [staˈɲiswaf ˈkaɲa]; 8 March 1927 – 3 March 2020) was a Polish communist politician who served as the de facto leader of the Polish People's Republic as First Secretary of the ruling Polish United Workers' Party (PZPR) between September 1980 and October 1981.

== Early life and career ==
Stanisław Kania was born on 8 March 1927 in Wrocanka, Jasło County in the Second Polish Republic into a working class family. Kania joined the Peasant Battalions in 1944 at 17 years-old and the Polish Workers' Party (PPR) in April 1945, when the Germans were driven out of Poland by the Red Army and Polish communists began to take control of the country. He partook in campaigns organised by the PPR, such as the Volunteer Reserve of the Citizens' Militia and the 1946 Polish people's referendum. Kania became deputy representative of the constituency for Jasło County and in February 1947 he was elected chairman of the Union of Youth Struggle (ZWM) board in Jasło. In December he was appointed head of the Rural Youth Department in Rzeszów. In 1948, the 21-year-old Kania was elected as delegate to the unification congress of the Polish United Workers' Party (PZPR). He attended courses at the PZPR's party school from 1950 to 1952 and was appointed head of the Rural Youth Department and to the main board of the ZWM. Kania was active in the Warsaw Provincial Committee from 1957 and became its Secretary in September 1960, a position he would hold until November 1968.

== Rise to prominence ==
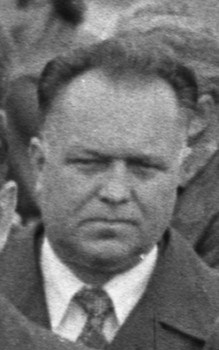
Stanisław Kania in 1974

Kania was elected a deputy member of the Central Committee of the PZPR in June 1964 before being elected a full member in November 1968. He was appointed head of the Central Committee's Administrative Department until becoming Secretary of the Central Committee in April 1971. Kania was elected to the Politburo of the PZPR in December 1975, effectively making him one of the most powerful men in Poland.

== First Secretary ==
On 6 September 1980, Kania was elected First Secretary when Edward Gierek was forced to resign for signing the Gdańsk Agreement with the Solidarity amidst much social and economic unrest in Poland. Gierek's actions were seen by some within the PZPR leadership as an attempt to renounce communism, and he was subsequently removed from power. Kania, having been the Central Committee's Secretary for most of Gierek's rule and a critic of his economic policies, was chosen to replace him. He admitted that the party had made many economic mistakes, advocated working with Catholic and trade unionist opposition groups, and met with Solidarity leader Lech Wałęsa and other critics of the PZPR. Kania's attempts at reconciliation with opposition groups in Poland were largely unsuccessful, losing the confidence of both the party and the public.

Kania resigned as First Secretary in October 1981, when a bug planted by the KGB caught him criticising the Soviet leadership, and was succeeded by General Wojciech Jaruzelski, the Chairman of the Council of Ministers (Prime Minister) and Minister of National Defence.

== Later life and death ==
In 2012, Kania was tried for his role in Jaruzelski's imposition of martial law in Poland in December 1981, but he was acquitted.

Kania died on 3 March 2020 of pneumonia and heart failure, five days before his 93rd birthday. At the time of his death, he was one of the last surviving leaders of a former Eastern Bloc country.

== Awards and decorations ==
- Order of the Builders of People's Poland (1977)
- Order of the Banner of Labour, 1st Class
- Order of the Banner of Labour, 2nd Class (1969)
- Officer's Cross of Order of Polonia Restituta
- Knight's Cross of Order of Polonia Restituta (1954)
- Partisan Cross
- Medal of the 30th Anniversary of People's Poland (1974)
- Medal of the 10th Anniversary of People's Poland (1955)
- Golden Medal of Merit for National Defence
- Silver Medal of Merit for National Defence
- Bronze Medal of Merit for National Defence
- Medal of Ludwik Waryński (1988)
- Jubilee Medal "Thirty Years of Victory in the Great Patriotic War 1941–1945" (USSR, 1975)
- Medal of 90th Anniversary of the Birth of Georgi Dimitrov (Bulgaria, 1972)

Party political offices
Preceded by Edward Gierek	General Secretary of the Polish United Workers' Party; 1980–1981	Succeeded by Wojciech Jaruzelski
