= Martial law in Poland =

1981–83 period of repression

- Part of the Polish crisis of 1980–1981 and the Cold War
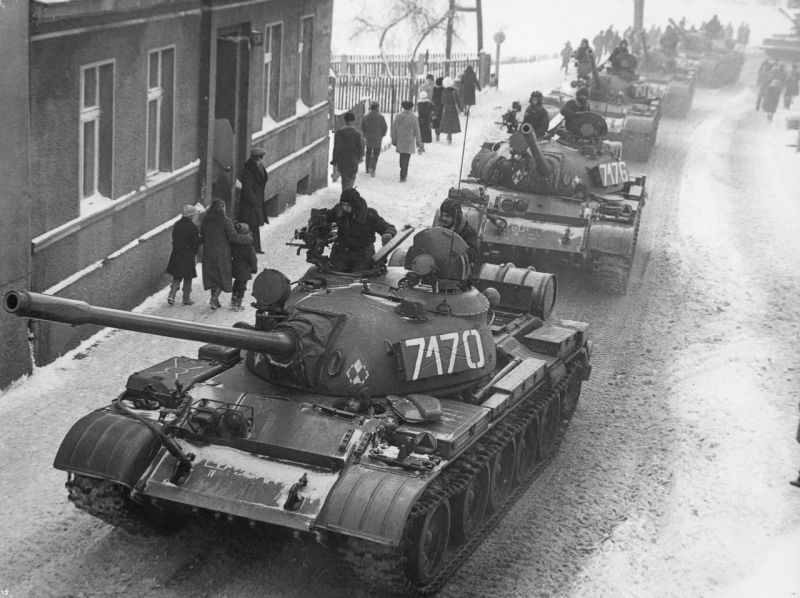
- Polish T-55 tanks enter the town of Zbąszyń while moving east towards Poznań, 13 December 1981
Date	13 December 1981 – 22 July 1983 (1 year, 7 months, 1 week and 2 days)
Location	Polish People's Republic
Result	Polish government victory: Crackdown on opposition; Protests suppressed; Deepened economic crisis; Continued resistance and financial support from foreign countries until 1989 leading to Solidarity victory

Belligerents
Polish People's Republic; Polish United Workers' Party; Polish People's Army; Citizens' Militia (MO); Motorized Reserves of the Citizens' Militia; Security Service (SB); Pro-government protesters; Supported by: Soviet Union (intelligence support and military equipment)	(Polish People's Republic) Polish opposition; Solidarity (Solidarność); Fighting Solidarity (from 1982); Anti-government protesters; Government defectors; Catholic Church in Poland; Supported by: Polish government-in-exile United States (financial support); Central Intelligence Agency; United Kingdom (financial support); Vatican City (financial support)

Commanders and leaders
(Polish People's Republic) Wojciech Jaruzelski: Military Council of National Salvation	(Polish government-in-exile) Lech Wałęsa

Strength
Initial strength: 80,000 soldiers; 30,000 policemen; 1,750 tanks; 1,900 combat vehicles; 9,000 cars	23,000 members of Solidarity, protesters, governmental defectors and other unprivileged belligerents armed mostly with small arms

Casualties and losses
1 killed; over 20 injured	91 killed; Thousands arrested

Martial law in Poland (Polish: Stan wojenny w Polsce) was in effect between 13 December 1981 and 22 July 1983. The government of the Polish People's Republic drastically restricted everyday life by introducing martial law and a military junta in an attempt to counter political opposition, in particular the Solidarity movement.

Since the late 1970s, Poland had been in a deep economic recession. Edward Gierek, First Secretary of the Polish United Workers' Party (PZPR), had obtained a series of large loans from foreign creditors to achieve better economic output. This instead resulted in a domestic crisis. Essential goods were heavily rationed, which acted as a stimulus to establishing the first anticommunist trade union in the Eastern Bloc, known as Solidarity (Polish: Solidarność), in 1980. Gierek, who permitted the trade union to appear per the Gdańsk Agreement, was dismissed from his post less than a month later and confined to house arrest. Following countless strikes and demonstrations by employees of chief industrial regions, Poland was heading towards bankruptcy. The new First Secretary, General Wojciech Jaruzelski, was determined to end the demonstrations by force if necessary.

On 13 December 1981, Jaruzelski announced the imposition of martial law in a televised speech, following the vote of the Council of State the previous day which formally authorised its introduction. An extraconstitutional military junta, the Military Council of National Salvation (WRON), was formed to rule Poland during the time. The Polish People's Army, Citizens' Militia (MO), special paramilitary units of the Motorized Reserves of the Citizens' Militia ("ZOMO"), and tanks were deployed on the streets to demoralize demonstrators, conduct street patrols, control strategic enterprises, and maintain a strict curfew. Intercity travel without a permit was forbidden, food shortages intensified, and censorship was placed on all media and correspondence. The Security Service (Służba Bezpieczeństwa, or SB) wiretapped phones in public booths and state institutions. Thousands of opposition activists were imprisoned without trial, and although martial law was lifted in 1983, many political prisoners were not released until a general amnesty in 1986. The crackdown on the opposition led the Reagan Administration to introduce economic sanctions against Poland and the Soviet Union, further worsening the former's economy.

Some protests appeared in response to the introduction of martial law. On 16 December, the Pacification of Wujek, when ZOMO squads pacified the pro-Solidarity miners' strike in the Wujek Coal Mine in the industrial city of Katowice, killed nine demonstrators. Other demonstrations across Poland were dispersed by the military or paramilitary units, which utilized water cannons, tear gas, batons, truncheons, and clubs, killing 91 people in total. However, this figure is uncertain and is still debated among historians. Martial law succeeded in marginalising the Solidarity movement, which would largely remain on the sidelines until the late 1980s. As fewer people engaged in anti-government demonstrations, martial law was suspended on 31 December 1982, based on a resolution adopted on 19 December and was formally lifted by a resolution of the Council of State on 22 July 1983, the National Day of the Rebirth of Poland, following an appeal of the Military Council of National Salvation.

In 2011, the majority of Poles still considered the imposition of martial law to be justified (51% versus 27%).

== Prelude ==
=== Reforms of Edward Gierek (1970–1975) ===
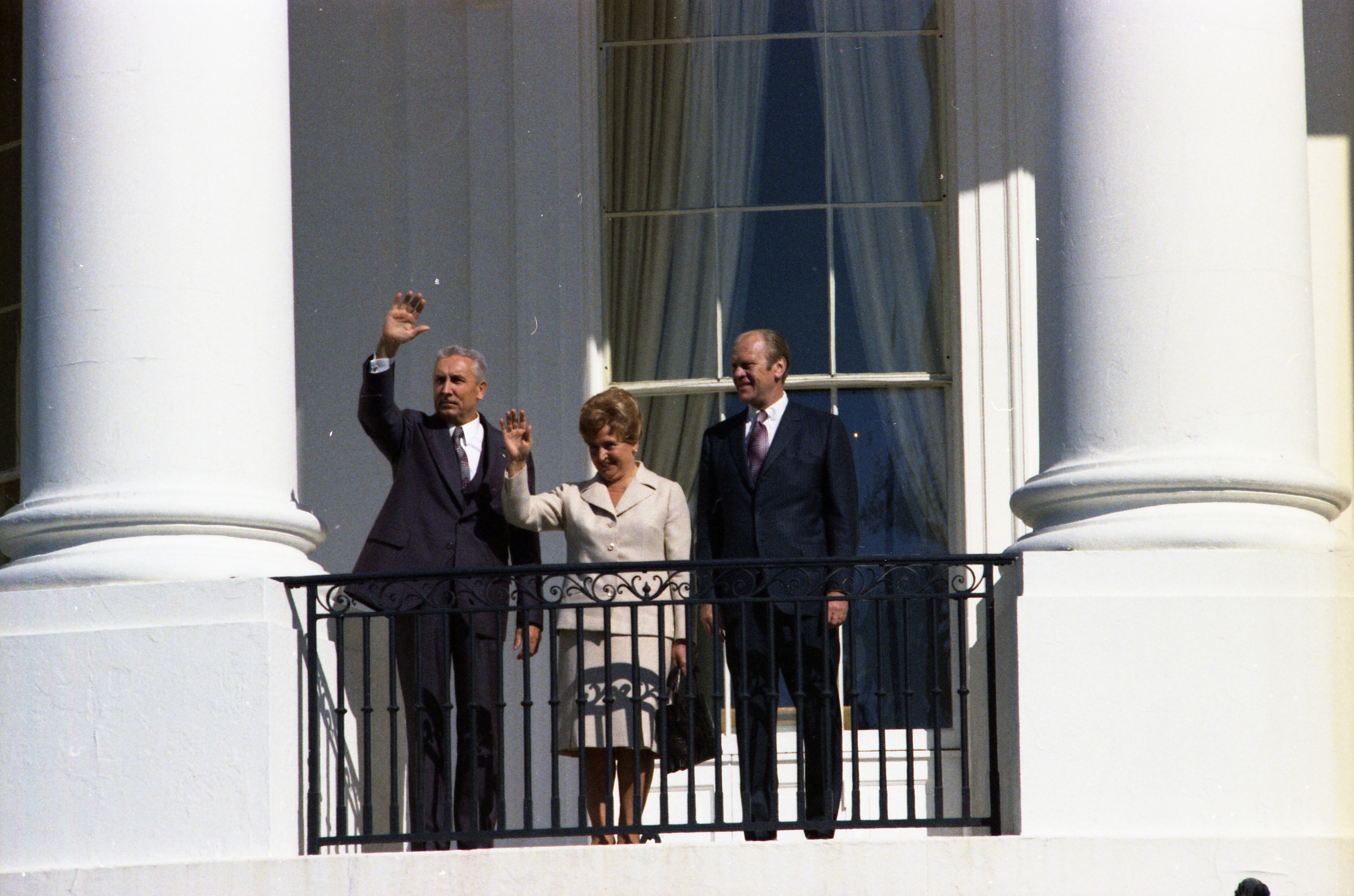
Gierek in the White House with President Gerald Ford, 1974

When Edward Gierek succeeded Władysław Gomułka as the head of state in 1970, he took decisive measures to boost economic growth and develop modern infrastructure. Gierek, a more liberal figure than his predecessor, promised to make Poland the wealthiest and most economically significant communist country of the Eastern Bloc. However, these ideas prompted resistance from hardline communist leadership as the reform would effectively abandon the fundamental principles of a centrally planned Marxist economy. The grip and emphasis on state-owned enterprises and state-controlled prices or trade were eventually loosened. Small private businesses began to appear and Poland recorded temporary growth in GDP and an improvement in living conditions.

Gierek maintained close ties with the United States, which he subsequently used for diplomatic and economic purposes. In order to continue with the reforms, large sums of money were borrowed from creditors in the Western Bloc. These sequential and uninterrupted loans were primarily targeted at establishing heavy industry, mines or manufacturing facilities that would produce goods for export. The projected income from the exports would then be used to pay off the debt. Apart from financing the economic sector, the money was spent on social housing and on expanding road connections, for example the first fully operational highway linking Warsaw with industrial Silesia was opened for traffic in 1976. Furthermore, over 1.8 million large-panel-system flats were constructed to house the growing population. Agricultural output rose by nearly 22% between 1971 and 1975, and industrial production by 10.5% annually. Gierek also initiated the construction of Warszawa Centralna railway station, Europe's most modern railway station at the time.

=== Crisis; debt, rationing and shortages (1976–1981) ===
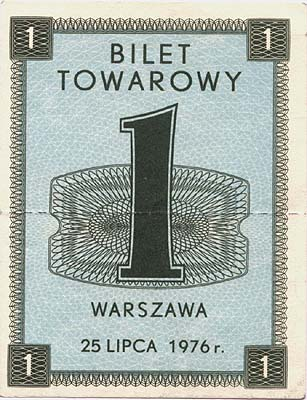
A ration card for sugar, 1976

As expenditures increased and debts accumulated, foreign creditors refrained from granting Poland loans. Moreover, the 1973 and 1979 oil crises, along with the June 1976 protests affected the fragile economy. Due to previous GDP growth, higher income and expanded industries, the demand for certain goods and consumption surged. New factories and state enterprises required imported fuel, materials and a workforce to operate production lines. Soon, the country started exporting locally produced stock designated for domestic use, thus resulting in widespread shortages. Because the remaining assets were directed at production, exports and debt repayment, the state also reduced imports to minimize expenses.

In 1976, the communist government introduced ration cards for sugar, with meat, dairy and processed food following. Confectionery, cocoa, coffee, rice, tobacco and other imported goods were so heavily rationed that they were almost permanently unavailable. Due to the constant lack of tobacco, ordinary cigarettes became a form of new currency on the black market. The living standards began to sharply decline; the supply of imported goods was kept to a low minimum and the country was forced to export everything it could, including coal necessary for basic heating and power plants. Power outages were commonplace. By 1980, the debt amounted to over US$23 billion, then almost half of Poland's nominal GDP.

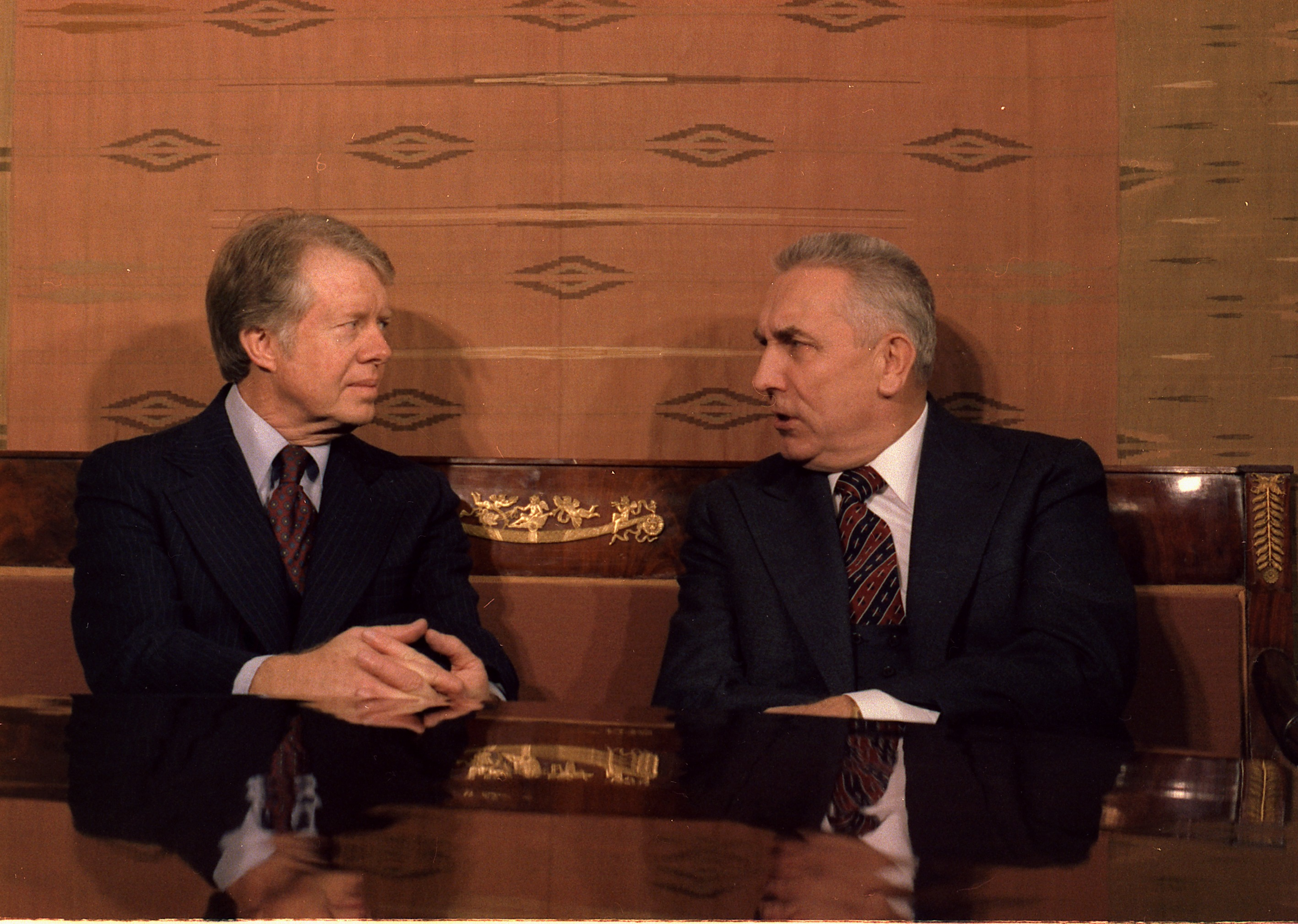
Edward Gierek (right) with President Jimmy Carter (left) during his state visit to Warsaw, 1977. The loans were among the chief topics discussed.

At the same time, the newly founded Solidarity movement, led by Lech Wałęsa, encouraged farmers to refrain from selling agricultural products (wheat, grain, fruit and others) to the state as a sign of protest. The shortage of goods on the market and in stores was worsened by production being occasionally halted due to the strikes organized by Solidarity. In 1980, the national income fell by 6% compared to the previous year, and in 1981 by 12%. The number of exports declined by 4.2%. Mismanagement and wastefulness were abundant.

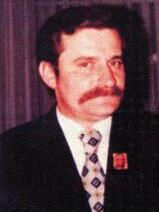
Opposition leader Lech Wałęsa in 1981

On 6 September 1980, Gierek was dismissed from his office, expelled from the Polish United Workers' Party (possibly under pressure from the Soviet Union) and falsely charged with corruption. A year later, on 10 September 1981, the Soviet authorities informed the Polish government that in connection with the prevailing situation in Poland the USSR would cut oil supply to Poland by 64% and gas by 47%. The import of diesel from the Soviet Union was terminated immediately. This action was intended to force the Polish communist authorities to suppress the demonstrations and dissolve Solidarity. The situation was already dire and gradually worsened, which only fueled anti-communist sentiment. A civil war was hanging by a thread.

In 1981, Poland notified the Paris Club about its insolvency, which caught the attention of the entire world.

== Introduction, restrictions, patrols ==
=== Secret preparations and provocation ===
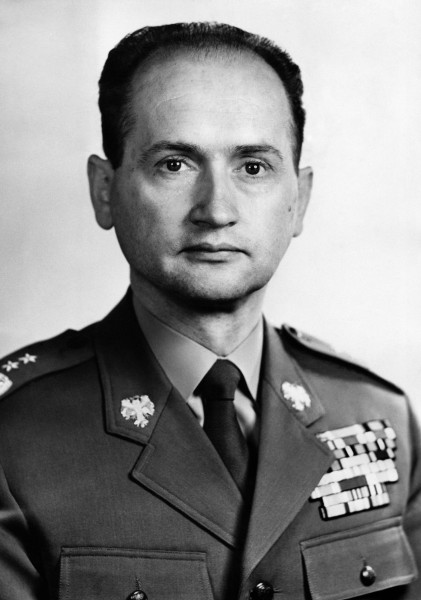
General Jaruzelski was determined to suppress any opposition along with the Solidarity Movement.

After the short tenure of Stanisław Kania, General and Minister of Defence Wojciech Jaruzelski was chosen as the new first secretary. Before assuming office, Jaruzelski ordered the Polish General Staff to update plans for nationwide martial law on 22 October 1980. In November 1980, the Ministry of Internal Affairs planned to potentially facilitate thousands of oppositionists in state prisons and places of internment.

On 5 December 1980, Kania spoke of the preparations relating to martial law at the Warsaw Pact Summit in Moscow. He presented his own view of how to weaken Solidarity and insisted that a "psychological-operational method" would be most appropriate to prevent violence. This method included strong propaganda against the movement and deploying secret services (SB) to go undercover and infiltrate Solidarity headquarters in the hope of creating internal conflicts within the opposition. General Jaruzelski was not fully satisfied with the plan, and, in case of failure, already planned radical actions involving the army. Stanisław Kania warned Brezhnev that an armed intervention from the Soviet side to aid Jaruzelski would be met "with a violent reaction, or even with a national uprising" that would shake the politics of the Eastern Bloc.

Zbigniew Brzezinski, chief security advisor to US president Jimmy Carter, stated that if the Soviet Union undertook an armed intervention in Poland, the US would strike back in a riposte manner. According to historian and publicist Paul Kengor, then-US president Ronald Reagan considered sending American troops to Poland to scare off the Soviets. This claim was not supported by Brzezinski nor by Richard Pipes from Harvard University. Kengor then elaborated that Reagan eventually abandoned the plan after he was convinced by his own advisors that the US army stationed across Europe was less capable and much weaker than the Soviet forces. The United States eventually struck back with economic sanctions against Poland and the USSR.

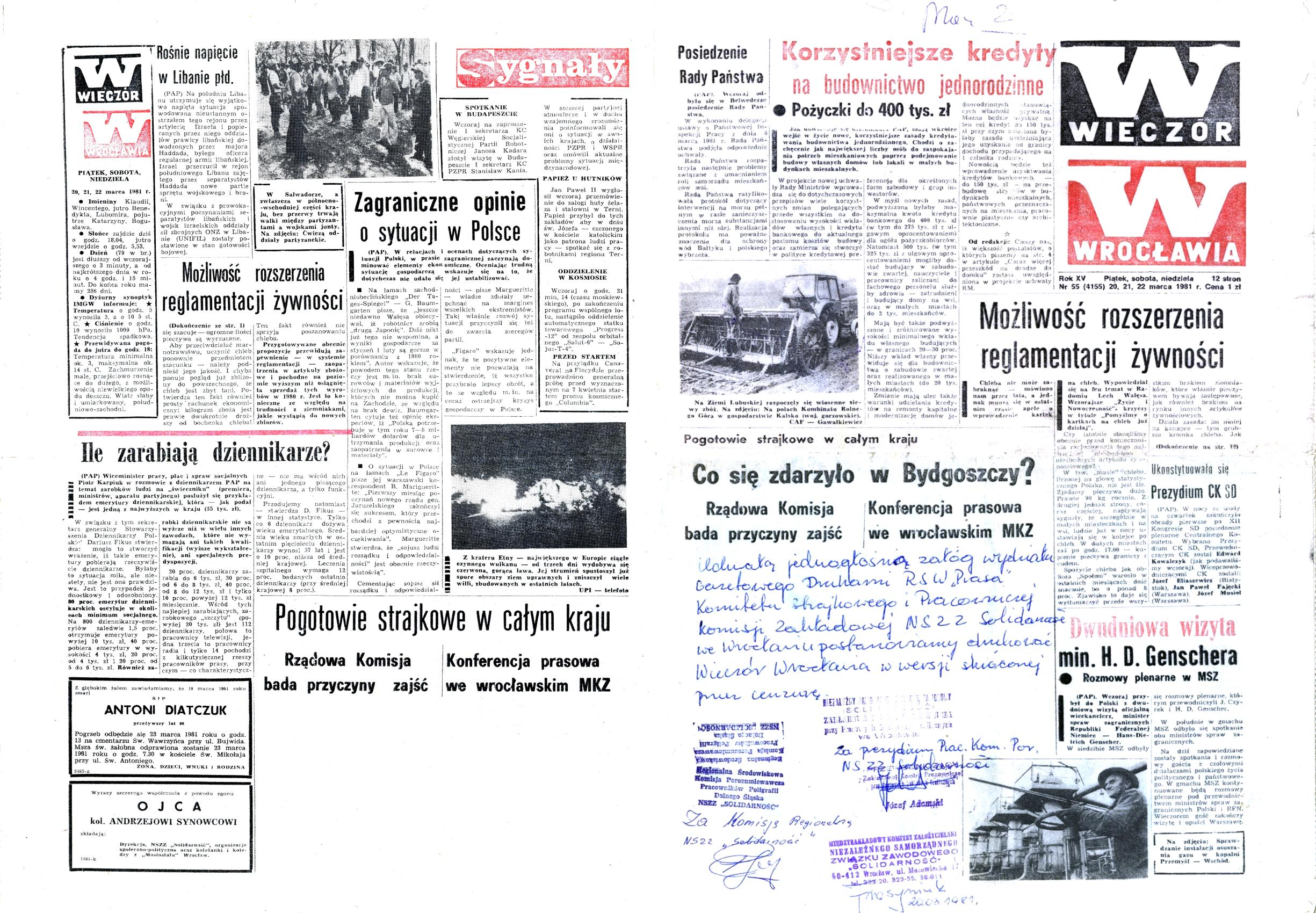
A censored regional newspaper that reported about the Bydgoszcz events, in which the militia abused Solidarity members. The censorship was to prevent the slander of state services.

In February 1981, the Ministry of National Defence and Ministry of the Internal Affairs carried out a training scenario, the purpose of which was to explore how martial law would be introduced. The ministries agreed that martial law should be preceded by appropriate propaganda calling for its support, and the decision itself should be based on a pretext that it would bring social stability and peace. It was also highlighted that martial law must occur before the fully mobilized Fighting Solidarity and its allies organize a general strike that would paralyze the entire country. By March, the situation escalated after the Bydgoszcz events, in which local Solidarity delegates invited for a regional national council meeting in Bydgoszcz to discuss potential strikes were beaten and abused by the citizens' militia (MO). The event, which was to feature in newspapers as a provocation, was concealed by censors. On 27 March, Solidarity organized a warning strike directed at the government, but, on 30 March, Lech Wałęsa met with Mieczysław Rakowski and a compromise was achieved. The general strike was called off and the situation stabilized for a short period.

In July, the Soviets increased their military presence in the military base at Borne Sulinowo, where the Red Army was stationed per Warsaw Pact agreement as in all other Eastern Bloc countries. Without notifying the Polish authorities, the Soviets unexpectedly sent over 600 tanks to Borne Sulinowo. A month later, commander-in-chief of the Warsaw Pact, Viktor Kulikov, requested that Soviet military advisors be placed in the Polish General Staff and assigned to nearly all Polish regiments. It is suspected that Kulikov, acting on behalf of the Soviet Union, was tasked with sending undercover KGB agents to monitor the situation in Poland from the Polish military's perspective. His request, however, was immediately denied by the Polish government.

Over 25,000 posters announcing martial law were secretly printed in the Soviet Union, transported to Poland by airplane and hidden in the large building housing the Ministry of Internal Affairs. The full extent of the actions undertaken by Jaruzelski to instigate martial law was not known by even some of the highest notables in the Central Committee of the Polish United Workers' Party or the Polish Sejm.

=== 12–13 December 1981; Operations Fir and Azalea ===
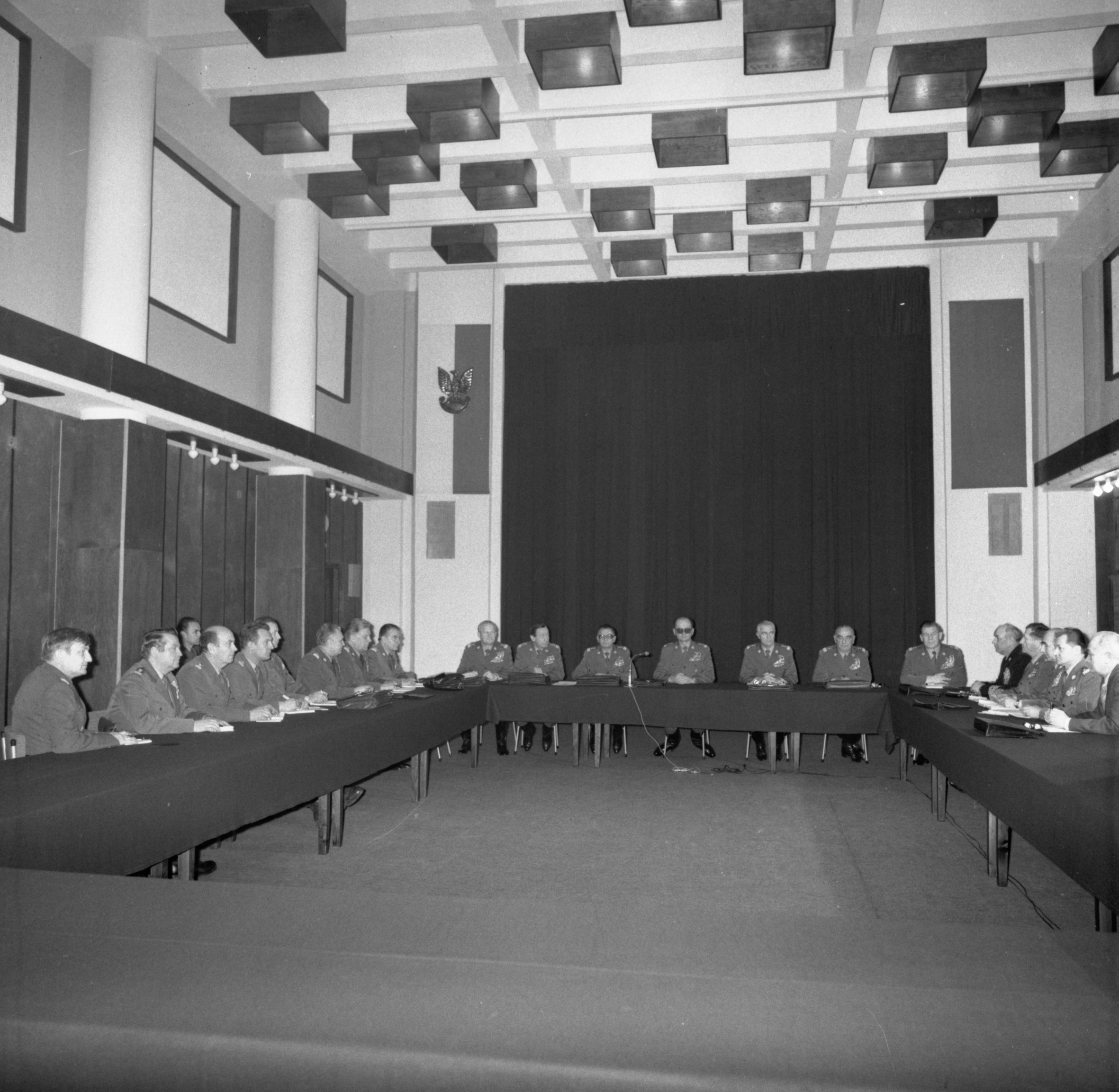
The Military Council of National Salvation (WRON), which was founded on 13 December and presided over the military junta. Its Polish abbreviation "WRONa" means a crow bird, and members of the council were known to the opposition as evil "Crows".

On 12 December 1981, shortly before midnight, the Polish Council of State gathered in Warsaw's Belweder Palace and approved nationwide martial law. Simultaneously, the Military Council of National Salvation (WRON) was founded and its members were high-ranking generals or military officers in the Polish People's Army, who were in charge of the military junta. The generals and officers later became known to the public as evil "Crows", in relation to the Polish name of the council. (The abbreviation WRON is similar to the Polish noun Wrona, which means "Crow")

At precisely 00:00 (12:00 a.m.), the Motorized Reserves of the Citizens' Militia (ZOMO) began "Akcja Jodła" (English: Operation Fir) and arrested the first members of Solidarity who were at close reach. They were then placed in previously prepared detention facilities. In total, between 70,000 and 80,000 soldiers of the People's Army and 30,000 functionaries of the Ministry of Internal Affairs (including SB, ZOMO and the militia) were deployed for action. Around 1,750 tanks, 1,900 armoured combat vehicles, 500 militarized transport units, 9,000 cars and several helicopter squadrons were in service. Twenty-five per cent of all units concentrated in the capital, Warsaw, or in surrounding localities.

Preceding Jodła was "Akcja Azalia" (English: Operation Azalea), which began at around 22:30 (10:30 p.m.) on 12 December. Per Azalea, the SB secret services, paramilitary troops, the Militia, ZOMO and Border Protection Troops stormed 451 telecommunications exchange facilities and cut telephone lines to allegedly prevent the spread of misinformation. However, the operation's true purpose was preventing Solidarity from contacting its branches in other cities to mobilize protesters. Radio and television stations were also besieged. Any volunteers wishing to assist in the arrests were drafted into ORMO.

At 6:00 a.m., Polskie Radio began broadcasting information about the martial law being imposed, followed by the speech made by General Jaruzelski. The Telewizja Polska network and its chief news program Dziennik (English: Journal) aired the speech in a slightly modified version. The declaration was watched by millions of Polish citizens despite the early hour.

=== 16 December 1981; Wujek Coal Mine ===
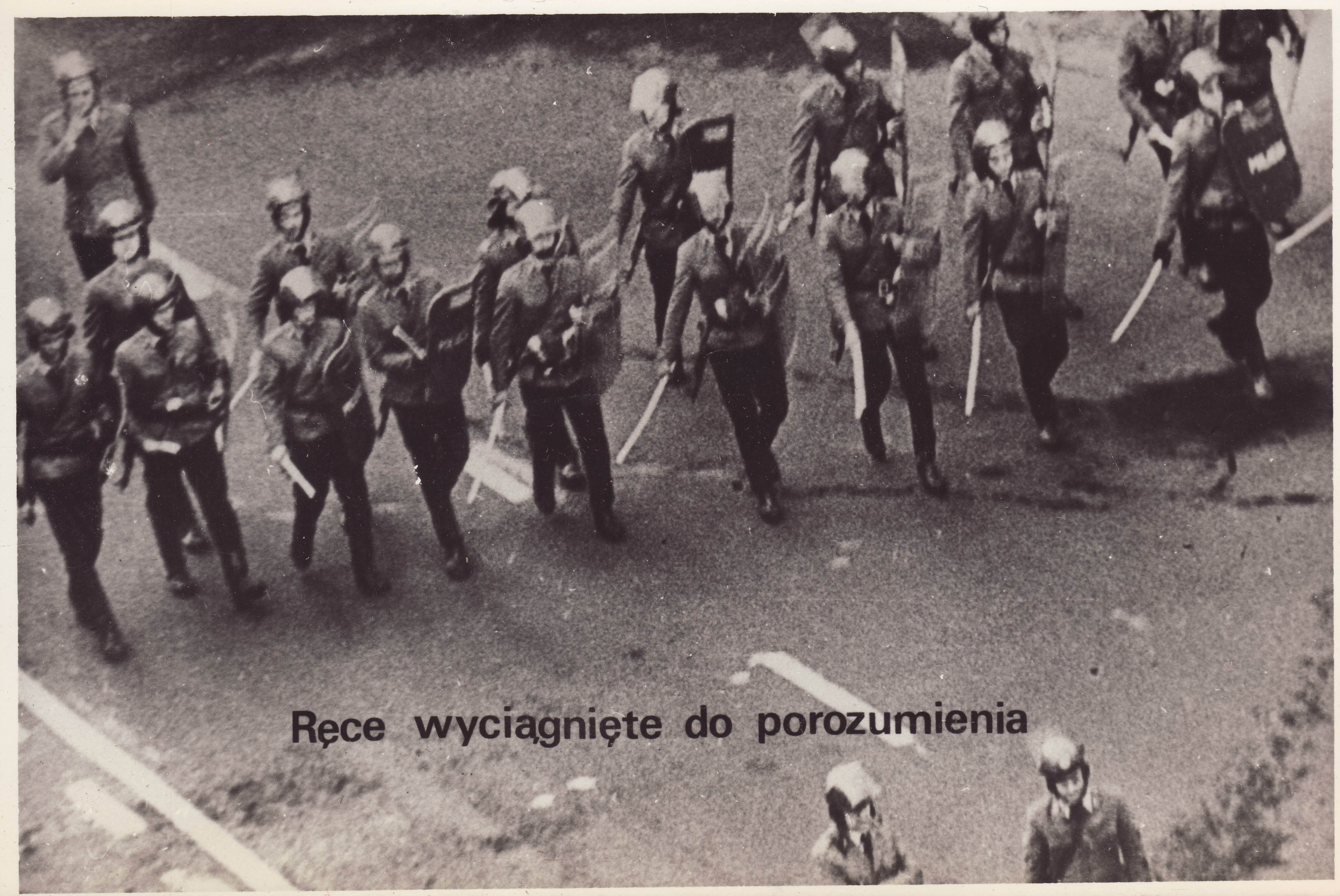
ZOMO squads with police batons preparing to disperse and beat protesters. The sarcastic caption reads "outstretched hands of understanding" or "outstretched hands for agreement", with batons ironically symbolizing hands.

Three days after restrictions were imposed, miners at the Wujek Coal Mine in the industrial city of Katowice began striking against the declaration of martial law by General Jaruzelski. Most of the miners and workers at Wujek were allied with the Solidarity Movement, with its leaders boycotting the state industries. Furthermore, coal was a precious fuel source that was used for generating electricity and heat, as well as a major export material. By selling and exporting coal, the communist government obtained enough money to gradually pay off the outstanding debt. However, as Solidarity boycotted the mines in Silesia and demonstrations became more frequent, the production level dropped considerably, along with revenue.

Jaruzelski perceived this as a threat to both state security and the economy. The forces used in the thrust consisted of eight ZOMO squads supported by ORMO, seven water cannons, three regiments with infantry combat vehicles and one tank regiment. It was decided that the situation was far too serious for moral considerations to guide how the miners should be dealt with. Instead, the well-equipped ZOMO and army troops fired at the protesters with a "shoot to kill" technique. Twenty-one were wounded, eight were killed on the spot and one died in hospital, with the youngest victim being 19 years old. The remaining crowd was violently dispersed. The miners repeatedly fought back with their work tools and, in retaliation, wounded dozens of soldiers and militiamen. It was one of the deadliest single incidents during the martial law period.

=== Gdańsk, Kraków, Lublin and continuing protests ===
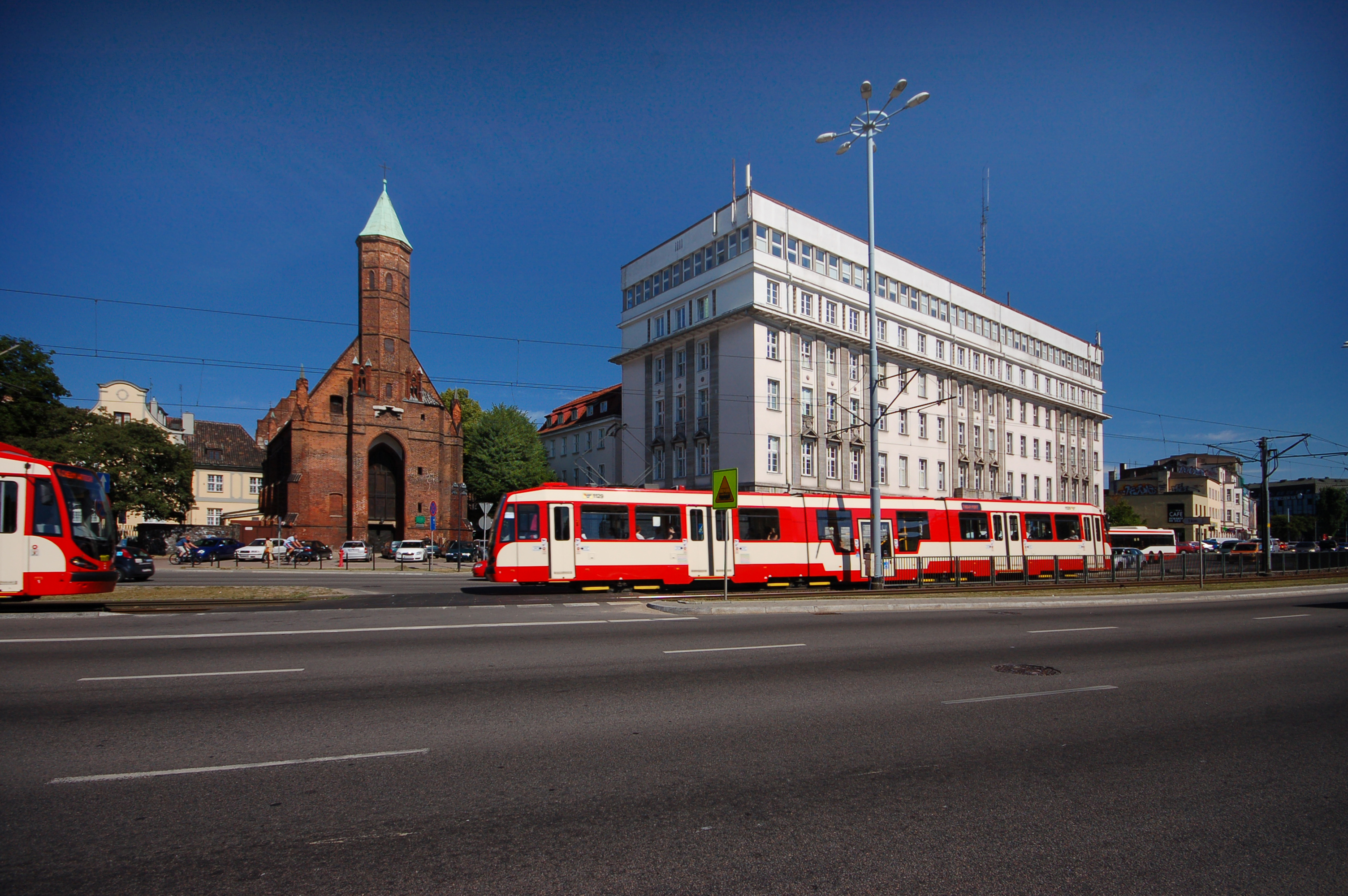
The former PZPR headquarters in Gdańsk (right). ZOMO machine-gunned demonstrators from the rooftop.

On the same day as Wujek was pacified, a 30,000-strong demonstration was held in the northern port city of Gdańsk. Clashes with ZOMO continued until 17 December and over 324 individuals were injured. The Militia used firearms and machine guns when the crowd approached the Polish United Workers' Party headquarters in Gdańsk. A short and presumably cautionary gun salvo from the building's roof hit several people and wounded four. One participant was killed. The southern city of Kraków was also witnessing heavy demonstrations, with thousands marching on the street demanding an end to the martial law and communist rule.

On the night of 29–30 April 1982, local miners in Wodzisław Śląski planted a bomb and blew up a monument dedicated to Soviet soldiers who took control of Poland from the Nazis in 1945. It was the only incident involving explosives and the caught perpetrators became subsequently known as "Bombers from Silesia" (Polish: "Bombowcy ze Śląska"). The operation was a success as the monument was never reconstructed, though the bombers were sentenced and jailed soon after. Other suspects and hundreds of other miners across Silesia were sacked, which further weakened the economy.

In May 1982, the protests convened by Solidarity were receiving less attention and the struggle against the government was evidently weakening. However, by August, social unrest had again surged. On 31 August 1982, demonstrations took place in around 66 towns and cities, with at least 18 in the southwestern province of Lower Silesia. In Wrocław, one of the main centers of Fighting Solidarity, several thousand people for many hours clashed with ZOMO units. One demonstrator was killed by a bullet. On 14 August 1982, in an event known as "Bloody Saturday", the most brutal pacification of the ZOMO took place in the Kwidzyn internment camp located in the territory of the city's prison. For five hours, the riot police beat the prisoners. Some had the marks of 50 baton blows on their backs. A selection took place in the recreation room. The selected internees were herded through the "health path" - a line of beating riot police. 80 prisoners were severely beaten, 20 were taken to hospital, and three were crippled. Several victims of beatings died after being released. On 6 September 1982, 6 previously beaten prisoners were arrested and sentenced to prison terms ranging from one and a half to two years.

The copper-mining town of Lubin also became a hotspot for Solidarity-led rallies. On 31 August 1982, the gathered people sang the Polish national anthem and chanted slurs and slogans against the communist regime, against the military junta with Jaruzelski at its head and against the Soviets. After approximately 30 minutes, the rally of 2,000 was surrounded by the Militia, armed with AK-47 assault rifles. In response, agitated protesters shouted slurs such as "pigs", "bandits", "Gestapo", "murderers" and "servants of Brezhnev". An unsuccessful attempt was made at building a barricade, but the government units were able to pass through and dispersed the first group with tear gas. When the demonstrators regrouped and formed a second wave, ZOMO opened fire, killing two men. The now infuriated crowd began continuous attacks and the Militia shot several more times, injuring one more man at the back of his head. He died in the hospital a few days later. Reinforcements were sent from Legnica, and the new deployees were organized into so-called "raid groups" in Nysa vans. These groups roamed the streets, often attacking casual passers-by. Immediately after the protest was pacified, security forces began the destruction of any evidence to conceal the crime. During the night of 31 August – 1 September, the streets were cleared, with all shells and bullets taken for analysis. On 2 September, authorities ordered the repairs of damaged buildings; broken windows were replaced and traces of bullets on the walls were covered with plaster. The investigation, despite consistent statements made by witnesses of the massacre, was closed.

To avoid further escalation, Lech Wałęsa was released from custody in a detention camp on 14 November. Following his release, no major demonstration took place.

=== Law, rules and censorship ===
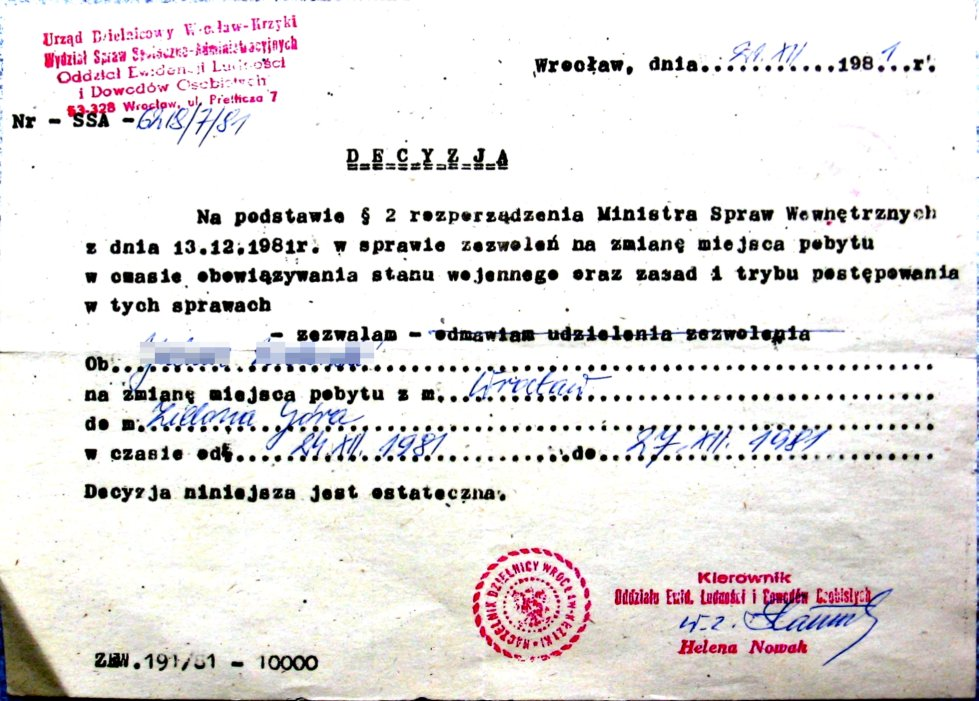
An intercity travel pass, 1981

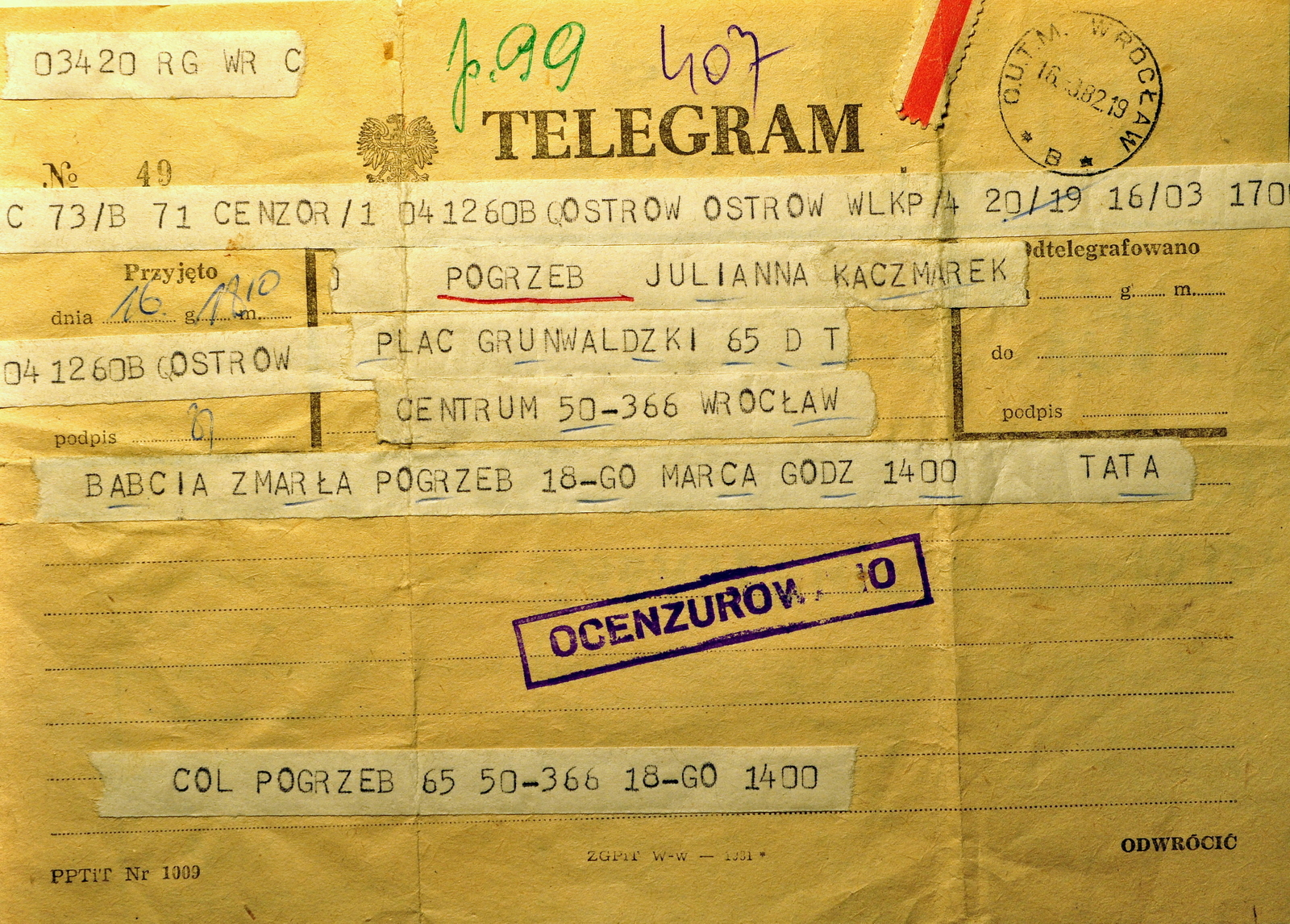
A censored telegram, 1982

From the very beginning in December 1981, a strict curfew was imposed from 19:00 (7:00 p.m.) until 6 in the morning. The time of curfew was later adjusted to 22:00 (10:00 p.m.)–06:00. Night walks or escapades were forbidden and street patrols were commonplace. The WRON Military Council sealed off the country's borders, closed all airports and road access to main cities was restricted. Special permission passes were issued for individuals in extraordinary cases. Telephone lines were disconnected, correspondence saw renewed postal censorship, all independent political organizations were criminalized and lessons in schools and universities temporarily suspended.

The government imposed a six-day workweek while the mass media, public services, healthcare services, power stations, coal mines, seaports, railway stations, and most key factories were placed under military management, with employees having to follow military orders or face a court-martial. As part of the crackdown, media and educational institutions underwent "verification", a process that tested each employee's attitude towards the regime and to the Solidarity movement; as a result, thousands of journalists, teachers and professors were banned from their professions. Military courts were established to bypass the normal court system, to imprison those spreading fake news. In an attempt to crush resistance, civilian phone lines were routinely tapped and monitored by government agents.

=== Synopsis ===
During the initial imposition of martial law, several dozen people were killed. Official reports during the crackdown claimed about a dozen fatalities, while a parliamentary commission in the years 1989–1991 arrived at a figure of over 90. Others were also killed and wounded during a massive second wave of demonstrations on 31 August 1982.

At the invitation of Jaruzelski, a delegation of the ruling Hungarian Socialist Workers' Party visited Poland between 27 and 29 December. The Hungarians shared with their Polish colleagues their experiences on crushing the "counterrevolution" of 1956. Earlier in Autumn 1981, Telewizja Polska had broadcast a special film on the events of 1956 in Hungary, showing, among others, scenes of rebels hanging security officers.

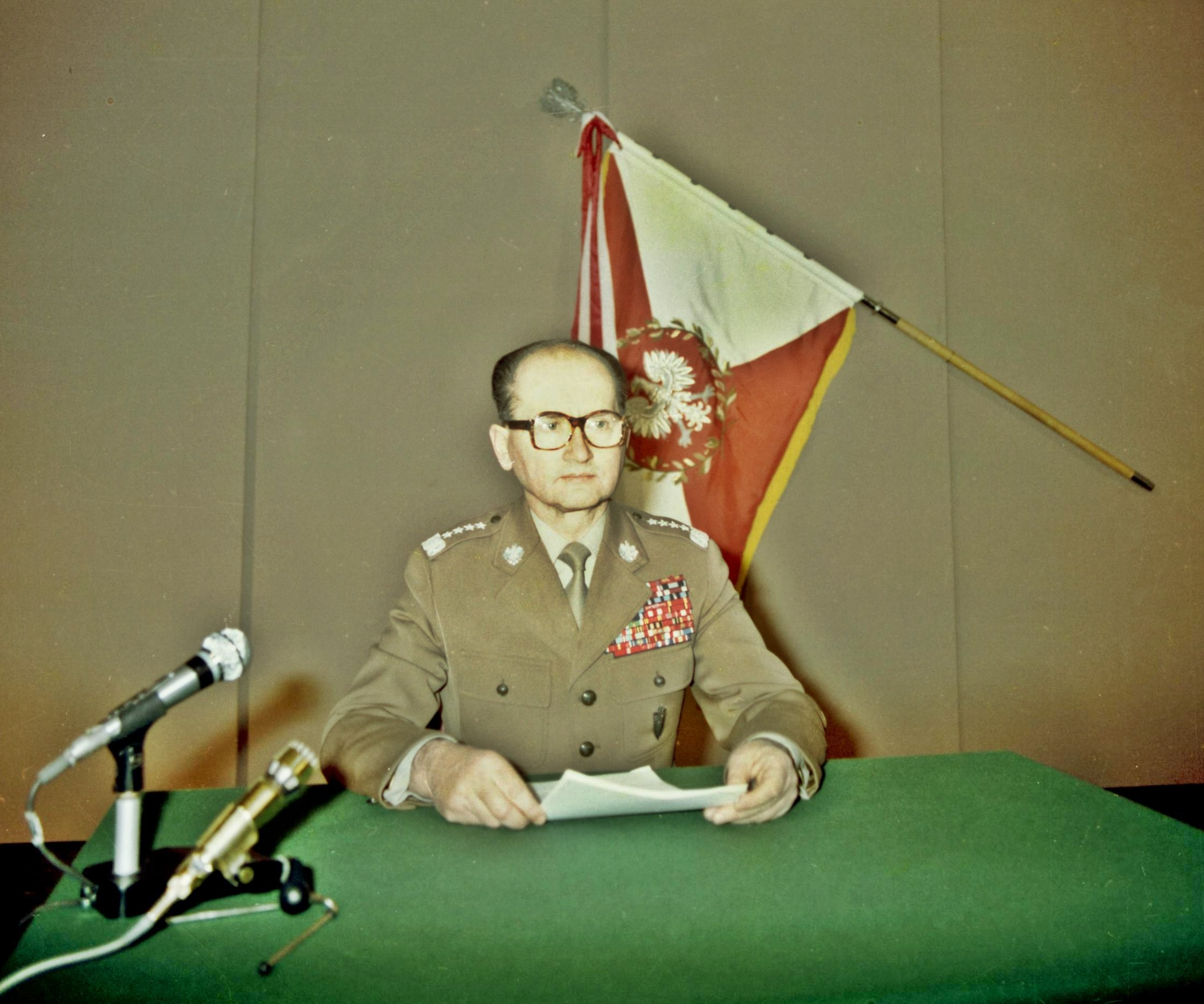
Jaruzelski in a TV studio announcing the introduction of martial law

The proclamation of martial law by the State Council

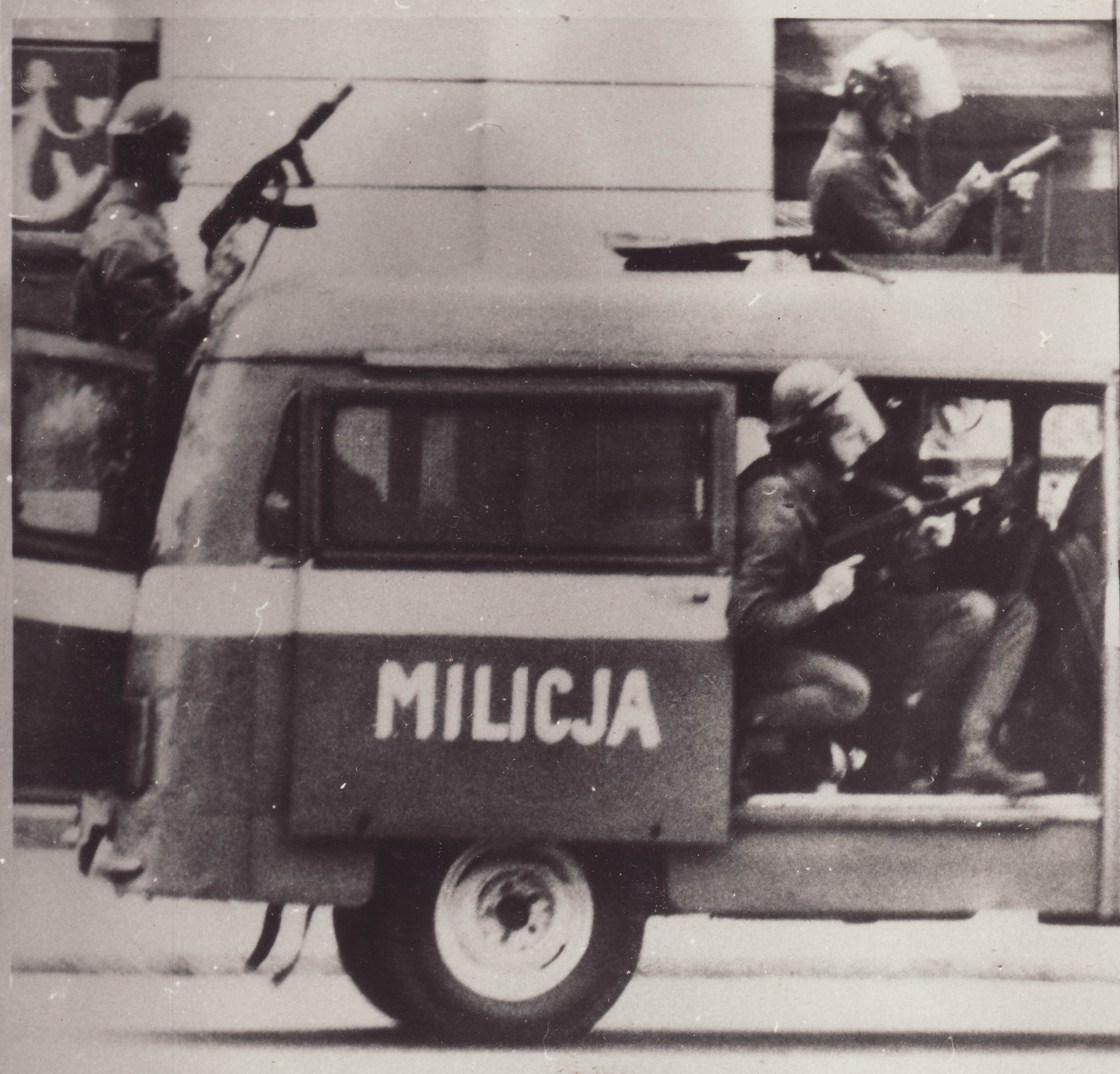
Units of the Citizens' Militia and ZOMO race to disperse crowds of protesters.

== Economic impact ==
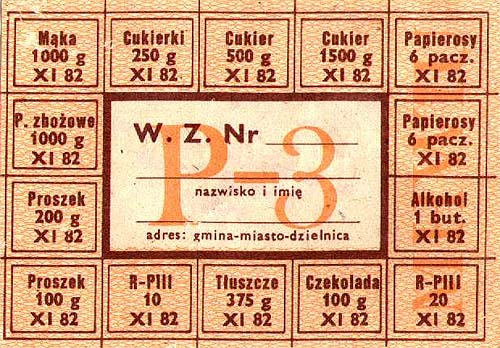
Ration card for food, alcohol, and cigarettes

Even after martial law was lifted, a number of restrictions remained in place for several years that drastically reduced the civil liberties of the citizenry. It also led to severe economic consequences. The ruling military dictatorship instituted major price rises (dubbed "economic reforms"), which resulted in a fall in real wages. The resulting economic crisis led to even more rationing of most basic products and materials.

As a consequence of the economic hardships and political repressions, Poles started leaving the country en masse, with 700,000 Polish citizens migrating to the West between 1981 and 1989. A number of international flights were hijacked in attempts to flee the economically troubled country. Between December 1980 and October 1983, 11 Polish flights were hijacked to Berlin Tempelhof Airport alone.

Around the same time, a group calling themselves the "Polish Revolutionary Home Army" seized the Polish Embassy in Bern, Switzerland on 6 September 1982, taking several diplomats hostage.

== International response ==
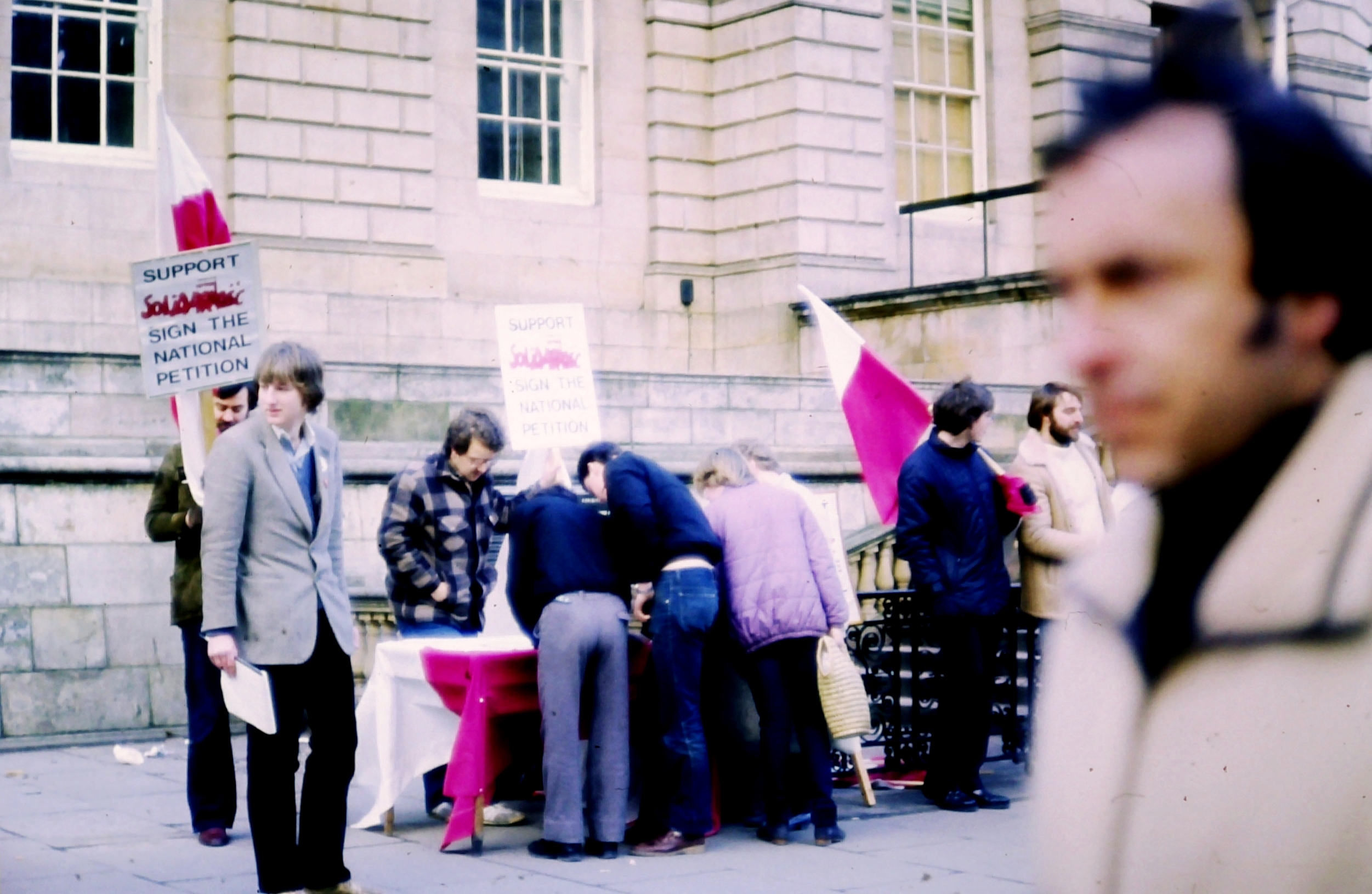
Students in Edinburgh, Scotland collecting signatures for a petition in support of Solidarity in 1981

After the "Wujek" Coal Mine massacre in Katowice on 23 December 1981, the United States imposed economic sanctions against the Polish government. In 1982, the United States suspended Poland's most favored nation trade status until 1987 and vetoed its application for membership in the International Monetary Fund. The Ronald Reagan administration declared 30 January 1982, the first anniversary of the introduction of martial law in Poland, the Day of Solidarity with Poland. The following day, television stations in many countries, as well as the radio stations Voice of America, Radio Liberty and Radio France Internationale broadcast a joint program entitled Let Poland be Poland.

The Central Intelligence Agency (CIA) transferred around $2 million yearly in cash to Solidarity, for a total of $10 million over five years. There were no direct links between the CIA and Solidarity, and all money was channeled through third parties. CIA officers were barred from meeting Solidarity leaders, and the CIA's contacts with Solidarność activists were weaker than those of the AFL–CIO, which raised $300,000 from its members, which were used to provide material and cash directly to Solidarity, with no control of Solidarity's use of it. The U.S. Congress authorized the National Endowment for Democracy to promote democracy, which soon allocated $10 million to Solidarity. CIA support for Solidarity included money, equipment and training, which was coordinated by Special Operations. Henry Hyde, U.S. House intelligence committee member, stated that the US provided "supplies and technical assistance in terms of clandestine newspapers, broadcasting, propaganda, money, organizational help and advice".

Pope John Paul II wrote a letter to the Primate of Poland, Cardinal Stefan Wyszyński, in which he called for peace talks between the state and the workers, supporting the Poles' "undeniable right to resolve their problems by themselves".

== Aftermath ==
=== Ruling of unconstitutionality ===
After the fall of Communism in Poland in 1989, members of a parliamentary commission determined that the implementation of martial law had been in clear violation of the country's constitution, which had authorized the executive to declare martial law exclusively between parliamentary sessions (at other times the decision was to be taken by the Sejm). However, the Sejm had been in session when martial law was instituted. In 1992, the Sejm declared the 1981 imposition of martial law to be unlawful and unconstitutional.

=== Soviet intervention debate ===
The initiators of the martial law, such as Jaruzelski, argued that the army crackdown saved Poland from a possibly disastrous military intervention of the Soviet Union, East Germany, and other Warsaw Pact countries (similar to the earlier interventions in Hungary in 1956 and Czechoslovakia in 1968). Public figures who supported the introduction of martial law (including some right-wing figures such as Jędrzej Giertych) also cited that threat. In a 1995 interview with the Swedish newspaper Dagens Nyheter, Jaruzelski said that on 21 November 1981 he received a formal letter from the Soviet Politburo, demanding "not one step back from socialism", not even on the question of power sharing. According to Jaruzelski, the letter was far more harsh in tone than the letter sent to the Communist Party of Czechoslovakia before the invasion in 1968. "The message was in the form of an ultimatum", Jaruzelski said in the interview, "we had no choice".

In 2009, archive documents hinted that Jaruzelski, in a conversation with Viktor Kulikov, a Soviet military leader, begged for Soviet intervention as his domestic control was deteriorating. Jaruzelski responded by claiming the document was "just another falsification" and denied all accusations.

== See also ==
- Cold War
- Able Archer 83
- Fighting Solidarity
- Pacification of Wujek
- Telephone tapping in the Eastern Bloc
- Soviet reaction to the Polish crisis of 1980–1981
