= Militia curfew =

Former Polish curfew law

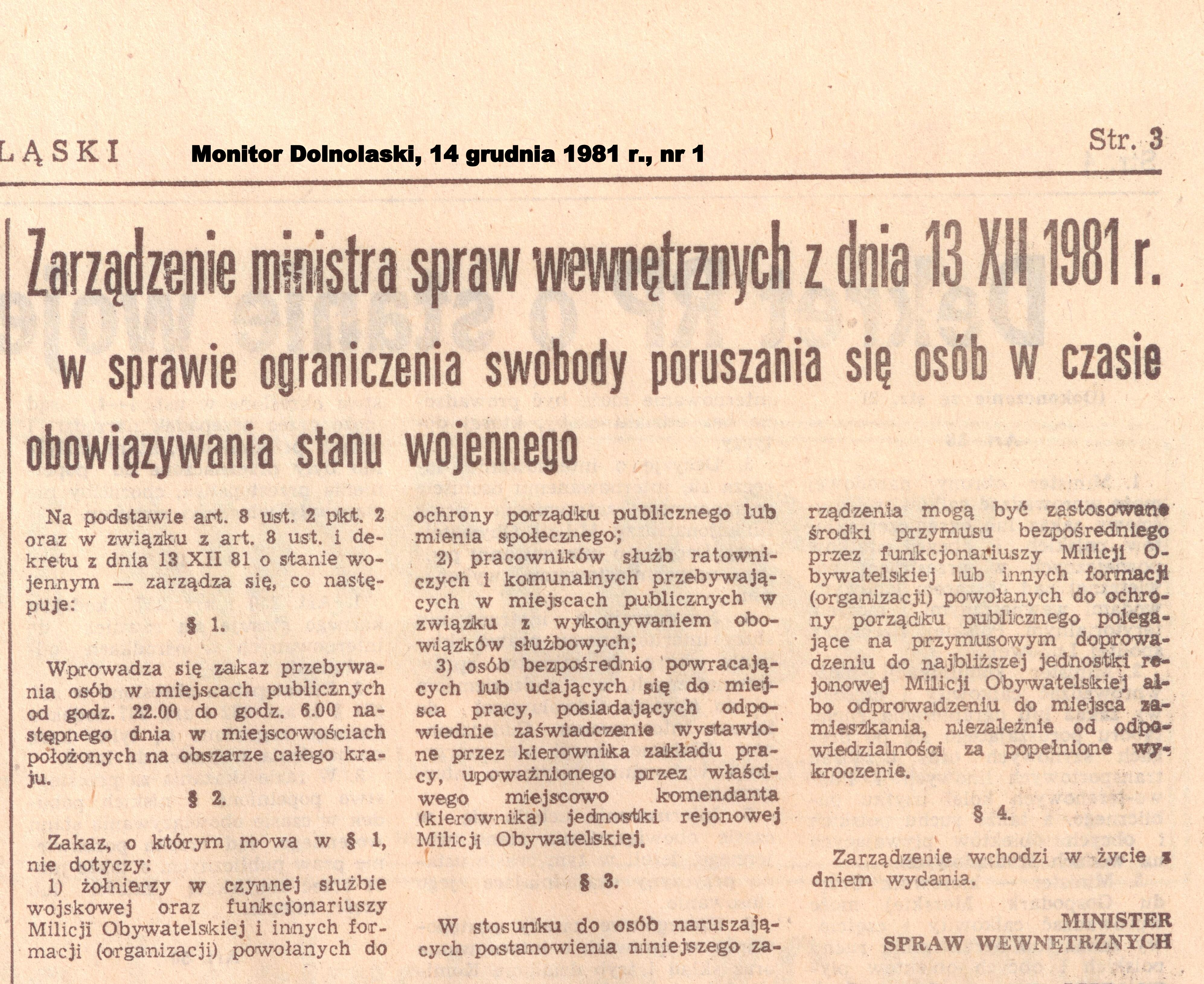
News come of the law, 14 December 1981

The militia curfew (Polish: Godzina milicyjna) was a curfew law passed during martial law in Poland on 13 December 1981 during which the Citizen's Militia would arrest citizens for roaming the streets from 10 PM to 6 AM.
