= Edward Gierek =

Polish politician; leader of Poland (1970–1980)

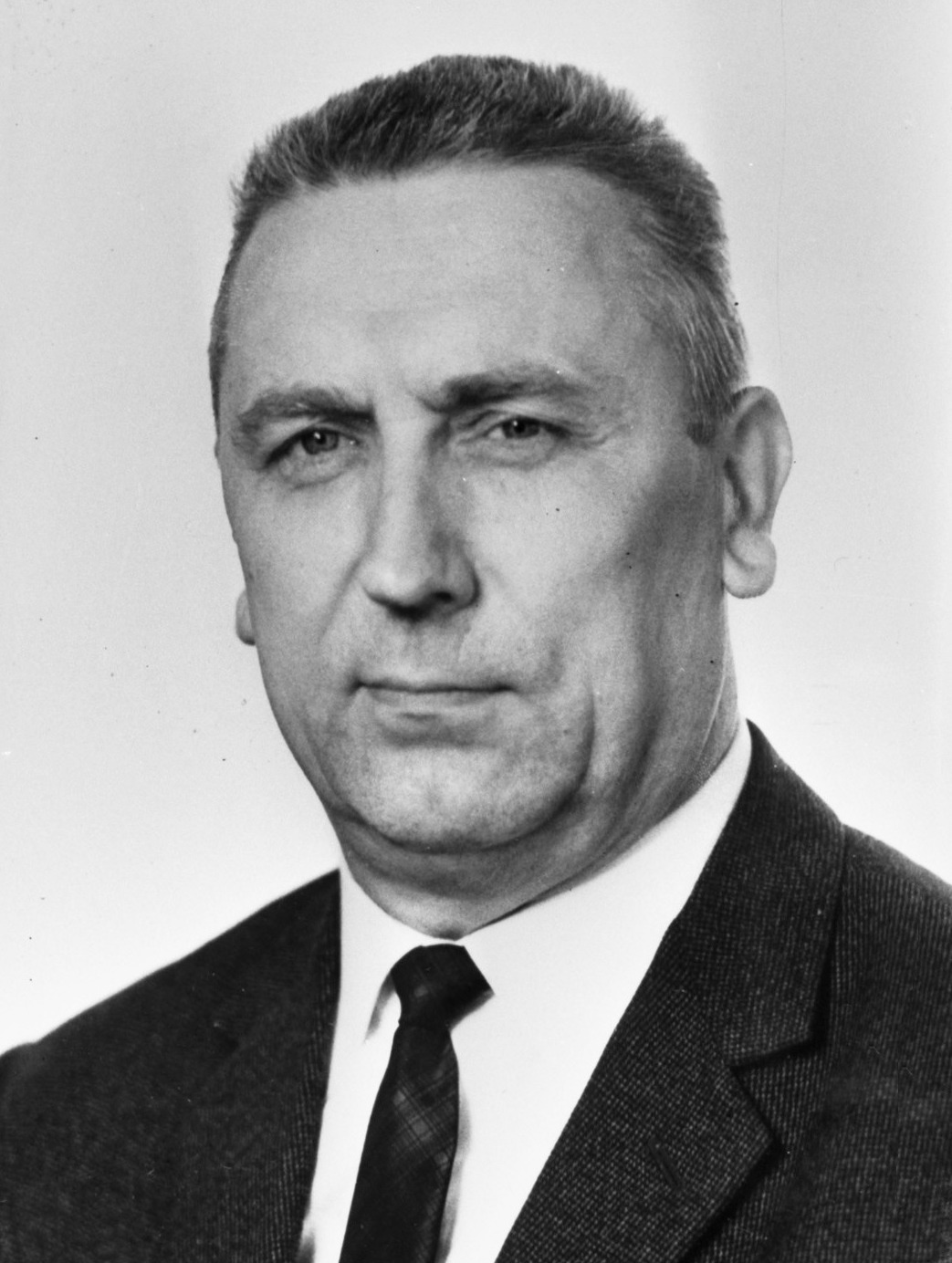
- Gierek in 1980

First Secretary of the Polish United Workers' Party
- In office 20 December 1970 – 6 September 1980
- Preceded by: Władysław Gomułka
- Succeeded by: Stanisław Kania

Personal details
- Born: 6 January 1913 Porąbka, Congress Poland, Russian Empire
- Died: 29 July 2001 (aged 88) Cieszyn, Poland
- Party: Polish United Workers' Party (1948–1981)
- Spouse: Stanisława Jędrusik (1918–2007)
- De facto leader of the PPR: ← Gomułka; Kania →

Edward Gierek (Polish pronunciation: [ˈɛdvart ˈɡʲɛrɛk]; 6 January 1913 – 29 July 2001) was a Polish communist politician who served as the de facto leader of the Polish People's Republic between 1970 and 1980. Gierek replaced Władysław Gomułka as the First Secretary of the ruling Polish United Workers' Party (PZPR).

Gierek came from a coal mining family and grew up in France from a young age. He began working as a miner at the age of 13, and later became active in the French communist movement and the Polish community in France. Gierek was deported to the Second Polish Republic for his communist advocacy in 1934 but moved to Belgium and was active in the Belgian Resistance during World War II. Gierek returned to Poland in 1948 and attended in the founding of the PZPR as a representative of Silesia, being appointed to the Sejm in 1952, the Central Committee of the PZPR under Bolesław Bierut in 1956, and the Politburo of the PZPR in 1959. Gierek was known for his openness and public speaking, emerging as one of the most respected and progressive politicians in Poland, whilst becoming an opponent to Gomułka.

Gierek became First Secretary when Gomułka was removed from office after the 1970 Polish protests were violently suppressed under his authority. Gierek's first years were marked by improvements in living and working conditions with the construction of blocks of flats, growing industrialisation, as well as the loosening of state censorship and openness to new Western ideas which turned Poland into the most liberal country of the Eastern Bloc. Gierek opened the first fully-operational highway in Poland from Warsaw to Katowice in 1976. Gierek's policies were funded by large foreign loans and Poland continued to submerge into relative economic stagnation by the end of the 1970s. Gierek's government was unable to pay its creditors and the country was so heavily indebted that rationing was introduced due to shortages. Gierek was removed from power after the Gdańsk Agreement between the state and workers of the emerging Solidarity movement, which was seen as a move to renounce communism by the PZPR's leadership, who replaced him as First Secretary with Stanisław Kania. Gierek was expelled from the PZPR and arrested briefly in 1981 during martial law in Poland, living the remainder of his life in retirement until his death in 2001.

Gierek is fondly remembered for his patriotism and modernisation policies despite dragging Poland into financial and economic decline; over 2 million flats were constructed during his tenure to house the growing population at a record rate of over 200,000 flats a year, which was only again reached almost 40 years later (by 2019) and he was also responsible for initiating the production of the Fiat 126 car in Poland, the reconstruction of the Royal Castle in Warsaw, and the construction of Warsaw Central, the most modern railway station in Europe at the time of its completion.

== Youth and early career ==
Edward Gierek was born in Porąbka, now part of Sosnowiec, into a coal-mining family. His father was killed in an accident at a pit when he was four. His mother remarried and emigrated to northern France, where he lived from the age of 10 and worked in a coal mine from the age of 13. Gierek joined the French Communist Party in 1931, and in 1934 was deported to Poland for organising a strike. After completing compulsory military service in Stryi in southeastern Poland (1934–1936), Gierek married Stanisława Jędrusik, but was unable to find employment. The Giereks went to Belgium, where Edward worked in the coal mines of Waterschei, where he contracted pneumoconiosis (black lung disease). In 1939, Gierek joined the Communist Party of Belgium. During the German occupation, he participated in communist anti-Nazi Belgian resistance activities. After the war Gierek remained politically active among the Polish immigrant community. He was a co-founder of the Belgian branch of the Polish Workers' Party (PPR) and a chairman of the National Council of Poles in Belgium.

== Polish United Workers' Party activist ==
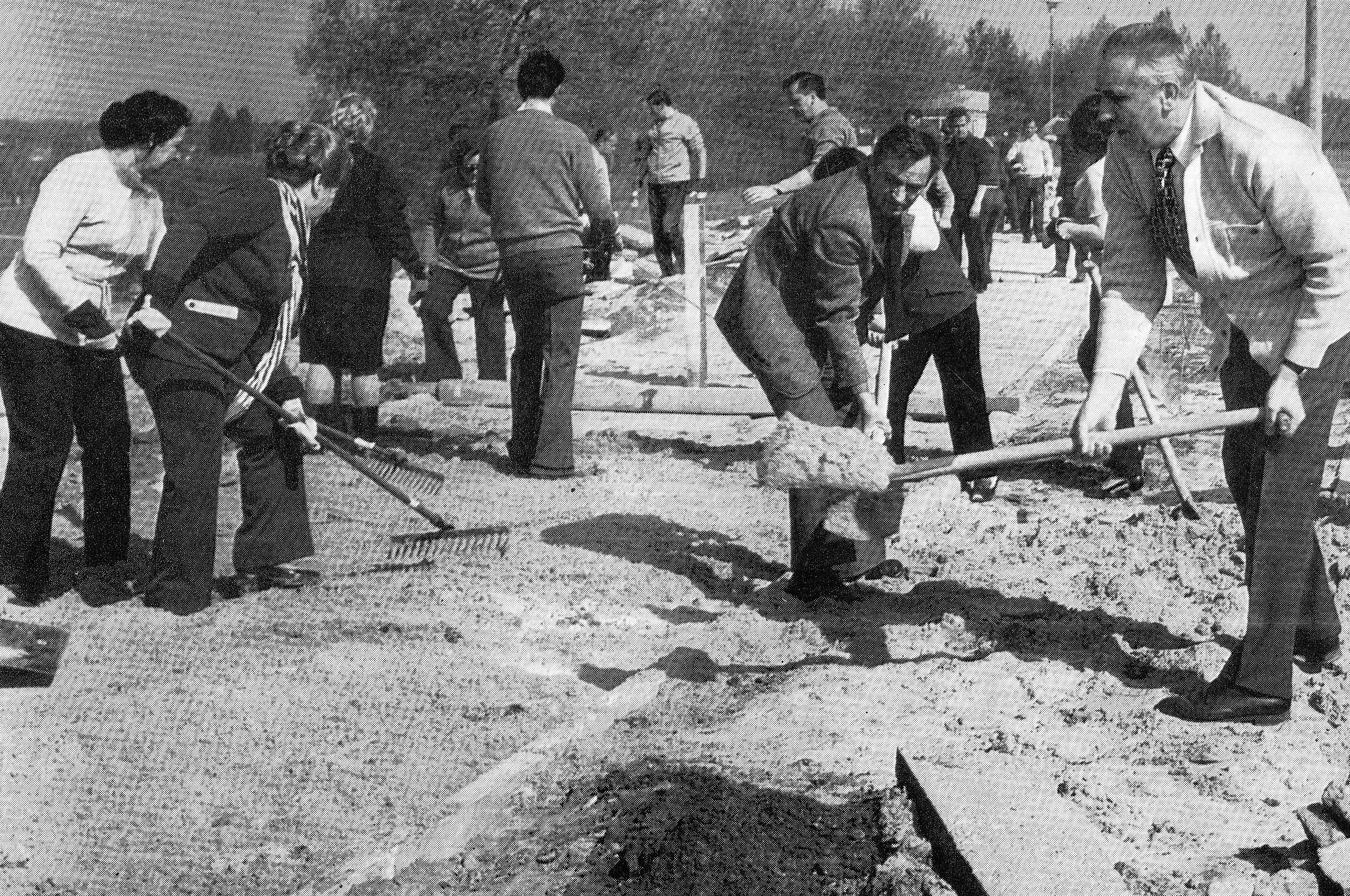
Gierek and his wife contribute to Party Volunteer Labor Day

Gierek, who in 1948 was 35 and had spent 22 years abroad, was directed by the PPR authorities to return to Poland, which he did with his wife and their two sons. Working in the Katowice district PPR organisation, in December 1948, as a Sosnowiec delegate he participated in the PPR-PPS unification congress, which resulted in the establishment of the Polish United Workers' Party (PZPR). In 1949, he was designated for and attended a two-year higher party course in Warsaw, where he was judged to be poorly qualified for intellectual endeavors but highly motivated for party work. In 1951, Roman Zambrowski sent Gierek to a striking coal mine, charging him with restoring order. Gierek was able to resolve the situation using persuasion; the use of force was avoided. He was a member of the Sejm, Polish parliament, from 1952. During the II Congress of the PZPR (March 1954), he was elected a member of the party's Central Committee. As chief of the Central Committee's Heavy Industry Division, he worked directly under First Secretary Bolesław Bierut in Warsaw.

In March 1956, when Edward Ochab became the party's first secretary, Gierek became a secretary of the Central Committee, even though he publicly expressed doubts about his own qualifications. On 28 June 1956, he was sent to Poznań, where a workers' protest was taking place. Afterward, delegated by the Politburo, he headed the commission charged with investigating the causes and course of the Poznań events. They presented their report on 7 July, blaming a hostile, anti-socialist foreign-inspired conspiracy that took advantage of worker discontent in Poznań enterprises. In July, Gierek became a member of the PZPR Politburo, but lasted in that position only until October, when Władysław Gomułka replaced Ochab as first secretary. Nikita Khrushchev criticised Gomułka for not retaining Gierek in the Politburo; he remained a Central Committee secretary responsible for economic affairs, however. He returned to the Politburo in March 1959, at the III Congress of the PZPR.

== Katowice industrial district leader ==
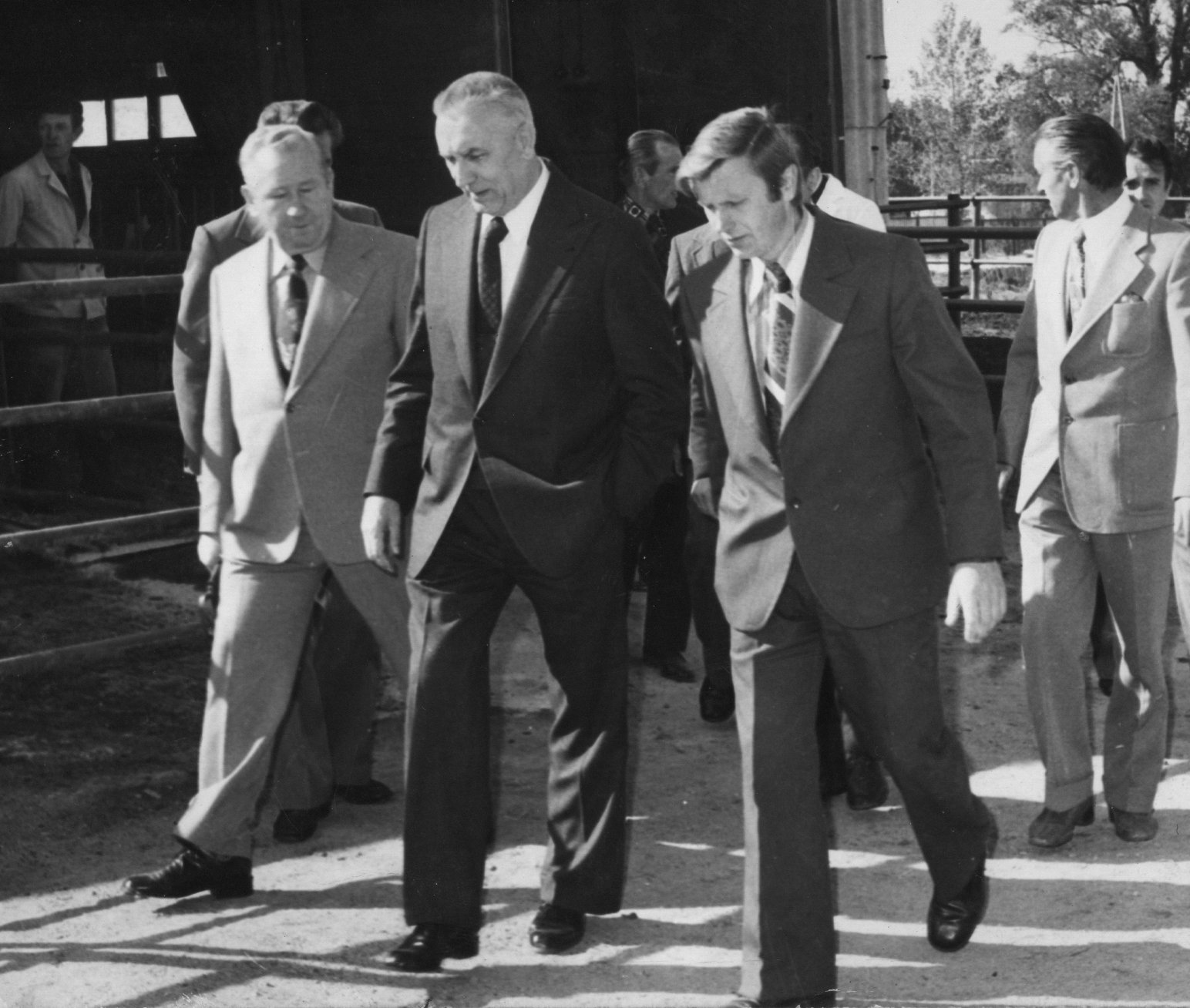
First Secretary Edward Gierek (second from left)

In March 1957, in addition to his Central Committee duties, Gierek became the first secretary of the Katowice Voivodeship PZPR organisation, a job he kept until 1970. He created a personal power base in the Katowice region and became the nationally recognised leader of the young technocrat faction of the party. On the one hand, Gierek was regarded as a pragmatic, non-ideological and economic progress-oriented manager; on the other, he was known for his servile attitude toward the Soviet leaders, for whom he was a source of information concerning the PZPR and its personalities. Both the industrial supremacy of Gierek's well-run Upper Silesia territory and the special relationship with the Soviets he cultivated made many believe that Gierek was a likely successor to Gomułka.

The Warsaw University law professor Mieczysław Maneli, who had known Gierek since 1960, wrote about him in 1971: "Edward Gierek is an old‐fashioned Communist, but without fanaticism or zealousness. His Marxism is encumbered by a few dogmas. It is almost pragmatic. He believes profoundly in the leading role that history conferred upon Communist parties and lives by the maxim that a government should be strong and rule unshakably [...] Gierek's party nickname was "Tshombe", and Silesia was the "Polish Katanga". There, he operated almost as a sovereign prince, a talented organiser with a real gift for finding efficient and loyal henchmen. All professions were represented in his court: engineers, economists, professors, writers, party apparatchiks and security agents".

Gierek may have tried to make his move during the 1968 Polish political crisis. Soon after the student rally on 8 March in Warsaw, on 14 March in Katowice, he led a mass gathering of 100,000 party members from the entire province. He was the first Politburo member to speak publicly on the issue of the protests then taking place and later claimed that his motivation was to demonstrate support for Gomułka's rule, threatened by Mieczysław Moczar's intra-party conspiring. Gierek used strong language to condemn the purported "enemies of People's Poland" who were "disturbing the peaceful Silesian water". He showered them with propaganda epithets and alluded to their bones being crushed if they persevered in their attempts to turn the "nation" away from its "chosen course". Gierek was supposedly embarrassed when participants at the party conference in Warsaw on 19 March shouted his name along with that of Gomułka, as an expression of support. The 1968 events strengthened Gierek's position, also in the eyes of his sponsors in Moscow.

== First secretary of the PZPR ==
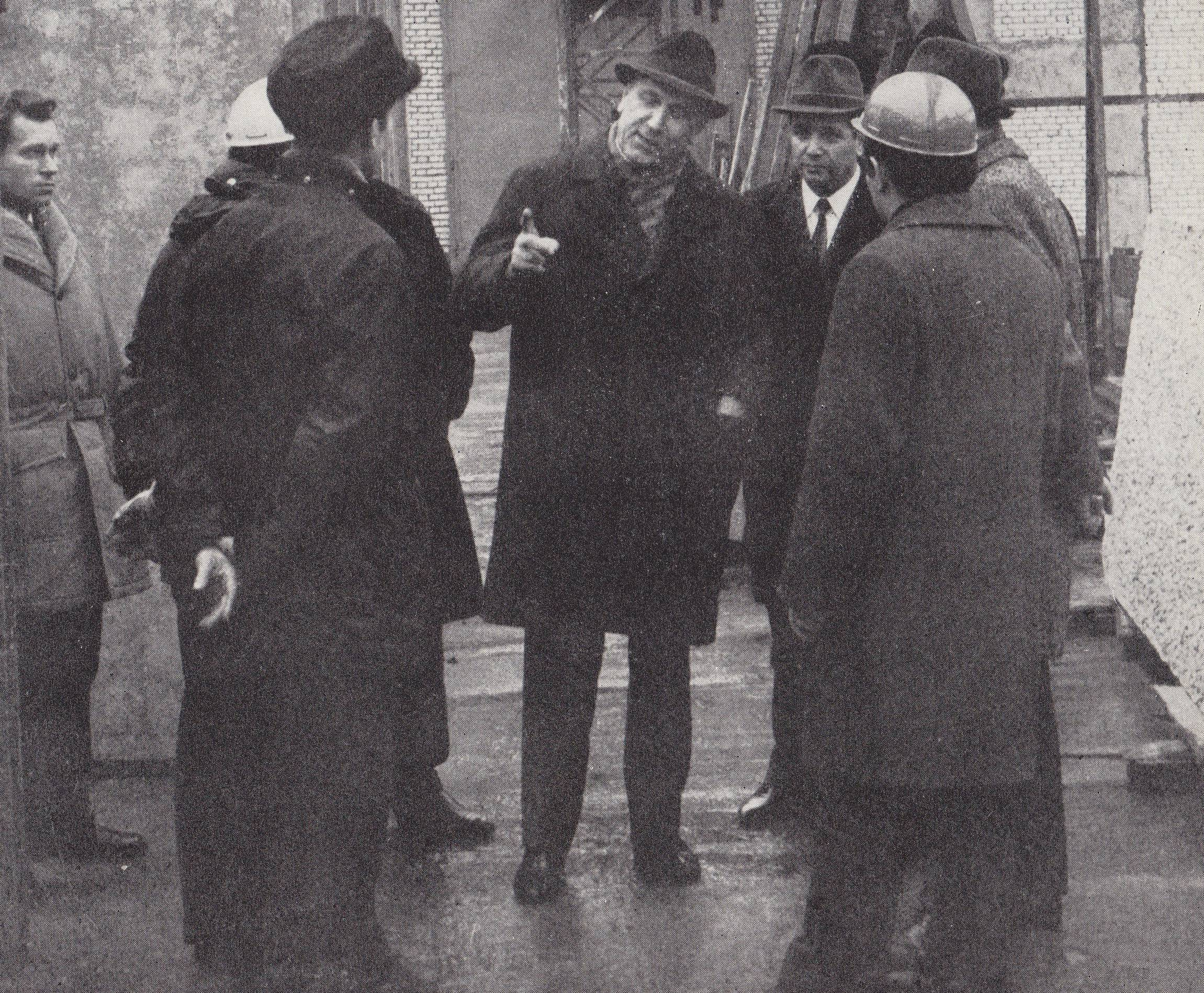
Gierek participated in hundreds of field trips and visitations, meeting ordinary people and seeking their feedback

When the 1970 Polish protests were violently suppressed, Gierek replaced Gomułka as the first secretary of the party, becoming the most powerful politician in Poland. In late January 1971, he put his new authority on the line and traveled to Szczecin and Gdańsk, to bargain personally with the striking workers. Consumer price increases that had triggered the recent revolt were rescinded. Among Gierek's popular moves was the decision to rebuild the Royal Castle in Warsaw, destroyed during World War II and not included in the post-war restoration of the city's Warsaw Old Town. State-controlled media stressed his foreign upbringing and his fluency in French.

The arrival of the Gierek team meant the final generational replacement of the ruling communist elite, a process begun in 1968 under Gomułka. Many thousands of party activists, including important elder leaders with a background in the prewar Communist Party of Poland, were removed from positions of responsibility and replaced with people whose careers started after World War II. Much of the overhaul was accomplished during and after the VI Congress of the PZPR, convened in December 1971. The resulting governing class was one of the youngest in Europe. The role of the administration was expanded at the expense of the party, according to the maxim "the party leads, the government governs". Throughout the 1970s, the most highly visible member of the top leadership after Gierek was Prime Minister Piotr Jaroszewicz. From May 1971, Gierek's rival party politician Mieczysław Moczar was increasingly marginalised.

According to historian Krzysztof Pomian, early in his term, Gierek abandoned the regime's long-standing practice of on-and-off confrontation with the Polish Catholic Church, and opted for cooperation, giving the Church and its leaders a privileged position for the duration of communist rule in Poland. The Church markedly expanded its physical infrastructure and also became a crucial political third force, often involved in mediating conflict between the authorities and opposition activists.

=== Economic expansion and decline ===
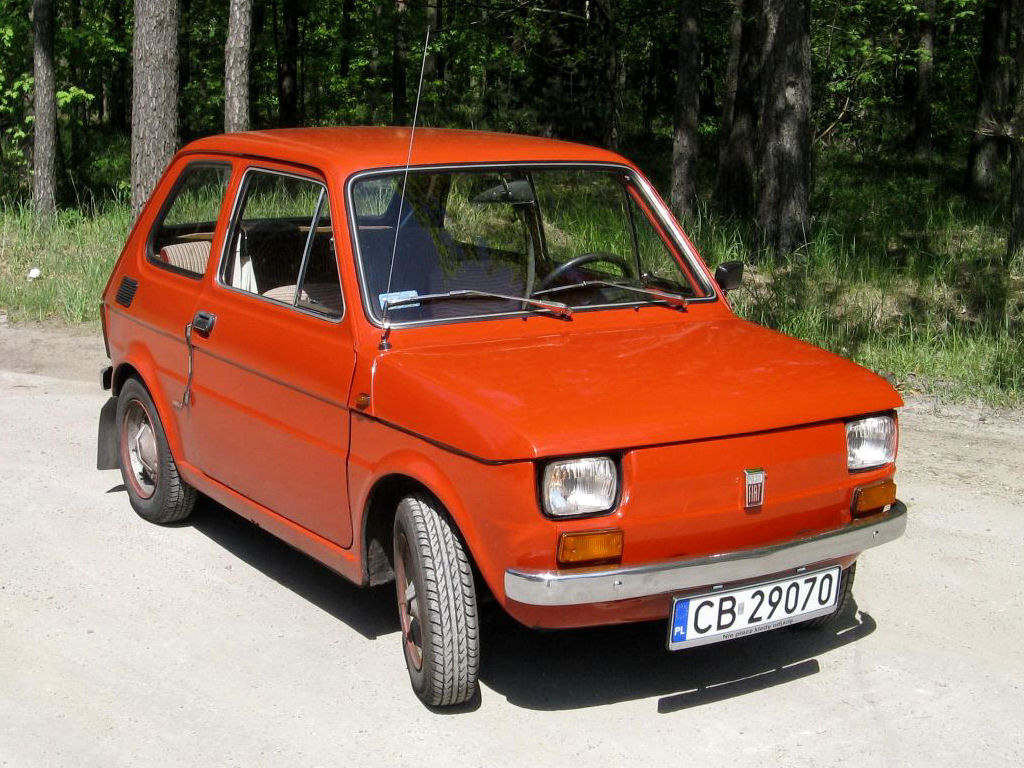
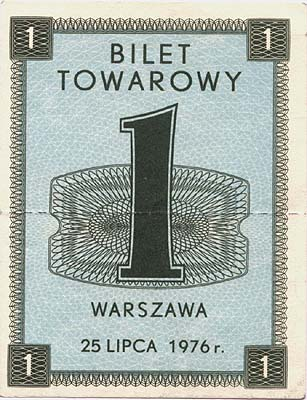
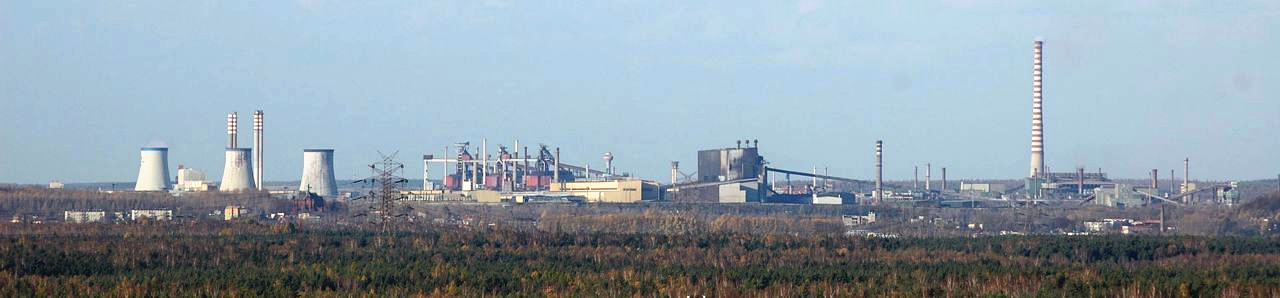
Top-left: 1973 Polish Fiat 126p, nicknamed maluch (tiny)
Top-right: 1976 food ration card for sugar
Bottom: Katowice Steelworks, Gierek's major industrial project

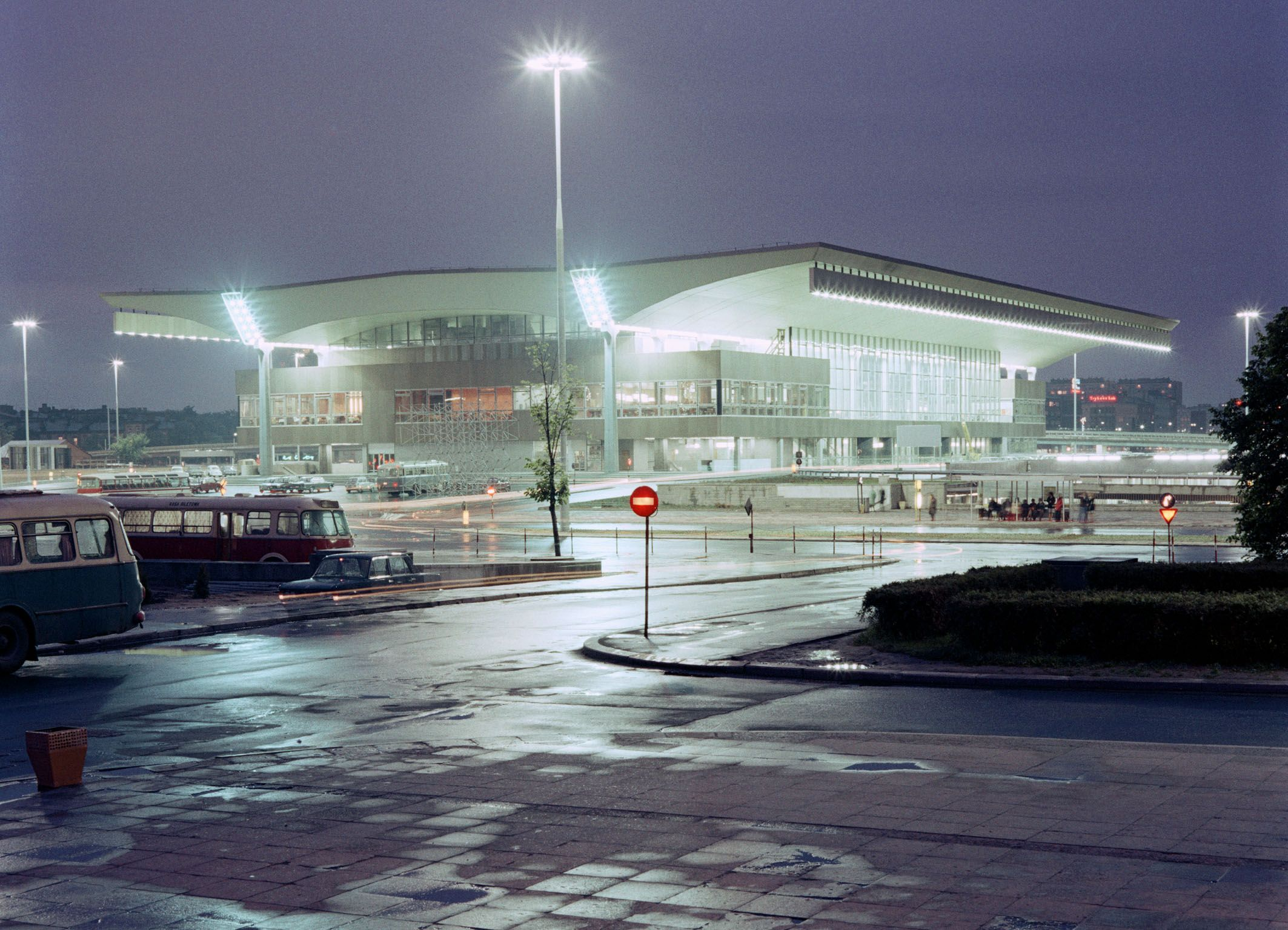
Edward Gierek personally made the official opening of the new Warszawa Centralna railway station on 5 December 1975.

As the riots that had brought down Gomułka were caused primarily by economic difficulties, Gierek promised economic reform and instituted a program to modernize industry and increase the availability of consumer goods. His "reform" was based primarily on large-scale foreign borrowing, not accompanied by major systemic restructuring. The need for deeper reform was obscured by the investment boom the country was enjoying in the first half of the 1970s. The first secretary's good relations with Western leaders, especially France's Valéry Giscard d'Estaing and West Germany's Helmut Schmidt, were a catalyst for his receiving foreign aid and loans. Gierek is widely credited with opening Poland to political and economic influence from the West. He himself extensively traveled abroad and received important foreign guests in Poland, including three presidents of the United States. Gierek also was trusted by Leonid Brezhnev, which meant that he was able to pursue his policies (globalisation of Poland's economy) without much Soviet interference. He had readily granted the Soviets concessions that his predecessor Gomułka would have considered contrary to the Polish national interest.

The standard of living increased markedly in Poland in the first half of the 1970s, and for a time Gierek was hailed as a miracle worker. Poles, to an unprecedented degree, were able to purchase desired consumer items such as compact cars, travel to the West rather freely, and even a solution to the intractable housing supply problem seemed to be on the horizon. Decades later, many remembered the period as the most prosperous in their lives. The economy, however, began to falter during the 1973 oil crisis, and by 1976 price increases became necessary. The June 1976 protests were forcibly suppressed, but the planned price increases were canceled. The greatest accumulation of foreign debt occurred in the late 1970s, as the regime struggled to counter the effects of the crisis.

=== Crisis, protests, organised opposition ===
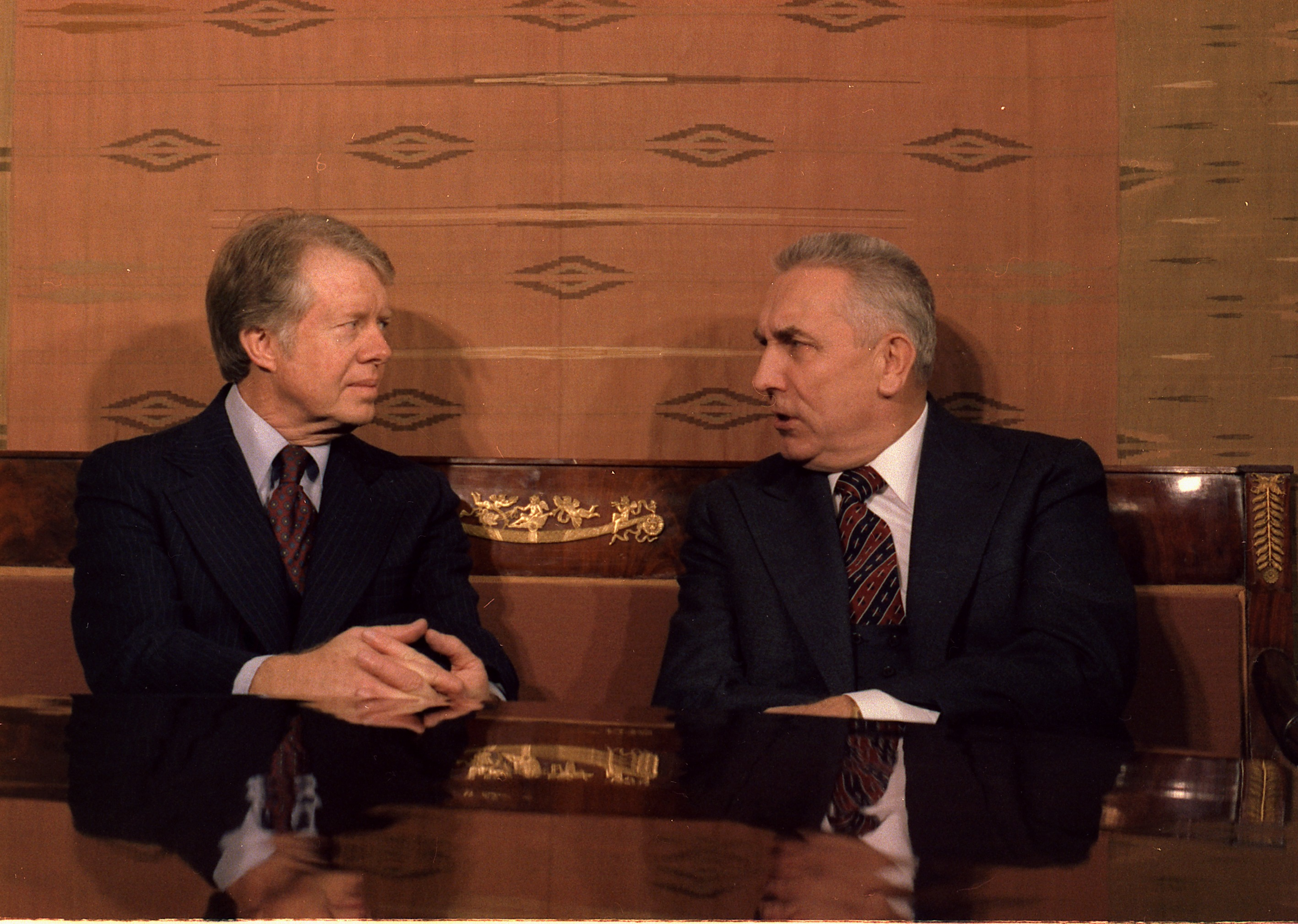
Gierek with President of the United States Jimmy Carter in December 1977

The period of Gierek's rule is notable for the rise of organized opposition in Poland. Changes to the constitution proposed by the regime caused considerable controversy at the turn of 1975 and 1976. The intended amendments included formalising the "socialist character of the state", the leading role of the PZPR and the Polish-Soviet alliance. The widely opposed alterations led to numerous protest letters and other actions, but were supported at the VII Congress of the PZPR in December 1975 and largely implemented by the Sejm in February 1976. Organised opposition circles developed gradually and reached 3,000–4,000 members by the end of the decade.

Because of the deteriorating economic situation, at the end of 1975, the authorities announced that the 1971 freeze on food prices would have to be lifted. Prime Minister Jaroszewicz forced the price rises, in combination with financial compensation favoring upper income brackets; the policy was ultimately adopted despite strong objections from the Soviet leadership. The increase, supported by Gierek, was announced by Jaroszewicz in the Sejm on 24 June 1976. Strikes broke out the following day, with particularly serious disturbances, brutally suppressed by the police, taking place in Radom, at Warsaw's Ursus Factory and in Płock. On 26 June, Gierek engaged in the traditional party crisis-confronting mode of operation, ordering mass public gatherings in Polish cities to demonstrate people's supposed support for the party and condemn the "trouble makers".

Ordered by Brezhnev not to attempt any further manipulations with prices, Gierek and his government undertook other measures to rescue the market destabilised in the summer of 1976. In August, "merchandise coupons" were introduced to ration sugar. The politics of "dynamic development" was over, as evidenced by such ration cards, which were retained until July 1989.

In the aftermath of the June 1976 protests, a major opposition group, the Workers' Defence Committee (KOR), commenced its activities in September to help the persecuted worker protest participants. Other opposition organisations were also established in 1977–1979, but historically, the KOR proved to be of particular importance.

In 1979, Poland's ruling communists reluctantly allowed Pope John Paul II (born Karol Wojtyła, a Pole) to make his first papal visit to Poland (2–10 June), despite Soviet advice to the contrary. Gierek, who had previously met Pope Paul VI at the Vatican, talked with the Pope during his visit.

== Downfall ==
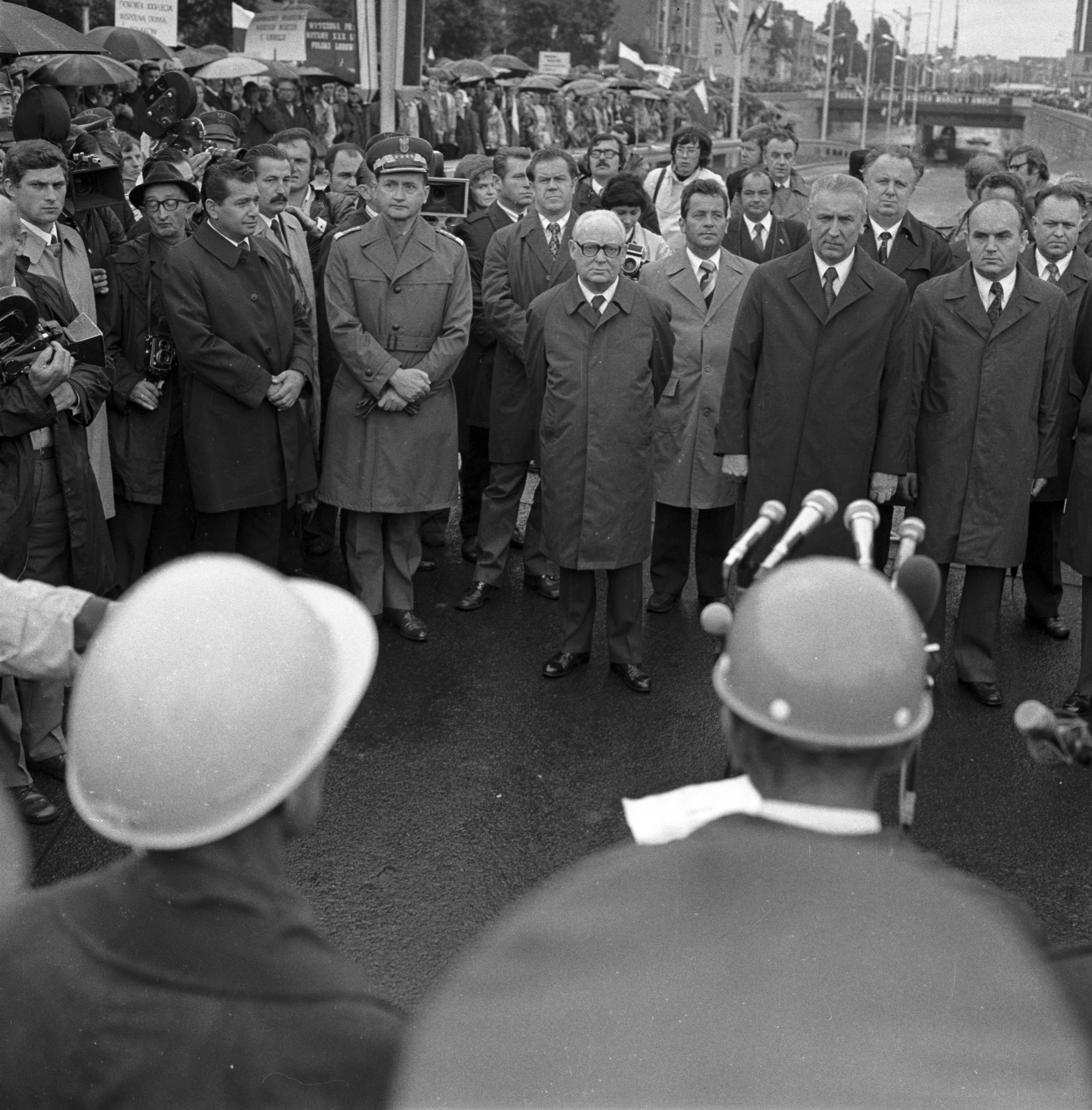
Gierek (front, 2nd from right), Wojciech Jaruzelski (front, 4th from right), Stanisław Kania (back, 1st from right), among other high ranking politicians in 1974

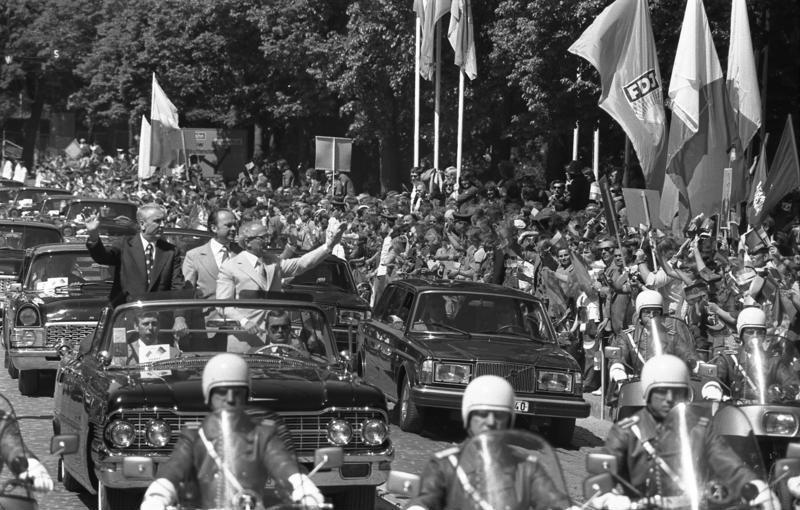
Gierek with East German leader Erich Honecker

Although Gierek, distressed by the 1976 price increase policy failure, was persuaded by his colleagues not to resign, divisions within his team intensified. One faction, led by Edward Babiuch and Piotr Jaroszewicz, wanted him to remain in power, while another, led by Stanisław Kania and Wojciech Jaruzelski, was less interested in preserving his leadership.

In May 1980, after the Soviet invasion of Afghanistan and the subsequent Western boycott of the Soviet Union, Gierek arranged a meeting between Valéry Giscard d'Estaing and Leonid Brezhnev in Warsaw. As was the case with Władysław Gomułka a decade earlier, a foreign policy success created an illusion that the Polish party leader was secure in his statesman aura, while the paramount political facts were being determined by the deteriorating economic situation and the resultant labor unrest. In July, Gierek went to Crimea, his usual vacation spot. For the last time, he talked there with his friend Brezhnev. He responded to Brezhnev's gloomy assessment of the situation in Poland (including the out-of-control indebtedness) with his own upbeat predictions, possibly not fully cognisant of the country's and his own predicament.

High foreign debts, food shortages, and an outmoded industrial base were among the factors that forced a new round of economic reforms. Once again, in the summer of 1980, price increases set off protests across the country, especially in the Gdańsk and Szczecin Shipyards. Unlike on previous occasions, the regime decided not to resort to force to suppress the strikes. In the Gdańsk Agreement and other accords reached with Polish workers, Gierek was forced to concede their right to strike, and the Solidarity labor union was born.

Shortly thereafter, in early September 1980, he was replaced by the Central Committee's VI Plenum as party first secretary by Stanisław Kania, and removed from power. A popular and trusted leader in the early 1970s, Gierek left surrounded by infamy and ridicule, deserted by most of his collaborators. The VII Plenum in December 1980 held Gierek and Jaroszewicz personally liable for the situation in the country and removed them from the Central Committee. The extraordinary IX Congress of the PZPR, in an unprecedented move, voted in July 1981 to expel Gierek and his close associates from the party, as the delegates considered them responsible for the Solidarity-related crisis in Poland, and the First Secretary Kania was unable to prevent their action. The next first secretary of the PZPR, General Wojciech Jaruzelski, introduced martial law on 13 December 1981. Gierek was interned for a year from December 1981. Unlike the (also-interned) opposition activists, the internment status brought Gierek no social respect; he ended his political career as the era's main pariah.

== Death ==
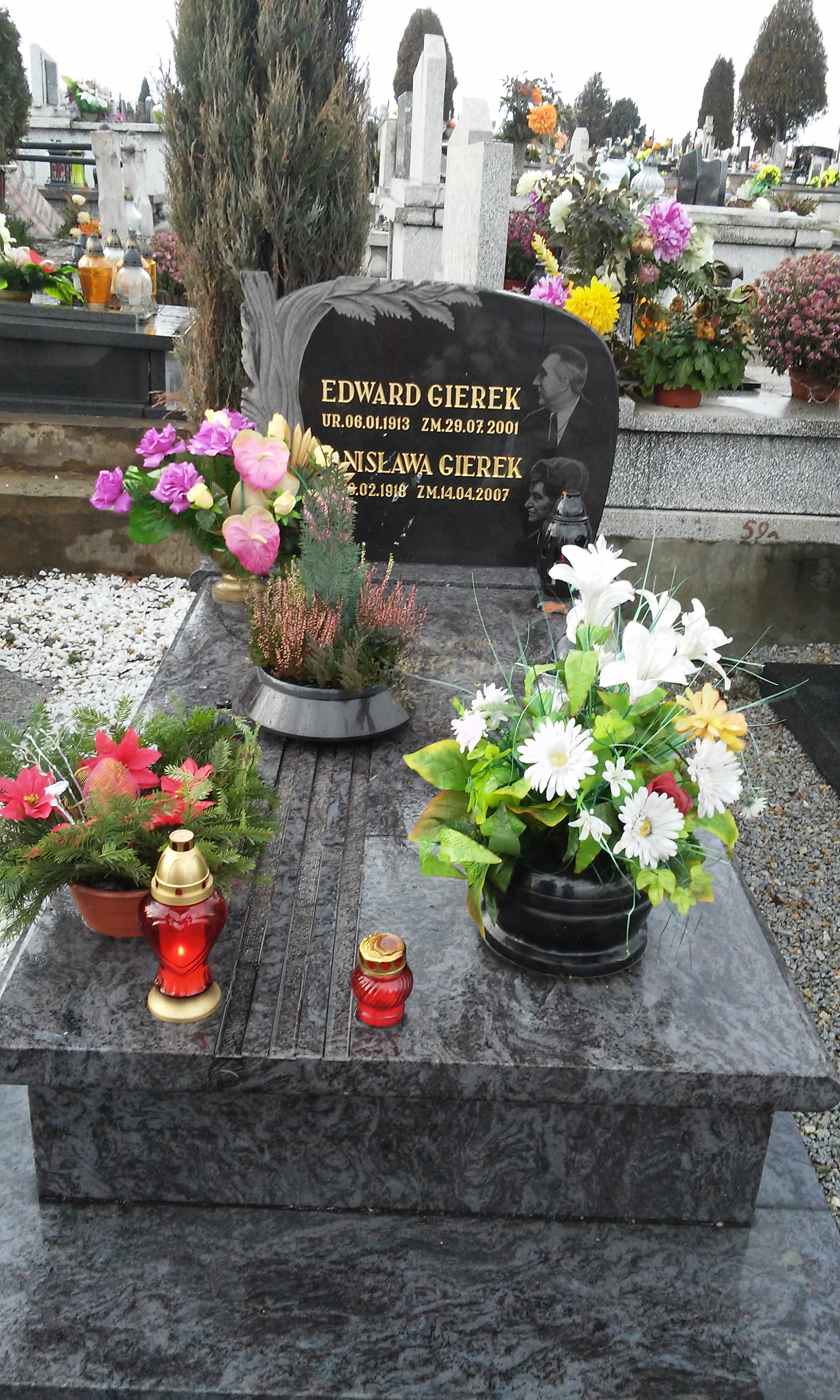
Grave of Edward and Stanisława Gierek in Sosnowiec

Edward Gierek died in July 2001 of pneumoconiosis in a hospital in Cieszyn, near the southern mountain resort of Ustroń, where he spent his last years. By then, his rule was seen more favourably, and over 10,000 people attended his funeral.

== Personal life ==
With his lifelong wife, Stanisława née Jędrusik, Gierek had two sons, one of whom is MEP Adam Gierek.

== Legacy ==
In 1990, two books, based on extended interviews with Gierek by Janusz Rolicki, were published in Poland; the books became bestsellers.

Polish society is divided in its assessment of Gierek. His government is fondly remembered by some for the improved living standards the Poles enjoyed in the 1970s under his rule. He was the only PZPR leader for whom the Polish public showed signs of nostalgia, discernible especially after his death. When polled, 45% of Poles assessed Gierek's legacy as largely positive, while only 22% judged him negatively.

Others emphasise that the improvements were only made possible by the unwise and unsustainable policies based on huge foreign loans, which led directly to the economic crises of the 1970s and 1980s. Judged in hindsight, the more than 24 billion US dollars borrowed were not well spent.

Upon becoming the first secretary in December 1970, Gierek promised himself that under his watch, people would not be shot on the streets. In 1976, the security forces did intervene in strikes, but only after giving up their firearms. In 1980, they did not use force at all.

According to sociologist and socialist politician Maciej Gdula, the social and cultural transformation that took place in Poland in the 1970s was even more fundamental than in the 1990s, following the political transition. Regarding the politics of alliance of the political and later also money elites with the middle class at the expense of the working class, he said "the general idea of the relationship of forces in our society has remained the same from the 1970s, and the period of mass solidarity was an exception" ("mass solidarity" being the years 1980–1981). Since the time of Gierek, Polish society has been hegemonised by cultural perceptions and norms of the (at that time emerging) middle class. Terms like management, initiative, personality, or the individualistic maxim "get educated, work hard and get ahead in life", combined with orderliness, replaced class consciousness and the socialist egalitarian concept, as workers were losing their symbolic status, to be eventually separated into a marginalised stratum.

At the beginning of 2022, a biographical movie about Gierek was released in Poland, directed by Michał Węgrzyn, titled "Gierek".

== Decorations and awards ==
Poland

Order of the Builders of People's Poland
Order of the Banner of Labour (1st Class)
Cross of Merit (Gold Cross)
Partisan Cross
Medal for Long Marital Life

Foreign Awards

Grand Cordon of the Order of Leopold (Belgium)
Order of José Martí (Cuba)
Grand Cross of the Legion of Honour (France)
Grand Collar of the Order of Prince Henry (Portugal)
Great star of the Order of the Yugoslav Star (Yugoslavia)
Order of Lenin (USSR)
Jubilee Medal "In Commemoration of the 100th Anniversary of the Birth of Vladimir Ilyich Lenin" (USSR)
Order of the October Revolution (USSR)

== See also ==
- History of Poland (1945–1989)

Party political offices
Preceded by Władysław Gomułka	General Secretary of the Polish United Workers' Party; 20 December 1970 – 6 September 1980	Succeeded by Stanisław Kania
