= Day of Solidarity with Poland =

1982 day supporting democratic opposition in communist Poland

Day of Solidarity with Poland was a special day declared by the administration of American President Ronald Reagan in support of the democratic opposition in Poland.

The day was set for January 30, 1982, as a response to the introduction of martial law in Poland on December 13, 1981. On that day, demonstrations were held all over the world in defense of the outlawed Solidarity movement. The next day, January 31, 1982, television stations in many countries, as well as the radio stations Voice of America, Radio Liberty and Radio France Internationale broadcast a joint program entitled Let Poland be Poland.
