= Wrocanka, Jasło County =

Wrocanka
- Village
- Location within Poland
- Coordinates: 49°43′N 21°35′E
- Country: Poland
- Voivodeship: Subcarpathian
- County: Krosno
- Gmina: Miejsce Piastowe
- Population: 760

Wrocanka [vrɔˈt͡saŋka] is a village in the administrative district of Gmina Tarnowiec, within Jasło County, Subcarpathian Voivodeship, in south-eastern Poland.
