= Let Poland be Poland (film) =

1982 American documentary film

Let Poland be Poland is a documentary film directed by Marty Pasetta and produced by the United States International Communications Agency in cooperation with the United States Department of Defense. It was first broadcast on television on 31 January 1982. The title of the film is a reference to the song "Żeby Polska była Polską" ("Let Poland be Poland"), written by Jan Pietrzak.

== History ==
Let Poland be Poland was seen on television by 185 million viewers in 50 countries around the world. The Voice of America prepared the audio version of the programme in 39 languages. The programme was also broadcast by Radio Free Europe, Radio Liberty and Radio France Internationale.

The film is an account of events of 30 January 1982. That day was proclaimed Solidarity Day.

The programme was hosted by Charlton Heston. Participants included Romuald Spasowski, Zdzisław Rurarz, Adam Makowicz, Czesław Miłosz, Mstislav Rostropovich, Kirk Douglas, Max von Sydow, James A. Michener, Henry Fonda, Glenda Jackson, Benny Andersson, Agnetha Fältskog, Anni-Frid Lyngstad, Paul McCartney, Björn Ulvaeus, Orson Welles, Maggie Albright. The song “Ever Homeward” was sung by Frank Sinatra (a fragment was sung in Polish).

Multiple heads of state and politicians were called during the programme to make their statements. They included President of the United States Ronald Reagan, Prime Minister of the United Kingdom Margaret Thatcher, Prime Minister of Portugal Francisco Pinto Balsemão, Chancellor of the Federal Republic of Germany Helmut Schmidt, Prime Minister of Iceland Gunnar Thoroddsen, Prime Minister of Belgium Wilfried Martens, Prime Minister of Japan Zenkō Suzuki, Prime Minister of Italy Arnaldo Forlani, Prime Minister of Norway Kåre Willoch, Prime Minister of Canada Pierre Trudeau, Prime Minister of Turkey Bülend Ulusu, Prime Minister of Luxembourg Pierre Werner, Prime Minister of Spain Adolfo Suárez González, President of France François Mitterrand, Speaker of the United States House of Representatives Tip O’Neill, Senate Majority Leader Howard Baker, and Chair of the House Foreign Affairs Committee Clement J. Zablocki.

Politicians focused on criticising the authoritarian Polish and Soviet authorities, expressing their support for the Polish people and solidarity with the repressed as well as promising their aid, including material.

The film also showed recordings of demonstrations expressing support for the Poles organised in various cities over the world: New York, London, Brussels, Tokyo, Lisbon, Sydney, Washington, Toronto, and Chicago.

In Poland, the film was first broadcast by TVP Historia on 13 December 2011.

== Bibliography ==
- Getler, Michael: ICA Plans Poland Spectacular. Washington Post, January 28, 1982
- Buhmiller, Elisabeth: The Wick Whirlwind; Reagan's ICA Chief Brings Hollywood Hustle to Washington. Washington Post 1982-05-11
- Kurtz, Howard and Early, Pete: Hollywood-style Diplomacy; Wick Adds Flair to US Story. Washington Post, 1983-07-13
- Better to Let Poland Be? Time Magazine, 1982-02-09
- Danilov, Aleksander: 'Let Poland be Poland': Child of Politics Proved Mentall Deficient. Text of commentary on BBC Summary of World Broadcasts, 1982-02-09
