= Magdalena Smoczyńska =

Polish psycholinguist (born 1947)

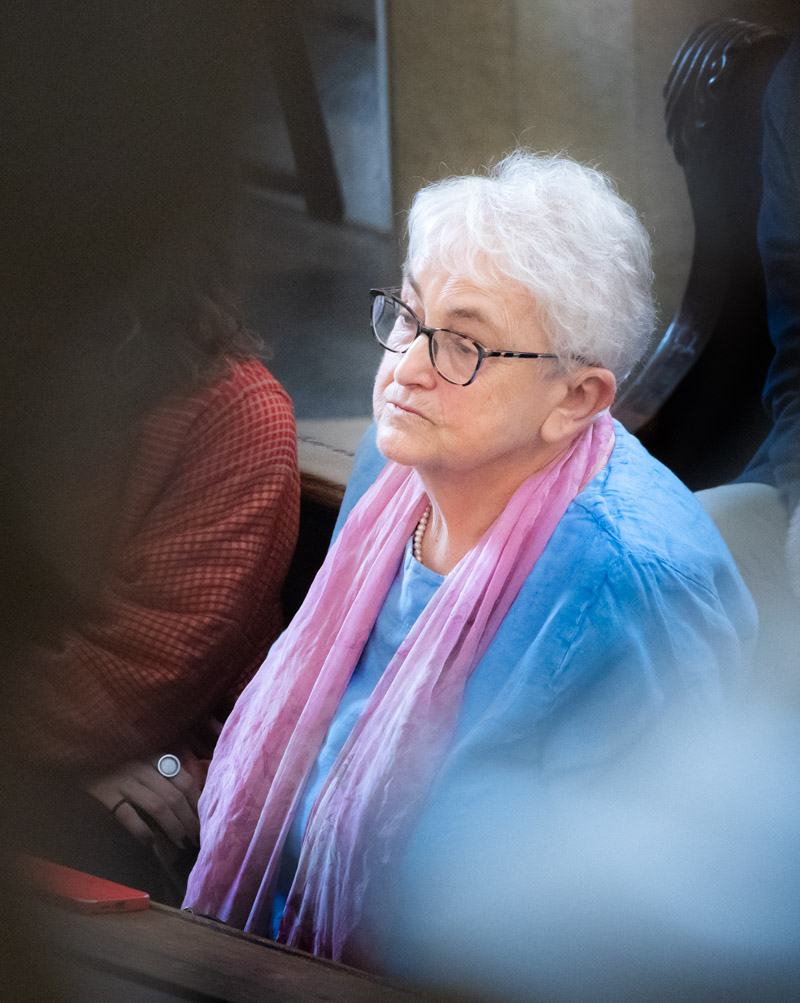
- Magdalena Smoczyńska photographed by Adam Walanus at the Holy Trinity Church in Kraków (Dominican Church), July 2026
- Born: Magdalena Turowicz; 25 April 1947 (age 79); Kraków, Poland
- Education: Jagiellonian University
- Occupation: Psycholinguist
- Spouse: Wojciech Smoczyński
- Children: Wawrzyniec Smoczyński
- Parents: Jerzy Turowicz (father); Anna Turowicz née Gąsiorowska (mother)

Magdalena Smoczyńska née Turowicz (born 25 April 1947) is a Polish psycholinguist and expert in the development of language in children. She is an emeritus reader in the department of linguistics at Jagiellonian University where she was once head of the Child Language Laboratory and studied specific language impairment (SLI) at the Institute for Educational Research (2012–2015).

== Biography ==
She is the daughter of Anna Turowicz née Gąsiorowska and Jerzy Turowicz. In 1970 she graduated in psychology from the Jagiellonian University. She obtained doctorate in 1978 from the Jagiellonian University and a habilitation in 1988.

While much of her research is about language acquisition in Polish-speaking children, it has cross-linguistic and international significance. She has been a visiting professor at the University at Buffalo and the University of Sheffield, and is a life member of the Linguistic Society of America.

She is the first author of the first Polish comprehensive normed language assessment tool for children aged 4–8 years (Test Rozwoju Językowego TRJ, Smoczyńska et al., 2015). She supervised four doctoral dissertations.

She married Wojciech Smoczyński around 1970. Their children are Michał and Maciej (twins born in 1971) and Wawrzyniec (born 1976).
