= List of minor planets: 708001–709000 =

The following is a partial list of minor planets, running from minor-planet number 708001 through 709000, inclusive. The primary data for this and other partial lists is based on JPL's "Small-Body Orbital Elements" and data available from the Minor Planet Center. Critical list information is also provided by the MPC, unless otherwise specified from Lowell Observatory. A detailed description of the table's columns and additional sources are given on the main page including a complete list of every page in this series, and a statistical break-up on the dynamical classification of minor planets.

Also see the summary list of all named bodies in numerical and alphabetical order, and the corresponding naming citations for the number range of this particular list. New namings may only be added to this list after official publication, as the preannouncement of names is condemned by the Working Group for Small Bodies Nomenclature of the International Astronomical Union.

Near-Earth obj.	MBA (inner)	MBA (outer)	Centaur
Mars-crosser	MBA (middle)	Jupiter trojan	Trans-Neptunian obj.
Unclassified

== 708001–708100 ==
Designation			Discovery			Properties		Ref
Permanent	Provisional	Named after	Date	Site	Discoverer(s)	Category	Diam.	Ref
708001	2011 UV_{53}	—	October 4, 2002	Palomar	NEAT	JUN	1.1 km	MPC · JPL
708002	2011 US_{55}	—	October 2, 2002	Haleakala	NEAT	·	1.9 km	MPC · JPL
708003	2011 UG_{57}	—	September 24, 2011	Haleakala	Pan-STARRS 1	·	2.2 km	MPC · JPL
708004	2011 UT_{57}	—	September 30, 2011	Kitt Peak	Spacewatch	·	1.7 km	MPC · JPL
708005	2011 UU_{61}	—	October 21, 2011	Mount Lemmon	Mount Lemmon Survey	HNS	1.1 km	MPC · JPL
708006	2011 UM_{62}	—	September 24, 2011	Mayhill-ISON	L. Elenin	H	440 m	MPC · JPL
708007	2011 UR_{62}	—	October 20, 2011	Haleakala	Pan-STARRS 1	H	540 m	MPC · JPL
708008	2011 UF_{63}	—	October 20, 2011	Haleakala	Pan-STARRS 1	H	690 m	MPC · JPL
708009	2011 UZ_{66}	—	October 20, 2011	Mount Lemmon	Mount Lemmon Survey	·	1.2 km	MPC · JPL
708010	2011 UO_{68}	—	October 21, 2011	Charleston	R. Holmes	·	550 m	MPC · JPL
708011	2011 UE_{74}	—	December 18, 2007	Mount Lemmon	Mount Lemmon Survey	·	1.3 km	MPC · JPL
708012	2011 UO_{78}	—	September 29, 2011	Kitt Peak	Spacewatch	·	1.7 km	MPC · JPL
708013	2011 UY_{78}	—	October 19, 2011	Kitt Peak	Spacewatch	HOF	1.9 km	MPC · JPL
708014	2011 UM_{79}	—	October 19, 2011	Kitt Peak	Spacewatch	·	1.6 km	MPC · JPL
708015	2011 UV_{81}	—	April 17, 2005	Kitt Peak	Spacewatch	·	1.7 km	MPC · JPL
708016	2011 UK_{82}	—	October 19, 2011	Kitt Peak	Spacewatch	GEF	1.0 km	MPC · JPL
708017	2011 UP_{85}	—	April 30, 2009	Kitt Peak	Spacewatch	EUN	1.2 km	MPC · JPL
708018	2011 UC_{90}	—	October 22, 2011	Taunus	Karge, S., R. Kling	HOF	2.3 km	MPC · JPL
708019	2011 UV_{92}	—	September 21, 2011	Kitt Peak	Spacewatch	·	1.2 km	MPC · JPL
708020	2011 UY_{98}	—	October 14, 2007	Mount Lemmon	Mount Lemmon Survey	·	1.3 km	MPC · JPL
708021	2011 UQ_{100}	—	October 20, 2011	Mount Lemmon	Mount Lemmon Survey	·	1.4 km	MPC · JPL
708022	2011 UA_{101}	—	September 21, 2011	Kitt Peak	Spacewatch	(5)	720 m	MPC · JPL
708023	2011 UR_{103}	—	October 20, 2011	Mount Lemmon	Mount Lemmon Survey	·	1.7 km	MPC · JPL
708024	2011 UC_{106}	—	October 22, 2011	Mount Lemmon	Mount Lemmon Survey	·	1.3 km	MPC · JPL
708025	2011 UT_{110}	—	October 21, 2011	Haleakala	Pan-STARRS 1	·	1.5 km	MPC · JPL
708026	2011 UY_{110}	—	October 21, 2011	Haleakala	Pan-STARRS 1	·	560 m	MPC · JPL
708027	2011 UF_{117}	—	August 28, 2006	Kitt Peak	Spacewatch	·	1.5 km	MPC · JPL
708028	2011 UZ_{118}	—	September 15, 2007	Mount Lemmon	Mount Lemmon Survey	·	880 m	MPC · JPL
708029	2011 UL_{119}	—	October 18, 2011	Mount Lemmon	Mount Lemmon Survey	·	880 m	MPC · JPL
708030	2011 UW_{122}	—	September 20, 2011	Kitt Peak	Spacewatch	·	1.9 km	MPC · JPL
708031	2011 UD_{123}	—	October 5, 2002	Socorro	LINEAR	·	1.5 km	MPC · JPL
708032	2011 UN_{124}	—	September 14, 2006	Kitt Peak	Spacewatch	·	1.5 km	MPC · JPL
708033	2011 UJ_{125}	—	September 21, 2011	Kitt Peak	Spacewatch	·	550 m	MPC · JPL
708034	2011 UX_{130}	—	September 27, 2011	Mount Lemmon	Mount Lemmon Survey	·	1.8 km	MPC · JPL
708035	2011 UA_{135}	—	May 11, 2005	Palomar	NEAT	EUN	1.3 km	MPC · JPL
708036	2011 UJ_{135}	—	November 24, 2002	Palomar	NEAT	·	1.9 km	MPC · JPL
708037	2011 UP_{137}	—	October 21, 2011	Kitt Peak	Spacewatch	·	1.7 km	MPC · JPL
708038	2011 UU_{139}	—	October 30, 2002	Palomar	NEAT	·	2.0 km	MPC · JPL
708039	2011 UL_{140}	—	October 23, 2011	Kitt Peak	Spacewatch	·	1.6 km	MPC · JPL
708040	2011 UC_{148}	—	October 18, 2011	Mount Lemmon	Mount Lemmon Survey	HOF	2.2 km	MPC · JPL
708041	2011 UH_{148}	—	September 23, 2011	Haleakala	Pan-STARRS 1	·	540 m	MPC · JPL
708042	2011 UA_{151}	—	October 24, 2011	Haleakala	Pan-STARRS 1	·	1.6 km	MPC · JPL
708043	2011 UV_{154}	—	September 30, 2011	Mount Lemmon	Mount Lemmon Survey	·	710 m	MPC · JPL
708044	2011 UQ_{155}	—	October 24, 2011	Mount Lemmon	Mount Lemmon Survey	·	630 m	MPC · JPL
708045	2011 UN_{160}	—	October 20, 2011	Mount Lemmon	Mount Lemmon Survey	·	1.5 km	MPC · JPL
708046	2011 UH_{166}	—	October 26, 2011	Haleakala	Pan-STARRS 1	·	1.9 km	MPC · JPL
708047	2011 UR_{166}	—	November 23, 2002	Palomar	NEAT	·	1.7 km	MPC · JPL
708048	2011 UX_{167}	—	October 23, 2011	Mount Lemmon	Mount Lemmon Survey	AGN	1.1 km	MPC · JPL
708049	2011 UR_{169}	—	October 21, 2011	Mount Lemmon	Mount Lemmon Survey	·	1.4 km	MPC · JPL
708050	2011 UO_{170}	—	September 23, 2011	Mayhill-ISON	L. Elenin	·	780 m	MPC · JPL
708051	2011 UL_{176}	—	September 18, 2006	Kitt Peak	Spacewatch	·	1.4 km	MPC · JPL
708052	2011 UU_{177}	—	August 17, 2002	Palomar	NEAT	·	1.3 km	MPC · JPL
708053	2011 UL_{180}	—	November 9, 2007	Mount Lemmon	Mount Lemmon Survey	·	1.2 km	MPC · JPL
708054	2011 UX_{181}	—	October 20, 2011	Kitt Peak	Spacewatch	·	1.5 km	MPC · JPL
708055	2011 UF_{196}	—	March 2, 2009	Mount Lemmon	Mount Lemmon Survey	·	1.8 km	MPC · JPL
708056	2011 UX_{200}	—	October 25, 2011	XuYi	PMO NEO Survey Program	GEF	1.1 km	MPC · JPL
708057	2011 UY_{200}	—	October 25, 2011	XuYi	PMO NEO Survey Program	GEF	1.1 km	MPC · JPL
708058	2011 UD_{205}	—	September 24, 2011	Haleakala	Pan-STARRS 1	DOR	2.0 km	MPC · JPL
708059	2011 UN_{207}	—	August 19, 2006	Kitt Peak	Spacewatch	·	1.2 km	MPC · JPL
708060	2011 UB_{208}	—	March 18, 2009	Kitt Peak	Spacewatch	·	1.7 km	MPC · JPL
708061	2011 UJ_{211}	—	September 30, 2011	Kitt Peak	Spacewatch	·	1.4 km	MPC · JPL
708062	2011 UE_{214}	—	October 24, 2011	Mount Lemmon	Mount Lemmon Survey	·	1.8 km	MPC · JPL
708063	2011 UC_{215}	—	December 5, 2007	Kitt Peak	Spacewatch	HOF	1.9 km	MPC · JPL
708064	2011 UX_{215}	—	October 24, 2011	Mount Lemmon	Mount Lemmon Survey	·	1.3 km	MPC · JPL
708065	2011 UR_{216}	—	February 28, 2014	Haleakala	Pan-STARRS 1	·	2.0 km	MPC · JPL
708066	2011 UX_{216}	—	October 24, 2011	Kitt Peak	Spacewatch	·	1.2 km	MPC · JPL
708067	2011 UN_{221}	—	October 24, 2011	Mount Lemmon	Mount Lemmon Survey	·	1.4 km	MPC · JPL
708068	2011 UG_{222}	—	October 24, 2011	Mount Lemmon	Mount Lemmon Survey	AGN	1.0 km	MPC · JPL
708069	2011 UG_{223}	—	October 24, 2011	Mount Lemmon	Mount Lemmon Survey	·	1.6 km	MPC · JPL
708070	2011 UQ_{223}	—	October 24, 2011	Mount Lemmon	Mount Lemmon Survey	·	1.9 km	MPC · JPL
708071	2011 UF_{225}	—	March 13, 2005	Mount Lemmon	Mount Lemmon Survey	JUN	1.1 km	MPC · JPL
708072	2011 UD_{227}	—	September 20, 2011	Kitt Peak	Spacewatch	THM	2.2 km	MPC · JPL
708073	2011 UW_{230}	—	October 19, 2011	Mount Lemmon	Mount Lemmon Survey	AST	1.4 km	MPC · JPL
708074	2011 UE_{239}	—	October 24, 2011	Haleakala	Pan-STARRS 1	·	1.5 km	MPC · JPL
708075	2011 UT_{239}	—	September 26, 2006	Kitt Peak	Spacewatch	HOF	1.8 km	MPC · JPL
708076	2011 UR_{242}	—	September 20, 2006	Catalina	CSS	·	1.7 km	MPC · JPL
708077	2011 UD_{249}	—	October 26, 2011	Haleakala	Pan-STARRS 1	·	1.4 km	MPC · JPL
708078	2011 UW_{253}	—	April 20, 2009	Mount Lemmon	Mount Lemmon Survey	·	1.6 km	MPC · JPL
708079	2011 UW_{258}	—	October 24, 2011	Haleakala	Pan-STARRS 1	·	2.0 km	MPC · JPL
708080	2011 UV_{261}	—	October 25, 2011	Haleakala	Pan-STARRS 1	·	1.5 km	MPC · JPL
708081	2011 US_{262}	—	October 21, 2011	Mount Lemmon	Mount Lemmon Survey	·	2.1 km	MPC · JPL
708082	2011 UV_{264}	—	October 26, 2011	Kitt Peak	Spacewatch	VER	1.8 km	MPC · JPL
708083	2011 UL_{270}	—	November 17, 2006	Mount Lemmon	Mount Lemmon Survey	·	1.3 km	MPC · JPL
708084	2011 UK_{273}	—	November 9, 2007	Mount Lemmon	Mount Lemmon Survey	·	1.7 km	MPC · JPL
708085	2011 UM_{274}	—	October 22, 2011	Mount Lemmon	Mount Lemmon Survey	KOR	1.0 km	MPC · JPL
708086	2011 UV_{276}	—	October 25, 2011	Haleakala	Pan-STARRS 1	·	1.4 km	MPC · JPL
708087	2011 UZ_{277}	—	October 25, 2011	Haleakala	Pan-STARRS 1	·	2.1 km	MPC · JPL
708088	2011 UP_{285}	—	August 18, 2006	Palomar	NEAT	·	1.9 km	MPC · JPL
708089	2011 UP_{286}	—	October 1, 2011	Kitt Peak	Spacewatch	·	1.5 km	MPC · JPL
708090	2011 UF_{295}	—	October 27, 2011	Zelenchukskaya Station	Satovski, B.	·	1.8 km	MPC · JPL
708091	2011 UZ_{296}	—	January 18, 2008	Mount Lemmon	Mount Lemmon Survey	HOF	2.3 km	MPC · JPL
708092	2011 UM_{298}	—	October 29, 2011	Kitt Peak	Spacewatch	·	1.6 km	MPC · JPL
708093	2011 UW_{302}	—	October 31, 2011	Mount Lemmon	Mount Lemmon Survey	·	2.3 km	MPC · JPL
708094	2011 UQ_{303}	—	October 18, 2011	Mount Lemmon	Mount Lemmon Survey	·	1.8 km	MPC · JPL
708095	2011 UX_{303}	—	November 17, 2007	Mount Lemmon	Mount Lemmon Survey	(194)	1.5 km	MPC · JPL
708096	2011 UY_{305}	—	September 28, 2011	Kitt Peak	Spacewatch	AEO	900 m	MPC · JPL
708097	2011 UV_{306}	—	September 24, 2011	Haleakala	Pan-STARRS 1	·	1.3 km	MPC · JPL
708098	2011 UQ_{312}	—	August 27, 2006	Kitt Peak	Spacewatch	(12739)	1.4 km	MPC · JPL
708099	2011 US_{319}	—	October 30, 2011	Mount Lemmon	Mount Lemmon Survey	EOS	1.4 km	MPC · JPL
708100	2011 UW_{320}	—	October 31, 2011	Alder Springs	Levin, K.	·	1.4 km	MPC · JPL

== 708101–708200 ==
back to top

Designation			Discovery			Properties		Ref
Permanent	Provisional	Named after	Date	Site	Discoverer(s)	Category	Diam.	Ref
708101	2011 UC_{321}	—	December 16, 2007	Mount Lemmon	Mount Lemmon Survey	ADE	1.4 km	MPC · JPL
708102	2011 UZ_{323}	—	October 18, 2011	Haleakala	Pan-STARRS 1	·	1.9 km	MPC · JPL
708103	2011 UP_{324}	—	October 19, 2011	Mount Lemmon	Mount Lemmon Survey	·	1.4 km	MPC · JPL
708104	2011 UE_{326}	—	October 20, 2011	Mount Lemmon	Mount Lemmon Survey	AGN	910 m	MPC · JPL
708105	2011 UW_{327}	—	August 15, 2006	Palomar	NEAT	·	2.0 km	MPC · JPL
708106	2011 UD_{329}	—	September 28, 2011	Kitt Peak	Spacewatch	·	1.4 km	MPC · JPL
708107	2011 UC_{330}	—	December 13, 2006	Mount Lemmon	Mount Lemmon Survey	HYG	2.4 km	MPC · JPL
708108	2011 UQ_{330}	—	December 31, 2007	Kitt Peak	Spacewatch	GEF	1.1 km	MPC · JPL
708109	2011 UP_{332}	—	December 31, 2007	Kitt Peak	Spacewatch	·	1.6 km	MPC · JPL
708110	2011 UA_{341}	—	April 10, 2010	Mount Lemmon	Mount Lemmon Survey	·	620 m	MPC · JPL
708111	2011 UP_{341}	—	September 22, 2011	Kitt Peak	Spacewatch	·	1.4 km	MPC · JPL
708112	2011 UU_{343}	—	October 18, 2011	Haleakala	Pan-STARRS 1	·	1.5 km	MPC · JPL
708113	2011 UT_{344}	—	September 21, 2011	Mount Lemmon	Mount Lemmon Survey	·	1.4 km	MPC · JPL
708114	2011 UF_{346}	—	May 5, 2009	Kitt Peak	Spacewatch	·	2.4 km	MPC · JPL
708115	2011 UD_{347}	—	September 23, 2011	Haleakala	Pan-STARRS 1	·	2.6 km	MPC · JPL
708116	2011 UO_{349}	—	October 19, 2011	Mount Lemmon	Mount Lemmon Survey	NYS	800 m	MPC · JPL
708117	2011 UQ_{352}	—	August 27, 2006	Kitt Peak	Spacewatch	·	1.4 km	MPC · JPL
708118	2011 UO_{354}	—	October 20, 2011	Mount Lemmon	Mount Lemmon Survey	KOR	1.2 km	MPC · JPL
708119	2011 UR_{361}	—	October 21, 2011	Mount Lemmon	Mount Lemmon Survey	·	1.9 km	MPC · JPL
708120	2011 UT_{367}	—	October 22, 2011	Mount Lemmon	Mount Lemmon Survey	GEF	1.0 km	MPC · JPL
708121	2011 UO_{369}	—	October 23, 2011	Taunus	Karge, S., R. Kling	·	1.6 km	MPC · JPL
708122	2011 UG_{371}	—	October 23, 2011	Mount Lemmon	Mount Lemmon Survey	·	1.2 km	MPC · JPL
708123	2011 UG_{372}	—	October 23, 2011	Mount Lemmon	Mount Lemmon Survey	·	2.0 km	MPC · JPL
708124	2011 US_{372}	—	October 23, 2011	Mount Lemmon	Mount Lemmon Survey	·	1.3 km	MPC · JPL
708125	2011 UN_{374}	—	October 23, 2011	Haleakala	Pan-STARRS 1	·	2.1 km	MPC · JPL
708126	2011 UC_{376}	—	August 27, 2006	Kitt Peak	Spacewatch	PAD	1.4 km	MPC · JPL
708127	2011 UV_{376}	—	September 17, 2006	Kitt Peak	Spacewatch	·	1.7 km	MPC · JPL
708128	2011 UD_{382}	—	September 25, 2011	Haleakala	Pan-STARRS 1	·	1.5 km	MPC · JPL
708129	2011 UF_{383}	—	October 24, 2011	Haleakala	Pan-STARRS 1	·	1.4 km	MPC · JPL
708130	2011 UT_{384}	—	October 24, 2011	Haleakala	Pan-STARRS 1	·	670 m	MPC · JPL
708131	2011 UV_{386}	—	December 19, 2007	Mount Lemmon	Mount Lemmon Survey	GEF	1.2 km	MPC · JPL
708132	2011 UA_{389}	—	October 25, 2011	XuYi	PMO NEO Survey Program	·	1.7 km	MPC · JPL
708133	2011 UD_{390}	—	October 26, 2011	Mayhill-ISON	L. Elenin	GEF	1.0 km	MPC · JPL
708134	2011 UB_{392}	—	October 20, 2011	Haleakala	Pan-STARRS 1	ADE	1.7 km	MPC · JPL
708135	2011 UG_{392}	—	September 29, 2011	Kitt Peak	Spacewatch	MRX	800 m	MPC · JPL
708136	2011 UL_{392}	—	October 7, 2007	Mount Lemmon	Mount Lemmon Survey	·	2.4 km	MPC · JPL
708137	2011 UM_{393}	—	October 20, 2011	Mount Lemmon	Mount Lemmon Survey	·	1.7 km	MPC · JPL
708138	2011 UP_{395}	—	September 24, 2011	Haleakala	Pan-STARRS 1	·	2.1 km	MPC · JPL
708139	2011 UZ_{397}	—	January 17, 2008	Mount Lemmon	Mount Lemmon Survey	·	1.7 km	MPC · JPL
708140	2011 UR_{398}	—	February 18, 2004	Kitt Peak	Spacewatch	·	1.8 km	MPC · JPL
708141	2011 US_{401}	—	October 21, 2011	Mount Lemmon	Mount Lemmon Survey	·	2.0 km	MPC · JPL
708142	2011 UB_{404}	—	September 18, 2006	Kitt Peak	Spacewatch	·	1.7 km	MPC · JPL
708143	2011 UG_{407}	—	July 29, 2002	Palomar	NEAT	·	1.6 km	MPC · JPL
708144	2011 UL_{415}	—	October 26, 2011	Haleakala	Pan-STARRS 1	·	1.3 km	MPC · JPL
708145	2011 US_{415}	—	November 4, 2007	Kitt Peak	Spacewatch	·	1.4 km	MPC · JPL
708146	2011 UH_{416}	—	October 24, 2011	Haleakala	Pan-STARRS 1	·	2.2 km	MPC · JPL
708147	2011 UB_{418}	—	October 24, 2011	Haleakala	Pan-STARRS 1	·	1.9 km	MPC · JPL
708148	2011 UH_{418}	—	October 25, 2011	Haleakala	Pan-STARRS 1	·	1.4 km	MPC · JPL
708149	2011 UR_{418}	—	October 19, 2011	Mount Lemmon	Mount Lemmon Survey	·	810 m	MPC · JPL
708150	2011 UT_{418}	—	November 19, 2007	Kitt Peak	Spacewatch	·	1.2 km	MPC · JPL
708151	2011 UY_{419}	—	October 26, 2011	Haleakala	Pan-STARRS 1	·	660 m	MPC · JPL
708152	2011 UZ_{419}	—	April 30, 2014	Haleakala	Pan-STARRS 1	·	1.9 km	MPC · JPL
708153	2011 UC_{420}	—	January 22, 2013	Mount Lemmon	Mount Lemmon Survey	EOS	1.5 km	MPC · JPL
708154	2011 UL_{420}	—	April 6, 2014	Mount Lemmon	Mount Lemmon Survey	·	1.3 km	MPC · JPL
708155	2011 UM_{420}	—	June 11, 2015	Haleakala	Pan-STARRS 1	·	2.5 km	MPC · JPL
708156	2011 UG_{421}	—	October 22, 2011	Mount Lemmon	Mount Lemmon Survey	·	1.9 km	MPC · JPL
708157	2011 UF_{422}	—	October 28, 2011	Mount Lemmon	Mount Lemmon Survey	EUN	1.0 km	MPC · JPL
708158	2011 UG_{422}	—	October 21, 2011	Kitt Peak	Spacewatch	HOF	2.2 km	MPC · JPL
708159	2011 UO_{422}	—	January 19, 2013	Kitt Peak	Spacewatch	·	1.6 km	MPC · JPL
708160	2011 UT_{422}	—	October 23, 2011	Haleakala	Pan-STARRS 1	·	1.9 km	MPC · JPL
708161	2011 UG_{423}	—	January 19, 2013	Kitt Peak	Spacewatch	·	1.5 km	MPC · JPL
708162	2011 UH_{423}	—	April 30, 2004	Kitt Peak	Spacewatch	·	1.8 km	MPC · JPL
708163	2011 UO_{423}	—	June 3, 2014	Haleakala	Pan-STARRS 1	·	1.9 km	MPC · JPL
708164	2011 UL_{425}	—	October 24, 2011	Haleakala	Pan-STARRS 1	·	1.8 km	MPC · JPL
708165	2011 UH_{426}	—	October 18, 2011	Mount Lemmon	Mount Lemmon Survey	·	530 m	MPC · JPL
708166	2011 UW_{433}	—	October 24, 2011	Haleakala	Pan-STARRS 1	·	1.0 km	MPC · JPL
708167	2011 UU_{435}	—	July 25, 2015	Haleakala	Pan-STARRS 1	·	1.5 km	MPC · JPL
708168	2011 UT_{441}	—	June 22, 2015	Haleakala	Pan-STARRS 1	·	1.9 km	MPC · JPL
708169	2011 UF_{442}	—	October 22, 2011	Mount Lemmon	Mount Lemmon Survey	·	1.7 km	MPC · JPL
708170	2011 UA_{443}	—	October 23, 2011	Mount Lemmon	Mount Lemmon Survey	·	550 m	MPC · JPL
708171	2011 UB_{443}	—	October 26, 2011	Haleakala	Pan-STARRS 1	·	1.6 km	MPC · JPL
708172	2011 UZ_{446}	—	October 26, 2011	Haleakala	Pan-STARRS 1	HYG	2.6 km	MPC · JPL
708173	2011 UC_{447}	—	October 26, 2011	Haleakala	Pan-STARRS 1	·	2.3 km	MPC · JPL
708174	2011 UE_{448}	—	October 19, 2011	Mount Lemmon	Mount Lemmon Survey	·	1.2 km	MPC · JPL
708175	2011 UJ_{448}	—	October 19, 2011	Mount Lemmon	Mount Lemmon Survey	·	860 m	MPC · JPL
708176	2011 US_{448}	—	October 24, 2011	Mount Lemmon	Mount Lemmon Survey	·	1.0 km	MPC · JPL
708177	2011 UW_{448}	—	October 24, 2011	Haleakala	Pan-STARRS 1	AGN	940 m	MPC · JPL
708178	2011 UE_{449}	—	June 23, 2015	Haleakala	Pan-STARRS 1	·	1.8 km	MPC · JPL
708179	2011 UZ_{449}	—	October 22, 2011	Mount Lemmon	Mount Lemmon Survey	·	590 m	MPC · JPL
708180	2011 UQ_{452}	—	October 24, 2011	Kitt Peak	Spacewatch	V	510 m	MPC · JPL
708181	2011 UT_{452}	—	October 26, 2011	Haleakala	Pan-STARRS 1	·	2.0 km	MPC · JPL
708182	2011 UJ_{455}	—	October 24, 2011	Haleakala	Pan-STARRS 1	KOR	1.1 km	MPC · JPL
708183	2011 UN_{455}	—	October 25, 2011	Haleakala	Pan-STARRS 1	·	920 m	MPC · JPL
708184	2011 UT_{455}	—	October 24, 2011	Mount Lemmon	Mount Lemmon Survey	·	620 m	MPC · JPL
708185	2011 UU_{455}	—	October 25, 2011	Haleakala	Pan-STARRS 1	·	1.7 km	MPC · JPL
708186	2011 UB_{456}	—	October 22, 2011	Mount Lemmon	Mount Lemmon Survey	·	1.5 km	MPC · JPL
708187	2011 UG_{456}	—	October 23, 2011	Haleakala	Pan-STARRS 1	·	1.6 km	MPC · JPL
708188	2011 UR_{458}	—	October 24, 2011	Haleakala	Pan-STARRS 1	PAD	1.4 km	MPC · JPL
708189	2011 UN_{459}	—	October 24, 2011	Mount Lemmon	Mount Lemmon Survey	·	1.7 km	MPC · JPL
708190	2011 UE_{461}	—	October 27, 2011	Mount Lemmon	Mount Lemmon Survey	AGN	1.0 km	MPC · JPL
708191	2011 UG_{462}	—	October 19, 2011	Mount Lemmon	Mount Lemmon Survey	·	1.6 km	MPC · JPL
708192	2011 UB_{463}	—	October 17, 2011	Kitt Peak	Spacewatch	HOF	2.0 km	MPC · JPL
708193	2011 UH_{464}	—	October 21, 2011	Mount Lemmon	Mount Lemmon Survey	AGN	900 m	MPC · JPL
708194	2011 UJ_{465}	—	October 20, 2011	Mount Lemmon	Mount Lemmon Survey	·	1.6 km	MPC · JPL
708195	2011 UN_{468}	—	October 25, 2011	Haleakala	Pan-STARRS 1	·	630 m	MPC · JPL
708196	2011 UV_{468}	—	October 26, 2011	Haleakala	Pan-STARRS 1	WIT	820 m	MPC · JPL
708197	2011 UC_{469}	—	October 20, 2011	Mount Lemmon	Mount Lemmon Survey	·	1.7 km	MPC · JPL
708198	2011 UG_{469}	—	October 24, 2011	Haleakala	Pan-STARRS 1	·	1.7 km	MPC · JPL
708199	2011 UR_{471}	—	October 25, 2011	Haleakala	Pan-STARRS 1	·	1.7 km	MPC · JPL
708200	2011 UJ_{480}	—	October 24, 2011	Haleakala	Pan-STARRS 1	·	1.9 km	MPC · JPL

== 708201–708300 ==
back to top

Designation			Discovery			Properties		Ref
Permanent	Provisional	Named after	Date	Site	Discoverer(s)	Category	Diam.	Ref
708201	2011 UY_{480}	—	October 24, 2011	Haleakala	Pan-STARRS 1	AGN	830 m	MPC · JPL
708202	2011 UC_{484}	—	October 24, 2011	Haleakala	Pan-STARRS 1	·	1.1 km	MPC · JPL
708203	2011 UV_{487}	—	October 25, 2011	Haleakala	Pan-STARRS 1	·	1.3 km	MPC · JPL
708204	2011 UN_{489}	—	October 23, 2011	Haleakala	Pan-STARRS 1	EOS	1.2 km	MPC · JPL
708205	2011 US_{489}	—	May 7, 2014	Haleakala	Pan-STARRS 1	PAD	1.2 km	MPC · JPL
708206	2011 UX_{490}	—	October 24, 2011	Haleakala	Pan-STARRS 1	·	1.6 km	MPC · JPL
708207	2011 UO_{491}	—	October 24, 2011	Mount Lemmon	Mount Lemmon Survey	KOR	930 m	MPC · JPL
708208	2011 UK_{499}	—	October 26, 2011	Haleakala	Pan-STARRS 1	HYG	2.5 km	MPC · JPL
708209	2011 UQ_{499}	—	October 31, 2011	Mount Lemmon	Mount Lemmon Survey	·	2.5 km	MPC · JPL
708210	2011 UQ_{501}	—	October 18, 2011	Kitt Peak	Spacewatch	·	1.3 km	MPC · JPL
708211	2011 UT_{502}	—	January 10, 2013	Haleakala	Pan-STARRS 1	PAD	1.2 km	MPC · JPL
708212	2011 UQ_{503}	—	October 24, 2011	Haleakala	Pan-STARRS 1	·	1.8 km	MPC · JPL
708213	2011 VL_{5}	—	November 3, 2011	Mount Lemmon	Mount Lemmon Survey	H	430 m	MPC · JPL
708214	2011 VX_{6}	—	October 26, 2011	Haleakala	Pan-STARRS 1	·	2.2 km	MPC · JPL
708215	2011 VC_{15}	—	November 15, 2011	Mount Lemmon	Mount Lemmon Survey	PAD	1.4 km	MPC · JPL
708216	2011 VR_{22}	—	January 15, 2008	Mount Lemmon	Mount Lemmon Survey	·	2.2 km	MPC · JPL
708217	2011 VS_{24}	—	November 3, 2011	Mount Lemmon	Mount Lemmon Survey	·	1.4 km	MPC · JPL
708218	2011 VJ_{25}	—	November 2, 2011	Mount Lemmon	Mount Lemmon Survey	MAR	1.1 km	MPC · JPL
708219	2011 VA_{26}	—	November 15, 2011	Kitt Peak	Spacewatch	·	1.9 km	MPC · JPL
708220	2011 VG_{26}	—	February 10, 2014	Haleakala	Pan-STARRS 1	·	2.4 km	MPC · JPL
708221	2011 VT_{26}	—	May 23, 2014	Haleakala	Pan-STARRS 1	·	2.0 km	MPC · JPL
708222	2011 VF_{29}	—	April 30, 2014	Haleakala	Pan-STARRS 1	·	1.7 km	MPC · JPL
708223	2011 VP_{32}	—	November 15, 2011	Mount Lemmon	Mount Lemmon Survey	·	1.3 km	MPC · JPL
708224	2011 VA_{36}	—	November 1, 2011	Kitt Peak	Spacewatch	KOR	1.1 km	MPC · JPL
708225	2011 WB_{1}	—	November 5, 2002	Socorro	LINEAR	·	1.7 km	MPC · JPL
708226	2011 WM_{13}	—	October 7, 2002	Palomar	NEAT	·	1.5 km	MPC · JPL
708227	2011 WE_{23}	—	September 26, 2006	Kitt Peak	Spacewatch	·	1.4 km	MPC · JPL
708228	2011 WK_{26}	—	November 1, 2011	Kitt Peak	Spacewatch	·	560 m	MPC · JPL
708229	2011 WP_{33}	—	November 18, 2011	Mount Lemmon	Mount Lemmon Survey	·	1.6 km	MPC · JPL
708230	2011 WQ_{42}	—	August 14, 2006	Siding Spring	SSS	·	1.8 km	MPC · JPL
708231	2011 WA_{45}	—	November 23, 2011	Mount Lemmon	Mount Lemmon Survey	·	1.6 km	MPC · JPL
708232	2011 WP_{55}	—	March 23, 2004	Kitt Peak	Spacewatch	·	1.7 km	MPC · JPL
708233	2011 WH_{57}	—	November 24, 2011	Haleakala	Pan-STARRS 1	·	1.8 km	MPC · JPL
708234	2011 WB_{58}	—	January 18, 2008	Kitt Peak	Spacewatch	HOF	2.2 km	MPC · JPL
708235	2011 WK_{59}	—	October 21, 2011	Mount Lemmon	Mount Lemmon Survey	AGN	970 m	MPC · JPL
708236	2011 WS_{61}	—	October 19, 2011	Mount Lemmon	Mount Lemmon Survey	·	1.6 km	MPC · JPL
708237	2011 WN_{67}	—	November 26, 2011	Mount Lemmon	Mount Lemmon Survey	·	640 m	MPC · JPL
708238	2011 WY_{71}	—	September 19, 2006	Catalina	CSS	·	2.0 km	MPC · JPL
708239	2011 WP_{79}	—	November 22, 2011	Mount Lemmon	Mount Lemmon Survey	·	1.8 km	MPC · JPL
708240	2011 WO_{83}	—	November 24, 2011	Haleakala	Pan-STARRS 1	·	580 m	MPC · JPL
708241	2011 WP_{91}	—	October 14, 2007	Mount Lemmon	Mount Lemmon Survey	·	2.0 km	MPC · JPL
708242	2011 WG_{97}	—	October 21, 2011	Mount Lemmon	Mount Lemmon Survey	·	1.6 km	MPC · JPL
708243	2011 WG_{99}	—	February 12, 2008	Mount Lemmon	Mount Lemmon Survey	TRE	1.9 km	MPC · JPL
708244	2011 WZ_{99}	—	November 26, 2011	Mount Lemmon	Mount Lemmon Survey	DOR	1.6 km	MPC · JPL
708245	2011 WJ_{100}	—	November 22, 2011	Catalina	CSS	·	1.8 km	MPC · JPL
708246	2011 WF_{102}	—	October 26, 2011	Haleakala	Pan-STARRS 1	·	1.6 km	MPC · JPL
708247	2011 WV_{103}	—	November 2, 2011	Mount Lemmon	Mount Lemmon Survey	·	1.5 km	MPC · JPL
708248	2011 WT_{109}	—	September 17, 2006	Kitt Peak	Spacewatch	·	1.6 km	MPC · JPL
708249	2011 WG_{128}	—	October 18, 2011	Mount Lemmon	Mount Lemmon Survey	·	1.3 km	MPC · JPL
708250	2011 WV_{140}	—	February 2, 2009	Kitt Peak	Spacewatch	·	590 m	MPC · JPL
708251	2011 WJ_{141}	—	October 24, 2011	Haleakala	Pan-STARRS 1	·	2.0 km	MPC · JPL
708252	2011 WG_{142}	—	October 31, 2011	Kitt Peak	Spacewatch	·	1.8 km	MPC · JPL
708253	2011 WR_{142}	—	November 23, 2011	Kitt Peak	Spacewatch	·	2.1 km	MPC · JPL
708254	2011 WA_{144}	—	November 24, 2011	Mayhill-ISON	L. Elenin	·	2.2 km	MPC · JPL
708255	2011 WZ_{144}	—	November 1, 2011	Mount Lemmon	Mount Lemmon Survey	·	700 m	MPC · JPL
708256	2011 WV_{152}	—	November 24, 2011	Palomar	Palomar Transient Factory	·	1.8 km	MPC · JPL
708257	2011 WY_{155}	—	October 2, 2006	Mount Lemmon	Mount Lemmon Survey	·	1.9 km	MPC · JPL
708258	2011 WG_{161}	—	November 18, 2011	Mount Lemmon	Mount Lemmon Survey	·	1.9 km	MPC · JPL
708259	2011 WX_{161}	—	May 7, 2014	Haleakala	Pan-STARRS 1	·	1.5 km	MPC · JPL
708260	2011 WO_{163}	—	November 30, 2011	Kitt Peak	Spacewatch	·	2.0 km	MPC · JPL
708261	2011 WB_{170}	—	November 17, 2011	Mount Lemmon	Mount Lemmon Survey	·	480 m	MPC · JPL
708262	2011 WY_{170}	—	June 4, 2014	Haleakala	Pan-STARRS 1	·	2.1 km	MPC · JPL
708263	2011 WG_{171}	—	April 5, 2014	Haleakala	Pan-STARRS 1	·	1.4 km	MPC · JPL
708264	2011 WL_{173}	—	October 29, 2011	Zelenchukskaya Station	Satovski, B.	EOS	1.4 km	MPC · JPL
708265	2011 WF_{174}	—	November 23, 2011	Kitt Peak	Spacewatch	·	1.6 km	MPC · JPL
708266	2011 WQ_{174}	—	November 26, 2011	Mount Lemmon	Mount Lemmon Survey	·	810 m	MPC · JPL
708267	2011 WS_{175}	—	November 18, 2011	Mount Lemmon	Mount Lemmon Survey	·	1.7 km	MPC · JPL
708268	2011 WR_{176}	—	November 24, 2011	Mount Lemmon	Mount Lemmon Survey	·	1.7 km	MPC · JPL
708269	2011 WB_{177}	—	November 24, 2011	Mount Lemmon	Mount Lemmon Survey	·	1.9 km	MPC · JPL
708270	2011 WQ_{177}	—	November 28, 2011	Kitt Peak	Spacewatch	GEF	1.0 km	MPC · JPL
708271	2011 WU_{177}	—	November 28, 2011	Kitt Peak	Spacewatch	·	530 m	MPC · JPL
708272	2011 WT_{178}	—	November 18, 2011	Kitt Peak	Spacewatch	·	1.7 km	MPC · JPL
708273	2011 WV_{182}	—	November 29, 2011	Mount Lemmon	Mount Lemmon Survey	H	470 m	MPC · JPL
708274	2011 WW_{183}	—	November 22, 2011	Mount Lemmon	Mount Lemmon Survey	·	1.4 km	MPC · JPL
708275	2011 WD_{186}	—	November 26, 2011	Mount Lemmon	Mount Lemmon Survey	·	1.4 km	MPC · JPL
708276	2011 XY_{1}	—	December 6, 2011	Haleakala	Pan-STARRS 1	L4 · ERY	6.8 km	MPC · JPL
708277	2011 XD_{5}	—	July 27, 2014	Haleakala	Pan-STARRS 1	·	1.9 km	MPC · JPL
708278	2011 YV_{6}	—	December 20, 2011	Zadko	Todd, M.	·	790 m	MPC · JPL
708279	2011 YA_{8}	—	February 17, 2007	Mount Lemmon	Mount Lemmon Survey	·	1.5 km	MPC · JPL
708280	2011 YT_{9}	—	December 6, 2011	Haleakala	Pan-STARRS 1	·	2.9 km	MPC · JPL
708281	2011 YN_{11}	—	January 10, 2007	Mount Lemmon	Mount Lemmon Survey	·	1.7 km	MPC · JPL
708282	2011 YD_{13}	—	November 17, 2011	Mount Lemmon	Mount Lemmon Survey	·	1.5 km	MPC · JPL
708283	2011 YM_{13}	—	December 25, 2011	Mount Lemmon	Mount Lemmon Survey	EOS	1.5 km	MPC · JPL
708284	2011 YP_{21}	—	December 24, 2011	Catalina	CSS	·	2.4 km	MPC · JPL
708285	2011 YE_{27}	—	December 27, 2011	Mount Lemmon	Mount Lemmon Survey	·	2.8 km	MPC · JPL
708286	2011 YU_{30}	—	November 5, 2002	Mount Nyukasa	National Aerospace Laboratory of Japan	MIS	2.1 km	MPC · JPL
708287	2011 YV_{42}	—	September 16, 2010	Mount Lemmon	Mount Lemmon Survey	·	2.4 km	MPC · JPL
708288	2011 YY_{45}	—	December 27, 2011	Kitt Peak	Spacewatch	·	1.8 km	MPC · JPL
708289	2011 YJ_{46}	—	December 27, 2011	Kitt Peak	Spacewatch	·	1.7 km	MPC · JPL
708290	2011 YT_{52}	—	December 27, 2011	Mount Lemmon	Mount Lemmon Survey	·	600 m	MPC · JPL
708291	2011 YU_{54}	—	December 20, 2011	Oukaïmeden	M. Ory	DOR	2.0 km	MPC · JPL
708292	2011 YV_{54}	—	December 29, 2011	Kitt Peak	Spacewatch	·	920 m	MPC · JPL
708293	2011 YA_{60}	—	October 30, 2010	Mount Lemmon	Mount Lemmon Survey	·	2.4 km	MPC · JPL
708294	2011 YO_{61}	—	December 30, 2011	Mount Lemmon	Mount Lemmon Survey	·	2.3 km	MPC · JPL
708295	2011 YN_{66}	—	December 31, 2011	Kitt Peak	Spacewatch	·	680 m	MPC · JPL
708296	2011 YA_{67}	—	December 31, 2011	Kitt Peak	Spacewatch	·	1.4 km	MPC · JPL
708297	2011 YX_{74}	—	December 31, 2011	Kitt Peak	Spacewatch	·	660 m	MPC · JPL
708298	2011 YV_{79}	—	December 25, 2011	Charleston	R. Holmes	PHO	710 m	MPC · JPL
708299	2011 YX_{80}	—	October 22, 2006	Mount Lemmon	Mount Lemmon Survey	·	1.5 km	MPC · JPL
708300	2011 YE_{82}	—	December 27, 2011	Mount Lemmon	Mount Lemmon Survey	·	1.8 km	MPC · JPL

== 708301–708400 ==
back to top

Designation			Discovery			Properties		Ref
Permanent	Provisional	Named after	Date	Site	Discoverer(s)	Category	Diam.	Ref
708301	2011 YO_{82}	—	November 24, 2011	Mount Lemmon	Mount Lemmon Survey	·	1.6 km	MPC · JPL
708302	2011 YR_{86}	—	January 28, 2017	Mount Lemmon	Mount Lemmon Survey	MAR	1.0 km	MPC · JPL
708303	2011 YV_{86}	—	April 20, 2017	Haleakala	Pan-STARRS 1	(5)	1.1 km	MPC · JPL
708304	2011 YT_{87}	—	June 30, 2014	Haleakala	Pan-STARRS 1	·	1.8 km	MPC · JPL
708305	2011 YD_{89}	—	September 6, 2015	Kitt Peak	Spacewatch	VER	2.0 km	MPC · JPL
708306	2011 YE_{92}	—	December 31, 2011	Mount Lemmon	Mount Lemmon Survey	·	1.5 km	MPC · JPL
708307	2011 YU_{92}	—	December 27, 2011	Kitt Peak	Spacewatch	EOS	1.4 km	MPC · JPL
708308	2011 YD_{93}	—	December 16, 2011	Mount Lemmon	Mount Lemmon Survey	BRA	1.2 km	MPC · JPL
708309	2011 YJ_{93}	—	December 27, 2011	Mount Lemmon	Mount Lemmon Survey	·	1.6 km	MPC · JPL
708310	2011 YO_{93}	—	December 30, 2011	Mount Lemmon	Mount Lemmon Survey	BRA	1.7 km	MPC · JPL
708311	2011 YU_{95}	—	December 25, 2011	Mount Lemmon	Mount Lemmon Survey	·	1.6 km	MPC · JPL
708312	2011 YP_{97}	—	December 29, 2011	Mount Lemmon	Mount Lemmon Survey	L4	5.8 km	MPC · JPL
708313	2012 AT_{4}	—	December 31, 2011	Les Engarouines	L. Bernasconi	·	1.8 km	MPC · JPL
708314	2012 AJ_{9}	—	January 27, 2007	Mount Lemmon	Mount Lemmon Survey	·	1.9 km	MPC · JPL
708315	2012 AM_{9}	—	September 19, 2006	Catalina	CSS	·	1.7 km	MPC · JPL
708316	2012 AL_{15}	—	January 14, 2012	Mount Lemmon	Mount Lemmon Survey	·	1.6 km	MPC · JPL
708317	2012 AN_{20}	—	March 9, 2002	Kitt Peak	Spacewatch	·	590 m	MPC · JPL
708318	2012 AB_{21}	—	February 11, 2005	Gnosca	S. Sposetti	·	1.0 km	MPC · JPL
708319	2012 AT_{24}	—	October 19, 2006	Mount Lemmon	Mount Lemmon Survey	NEM	2.0 km	MPC · JPL
708320	2012 AW_{24}	—	January 14, 2012	Mount Lemmon	Mount Lemmon Survey	·	910 m	MPC · JPL
708321	2012 AT_{25}	—	January 2, 2012	Kitt Peak	Spacewatch	·	1.8 km	MPC · JPL
708322	2012 AW_{25}	—	January 5, 2012	Haleakala	Pan-STARRS 1	·	1.8 km	MPC · JPL
708323	2012 AP_{27}	—	April 20, 2013	Mount Lemmon	Mount Lemmon Survey	·	2.2 km	MPC · JPL
708324	2012 AP_{29}	—	July 19, 2015	Haleakala	Pan-STARRS 1	·	1.6 km	MPC · JPL
708325	2012 AQ_{32}	—	January 4, 2012	Mount Lemmon	Mount Lemmon Survey	·	1.3 km	MPC · JPL
708326	2012 AZ_{36}	—	January 14, 2012	Mount Lemmon	Mount Lemmon Survey	·	1.7 km	MPC · JPL
708327	2012 BN_{2}	—	January 16, 2012	Črni Vrh	Matičič, S.	·	2.4 km	MPC · JPL
708328	2012 BP_{2}	—	March 31, 2009	Kitt Peak	Spacewatch	·	540 m	MPC · JPL
708329	2012 BK_{3}	—	January 1, 2012	Mount Lemmon	Mount Lemmon Survey	EOS	1.9 km	MPC · JPL
708330	2012 BN_{6}	—	November 2, 2010	Mount Lemmon	Mount Lemmon Survey	·	2.2 km	MPC · JPL
708331	2012 BQ_{9}	—	January 18, 2012	Kitt Peak	Spacewatch	·	1.6 km	MPC · JPL
708332	2012 BP_{10}	—	July 30, 2008	Mount Lemmon	Mount Lemmon Survey	TIR	2.6 km	MPC · JPL
708333	2012 BO_{19}	—	April 4, 2002	Kitt Peak	Spacewatch	·	680 m	MPC · JPL
708334	2012 BX_{20}	—	January 19, 2012	Haleakala	Lister, T.	·	2.8 km	MPC · JPL
708335	2012 BU_{26}	—	January 21, 2012	Catalina	CSS	H	480 m	MPC · JPL
708336	2012 BP_{27}	—	January 18, 2012	Kitt Peak	Spacewatch	H	470 m	MPC · JPL
708337	2012 BM_{28}	—	January 24, 2012	Haleakala	Pan-STARRS 1	H	490 m	MPC · JPL
708338	2012 BB_{31}	—	January 3, 2012	Kitt Peak	Spacewatch	·	2.0 km	MPC · JPL
708339	2012 BO_{31}	—	January 20, 2012	Kitt Peak	Spacewatch	·	640 m	MPC · JPL
708340	2012 BE_{32}	—	August 23, 2007	Kitt Peak	Spacewatch	·	680 m	MPC · JPL
708341 Fredjudson	2012 BM_{34}	Fredjudson	November 22, 2006	Mauna Kea	D. D. Balam, K. M. Perrett	·	2.1 km	MPC · JPL
708342	2012 BV_{37}	—	August 22, 2003	Palomar	NEAT	·	1.1 km	MPC · JPL
708343	2012 BV_{40}	—	January 28, 2007	Mount Lemmon	Mount Lemmon Survey	·	2.1 km	MPC · JPL
708344	2012 BR_{41}	—	February 10, 2007	Catalina	CSS	·	2.0 km	MPC · JPL
708345	2012 BG_{46}	—	March 31, 2009	Mount Lemmon	Mount Lemmon Survey	·	680 m	MPC · JPL
708346	2012 BO_{46}	—	January 19, 2012	Mount Lemmon	Mount Lemmon Survey	·	500 m	MPC · JPL
708347	2012 BC_{50}	—	October 2, 2010	Kitt Peak	Spacewatch	·	1.5 km	MPC · JPL
708348	2012 BF_{57}	—	January 24, 2012	Haleakala	Pan-STARRS 1	H	540 m	MPC · JPL
708349	2012 BO_{59}	—	March 2, 2008	Mount Lemmon	Mount Lemmon Survey	WIT	910 m	MPC · JPL
708350	2012 BK_{62}	—	January 20, 2012	Mount Lemmon	Mount Lemmon Survey	·	1.7 km	MPC · JPL
708351	2012 BM_{62}	—	January 20, 2012	Mount Lemmon	Mount Lemmon Survey	KOR	970 m	MPC · JPL
708352	2012 BK_{63}	—	January 20, 2012	Mount Lemmon	Mount Lemmon Survey	AGN	940 m	MPC · JPL
708353	2012 BE_{64}	—	January 20, 2012	Mount Lemmon	Mount Lemmon Survey	·	1.9 km	MPC · JPL
708354	2012 BU_{64}	—	October 1, 2005	Mount Lemmon	Mount Lemmon Survey	·	2.1 km	MPC · JPL
708355	2012 BR_{66}	—	September 3, 2010	Mount Lemmon	Mount Lemmon Survey	·	1.9 km	MPC · JPL
708356	2012 BX_{67}	—	September 26, 2000	Kitt Peak	Spacewatch	·	590 m	MPC · JPL
708357	2012 BR_{69}	—	October 23, 2003	Kitt Peak	Spacewatch	NYS	850 m	MPC · JPL
708358	2012 BD_{78}	—	January 21, 2012	Kitt Peak	Spacewatch	·	2.4 km	MPC · JPL
708359	2012 BZ_{78}	—	January 25, 2012	Haleakala	Pan-STARRS 1	EOS	1.3 km	MPC · JPL
708360	2012 BB_{82}	—	January 27, 2012	Mount Lemmon	Mount Lemmon Survey	·	1.6 km	MPC · JPL
708361	2012 BZ_{82}	—	January 27, 2012	Mount Lemmon	Mount Lemmon Survey	·	1.3 km	MPC · JPL
708362	2012 BJ_{83}	—	May 27, 2009	Mount Lemmon	Mount Lemmon Survey	NYS	880 m	MPC · JPL
708363	2012 BO_{85}	—	September 15, 2009	Mount Lemmon	Mount Lemmon Survey	·	3.4 km	MPC · JPL
708364	2012 BG_{87}	—	November 5, 2007	Catalina	CSS	·	910 m	MPC · JPL
708365	2012 BQ_{89}	—	December 28, 2011	Kitt Peak	Spacewatch	·	2.2 km	MPC · JPL
708366	2012 BW_{93}	—	October 6, 2005	Cordell-Lorenz	D. T. Durig	H	520 m	MPC · JPL
708367	2012 BQ_{94}	—	July 19, 2006	Mauna Kea	P. A. Wiegert, D. Subasinghe	·	910 m	MPC · JPL
708368	2012 BZ_{97}	—	December 27, 2011	Catalina	CSS	PHO	1.1 km	MPC · JPL
708369	2012 BW_{99}	—	January 27, 2012	Mount Lemmon	Mount Lemmon Survey	·	1.8 km	MPC · JPL
708370	2012 BV_{105}	—	January 24, 2012	Haleakala	Pan-STARRS 1	·	2.1 km	MPC · JPL
708371	2012 BF_{106}	—	January 25, 2012	Haleakala	Pan-STARRS 1	·	1.8 km	MPC · JPL
708372	2012 BE_{109}	—	January 19, 2012	Kitt Peak	Spacewatch	EOS	1.7 km	MPC · JPL
708373	2012 BY_{115}	—	February 29, 2008	Kitt Peak	Spacewatch	·	1.5 km	MPC · JPL
708374	2012 BR_{116}	—	October 9, 2010	Mount Lemmon	Mount Lemmon Survey	KOR	1.0 km	MPC · JPL
708375	2012 BZ_{116}	—	January 20, 2012	Kitt Peak	Spacewatch	EOS	1.6 km	MPC · JPL
708376	2012 BQ_{117}	—	January 10, 2007	Mount Lemmon	Mount Lemmon Survey	·	1.6 km	MPC · JPL
708377	2012 BJ_{123}	—	January 2, 2012	Mount Lemmon	Mount Lemmon Survey	·	3.0 km	MPC · JPL
708378	2012 BN_{126}	—	January 1, 2008	Kanab	Sheridan, E.	·	770 m	MPC · JPL
708379	2012 BU_{127}	—	January 25, 2012	Haleakala	Pan-STARRS 1	·	650 m	MPC · JPL
708380	2012 BX_{133}	—	January 21, 2012	Catalina	CSS	H	560 m	MPC · JPL
708381	2012 BE_{138}	—	April 1, 2009	Mount Lemmon	Mount Lemmon Survey	NYS	860 m	MPC · JPL
708382	2012 BN_{138}	—	January 27, 2012	Kitt Peak	Spacewatch	·	1.9 km	MPC · JPL
708383	2012 BO_{139}	—	January 29, 2012	Haleakala	Pan-STARRS 1	PHO	1.0 km	MPC · JPL
708384	2012 BZ_{139}	—	February 25, 2007	Kitt Peak	Spacewatch	·	2.7 km	MPC · JPL
708385	2012 BC_{143}	—	January 24, 2012	Haleakala	Pan-STARRS 1	·	1.1 km	MPC · JPL
708386	2012 BO_{144}	—	December 21, 2006	Kitt Peak	L. H. Wasserman, M. W. Buie	KOR	1.2 km	MPC · JPL
708387	2012 BT_{145}	—	January 27, 2012	Mount Lemmon	Mount Lemmon Survey	·	770 m	MPC · JPL
708388	2012 BW_{146}	—	May 26, 2009	Catalina	CSS	·	1.3 km	MPC · JPL
708389	2012 BM_{153}	—	February 10, 2007	Mount Lemmon	Mount Lemmon Survey	·	2.7 km	MPC · JPL
708390	2012 BH_{155}	—	April 4, 2014	Haleakala	Pan-STARRS 1	L4	5.9 km	MPC · JPL
708391	2012 BU_{155}	—	January 26, 2012	Mount Lemmon	Mount Lemmon Survey	L4	6.4 km	MPC · JPL
708392	2012 BJ_{157}	—	January 19, 2012	Haleakala	Pan-STARRS 1	KOR	1.1 km	MPC · JPL
708393	2012 BV_{157}	—	January 19, 2012	Haleakala	Pan-STARRS 1	·	1.2 km	MPC · JPL
708394	2012 BY_{157}	—	January 19, 2012	Haleakala	Pan-STARRS 1	·	740 m	MPC · JPL
708395	2012 BH_{158}	—	January 19, 2012	Haleakala	Pan-STARRS 1	PHO	680 m	MPC · JPL
708396	2012 BA_{159}	—	March 9, 2007	Mount Lemmon	Mount Lemmon Survey	·	1.3 km	MPC · JPL
708397	2012 BV_{159}	—	August 24, 2007	Kitt Peak	Spacewatch	·	560 m	MPC · JPL
708398	2012 BM_{161}	—	January 25, 2012	Haleakala	Pan-STARRS 1	·	2.2 km	MPC · JPL
708399	2012 BS_{161}	—	June 3, 2013	Mount Lemmon	Mount Lemmon Survey	·	1.9 km	MPC · JPL
708400	2012 BF_{162}	—	April 7, 2013	Kitt Peak	Spacewatch	V	530 m	MPC · JPL

== 708401–708500 ==
back to top

Designation			Discovery			Properties		Ref
Permanent	Provisional	Named after	Date	Site	Discoverer(s)	Category	Diam.	Ref
708401	2012 BM_{162}	—	January 19, 2012	Haleakala	Pan-STARRS 1	·	1.0 km	MPC · JPL
708402	2012 BN_{164}	—	October 29, 2016	Mount Lemmon	Mount Lemmon Survey	·	2.5 km	MPC · JPL
708403	2012 BL_{166}	—	August 25, 2014	Haleakala	Pan-STARRS 1	(18466)	2.2 km	MPC · JPL
708404	2012 BN_{166}	—	January 21, 2012	Mount Lemmon	Mount Lemmon Survey	·	1.7 km	MPC · JPL
708405	2012 BC_{167}	—	January 29, 2012	Kitt Peak	Spacewatch	·	1.8 km	MPC · JPL
708406	2012 BD_{167}	—	January 18, 2012	Mount Lemmon	Mount Lemmon Survey	·	1.9 km	MPC · JPL
708407	2012 BX_{168}	—	January 19, 2012	Haleakala	Pan-STARRS 1	·	2.3 km	MPC · JPL
708408	2012 BB_{169}	—	January 19, 2012	Haleakala	Pan-STARRS 1	·	2.4 km	MPC · JPL
708409	2012 BC_{171}	—	March 19, 2018	Mount Lemmon	Mount Lemmon Survey	·	2.2 km	MPC · JPL
708410	2012 BS_{171}	—	January 19, 2012	Haleakala	Pan-STARRS 1	EOS	1.3 km	MPC · JPL
708411	2012 BR_{173}	—	January 30, 2012	Kitt Peak	Spacewatch	·	2.1 km	MPC · JPL
708412	2012 BV_{173}	—	January 19, 2012	Haleakala	Pan-STARRS 1	·	1.6 km	MPC · JPL
708413	2012 BN_{174}	—	January 18, 2012	Les Engarouines	L. Bernasconi	·	670 m	MPC · JPL
708414	2012 BP_{174}	—	January 21, 2012	Kitt Peak	Spacewatch	EOS	1.4 km	MPC · JPL
708415	2012 BV_{176}	—	January 19, 2012	Haleakala	Pan-STARRS 1	·	2.6 km	MPC · JPL
708416	2012 BW_{176}	—	January 19, 2012	Haleakala	Pan-STARRS 1	·	2.3 km	MPC · JPL
708417	2012 BF_{177}	—	January 30, 2012	Kitt Peak	Spacewatch	·	860 m	MPC · JPL
708418	2012 BS_{179}	—	January 20, 2012	Haleakala	Pan-STARRS 1	URS	3.0 km	MPC · JPL
708419	2012 BN_{188}	—	January 19, 2012	Haleakala	Pan-STARRS 1	·	840 m	MPC · JPL
708420	2012 BA_{191}	—	January 20, 2012	Haleakala	Pan-STARRS 1	·	1.7 km	MPC · JPL
708421	2012 CU_{5}	—	January 20, 2012	Kitt Peak	Spacewatch	V	540 m	MPC · JPL
708422	2012 CJ_{6}	—	February 3, 2012	Mount Lemmon	Mount Lemmon Survey	·	2.3 km	MPC · JPL
708423	2012 CY_{6}	—	March 14, 2007	Kitt Peak	Spacewatch	·	1.6 km	MPC · JPL
708424	2012 CL_{7}	—	July 27, 2009	Kitt Peak	Spacewatch	·	2.3 km	MPC · JPL
708425	2012 CJ_{8}	—	January 26, 2012	Mount Lemmon	Mount Lemmon Survey	·	1.5 km	MPC · JPL
708426	2012 CS_{8}	—	February 3, 2012	Haleakala	Pan-STARRS 1	EOS	1.4 km	MPC · JPL
708427	2012 CD_{10}	—	February 3, 2012	Haleakala	Pan-STARRS 1	·	600 m	MPC · JPL
708428	2012 CO_{10}	—	November 20, 2003	Apache Point	SDSS Collaboration	·	1.1 km	MPC · JPL
708429	2012 CL_{12}	—	May 23, 2009	Catalina	CSS	PHO	930 m	MPC · JPL
708430	2012 CA_{24}	—	January 26, 2012	Kitt Peak	Spacewatch	·	2.3 km	MPC · JPL
708431	2012 CJ_{27}	—	November 8, 2007	Kitt Peak	Spacewatch	·	740 m	MPC · JPL
708432	2012 CW_{28}	—	November 7, 2007	Kitt Peak	Spacewatch	·	850 m	MPC · JPL
708433	2012 CG_{46}	—	April 14, 2008	Kitt Peak	Spacewatch	·	2.0 km	MPC · JPL
708434	2012 CQ_{49}	—	November 17, 2006	Mount Lemmon	Mount Lemmon Survey	·	1.8 km	MPC · JPL
708435	2012 CA_{52}	—	January 19, 2012	Haleakala	Pan-STARRS 1	·	1.9 km	MPC · JPL
708436	2012 CE_{54}	—	August 31, 2005	Kitt Peak	Spacewatch	H	560 m	MPC · JPL
708437	2012 CP_{55}	—	February 1, 2012	Kitt Peak	Spacewatch	·	2.2 km	MPC · JPL
708438	2012 CS_{55}	—	February 1, 2012	Kitt Peak	Spacewatch	MAS	530 m	MPC · JPL
708439	2012 CJ_{58}	—	February 1, 2012	Kitt Peak	Spacewatch	NYS	1.1 km	MPC · JPL
708440	2012 CV_{58}	—	July 28, 2008	Siding Spring	SSS	·	2.9 km	MPC · JPL
708441	2012 CZ_{59}	—	April 10, 2013	Mount Lemmon	Mount Lemmon Survey	·	3.4 km	MPC · JPL
708442	2012 CE_{61}	—	February 1, 2012	Kitt Peak	Spacewatch	·	2.3 km	MPC · JPL
708443	2012 CZ_{62}	—	October 1, 2014	Haleakala	Pan-STARRS 1	·	2.0 km	MPC · JPL
708444	2012 CP_{64}	—	February 3, 2012	Mount Lemmon	Mount Lemmon Survey	·	2.4 km	MPC · JPL
708445	2012 CW_{64}	—	August 22, 2014	Haleakala	Pan-STARRS 1	·	1.6 km	MPC · JPL
708446	2012 CY_{65}	—	February 1, 2012	Kitt Peak	Spacewatch	·	2.2 km	MPC · JPL
708447	2012 CK_{68}	—	February 15, 2012	Haleakala	Pan-STARRS 1	·	2.5 km	MPC · JPL
708448	2012 CB_{69}	—	February 14, 2012	Haleakala	Pan-STARRS 1	·	1.3 km	MPC · JPL
708449	2012 CV_{69}	—	October 14, 2010	Mount Lemmon	Mount Lemmon Survey	·	1.8 km	MPC · JPL
708450	2012 CL_{70}	—	February 1, 2012	Kitt Peak	Spacewatch	·	2.0 km	MPC · JPL
708451	2012 DN_{2}	—	September 19, 2009	Mount Lemmon	Mount Lemmon Survey	·	1.7 km	MPC · JPL
708452	2012 DR_{2}	—	February 21, 2007	Kitt Peak	Spacewatch	·	1.7 km	MPC · JPL
708453	2012 DD_{7}	—	February 3, 2012	Haleakala	Pan-STARRS 1	EOS	1.5 km	MPC · JPL
708454	2012 DK_{11}	—	January 27, 2012	Mount Lemmon	Mount Lemmon Survey	·	2.6 km	MPC · JPL
708455	2012 DH_{13}	—	February 19, 2012	Catalina	CSS	·	2.5 km	MPC · JPL
708456	2012 DY_{25}	—	March 26, 2003	Palomar	NEAT	·	1.5 km	MPC · JPL
708457	2012 DD_{26}	—	February 3, 2012	Haleakala	Pan-STARRS 1	·	1.5 km	MPC · JPL
708458	2012 DK_{30}	—	February 24, 2012	Vallemare Borbona	V. S. Casulli	·	2.7 km	MPC · JPL
708459	2012 DF_{34}	—	January 19, 2012	Haleakala	Pan-STARRS 1	·	790 m	MPC · JPL
708460	2012 DW_{35}	—	February 24, 2012	Kitt Peak	Spacewatch	·	1.8 km	MPC · JPL
708461	2012 DE_{36}	—	August 20, 2004	Kitt Peak	Spacewatch	H	580 m	MPC · JPL
708462	2012 DX_{36}	—	January 19, 2012	Haleakala	Pan-STARRS 1	·	2.2 km	MPC · JPL
708463	2012 DM_{37}	—	February 14, 2012	Haleakala	Pan-STARRS 1	·	1.9 km	MPC · JPL
708464	2012 DV_{37}	—	March 4, 2005	Kitt Peak	Spacewatch	·	740 m	MPC · JPL
708465	2012 DL_{39}	—	November 11, 2010	Mount Lemmon	Mount Lemmon Survey	·	2.3 km	MPC · JPL
708466	2012 DM_{40}	—	February 21, 2012	Kitt Peak	Spacewatch	·	2.5 km	MPC · JPL
708467	2012 DX_{40}	—	February 21, 2007	Kitt Peak	Spacewatch	KOR	1.1 km	MPC · JPL
708468	2012 DQ_{41}	—	August 16, 2009	Kitt Peak	Spacewatch	EOS	1.5 km	MPC · JPL
708469	2012 DR_{43}	—	February 16, 2012	Haleakala	Pan-STARRS 1	·	1.2 km	MPC · JPL
708470	2012 DD_{50}	—	February 27, 2008	Eskridge	G. Hug	·	920 m	MPC · JPL
708471	2012 DX_{50}	—	February 26, 2012	Mount Lemmon	Mount Lemmon Survey	·	940 m	MPC · JPL
708472	2012 DE_{55}	—	May 10, 2005	Kitt Peak	Spacewatch	·	940 m	MPC · JPL
708473	2012 DJ_{56}	—	January 19, 2012	Haleakala	Pan-STARRS 1	·	1.1 km	MPC · JPL
708474	2012 DM_{63}	—	February 3, 2012	Haleakala	Pan-STARRS 1	·	860 m	MPC · JPL
708475	2012 DJ_{65}	—	September 16, 2003	Kitt Peak	Spacewatch	·	2.7 km	MPC · JPL
708476	2012 DE_{66}	—	February 1, 2012	Kitt Peak	Spacewatch	·	2.8 km	MPC · JPL
708477	2012 DL_{72}	—	January 19, 2012	Haleakala	Pan-STARRS 1	·	2.4 km	MPC · JPL
708478	2012 DQ_{72}	—	January 19, 2012	Haleakala	Pan-STARRS 1	EOS	1.4 km	MPC · JPL
708479	2012 DE_{76}	—	February 26, 2012	Mayhill-ISON	L. Elenin	·	2.6 km	MPC · JPL
708480	2012 DM_{76}	—	February 21, 2012	Mount Lemmon	Mount Lemmon Survey	LIX	3.1 km	MPC · JPL
708481	2012 DA_{83}	—	January 29, 2006	Bergisch Gladbach	W. Bickel	·	2.4 km	MPC · JPL
708482	2012 DM_{83}	—	February 23, 2012	Mount Lemmon	Mount Lemmon Survey	·	2.3 km	MPC · JPL
708483	2012 DO_{85}	—	February 25, 2012	Kitt Peak	Spacewatch	·	800 m	MPC · JPL
708484	2012 DF_{94}	—	October 8, 2007	Mount Lemmon	Mount Lemmon Survey	·	620 m	MPC · JPL
708485	2012 DG_{97}	—	November 2, 2010	Mount Lemmon	Mount Lemmon Survey	·	2.6 km	MPC · JPL
708486	2012 DC_{98}	—	February 23, 2012	La Sagra	OAM	T_{j} (2.98)	3.0 km	MPC · JPL
708487	2012 DV_{99}	—	January 23, 2006	Kitt Peak	Spacewatch	·	2.7 km	MPC · JPL
708488	2012 DO_{100}	—	September 22, 2009	Mount Lemmon	Mount Lemmon Survey	EOS	1.7 km	MPC · JPL
708489	2012 DV_{100}	—	February 9, 2008	Mount Lemmon	Mount Lemmon Survey	V	460 m	MPC · JPL
708490	2012 DV_{101}	—	February 27, 2012	Haleakala	Pan-STARRS 1	KOR	1.0 km	MPC · JPL
708491	2012 DC_{102}	—	February 19, 2012	Kitt Peak	Spacewatch	·	2.4 km	MPC · JPL
708492	2012 DX_{102}	—	February 25, 2012	Kitt Peak	Spacewatch	·	2.4 km	MPC · JPL
708493	2012 DT_{103}	—	February 27, 2012	Kitt Peak	Spacewatch	·	2.3 km	MPC · JPL
708494	2012 DY_{103}	—	October 22, 2005	Kitt Peak	Spacewatch	·	1.8 km	MPC · JPL
708495	2012 DK_{104}	—	February 27, 2012	Haleakala	Pan-STARRS 1	·	930 m	MPC · JPL
708496	2012 DN_{104}	—	February 27, 2012	Haleakala	Pan-STARRS 1	·	1.8 km	MPC · JPL
708497	2012 DU_{104}	—	December 21, 2006	Kitt Peak	L. H. Wasserman, M. W. Buie	·	1.5 km	MPC · JPL
708498	2012 DV_{104}	—	February 27, 2012	Haleakala	Pan-STARRS 1	THM	1.8 km	MPC · JPL
708499	2012 DE_{106}	—	February 20, 2012	Haleakala	Pan-STARRS 1	·	2.5 km	MPC · JPL
708500	2012 DL_{106}	—	February 20, 2012	Haleakala	Pan-STARRS 1	·	2.6 km	MPC · JPL

== 708501–708600 ==
back to top

Designation			Discovery			Properties		Ref
Permanent	Provisional	Named after	Date	Site	Discoverer(s)	Category	Diam.	Ref
708501	2012 DV_{106}	—	February 24, 2012	Kitt Peak	Spacewatch	EOS	1.8 km	MPC · JPL
708502	2012 DC_{107}	—	December 10, 2014	Mount Lemmon	Mount Lemmon Survey	V	680 m	MPC · JPL
708503	2012 DK_{108}	—	February 28, 2012	Haleakala	Pan-STARRS 1	·	1.8 km	MPC · JPL
708504	2012 DO_{109}	—	February 27, 2012	Haleakala	Pan-STARRS 1	·	1.9 km	MPC · JPL
708505	2012 DV_{109}	—	September 2, 2014	Haleakala	Pan-STARRS 1	·	2.2 km	MPC · JPL
708506	2012 DZ_{109}	—	February 28, 2012	Haleakala	Pan-STARRS 1	·	1.9 km	MPC · JPL
708507	2012 DO_{111}	—	April 11, 2005	Mount Lemmon	Mount Lemmon Survey	·	850 m	MPC · JPL
708508	2012 DT_{111}	—	February 26, 2012	Haleakala	Pan-STARRS 1	EOS	1.7 km	MPC · JPL
708509	2012 DX_{111}	—	January 27, 2017	Haleakala	Pan-STARRS 1	·	1.8 km	MPC · JPL
708510	2012 DC_{114}	—	September 24, 2014	Mount Lemmon	Mount Lemmon Survey	·	1.7 km	MPC · JPL
708511	2012 DK_{114}	—	April 12, 2018	Mount Lemmon	Mount Lemmon Survey	·	2.0 km	MPC · JPL
708512	2012 DT_{115}	—	February 16, 2012	Haleakala	Pan-STARRS 1	·	2.4 km	MPC · JPL
708513	2012 DJ_{116}	—	February 28, 2012	Haleakala	Pan-STARRS 1	VER	2.4 km	MPC · JPL
708514	2012 DC_{117}	—	February 27, 2012	Haleakala	Pan-STARRS 1	·	1.3 km	MPC · JPL
708515	2012 DZ_{118}	—	February 28, 2012	Haleakala	Pan-STARRS 1	NYS	950 m	MPC · JPL
708516	2012 DP_{119}	—	February 28, 2012	Haleakala	Pan-STARRS 1	MAS	540 m	MPC · JPL
708517	2012 DS_{119}	—	February 28, 2012	Haleakala	Pan-STARRS 1	·	2.0 km	MPC · JPL
708518	2012 DM_{120}	—	February 23, 2012	Mount Lemmon	Mount Lemmon Survey	·	1.7 km	MPC · JPL
708519	2012 DZ_{120}	—	February 27, 2012	Haleakala	Pan-STARRS 1	·	2.5 km	MPC · JPL
708520	2012 DG_{121}	—	February 26, 2012	Haleakala	Pan-STARRS 1	·	2.1 km	MPC · JPL
708521	2012 DP_{121}	—	February 29, 2012	Mount Graham	Boyle, R. P., V. Laugalys	EOS	1.4 km	MPC · JPL
708522	2012 DK_{126}	—	February 25, 2012	Mount Lemmon	Mount Lemmon Survey	·	820 m	MPC · JPL
708523	2012 DG_{127}	—	February 28, 2012	Haleakala	Pan-STARRS 1	THM	1.6 km	MPC · JPL
708524	2012 DG_{129}	—	February 23, 2012	Mount Lemmon	Mount Lemmon Survey	·	1.8 km	MPC · JPL
708525	2012 DW_{131}	—	February 27, 2012	Haleakala	Pan-STARRS 1	·	2.0 km	MPC · JPL
708526	2012 DC_{132}	—	February 28, 2012	Haleakala	Pan-STARRS 1	·	1.7 km	MPC · JPL
708527	2012 DW_{133}	—	February 23, 2012	Mount Lemmon	Mount Lemmon Survey	·	1.4 km	MPC · JPL
708528	2012 EX_{1}	—	March 2, 2012	Oukaïmeden	C. Rinner	THB	3.2 km	MPC · JPL
708529	2012 ET_{3}	—	March 1, 2012	Mount Lemmon	Mount Lemmon Survey	·	620 m	MPC · JPL
708530	2012 EG_{6}	—	December 25, 2011	Mount Lemmon	Mount Lemmon Survey	·	3.0 km	MPC · JPL
708531	2012 EP_{9}	—	April 11, 2002	Kitt Peak	Spacewatch	H	370 m	MPC · JPL
708532	2012 EL_{15}	—	March 13, 2012	Mount Lemmon	Mount Lemmon Survey	·	2.9 km	MPC · JPL
708533	2012 EN_{15}	—	January 19, 2012	Haleakala	Pan-STARRS 1	EOS	1.3 km	MPC · JPL
708534	2012 EA_{17}	—	March 13, 2012	Palomar	Palomar Transient Factory	·	2.0 km	MPC · JPL
708535	2012 EB_{18}	—	February 26, 2012	Haleakala	Pan-STARRS 1	THM	1.6 km	MPC · JPL
708536	2012 EU_{19}	—	March 14, 2012	Mount Lemmon	Mount Lemmon Survey	·	1.7 km	MPC · JPL
708537	2012 ED_{20}	—	March 13, 2012	Mount Lemmon	Mount Lemmon Survey	·	1.9 km	MPC · JPL
708538	2012 EQ_{23}	—	March 15, 2012	Mount Lemmon	Mount Lemmon Survey	·	1.9 km	MPC · JPL
708539	2012 ER_{23}	—	August 28, 2014	Haleakala	Pan-STARRS 1	VER	1.9 km	MPC · JPL
708540	2012 EE_{24}	—	March 15, 2012	Mayhill-ISON	L. Elenin	·	2.1 km	MPC · JPL
708541	2012 EG_{24}	—	July 30, 2014	Haleakala	Pan-STARRS 1	·	2.2 km	MPC · JPL
708542	2012 EW_{24}	—	March 15, 2012	Mount Lemmon	Mount Lemmon Survey	·	1.8 km	MPC · JPL
708543	2012 EB_{25}	—	March 13, 2012	Mount Lemmon	Mount Lemmon Survey	·	660 m	MPC · JPL
708544	2012 EY_{27}	—	March 13, 2012	Haleakala	Pan-STARRS 1	·	2.7 km	MPC · JPL
708545	2012 EO_{28}	—	March 13, 2012	Mount Lemmon	Mount Lemmon Survey	·	2.2 km	MPC · JPL
708546	2012 EC_{30}	—	March 14, 2012	Kitt Peak	Spacewatch	NYS	930 m	MPC · JPL
708547	2012 EK_{31}	—	March 13, 2012	Haleakala	Pan-STARRS 1	·	2.1 km	MPC · JPL
708548	2012 ER_{31}	—	March 13, 2012	Mount Lemmon	Mount Lemmon Survey	·	1.4 km	MPC · JPL
708549	2012 EY_{31}	—	March 13, 2012	Mount Lemmon	Mount Lemmon Survey	·	2.2 km	MPC · JPL
708550	2012 ES_{33}	—	March 14, 2012	Mount Lemmon	Mount Lemmon Survey	EOS	1.5 km	MPC · JPL
708551	2012 ED_{34}	—	March 15, 2012	Mount Lemmon	Mount Lemmon Survey	·	1.6 km	MPC · JPL
708552	2012 FT_{3}	—	March 16, 2012	Haleakala	Pan-STARRS 1	·	2.5 km	MPC · JPL
708553	2012 FY_{5}	—	January 19, 2012	Mount Lemmon	Mount Lemmon Survey	·	2.3 km	MPC · JPL
708554	2012 FJ_{9}	—	March 9, 2007	Mount Lemmon	Mount Lemmon Survey	·	1.5 km	MPC · JPL
708555	2012 FU_{9}	—	September 19, 2010	Mount Lemmon	Mount Lemmon Survey	·	640 m	MPC · JPL
708556	2012 FG_{16}	—	September 7, 2008	Mount Lemmon	Mount Lemmon Survey	·	2.4 km	MPC · JPL
708557	2012 FM_{16}	—	March 17, 2012	Mount Lemmon	Mount Lemmon Survey	EOS	1.3 km	MPC · JPL
708558	2012 FS_{16}	—	December 1, 2005	Mount Lemmon	Mount Lemmon Survey	KOR	1.1 km	MPC · JPL
708559	2012 FL_{17}	—	December 27, 2005	Mount Lemmon	Mount Lemmon Survey	·	1.5 km	MPC · JPL
708560	2012 FU_{20}	—	March 17, 2012	Mount Lemmon	Mount Lemmon Survey	·	2.3 km	MPC · JPL
708561	2012 FT_{21}	—	March 17, 2012	Mount Lemmon	Mount Lemmon Survey	·	1.5 km	MPC · JPL
708562	2012 FL_{26}	—	February 26, 2012	Kitt Peak	Spacewatch	·	1.0 km	MPC · JPL
708563	2012 FW_{26}	—	February 1, 2006	Mount Lemmon	Mount Lemmon Survey	·	2.0 km	MPC · JPL
708564	2012 FU_{28}	—	February 26, 2012	Haleakala	Pan-STARRS 1	·	2.1 km	MPC · JPL
708565	2012 FM_{30}	—	August 26, 2003	Cerro Tololo	Deep Ecliptic Survey	·	700 m	MPC · JPL
708566	2012 FV_{30}	—	September 1, 2010	Mount Lemmon	Mount Lemmon Survey	H	480 m	MPC · JPL
708567	2012 FX_{30}	—	March 16, 2001	Kitt Peak	Spacewatch	·	1.1 km	MPC · JPL
708568	2012 FM_{32}	—	February 4, 2006	Kitt Peak	Spacewatch	VER	2.0 km	MPC · JPL
708569	2012 FM_{33}	—	September 5, 2008	Kitt Peak	Spacewatch	·	2.5 km	MPC · JPL
708570	2012 FX_{36}	—	March 24, 2012	Mount Lemmon	Mount Lemmon Survey	·	1.9 km	MPC · JPL
708571	2012 FD_{38}	—	March 25, 2012	Mount Lemmon	Mount Lemmon Survey	·	2.1 km	MPC · JPL
708572	2012 FF_{40}	—	September 5, 2008	Kitt Peak	Spacewatch	·	2.7 km	MPC · JPL
708573	2012 FF_{45}	—	February 8, 2008	Kitt Peak	Spacewatch	·	810 m	MPC · JPL
708574	2012 FS_{45}	—	September 25, 2009	Kitt Peak	Spacewatch	·	2.3 km	MPC · JPL
708575	2012 FV_{45}	—	March 16, 2012	Mount Lemmon	Mount Lemmon Survey	·	1.8 km	MPC · JPL
708576	2012 FN_{48}	—	March 23, 2012	Mount Lemmon	Mount Lemmon Survey	·	2.4 km	MPC · JPL
708577	2012 FK_{49}	—	February 28, 2012	Haleakala	Pan-STARRS 1	EOS	1.5 km	MPC · JPL
708578	2012 FQ_{50}	—	March 24, 2012	Mount Lemmon	Mount Lemmon Survey	·	2.1 km	MPC · JPL
708579	2012 FE_{51}	—	July 29, 2008	Mount Lemmon	Mount Lemmon Survey	·	1.8 km	MPC · JPL
708580	2012 FA_{52}	—	April 8, 2002	Palomar	NEAT	·	720 m	MPC · JPL
708581	2012 FF_{53}	—	November 14, 2002	Palomar	NEAT	H	660 m	MPC · JPL
708582	2012 FM_{53}	—	February 27, 2012	Haleakala	Pan-STARRS 1	·	3.0 km	MPC · JPL
708583	2012 FB_{56}	—	March 25, 2012	Mount Lemmon	Mount Lemmon Survey	EOS	1.9 km	MPC · JPL
708584	2012 FJ_{71}	—	March 16, 2012	Mount Lemmon	Mount Lemmon Survey	·	2.9 km	MPC · JPL
708585	2012 FJ_{74}	—	March 24, 2012	Kitt Peak	Spacewatch	MAS	690 m	MPC · JPL
708586	2012 FB_{77}	—	February 20, 2012	Kitt Peak	Spacewatch	·	2.5 km	MPC · JPL
708587	2012 FD_{77}	—	February 26, 2012	Mount Lemmon	Mount Lemmon Survey	·	2.5 km	MPC · JPL
708588	2012 FQ_{78}	—	March 25, 2012	Catalina	CSS	T_{j} (2.96)	3.3 km	MPC · JPL
708589	2012 FM_{79}	—	February 7, 2006	Mount Lemmon	Mount Lemmon Survey	·	2.4 km	MPC · JPL
708590	2012 FG_{80}	—	February 2, 2008	Kitt Peak	Spacewatch	·	900 m	MPC · JPL
708591	2012 FA_{81}	—	June 8, 2007	Kitt Peak	Spacewatch	·	2.8 km	MPC · JPL
708592	2012 FO_{84}	—	February 10, 2011	Mount Lemmon	Mount Lemmon Survey	·	2.2 km	MPC · JPL
708593	2012 FD_{85}	—	April 19, 2007	Mount Lemmon	Mount Lemmon Survey	·	2.0 km	MPC · JPL
708594	2012 FN_{85}	—	March 29, 2012	Haleakala	Pan-STARRS 1	EUN	950 m	MPC · JPL
708595	2012 FE_{87}	—	February 4, 2006	Kitt Peak	Spacewatch	·	2.6 km	MPC · JPL
708596	2012 FL_{87}	—	March 31, 2012	Haleakala	Pan-STARRS 1	LIX	3.2 km	MPC · JPL
708597	2012 FT_{87}	—	October 10, 2015	Haleakala	Pan-STARRS 1	·	2.7 km	MPC · JPL
708598	2012 FV_{87}	—	August 20, 2014	Haleakala	Pan-STARRS 1	·	2.3 km	MPC · JPL
708599	2012 FB_{88}	—	December 5, 2005	Mount Lemmon	Mount Lemmon Survey	·	1.4 km	MPC · JPL
708600	2012 FC_{88}	—	March 17, 2012	Mount Lemmon	Mount Lemmon Survey	NYS	1.0 km	MPC · JPL

== 708601–708700 ==
back to top

Designation			Discovery			Properties		Ref
Permanent	Provisional	Named after	Date	Site	Discoverer(s)	Category	Diam.	Ref
708601	2012 FD_{88}	—	December 14, 2015	Haleakala	Pan-STARRS 1	·	1.8 km	MPC · JPL
708602	2012 FT_{88}	—	August 28, 2014	Haleakala	Pan-STARRS 1	·	2.4 km	MPC · JPL
708603	2012 FX_{88}	—	August 31, 2014	Haleakala	Pan-STARRS 1	EOS	1.5 km	MPC · JPL
708604	2012 FY_{88}	—	August 29, 2014	Mount Lemmon	Mount Lemmon Survey	·	1.9 km	MPC · JPL
708605	2012 FM_{90}	—	November 15, 2015	Haleakala	Pan-STARRS 1	·	2.4 km	MPC · JPL
708606	2012 FE_{93}	—	September 19, 2014	Haleakala	Pan-STARRS 1	·	1.9 km	MPC · JPL
708607	2012 FG_{93}	—	August 15, 2013	Haleakala	Pan-STARRS 1	·	2.3 km	MPC · JPL
708608	2012 FK_{93}	—	March 29, 2012	Haleakala	Pan-STARRS 1	·	2.9 km	MPC · JPL
708609	2012 FX_{93}	—	September 15, 2014	Mount Lemmon	Mount Lemmon Survey	·	1.9 km	MPC · JPL
708610	2012 FQ_{96}	—	March 7, 2016	Haleakala	Pan-STARRS 1	·	990 m	MPC · JPL
708611	2012 FZ_{96}	—	August 23, 2014	Haleakala	Pan-STARRS 1	·	2.6 km	MPC · JPL
708612	2012 FK_{97}	—	March 16, 2012	Mount Lemmon	Mount Lemmon Survey	·	810 m	MPC · JPL
708613	2012 FT_{97}	—	March 30, 2012	Mount Lemmon	Mount Lemmon Survey	·	1.4 km	MPC · JPL
708614	2012 FX_{97}	—	September 9, 2013	Haleakala	Pan-STARRS 1	MAS	620 m	MPC · JPL
708615	2012 FC_{98}	—	August 28, 2014	Haleakala	Pan-STARRS 1	·	2.1 km	MPC · JPL
708616	2012 FV_{98}	—	March 24, 2012	Mount Lemmon	Mount Lemmon Survey	·	1.9 km	MPC · JPL
708617	2012 FW_{99}	—	March 16, 2012	Mount Lemmon	Mount Lemmon Survey	·	670 m	MPC · JPL
708618	2012 FT_{100}	—	March 23, 2012	Mount Lemmon	Mount Lemmon Survey	·	850 m	MPC · JPL
708619	2012 FF_{101}	—	March 25, 2012	Mount Lemmon	Mount Lemmon Survey	VER	2.2 km	MPC · JPL
708620	2012 FX_{101}	—	March 31, 2012	Mount Lemmon	Mount Lemmon Survey	(69559)	2.6 km	MPC · JPL
708621	2012 FM_{102}	—	March 28, 2012	Mount Lemmon	Mount Lemmon Survey	·	910 m	MPC · JPL
708622	2012 FQ_{102}	—	March 29, 2012	Mount Lemmon	Mount Lemmon Survey	·	2.0 km	MPC · JPL
708623	2012 FB_{103}	—	March 29, 2012	Kitt Peak	Spacewatch	·	900 m	MPC · JPL
708624	2012 FV_{103}	—	March 16, 2012	Haleakala	Pan-STARRS 1	·	3.0 km	MPC · JPL
708625	2012 FW_{103}	—	March 16, 2012	Mount Lemmon	Mount Lemmon Survey	EOS	1.5 km	MPC · JPL
708626	2012 FS_{107}	—	March 17, 2012	Mount Lemmon	Mount Lemmon Survey	·	2.2 km	MPC · JPL
708627	2012 FR_{108}	—	March 30, 2012	Mount Lemmon	Mount Lemmon Survey	MAS	610 m	MPC · JPL
708628	2012 FZ_{111}	—	March 28, 2012	Kitt Peak	Spacewatch	·	2.3 km	MPC · JPL
708629	2012 FK_{113}	—	March 23, 2012	Mount Lemmon	Mount Lemmon Survey	KOR	1.1 km	MPC · JPL
708630	2012 FL_{113}	—	March 27, 2008	Kitt Peak	Spacewatch	·	950 m	MPC · JPL
708631	2012 FT_{114}	—	March 23, 2012	Mount Lemmon	Mount Lemmon Survey	·	660 m	MPC · JPL
708632	2012 GM_{2}	—	March 9, 2005	Mount Lemmon	Mount Lemmon Survey	·	650 m	MPC · JPL
708633	2012 GH_{6}	—	April 12, 2012	Haleakala	Pan-STARRS 1	·	1.8 km	MPC · JPL
708634	2012 GT_{6}	—	April 12, 2012	Haleakala	Pan-STARRS 1	·	1.7 km	MPC · JPL
708635	2012 GW_{6}	—	April 1, 2012	Mount Lemmon	Mount Lemmon Survey	·	2.4 km	MPC · JPL
708636	2012 GU_{9}	—	November 9, 2004	Mauna Kea	P. A. Wiegert, A. Papadimos	·	1.4 km	MPC · JPL
708637	2012 GV_{12}	—	March 27, 2012	Kitt Peak	Spacewatch	·	1.9 km	MPC · JPL
708638	2012 GX_{13}	—	October 16, 2006	Kitt Peak	Spacewatch	·	1.2 km	MPC · JPL
708639	2012 GJ_{14}	—	June 18, 2005	Mount Lemmon	Mount Lemmon Survey	NYS	1.1 km	MPC · JPL
708640	2012 GN_{15}	—	April 13, 2012	Haleakala	Pan-STARRS 1	·	2.7 km	MPC · JPL
708641	2012 GT_{16}	—	September 16, 2010	Mount Lemmon	Mount Lemmon Survey	·	730 m	MPC · JPL
708642	2012 GT_{17}	—	April 15, 2012	Haleakala	Pan-STARRS 1	PHO	880 m	MPC · JPL
708643	2012 GS_{19}	—	March 28, 2012	Kitt Peak	Spacewatch	THM	1.9 km	MPC · JPL
708644	2012 GU_{20}	—	April 15, 2012	Haleakala	Pan-STARRS 1	PHO	980 m	MPC · JPL
708645	2012 GW_{23}	—	April 11, 2007	Kitt Peak	Spacewatch	EOS	1.8 km	MPC · JPL
708646	2012 GR_{25}	—	March 14, 2008	Mount Lemmon	Mount Lemmon Survey	MAS	700 m	MPC · JPL
708647	2012 GV_{25}	—	March 16, 2012	Kitt Peak	Spacewatch	·	2.5 km	MPC · JPL
708648	2012 GJ_{28}	—	February 9, 2011	Mount Lemmon	Mount Lemmon Survey	·	2.5 km	MPC · JPL
708649	2012 GN_{28}	—	February 24, 2006	Kitt Peak	Spacewatch	·	2.4 km	MPC · JPL
708650	2012 GH_{31}	—	February 28, 2012	Oukaïmeden	M. Ory	·	3.5 km	MPC · JPL
708651	2012 GJ_{35}	—	March 4, 2008	Kitt Peak	Spacewatch	·	1.3 km	MPC · JPL
708652	2012 GN_{36}	—	March 15, 2012	Haleakala	Pan-STARRS 1	TIR	2.7 km	MPC · JPL
708653	2012 GT_{37}	—	February 2, 2006	Kitt Peak	Spacewatch	·	2.4 km	MPC · JPL
708654	2012 GJ_{39}	—	January 27, 2006	Mount Lemmon	Mount Lemmon Survey	·	2.9 km	MPC · JPL
708655	2012 GL_{41}	—	April 15, 2012	Haleakala	Pan-STARRS 1	·	2.3 km	MPC · JPL
708656	2012 GO_{41}	—	April 15, 2012	Haleakala	Pan-STARRS 1	EOS	1.5 km	MPC · JPL
708657	2012 GR_{41}	—	March 25, 2012	Kitt Peak	Spacewatch	·	2.9 km	MPC · JPL
708658 Turowicz	2012 GJ_{42}	Turowicz	September 3, 2013	Tincana	Zolnowski, M., Kusiak, M.	·	850 m	MPC · JPL
708659	2012 GW_{42}	—	September 9, 2015	Haleakala	Pan-STARRS 1	·	2.5 km	MPC · JPL
708660	2012 GZ_{42}	—	December 14, 2015	Haleakala	Pan-STARRS 1	·	2.4 km	MPC · JPL
708661	2012 GK_{46}	—	August 27, 2014	Haleakala	Pan-STARRS 1	·	1.8 km	MPC · JPL
708662	2012 GL_{46}	—	September 19, 2014	Haleakala	Pan-STARRS 1	EOS	1.5 km	MPC · JPL
708663	2012 GQ_{46}	—	December 9, 2015	Haleakala	Pan-STARRS 1	·	2.4 km	MPC · JPL
708664	2012 GH_{47}	—	May 20, 2018	Haleakala	Pan-STARRS 1	·	1.6 km	MPC · JPL
708665	2012 GC_{48}	—	April 15, 2012	Haleakala	Pan-STARRS 1	·	2.1 km	MPC · JPL
708666	2012 GM_{48}	—	April 12, 2012	Haleakala	Pan-STARRS 1	·	1.6 km	MPC · JPL
708667	2012 GQ_{50}	—	April 15, 2012	Haleakala	Pan-STARRS 1	URS	2.6 km	MPC · JPL
708668	2012 GW_{53}	—	February 10, 2011	Mount Lemmon	Mount Lemmon Survey	HYG	1.9 km	MPC · JPL
708669	2012 HF_{1}	—	June 24, 2009	Mount Lemmon	Mount Lemmon Survey	·	640 m	MPC · JPL
708670	2012 HA_{6}	—	April 17, 2012	Kitt Peak	Spacewatch	·	3.2 km	MPC · JPL
708671	2012 HA_{11}	—	April 19, 2007	Kitt Peak	Spacewatch	·	2.3 km	MPC · JPL
708672	2012 HL_{12}	—	February 2, 2006	Mount Lemmon	Mount Lemmon Survey	·	3.0 km	MPC · JPL
708673	2012 HM_{12}	—	April 15, 2012	Catalina	CSS	·	3.0 km	MPC · JPL
708674	2012 HH_{14}	—	October 24, 2005	Mauna Kea	A. Boattini	·	2.2 km	MPC · JPL
708675	2012 HJ_{17}	—	April 21, 2012	Mount Lemmon	Mount Lemmon Survey	·	2.9 km	MPC · JPL
708676	2012 HW_{19}	—	March 7, 2008	Kitt Peak	Spacewatch	·	1.1 km	MPC · JPL
708677	2012 HL_{22}	—	April 20, 2012	Haleakala	Pan-STARRS 1	·	2.9 km	MPC · JPL
708678	2012 HR_{22}	—	April 20, 2012	Haleakala	Pan-STARRS 1	·	1.5 km	MPC · JPL
708679	2012 HO_{28}	—	April 16, 2012	Kitt Peak	Spacewatch	·	2.8 km	MPC · JPL
708680	2012 HV_{29}	—	March 29, 2012	Mount Lemmon	Mount Lemmon Survey	HYG	2.6 km	MPC · JPL
708681	2012 HR_{30}	—	March 28, 2012	Kitt Peak	Spacewatch	·	3.0 km	MPC · JPL
708682	2012 HV_{38}	—	July 28, 2005	Palomar	NEAT	NYS	1.1 km	MPC · JPL
708683	2012 HY_{40}	—	January 30, 2012	Mount Lemmon	Mount Lemmon Survey	LIX	3.0 km	MPC · JPL
708684	2012 HB_{42}	—	April 13, 2012	Kitt Peak	Spacewatch	·	2.6 km	MPC · JPL
708685	2012 HM_{44}	—	March 4, 2008	Mount Lemmon	Mount Lemmon Survey	PHO	880 m	MPC · JPL
708686	2012 HB_{55}	—	February 24, 2006	Palomar	NEAT	·	2.8 km	MPC · JPL
708687	2012 HJ_{55}	—	March 27, 2012	Mount Lemmon	Mount Lemmon Survey	·	2.0 km	MPC · JPL
708688	2012 HN_{55}	—	April 16, 2012	Haleakala	Pan-STARRS 1	·	2.1 km	MPC · JPL
708689	2012 HM_{66}	—	March 10, 2011	Mount Lemmon	Mount Lemmon Survey	·	3.2 km	MPC · JPL
708690	2012 HY_{68}	—	April 21, 2012	Haleakala	Pan-STARRS 1	·	2.5 km	MPC · JPL
708691	2012 HW_{69}	—	January 13, 2011	Mount Lemmon	Mount Lemmon Survey	·	2.7 km	MPC · JPL
708692	2012 HZ_{69}	—	October 20, 2003	Kitt Peak	Spacewatch	EOS	1.9 km	MPC · JPL
708693	2012 HW_{70}	—	April 24, 2012	Kitt Peak	Spacewatch	·	2.6 km	MPC · JPL
708694	2012 HJ_{73}	—	April 27, 2012	Kitt Peak	Spacewatch	·	2.4 km	MPC · JPL
708695	2012 HU_{75}	—	October 27, 2009	Kitt Peak	Spacewatch	·	2.4 km	MPC · JPL
708696	2012 HF_{77}	—	October 23, 2003	Kitt Peak	Spacewatch	T_{j} (2.96)	4.0 km	MPC · JPL
708697	2012 HE_{81}	—	April 18, 2012	Kitt Peak	Spacewatch	·	1.8 km	MPC · JPL
708698	2012 HK_{81}	—	April 30, 2012	Kitt Peak	Spacewatch	·	2.2 km	MPC · JPL
708699	2012 HR_{83}	—	December 2, 2010	Kitt Peak	Spacewatch	·	3.0 km	MPC · JPL
708700	2012 HX_{84}	—	April 14, 2012	Haleakala	Pan-STARRS 1	·	860 m	MPC · JPL

== 708701–708800 ==
back to top

Designation			Discovery			Properties		Ref
Permanent	Provisional	Named after	Date	Site	Discoverer(s)	Category	Diam.	Ref
708701	2012 HB_{86}	—	January 29, 2011	Mount Lemmon	Mount Lemmon Survey	·	2.4 km	MPC · JPL
708702	2012 HF_{86}	—	April 19, 2012	Mount Lemmon	Mount Lemmon Survey	THM	1.7 km	MPC · JPL
708703	2012 HJ_{86}	—	April 20, 2012	Kitt Peak	Spacewatch	·	2.1 km	MPC · JPL
708704	2012 HR_{86}	—	April 19, 2012	Charleston	R. Holmes	·	2.0 km	MPC · JPL
708705	2012 HY_{86}	—	April 24, 2012	Haleakala	Pan-STARRS 1	·	2.7 km	MPC · JPL
708706	2012 HU_{87}	—	April 27, 2012	Haleakala	Pan-STARRS 1	EOS	1.6 km	MPC · JPL
708707	2012 HJ_{88}	—	November 18, 2003	Kitt Peak	Spacewatch	·	3.1 km	MPC · JPL
708708	2012 HN_{88}	—	April 21, 2012	Mount Lemmon	Mount Lemmon Survey	VER	2.2 km	MPC · JPL
708709	2012 HP_{88}	—	April 21, 2012	Mount Lemmon	Mount Lemmon Survey	VER	2.2 km	MPC · JPL
708710	2012 HZ_{88}	—	April 17, 2012	Kitt Peak	Spacewatch	·	2.5 km	MPC · JPL
708711	2012 HD_{89}	—	October 1, 2014	Haleakala	Pan-STARRS 1	·	2.4 km	MPC · JPL
708712	2012 HP_{90}	—	December 4, 2015	Mount Lemmon	Mount Lemmon Survey	·	2.1 km	MPC · JPL
708713	2012 HM_{91}	—	February 13, 2015	Mount Lemmon	Mount Lemmon Survey	·	1.1 km	MPC · JPL
708714	2012 HU_{92}	—	May 25, 2006	Kitt Peak	Spacewatch	·	2.6 km	MPC · JPL
708715	2012 HS_{93}	—	April 16, 2012	Haleakala	Pan-STARRS 1	·	2.7 km	MPC · JPL
708716	2012 HC_{94}	—	November 20, 2014	Haleakala	Pan-STARRS 1	·	2.0 km	MPC · JPL
708717	2012 HD_{94}	—	September 19, 2014	Haleakala	Pan-STARRS 1	·	2.3 km	MPC · JPL
708718	2012 HF_{94}	—	March 9, 2006	Kitt Peak	Spacewatch	·	2.5 km	MPC · JPL
708719	2012 HE_{95}	—	February 20, 2006	Kitt Peak	Spacewatch	·	2.3 km	MPC · JPL
708720	2012 HY_{95}	—	October 1, 2014	Haleakala	Pan-STARRS 1	VER	2.4 km	MPC · JPL
708721	2012 HV_{96}	—	November 11, 2014	Haleakala	Pan-STARRS 1	·	2.3 km	MPC · JPL
708722 Timișoara	2012 HW_{96}	Timișoara	September 8, 2013	La Palma	EURONEAR	PHO	770 m	MPC · JPL
708723	2012 HB_{97}	—	April 28, 2012	Kitt Peak	Spacewatch	·	2.1 km	MPC · JPL
708724	2012 HM_{97}	—	September 6, 2013	Kitt Peak	Spacewatch	·	980 m	MPC · JPL
708725	2012 HB_{98}	—	April 16, 2012	Haleakala	Pan-STARRS 1	·	2.4 km	MPC · JPL
708726	2012 HC_{98}	—	April 19, 2012	Mount Lemmon	Mount Lemmon Survey	·	820 m	MPC · JPL
708727	2012 HT_{98}	—	April 29, 2012	Mount Lemmon	Mount Lemmon Survey	·	2.6 km	MPC · JPL
708728	2012 HU_{98}	—	April 29, 2012	Kitt Peak	Spacewatch	·	2.2 km	MPC · JPL
708729	2012 HH_{99}	—	April 19, 2012	Mount Lemmon	Mount Lemmon Survey	THM	2.0 km	MPC · JPL
708730	2012 HM_{101}	—	April 19, 2012	Kitt Peak	Spacewatch	·	2.3 km	MPC · JPL
708731	2012 HW_{103}	—	April 20, 2012	Mount Lemmon	Mount Lemmon Survey	·	2.8 km	MPC · JPL
708732	2012 HF_{104}	—	April 27, 2012	Haleakala	Pan-STARRS 1	·	2.0 km	MPC · JPL
708733	2012 HW_{104}	—	April 30, 2012	Kitt Peak	Spacewatch	·	2.2 km	MPC · JPL
708734	2012 HH_{107}	—	February 7, 2011	Mount Lemmon	Mount Lemmon Survey	·	1.5 km	MPC · JPL
708735	2012 HK_{107}	—	April 27, 2012	Haleakala	Pan-STARRS 1	KOR	930 m	MPC · JPL
708736	2012 HB_{108}	—	April 30, 2012	Kitt Peak	Spacewatch	·	2.5 km	MPC · JPL
708737	2012 HQ_{109}	—	April 28, 2012	Mount Lemmon	Mount Lemmon Survey	·	1.1 km	MPC · JPL
708738	2012 HA_{111}	—	April 27, 2012	Haleakala	Pan-STARRS 1	·	2.3 km	MPC · JPL
708739	2012 HN_{111}	—	April 27, 2012	Haleakala	Pan-STARRS 1	·	2.5 km	MPC · JPL
708740	2012 HT_{117}	—	April 16, 2012	Haleakala	Pan-STARRS 1	·	2.6 km	MPC · JPL
708741	2012 HX_{117}	—	April 27, 2012	Haleakala	Pan-STARRS 1	·	2.3 km	MPC · JPL
708742	2012 JE	—	November 13, 2005	Palomar	NEAT	H	610 m	MPC · JPL
708743	2012 JH_{5}	—	November 8, 2010	Catalina	CSS	H	480 m	MPC · JPL
708744	2012 JR_{6}	—	April 29, 2012	Kitt Peak	Spacewatch	·	2.3 km	MPC · JPL
708745	2012 JH_{7}	—	April 30, 2012	Mount Lemmon	Mount Lemmon Survey	·	3.1 km	MPC · JPL
708746	2012 JT_{7}	—	April 29, 2012	Kitt Peak	Spacewatch	·	1.0 km	MPC · JPL
708747	2012 JU_{7}	—	April 25, 2012	Kitt Peak	Spacewatch	·	2.3 km	MPC · JPL
708748	2012 JM_{13}	—	May 14, 2012	Mount Lemmon	Mount Lemmon Survey	V	500 m	MPC · JPL
708749	2012 JD_{14}	—	May 14, 2012	Mount Lemmon	Mount Lemmon Survey	·	3.2 km	MPC · JPL
708750	2012 JO_{14}	—	May 1, 2012	Mount Lemmon	Mount Lemmon Survey	·	900 m	MPC · JPL
708751	2012 JQ_{14}	—	May 1, 2012	Mount Lemmon	Mount Lemmon Survey	VER	2.4 km	MPC · JPL
708752	2012 JD_{15}	—	May 12, 2012	Mount Lemmon	Mount Lemmon Survey	EOS	1.5 km	MPC · JPL
708753	2012 JP_{17}	—	April 19, 2012	Mount Lemmon	Mount Lemmon Survey	T_{j} (2.98)	3.8 km	MPC · JPL
708754	2012 JZ_{17}	—	October 24, 2009	Mount Lemmon	Mount Lemmon Survey	·	2.6 km	MPC · JPL
708755	2012 JP_{18}	—	May 11, 2007	Mount Lemmon	Mount Lemmon Survey	EOS	1.8 km	MPC · JPL
708756	2012 JF_{27}	—	May 15, 2012	Mount Lemmon	Mount Lemmon Survey	·	2.8 km	MPC · JPL
708757	2012 JG_{27}	—	March 31, 2012	Mount Lemmon	Mount Lemmon Survey	·	3.0 km	MPC · JPL
708758	2012 JW_{27}	—	February 4, 2011	Catalina	CSS	·	2.8 km	MPC · JPL
708759	2012 JE_{28}	—	October 23, 2008	Kitt Peak	Spacewatch	·	2.0 km	MPC · JPL
708760	2012 JA_{30}	—	September 5, 2008	Kitt Peak	Spacewatch	VER	2.5 km	MPC · JPL
708761	2012 JK_{30}	—	September 15, 2009	Kitt Peak	Spacewatch	·	1.1 km	MPC · JPL
708762	2012 JN_{30}	—	May 15, 2012	Haleakala	Pan-STARRS 1	·	2.7 km	MPC · JPL
708763	2012 JT_{30}	—	December 30, 2007	Kitt Peak	Spacewatch	·	600 m	MPC · JPL
708764	2012 JR_{31}	—	May 15, 2012	Haleakala	Pan-STARRS 1	·	2.5 km	MPC · JPL
708765	2012 JS_{31}	—	May 15, 2012	Haleakala	Pan-STARRS 1	·	1.1 km	MPC · JPL
708766	2012 JB_{32}	—	April 25, 2007	Kitt Peak	Spacewatch	EOS	1.9 km	MPC · JPL
708767	2012 JL_{32}	—	April 27, 2012	Kitt Peak	Spacewatch	·	2.6 km	MPC · JPL
708768	2012 JM_{33}	—	May 7, 2006	Mount Lemmon	Mount Lemmon Survey	·	3.0 km	MPC · JPL
708769	2012 JV_{34}	—	May 14, 2012	Haleakala	Pan-STARRS 1	·	2.6 km	MPC · JPL
708770	2012 JL_{35}	—	May 15, 2012	Mount Lemmon	Mount Lemmon Survey	·	2.4 km	MPC · JPL
708771	2012 JR_{36}	—	April 30, 2012	Mount Lemmon	Mount Lemmon Survey	·	2.4 km	MPC · JPL
708772	2012 JU_{36}	—	October 22, 2003	Apache Point	SDSS	·	3.3 km	MPC · JPL
708773	2012 JS_{37}	—	April 27, 2012	Kitt Peak	Spacewatch	·	1.9 km	MPC · JPL
708774	2012 JB_{38}	—	May 1, 2012	Mount Lemmon	Mount Lemmon Survey	LIX	2.6 km	MPC · JPL
708775	2012 JJ_{39}	—	February 5, 2011	Haleakala	Pan-STARRS 1	·	2.3 km	MPC · JPL
708776	2012 JC_{44}	—	May 15, 2012	Haleakala	Pan-STARRS 1	·	2.0 km	MPC · JPL
708777	2012 JU_{44}	—	May 1, 2012	Mount Lemmon	Mount Lemmon Survey	·	2.6 km	MPC · JPL
708778	2012 JZ_{44}	—	March 16, 2004	Kitt Peak	Spacewatch	·	1.2 km	MPC · JPL
708779	2012 JT_{47}	—	December 9, 2010	Mount Lemmon	Mount Lemmon Survey	·	2.7 km	MPC · JPL
708780	2012 JN_{48}	—	September 6, 2008	Mount Lemmon	Mount Lemmon Survey	THM	1.8 km	MPC · JPL
708781	2012 JX_{50}	—	May 13, 2012	Mount Lemmon	Mount Lemmon Survey	EOS	1.4 km	MPC · JPL
708782	2012 JQ_{51}	—	May 14, 2012	Mount Lemmon	Mount Lemmon Survey	LUT	2.9 km	MPC · JPL
708783	2012 JA_{52}	—	January 10, 2008	Kitt Peak	Spacewatch	V	580 m	MPC · JPL
708784	2012 JN_{52}	—	April 27, 2012	Haleakala	Pan-STARRS 1	·	2.4 km	MPC · JPL
708785	2012 JM_{53}	—	May 15, 2012	Mount Lemmon	Mount Lemmon Survey	·	1.4 km	MPC · JPL
708786	2012 JH_{57}	—	May 12, 2012	Mount Lemmon	Mount Lemmon Survey	·	2.4 km	MPC · JPL
708787	2012 JT_{57}	—	May 12, 2012	Mount Lemmon	Mount Lemmon Survey	·	3.2 km	MPC · JPL
708788	2012 JV_{58}	—	April 15, 2012	Haleakala	Pan-STARRS 1	·	2.2 km	MPC · JPL
708789	2012 JK_{59}	—	May 13, 2012	Mount Lemmon	Mount Lemmon Survey	·	1.6 km	MPC · JPL
708790	2012 JN_{59}	—	May 13, 2012	Mount Lemmon	Mount Lemmon Survey	THM	1.7 km	MPC · JPL
708791	2012 JH_{60}	—	May 13, 2012	Mount Lemmon	Mount Lemmon Survey	V	550 m	MPC · JPL
708792	2012 JQ_{60}	—	September 26, 2003	Apache Point	SDSS Collaboration	EOS	1.6 km	MPC · JPL
708793	2012 JP_{61}	—	April 29, 2012	Mount Lemmon	Mount Lemmon Survey	·	950 m	MPC · JPL
708794	2012 JS_{63}	—	May 15, 2012	Mount Lemmon	Mount Lemmon Survey	NYS	890 m	MPC · JPL
708795	2012 JK_{68}	—	May 15, 2012	Mount Lemmon	Mount Lemmon Survey	·	1.3 km	MPC · JPL
708796	2012 JH_{70}	—	May 1, 2012	Mount Lemmon	Mount Lemmon Survey	·	2.4 km	MPC · JPL
708797	2012 JK_{70}	—	May 1, 2012	Kitt Peak	Spacewatch	·	2.4 km	MPC · JPL
708798	2012 KG_{2}	—	February 9, 2011	Mount Lemmon	Mount Lemmon Survey	T_{j} (2.98)	3.2 km	MPC · JPL
708799	2012 KX_{2}	—	May 17, 2012	Mount Lemmon	Mount Lemmon Survey	·	2.2 km	MPC · JPL
708800	2012 KL_{3}	—	May 17, 2012	Mount Lemmon	Mount Lemmon Survey	·	1.1 km	MPC · JPL

== 708801–708900 ==
back to top

Designation			Discovery			Properties		Ref
Permanent	Provisional	Named after	Date	Site	Discoverer(s)	Category	Diam.	Ref
708801	2012 KX_{3}	—	October 23, 2003	Apache Point	SDSS	·	2.2 km	MPC · JPL
708802	2012 KR_{10}	—	May 16, 2012	Mount Lemmon	Mount Lemmon Survey	·	2.8 km	MPC · JPL
708803	2012 KJ_{13}	—	May 16, 2012	Mount Lemmon	Mount Lemmon Survey	·	1.6 km	MPC · JPL
708804	2012 KM_{13}	—	November 23, 2009	Kitt Peak	Spacewatch	·	2.7 km	MPC · JPL
708805	2012 KH_{15}	—	May 19, 2012	Mount Lemmon	Mount Lemmon Survey	·	2.6 km	MPC · JPL
708806	2012 KP_{21}	—	December 3, 2010	Mount Lemmon	Mount Lemmon Survey	V	590 m	MPC · JPL
708807	2012 KV_{21}	—	February 13, 2011	Mount Lemmon	Mount Lemmon Survey	·	2.2 km	MPC · JPL
708808	2012 KC_{22}	—	May 17, 2012	Mount Lemmon	Mount Lemmon Survey	·	2.5 km	MPC · JPL
708809	2012 KF_{22}	—	April 27, 2012	Haleakala	Pan-STARRS 1	EOS	1.8 km	MPC · JPL
708810	2012 KY_{23}	—	May 20, 2012	Mount Lemmon	Mount Lemmon Survey	·	1.8 km	MPC · JPL
708811	2012 KN_{26}	—	May 16, 2012	Mount Lemmon	Mount Lemmon Survey	·	2.1 km	MPC · JPL
708812	2012 KE_{28}	—	March 12, 2011	Mount Lemmon	Mount Lemmon Survey	EOS	1.7 km	MPC · JPL
708813	2012 KG_{28}	—	March 2, 2011	Mount Lemmon	Mount Lemmon Survey	(159)	2.0 km	MPC · JPL
708814	2012 KD_{29}	—	February 25, 2007	Kitt Peak	Spacewatch	·	1.4 km	MPC · JPL
708815	2012 KF_{29}	—	April 27, 2012	Haleakala	Pan-STARRS 1	VER	2.1 km	MPC · JPL
708816	2012 KN_{31}	—	May 16, 2012	Mount Lemmon	Mount Lemmon Survey	·	920 m	MPC · JPL
708817	2012 KQ_{33}	—	May 16, 2012	Mount Lemmon	Mount Lemmon Survey	·	2.3 km	MPC · JPL
708818	2012 KR_{34}	—	May 16, 2012	Mount Lemmon	Mount Lemmon Survey	·	2.9 km	MPC · JPL
708819	2012 KW_{38}	—	October 28, 2010	Catalina	CSS	·	2.0 km	MPC · JPL
708820	2012 KN_{40}	—	May 19, 2012	Mount Lemmon	Mount Lemmon Survey	·	2.7 km	MPC · JPL
708821	2012 KV_{42}	—	May 22, 2012	Mount Lemmon	Mount Lemmon Survey	TIR	2.5 km	MPC · JPL
708822	2012 KY_{43}	—	May 21, 2012	Haleakala	Pan-STARRS 1	VER	2.4 km	MPC · JPL
708823	2012 KG_{45}	—	January 25, 2009	Catalina	CSS	H	550 m	MPC · JPL
708824	2012 KA_{47}	—	May 27, 2012	Catalina	CSS	·	840 m	MPC · JPL
708825	2012 KB_{52}	—	May 16, 2012	Kitt Peak	Spacewatch	·	2.3 km	MPC · JPL
708826	2012 KL_{52}	—	May 20, 2012	Mount Lemmon	Mount Lemmon Survey	·	2.6 km	MPC · JPL
708827	2012 KT_{52}	—	August 15, 2001	Haleakala	NEAT	·	2.8 km	MPC · JPL
708828	2012 KA_{53}	—	May 29, 2012	Mount Lemmon	Mount Lemmon Survey	·	610 m	MPC · JPL
708829	2012 KF_{53}	—	May 30, 2012	Mount Lemmon	Mount Lemmon Survey	T_{j} (2.97)	3.0 km	MPC · JPL
708830	2012 KM_{53}	—	May 29, 2012	Mount Lemmon	Mount Lemmon Survey	EOS	1.4 km	MPC · JPL
708831	2012 KH_{54}	—	May 22, 2012	Mount Lemmon	Mount Lemmon Survey	·	3.1 km	MPC · JPL
708832	2012 KU_{55}	—	May 16, 2012	Haleakala	Pan-STARRS 1	·	2.6 km	MPC · JPL
708833	2012 KB_{56}	—	May 21, 2012	Haleakala	Pan-STARRS 1	·	2.3 km	MPC · JPL
708834	2012 KR_{56}	—	May 20, 2018	Haleakala	Pan-STARRS 1	·	2.7 km	MPC · JPL
708835	2012 KS_{56}	—	July 16, 2013	Haleakala	Pan-STARRS 1	EOS	1.4 km	MPC · JPL
708836	2012 KY_{56}	—	May 6, 2017	Haleakala	Pan-STARRS 1	·	3.0 km	MPC · JPL
708837	2012 KJ_{57}	—	January 12, 2016	Haleakala	Pan-STARRS 1	·	2.2 km	MPC · JPL
708838	2012 KV_{59}	—	May 19, 2012	Mount Lemmon	Mount Lemmon Survey	·	2.1 km	MPC · JPL
708839	2012 KC_{60}	—	May 29, 2012	Mount Lemmon	Mount Lemmon Survey	·	3.1 km	MPC · JPL
708840	2012 KQ_{60}	—	May 21, 2012	Haleakala	Pan-STARRS 1	·	540 m	MPC · JPL
708841	2012 KY_{60}	—	May 21, 2012	Haleakala	Pan-STARRS 1	·	1.1 km	MPC · JPL
708842	2012 KG_{62}	—	May 21, 2012	Mount Lemmon	Mount Lemmon Survey	·	3.1 km	MPC · JPL
708843	2012 KQ_{64}	—	May 21, 2012	Mount Lemmon	Mount Lemmon Survey	·	2.2 km	MPC · JPL
708844	2012 KT_{66}	—	May 27, 2012	Mount Lemmon	Mount Lemmon Survey	·	2.4 km	MPC · JPL
708845	2012 LB_{6}	—	May 21, 2012	Mount Lemmon	Mount Lemmon Survey	·	3.4 km	MPC · JPL
708846	2012 LS_{6}	—	April 26, 2006	Kitt Peak	Spacewatch	·	2.6 km	MPC · JPL
708847	2012 LF_{7}	—	June 9, 2012	Mount Lemmon	Mount Lemmon Survey	VER	2.0 km	MPC · JPL
708848	2012 LJ_{7}	—	June 9, 2012	Mount Lemmon	Mount Lemmon Survey	PHO	780 m	MPC · JPL
708849	2012 LS_{7}	—	June 12, 2012	Haleakala	Pan-STARRS 1	H	560 m	MPC · JPL
708850	2012 LR_{15}	—	May 20, 2012	Mount Lemmon	Mount Lemmon Survey	·	2.9 km	MPC · JPL
708851	2012 LC_{17}	—	May 3, 2008	Kitt Peak	Spacewatch	·	1.1 km	MPC · JPL
708852	2012 LJ_{20}	—	June 9, 2012	Mount Lemmon	Mount Lemmon Survey	GEF	1.1 km	MPC · JPL
708853	2012 LO_{20}	—	June 8, 2002	Socorro	LINEAR	·	600 m	MPC · JPL
708854	2012 LW_{22}	—	May 21, 2012	Mount Lemmon	Mount Lemmon Survey	·	2.2 km	MPC · JPL
708855	2012 LB_{27}	—	June 9, 2012	Haleakala	Pan-STARRS 1	centaur	60 km	MPC · JPL
708856	2012 LO_{27}	—	September 5, 2016	Mount Lemmon	Mount Lemmon Survey	·	950 m	MPC · JPL
708857	2012 LD_{28}	—	June 1, 2012	Mount Lemmon	Mount Lemmon Survey	·	1.1 km	MPC · JPL
708858	2012 LC_{29}	—	June 15, 2012	Mount Lemmon	Mount Lemmon Survey	·	3.3 km	MPC · JPL
708859	2012 LP_{29}	—	February 3, 2016	Haleakala	Pan-STARRS 1	·	3.0 km	MPC · JPL
708860	2012 LZ_{30}	—	November 4, 2018	Mount Lemmon	Mount Lemmon Survey	·	1.8 km	MPC · JPL
708861	2012 LQ_{31}	—	June 9, 2012	Mount Lemmon	Mount Lemmon Survey	·	840 m	MPC · JPL
708862	2012 LD_{32}	—	June 9, 2012	Mount Lemmon	Mount Lemmon Survey	AGN	1.1 km	MPC · JPL
708863	2012 LF_{32}	—	June 8, 2012	Mount Lemmon	Mount Lemmon Survey	·	1.8 km	MPC · JPL
708864	2012 MD	—	June 16, 2012	Mount Lemmon	Mount Lemmon Survey	·	1.4 km	MPC · JPL
708865	2012 ML_{2}	—	May 27, 2012	Mount Lemmon	Mount Lemmon Survey	PHO	1.1 km	MPC · JPL
708866	2012 ME_{3}	—	May 16, 2012	Haleakala	Pan-STARRS 1	·	2.3 km	MPC · JPL
708867	2012 MD_{4}	—	September 22, 2008	Kitt Peak	Spacewatch	·	2.5 km	MPC · JPL
708868	2012 MY_{4}	—	September 14, 2007	Mount Lemmon	Mount Lemmon Survey	THM	2.0 km	MPC · JPL
708869	2012 MD_{6}	—	June 19, 2012	Mount Lemmon	Mount Lemmon Survey	T_{j} (2.97)	3.3 km	MPC · JPL
708870	2012 MT_{9}	—	June 16, 2012	Mount Lemmon	Mount Lemmon Survey	·	2.4 km	MPC · JPL
708871	2012 MX_{9}	—	May 4, 2006	Siding Spring	SSS	·	3.3 km	MPC · JPL
708872	2012 MV_{10}	—	June 17, 2012	Mount Lemmon	Mount Lemmon Survey	·	2.9 km	MPC · JPL
708873	2012 MY_{12}	—	April 13, 2011	Haleakala	Pan-STARRS 1	VER	2.9 km	MPC · JPL
708874	2012 MD_{17}	—	November 28, 2013	Kitt Peak	Spacewatch	EUN	1.3 km	MPC · JPL
708875	2012 ME_{17}	—	November 17, 2014	Haleakala	Pan-STARRS 1	·	1.6 km	MPC · JPL
708876	2012 MO_{19}	—	December 1, 2005	Kitt Peak	Wasserman, L. H., Millis, R. L.	·	1.7 km	MPC · JPL
708877	2012 ND	—	July 12, 2012	SM Montmagastrell	J. M. Bosch, R. M. Olivera	·	840 m	MPC · JPL
708878	2012 OL_{3}	—	September 5, 2004	Palomar	NEAT	·	1.2 km	MPC · JPL
708879	2012 OS_{7}	—	July 28, 2012	Haleakala	Pan-STARRS 1	·	2.9 km	MPC · JPL
708880	2012 PZ_{2}	—	August 8, 2012	Haleakala	Pan-STARRS 1	·	700 m	MPC · JPL
708881	2012 PJ_{3}	—	February 11, 2002	Kitt Peak	Spacewatch	·	1.3 km	MPC · JPL
708882	2012 PP_{4}	—	February 8, 2000	Apache Point	SDSS Collaboration	H	630 m	MPC · JPL
708883	2012 PA_{9}	—	August 8, 2012	Haleakala	Pan-STARRS 1	·	2.6 km	MPC · JPL
708884	2012 PZ_{29}	—	January 20, 2009	Mount Lemmon	Mount Lemmon Survey	·	3.5 km	MPC · JPL
708885	2012 PK_{33}	—	August 6, 2012	Haleakala	Pan-STARRS 1	·	2.9 km	MPC · JPL
708886	2012 PG_{39}	—	August 8, 2012	Haleakala	Pan-STARRS 1	MAR	900 m	MPC · JPL
708887	2012 PA_{40}	—	August 12, 2012	Haleakala	Pan-STARRS 1	H	430 m	MPC · JPL
708888	2012 PK_{41}	—	February 12, 2004	Kitt Peak	Spacewatch	·	3.1 km	MPC · JPL
708889	2012 PX_{42}	—	September 18, 2003	Kitt Peak	Spacewatch	GEF	1.0 km	MPC · JPL
708890	2012 PJ_{43}	—	May 29, 2011	Kitt Peak	Spacewatch	·	3.0 km	MPC · JPL
708891	2012 PY_{44}	—	August 9, 2012	Haleakala	Pan-STARRS 1	·	870 m	MPC · JPL
708892	2012 PS_{49}	—	July 30, 2016	Haleakala	Pan-STARRS 1	·	1.4 km	MPC · JPL
708893	2012 PY_{53}	—	August 13, 2012	Kitt Peak	Spacewatch	L5	7.2 km	MPC · JPL
708894	2012 PZ_{55}	—	August 12, 2012	Kitt Peak	Spacewatch	L5	8.2 km	MPC · JPL
708895	2012 PH_{56}	—	August 14, 2012	Haleakala	Pan-STARRS 1	·	1.2 km	MPC · JPL
708896	2012 PA_{60}	—	August 14, 2012	Kitt Peak	Spacewatch	·	2.7 km	MPC · JPL
708897	2012 PO_{61}	—	August 13, 2012	Haleakala	Pan-STARRS 1	HNS	770 m	MPC · JPL
708898	2012 QZ_{8}	—	August 17, 2012	ESA OGS	ESA OGS	·	1.0 km	MPC · JPL
708899	2012 QM_{12}	—	October 12, 2009	Mount Lemmon	Mount Lemmon Survey	V	550 m	MPC · JPL
708900	2012 QO_{23}	—	August 24, 2012	Kitt Peak	Spacewatch	·	800 m	MPC · JPL

== 708901–709000 ==
back to top

Designation			Discovery			Properties		Ref
Permanent	Provisional	Named after	Date	Site	Discoverer(s)	Category	Diam.	Ref
708901	2012 QW_{30}	—	August 25, 2012	Kitt Peak	Spacewatch	EUN	1.0 km	MPC · JPL
708902	2012 QC_{34}	—	September 20, 2008	Mount Lemmon	Mount Lemmon Survey	·	970 m	MPC · JPL
708903	2012 QO_{35}	—	August 25, 2012	Kitt Peak	Spacewatch	·	920 m	MPC · JPL
708904	2012 QS_{35}	—	October 9, 2004	Kitt Peak	Spacewatch	(5)	790 m	MPC · JPL
708905	2012 QL_{41}	—	August 22, 2012	Črni Vrh	Skvarč, J.	·	1.1 km	MPC · JPL
708906	2012 QE_{47}	—	August 17, 2012	Haleakala	Pan-STARRS 1	·	1.0 km	MPC · JPL
708907	2012 QQ_{48}	—	August 21, 2012	Haleakala	Pan-STARRS 1	·	1.1 km	MPC · JPL
708908	2012 QF_{54}	—	August 26, 2012	Haleakala	Pan-STARRS 1	·	1.0 km	MPC · JPL
708909	2012 QH_{54}	—	December 25, 2005	Kitt Peak	Spacewatch	MAS	590 m	MPC · JPL
708910	2012 QJ_{54}	—	August 13, 2012	Kitt Peak	Spacewatch	EUN	1.1 km	MPC · JPL
708911	2012 QR_{54}	—	August 25, 2012	Kitt Peak	Spacewatch	EOS	1.6 km	MPC · JPL
708912	2012 QV_{62}	—	August 25, 2012	Kitt Peak	Spacewatch	·	3.1 km	MPC · JPL
708913	2012 QY_{63}	—	July 28, 2011	Haleakala	Pan-STARRS 1	L5	8.0 km	MPC · JPL
708914	2012 QM_{64}	—	August 17, 2012	ESA OGS	ESA OGS	·	1.3 km	MPC · JPL
708915	2012 QO_{65}	—	August 24, 2012	Kitt Peak	Spacewatch	·	3.1 km	MPC · JPL
708916	2012 QB_{66}	—	August 16, 2012	Haleakala	Pan-STARRS 1	·	2.6 km	MPC · JPL
708917	2012 QC_{67}	—	August 26, 2012	Haleakala	Pan-STARRS 1	·	1 km	MPC · JPL
708918	2012 QH_{67}	—	August 26, 2012	Haleakala	Pan-STARRS 1	·	730 m	MPC · JPL
708919	2012 QM_{67}	—	August 24, 2012	Kitt Peak	Spacewatch	EUN	960 m	MPC · JPL
708920	2012 QW_{67}	—	August 26, 2012	Haleakala	Pan-STARRS 1	·	960 m	MPC · JPL
708921	2012 QE_{69}	—	August 26, 2012	Haleakala	Pan-STARRS 1	·	1.1 km	MPC · JPL
708922	2012 QM_{69}	—	August 24, 2012	Kitt Peak	Spacewatch	L5	6.5 km	MPC · JPL
708923	2012 QA_{70}	—	August 25, 2012	Haleakala	Pan-STARRS 1	·	1.3 km	MPC · JPL
708924	2012 QL_{73}	—	August 17, 2012	Haleakala	Pan-STARRS 1	·	1.1 km	MPC · JPL
708925	2012 QQ_{79}	—	August 26, 2012	Haleakala	Pan-STARRS 1	MAR	810 m	MPC · JPL
708926	2012 RS_{2}	—	August 12, 2012	Siding Spring	SSS	·	1.3 km	MPC · JPL
708927	2012 RA_{5}	—	September 4, 2012	Siding Spring	Guido, E.	·	940 m	MPC · JPL
708928	2012 RS_{5}	—	March 29, 2011	Mount Lemmon	Mount Lemmon Survey	MAS	610 m	MPC · JPL
708929	2012 RS_{10}	—	August 17, 2002	Palomar	NEAT	·	600 m	MPC · JPL
708930	2012 RW_{14}	—	September 15, 2012	Mount Lemmon	Mount Lemmon Survey	·	2.0 km	MPC · JPL
708931	2012 RT_{17}	—	September 14, 2012	Catalina	CSS	·	1.3 km	MPC · JPL
708932	2012 RN_{23}	—	October 23, 2008	Kitt Peak	Spacewatch	·	1.1 km	MPC · JPL
708933	2012 RW_{30}	—	February 6, 2002	Palomar	NEAT	·	1.3 km	MPC · JPL
708934	2012 RE_{31}	—	September 21, 2008	Kitt Peak	Spacewatch	·	1.0 km	MPC · JPL
708935	2012 RE_{39}	—	September 21, 2012	Mount Lemmon	Mount Lemmon Survey	L5	7.5 km	MPC · JPL
708936	2012 RL_{44}	—	September 14, 2012	ESA OGS	ESA OGS	EUN	1.2 km	MPC · JPL
708937	2012 RA_{45}	—	September 14, 2012	Kitt Peak	Spacewatch	RAF	740 m	MPC · JPL
708938	2012 RK_{47}	—	August 29, 2016	Mount Lemmon	Mount Lemmon Survey	·	1.2 km	MPC · JPL
708939	2012 RV_{47}	—	September 15, 2012	Mount Lemmon	Mount Lemmon Survey	·	950 m	MPC · JPL
708940	2012 RY_{47}	—	November 19, 2008	Kitt Peak	Spacewatch	·	1.2 km	MPC · JPL
708941	2012 SU_{5}	—	September 17, 2012	Mount Lemmon	Mount Lemmon Survey	·	1.6 km	MPC · JPL
708942	2012 SG_{11}	—	February 9, 2011	Mount Lemmon	Mount Lemmon Survey	·	1.1 km	MPC · JPL
708943	2012 SF_{14}	—	September 17, 2012	Mount Lemmon	Mount Lemmon Survey	·	1.0 km	MPC · JPL
708944	2012 SY_{19}	—	August 26, 2012	Haleakala	Pan-STARRS 1	·	2.6 km	MPC · JPL
708945	2012 SC_{29}	—	September 3, 2008	Kitt Peak	Spacewatch	(5)	800 m	MPC · JPL
708946	2012 SP_{36}	—	September 2, 2008	Kitt Peak	Spacewatch	·	820 m	MPC · JPL
708947	2012 SH_{37}	—	September 18, 2012	Mount Lemmon	Mount Lemmon Survey	KOR	920 m	MPC · JPL
708948	2012 SD_{40}	—	January 23, 2006	Kitt Peak	Spacewatch	·	1.4 km	MPC · JPL
708949	2012 SC_{52}	—	November 8, 2009	Mount Lemmon	Mount Lemmon Survey	·	660 m	MPC · JPL
708950	2012 SM_{61}	—	August 27, 2008	San Marcello	San Marcello	NYS	1.0 km	MPC · JPL
708951	2012 SW_{61}	—	September 19, 2012	Mount Lemmon	Mount Lemmon Survey	·	830 m	MPC · JPL
708952	2012 SW_{65}	—	October 17, 2003	Apache Point	SDSS Collaboration	·	1.2 km	MPC · JPL
708953	2012 SU_{66}	—	September 23, 2008	Mount Lemmon	Mount Lemmon Survey	·	1.1 km	MPC · JPL
708954	2012 SO_{69}	—	July 28, 2011	Haleakala	Pan-STARRS 1	EUN	1.3 km	MPC · JPL
708955	2012 SM_{70}	—	September 19, 2012	Mount Lemmon	Mount Lemmon Survey	·	1.3 km	MPC · JPL
708956	2012 SW_{72}	—	August 27, 2016	Haleakala	Pan-STARRS 1	·	880 m	MPC · JPL
708957	2012 SE_{73}	—	September 15, 2006	Kitt Peak	Spacewatch	THM	2.1 km	MPC · JPL
708958	2012 SZ_{86}	—	September 21, 2012	Mount Lemmon	Mount Lemmon Survey	·	2.3 km	MPC · JPL
708959	2012 SO_{88}	—	September 16, 2012	Catalina	CSS	MAR	810 m	MPC · JPL
708960	2012 SR_{89}	—	September 22, 2012	Kitt Peak	Spacewatch	HOF	1.9 km	MPC · JPL
708961	2012 SB_{91}	—	September 25, 2012	Mount Lemmon	Mount Lemmon Survey	526	2.2 km	MPC · JPL
708962	2012 SC_{91}	—	September 26, 2012	Mount Lemmon	Mount Lemmon Survey	·	1.0 km	MPC · JPL
708963	2012 SX_{103}	—	September 20, 2012	Mount Lemmon	Mount Lemmon Survey	L5	7.9 km	MPC · JPL
708964	2012 SQ_{104}	—	September 21, 2012	Mount Lemmon	Mount Lemmon Survey	VER	2.0 km	MPC · JPL
708965	2012 TA_{2}	—	October 4, 2012	Nogales	M. Schwartz, P. R. Holvorcem	·	1.3 km	MPC · JPL
708966	2012 TS_{6}	—	August 25, 2004	Kitt Peak	Spacewatch	·	1.2 km	MPC · JPL
708967	2012 TA_{9}	—	September 16, 2012	Kitt Peak	Spacewatch	·	930 m	MPC · JPL
708968	2012 TU_{22}	—	September 15, 2012	ESA OGS	ESA OGS	·	1.2 km	MPC · JPL
708969	2012 TH_{25}	—	March 25, 2003	Palomar	NEAT	H	440 m	MPC · JPL
708970	2012 TL_{34}	—	October 7, 2012	Oukaïmeden	C. Rinner	·	1.0 km	MPC · JPL
708971	2012 TN_{35}	—	September 17, 2012	Kitt Peak	Spacewatch	·	1.5 km	MPC · JPL
708972	2012 TB_{39}	—	October 8, 2012	Mount Lemmon	Mount Lemmon Survey	HNS	740 m	MPC · JPL
708973	2012 TY_{45}	—	October 31, 2008	Mount Lemmon	Mount Lemmon Survey	·	1.3 km	MPC · JPL
708974	2012 TS_{46}	—	October 8, 2008	Kitt Peak	Spacewatch	·	880 m	MPC · JPL
708975	2012 TM_{47}	—	November 3, 2008	Mount Lemmon	Mount Lemmon Survey	·	1.2 km	MPC · JPL
708976	2012 TY_{51}	—	October 8, 2012	Haleakala	Pan-STARRS 1	L5	7.8 km	MPC · JPL
708977	2012 TD_{65}	—	October 8, 2012	Mount Lemmon	Mount Lemmon Survey	·	620 m	MPC · JPL
708978	2012 TT_{67}	—	October 8, 2012	Nogales	M. Schwartz, P. R. Holvorcem	VER	3.0 km	MPC · JPL
708979	2012 TD_{68}	—	October 8, 2012	Mount Lemmon	Mount Lemmon Survey	·	1.7 km	MPC · JPL
708980	2012 TM_{70}	—	October 8, 2012	Haleakala	Pan-STARRS 1	·	1.1 km	MPC · JPL
708981	2012 TZ_{70}	—	October 9, 2008	Mount Lemmon	Mount Lemmon Survey	·	1.1 km	MPC · JPL
708982	2012 TU_{74}	—	October 9, 2012	Haleakala	Pan-STARRS 1	GEF	870 m	MPC · JPL
708983	2012 TN_{92}	—	October 6, 2008	Mount Lemmon	Mount Lemmon Survey	·	870 m	MPC · JPL
708984	2012 TQ_{92}	—	October 1, 2008	Kitt Peak	Spacewatch	(5)	950 m	MPC · JPL
708985	2012 TC_{100}	—	October 8, 2012	Mayhill-ISON	L. Elenin	·	1.3 km	MPC · JPL
708986	2012 TH_{108}	—	August 22, 2003	Palomar	NEAT	·	1.5 km	MPC · JPL
708987	2012 TR_{110}	—	October 23, 2008	Kitt Peak	Spacewatch	·	1.4 km	MPC · JPL
708988	2012 TJ_{111}	—	October 10, 2012	Mount Lemmon	Mount Lemmon Survey	·	1.5 km	MPC · JPL
708989	2012 TL_{113}	—	September 17, 2012	Kitt Peak	Spacewatch	·	2.1 km	MPC · JPL
708990	2012 TQ_{113}	—	September 25, 2012	Kitt Peak	Spacewatch	·	710 m	MPC · JPL
708991	2012 TD_{114}	—	October 10, 2012	Mount Lemmon	Mount Lemmon Survey	·	1.6 km	MPC · JPL
708992	2012 TX_{114}	—	June 10, 2011	Mount Lemmon	Mount Lemmon Survey	EUN	770 m	MPC · JPL
708993	2012 TM_{121}	—	October 10, 2012	Mount Lemmon	Mount Lemmon Survey	EOS	1.4 km	MPC · JPL
708994	2012 TM_{126}	—	September 14, 2007	Kitt Peak	Spacewatch	·	1.5 km	MPC · JPL
708995	2012 TR_{127}	—	September 24, 2008	Mount Lemmon	Mount Lemmon Survey	·	1.3 km	MPC · JPL
708996	2012 TC_{132}	—	October 9, 2012	Kitt Peak	Spacewatch	·	1.0 km	MPC · JPL
708997	2012 TY_{139}	—	October 9, 2012	Haleakala	Pan-STARRS 1	H	350 m	MPC · JPL
708998	2012 TA_{149}	—	October 10, 2008	Mount Lemmon	Mount Lemmon Survey	·	840 m	MPC · JPL
708999	2012 TR_{149}	—	October 29, 2008	Kitt Peak	Spacewatch	·	1.1 km	MPC · JPL
709000	2012 TX_{155}	—	February 12, 2009	Calar Alto	F. Hormuth, Datson, J. C.	·	2.4 km	MPC · JPL

back to top

== Meaning of names ==
As minor planet discoveries are confirmed, they are given a permanent number by the IAU's Minor Planet Center (MPC), and the discoverers can then submit names for them, following the IAU's naming conventions. The list below concerns those minor planets in the specified number-range that have received names, and explains the meanings of those names.

Official naming citations of newly named small Solar System bodies are approved and published in a bulletin by IAU's Working Group for Small Bodies Nomenclature (WGSBN). Before May 2021, citations were published in MPC's Minor Planet Circulars for many decades. Recent citations can also be found on the JPL Small-Body Database (SBDB). Until his death in 2016, German astronomer Lutz D. Schmadel compiled these citations into the Dictionary of Minor Planet Names (DMP) and regularly updated the collection.

Based on Paul Herget's The Names of the Minor Planets, Schmadel also researched the unclear origin of numerous asteroids, most of which had been named prior to World War II. This article incorporates text from this source, which is in the public domain: SBDB New namings may only be added to this list below after official publication as the preannouncement of names is condemned. The WGSBN publishes a comprehensive guideline for the naming rules of non-cometary small Solar System bodies.

Named minor planet	Provisional	This minor planet was named for...	Ref · Catalog
708341 Fredjudson	2012 BM_{34}	Charles Frederick Judson (born 1945), Canadian professor of political science at the University of Alberta.	IAU · 708341
708722 Timișoara	2012 HW_{96}	Timișoara is the capital city of Timiș County, Romania.	IAU · 708722
708658 Turowicz	2012 GJ_{42}	Jerzy Turowicz, Polish journalist, long-time editor-in-chief of the magazine Tygodnik Powszechny.	IAU · 708658
