= Lukasz Jogalla =

Polish-American cinematographer (born 1961)

- Łukasz Jogałła
- Born: Łukasz Jerzy August Jogałła; Kraków, Polish People's Republic
- Other names: Lucas Jogalla; Luckasz Jogalla
- Occupation: Cinematographer
- Years active: 1987–present
- Spouse: Magdalena Deskur (m. 1988)
- Children: 2, including Pico Alexander
- Relatives: Jerzy Turowicz (grandfather)

Lukasz Jogalla is a Polish-American cinematographer.

== Biography ==
He was born in Kraków and moved to the United States with his future wife in 1984. He has been married to Magdalena Deskur since 1988, and they have two children, one of whom is actor Pico Alexander.

He is the son of Elżbieta Maria Stefania (née Turowicz) and actor Jerzy Jogałła. His maternal grandfather was journalist and magazine editor Jerzy Turowicz.

== Filmography ==
Year	Film	Other notes
2021	The Harder They Fall	Director of photography: second unit
2020	Lovecraft Country	Director of photography: second unit - 2 episodes
2020	Mulan	Director of photography: second unit
2019	Jumanji: The Next Level	Director of photography: second unit
2019	The Irishman	Director of photography: second unit
2019	Men in Black: International	Director of photography: second unit
2018	Tomb Raider	Director of photography: second unit
2017	The Upside	Director of photography: second unit
2017	The Only Living Boy in New York	Director of photography: second unit
2017	Logan	Director of photography: second unit
2016	Silence	Director of photography: second unit
2016	The Magnificent Seven	Director of photography: second unit
2016	Paterson	Director of photography: second unit
2015	Goosebumps	Director of photography: second unit
2015	The Intern	Director of photography: second unit
2015	The Divergent Series: Insurgent	Director of photography: second unit
2014	The Equalizer	Director of photography: second unit
2014	Deliver Us From Evil	Director of photography: second unit
2014	22 Jump Street	Director of photography: second unit
2014	Noah	Director of photography: second unit
2014	Jack Ryan: Shadow Recruit	Director of photography: second unit
2013	Now You See Me	Director of photography: second unit
2013	Dead Man Down	Director of photography: additional photography
2013	Broken City	Director of photography: second unit
2012	21 Jump Street	Director of photography: second unit
2012	Premium Rush	Director of photography: second unit
2012	Man on a Ledge	Director of photography: second unit
2011	Tower Heist	Director of photography: second unit
2011	Margaret	Camera operator
2011	The Smurfs	Camera operator
2011	Mr. Popper's Penguins	Director of photography: second unit
2011	The Adjustment Bureau	Director of photography: second unit
2010	Boardwalk Empire	Camera operator: "a" camera - 1 episode
2010	The Tempest	Camera operator
2010	Salt	Camera operator
2010	Edge of Darkness	Camera operator
2009	Old Dogs	Director of photography: second unit
2009	Zombieland	Director of photography: second unit
2009	Kings	Camera operator: "b" camera - 1 episode
2009	Bride Wars	Camera operator
2008	Ghost Town	Director of photography: second unit
2008	Synecdoche, New York	Camera operator
2008	The Accidental Husband	Camera operator
2008	Shine a Light	Camera operator
2007	I Am Legend	Camera operator: second unit
2007	Anamorph	Director of photography: second unit
2007	The Life Before Her Eyes	Camera operator
2007	Margot at the Wedding	Camera operator
2006	Fanaa	Director of photography: second unit
2005	Æon Flux	Camera operator
2004	Alfie	Camera operator
2004	Ray	Director of photography: second unit
2004	Secret Window	Camera operator
2001	Kate & Leopold	Camera operator
2001	Hearts in Atlantis	Camera operator
2000	Proof of Life	Director of photography: second unit
1999	Analyze This	Camera operator
1999	The Sopranos	Camera operator: "a" camera - 1 episode
1998	Rounders	Camera operator
1998	Lulu on the Bridge	Camera operator
1998	Sex and the City	Camera operator - 1 episode
1997	Cop Land	Camera operator
1997	Commandments	Additional camera operator
1993	The Execution Protocol	Assistant camera
1991	Desperately Seeking Roger	Assistant camera
1987	My Demon Lover	Second assistant camera
