= Wojciech Smoczyński =

Polish linguist

Wojciech Sławomir Smoczyński (born March 12, 1945, in Głowno near Łowicz) is a Polish linguist. He is a tenured professor at the Department of General and Indo-European linguistics at Jagiellonian University, and since 1996 also the head of the Department of Indo-European Studies.

From 1962 to 1967 he studied Slavic philology, Lithuanian and Gothic at Warsaw University. In 1977 he defended his thesis at Jagiellonian University. In 2000 he received the title of professor, and subsequently full professorship in 2002.

He is the author of over 200 articles, five monographs and the Etymological Dictionary of the Lithuanian Language (Polish: Słownik etymologiczny języka litewskiego), as well as the editor of two conference proceedings.

He received an honorary doctorate from the University of Vilnius.

== Literature ==
- Employees of the Department of General and Indo-European linguistics at the Jagiellonian University
