= Andrzej Świetlicki =

Polish politician (1915–1940)

- Born: 19 April 1915; Congress Poland
- Died: 21 June 1940 (aged 25); Kampinos Forest, Masovian Voivodeship, German-occupied Poland
- Cause of death: Execution by firing squad
- Occupation: Founding member of the National Radical Organization

Andrzej Świetlicki (19 April 1915 – 21 June 1940) was a Polish politician, a member of the far-right National Radical Movement "Falanga". After the 1939 German invasion of Poland, in October 1939 he formed the collaborationist National Radical Organization (Narodowa Organizacja Radykalna). After a few months of collaboration with the Germans (Abwehr and Gestapo), and the takeover of power by the civil administration of the General Government, Hitler issued a ban on cooperation with political organizations in Poland. The NOR was deprived of protection and cooperation from the Nazis. In May 1940, Świetlicki was arrested and imprisoned in Pawiak. On 21 June 1940, he was executed in the Palmiry massacre.

Two other NOR activists, Wojciech Kwasieborski and Tadeusz Lipkowski, were executed with Świetlicki. Consequently, the NOR was dissolved in June 1940. Stanisław Trzeciak, the other founding member of the NOR, was executed by the Germans in 1944.

== Biography ==
=== Interwar period ===
==== Early life and beginnings of political and militant activities ====
Andrzej Świetlicki was born on April 19, 1915, in Warsaw. His parents were Stanisław Ksawery and Michalina (maiden name Wróblewska). His father was a teacher and the director of the Warsaw Private Male Gymnasium of the Mazovian Land Society. Andrzej also began attending this educational center in 1924. According to the memoirs of Gustaw Potworowski, who supervised the Camp of Great Poland (OPW) gymnasium group at this school, it was then that Świetlicki became involved in the Nationalist movement.

From 1933, as a free student, he participated in classes at the Faculty of Humanities at the University of Warsaw, and after passing his high school diploma in 1936, he was already a full-fledged student at the Faculty of Law. However, he did not complete his studies as a result of his increasing involvement in political activities. This activity in 1933 resulted, among other things, in Świetlicki being expelled from his studies after a fight with a member of the Youth Legion. In the same year, after the Sanation authorities dissolved the OWP, he joined the Youth Section of the SN. There he came into contact with Bolesław Piasecki, who at the time supervised its Warsaw structures.

At that time, Piasecki set up the so-called Miscellaneous Universities. This was a group composed of a mixture of students and lumpenproletariat with a militant character. After Piasecki and his group parted ways with the SN, this militia was taken over by the newly formed ONR. Its most famous action was the March 14, 1934 assault and beating of the founder of the University of Warsaw Historical Institute, Professor Marceli Handelsman, who openly opposed attempts to “Aryanize” university life. In connection with this attack, Świetlicki was arrested for the first time.

==== Important activist and militant of the "Falanga" ====
When another split occurred, this time in the ONR, he again showed loyalty to Piasecki, moving to the RNR Falanga. In the new movement, he occupied himself primarily with the creation of autonomous militias, i.e., independent of the official Falangist ones such as the National Combat Organization (NOB).

From 1937 to 1939 he was arrested at least seven times. The reason most was often the conduct of illegal activities (the RNR Falanga was an illegal organization) participation in anti-Jewish incidents and pogroms (e.g. in Przytyk on March 9, 1936) and involvement in assaults and bombings. The most serious of these arrests was related to the shooting from a cab of a member of the rival nationalist organization ONR "ABC" Adam Koszacki in September 1937. He was allegedly involved in an earlier attack on one of Falanga's main activists, Wojciech Wasiutyński. During searches and arrests including Świetlicki's, police found revolvers, bombs, rubber truncheons, rods and crowbars.

Due to militant activities, Andrzej Świetlicki's position in the RNR Falanga grew. From the very moment the formation was established, he was among its leading activists. This may be evidenced by the fact that as early as 1935 he was a participant in the organizational convention in Kąty at the estate of Wanda Malinowska's father, an acquaintance of Wojciech Kwasieborski. This event was attended by a small group of 20 people, who later formed the core of the RNR throughout its existence. In a trial in November 1936, which followed, as the defendants claimed before the court, a tourist trip, Świetlicki received a sentence of 1.5 years in prison. He did not serve his sentence, however, as an amnesty was declared.

On February 7, 1937, the Falanga published the Principles of the National Radical Program from the color of the covers called the Green Program. The document was signed by 14 people, including Andrzej Świetlicki. The fact that Świetlicki, who up to that point had been known for his militant activities and was not one of the movement's ideologues like the Reutt brothers, for example, shows his considerable position within the Falanga.

==== Mystery of being a German agent and further activities ====
At the end of that year he was sent to Łódź together with Kazimierz Halaburda and Olgierd Szpakowski with the mission of reconstituting the local Falanga structures based on old members and new from the Polish Fascist Front. This attempt to resuscitate the RNR in the area, however, was not successful. His stay in Łódź, however, is related to one of the mysteries surrounding Świetlicki. According to Edmund Janiec's relation in Andrzej Micewski's work, it was at this time that he was said to have made contact with National Socialist-oriented industrialists of German origin in order to raise funds for the Movement's activities. This could have been the case, since the Falanga, if only because it was an illegal organization, had limited means of raising money.

Świetlicki continued to act mainly as a militiaman. After commanding a university group of militiamen, he became, by Piasecki's decision, head of the Warsaw District of the RNR. One of his first actions was to lead pickets in front of Jewish bookstores during the period when school classes began in 1937. As Falanga reported at the time, some 400 people participated on the nationalist side in the incidents, which involved violence against both Jews and Poles. In the same year, he was active in an attempt by the Falangist to take over the National Worker's Party, which had existed since 1905. This was an attempt to legitimize itself under a different banner. Accordingly, the RNR applied to the Sanation's authorities for legalization, and Andrzej Świetlicki was to serve as secretary if the initiative met with approval. Ultimately, nothing came of it.

One of the leaders of the Labor Party (SP), Karol Popiel, referring to the attempt to disrupt the SP's unification congress, noted that it was led by Świetlicki, a trusted Bolesław Piasecki and used by him for the most risky actions. The legalization attempt, albeit unsuccessful, left its mark in the nomenclature. For from then on, the RNR Falanga often presented itself in some regions as the NPR, except that the word Workers' was replaced by the word Radical. This was confirmed when Piasecki created the Committee of Agreement of National Radical Organizations on February 27, 1938, bringing together leaders of nationalist structures from all over the country. The Committee also included Andrzej Świetlicki as head of the Warsaw district NPR. Here for the first time appears the abbreviation NOR (National Radical Organization) associating at that time several Young Sections of the SN from Pomerania, which joined the Committee under this name on October 18, 1938. It is interesting to note that the security authorities of the Second Republic, when describing the leadership of the RNR, listed Andrzej Świetlicki as the main head of the NPR. He also served as the Movement's general secretary until the outbreak of war.

=== Second World War ===
==== Collaboration attempt ====
With the invasion of Poland by Nazi Germany, a period of Andrzej Świetlicki's life began that is most questionable and disputed. It concerns his creation of the National Radical Organization under the umbrella of the Wehrmacht in early October 1939. The name National Revolutionary Camp also functions in the literature. This was an attempt to obtain an understanding between German military commanders and at least part of the former Falanga members on the grounds of anti-communism and anti-Semitism. In addition to former members of the RNR, the organization included the group of the "Pochodnia" Association, headed by Tadeusz Podgorski and Erazm Samborski, and, as it were, individually, the well-known pre-war nationalists and anti-Semites Prof. Zygmunt Cybichowski and Rev. Stanisław Trzeciak. For the use of NOR, the Germans donated several premises in Warsaw, including Julian Tuwim's former apartment at 7 Mazowiecka Street, as well as the headquarters of the Young Poland Association at 20 Ujazdowskie Avenue. It was there that the meetings of the organization led by Świetlicki were held, According to Piotr Zychowicz, these meetings were also attended by Wehrmacht officers. On the other hand, Zygmunt Przetakiewicz recalled his conversation with Bolesław Piasecki from that period, in which the latter reported that the meetings ended with the singing of the Rota ("The Oath") and the Poland Is Not Yet Lost.

During his period of pro-German activity, he managed to publish only one leaflet, the content of which was reproduced from memory by Wojciech Sznarbachowski. It was supposed to state:

Nation of Poland! Through the fault of Sanation, Poland suffered a terrible defeat and lost its independence and western lands. But all is not lost. The Polish army can be rebuilt to take part in the inevitable war against Soviet communism. The lands gained in the east will restore to us our territories seized by the USSR, and others more to the east will be compensation for lost Pomerania, Silesia and Poznań as well as compensation for war losses. We will use confiscated Jewish property to finance the reconstruction of Poland and its new army. Compatriots! Join the NOR! Give us the opportunity to rebuild the homeland and create a Great Poland!

NOR's activities came to a halt after October 26, 1939, when the administration of occupied Poland from the Wehrmacht was taken over by civilian authorities headed by Hans Frank. However, it continued to be an organization that was at least tolerated by the Germans. General Tokarzewski-Karaszewicz reported to General Sosnkowski about its activities, writing:

On their part, however, they (the Germans) are making attempts to spread National Socialist influence in Polish society, both by supporting ideologically similar political circles (a certain faction of the National Radical Camp) and by organizing a National Socialist labor union.

This report is dated January 9, 1940, so even then those Polish nationalists who were ready to cooperate with the Germans could count on reciprocity. Poles were useful, for example, in carrying out German plans against the Jews which, in Warsaw found expression in the so-called Easter Pogrom, in which members of the organization led by Andrzej Świetlicki participated to in some way. Later they also became redundant because the idea behind NOR did not find wider resonance in Polish society.

==== Failed collaboration and death ====
In April 1940, Adolf Hitler categorically forbade the Wehrmacht to interfere in politics in occupied Poland. On April 10, 1940, Colonel Rowecki wrote to General Sosnkowski:

Last week numerous arrests were made among men involved in anti-Jewish excesses.

As part of this German action, Andrzej Świetlicki was also arrested on March 30. However, on April 18, the NOR leader was released from prison. He ended up there again on May 8 and remained there until the tragic end, i.e. the night of June 20–21, 1940, when he was shot in a mass execution in Palmiry as part of the AB action. He rests in the Palmiry Cemetery grave number XIII/51.
