= Trzeciak =

Trzeciak is a Polish surname. Notable people with the surname include:

- Mirosław Trzeciak (born 1968), Polish footballer
- Stanisław Trzeciak (1873–1944), Polish priest, social activist, and academic
