= Fascist symbolism =

Use of certain images and symbols which are designed to represent aspects of fascism

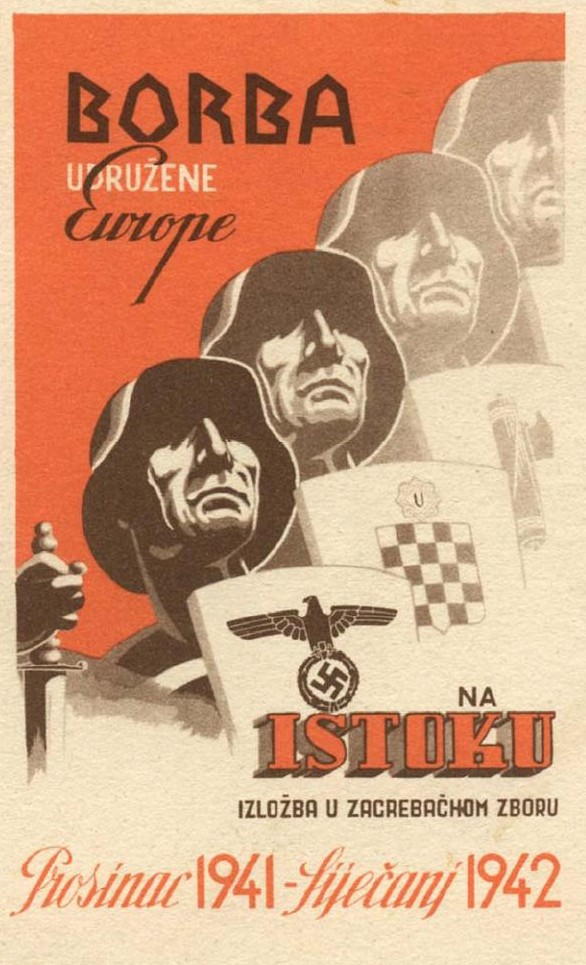
World War II-era Croatian propaganda poster, depicting the Italian fasces and the German swastika alongside the Ustaše symbol.

Fascist symbolism is the use of certain images and symbols which are designed to represent aspects of fascism. These include national symbols of historical importance, goals, and political policies. The best-known are the fasces, which was the original symbol of fascism, and the swastika of Nazism.

== Symbols ==
Organized fascist movements have militarist-appearing uniforms for their members; use historical national symbols as symbols of their movement; and use orchestrated rallies for propaganda purposes. Fascist movements are led by a "Leader" (e.g. Duce, Führer, Caudillo, Conducator) who is publicly idolized in propaganda as the nation's saviour. A number of fascist movements use a straight-armed salute.

The use of symbols, graphics, and other artifacts created by fascist, authoritarian, and totalitarian governments has been noted as a key aspect of their propaganda. Most fascist movements adopted symbols of Ancient Roman or Greek origin, for example, the German use of Roman standards during rallies and the Italian adoption of the fasces symbol. The Spanish Falange took its name from the Spanish word for the Greek phalanx.

As the Italian Fascists adapted elements of their ethnic heritage to fuel a sense of Nationalism by use of symbolism, so did Nazi Germany. Turn-of-the-century German-Austrian mystic and author Guido von List was a big influence on Reichsführer-SS Heinrich Himmler, who introduced various ancient Germanic symbols (filtered through von List's writings) more thoroughly into the SS, including the stylized double Sig Rune (von List's then-contemporary Armanen rune version of the ancient sowilo rune) for the organization itself.

=== Fasces ===

The Roman fasces, also called fascio littorio, gave fascism both its name and foundational emblem. In fascism, the symbol of the fasces represents strength through unity: individual rods that could be broken separately became unbreakable when bound together. The choice of the fasces to represents the movement was also tied to Italy’s Roman legacy, as the fascist state presented itself as the legitimate heir of the Roman Empire. In ancient Rome, the fasces represented a symbol of power and authority, carried by lictors who accompanied senior Roman magistrates.

The fasces was widely used by a wide range of political movements prior to 1914, including liberal of leftist groups. the symbol was later adopted by Benito Mussolini as the emblem of his Italian Fasces of Combat (later renamed the National Fascist Party in 1921), founded in 1919 in Milan. In Italy, the term fascio constituted a common political expression to designate a “group” or “association”, as it was used by the Fasci Siciliani in the 1890s, or the Fasci d'Azione Rivoluzionaria during World War I with the goal of promoting Italian intervention. Since Mussolini’s rise to power and the establishment of Fascist Italy, the fasces became synonymous with fascism in Italy and globally, as the image appeared on party insignia, military standards, public buildings, coins, and postage stamps throughout the years of the Fascist regime.

Outside of Italy, the fasces also enjoyed usage from other fascist parties in Europe. In Denmark, the fasces was used by a few groups inspired by Italian fascism in the early 1920s. In the United Kingdom, the fasces was also used as the main emblem of Oswald Mosley’s British Union of Fascists and the Imperial Fascist League during their early years. According to Mosley himself, the fasces was “a symbol used in Britain for the last 2,000 years and are to be found on most of our great monuments. The symbol was brought to Britain by our Roman ancestors, who were here for four centuries and their stock remained for ever”. In 1935, as the BUF distanced from fascism to embrace Nazism, the group dropped the fasces and replaced it with the flash and circle as a regional fascist symbol, while the IFL replaced it with the swastika by the time the Nazis rose to power in Germany.

Other symbols used by the Italian Fascists included the aquila, the Capitoline Wolf, and the SPQR motto, each related to Italy's ancient Roman cultural history, which the Fascists attempted to resurrect.

=== Swastika ===

The right-facing swastika (German: Hakenkreuz, "hooked cross") became the defining symbol of National Socialism in Germany, being adopted during the interwar period as the main symbol of the Nazi movement. During the early twentieth-century, as early as 1910, the swastika was used as a symbol by German nationalists and the Völkisch movement, presented as an ancient Aryan sun symbol and a badge of the supposed racial superiority of the Germanic peoples. Following World War I, the swastika was used by the Freikorps of the Ehrhardt Brigade as a motif on their helmets. In 1920, the swastika was officially adopted by the Nazi Party as its main emblem, appearing on the party flag designed by Adolf Hitler himself — a red field bearing a white disc at its center, within which the black swastika was set at a forty-five-degree angle. Shortly after Hitler’s appointment as Chancellor in March 1933, the party flag was hoisted alongside the Imperial tricolor flag. In 1935, as part of the Nuremberg laws, the NSDAP flag – with the white disk and swastika slightly offset from centre – was adopted as the sole national flag of Germany.

The swastika’s use as a nationalist symbol was not exclusive to German National Socialism, as it also served as symbol of Russian fascism. The swastika as a fascist symbol was firstly adopted by Russian émigré circles and nationalist organizations during the interwar period. In 1931, the swastika was adopted as the official emblem of the All-Russian Fascist Party, formed under the leadership of Konstantin Rodzaevskii in Manchuria. In the Fourth Party Congress in 1939, following a dispute between the two leading Russian fascist figures —Konstantin Rodzaevskii and Mikhail Alekseevich Matkovskii— the later demanded to cut all ties with the Nazis and the removal of the swastika as the party emblem, as he believed Hitler’s interests were against the Slavs'.

Following Germany’s defeat in World War II and the consequent denazification of the country, the Allied governments removed Nazi propaganda and symbols and criminalized the dissemination of such, including the swastika. Subsequent German governments continued the ban on Nazi symbols and propaganda. Although the swastika was a popular symbol in art prior to the regimental use by Nazi Germany and has a long heritage in many other cultures throughout history, the meaning of the swastika in the West has remained intrinsically associated with the atrocities committed under the Nazi regime, including the Holocaust.

=== Yoke and arrows ===

The fascist Falange in Spain utilized the yoke and arrows as their symbol. It historically served as the symbol of the shield of the monarchy of Ferdinand and Isabella and subsequent Catholic monarchs, representing a united Spain and the "symbol of the heroic virtues of the race". The original uniform of the Falangistas was the blue shirt – derived from the blue overalls of industrial workers – which was later combined with the red beret of the Carlists to represent their merger by Franco.

=== Other symbols ===
Symbol of the British Union of Fascists

Symbol of the Hungarian Arrow Cross Party

Symbol of the Croatian Ustaše

Flag of the Silver Legion of America

Symbol of the Norwegian Nasjonal Samling

Flag of the Golden Dawn (Greece)

Celtic cross on a neo-Nazi flag

Flag of the Afrikaner Weerstandsbeweging

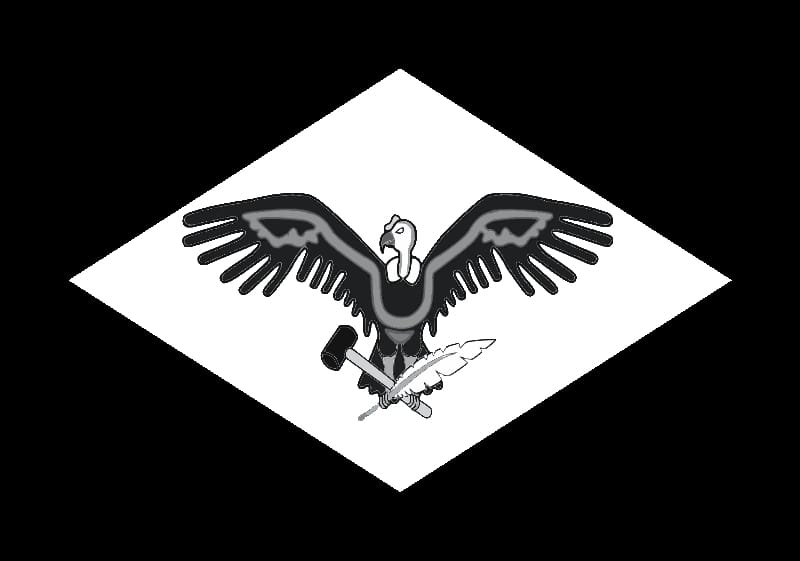
Flag of the Nationalist Liberation Alliance

Many other fascist movements did not win power or were relatively minor regimes in comparison and their symbolism is not well-remembered today in many parts of the world, although the BUF's Flash and Circle was later used by the non-fascist People's Action Party of Singapore.

In alphabetical order by nation:

- In Argentina, the Nationalist Liberation Alliance, used the Andean condor.
- Austria's Fatherland's Front, that ruled the country from 1933 to 1938, used the crutch cross as its symbol.
- Lightning bolts were a common symbol of Sir Oswald Mosley's British Union of Fascists, appearing on uniforms, newspaper mastheads, badges and on the movement's flags. The symbol completely replaced the fasces used from 1932 to 1935 with the adoption of the Flash and Circle.
- The Brazilian Integralist Action used an upper case sigma (Σ), to represent the summation of all things under the State.
- The symbol of the Bulgarian national-socialist Ratnik movements was a sun cross named "Bogar".
- The symbol of the Croatian Ustaše movement was capital letter U with the flaming grenade and the Croatian coat of arms.
- A prominent symbol of the Greek 4th of August Regime was the Labrys/Pelekys, the double-headed axe which Ioannis Metaxas thought to be the oldest symbol of all Hellenic civilizations.
- Greece's far-right, ultra-nationalist Golden Dawn Party uses a flag depicting a meandros in a style and color scheme reminiscent of the Nazi swastika.
- The symbol of Hungary's fascistic Arrow Cross Party was the Arrow Cross.
- The National Socialist Movement in the Netherlands (NSB) used the Wolfsangel as its main symbol.
- The symbol of the Norwegian Nasjonal Samling was a golden/yellow sun cross on red background.
- The symbol of Salazar's Portuguese Estado Novo regime was a stylized version of the Christ Cross and shield found on the national flag to distinguish its rivals in the Movimento Nacional-Sindicalista used the Order of Christ Cross.
- The symbol of the Romanian Iron Guard was a triple cross (a variant of the triple parted and fretted) – three parallel verticals intersected with three parallel horizontals, usually in black; it was meant to represent prison bars, as a badge of martyrdom. It was sometimes deemed the Archangel Michael Cross, after the patron saint of the movement.
- The symbol of the Silver Legion of America was a silver flag with a scarlet letter L.
- The Russian Movement Against Illegal Immigration used the black-colored road sign "Stop Prohibited" (similar to the swastika) as their main symbol.
- The quasi-Fascist Yugoslav ZBOR used a green shield with a blade of wheat on it, with a sword crossing the shield.

==== Finland ====
Finnish fascist Lapua Movement used the logo of a bear-rider with a club, referencing the coat of arms of Lapua and the Cudgel War peasant uprising. The leader of the movement Vihtori Kosola even claimed to be a descendant of Klaus Fleming, one of the main figures of the war. After Lapua Movement was banned for a failed uprising of its own, its successor Patriotic People's Movement re-used the symbol with minimal alterations.

Symbol of the Lapua Movement

Several neo-Fascist organizations like the Blue-and-Black Movement use the pagan Kalevalaic "Hands of the runesigners" as their symbol.

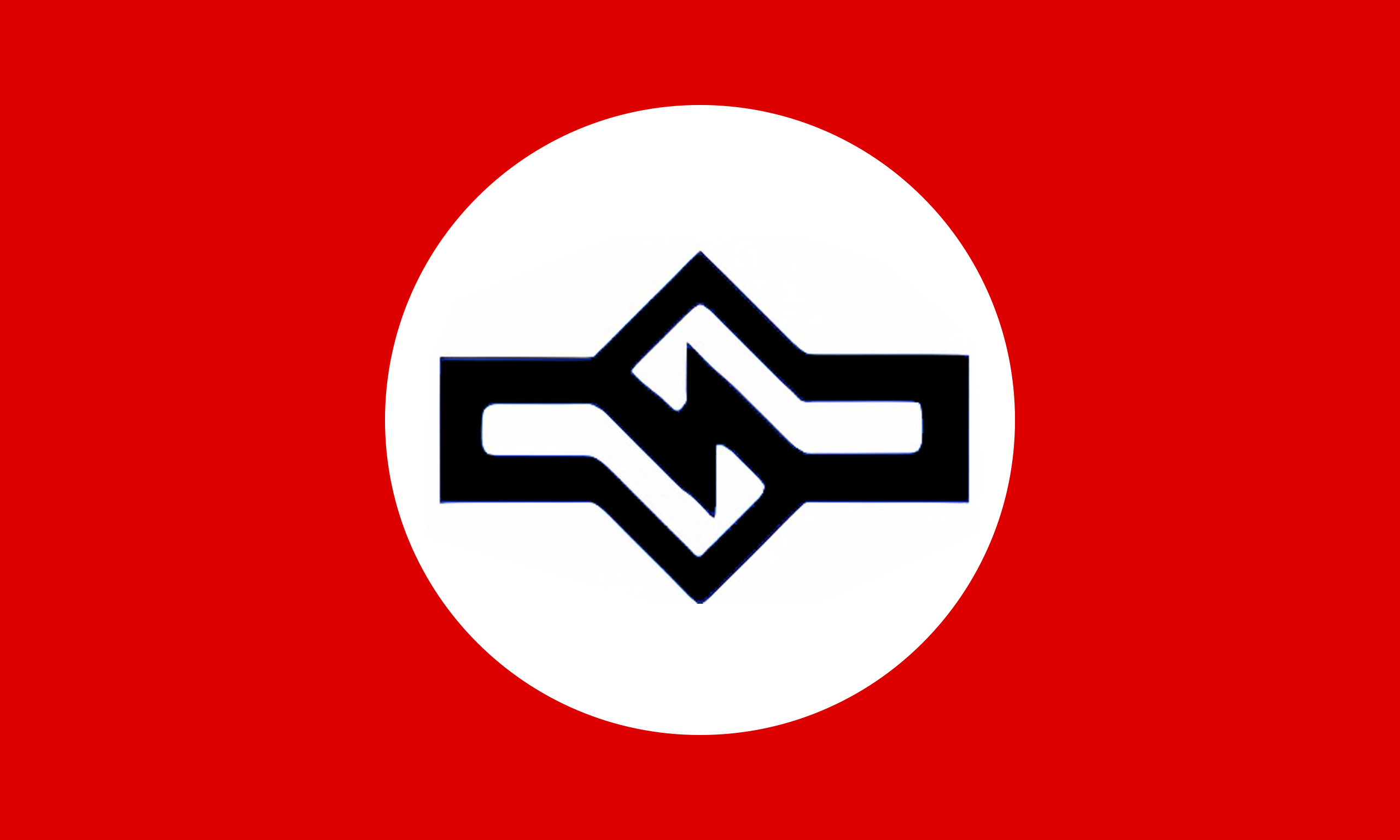
Symbol of the National Union Council

==== Poland ====
Mieczyk Chrobrego

Version of the Mieczyk Chrobrego used by the National Party

Older far-right organizations in Poland, such as the National Party (SN) and the Camp of Great Poland used the Mieczyk Chrobrego symbol of Bolesław the Brave. A modern interpretation of the symbol is used by the All-Polish Youth party.

Older version of the Falanga symbol

Modern interpretation of the Falanga symbol

Organizations espousing National-Radicalism (National Radical Camp (ONR); SN) have used the Falanga symbol to identify themselves. A modern interpretation of the symbol is used by the National Rebirth of Poland and the modern incarnation of the ONR.

Organizations such as Zadruga and Niklot have also used the Toporzeł symbol. A variant of this symbol exists called the Topokrzyż, which replaces the eagle's head with a cross, was to identify shops that were not owned by Jews.

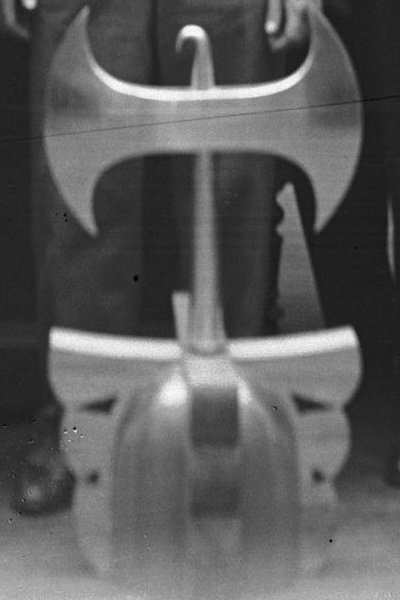
The Toporzeł created by Stanisław Szukalski

== Militarist uniforms with nationalist insignia ==
Organized fascist movements typically use military-like uniforms with the symbol of their movement on them.

In Italy, the Italian Fascist movement in 1919 wore black military-like uniforms and was nicknamed Blackshirts. In power, uniforms during the Fascist era extended to both the party and the military which typically bore fasces or an eagle clutching a fasces on their caps or on the left arm section of the uniform.

In Germany, the fascist Nazi movement was similar to the Italian Fascists in that they initially used a specifically colored uniform for their movement, the tan-brown colored uniform of the SA paramilitary group earned the group and the Nazis themselves the nickname of the Brownshirts. The Nazis used the swastika for their uniforms and copied the Italian Fascists' uniforms, with an eagle clutching a wreathed swastika instead of a fasces, and a Nazi flag arm sash on the left arm section of the uniform for party members.

Other fascist countries largely copied the symbolism of the Italian Fascists and German Nazis for their movements. Like them, their uniforms looked typically like military uniforms with Nationalist-type insignia of the movement. The Spanish Falange adopted dark blue shirts for their party members, symbolizing Spanish workers, many of whom wore blue shirts. Berets were also used, representing their Carlist supporters. The Spanish Blue Division expeditionary volunteers sent to the Eastern Front of WWII in (relatively indirect) support of the Germans likewise wore blue shirts, berets and their army trousers.

== Slogans ==
=== Credere, obbedire, combattere ===
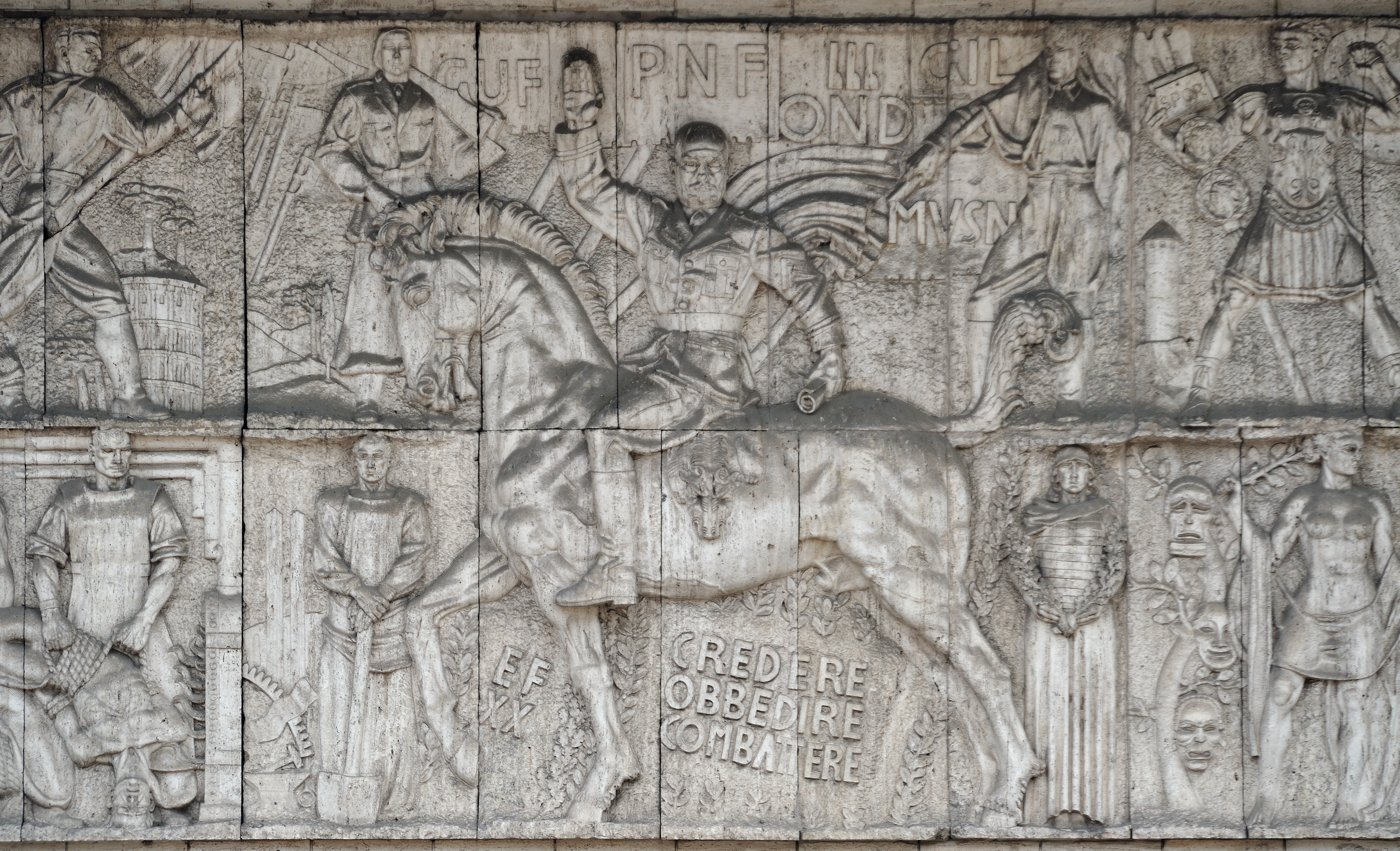
"Credere, obbedire, combattere" motto in the relief of the former Casa del Fascio, Bolzano.

"Credere, obbedire, combattere” (Believe, obey, fight) is the most well-known Fascist slogan. It calls for an absolute faith in the leader, disciplined submission to the state, and readiness for struggle and sacrifice in service of the nation. Allegedly coined by fascist politician Achille Starace, the motto was introduced by the National Fascist Party as an official slogan during the brief leadership of party secretary Giovanni Giuriati in 1931. During the fascist period, it was written on walls, introduced in school textbooks, and announced to the Italian youth at summer camps.

=== Me ne frego ===
The slogan “Me ne frego” (I don’t care) is a historic fascist and nationalist motto that expresses a contempt for fear, pain and death in service of the nation. It originated in Gabriele d’Annunzio’s writings, and was employed in World War I as a motto among the Italian Arditi, monarchists who volunteered to fight at the front. It served as a war cry for courage and daring, expressing “I don’t mind dying for freedom”. During the interwar period, the slogan became closely associated with the fascist movement in Italy as it was adopted by Mussolini’s Black Shirts and later by the Fascist regime, symbolizing a new Italian lifestyle and the interpretation of life as duty, exaltation and conquest. Following World War II, the slogan has been revived by modern fascist and neo-fascists movements in Italy.

== Fascist use of heraldry ==
Nazi-era coat of arms of Coburg

Nazi-era coat of arms of Thuringia

Fascist governments often saw the need to change the heraldry of their nations; in Germany, the arms of Coburg, featuring the head of Saint Maurice, was looked down upon for its religious and un-Aryan nature. It was replaced in 1934 with a coat of arms featuring a sword and swastika. Thuringia also saw the need to support the Nazi regime by adding a swastika to the paws of the lion on its coat of arms. In Italy, the chief of a coat of arms is often used to indicate political allegiance. Under the government of Mussolini, many families and locales adopted a red chief charged with a fasces to indicate allegiance to the National Fascist Party; this chief was called the capo del littorio. Francisco Franco, Chief of State of Francoist Spain, used a personal coat of arms featuring the Royal Bend of Castile, a heraldic symbol used by the Crown of Castile.

== Contemporary usage ==
Some neo-Nazi organizations continue to use the swastika, but many have moved away from such inflammatory symbols of early fascism. Some neo-fascist groups use symbols that are reminiscent of the swastika or other cultural or ancestral symbols that may evoke nationalistic sentiment but do not carry the same racist connotations. The use of fascist symbols is subject to legal restrictions in many countries.

- Crosses:
  - Arrow cross – Arrow Cross Party in Hungary
  - Celtic cross – used by neo-Nazi white nationalist groups worldwide, the Italian New Force, Stormfront, David Duke's website, VSBD/PdA, a banned German neo-Nazi party and the British People's Party, a banned British neo-Nazi party
  - Cross crosslet – Lithuanian National Socialist Party
  - Sun cross – Swedish Nordic Realm Party, Knights Party
- Swastika – continues to be used by neo-Nazi groups such as the American Nazi Party, the São Paulo Skinheads in Brazil, and was used by the National Socialist Front of Sweden
  - Bladed swastika – Russian National Unity
  - Fylfot - Patriotic Popular Front
- Wolfsangel symbol
  - Used by the SS and Hitlerjugend as well as various neo-Nazi groups
  - Azov Battalion in Ukraine
- Black Sun – Used by the Azov Battalion and Vanguard America as well as other groups such as Volksfront. The shooter behind the Christchurch mosque shootings engraved it on his guns and put it on the cover of his manifesto.
- Labrys (or Pelekys) – a Minoan double-headed axe, used by some fascist Greek nostalgics
- Runes:
  - Lebensrune + Todesrune (life/death rune) – Allgermanische Heidnische Front, National Alliance in the United States
  - Odal rune – common among various neo-Nazi groups
  - Sieg rune, especially on the Schutzstaffel badge, sometimes confused with or used interchangeably with Eihwaz
  - Tyr rune – featured on the badge of the SA Reichsführerschulen in Nazi Germany, and is sometimes used by neo-Nazis such as Nordic Resistance Movement
  - various SS runes – runes and pseudorunes commonly used by the Schutzstaffel (SS), some of which derived from Armanen runes
  - Orkhon script letters – used by followers of Nihal Atsiz, e.g.Türkçü Toplumcu Budun Derneği
- Triskelion-like symbol composed of three 7s used by the Afrikaner Weerstandsbeweging (Afrikaner Resistance Movement), a White Supremacist, Neo-Nazi organization in South Africa
- Neo-Nazis typically use Nordic Pagan symbols, including Mjölnir.
- Others, continued to be used by the National Socialist Japanese Workers' Party in Japan and formerly used by the Canadian Nazi Party and the New Triumph Party in Argentina

== Gallery ==
=== Fasces ===
==== Emblems ====
A perched eagle clutching a fasces was a common symbol used on Italian Fascist uniforms.

Helmet decal of the Voluntary Militia for National Security.

Emblem of the Hlinka Guard.

==== Flags ====
Flag of the National Fascist Party, bearing the fasces, which was the primary symbol of Italian Fascism.

Personal Flag of Benito Mussolini during his rule (1923-1943).

War flag of the Italian Social Republic.

Original flag of the British Union of Fascists.

Alternative flag of the British Union of Fascists.

Flag of the Argentine Fascist Party.

Flag of Patriot Front.

Flag of Frontal Action, an Italian neo-fascist group.

=== Swastika ===
==== Emblems ====
The Hakenkreuz was the main symbol of National Socialism.

Insignia of the 5th SS Panzer Division Wiking.

Insignia of the 11th SS Volunteer Panzergrenadier Division Nordland.

Parteiadler (1933–1945) of the Nazi Party.

Reichsadler (1935–1945) of Germany.

Emblem of the All-Russian Fascist Party.

Emblem of the Pērkonkrusts.

Emblem of the National Socialist Workers' Party of Denmark.

==== Flags ====
Flag of the National Socialist German Workers Party.

Personal standard of Adolf Hitler.

War ensign of Nazi Germany (1935–1938).

War ensign of Nazi Germany (1938–1945).

Flag of the German American Bund.

Flag of the National Socialist Bulgarian Workers Party.

Flag of the Imperial Fascist League.

Flag of the All-Russian Fascist Party.

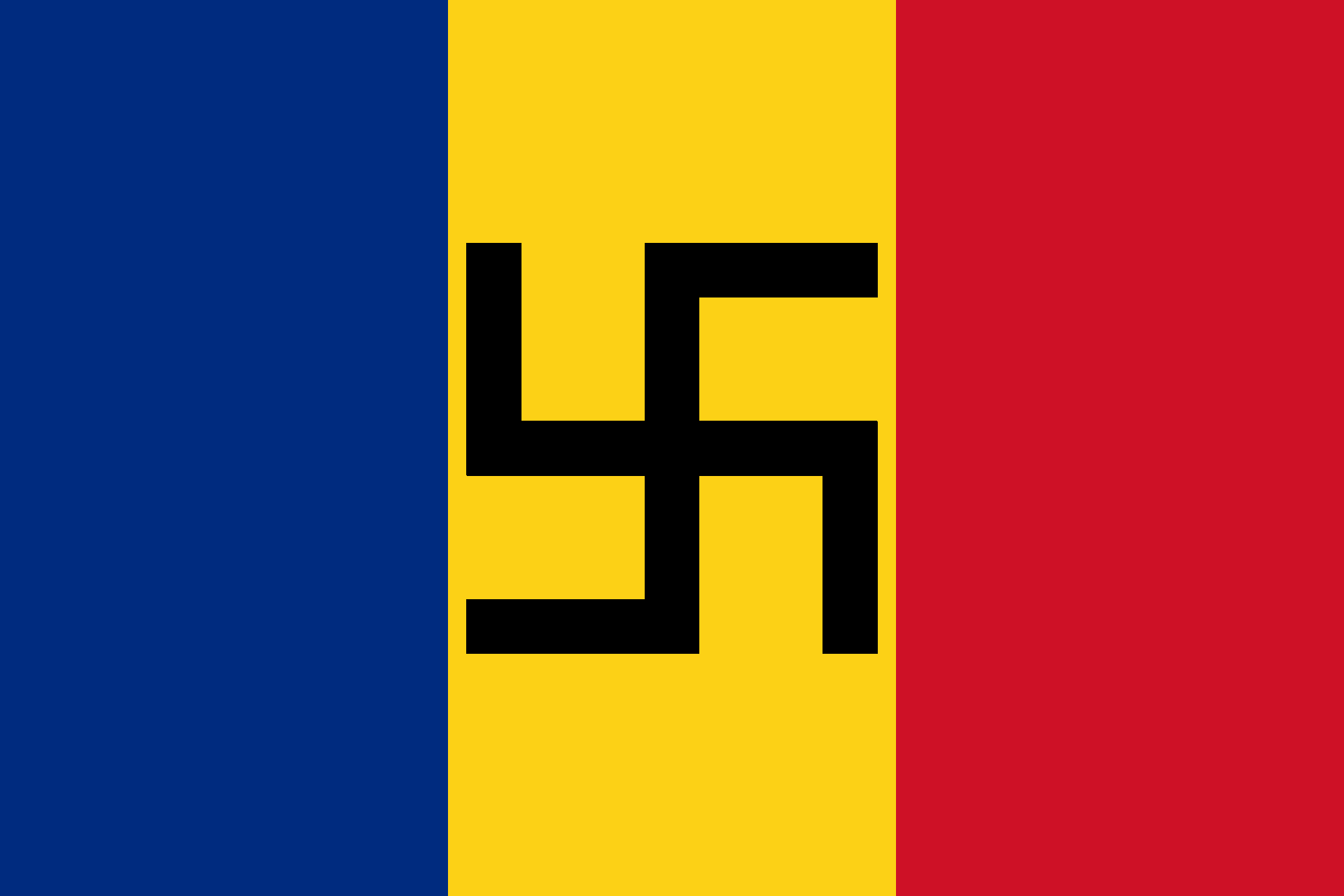
Flag of the National-Christian Defense League.

Flag of the National Socialist Workers' Party (Sweden).

Flag of the National Unity Party of Canada.

=== Yoke and Arrows ===
==== Emblems ====
The yoke and arrows as the emblem of the Falange Española, the premier symbol of Falangism.

State coat of arms of Spain (1939–1945).

State coat of arms of Spain (1945–1977).

==== Flags ====
Flag of the Falange Española de las JONS, still in use by Falangist activists.

Flag of Spain defaced with the yoke and arrows.

Flag of the Falange Venezolana.

Flag of the Falange Nacional Garciana Ecuatoriana.

Flag of the Ukrainian Falange.

== See also ==
- Anarchist symbolism
- Communist symbolism
- Rising Sun Flag#Controversy
- Schwarze Sonne
- Strafgesetzbuch section 86a
- Western use of the swastika in the early 20th century
- Modern display of the Confederate flag
- Z (military symbol)

== Bibliography ==
- Payne, Stanley G. (2003). A History of Fascism 1914–1945. Routledge. ISBN 0-203-80956-4.
- Bosworth, R. J. B. (2002). Mussolini. London: Arnold / Oxford University Press. ISBN 0 340 73144 3.
- Hohler, Susanne (2017). Fascism in Manchuria: the Soviet-China encounter in the 1930s. London: Bloomsbury Publishing Plc. ISBN 978-1-7845-3522-3.
- Heller, Steven (2019). The swastika and symbols of hate: extremist iconography today. New York: Allworth Press, an imprint of Skyhorse Publishing. ISBN 978-1-62153-720-5.
- Snyder, Louis L. (1998) [1976]. Encyclopedia of the Third Reich. Hertfordshire: Wordsworth Editions Limited. ISBN 1 85326 684 1.
- Whitman, James Q. (14 February 2017). "Hitler's American Model: The United States and the Making of Nazi Race Law". JSTOR. Princeton University Press. doi:10.2307/j.ctvc774zw.
- Garg, Harshit; Singh, Pushparaj (2025). "Rise Of Fascism in Italy" (PDF). International Journal of Research Publication and Reviews. 6 (5). Amity Institute of Social Sciences: 10924–10926. ISSN 2582-7421.
- Griffiths, Richard (1983). Fellow Travellers of the Right: British Enthusiasts for Nazi Germany. Oxford: Oxford University Press. ISBN 0-19-285116-0.
- Falasca-Zamponi, Simonetta (1997). Fascist spectacle : the aesthetics of power in Mussolini's Italy. London: University of California Press. ISBN 0-520-20623-1.
- Mosley, Oswald (1936). Fascism: 100 Questions Asked and Answered (PDF). Westminster, London: B.U.F. Publications ltd.
- Lynch, Breana (2022). Feminist Critiques of Ecofascist, Nativist Appropriations of Indigeneity since 2016 (Master's thesis). New York: University at Albany.
- Marshall, Anthony J. (1984). "Symbols and Showmanship in Roman Public Life: The Fasces". Phoenix. 38 (2): 120. doi:10.2307/1088896.
- Blamires, Cyprian P.; Jackson, Paul, eds. (2006). World fascism: a historical encyclopedia. Santa Barbara, Calif: ABC-CLIO. ISBN 1-57607-940-6.
