= Minoan Moulds of Palaikastro =

Casting moulds for plaques with figures and symbols

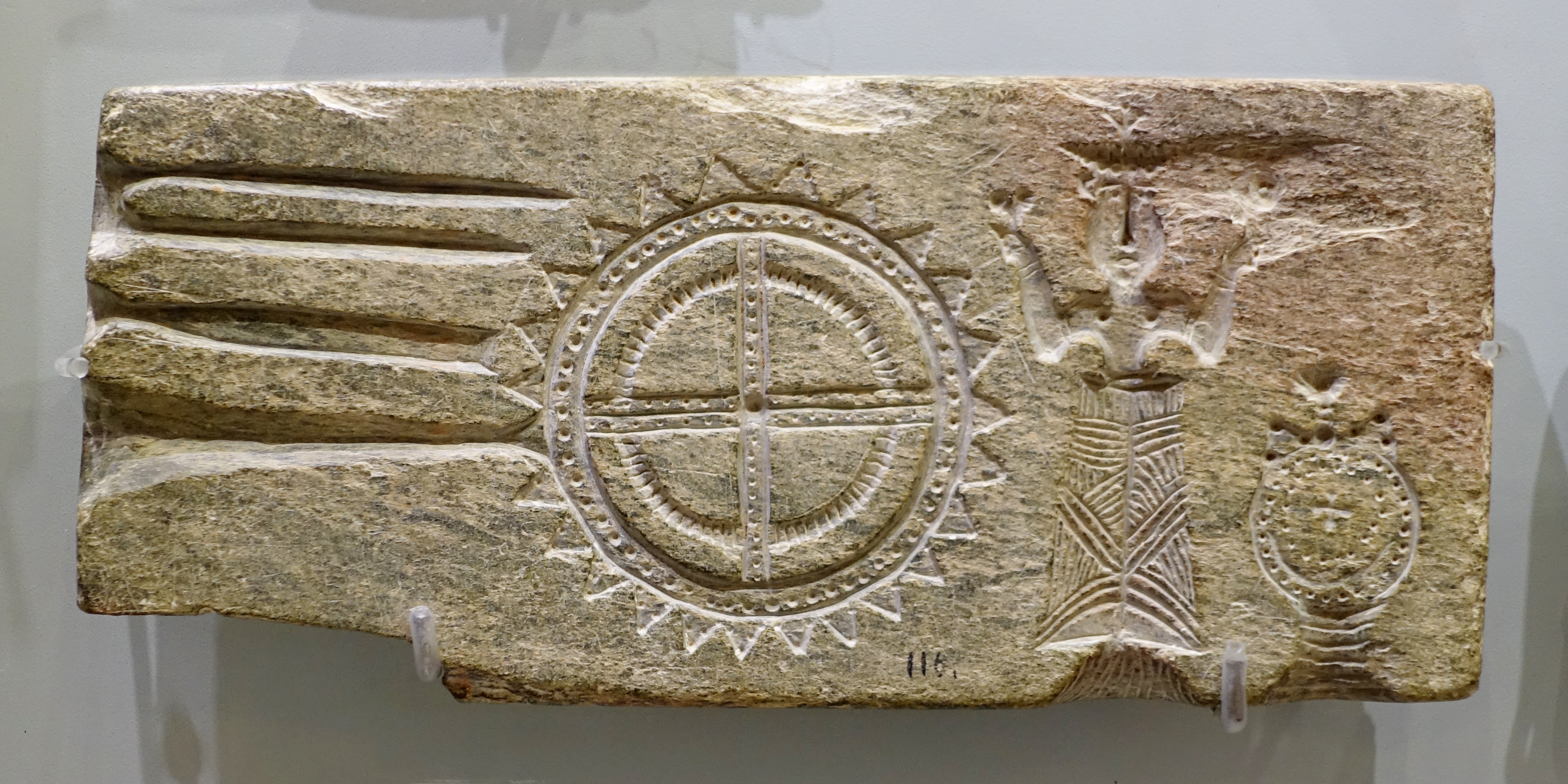
- Casting mould with gears and female figure - Plate A front
- Material: Schist
- Created: c. 1790 BC
- Discovered: October 1899; Crete, Greece

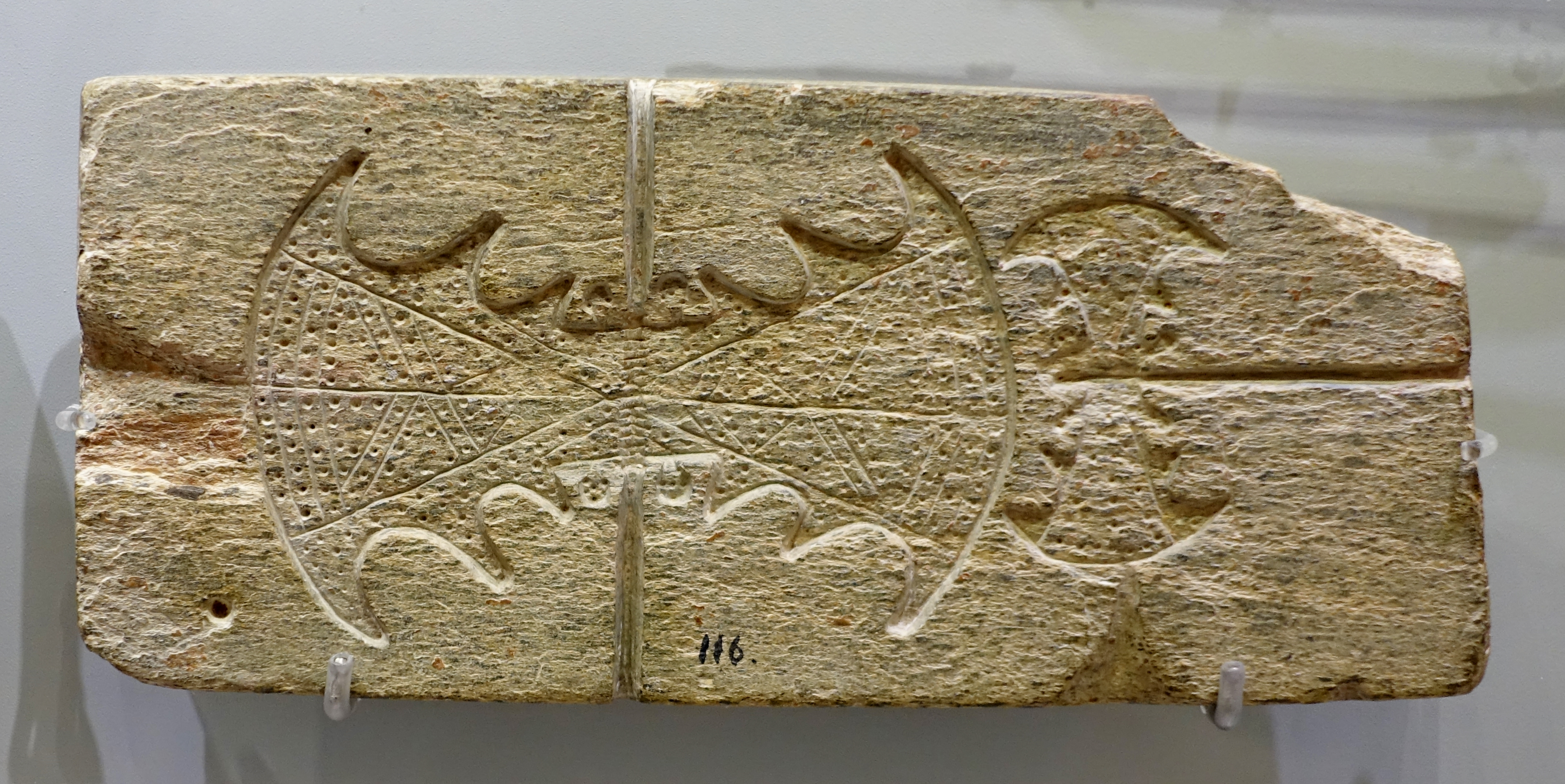
Casting mold with a couple of double axes - Plate B front

The Minoan Moulds of Palaikastro (Greek: Μήτρες του Παλαιοκάστρου Σητείας, romanized: Mitres tou Palaiokastrou Sitias) are two double-sided pieces of schist, formed in the Minoan period as casting moulds for plaques with figures and symbols. These include female figures with raised arms, labrys double axes (Λάβρυες, labryes) and opium poppy flowers or capsules, two double axes with indented edges, the Horns of Consecration symbol, and a sun-like disc with complex markings, which has been claimed by some researchers to be for making objects to use in astronomical predictions of solar and lunar eclipses.

They were found in 1899 near Palaikastro in the eastern part of Crete, and are now in the Herakleion Archeological Museum in Crete.

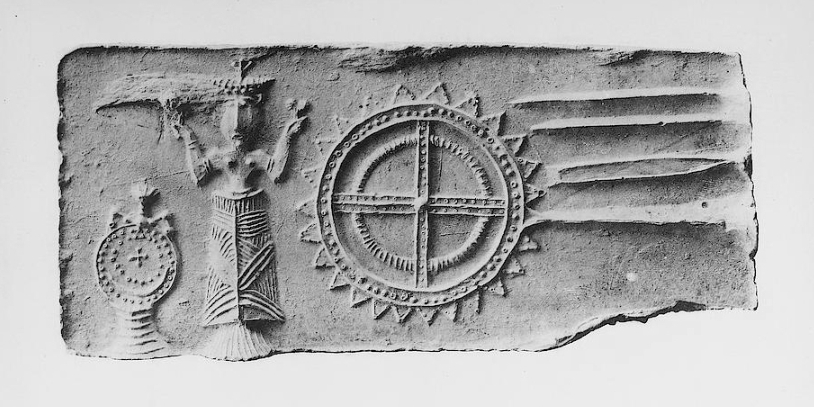
Plaster cast of Plate A, Front

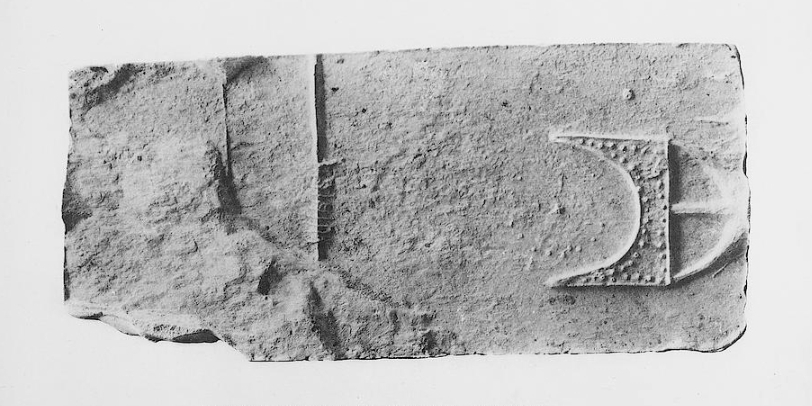
Plaster cast of Plate A, Rear

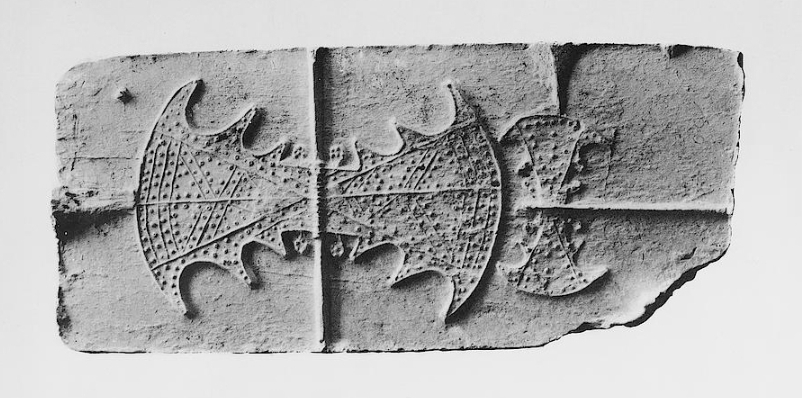
Plaster cast of Plate B, Front

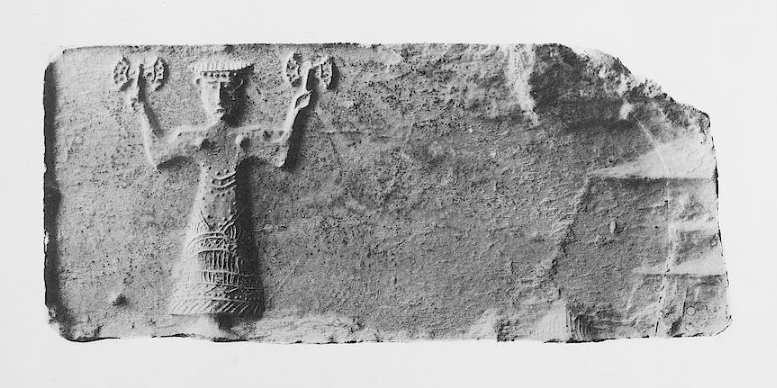
Plaster cast of Plate B, Rear

== Description ==
Stefanos Xanthoudidis, who published the find in 1900 described the two moulds, which were made from relatively soft and brittle schist as Plate Α and Plate Β. His plaster casts, which are also reproduced on the right hand side, are mirror images of the original moulds. Both moulds are 225 mm (8.9 in) wide, 100 mm (3.9 in) high and 20 mm (0.8 in) thick, while the width of the plaster casts is 230 mm (9.1 in).

The front of Plate Α shows a large disc with rectangular spokes and a serrated edge (which some are keen to interpret as "geared"), a female figure with raised arms, who holds flowers in her hands and a small disc with a cross in the centre on top of a bell-shaped and horizontally striped base, above a crescent. Double horns, the 'Horns of Consecration' of the Minoan culture, and a trident are shown on the rear. A small piece of the lower edge of the mould is broken-off.

The front of Plate B shows engravings of a couple of double axes, dissimilar in size with teethed edges. The double axe or labrys was a cultural, almost certainly religious, symbol of the Minoan culture, often used for votive offerings, as were goddess figures with uplifted hands. The rear of the plate shows a female figure with raised arms holding two double axes. A small piece of the lower edge of the mould is broken-off as well. Both plates are exhibited side by side in the Heraklion Archaeological Museum. The visitors can only see their front sides. The captions in the museum say that they stem from 1370 to 1200 BCE.

=== Iconography ===
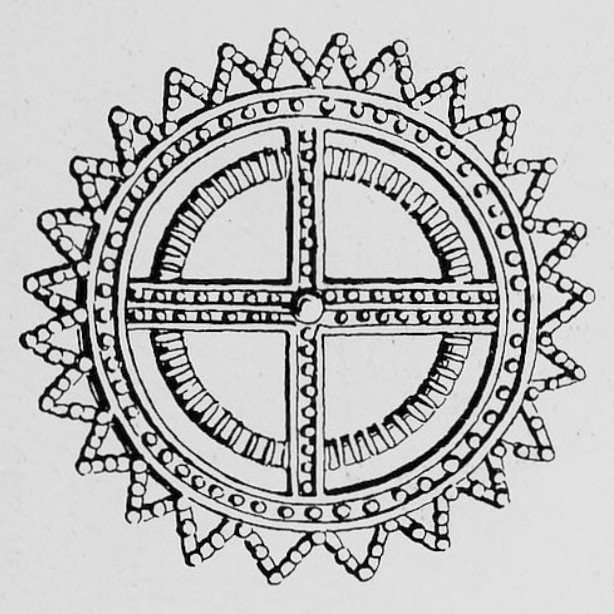
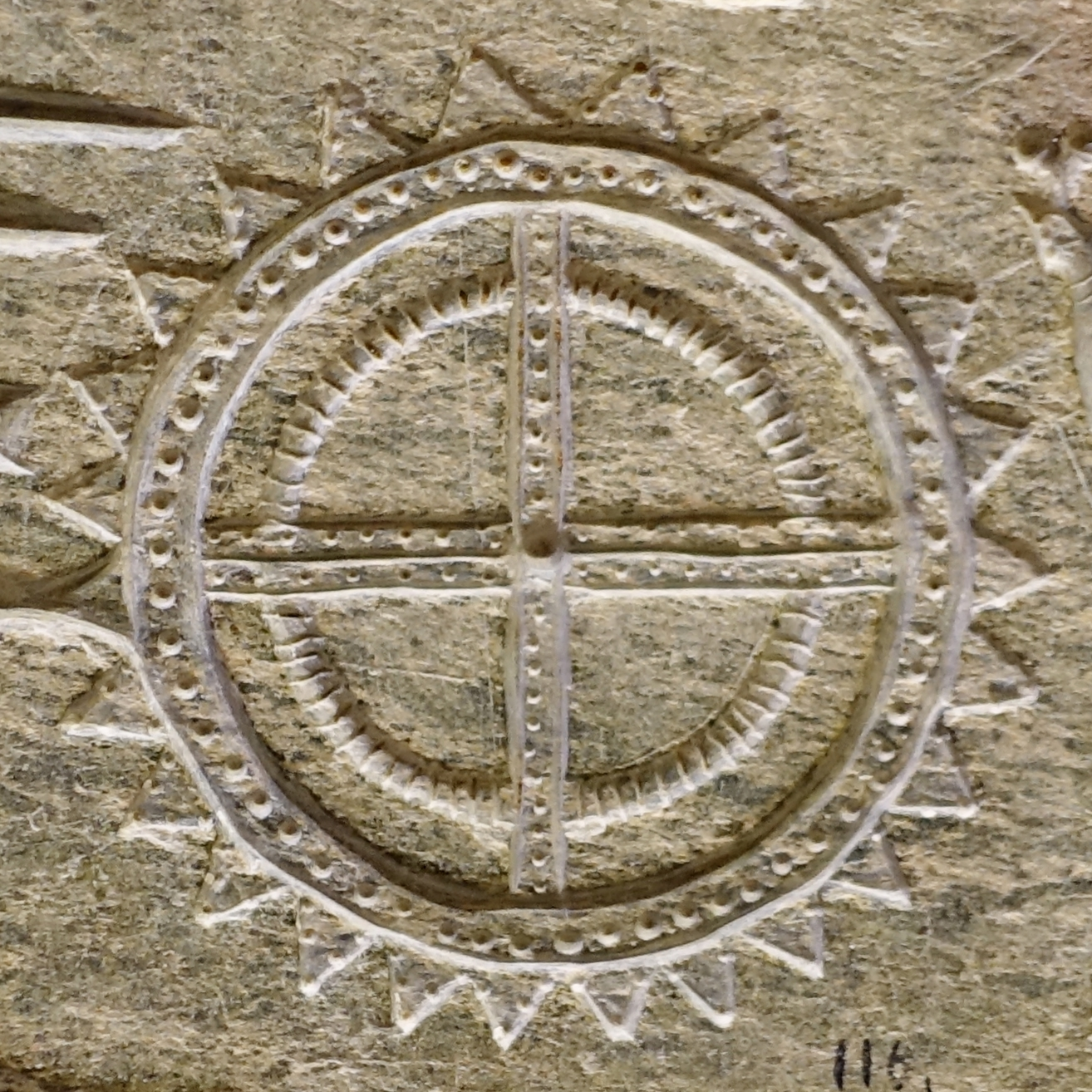
Drawing after Arthur Evans and original of the geared object

Very interesting objects are shown on the front of Plate Α, as recognised by Arthur Evans, who described them in his book The Palace of Minos at Knossos in 1921. On pages 478 and 479, he compares the base of an ivory object, of the Knossos board game, with the geared object on the mould of Palaikastro. On page 514 he shows drawings of the objects left and right of the female figurine of Plate Α, however, not very precisely. Evans refers to the isosceles cross being used in many cultures as the most simple representation of a star, and concludes that the geared object is a combination of a Morning Star with the disc of the sun. He interprets that the smaller object is a symbol for the goddess as the queen of the underworld and as the stars of the night. In combination with the crescent, the cross is then an Evening Star.

== Possible historical astronomy function ==
In 2013, five scientists published a paper in the Mediterranean Archaeology and Archaeometry journal, in which they described the 85 by 85 millimetres (3.3 in × 3.3 in) sun-like form on Plate Α as a casting mould for manufacturing a spoked disc, which was used in the Minoan times of the 15th century BC as a sun dial, for establishing the geographical latitude and for predicting solar and lunar eclipses. The straight gashes beside the sun shape they interpret as moulds for two pins and a compasses or tweezers-like object, to be used in conjunction with it. They claimed to be able to predict eclipses even in the modern era with some accuracy, when using it.

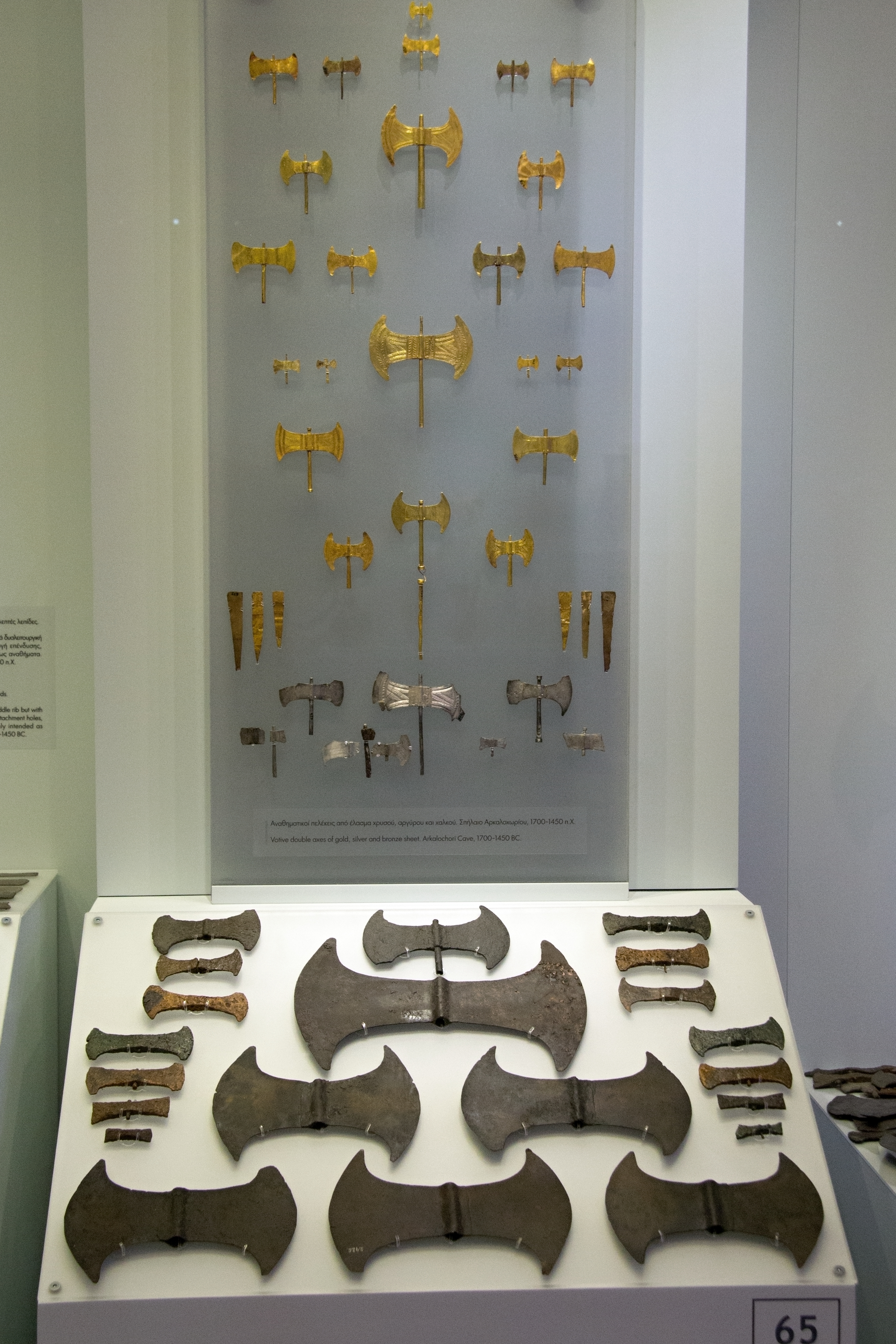
Labrys double axes as votive offerings, Arkilochori Cave (Crete), 1700-1450 BC, AMH

Similar comments have been made by Minas Tsikritsis in April 2011 in public. He described together with Efstratios Theodosiou the smaller round image to the right of the female figure as a Minoan cosmology model with the planetary system above the Flat Earth, in which the cross that symbolises the sun is surrounded by 18 dots and those including the crescent-shaped moon symbol are surrounded by 28 dots, an indication hinting at the Saros cycle with 28 lunar eclipses in 18 years. This is approximately 30 millimetres (1.2 in) long and 62 millimetres (2.4 in) high. They interpret the spoked disc on the other side of the female figurine, which is associated with Titaness Rhea, as a portable analog calculator, which was created 1400 years before the Antikythera mechanism.

== Dating ==
Chronological dating of the moulds is difficult, because the precise original location of the find and its surroundings are not known. Stratigraphy or the assessment of age-equivalent stratigraphic markers are, therefore, not applicable. In 1927, Martin P. Nilsson compared the style of the female figurine of Plate Α with those on various Minoan-Mycenaean gold rings and a relief on the Hagia Triada sarcophagus.

In 1941, Luisa Banti classified both female figurines as variations of the type "goddess with raised hands", similar to the terracotta figurines found in Knossos, Gazi, Karphi and other places in Crete, which belong to the Late Minoan III phase. Stylianos Alexiou endorsed in 1958 the dating as belonging to Late Minoan III, but he noted the differences in the gesture, as the female figurines hold something in their hands.

In 2016, based on a stylistic and iconographic assessment, the casting moulds were dated as being older by Jan G. Velsink, who dates them as belonging to the Middle Minoan phases MM II or III.

== Discovery and publication ==
The two moulds were discovered in October 1899 by a farmer from Karydi 150 m (490 ft) northeast of the village of Palaikastro. The Gendarmerie sent the finds to the then Cretan capital Chania, where they were assessed and kept by the archeologist and historian Stefanos Xanthoudidis. He recognised the importance of ancient craftsmanship and delivered the moulds to the museum in Heraklion which had been set up in 1883. Xanthoudidis described the objects in March 1900 in an article ("Ancient moulds from Sitia in Crete") in the journal of the Archaeological Society of Athens. This publication included photos of plaster casts of all four sides of the moulds.
