= Tadeusz Puder =

Polish Roman Catholic priest

Personal life
- Born: Tadeusz Puder; 8 July 1908 Warsaw, Warsaw Governorate, Congress Poland
- Died: 27 January 1945 (aged 36) Warsaw, Republic of Poland
- Resting place: Bródno Cemetery

Religious life
- Religion: Catholicism
- Ordination: 1932

Military service
- Rank: Priest

Tadeusz Puder (July 8, 1908 – January 27, 1945) was a Polish Roman Catholic priest of Jewish origin.

== Early life ==
Puder was born in a Jewish family. At age 9, he was baptized. Puder attended Adam Mickiewicz State Junior High School. In 1928, he joined the Archdiocesan Seminary of Warsaw. On October 18, 1932, he was ordained.

== Career ==
He studied theology and was sent to the Pontifical Biblical Institute in Rome. In 1937, Puzer started to work at the parish in Rzeczyca. Then he transferred to the parish of Saint James the Apostle in Warsaw.

In June 1938, he was appointed rector – vicar of the Saint Hyacinth in Warsaw. Thereafter, he became the subject of a campaign of hatred on the part of the right wing, and his Jewish origin aroused indignation. On July 3, 1938, a few weeks after his appointment, Puder was slapped during mass by a man who shouted, "This is a Jew!". The perpetrator was detained and assaulted by the parishioners. The beating caused controversy. The Catholic press, Głos Narodu (Voice of the Nation) and Mały Dziennik (Small Journal), condemned the assault. The right-wing weekly Prosto z mostu blamed the Catholic Church for the incident which, according to journalists, should not appoint people of Jewish origin as priests, because a person who "grew up in a Jewish atmosphere" cannot be Polish, even if he was baptized.

After the outbreak of World War II, Puder left Warsaw. He worked in Białołęka in the chapel of the Franciscan Sisters of the Family of Mary who ran the orphanage. On April 24, 1941, after the denunciation of priest Stanisław Trzeciak, Puder was arrested by the Gestapo on charges of not wearing an armband, which, according to German decrees, must be worn by all Jews. On September 1, 1941, he was sentenced to one year and eight months in prison. Due to deteriorating health he went to the prison hospital, from where, thanks to the help of nuns, he escaped on November 12, 1942. Until his liberation, he hid in Białołęka at the Franciscan Sisters of the Family of Mary. After liberation, he went to Warsaw.

On January 23, 1945, he had a fatal car accident, passing on January 27, 1945.
