= National Radical Organization =

Polish collaborationist organization during World War II

National Radical Organization Narodowa Organizacja Radykalna
- Abbreviation: NOR
- Secretary: Władysław Wojtowicz
- Governing body: Rada Główna
- De jure leader: Władysław Puławski
- De facto leader: Jan Podgórski
- Second deputy: Antoni Mucharski
- Founders: Andrzej Świetlicki and Stanisław Trzeciak
- Founded: October 1939
- Banned: April 1940
- Preceded by: National Radical Camp
- Headquarters: Lindenallee, Warschau, General Government
- Newspaper: Odrodzenie and Pochodnie
- Paramilitary wing: Atak
- Ideology: Nazism
- Political position: Far-right
- Religion: Catholicism
- Supporting organisations: Abwehr and Gestapo
- Party symbol: Toporzeł

National Radical Organization (Polish: Narodowa Organizacja Radykalna, NOR), was a collaborationist pro-Nazi group. It emerged after the 1939 German invasion of Poland. It was founded by Andrzej Świetlicki and Stanisław Trzeciak.

== Background ==
In March 1940, NOR collaborated with German forces to orchestrate the Easter Pogrom, attacking Jewish homes and businesses in Warsaw. Members urged Poles to join the pogroms, align with NOR, and support Nazi efforts against the Soviet Union. They blamed the 1939 September campaign defeat on the Sanation party and endorsed ceding western territories to Germany. The paramilitary wing, Atak (transl. Attack), marked Aryan shops with the Topokrzyż symbol during the pogrom.

NOR occupied the former Young Poland Union premises on Lindenallee, with Świetlicki using Julian Tuwim’s former apartment. The German military administration, including Abwehr and Gestapo, initially supported NOR.

== Dissolution ==
After the General Government’s civil administration assumed control and Hitler banned cooperation with Polish political groups in April 1940, NOR lost Nazi support. In May 1940, authorities arrested Świetlicki, imprisoning him in Pawiak. On June 20, 1940, Germans executed him, alongside NOR activists Wojciech Kwasieborski and Tadeusz Lipkowski, in the Palmiry massacre. NOR dissolved in June 1940. One of the NOR members, Stanisław Brochwicz, wrote a book in 1940 about Hitler, praising National Socialism. He was a member of the propaganda arm of the General Government, collaborating with the Abwehr and the Gestapo. On February 17, 1941, he was sentenced to death by an underground court for collaboration. The death sentence was carried out in March 1941.

Trzeciak faced execution by Germans in 1944.
