= Flash and circle =

Symbol of the British Union of Fascists

The Flash and Circle

The flash and circle is a symbol often associated with fascism in Britain. It was first adopted in 1935 by the British Union of Fascists (BUF). Although rooted in fascist ideology, variations of the symbol have subsequently been used by non-fascist political parties and organisations in different parts of the world.

== Origins within the BUF (1935–1940) ==
The first flag of the British Union of Fascists was used in early October 1932 for its inauguration and first rally. It was replaced by the Fascist Flag below in early 1933.

Adopted in early 1933, the Fascist Flag would be used extensively by the BUF up until its disbandment in 1940. Even after the Flash and Circle was adopted in 1935, this flag would continue to be flown alongside it at local and national events.

The flag of the British Union of Fascists adopted in 1935 featuring the Flash and Circle, known as the "Union Banner".

The Union Jack flag of the British Union of Fascists adopted in the 1940s.

The BUF was founded in 1932 and adopted the fasces as its emblem, whose bundle of sticks represents strength through unity, and whose axe represents the supreme authority of the state to which citizens owe allegiance. Although the fasces was utilized almost exclusively by Benito Mussolini's Blackshirts, the BUF claimed that they had a right to use the symbol on the basis that the fasces was used extensively in Britain during Roman times, and that the British Empire continued to carry on the tradition of civilisation from them.

The symbol would officially be changed in March 1934 from the plain gold fasces to a Union Flag within a shield and a fasces placed on top. The reasons for this change was that the BUF wanted to emphasise its commitment to king and country through the addition of the national emblem, the other reason was to help the movement distinguish itself in foreign nations.

Starting in the 1930s, the fasces began to be phased out in favour of the BUF's final symbol, the Flash and Circle. In the summer of 1935, Eric H. Piercy, the commander of the Fascist Defence Force, designed the emblem and presented it to Oswald Mosley, the BUF's leader. The official colors were: a white lightning bolt ("flash") and circle, a blue roundel, and a red background. The symbolism of this design was meant to convey a flash of action within a circle of unity.

While there was a lack of consistency in the appearance of the Flash and Circle, such as the short-lived inverted version used in 1935, it would go on to become the main symbol of the party and was used extensively throughout 1935–1940. The BUF's left-wing opponents nicknamed the symbol the "flash in the pan". The usage of any symbols by the BUF would slowly decline after the party was banned and its leadership (including Mosley) was interned under Defence Regulation 18B.

== Post-war usage (1948 onwards) ==
After being released from internment, Mosley would continue his political activities, creating the Union Movement (UM) in February 1948. As a successor to the BUF, the UM would go on to adopt the Flash and Circle as its symbol. Throughout the 50s and 60s multiple branch flags were adopted using a black background with a yellow Flash and Circle with the name of the branch underneath in yellow as well. Another variant was adopted by the Mosley Youth in the early 50s. This design consisted of a red background with a black circle and a white flash.

The Flash and Circle would also be adopted by the National Party of Europe (NPE) during its founding meeting on March 1, 1962. Its adoption was championed by Oswald Mosley over another symbol proposed for the NPE, a Celtic Cross. He argued it only represented a portion of European ancestry like Belgium and the United Kingdom, whilst the Flash represented action and solidarity.

== Usage outside of the BUF ==
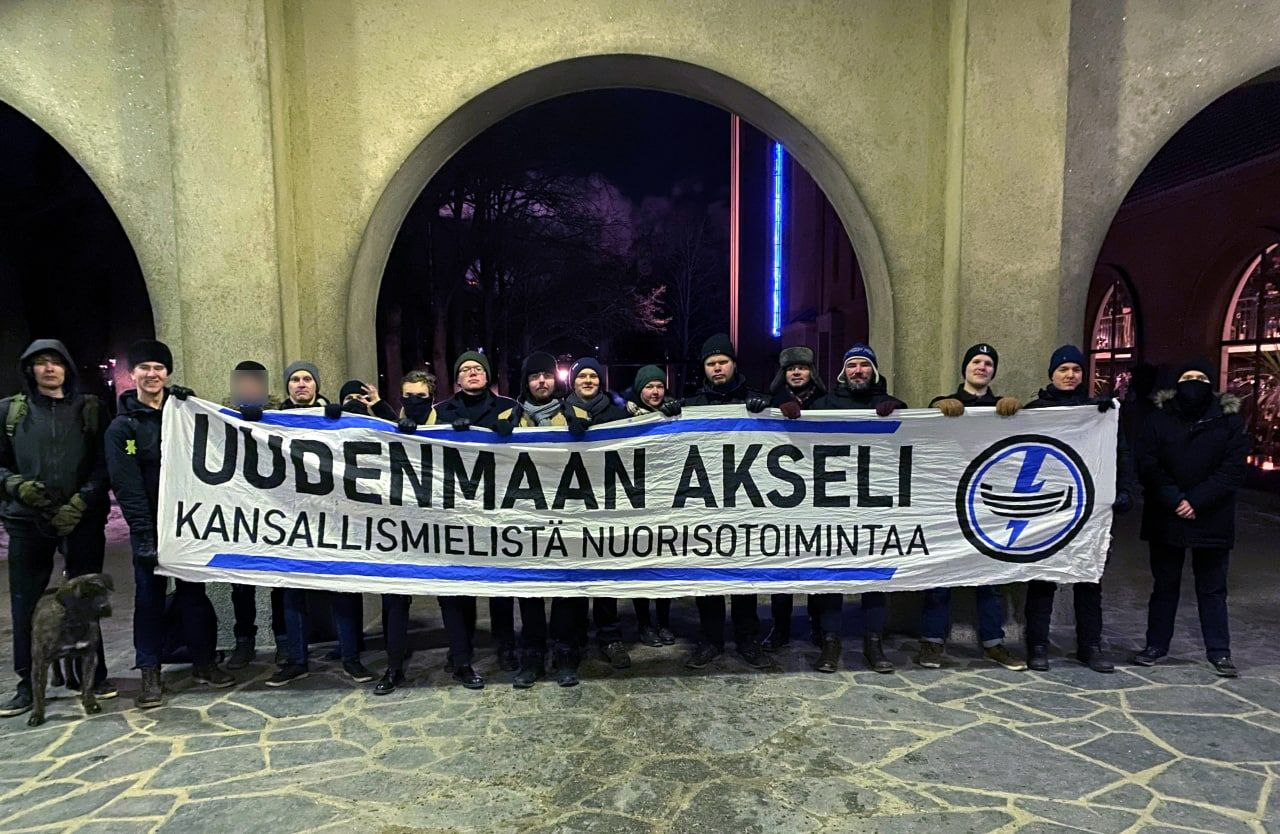
Uusimaa chapter of the National Axis with the symbol

The emblem of the Bulgarian fascist party, Union of Bulgarian National Legions (SBNL) utilised a variant of the version of flash and circle, replacing the swastika. The lightning bolt represented the SBNL striking at communism. Eventually the emblem would replace the lightning bolt with the swastika towards the end of 1944.

The Youth Wing of the Italian Neo-fascist movement CasaPound, Blocco Studentesco ("Students' Block") utilises a variant of the flash and circle directly inspired from Oswald Mosley's British Union of Fascists. The youth of the neo-fascist Suomen Sisu, Kansallinen Akseli (National Axis), uses the flash in a circle symbol.

=== By non-fascists ===
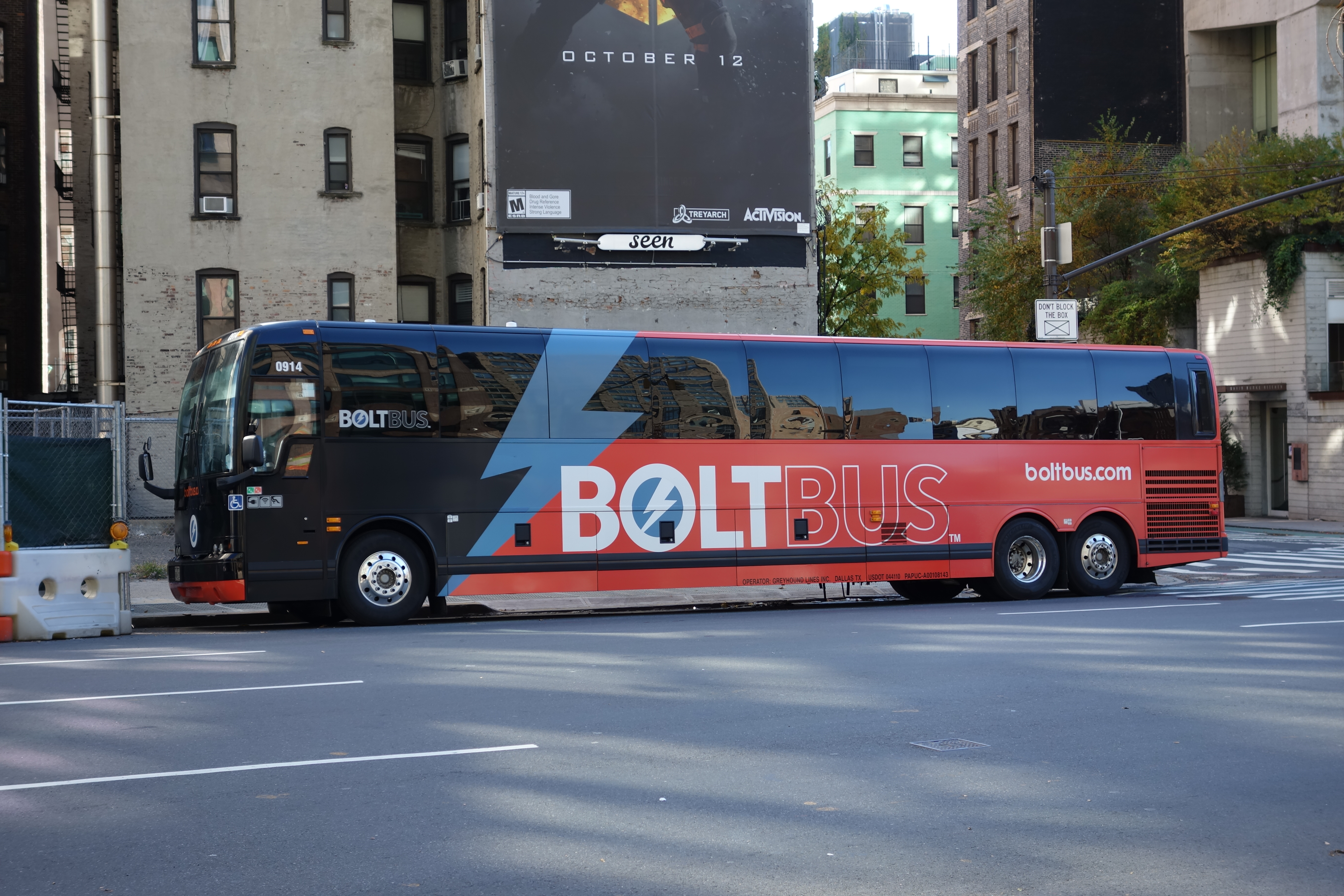
A BoltBus in Manhattan, New York City

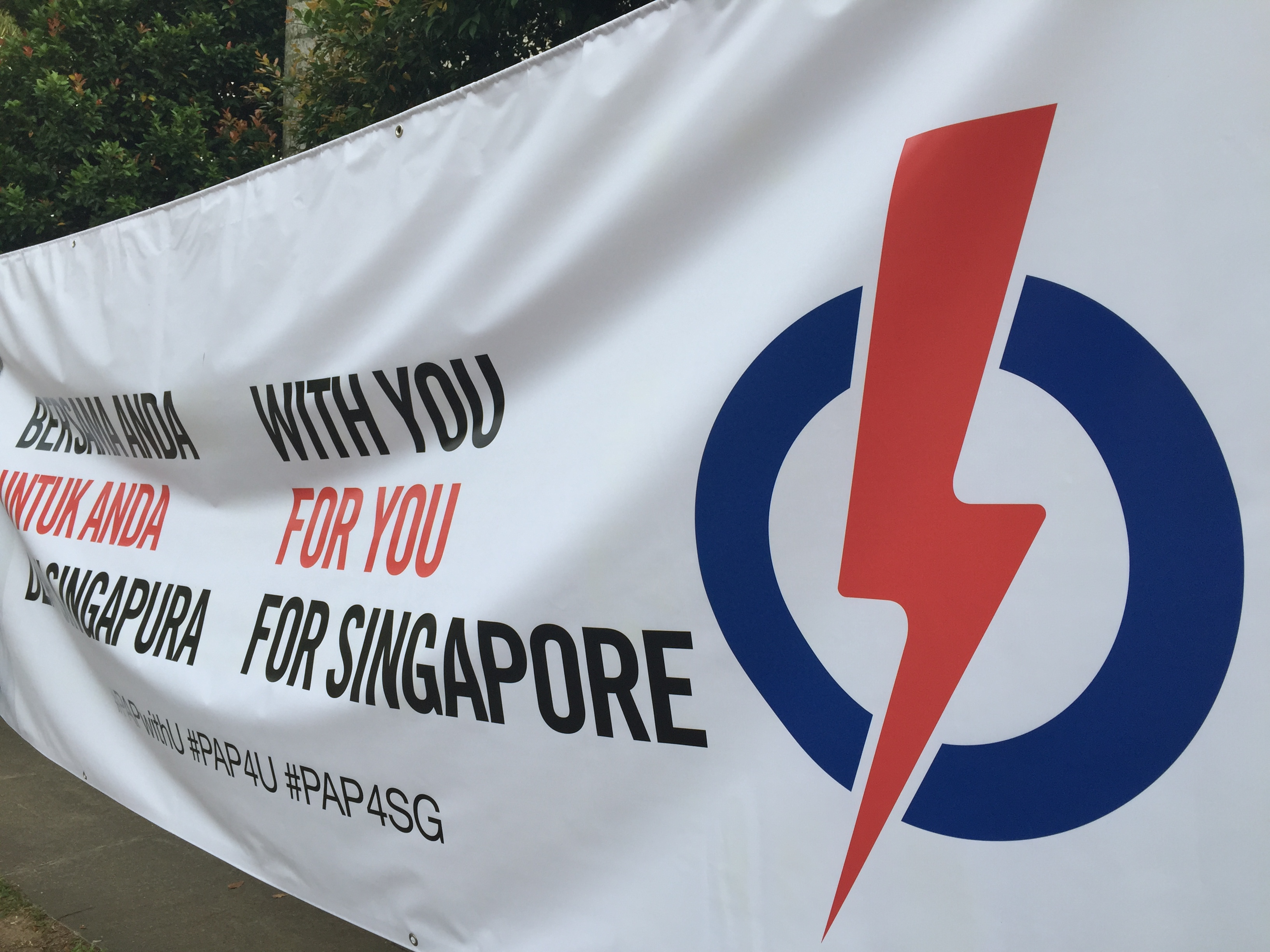
A post of the People's Action Party of Singapore during the 2015 general election campaign

The simple combination of a lightning bolt and a circle has inspired numerous designs that bear no relation to the fascist flash and circle. In most instances, there is no indication that these designs were intended to reference or reflect any political or ideological symbolism.

Among these is the logo of BoltBus, which adopted the design before any resemblance to fascist symbolism was recognised. The Tampa Bay Lightning ice hockey team features a similar motif in both their primary and alternate logos. A comparable design appears on certain high-voltage electricity warning signs, which depict a lightning bolt within a circle. This configuration was also adapted by Marilyn Manson as an insignia for his album Antichrist Superstar. German automobile manufacturer Opel employs a stylised horizontal lightning bolt encircled in black and white as its official emblem.

The insignia of the People's Action Party (PAP) of Singapore consists of a red flash superimposed on a smaller blue circle, set against a white background. According to the party, the emblem symbolises "action within social and racial unity", with the white background signifying purity of thought and deed. When asked about the origins of the symbol, Lee Kuan Yew, a founding member of the PAP and the first Prime Minister of Singapore, acknowledged that the design was partially influenced by the BUF's emblem, though he noted that the PAP's version employed a different colour scheme.

The flag of the Black Shorts in the Jeeves and Wooster television series.

In the 1990–1993 television series Jeeves and Wooster, the Black Shorts use a flag similar to the British Union of Fascists with the same flag colour scheme as the National Socialists.

== See also ==
- Fasces
