= Stanisław Brochwicz =

Polish Nazi collaborator

- Born: 1910
- Died: 1941 (aged 30–31); Poniatowski Bridge, Warschau, General Government
- Cause of death: Assassination
- Other names: Stanisław von Brauchitsch, Henryk Zrąb
- Occupation: Journalist
- Criminal charge: Espionage
- Criminal penalty: Death
- Espionage activity
- Country: Second Polish Republic
- Allegiance: Nazi Germany
- Notable work: Bohaterowie czy zdrajcy?
- Political party: NOR

Stanisław Brochwicz (1910 – March 1941) was a Polish journalist, far-right activist, Nazi collaborator, Gestapo and National Radical Organization (NOR) member. He was assassinated by a squad of the Polish Underground State.

== Biography ==
Prior to World War II, Brochwicz was a vocal Germanophile. Taking advantage of a Fund for National Culture scholarship, he travelled to Nazi Germany, Italy and Austria. From 1934, Brochwicz began writing pro-Nazi articles. His work was published in Polska Zbrojna and broadcast on Polskie Radio. He was arrested by Polish counterintelligence and sentenced to death, but freed by the Germans during the German invasion of Poland in 1939, before his sentence was carried out.

During the war, Brochwicz was a member of the NOR (1939–1940). In the Polish press, he wrote articles praising Nazi Germany and Adolf Hitler. In 1941, Brochwicz authored his memoir, Bohaterowie czy zdrajcy? Wspomnienia więźnia politycznego (transl. Heroes or traitors? Memories of a political prisoner), in which he expressed his support for the Nazis.

Brochwicz was convicted of collaboration on 17 February 1941 by the verdict of the Polish Military Special Court, with a sentence of death. He was executed by an underground assassination squad, which stabbed him to death in March of that year.
