= Arkalochori Axe =

2nd millennium BC Minoan labrys

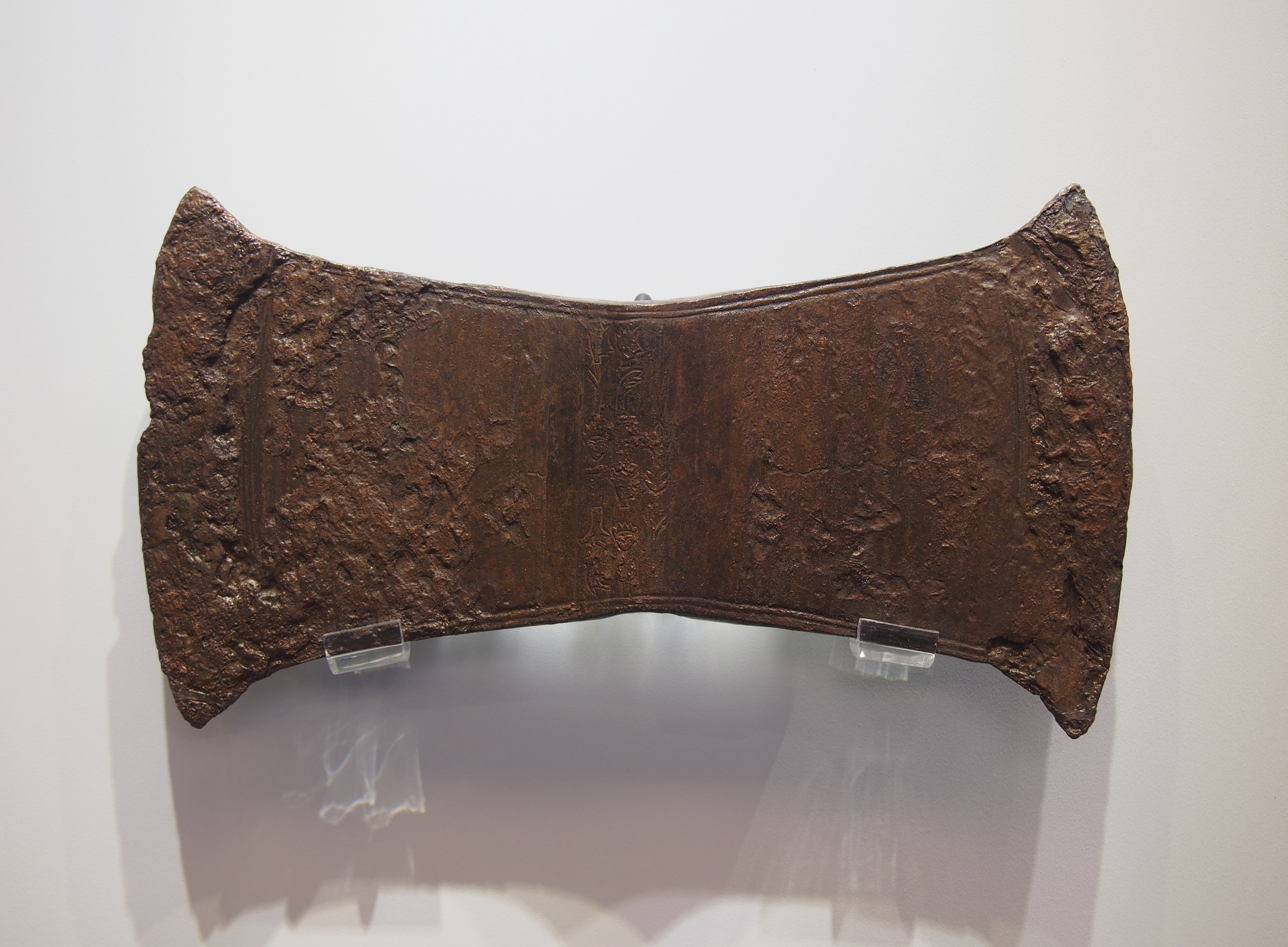
- The central portion of the bronze labrys bears inscriptions
- Material: Bronze
- Created: c. 1650 BC
- Discovered: 1934; Arkalochori, Crete, Greece
- Discovered by: Spyridon Marinatos
- Present location: Heraklion Archaeological Museum, Crete, Greece

The Arkalochori Axe is a 2nd millennium BC Minoan bronze votive double axe head or labrys excavated by Spyridon Marinatos in 1934 in the Arkalochori cave in Crete, which is believed to have been used for religious rituals. There are many other examples of labrys surviving from the Minoan Civilization, including considerable numbers found in the same cave, but this one is unusual because of its large size and because it is inscribed with fifteen symbols. Most are much smaller, though sometimes in gold or silver, although other "full-size" examples have been found, including in the Arkalochori cave. Scholarly interest in the axe has mostly been focused on the inscriptions.

The axe-head is of cast bronze, with a circular hole for a shaft in the centre. The cutting edges to either side "must initially have been sharp". Given its age and corrosion, it cannot be determined whether it had any wear from use. The axe-head is 241 mm across, and around the shaft hole 74 mm wide. It was found as part of a large deposit, that entirely lacked objects in stone and other materials that are usually found in such deposits, including only objects in various metals, including silver and gold. Accordingly, it has been suggested that the partly-walled up cave functioned as a storeroom for a local guild of metal-workers producing these items.

It has been suggested that these symbols might be Linear A, although some scholars disagree.

The Arkalochori axe (Museum number X2416), and the Phaistos Disc are exhibited at the Heraklion Archaeological Museum (Galleries V and VII, respectively). They share some symbols.

== Inscription ==
Of the fifteen signs, two appear to be unique. The following suggestions for comparison with Linear A and Phaistos Disc glyphs are attributed to Torsten Timm (2004). Reading top to bottom, right to left, the symbols are:

№	Sign	Comment	Linear A	Phaistos Disc
01	01		A 304 KA ??	
02	02		AB28 I	D39
03	03		AB01 DA	
04	04			D02
05	05			
06	06		AB05 TO ??	
07	07	cf. 04		D02
08	08		AB80 MA	
09	09		AB04 TE ?	D35
10	10	cf. 04		D02
11	11		AB31 SA ??	D19
12	08	cf. 08	AB80 MA	
13	13		AB06 NA ??	D23
14	14	Root?		
15	15		A338 ?	

Note that reading top to bottom, right to left after turning the inscription counterclockwise gives a different sequence and numbering of the glyphs.
