= Toporzeł =

Fascist symbol in Poland

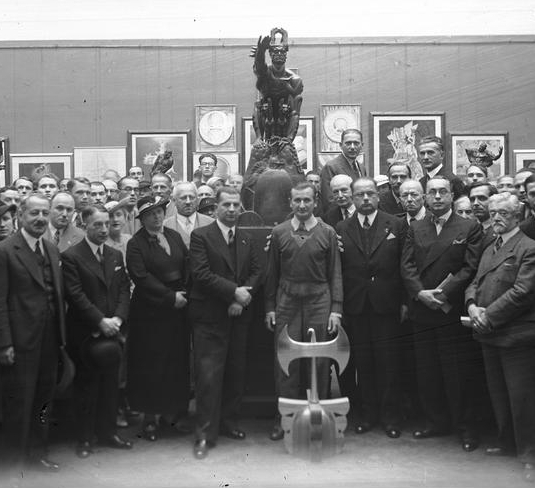
- Szukalski (centre right) with the Toporzeł, 1936
- Adopted: 1935
- Designer: Stanisław Szukalski

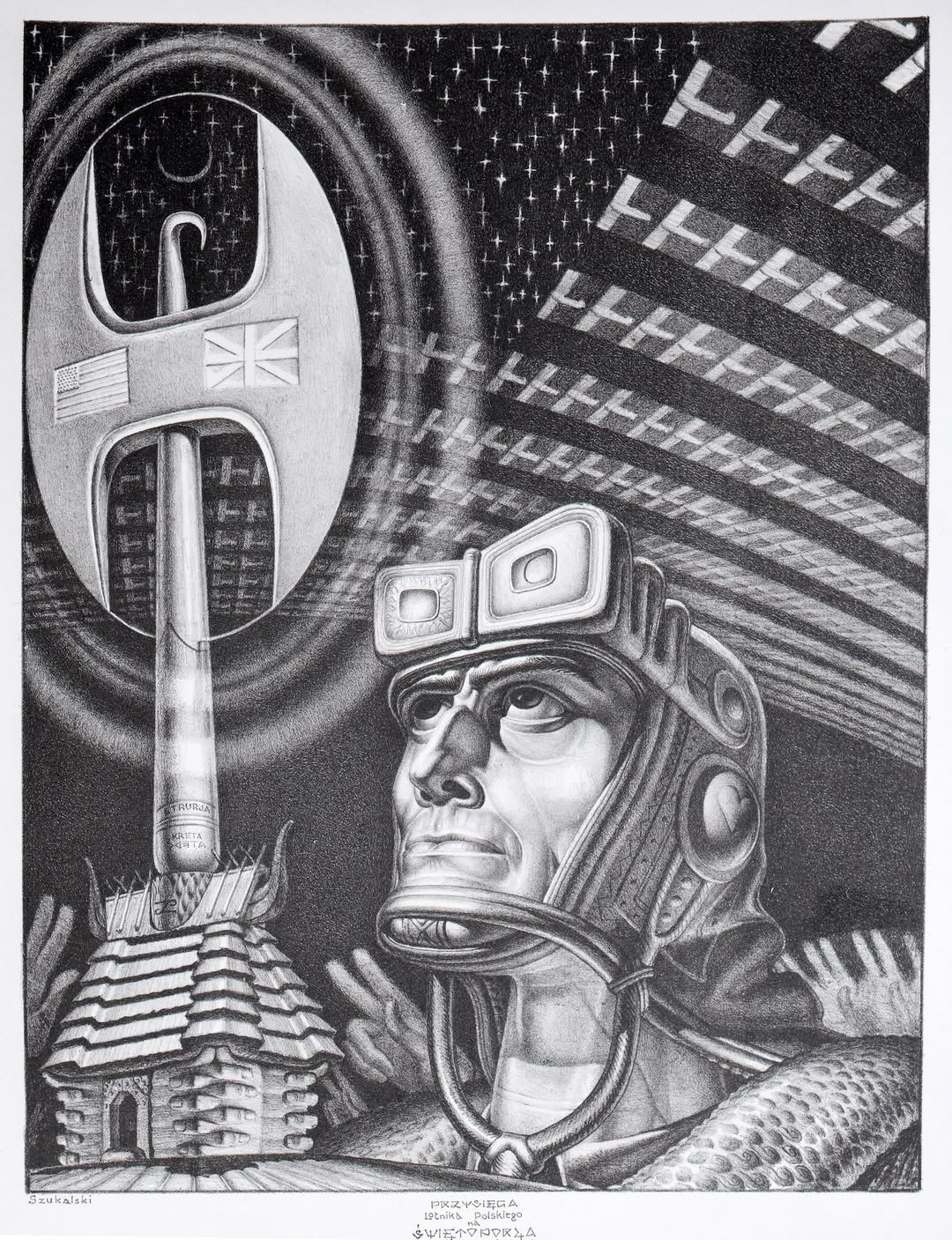
1940 lithograph depicting the Toporzeł.

The Toporzeł is an emblem created by Stanisław Szukalski in 1935 to replace the traditional White Eagle of Poland. The Toporzeł was created through a combination of the axe and eagle (topór and orzeł). The head has the form of a hook shaped like an eagle's head, symbolising a break with tradition. A symbol based on the Toporzeł, but with a cross instead of an eagle's head, the Topokrzyż, appeared in Szukalski's magazine Krak. It bore the inscription GOJ - Gospodarczą Organizujmy Jedność and was intended by the author to be used to mark non-Jewish shops. At the beginning of 1940, in German- occupied Warsaw, the symbol was used by Polish antisemites from the paramilitary Atak group to mark Christian shops, in order to economically boycott Jews.

Therefore, I am bringing you a beautiful sign, a new Eagle, even simpler than the Piast, so that you, who are possessed, are also you, the intention of the mission of the Rodoslawi; with an open heart they adopted on their banners, a sincere confession of national and racial patriotism, this is the sign of Topor, which became the Eagle. Let the Axor give us all, regardless of the different paths of attaining to the same Ideal, inspiration is needed today

— S. Szukalski
