= Stanisław Trzeciak =

Polish Catholic priest and Nazi collaborator (b. 1873, d. 1944)

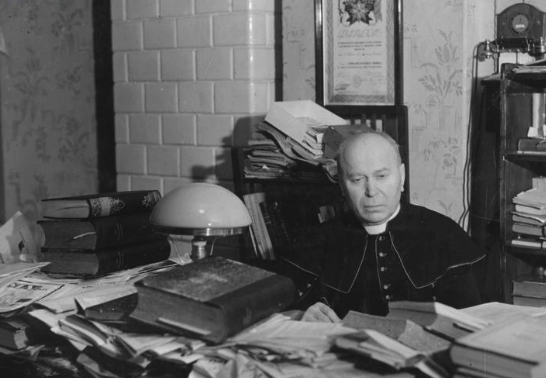
- Born: 25 October 1873; Rudna Wielka, Kingdom of Galicia and Lodomeria, Austria-Hungary
- Died: 8 August 1944 (aged 70); Warschau, General Government
- Cause of death: Execution by shooting
- Known for: Founding member of the NOR

Stanisław Trzeciak (25 October 1873 – 8 August 1944) was a Polish Catholic priest, social activist, doctor of theology and professor.

== Early life ==
On May 2, 1923, Trzeciak was awarded the Officer's Cross of the Polonia Restituta. In the 1930s, he received the Order of the German Eagle from German Chancellor Adolf Hitler for his exceptionally humane attitude towards German prisoners of war during World War I.

Trzeciak is considered the leading theoretician of antisemitic action in Poland.

== World War II ==
In October 1939, Trzeciak was a founding member of the pro-German, anti-Soviet, and antisemitic National Radical Organization. After the Easter pogrom, however, he decided to form a more moderate faction. During the German occupation of Poland in World War II, he maintained friendly relations with the Germans, which he used to help his friends. Thanks to his friendly relations with the Germans, he managed to save colonel Ignacy Oziewicz from the camp in Kulautuva, Lithuania. His antisemitic articles were published by occupying forces and quotations from his books were placed on Nazi posters.

According to the reports by the Home Army, Trzeciak was a collaborator with the Gestapo. On 22 March 1941, he denounced Tadeusz Puder, a priest of Jewish origin. As a result of denunciation, Puder was arrested on charges of not carrying an armband, which, according to German decrees, should be worn by all Jews. On September 1, 1941, he was sentenced to one year and eight months in prison.

During the Warsaw Uprising, Trzeciak tried to shelter a number of refugees in his church. Shortly after, he and several others were shot by German soldiers on 8 August.
