= Knossos board game =

Minoan board game

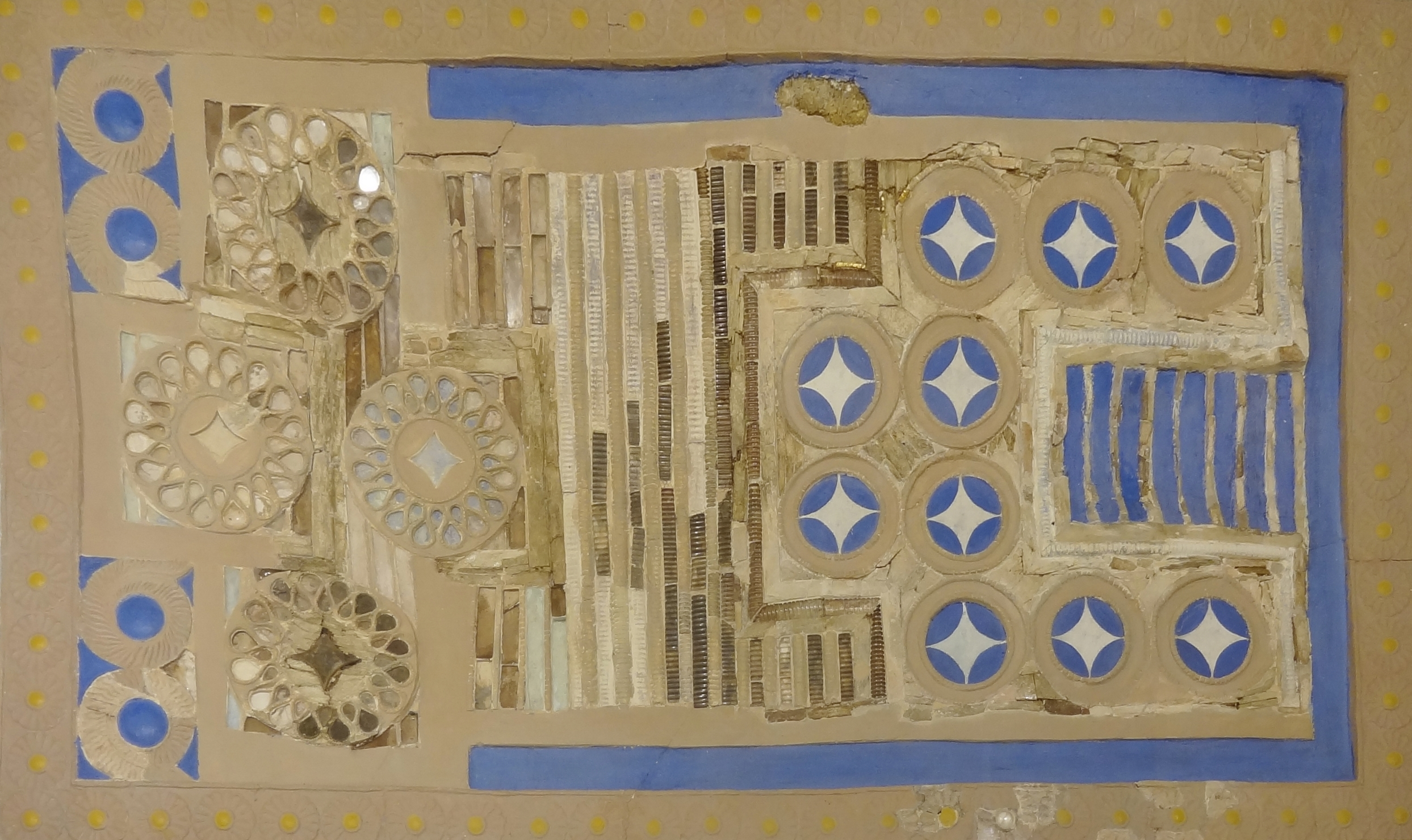
- Created: c. 1600 BC
- Discovered: 1900; Heraklion, Crete, Greece
- Discovered by: Sir Arthur Evans
- Present location: Heraklion, Crete, Greece

The Knossos board game (Greek: Ζατρίκιον; zatrikion) is a unique archaeological object belonging to the Minoan civilization that is preserved in the Archaeological Museum of Heraklion.

It was found by Sir Arthur Evans in the archaeological excavations of Knossos, in an area to the northeast of the palace that has since been called the "corridor of the zatrikion". It is dated to the time of the second palaces (between 1700 and 1500 BC). It is a rectangular piece, made on a wooden base with valuable materials such as ivory, rock crystal, glass paste, gold and silver.

Four cone-shaped ivory pieces were found next to the board, which were probably part of the game.
