= Labrys =

Cretan double-bladed axe

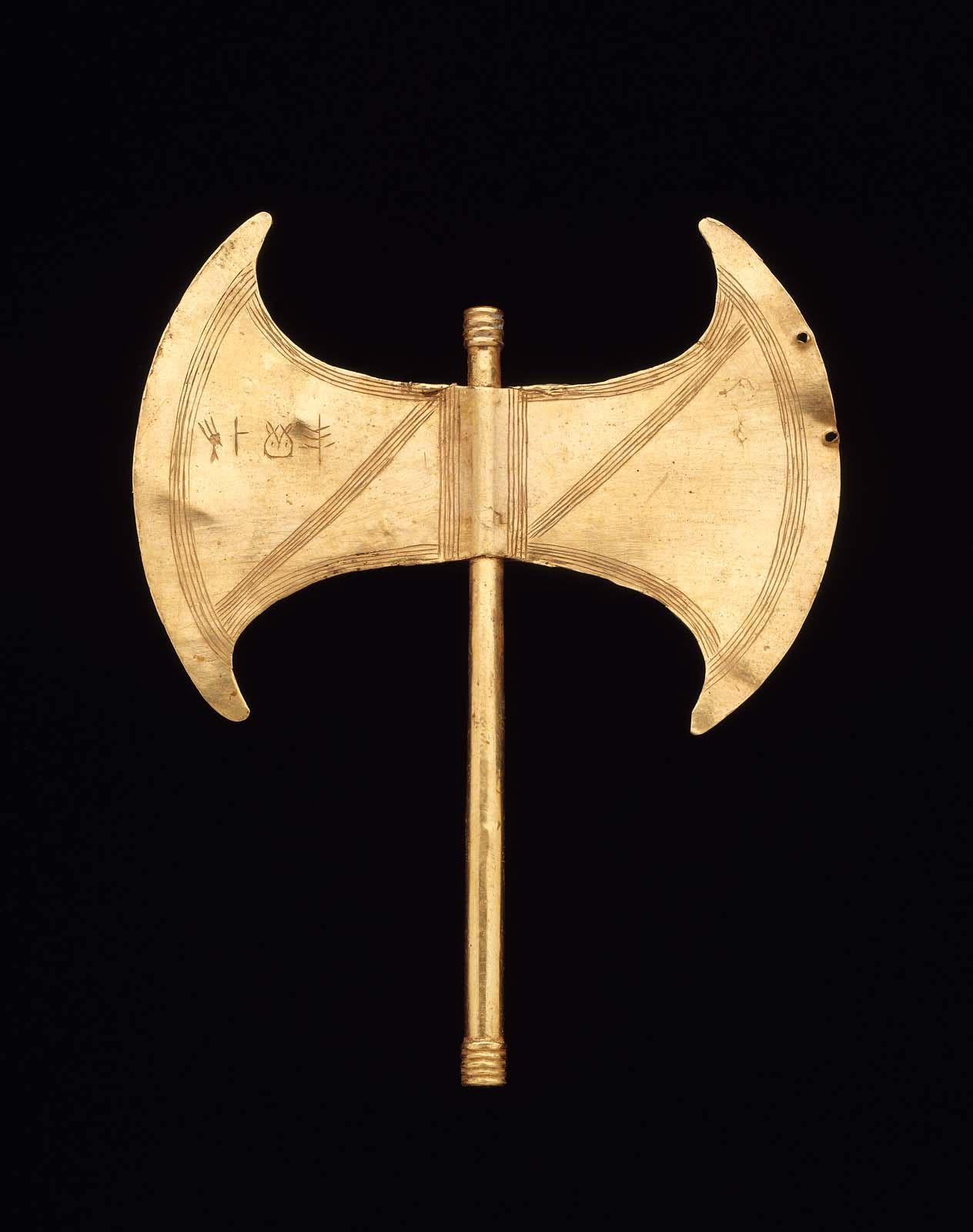
Minoan gold votive double axe or labrys, c. 1550-1500 BC. Less than 4 inches tall. On the left blade is an inscription in undeciphered Linear A; possibly an invocation to the goddess Demeter.

A labrys (Greek: λάβρυς, romanized: lábrys) (plural labryes (λάβρυες)) is a kind of double-bitted axe that traces back to the Minoan civilization of Crete. Originally a sacred symbol of the Minoan religion, it was adapted by numerous other ancient religions and cultures. It became a symbol in Thracian religion; a symbol for Zeus Labrandos in the Greek religion; and entered Greek and Roman myths. In modern times, the labrys is still used in forestry and in axe throwing. It has also become a symbol used by various modern political, social, and religious movements. It served as a symbol in Vichy France and some far-right movements in the mid-20th century. Its most prominent current use is as a symbol of lesbian feminism and in some neo-pagan religions.

== Etymology ==
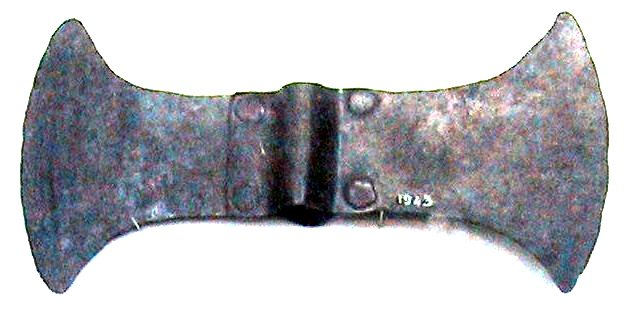
Bronze Age axe from the tholos tombs of Messara in Crete

Plutarch relates that the word labrys was a Lydian word for 'axe': Λυδοὶ γὰρ 'λάβρυν' τὸν πέλεκυν ὀνομάζουσι. (Note: "Herakles, having slain Hippolyte and taken her axe away from her with the rest of her arms, gave it to Omphale. The kings of Lydia who succeeded her carried this as one of their sacred insignia of office and passed it down from father to son until it was passed to Candaules, who disdained it and gave it to one of his companions to carry. When Gyges rebelled and was making war upon Candaules, Arselis came with a force from Mylasa to assist Gyges; Arselis then slew Candaules and his companion and took the axe to Caria with the other spoils of war. And, having set up a statue of Zeus, Arselis put the axe in his hand and invoked the god, Labrandeus.") ("For Lydians name the double-edged axe 'Labrys'"). Many scholars including Arthur Evans assert that the word labyrinth is derived from labrys and thus implies 'house of the double axe'. A priestly corporation in Delphi was named Labyades; the original name was probably Labryades, servants of the double axe. In the Roman era at Patrai and Messene, a goddess Laphria was worshipped, commonly identified with Artemis. Her name was said to be derived from the region around Delphi.

In Crete the "double axe" is not a weapon, and it always accompanies female goddesses, not male gods, referring to the male bull god itself. Robert S. P. Beekes regards the relation of labyrinth with labrys as speculative, and rather proposes a relation with laura (λαύρα), 'narrow street', or with the Carian theonym Dabraundos (Δαβραυνδος).

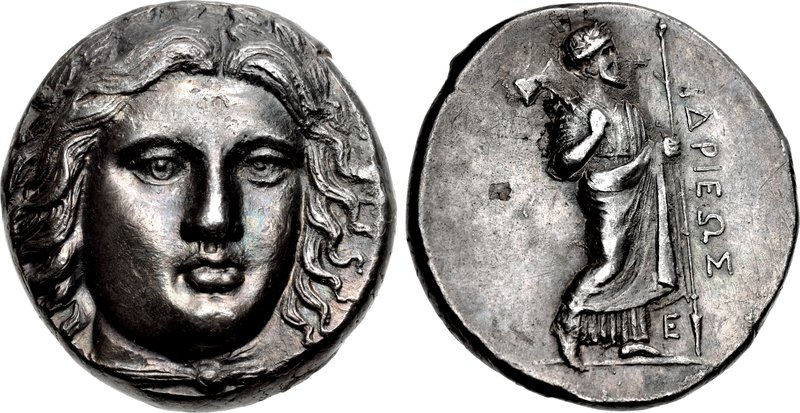
Coinage of Idrieus of Caria, Obv: Head of Apollo, wearing laurel wreath, drapery at neck; Rev: legend ΙΔΡΙΕΩΣ ("IDRIEOS"), Zeus Labraundos standing with labrys in his right hand, c. 351–350 to 344–343 BCE

It is also possible that the word labyrinth is derived from the Egyptian, meaning: "the temple at the entrance of the lake". The Egyptian labyrinth near Lake Moeris is described by Herodotus and Strabo. The inscription in Linear B, on tablet ΚΝ Gg 702, reads 𐀅𐁆𐀪𐀵𐀍𐀡𐀴𐀛𐀊 (da-pu_{2}-ri-to-jo-po-ti-ni-ja). The conventional reading is λαβυρίνθοιο πότνια (labyrinthoio potnia; 'mistress of the labyrinth'). According to some modern scholars it could read *δαφυρίνθοιο (*daphyrinthoio), or something similar, and hence be without a certain link with either the λάβρυς or the labyrinth.

A link has also been posited with the double axe symbols at Çatalhöyük, dating to the Neolithic age. In Labraunda in Caria, as well as in the coinage of the Hecatomnid rulers of Caria, the double axe accompanies the storm god Zeus Labraundos. Arthur Evans notes,

It seems natural to interpret names of Carian sanctuaries such as Labranda in the most literal sense as the place of the sacred labrys, which was the Lydian (or Carian) name for the Greek πέλεκυς [pelekys], or double-edged axe

and

on Carian coins, indeed of quite late date, the labrys, set up on its long pillar-like handle, with two dependent fillets, has much the appearance of a cult image.

== Minoan double axe ==
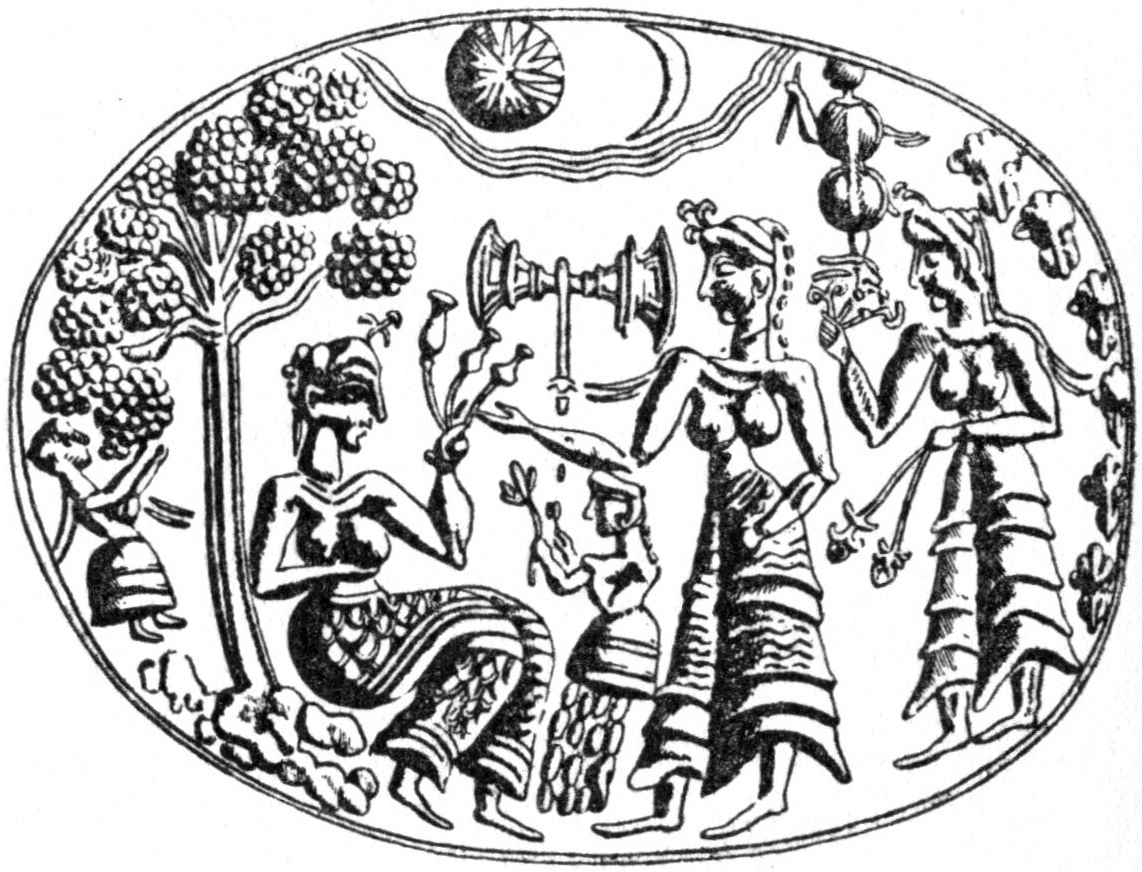
Drawing of a golden ring found at Mycenae depicting cult of the seated poppy goddess, in which the labrys is central and prominent

In ancient Crete, the double axe was an important sacred symbol of the Minoan religion. In Crete the double axe only accompanies goddesses, never gods. It seems that it was the symbol of the arche of the creation (Mater-arche). Small versions were used as votive offerings and have been found in considerable numbers; the Arkalochori Axe is a famous and rather larger example. Minoan double axes have also recently been found in the prehistoric town of Akrotiri (Santorini Island) along with other objects of apparent religious significance.

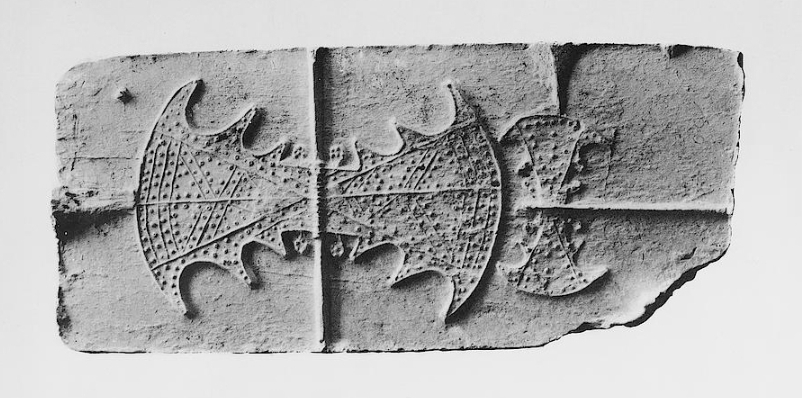
Minoan mould from Palaikastro

== Ancient Thracian Odrysian Kingdom ==
The double axe apparently carried important symbolism the ancient Thracian Odrysian kingdom related to the Thracian religion and to royal power. It is argued that in ancient Thrace the double axe was an attribute of Zalmoxis. The double axe appears on coins from Thrace and is believed to be the symbol of the kings of the Odrysae, who believed they could trace their lineage to Zalmoxis. A fresco from the Thracian tomb near Aleksandrovo in south-east Bulgaria, dated to c. 4th c. BCE, depicts a large-size naked man wielding a double axe.

== Double axes in the Near East ==
In the Near East and other parts of the region, eventually, axes of this sort often are wielded by male divinities and appear to become symbols of the thunderbolt, a symbol often found associated with the axe symbol. In Labraunda of Caria the double-axe accompanies the storm-god Zeus Labraundos. Similar symbols have been found on plates of Linear pottery culture in Romania. The double-axe is associated with the Hurrian god of sky and storm Teshub. His Hittite and Luwian name was Tarhun. Both are depicted holding a triple thunderbolt in one hand and a double axe in the other hand. Similarly, Zeus throws his thunderbolt to bring a storm. The labrys, or pelekys, is the double axe Zeus uses to invoke storm and, the relatively modern Greek word for lightning is "star-axe" (ἀστροπελέκι astropeleki) The worship of the double axe was kept up in the Greek island of Tenedos and in several cities in the south-west of Asia Minor, and it appears in later historical times in the cult of the thunder god of Asia Minor (Zeus Labrayndeus).

== Ancient Greece ==
In the context of the mythical Attic king Theseus, the labyrinth of Greek mythology is frequently associated with the Minoan palace of Knossos. This is based on the reading of Linear B da-pu_{2}-ri-to-jo-po-ti-ni-ja as λαβυρίνθοιο πότνια ("mistress of the labyrinth"). (Note: Cf. the parallel construction of a-ta-na-po-ti-ni-ja, perhaps referring to the "Mistress of Athens", i. e. Athena, on a different tablet (KN V 52) from Knossos.) It is uncertain, however, that labyrinth can be interpreted as "place of the double axes" and moreover that this should be Knossos; many more have been found, for example, at the Arkalachori Cave, where the famous Arkalochori Axe was found.

On Greek coins of the classical period (e.g. Pixodauros) a type of Zeus venerated at Labraunda in Caria that numismatists call Zeus Labrandeus (Ζεὺς Λαβρανδεύς) stands with a sceptre upright in his left hand and the double-headed axe over his shoulder.

== Roman Crete ==
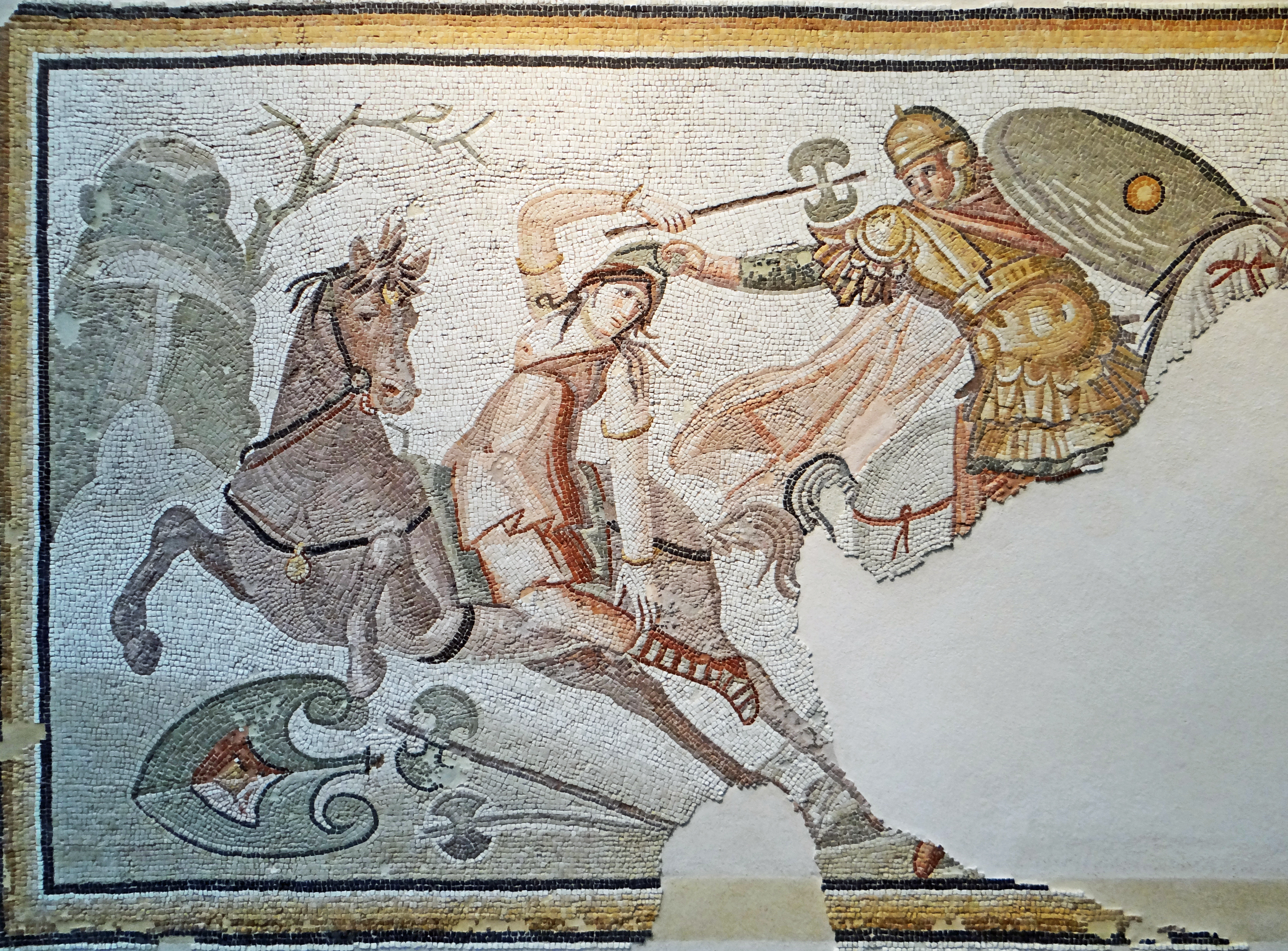
Ancient Roman mosaic in the Louvre depicting an Amazon warrior with labrys in combat with a hippeus, fourth century A.D., from Daphne, a suburb of Antioch (modern Antakya, Turkey)

In Roman Crete, the labrys was often associated with the mythological Amazons.

== Modern uses ==
=== Weapon ===
While double axes are common in modern high fantasy settings, in reality they were not commonly used in combat.

=== Sport ===
Double-bit axes were common in North American forestry: One blade would be sharp and used for felling, whilst the other was a little blunter for limbing. As the forest workers (lumberjacks) were often away from civilization for long periods of time they needed a way to amuse themselves. Thus the sport of double-bit axe throwing was born. In recent decades the sport has been formalised with Swedish company Gränsfors Bruks writing the rules most widely accepted. There are now multiple clubs across Europe that throw double-bit. The sport of double-bit was formalised in the 1990s, whereas hatchet throwing was formalised in 2006.

== Symbolism ==
=== Religion and spirituality ===
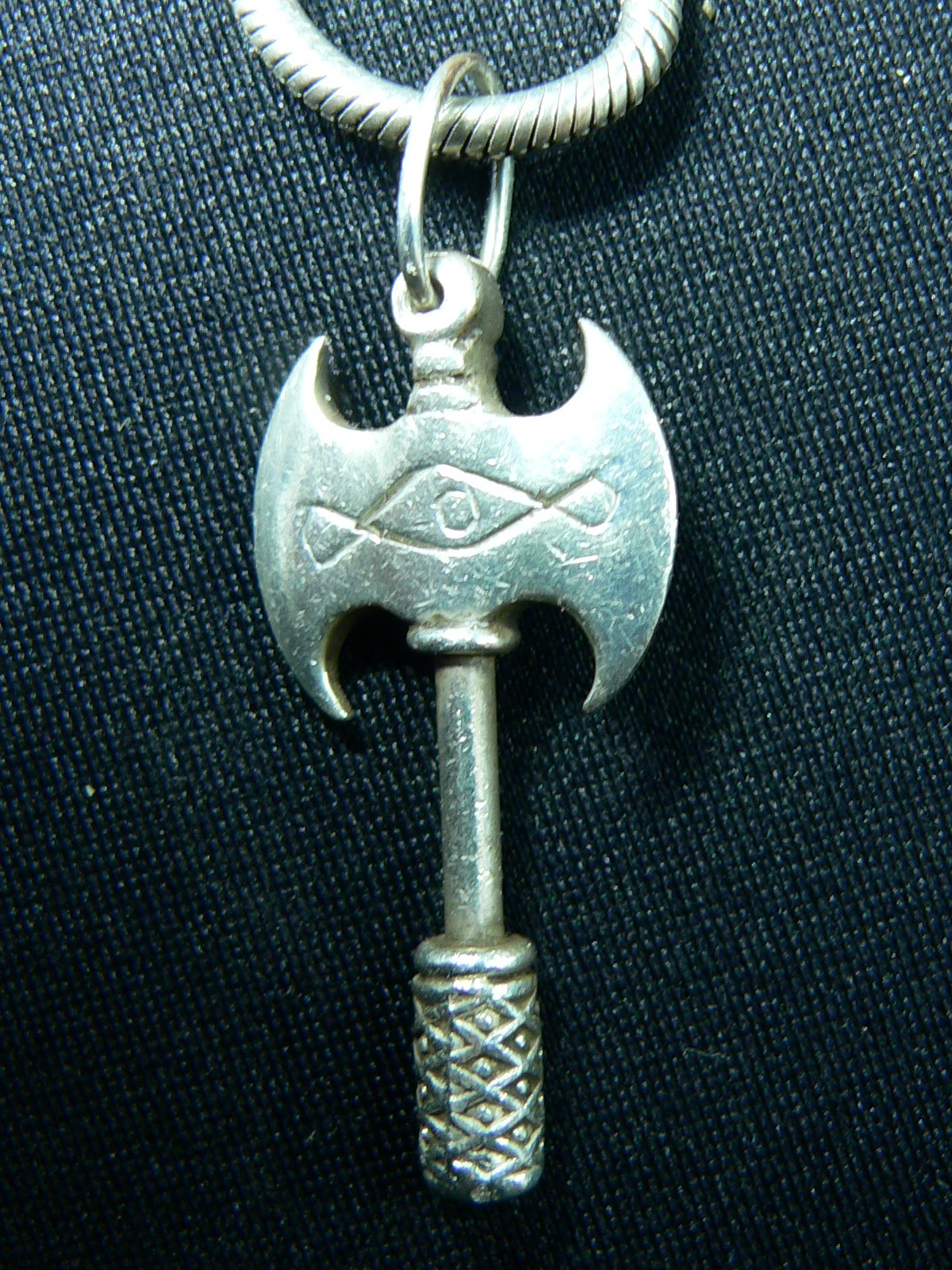
Labrys jewelry of modern pagan and feminist movements

The labrys is sometimes used as a symbol of Hellenic polytheism. As a symbol of the neopagan Goddess movement, the labrys represents the memory of pre-patriarchal matristic societies. (Note: "Women fought, as war leaders and in the ranks; women fought in troops, as regular soldiers; and the principal symbol of the Great Goddess, appearing widely throughout the Mediterranean and Asia Minor, was the double-headed battle axe or labrys.")

=== Political ===
In Greece, the labrys was employed as a symbol of Metaxism. During the totalitarian period of the 4th of August Regime (1936–1941), it represented the regime-sponsored National Organization of Youth (EON), as its leader, Ioannis Metaxas, believed it to be the first symbol of all Hellenic civilizations.

The labrys symbol was also used prominently by the Vichy France regime, with the symbol, erroneously called a Francisque, being featured on the personal flag of Chief of State Philippe Pétain, on coins, and in various propaganda posters.

The labrys used by Phillipe Pétain

In the 1960s the labrys was also used by the Italian neo-fascist and far-right movement Ordine Nuovo, most prominently on their flag.

=== Social movement ===
In feminist interpretations, the labrys is a symbol of matriarchy and female empowerment. (Note: The forms taken by the labrys were classified by Caterina Mavriyannaki.)

=== Lesbian symbol ===
Labrys lesbian flag

In the 1970s, the labrys was adopted by the lesbian community, as a lesbian feminist symbol, representing strength and self-sufficiency. The symbol is described to represent a butterfly and the labia, and is seen as an embodiment of the female spirit.

The lesbian flag, created in 1999 by Sean Campbell, depicts a labrys superimposed on an inverted black triangle and set against a violet background.

The labrys has been seen as having been co-opted by the trans-exclusionary radical feminism movement in the early 2000s, but some trans lesbians have since reclaimed the symbol.

The labrys is incorporated into the logo of The Charlotte Museum, a lesbian museum in Auckland, New Zealand. "Labrys" is the name of an LGBT rights organization in Kyrgyzstan. The group's goal is to improve the quality of life for all LGBT individuals in their country as well as Central Asia. Similarly, Labrisz is an association in Hungary for lesbian and bisexual women.

== See also ==
- Arkalochori Axe
- Axe (tool)
- Battle axe
- Bronze Age sword
- Fasces
- Francisca
- Labrys religious community
- Sagaris
