= Palmiry Memorial =

WWII cemetery in Palmiry, Poland

Coordinates: 52.3337°N 20.7445°E

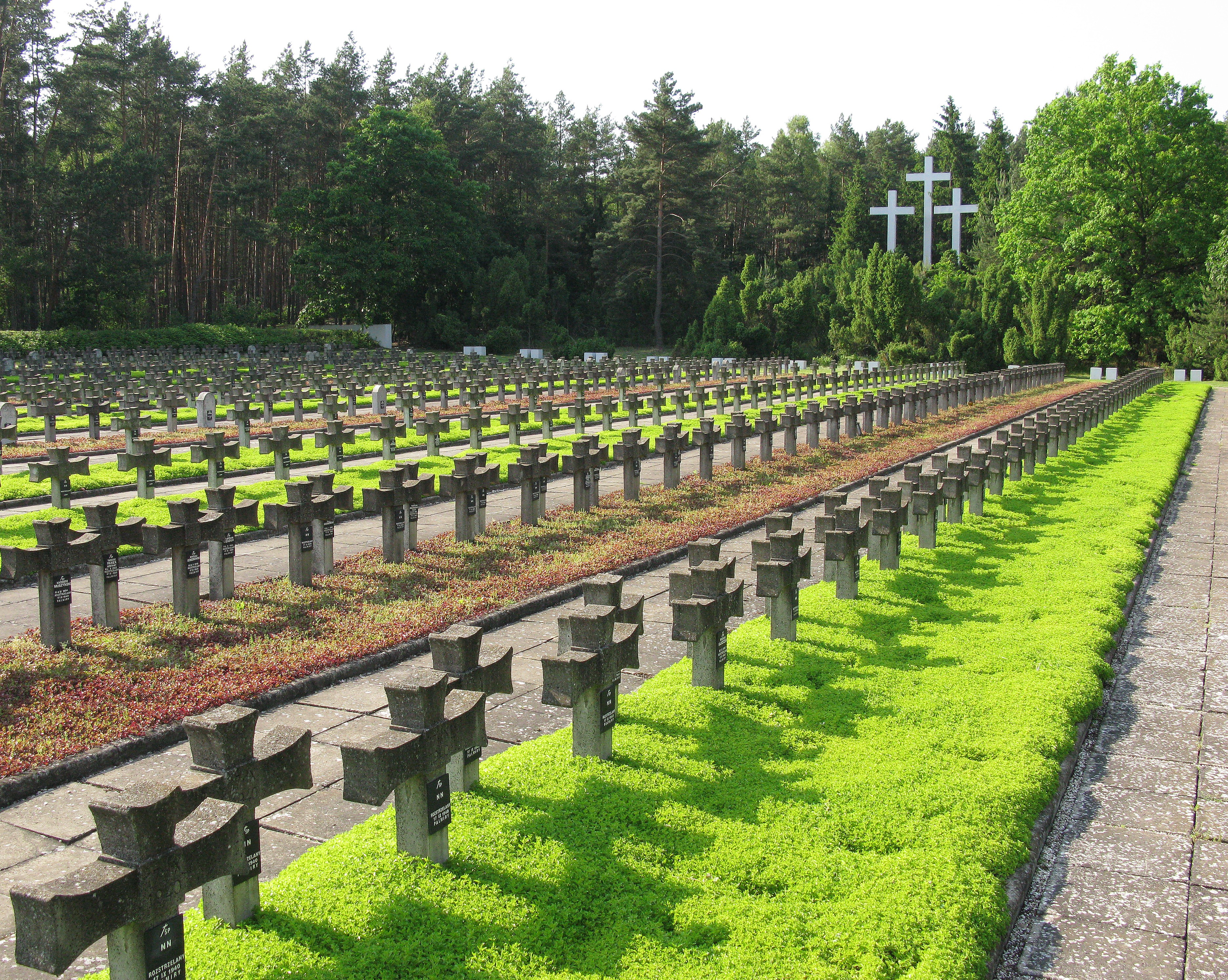
Palmiry Cemetery and Memorial in Summer 2010

The Polish Memorial in Palmiry was established in 1948. It is located in a forest near the village of Palmiry (Czosnów) within the Kampinos National Park in the Masovian Voivodeship. During the German occupation of Poland between 1939 and 1943, the Gestapo and SS units carried out secret mass shootings of the Polish civilian population here. The memorial is located near the former mass graves.

== History ==
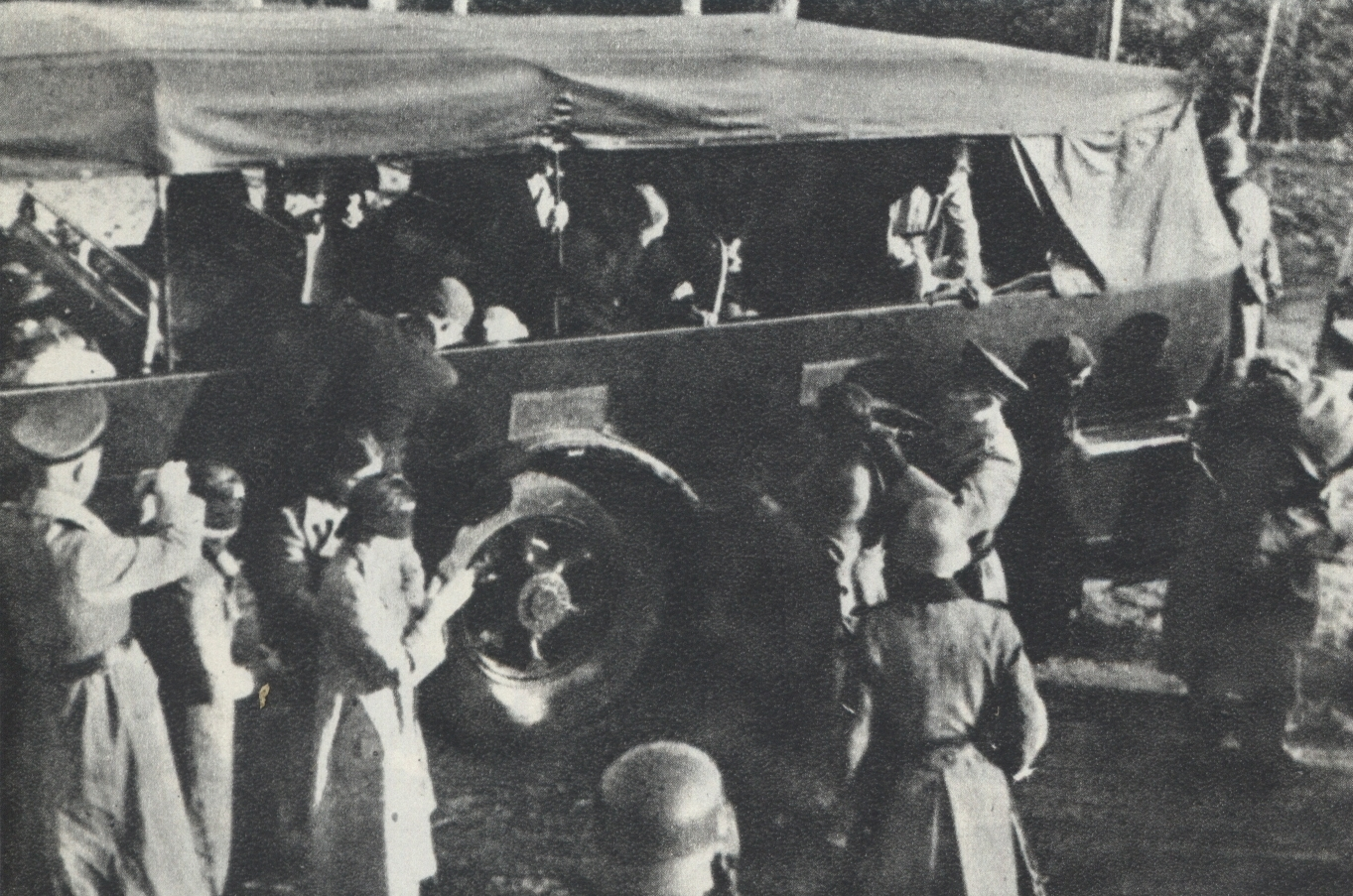
Transport of prisoners to the Palmiry shooting site in 1940, recorded by the Polish underground movement.

Before the Second World War, ammunition was stored here, which is why the local population called the area "Po wybuchu" (powder keg). These camps, originally part of the Modlin fortress, supplied ammunition to the Polish defence forces during the siege of Warsaw in September 1939. The ammunition depot was equipped with a railway connection. In the first months of occupation, the facility, including the tracks, were dismantled by German units. The surrounding forest was cleared. A clearing was created which was to become a secret place of execution. Shootings were carried out here for the first time on 14 December 1939.

The executions in Palmiry were carefully planned by the Gestapo deployed in Warsaw. A few days before the transport, a department of the Reich Labour Service, located in nearby Łomna, sometimes also units of the Hitler Youth camping near Palmiry, excavated pits suitable for mass graves in the clearing. These pits were about 2.5 m deep and 30 m long. The victims to be shot were usually taken from the Warsaw Pawiak prison, and rarely from the Mokotów prison in Rakowiecka Street on trucks to Palmiry. Most of the Poles murdered here belonged to the Polish Inteligencja. The climax of the shootings was reached within the framework of the Poland-wide AB Actions.

The prisoners were allowed to take their personal belongings with them – allowing them to be reassured, and later on these objects helped with the identification. Upon arrival at the execution site, they had to line up in front of the pits and were shot with machine guns. The filled pits were planted with pines. In spite of the extensive cordoning off of the site and the highest level of secrecy, the Polish underground movement knew of the massacres taking place near Palmiry as early as winter 1939. Polish forest workers were able to document the events and mark the mass graves. Under the forester Adam Herbański, trees were marked at night which later helped to find the graves again later.

From 25 November 1945 to autumn 1946 the Polish Red Cross carried out the exhumation of the bodies in the presence of representatives of the Main Commission for the Investigation of Nazi Crimes in Poland. 24 mass graves were found in an area of 1.5 km². The total number of victims shot and buried at Palmiry is not exactly known. Depending on the sources, there were between 2,115 (exhumed) and 2,255 persons, many of them of Jewish descent. About 20% were women. Among those murdered here were Olympic medal winners Janusz Kusociński and Tomasz Stankiewicz, chess master Dawid Przepiórka, university professors Stefan Kopeć and Kazimierz Zakrzewski, politicians Henryk Brun, Helena Jaroszewicz, Mieczysław Niedziałkowski, Stanisław Piasecki, Maciej Rataj (Sejmmarschall) as well as mayors Mikołaj Bożym, Adolf Kutkowski, Mieczysław Markowski and Jan Pohoski.

== Memorial today ==
The exhumed corpses were buried in a new cemetery near the mass graves. Today, this cemetery forms the core of the Palmiry memorial, which has existed since 1948. In 1973 the Museum of Struggle and Martyrdom (Polish: "Muzeum Walki i Męczeństwa") was opened here, where documents and artifacts from the exhumation but also the activities of the Polish underground movement in the area are exhibited. This museum has been under the control of the Warsaw Museum since 1980. On 9 July 2004, a storm caused considerable damage to the trees of the entire complex, which could only be repaired by soldiers of the Warsaw garrison in spring 2005. In 2009, a competition for the construction of a new museum building was announced.

German Chancellor Gerhard Schröder visited the memorial site during his visit to Warsaw in 1999 and laid a wreath there.

In the United States Holocaust Memorial Museum in Washington, D.C., a Palmiry tree stump was used as a design element.

== Literature ==
- Władysław Bartoszewski: Der Todesring um Warschau, 1939–1944, Interpress, Warszawa 1969, pp. 38–85.
