= Easter Pogrom =

Antisemitic attacks on Jews in Nazi-occupied Poland

The Easter Pogrom was a series of assaults on the Jewish populations of Warsaw and Kraków, Poland, between 22 and 30 March 1940, while Poland was occupied by the Germans in World War II.

The incident was provoked by an allegation of a murder of a child who had stolen from Jews. The story caused violence against Jews despite appeals from Polish underground organizations for calm. The worst excesses took place in Warsaw's Powiśle and Praga districts. About 500 persons participated in the riots, including activists and sympathizers of the Polish collaborationist, pro-Nazi National Radical Organization (NOR). NOR's activists used the slogan, "Long live Poland without Jews."
