= Znak (association) =

Znak (Polish: Sign, Symbol) was an association of lay Catholics in Poland, active between 1956 and 1976.

It was created as one of several smaller groups that split from the communist-controlled association PAX of Bolesław Piasecki in 1956. It was granted with several seats in the Polish Sejm and was intended as a link between the Catholic Church and the state. As such, it was allowed to cooperate with various Western European catholic movements, among them the German section of the International Catholic Peace Movement Pax Christi.

It was composed of the members of Klub Inteligencji Katolickiej (Club of Catholic Intelligentsia) and journalists of the newspaper Tygodnik Powszechny. Among the most prominent members of Znak were:

- Tadeusz Mazowiecki
- Jerzy Zawieyski
- Stefan Kisielewski
- Stanisław Stomma
- Wanda Pieniężna
- Janusz Zabłocki

During the March 1968 Events, an antisemitic and anti-intelligentsia campaign of Władysław Gomułka, Znak was the only political organisation in Sejm to protest. In 1976, the only member of Znak in the Sejm, Stanisław Stomma, abstained from voting and was one of only two Members of Parliament not to approve the amendment of Polish constitution underlining the leading role of the communist party and the "eternal friendship" with the Soviet Union. As a reprisal, Znak was disbanded.

A remainder of the group existed until 1980 when it was renamed to Polski Związek Katolicko-Społeczny, which like the Znak had representatives in the Sejm and continues today as a Catholic charity organisation that was notable for its opposition to martial law in Poland.
