= Polish anti-religious campaign =

20th-century Communist campaign

The Polish anti-religious campaign was initiated by the communist government of the Polish People's Republic; under the doctrine of Marxism, this government actively advocated for the disenfranchisement of religion and for planned atheization. (Note: "Planned atheisation afflicted all areas of activity of monastic communities [...] To victimise clergymen and consecrated people not only provisions of the criminal procedure were used, often violating not only the right for defence, but also basic human rights, allowing to use tortures in order to extort desired testimonies; also an entire system of legal norms, regulating the organisation and functioning of bodies of the judiciary, was used for victimising. Nuns also stood trials in communist courts, becoming victims of the fight of the atheist state against the Catholic Church. The majority of trials from the first decade of the Polish People's Republic in which nuns were in the dock had a political character. A mass propaganda campaign, saturated with hate, led in the press and on the radio, measured up against defendants, was their distinctive feature.") To this end, the regime used antireligious propaganda and persecuted clergymen and monasteries. As in most other communist countries, religion was not outlawed as such (except in the People's Socialist Republic of Albania) and was permitted by the constitution; nevertheless, the state attempted to achieve an atheistic society. The Catholic Church, as the faith of most Poles, was seen as a rival for citizens' allegiance by the government, which attempted to suppress it.

The Catholic Church in Poland provided strong resistance to the communist regime, and Poland itself had a long history of dissent toward foreign rule. The Polish nation rallied to the Church—as previously in the neighboring Lithuanian Soviet Socialist Republic—which made it more difficult for the regime to impose antireligious policies as in the USSR, where the populace was not in mass solidarity with the Russian Orthodox Church. The Catholic Church became the strongest opponent of the regime throughout the rule of communism in Poland, and it resisted more successfully than had religious bodies in most other communist states.

The Catholic Church unequivocally condemned communist ideology. This condemnation compelled the authorities to pursue antireligious activity in Poland in a more cautious and conciliatory way than in other communist countries; the authorities largely failed in their attempt to control or suppress the Polish Church.

== Communist takeover (1944–1956) ==
The predecessor to the communist government in Poland was the Polish Committee of National Liberation, which first took office in Soviet-occupied Lublin in 1944. This government initially gave favorable promises to the Catholic Church in Poland, including restoration of property that the Nazis had taken and exempting Church property from agrarian reform.

Polish experiences during and after World War II—wherein the large Jewish minority was annihilated by the Nazis; the large German minority was forcibly expelled from the country at the end of the war; and the eastern territories were lost, which had a significant population of Eastern Orthodox Belarusians and Ukrainians—caused Poland to become more homogeneously Catholic than before. After Soviet troops occupied Poland at the end of World War II, the Soviet-backed government enacted a gradual approach aimed at gaining control of the Catholic Church in Poland.

Despite engaging in conciliatory actions toward the Catholic Church, the government was already engaging in persecution. As the Red Army advanced into Poland, nuns were targeted by Soviet troops in multiple incidents, such as the death of 15 nuns in Braniewo.

After the end of World War II, the government permitted Catholic welfare services to resume operations, and it rebuilt damaged or destroyed churches at substantial public cost. During the first few years after the war, the Catholic Church in Poland was treated better than most other religious bodies in the newly Soviet-occupied states of Eastern Europe. This more lenient approach resulted from communism's lack of popularity among Poles, as well as the new regime's difficulty in presenting itself as the legitimate government of Poland; attacking the Church at this time, when it was well supported by most Poles, was considered too risky to attempt. Communist general Karol Świerczewski was given Catholic funeral rites; Polish radio broadcast Mass until 1947; and Bolesław Bierut's presidential oath in 1947 ended with the phrase 'so help me God'.

=== Policy of isolation ===
The Polish government made many concessions to the Church that antagonized Moscow; nevertheless, the campaign against the Church weakened the government's public support and made it dependent on the USSR. An important concession was the retention of religious instruction in schools, which was upheld as early as 1945; at the same time, the state attempted to limit and eliminate such instruction by other means.

Politician Bolesław Bierut belonged to a faction of the Polish Workers' Party (the Communist Party in Poland) that favored emulating the Soviet Union. (Politician Władysław Gomułka wanted to create a uniquely Polish system.) Bierut took control of the country in 1948 and attempted to turn Poland into a Stalinist state, wherein religion was actively discouraged in favor of communism. This attempt occurred during a period of generally increasing control and repression in Eastern Bloc countries. The regime sought to eliminate Catholicism and religion from the culture; to this end, the regime used several means: pursuing a policy of isolation from the Vatican, creating public opinion antagonistic to the Church, and provoking antagonisms within the Church itself by replacing religious leaders with regime collaborators. Marriage was secularized in 1945, and civil records were removed from the clergy's jurisdiction in 1949.

Polish society was prepared for the persecutions after 1945 because of its long history before the Bolshevik revolution of operating under regimes hostile to the country. Underground universities taught uncensored history and ethics lessons, and many people openly attended church. A letter by the Primate of Poland on elections, instructing Catholics not to support parties that opposed Catholic teaching, was suppressed in 1946.

=== "Patriot priests" ===
A notable feature of the antireligious campaign in Poland included "patriot priests" who opposed the Church hierarchy and supported communism. These priests were rewarded and sometimes allowed to travel to Rome. Some had experienced prison camps; some had been chaplains for the Red Army during World War II. Bishops often let these priests remain in their posts, though they were commonly ostracized by the laity; these priests failed to achieve much popular support. The state supported priests who collaborated with it; the remainder of the clergy was accused of reactionary activities, a lack of solidarity with the nation, and conspiracy with the Vatican.

The government achieved some success in these efforts: an estimated 1,700 out of 11,000 priests in Poland had attended conferences of the "progressives" by 1955. In 1949, Bolesław Bierut held a reception at the Belweder Palace in Warsaw for priests participating in a conference by the Union of Fighters for Freedom and Democracy (ZBoWiD). At this conference, some priests told Bierut that a lack of agreement between the hierarchy and the government made the clergy's work difficult. Bierut blamed this problem on the hierarchy: "the unfavorable attitude of higher Church authorities toward the People's state... In many cases, one can hear from priests...words which are often simply criminal, anti-state." Bierut gave cooperative priests privileges including vacations, financial support, tax exemption, and protection from punishments under canon law (which were permitted by the state).

Following this conference, a Commission of Priests attached to ZBoWiD was created; in the following year, this commission began publishing a biweekly titled Ksiądz obywatel (Citizen Priest), which was superseded that year by Kuźnica kapłańska (Priests' Forge). The commission held conferences in almost all provincial capitals. Young priests were forced to enroll in special classes on Marxism, in order to cause a schism within the Church.

In addition, the state attempted to penetrate the Church by creating several other organizations: the Polish Committee of Peace Partisans, the Catholic Social Club, and the Society of Children's Friends. A lay association, PAX, was founded under the leadership of Bolesław Piasecki, leader of a prewar fascist organization. PAX tried to remove Church members' obligation to obey hierarchy; the organization supported the regime's antireligious efforts, as well as an anti-Semitic campaign in the late 1960s.

The ZBoWiD priests' commission supported the peace movement; supported the government's protests against the remilitarization of West Germany; supported the planned economy; and stated that the country's new constitution fully conformed with moral principles and Christian conscience. The commission gained mass popularity by supporting Poland's retention of western territories that had been part of Germany. Nevertheless, the government failed to produce a schism in the Church because of a lack of popular support; therefore, it disbanded the organization in 1955, and it called on citizens instead to join the movement for peace partisans.

=== Bureau for Religious Affairs ===
In 1950, the Polish government created the Bureau for Religious Affairs, which had jurisdiction over personnel decisions and organizational functions.

The Main Commission of Intellectuals and Catholic Activists, attached to the Peace Committee of Polish Partisans, was founded in 1950; this commission originally comprised members of theological faculties, representatives from the Catholic University of Lublin, and active Church workers. In 1950, this group participated in the second International Peace Congress in Warsaw. In 1951, the commission sponsored the first national conference of clergy and laymen representing Catholic public opinion. This organization attempted to mold public opinion and formulate principles for the behavior of Catholics. The group actively promoted the peace movement, as well as government protests against remilitarization in West Germany, and it supported holding the western territories. The commission criticized the Catholic Church in West Germany for allegedly being exploited for anti-Polish purposes.

Another organization, called the Catholic Social Club, supported the regime and had representation in the Polish parliament; however, the club lacked popular support. It attempted to reconcile Catholic social teaching with dialectical materialism.

The Society of Children's Friends (TPD) was created by the Communist Party in 1949 to secularize the public school system; this society established kindergartens, primary schools, teachers' colleges, camps, and recreation centers for youth. A principal goal of the Society was to educate youth as atheists and regime supporters. By 1950, the TPD had established more than 500 schools. The Catholic Church actively opposed these attempts to remove religious instruction and Church influence from public schools, and it encouraged the faithful to support the Church in its opposition. By 1956, religious education in public schools was almost eliminated. The Soviet-style propaganda campaign created museums, associations, and publications devoted to atheism.

The official press launched a campaign to safeguard Poland from subversion (in reference to the Vatican). During its early years, the government conducted a propaganda campaign that depicted the Vatican and Polish hierarchy as Germanophiles; the Vatican refused to alter Poland's diocesan boundaries to mark the state's new territory.

The Vatican was often attacked in Polish propaganda as a negative influence on the country, and the government claimed that Poland had ceased to exist in the 18th century because the Vatican had weakened it. Propaganda also tried to link the Vatican with fascism, and it claimed that Pius XII was responsible for Francisco Franco's uprising in Spain, in addition to the Vichy regime in wartime France. Polish clergy loyal to the Vatican were also portrayed as fascists in this propaganda.

The Church signed an agreement with the government in 1950, after the 1925 concordat (agreement) was revoked by the government on the grounds that the Vatican had violated the concordat by supporting Germany during World War II. (The Vatican had allowed a German bishop in Danzig to have jurisdiction over Germans living in Poland.) The 1950 agreement was not approved by the Vatican. It contained some features favorable to the Church (which the government did not always observe in following years). These features permitted the following:

- Religious instruction in schools
- Religious instruction of children outside school
- Continued operation of the Catholic University of Lublin
- Persistence of Catholic organizations
- Existence of the Catholic press
- Continuation of public worship in churches
- Pilgrimages
- Religious processions
- Chaplaincy work in the armed forces
- Continued functioning of monastic orders
- Continued charity work by the Church

By contrast, many of these features had been outlawed in the neighboring USSR. In return, the state required the Church to submit politically and to condemn Catholic activities not permitted by the state.

=== Communist constitution ===
During the first few years of the communist government, persecution of individuals for religion was rare, because the state was initially concerned only with suppressing armed political resistance. From 1947 to 1953, the Catholic Church in Poland became the primary target of persecution in communist Poland. All social and charitable organizations affiliated with the Church were made illegal; Catholic schools were closed; crosses were removed from classrooms and hospitals; and a terror campaign was implemented against parishes and monasteries. Clergy started to be arrested and put on trial (including the notable arrest of a group of Jesuits headed by Father Tomasz Rostworowski). Many bishops were arrested or removed from their positions, with government-approved administrators then taking over the dioceses; in some cases, the government sent loyalists to "assist" a bishop in running his diocese. Approximately 900 priests were imprisoned. Nine priests were sentenced to death in 1949; in 1950, the Bonifratres Order and the Catholic charity Caritas were put on trial, and the Caritas trial led to government seizure that same year.

In July 1949, the Vatican published an order excommunicating Catholics who actively supported communism. In response, the Polish government called it an act of interference in the country's internal affairs; in addition, the government stated that clergy found trying to enforce the order (e.g., denying communion to excommunicated people) would be punished by state law. The new law passed for this purpose in 1949 guaranteed the right of antireligious propaganda, and it also declared a penalty ranging from three years' imprisonment to death for those who abused the right to freedom of religion for "purposes hostile to the system of the People's Republic".

The already-strained relations between the Vatican and the Polish government deteriorated after that time. The Polish government began to strike more actively at the Church: members of religious orders were required to register, as well as to provide accounts of their activities and assets, and Catholic publications were more severely suppressed. The Minister of Justice, commenting on the new legislation, stated his resentment of the Church as follows:

... the negative attitude of the hierarchy towards the People's Democracy, who during the five years of the existence of the regime, had shown not a single sign of appreciation of the achievements of the regime.... (the Church) had declined to combat capitalism, and had endeavored to undermine the enthusiasm for socialism.

Salesian schools (Catholic educational institutions) and orphanages were closed. All Church private schools were closed by 1950; this was accomplished by the authorities refusing to grant work permits to Catholic schools that applied for them. (Because religious instruction was still officially permitted, these methods were used instead to eliminate Catholic education.) Government-run private schools did not offer religious instruction; despite a provision in the 1950 agreement permitting religious instruction in schools, that right was being eroded. Marxism became an obligatory subject in the school system. Priests were dismissed from instructor positions for refusing to sign the Stockholm Peace Appeal, and nuns were barred from teaching in public schools; this led to a situation where other teachers were commonly unavailable to provide religious instruction. In some places, the religious instruction was removed because of the alleged demands from parents. By 1955, Poland's only Catholic institution of higher learning was the Catholic University of Lublin, which was being slowly liquidated by the regime. A total of 59 seminaries were closed between 1952 and 1956, and restrictions were imposed on training new priests. The Rozanystok seminary, established in 1949, was forcibly liquidated in 1954. It had been moved from Wilno, and it had been run by Salesians to train candidates for the priesthood and to provide Catholic education for boys. This seminary was situated in Eastern Poland; it employed former residents of the territory annexed by the USSR in 1939, and it caused significant concern for the government, provoking its brutal closure.

Much landed property was confiscated from the Church and affiliated organizations; the only land not taken was the farmholds of parish priests, provided that this land did not exceed 50 hectares [120 acres], or 100 hectares [250 acres] in some parts of the country. In addition, the government placed severe limitations on charitable activities associated with the Church, and the government took control of recording vital statistics. In 1950, all Church property was nationalized without compensation, except property that was used by parish priests for their own subsistence—though such land could not exceed 50 hectares (120 acres), and any income from such land needed to be used for religious and charitable purposes. This nationalization was accompanied by a state promise to set aside resources for the upkeep of parishes and clergy. The Church did not provide much resistance to this confiscation, thereby denying the communists any opportunity to attack the Church as an institution chiefly concerned with protecting its property (as Lenin had attempted with the Russian Orthodox Church). The government's confiscation caused the Church to become even more popular among the lower classes.

Two priests were sentenced in 1951 for participating in an underground organization opposed to the state; these priests provided ammunition for a new campaign, in which the government began liquidating the temporary ecclesiastical administration in the western (former German) territories and removed apostolic administrators from these areas. The Vatican began appointing Polish bishops to these bishoprics after this time.

In May 1951, the clergy and the government signed the National Charter for Peace Plebiscite; trials were subsequently conducted, notably including those against the Jesuit Order and the St Bernard Order (leading to two death sentences). Three Salesian bishops, who were severely attacked in official propaganda, disappeared in 1952; that same year, several priests in Kraków were arrested on charges of espionage and sabotage. In January 1953, five dignitaries—including Archbishop Baziak in Kraków—were arrested; public protests in Kraków were violently suppressed. In February 1953, four priests and three laymen were charged with espionage and put on trial. The government announced, under supposed pressure from public opinion aroused by the trial, that they needed to assume control of the Church. Therefore, the government required all ecclesiastical posts to receive government approval. The government used this power—as well as other measures aimed at controlling the Church's activities during those years—to weaken the Church in order to remove it from society.

Cardinal Primate of Poland Stefan Wyszyński attempted to circumvent this obstacle by gaining permission from the Vatican to relax canonical rules in order to appoint parish administrators instead of pastors, since parish administrators were not subject to the government veto. The government claimed that it seldom exercised its power of veto, but Cardinal Wyszyński reported that he was largely obstructed in appointing bishops. Wyszyński attempted to publish a letter protesting the government's treatment of the Church, and he was secretly arrested and put under house arrest (confined to a convent) in 1953. This process followed the arrest of other bishops before Wyszyński's arrest; including the primate, 11 bishops were arrested that year. These included the trial of the Bishop of Kielce, Czesław Kaczmarek, before a military tribunal in Warsaw (on charges of espionage). Subsequently, the remaining free bishops agreed to comply with the government's decree in February. Wyszyński's arrest later became public knowledge; the government offered to release him in 1955 if he stepped down from his post as Cardinal Primate.

The state tried to take control of the Polish Orthodox Church (POC)—with a membership of about half a million—in order to use it as a weapon against the Roman Catholic Church in Poland; the state attempted to control the person who was named as Metropolitan of the Polish Orthodox Church. Metropolitan Dionizy (Dionysius Waledyński; the postwar head of the POC) was arrested and retired from service after his release.

After the government came to power, several actions were taken: the prewar press legislation was abolished; the printing industry and plants were nationalized; and prepublication censorship was imposed. In July 1946, a government decree created the Central Office for Control of the Press, Publications, and Public Performances; all press and printing activities were controlled by this office. Poland's vast and diverse Catholic press network from the precommunist era was mostly eradicated, except for some publications that continued to exist under heavy censorship, a reduction in circulation, and a requirement to speak only on purely religious matters (as opposed to political or social matters). Catholic publications that still existed included the following:

- Tygodnik Warszawski, which defied the regime and closed in 1949
- Tygodnik Powszechny, whose editors resigned under pressure in 1953 after failing to produce a correct obituary for Stalin; pro-regime Catholics assumed control, but the old editors returned in 1956
- Dziś i Jutro, which attempted to promote the coexistence of Catholicism and communism

Such liberty was forbidden in other places in the Soviet bloc, including the USSR itself, which had banned church publications in 1929. The founders of Tygodnik Warszawski were incarcerated; these included Father Zygmunt Kaczyński and Antoni Antczak, who both died in prison. Cardinal Wyszyński attempted to intervene on behalf of Father Zygmunt.

Following the forced conversion of Eastern Catholics in the USSR to Orthodoxy, the Polish government called on the Orthodox Church in Poland to assume 'pastoral care' of Eastern Catholics in Poland. After Metropolitan Dionizy was removed from leadership of the POC, Metropolitan Macarius was placed in charge. He came from Western Ukraine (previously eastern Poland), where he had been instrumental in the compulsory conversion of Eastern Catholics to Orthodoxy. Polish security forces helped him to suppress resistance to his taking control of Eastern Catholic parishes. Many Eastern Catholics who remained in Poland after postwar border adjustments were resettled in Western Poland in the territories newly acquired from Germany. The state in Poland gave the POC more privileges than the Roman Catholic Church had in Poland; the state even gave money to the POC, though it often defaulted on promised payments, leading to a perpetual financial crisis for the POC.

In 1952, a new Polish constitution was created, which excluded previously given protections for religion and the position of the Church; this constitution was worded ambiguously enough to allow for almost any new law from the Sejm (lower house of parliament) not to contradict it.

== Period of political thaw (1956–1970) ==
A period of de-Stalinization occurred during the 1950s in the Eastern Bloc, as well as a recognition of the problems that communism faced with the unique situation in Poland; this process led to Gomułka returning to power. (He had previously been the country's leader before being replaced by Bierut in 1948.) The state lightened its restrictions on Eastern Catholic churches, which began to revive, partly with assistance from other Catholics. The state moved away from its attempt to control and manipulate the Church, as it had intended during its early years of existence, and it moved toward a strategy of combating the Church through legislation and force.

During the events of Polish October in 1956, the government was criticized by parts of the secular press; the loyalty of the Catholic press during that period was repaid by Gomułka, who lifted some restrictions on it. Cardinal Wyszyński and other bishops were released from prison; five Catholic deputies were allowed to enter the Sejm; and monks and nuns were allowed to return to their monasteries. A new agreement formed between the government and the Church, which resolved to remove previous antireligious measures and renewed the Church's allegiance to the state. However, this agreement was not honored: within a few years, Gomułka tightened his control and resumed restricting the Catholic press. This press was then rendered incapable of responding to arguments against the Church in the secular press.

In 1957, Cardinal Wyszyński attempted to publish a Vatican decree condemning Catholics who collaborated with the government, but his efforts were censored. Moreover, the Church could not voice any opposition to birth control or abortion in its press.

Abortion had initially remained restricted (as during the prewar period and most of Poland's history), but it was legalized in 1956; further executive provisions were passed in 1959 that broadened access to the procedure. The state also encouraged women to take a more active role in the paid labor force and in social life, partly in an attempt to undermine Church attitudes about the role of women in family life.

Catholic education returned to some extent in public schools after 1956, but it was no longer compulsory; previously, while it was officially compulsory, school authorities usually made it optional. Religious education was offered only in schools where a majority of parents requested it, and it was regarded as an extracurricular activity; as during earlier times, however, the state promptly took measures to erode this concession. All members of religious orders who taught in schools had their teaching licenses suspended, and many lay teachers were also suspended from teaching; these suspensions left many schools with no teachers of religion, and other indirect means were used to eliminate the legally permitted religious instruction in public schools. Approved teachers were subject to state inspection, and a curriculum required state approval. As the situation evolved, however, the state eventually eliminated religious instruction officially and legally in 1961.

During the seventh plenary session of the Central Committee that year, Gomułka stated:

The school in People's Poland is a lay school. Its task is to train enlightened, superstition-free and rationally thinking citizens. The state authorities will not create obstacles for parents who want their children to receive religious education. However, in the interest... of all parents - believers and non-believers alike - these children should receive religious instruction outside the school.

Despite Gomułka's statement, the state also created obstacles for teaching religion outside the schools. The government frequently declared that buildings that held religious classes were unsafe and these buildings were therefore not granted permits. The government also issued legislation to the following effect:

- Religious instruction would be limited to a maximum of two hours per week.
- Religious instructors would be made state employees. In response, the Church told the clergy not to register and accept a salary, in order to fulfill Jesus's commandment about teaching.
- Local school boards would control education.

These restrictions were at first reluctantly enforced. In 1964, however, new legislation allowed all buildings for religious instruction to be inspected for hygiene by the government, which reserved the right to shut them down on health grounds. Cardinal Wyszyński protested the implementation of this legislation; in rebuttal, the government said that it was concerned only with protecting students' health and safety.

Discriminatory policies were introduced against Catholics in both public and professional life. In 1959, new tax laws were approved that limited the scope of the term 'worship'; donations for purposes such as the primate's secretariat, seminaries, and Catholic charities were no longer tax-exempt. These laws led to the taxation of Church donations at the same level as private enterprise (65%). At one point, Church buildings in the western territories were nationalized as post-German assets, and high rents were charged for their use. Also in 1959, members of religious orders were no longer permitted to become parish priests or administrators; they were also discharged from service at hospitals, public nurseries, dispensaries, and kindergartens. Beginning in 1960, nuns were no longer permitted to study at universities or colleges. Many members of religious orders also had their declarations of residence refused by the state. These members generally saw their civil rights eroded through state discrimination.

Antireligious propaganda failed to achieve significant popularity among the Polish masses. Despite the pressure placed on the Church, the number of priests graduating from seminaries attained higher levels during the 1950s than during the prewar years.

From the 1960s onward, Poland developed an increasingly vocal Catholic intelligentsia and an active movement of young Catholics. The "Oasis" movement was created in the 1960s by Father Franciszek Blachnicki; it consisted of Church activities including pilgrimages, retreats, and various ecumenical endeavors. Intense efforts by the state to undermine this movement failed. During Pope John XXIII's pontificate, the regime successfully bypassed the Polish episcopate by negotiating directly with the Vatican, which allowed the government to isolate the Polish episcopate. When Paul VI became pope, he required any further negotiations to include the Polish episcopate.

In 1965, on the eve of the thousand-year anniversary of Poland's conversion to Christianity, the Polish episcopate made preparations by inviting foreign guests, including Pope Paul VI. In its letter to the German bishops, the episcopate controversially asked to forget the past; granted forgiveness to Germans for events during World War II; asked for Poles to be forgiven for these events as well; and stated that Poland had been a bulwark of Christianity. The Polish state took issue with the contents of the letter, which had not been cleared with the state before being sent. The letter was declared to be contrary to the interests of Polish foreign policy. Gomułka stated that declaring Poland as a bulwark of Christianity conflicted with Poland's relationship with the Soviet Union and struck at the foundations of Poland's foreign policy.

During this crisis, the Polish episcopate was also criticized in the press for making no progressive contribution to the Second Vatican Council; Cardinal Wyszyński was reproached for supposedly calling "for the condemnation of atheism, the preservation of the old, anti-socialist and pro-fascist social doctrine of the Church in all spheres of social life." To punish the Church for its behavior, several seminaries were closed, and seminarians were made subject to the military draft. Wyszyński was denied the privilege of traveling to Rome, and Paul VI was barred from attending the millennium celebrations. The government staged rival secular celebrations at the same time as the religious celebrations, in order to blunt enthusiasm for the religious celebrations.

Despite all of these challenges (and in contrast to the USSR), the number of parishes, priests, and nuns increased above precommunist levels. The postwar Church had 20,000,000 regular communicants. In 1968, following the student uprisings, the Church was criticized for providing moral support to so-called "anti-Polish" forces on account of its advocacy for human rights.

== Edward Gierek's decade in office (1970–1981) ==
Beginning in the early 1970s, the Church shifted stances from defensive to more aggressive when speaking in defense of human rights. In 1970, Edward Gierek became the new leader of Poland, and he initiated more relaxed policies on antireligious activity than his predecessors had. He established a personal working relationship with Stefan Wyszyński, and he authorized the construction of new churches and the resumption of instruction for priests in seminaries. In October 1977, he became the first Polish communist leader to travel to the Vatican and meet the pope (then Paul VI).

The security apparatus in Poland, as in other communist nations, recruited members of the clergy. The security service used blackmail, psychological manipulation, and a variety of material rewards (e.g., medicines needed for ill relatives) to secure the clergy's cooperation. Conversely, the security service and the Polish government had members who secretly provided beneficial information to the Church. In addition, Catholic youth were forced to enroll in Communist Youth organizations. In contrast to the Communist Party of the Soviet Union, which was staunchly atheist, believers made up the majority of the Polish United Workers' Party membership, with almost 50% of party members practicing their faith at church (as of 1980).

The state encouraged migration from rural areas to cities, partly in an attempt to weaken the Church's influence. School curricula were modified to include more Marxist-Leninist ideas; new superintendents sympathetic to the party were appointed; and classes were created for later in the afternoon to hinder children from receiving religious instruction afterward. The state increasingly changed its approach to gender relations (earlier used to attack the Church) in later decades; the role of women in the family was more strongly emphasized in official propaganda, and legislative measures were introduced to make it harder for women to find employment.

Atheism was never widely accepted in Poland (as it had been in the USSR); large numbers of Poles continued to believe and even to attend Mass. Religious indifference became more common than atheism, but it never achieved numbers larger than a small minority. At the same time, however, Catholic moral beliefs were eroded among believers, with increasing numbers of people rejecting Church teaching on abortion or matrimonial/familial relations. Many Catholics began thinking of morality as independent of religion, while rejecting the clergy's authority to issue direction about conscience.

Cardinal Primate of Poland Stefan Wyszyński believed that Poland had a special role to play in human history. He supported Polish nationalism as a precursor to liberating Eastern Europe from Soviet rule. Such ideas were popular among many Polish Catholics as well. Wyszyński entered into sharp conflict with the communist authorities because of this. He also experienced some conflict with the Vatican. Wyszyński was popular in Polish society, and he was defiantly referred to as 'interrex'. (Note: When Poland was an electoral monarchy, during the period after one monarch had died and before another was elected, the supreme power in the country was held by a Roman Catholic primate who was called 'interrex'. This title therefore implied that the primate was the only legitimate government in Poland at the time.) He was a critic of the regime, as well as a mediator between it and the rest of civil society. Wyszyński significantly impeded the communists from taking control of the Church in Poland; he died in 1981 and was replaced by Cardinal Józef Glemp.

When Cardinal Wojtyła of Kraków became Pope John Paul II, his election was greeted in Poland with great enthusiasm. He visited Poland from June 2 to 10, 1979. During his visit, he bluntly challenged communist ideology by declaring that Christianity was the route to true human freedom (as opposed to Marxism) and called on people to show nonconformity. More than thirteen million people took to the streets to greet him, in direct defiance of the Polish government. Dissidents in Poland and elsewhere in Eastern Europe closely followed this event. In his memoir, Radosław Sikorski later wrote: "We realized for the first time that 'we' were more numerous than 'them'."

When visiting the satellite town of Mogiła (where Mogiła Abbey is located) in Kraków, the pope said:

Christ never wants Man to be considered merely as a means of production ... This should be remembered by the worker and the employer, by the work system as well as by the system of remuneration. It must be remembered by the State, the nation and the Church ... For the sake of humanity the Church would like to reach an understanding with every work system, asking only to be permitted to speak to the individual human being about Christ and to love him according to his human dignity ... In the spirit of fraternal solidarity and on the foundation of Christ's cross I, too, have shared in the building of the huge Polish works known as 'Nowa Huta' together with you, managers, engineers, miners, labourers, minister.

Within a year, the independent trade union Solidarity was formed, initially on the basis of economic concerns; soon it became a political movement affiliated with the Church. Jerzy Urban, government spokesman, claimed:

All the people's grievances against the power of the state were channelled into the Church and the election of a Pole as the Pope strengthened this religious propensity even further; when He came to Poland, I knew that this meant the end of a political epoch.

== Solidarity movement and its aftermath (1981–1990) ==
Pope John Paul II promoted Poland's cause internationally, as well as the cause of Christians behind the Iron Curtain, to the great discomfort of the communist governments in the Warsaw Pact. The pope rejected liberation theology, however, and he kept the Church from becoming too directly involved in politics. Nevertheless, the Church in Poland played a key role in the revolution against the regime during the 1980s, and the Church provided symbols (e.g., the Black Madonna and the suffering Christ) that gave spiritual depth to the struggle against communism. For example, John Paul II's portrait with Mary became a popular icon in the struggle. The Church also provided spiritual and material comfort to striking workers and acted as a mediator between the Solidarity movement and the government.

The Church also restrained the striking workers from excesses. The government allowed the broadcast of Cardinal Wyszyński's sermon to the striking workers on radio and television—although the cardinal's condemnation of the propagation of atheism was censored—in which the cardinal called on workers to end the strike. On many occasions, the primate (both Wyszyński and Glemp) and the pope called on Solidarity to be more cooperative and reasonable, and these religious leaders even criticized the trade union for actions taken.

In December 1981, martial law was imposed in Poland. This situation caused significant trouble for the Church, and many people were rounded up by the military. Many in the Church defended those who were arrested. The government nevertheless found that it needed the Church as a mediator during the crisis. Communist leader General Wojciech Jaruzelski, in his first address to the Sejm in 1982, stated:

Cooperation between the state and the Catholic Church and other beliefs belongs to permanent principles. The government, enabling the fulfillment of the pastoral mission of the Catholic Church and other beliefs, preserves in accordance with the constitution, the lay character of the state. The dialogue continues. We are sincerely interested in it. Differences of opinion should not hide the supreme goal, which is for all Poles the strengthening of the sovereign state. We constantly declare readiness for constructive cooperation.

In 1982, the Joint Committee of Episcopate and Church was reactivated; it began negotiations between the state and the Church on the latter's position in Poland. As a result of these negotiations, the state acceded to some Church demands, including the following:

- Improving the status of diocesan seminaries
- Exempting seminarians from military service
- Increasing the circulation of Church newspapers
- Returning the organization Caritas to Church control
- Broadcasting the Sunday Mass
- Allowing the import and distribution of the uncensored L'Osservatore Romano (the daily newspaper of Vatican City)

The pope had significant influence during the developing crisis in Poland; the Soviet press denounced the clergy in Poland during this period. An unsuccessful assassination attempt was made on the pope in 1981 in St Peter's Square in Vatican City.

The Polish Orthodox Church (POC) hierarchy, which had seen its position in society strengthened since 1945, spoke out against the Solidarity movement. The POC refused to send delegates to meetings on human rights issues. Some exceptions occurred, such as Fr Piotr Poplawski, an Orthodox priest openly sympathetic to Solidarity who supposedly killed himself in 1985; several doctors asked to confirm his suicide refused to certify it as the cause of death. A Roman Catholic priest named Jerzy Popiełuszko had been murdered by the police the previous year; and the same doctor who had performed Popiełuszko's autopsy was called in and confirmed Fr Piotr's death as a suicide.

During the government's troubles with Solidarity, many parishes were used to aid the grass-roots opposition to the regime. This occurred alongside increasing attacks on priests by the state; these attacks included brutality against priests (some of whom were murdered), breaking into churches, and desecration and theft of religious objects. Communist authorities blamed nationalist Catholics for fanning strife between Catholic and Orthodox populations.

Under the Gdańsk accords of 1980, the Church was given permission to make radio broadcasts. As the 1980s progressed, the Church became increasingly critical of the regime; in the last years of the decade, the Church played a critical role in the transition to democracy.

== Resistance ==
In Poland, Lech Wałęsa—chairman of the Solidarity movement who later became President of Poland—summed up the contrasting Polish views of the Soviets and of religion (specifically Catholicism) as follows:

If you choose the example of what we Poles have in our pockets and in our shops, then… communism has done very little for us. But if you choose the example of what is in our souls, I answer that communism has done very much for us. In fact our souls contain exactly the opposite of what they wanted. They wanted us not to believe in God, and our churches are full. They wanted us to be materialistic and incapable of sacrifice. They wanted us to be afraid of the tanks, of the guns, and instead we don't fear them at all.

This statement shows that some Polish nationalists linked their struggle against the Soviet Union with a struggle against atheism.

In Hungary, following the Hungarian Revolution of 1956, one of the first actions of the resistance was to liberate imprisoned Cardinal József Mindszenty; a crowd took him to the episcopal palace in the city, and his first free action was to celebrate Mass in honor of the resistance.

In Czechoslovakia, the Prague Spring liberalization in 1968 renewed Catholic resistance to the Soviets, as well as to the Soviet-led Orthodox control of Catholic lands, churches, and institutes. This resistance inspired Ukrainian Greek-Catholics to renew their efforts to achieve official recognition from the Soviets.

== See also ==
- Anti-religious campaign during the Russian Civil War (1917–1921)
- League of Militant Atheists
- Persecution of Christians in Warsaw Pact countries
- Religion in Poland
- Anti-religious campaign of communist Romania
- USSR anti-religious campaign (1921–1928)
- USSR anti-religious campaign (1928–1941)
- USSR anti-religious campaign (1958–1964)
- USSR anti-religious campaign (1970s–1987)
