= National-Radical Movement =

National-Radical Movement Ruch Narodowo-Radykalny
- Abbreviation: RN-R
- Leader: Bolesław Piasecki
- Founder: Bolesław Piasecki
- Founded: 29 June 1935; 91 years ago
- Dissolved: September 1939
- Split from: National Radical Camp
- Preceded by: National Radical Camp
- Newspaper: Falanga; Ruch Młodych; Przełom
- Trade union: National Labor Organization
- Membership: 5,000 (1937 est.)
- Ideology: National-radicalism: Polish nationalism (Note: -Ethnic nationalism -National conservatism -Authoritarian conservatism -Conservative corporatism); Christian nationalism (Note: -National Catholicism); Anti-communism; Antisemitism (Note: -Economic antisemitism); Integralism; Anti-Masonry; Fascism; Corporate Statism
- Political position: Far-right
- Religion: Roman Catholicism
- Colors: Green
- Slogan: Czołem Wielkiej Polsce ("Hail Great Poland")

Party flag

The National-Radical Movement Falanga, commonly known as ONR Falanga, and officially called the National-Radical Movement (Polish: Ruch Narodowo-Radykalny or RN-R), was an illegal political organization formed as a result of a split by Boleslaw Piasecki in the National Radical Camp. Its colloquial name comes from a newspaper called Falanga, which was associated with RN-R. Formed (during the political crisis of National Democracy) as a result of a split in the National Radical Camp. Active mainly at universities, propagating nationalist, anti-Semitic and pro-Catholic slogan. Since 1936 cooperated with the Camp of National Unity. Numbered about 5,000 members. During German occupation, Falanga's activities were continued by Confederation of the Nation.

== Formation ==
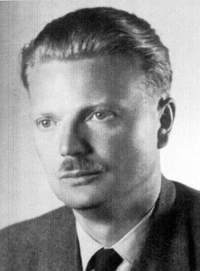
Bolesław Piasecki - leader of the Falanga

Already in 1933, at the Akademik Polski (Polish Academic) an Ideological Committee was established - on the initiative of Bolesław Piasecki - which developed the ideas of the Political Organization of the Nation and a national planned economy. Ideological differences were already evident before the establishment of the ONR, at the beginning of 1934, then they intensified (extremists wanted armed struggle and radicalization of the social program), to explode with full force after Piasecki was released from the camp in Bereza Kartuska. The split finally took place at the beginning of 1935, it was revealed on 25 April, and on 29 June of that year in Kąty the founding congress of the faction, called Falanga or - from the initials of the leader - Bepists took place.

The RNR Falanga was formed in the spring of 1935 following a split by members of the National Radical Camp held in Detention Camp Bereza Kartuska. Adopting the name of Oboz Narodowo-Radykalny (National Radical Camp), it soon became known as Falanga after the title of its journal (the rival group would also soon be named after its own journal, thus becoming known as National Radical Camp ABC).

Falanga was more numerous than its ABC rivals. In 1937, it had 5,000 members. In terms of its social composition, it was, in the words of Bolesław Piasecki himself, "an organization of students and lumpenproletariat." The leading Falanga activists - in addition to Bolesław Piasecki - were Stanisław Cimoszyński, Zygmunt Dziarmaga, Wojciech Kwasieborski, Tadeusz Lipkowski, Adolf J. Reutt, Marian Reutt, Witold Rościszewski, Witold Staniszkis, Olgierd Szpakowski, Bolesław Świderski, Andrzej Świetlicki, Wojciech Wasiutyński. The central theoretical organ of the RNR was Ruch Młodych (1935–1938), and later Przełom (1938–1939), the agitational journal - Falanga. Outside Warsaw, the Falanga gained some influence in Podlasie, Polesie, Silesia, Kielce, Poznań, Kraków, Lwów, Wilno, Gdynia, Łódz, Częstochowa, Zamość, Łuck, Kalisz and Równe. The movement - due to the conspiratorial conditions of its activities - took the form of a network of regional and field organizations, which included: National-Radical Movement (e.g., Białystok and Podhale), National-Radical Youth Movement Camp (Lwów, Wilno, Podlasie), Polish Falanga Front (Łódz), National Breakthrough Front (Poznań), Kuźnica (Silesia), National Labor Organization, Polish Cultural Action Organization.

The militant organization of the RNR was at first the Combat Section, later transformed into the National Combat Organization “Life and Death for the Nation.” Remaining under the command of Wladyslaw Jamontt and Zygmunt Dziarmaga, the NOB numbered 200-300 men and formed the armed elite of the movement.

== Development ==
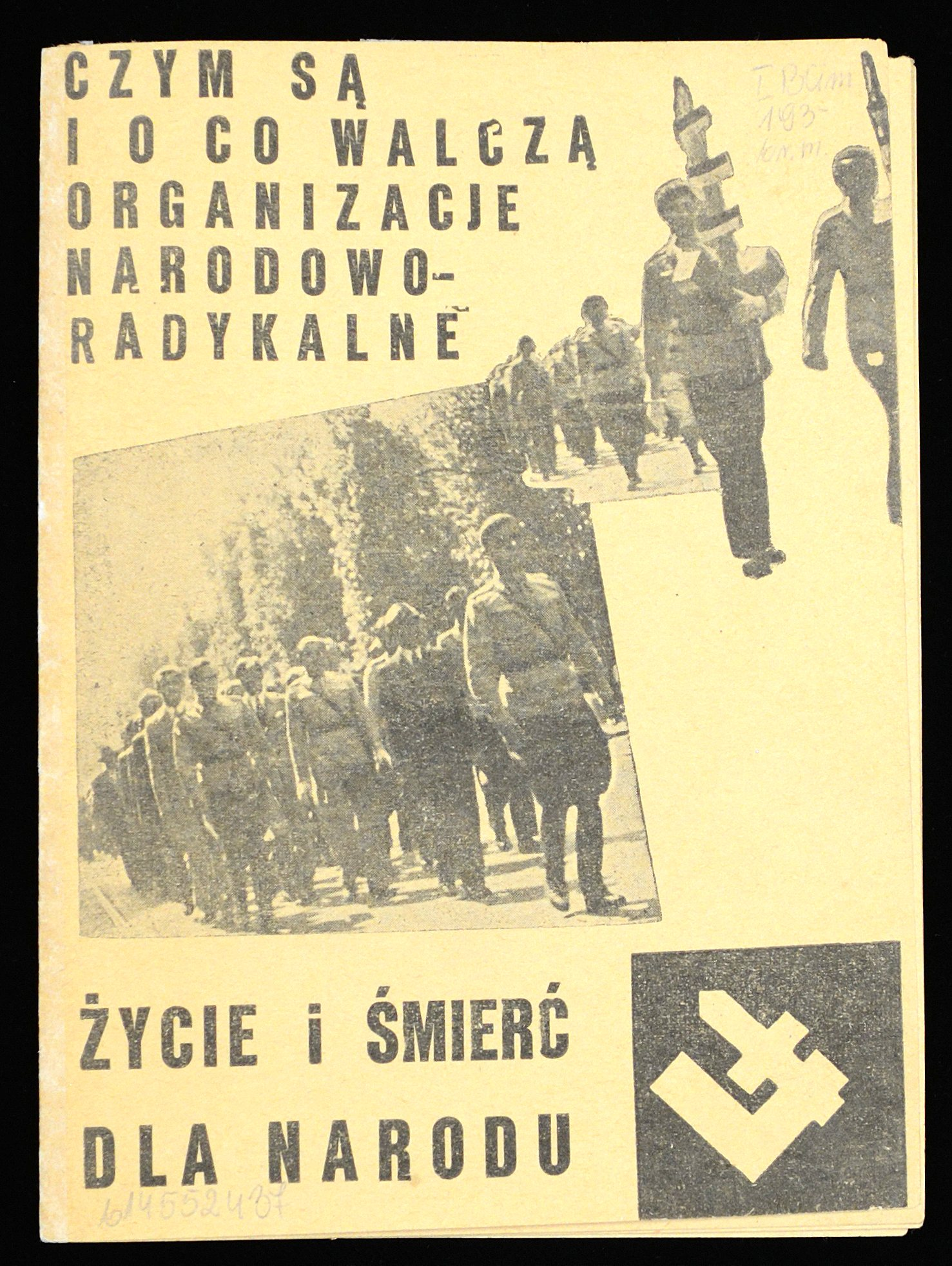
Leaflet of the Falanga. What are national-radical organizations and what do they fight for? Life and death for the nation.

Largely based on university campuses, the Falanga followed a policy of anti-Semitism and although it had few members, from its power bases in schools it attempted to launch attacks on Jewish students and businesses. Left-wing activists were also as part of this violent activity.

The group soon came under scrutiny from the Polish government. Indeed, unlike similar movements in other European countries that regularly held public rallies, the RNR Falanga held only two such gatherings, in 1934 and 1937, both of which were quickly broken up by the police.

For a time, the movement became associated with the Camp of National Unity (Polish: Obóz Zjednoczenia Narodowego, OZN), as Colonel Adam Koc, impressed by the organisation of the RNR Falanga, placed Piasecki in charge of the OZN youth group. Koc called for the creation of a one-party state and hoped to use the youth movement to ensure this, although his pronouncements upset many pro-government moderates. As such, Koc was removed from the leadership of the OZN in 1938 and replaced by General Stanisław Skwarczyński who quickly severed any ties to the RNR Falanga.

== Disappearance ==
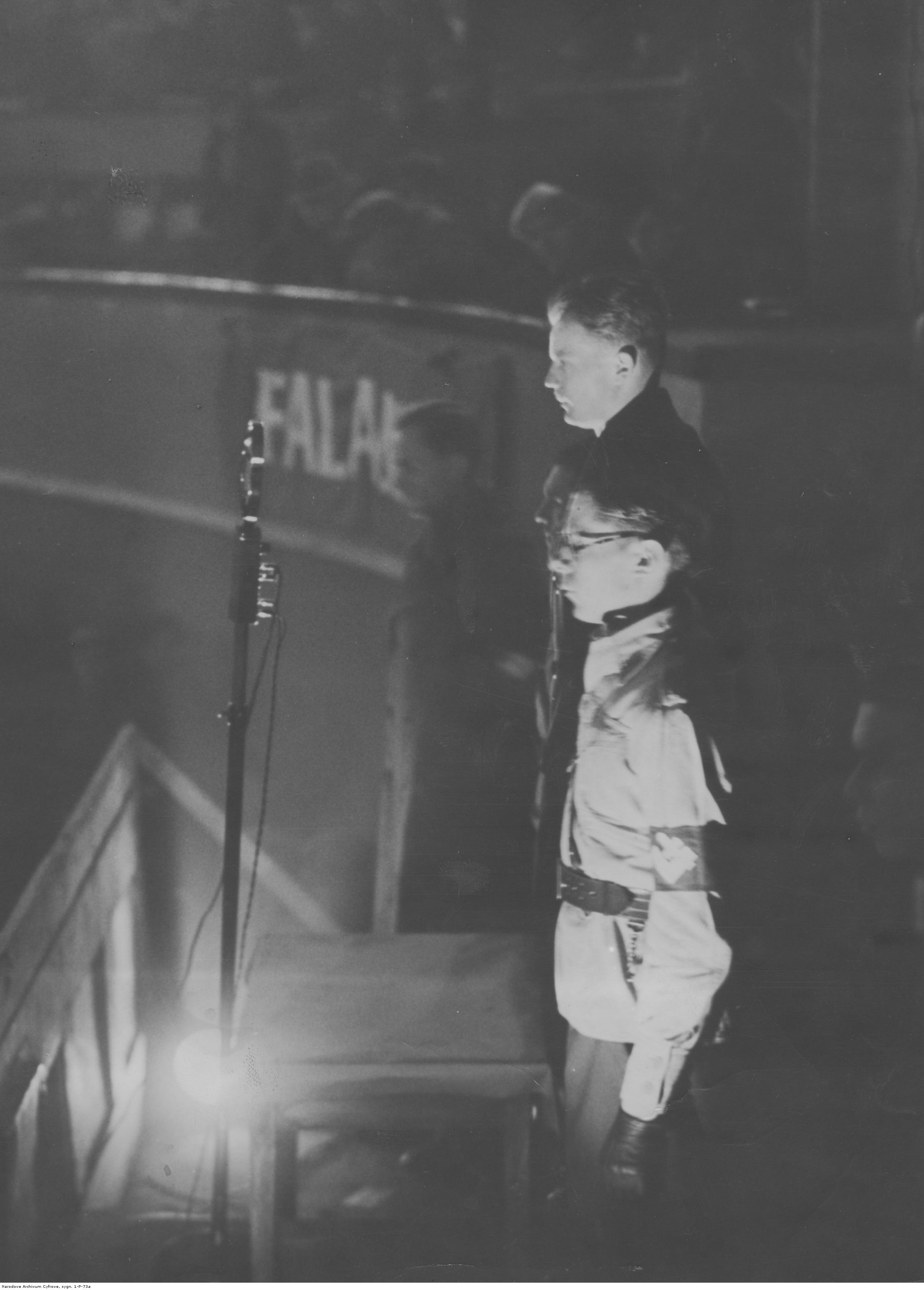
Bolesław Piasecki holding a speech at an RN-R's rally at the Staniewski circus.

The organization weakened from the summer of 1938. There were several reasons. The growing threat from the Third Reich resulted in an increasingly widespread distancing from the Nazi models with which Falanga was associated. A severe blow was the break with the Sanation, while the earlier rapprochement with the regime had compromised the idea of the National Breakthrough in the eyes of many supporters. Finally, Piasecki's egocentrism turned out to be a significant factor. Although this may seem excessive psychologizing, it shows the incompatibility of the idea of leadership with Polish conditions: the soldiers of the Breakthrough rebelled against being reduced to the role of powerless tools. As a result, after the split in OZN, Włodzimierz Pietrzak, Marian Reutt, Kazimierz Hałaburda and Władysław Hackiewicz remained, while Wojciech Wasiutyński, Bolesław Świderski, Witold Staniszkis and Stanisław Cimoszyński founded the dissident journal Wielka Polska in January 1939. The arrogant statement about the boycott of the elections to the Sejm in 1938 masked the weakness of the organization - wherever it ran in the elections, it was defeated (as in the local elections in Łódź, where it won only 333 votes). The disintegration of local organizations was progressing, which was admitted in the Internal Communique of the Department of Ideological Action, writing that the RNR is in an exceptionally difficult position. According to W. Wasiutyński: "When the war broke out, Piasecki's organization practically ceased to exist".

As a Polish nationalist movement the RNR Falanga opposed the German occupation of Poland after the 1939 invasion, and thus was quickly subsumed by the Confederation of the Nation, a group within the Polish resistance that retained certain far right views. The military structure of the Confederation of the Nation was the Striking Cadre Battalions (UBK) – partisan units operating in 1942–1944 (from 1943 as part of the Home Army units).

However, following the establishment of a communist government in 1945, Piasecki was allowed to lead the PAX Association (Polish: Stowarzyszenie PAX), a supposedly Catholic organisation that was in fact a front group of the NKVD which aimed to promote the new communist regime to Poland's Catholics whilst turning them away from the Vatican.

== RN-R Falanga symbols ==
The symbol of the RNR was initially a black sword referring in appearance to the Szczerbiec, but without a ribbon and raised with the blade upward. White armbands with Falanga printed in black were also used as an alternate organizational badge, used by the magazine's distributors - usually members of the RNR. In 1937, a new badge design appeared in the form of a geometrically simplified image of a hand with a sword placed on a green background. This emblem was referred to as a Falanga; it was intended to symbolize modernity and the coming of the national revolution. Logos were also developed for the RNR's satellite organizations; the National Labor Organization, a small trade union of about 5,000 workers, used a symbol modeled on the Falanga of a hand holding a hammer. In turn, the Polish Cultural Action Organization, which brought together representatives of the broader world of culture and art, used a hand with a hammer based on the initials of its name. It is not known whether RNR members, in addition to armbands with the falanga, used other organizational badges - iconographic documents confirm that popular among them were classic swords with a sash without initials. The Falangists also had their own uniforms: at first they wore outfits according to OWP designs, with the difference that they wore green armbands with a white image of a simplified hand with a sword on the left forearm. In time, however, the sand-colored shirts were replaced by green ones to symbolize self-reliance, a radicalization of attitudes and a desire to put into practice the so-called Green Program prepared by Piasecki.

Party emblem of the National-Radical Movement. So-called Falanga.

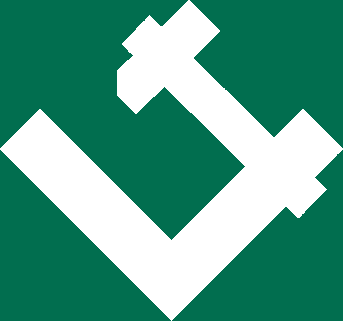
National Labor Organization trade union emblem

Polish Cultural Action Organization emblem

== See also ==
- Confederation of the Nation
- Camp of Great Poland
- National Party
- ONR (disambiguation)
- Camp of National Unity
- National Radical Camp (1993)
- Falanga (organisation)
