= Stanisław Stomma =

Polish publicist, Catholic activist, and politician

- Born: 18 January [O.S. 5 January] 1908; Šacūnai, Kovensky Uyezd, Russian Empire (now Lithuania)
- Died: 21 July 2005 (aged 97); Warsaw, Poland
- Resting place: Forest cemetery in Laski
- Education: Vilnius University
- Occupations: lawyer, publicist, politician
- Title: Member of the Sejm of the Polish People's Republic of the second, third, fourth, fifth and sixth terms (1957–1976), chairman of the Primate's Social Council (1981–1984), senator of the first term (1989–1991)
- Political party: Democratic Right Forum, Democratic Union, Freedom Union
- Spouse: Elwira Szykowska (1947–2005)
- Children: Magdalena, Ludwik
- Parent(s): Ludwik and Jadwiga née Jasieńska
- Awards: Order of the White Eagle, Order of Polonia Restituta, Badge of the 1000th anniversary of the Polish State, Medal for Long Marital Life, Order of Merit of the Federal Republic of Germany

Stanisław Stomma (born 18 January [O.S. 5 January] 1908 – 21 July 2005) was a Polish lawyer, habilitated doctor of law, specialist in criminal law, academic teacher, publicist, Catholic activist, and politician. From 1957 to 1976, he was a member of Sejm of the Polish People's Republic (II, III, IV, V, and VI terms) representing Znak. From 1981 to 1984, he served as the chairman of the Primate's Social Council. From 1989 to 1991, he was a senator in the first term and the senior marshal of the Senate in the first term. He was awarded the Order of the White Eagle.

== Early life ==
He was the son of Ludwik (1859–1910) and Jadwiga née Jasieńska (1875–1944) and had three sisters: Helena (1901–1972), Zofia (1903–1981), and Aniela (1905–1989). He was born into a landowning family, in the family manor of Šacūnai (12 kilometres (7.5 mi) from Kėdainiai and 6 kilometres (3.7 mi) from Šėta) in Lithuania, then under Imperial Russian rule.

== Interwar ==
He attended the Sigismund Augustus Gymnasium in Vilnius (1922–1928) and joined the Sodality of Our Lady and the Union of Polish Youth Przyszłość during his studies. Later, he studied law at Vilnius University. From 1928, he was active in the Vilnius branch of the Association of Catholic Academic Youth Odrodzenie and became its president in the academic year 1929/1930. In 1931, he made his debut as a journalist in the newspaper Słowo.

He defended his master's thesis under the supervision of Stefan Glaser in 1932. After completing his studies, he worked as a non-remunerated judicial trainee, while also working at the rectorate of his alma mater as a student affairs officer. From 1933 to 1936, he was also the secretary of Marian Zdziechowski. At the end of 1936, he briefly joined the editorial board of the magazine Kurier Wileński, and in 1937, he directed the biweekly Pax. In 1937, he defended his doctoral thesis entitled Fault and Causal Connection in the Development of Criminal Law, written under the supervision of Bronisław Wróblewski. From 1937 to 1938, he collaborated with the newspaper Głos Narodu; for six months (until October 1937), he was a member of the editorial board of this newspaper and lived in Kraków at that time.

In his writings in the 1930s, he dealt with Christian thought, national thought, and the issue of totalitarianism, advocating for so-called Christian nationalism, within which social life was to be built on the basis of national community, but with the recognition of the absolute primacy of Catholic ethics. In 1938, he obtained the position of senior volunteer assistant at the Department of Criminal Law at Vilnius University (headed by Bronisław Wróblewski), but immediately (in June 1938) went on a one-year scholarship to Paris.

== World War II ==
In the summer of 1939, he returned to Poland. Following the outbreak of World War II, he was not mobilized due to his health category being "C". In September 1939, he replaced Józef Święcicki as the editor-in-chief of Kurier Wileński, but after the Soviet troops entered Poland, he left for Riga with his friend Antoni Gołubiew. After the Red Army entered Latvia, he returned to Lithuania, where he went into hiding in the countryside. He returned to Vilnius after the German army entered in June 1941. In 1941, he became a member of the editorial board of the underground magazine Dla Polski, published by Father Józef Wojtukiewicz, and also participated in underground education (his students included Henryk Gulbinowicz and Józefa Hennelowa).

=== 1944 ===
In July 1944, he fled from Vilnius due to the approaching Red Army. In August 1944, he found himself in Laski, where he joined the underground resistance, briefly serving in the ranks of the Stowbtsy-Naliboki Group. In October 1944, he moved to Kraków, where he worked for the Main Welfare Council. From December 1944 to May 1945, he was a seminarian at the Higher Theological Seminary of the Archdiocese of Kraków.

== Under Stalinism (1946–1956) ==
After leaving the seminary, he became a close collaborator and then a member of the editorial team of Tygodnik Powszechny; during this time, he advocated for seeking compromise with the communist authorities and taking into account political realities. He also briefly collaborated with the magazine Dziś i Jutro. In the autumn of 1946, together with Hanna Malewska, he became the editor-in-chief of the magazine Znak, but de facto from 1947, Hanna Malewska directed the magazine (Stanisław Stomma remained one of its main columnists). From 1947, he participated in meetings of the Kraków Club of Logophages.

In September 1946, he was a signatory of a memorial by Catholic intellectuals to the Polish Episcopate, appealing for support for the establishment of a political party representing Polish Catholics. In November of the same year, he signed a declaration along with 37 Catholic writers who supported the initiative to create a Catholic political organization. He also participated in an attempt to create, with the consent of the authorities, a Catholic parliamentary representation in connection with the parliamentary elections in 1947 (the initiative, considered belated by the authorities, was ultimately rejected by the Polish Episcopate).

In the autumn of 1946, he published an article titled Maximal and Minimal Social Tendencies of Catholics in the third issue of Znak. In this article, he sought a compromise between Catholicism and socialism, primarily in the sphere of social system reform, arguing that the Catholic Church is not bound to any specific program in this matter. He also emphasized the necessity of building strong spiritual, cultural, and intellectual foundations, providing Catholicism with the opportunity for long-term development. Faced with the aggressive communist policy, he advocated for a retreat to "religious-moral" positions. His proposal met with opposition from a significant part of the Catholic community (debaters included Jan Piwowarczyk, Józef Marian Święcicki, Tadeusz Przeciszewski, Kazimierz Studentowicz, Jerzy Braun), accusing him, among other things, of a stance of capitulation. Stanisław Stomma subsequently defended his position in an article titled On Apparent Maximization and Imagined Defeatism, published in Tygodnik Powszechny on 20 April 1947. He sought a different path for the functioning of Catholic communities under communism than confrontation or ideological surrender.

From 1 January 1946, he was an employee of the Department of Criminal Law at the Jagiellonian University. In 1947, he habilitated based on his work Sociological Assessment of Certain Concepts of Criminal Law Science (formal habilitation approval was only granted by the higher education authority in 1957). He unsuccessfully applied for a position at Nicolaus Copernicus University in Toruń, and in October 1949, he received a notice of termination at Jagiellonian University (he was given a choice: to work at the university or in a Catholic publication), as a result of which he ceased to work at JU on 31 January 1950.

In the issue of Tygodnik Powszechny dated 10 December 1950, together with Jerzy Turowicz, he published an article titled Catholics in People's Poland, in which they declared that while they see many positive aspects in socialism, the socialist ideal is not their ideal, and the separate Catholic position should be respected. In another joint article titled The Polish Experiment, published in Tygodnik Powszechny on 3 February 1952, they positively responded to the State-Church agreement of 14 April 1950, suggesting that the apolitical stance of Catholics entails the necessity of loyalty to the state. Faced with escalating anti-Church policies and censorship interference in May 1952, he, along with Jerzy Turowicz and Jacek Woźniakowski, appealed for the continued publication of Tygodnik Powszechny, declaring the possibility of supporting some aspects of the government's policies (such as economic issues, combating German nationalism and revisionism, alliance with the USSR), but on the condition of maintaining autonomy in non-political matters. During this period, along with other editors of Tygodnik Powszechny, he consulted most strategic decisions with Archbishop Stefan Wyszyński.

After the previous editorial team was removed from Tygodnik Powszechny in June 1953, he was unemployed for about a year. In 1954, he was employed at the National Museum in Kraków, where he worked as the head of the museum library. He also received an advance for a series of essays from the publishing institute Pax. He remained one of the leaders of the former Tygodnik Powszechny editorial team.

== From 1956 to 1961 ==
In October 1956, he was part of a group of lay Catholics who announced the establishment of the Nationwide Club of Progressive Catholic Intelligentsia, aimed at forming a "social representation" of Catholic communities. At that time, he, along with other leaders of this movement, was accepted both by Stefan Wyszyński and by Władysław Gomułka. In Przegląd Kulturalny (issue from October 25–31, 1956), he published an article titled Access to Contemporary Poland, in which he supported the October 1956 reforms aimed at eliminating Stalinist totalitarianism, pointing out that Poland's territorial integrity was guaranteed by the alliance with the USSR. In November 1956, he was re-employed at the Faculty of Law at the Jagiellonian University, although his actual academic work was hindered by his soon-to-be political activities (in the following years, he had only one doctoral student – Andrzej Spotowski, who defended his doctoral thesis in 1970). His application for the title of professor was never considered.

In the following years, he advocated for the program of so-called neo-positivism, within which he sought a compromise with the authorities of the Polish People's Republic that would allow for the free operation of Catholic communities (including the operation of Catholic intelligentsia clubs and parliamentary representation) and would permit concessions by the authorities to the Catholic Church. Therefore, he accepted the alliance with the USSR as geopolitically inevitable and did not question the actual power of the Polish United Workers' Party. He rejected what he called "political romanticism" and "prestige politics" appealing to "grand slogans". However, his goal remained the democratization of the system. He demanded that the Polish government be the expression of the real aspirations of the people and, in the economic sphere, called for breaking away from doctrinairism and for social control over the economy.

In 1957, he ran as an independent candidate in the parliamentary elections (standing in district No. 34 in Kraków), publicly declaring that his goal in the Sejm would be to fight for the rights of believers and defend the interests of the Catholic Church. He also emphasized that Catholic deputies could serve as advisers to Marxists. According to official election results, he received over 249,000 votes, surpassing, among others, Józef Cyrankiewicz. In the Sejm, he became the chairman of Znak parliamentary caucus, as well as the vice-chairman of the Foreign Affairs Committee and a member of the Senior Convention. In his first parliamentary speech, he stressed that despite ideological differences and "unpleasant past experiences", Catholic deputies shared overarching national goals, including the ideal of a sovereign and just Poland. Already at the beginning of 1958, he observed a departure from the policies initiated in October 1956 (although he considered the most important achievements of that period to be preserved), publicly calling for greater trust in society and enabling greater involvement of non-party individuals. Initially, he maintained optimism regarding the intentions of the Polish United Workers' Party, and therefore, despite the worsening situation of the church, on one hand, he encouraged Cardinal Stefan Wyszyński to make another attempt at reaching an agreement with the party authorities, and on the other hand, along with other Znak deputies, he called on the ruling party to refrain from harassing believers and to accept the historical and social role of the Catholic Church.

From 1957, he began establishing contacts with political circles in West Germany, openly formulating the condition of respecting borders.

From September 1958, he was the president of the Klub Inteligencji Katolickiej in Kraków; at the same time, he was involved in the Klub Inteligencji Katolickiej in Warsaw, serving as its vice president from 1958 to 1962. In October 1958, he accompanied Stefan Wyszyński on a trip to Rome in connection with the conclave following the death of Pius XII.

In the fall of 1959, he permanently moved to Warsaw.

== From 1961 to 1976 ==
In the parliamentary elections of 1961, he once again obtained a parliamentary seat in Kraków, receiving, according to official data, 302,000 votes (once again surpassing Józef Cyrankiewicz). He remained the chairman of Znak parliamentary caucus and was a member of the Foreign Affairs Committee and the Judiciary Committee. In his first parliamentary speech, he affirmed the achievements of the Polish People's Republic, accusing lower levels of administration of discriminating against believers; however, he emphasized hope for the growth of democracy in Poland and the socialist bloc. Despite the deteriorating relations between the state and the Catholic Church, he continued to seek possibilities for compromise, unsuccessfully urging Cardinal Stefan Wyszyński to do so. He advocated for a "socially constructive" attitude instead of "hostile neutrality" and stressed the importance of organic work, including the need to develop the spiritual and intellectual formation of youth.

At least from 1961, his residence was bugged by officers of the Security Service. The authorities of the Polish People's Republic considered him a representative of the so-called right-wing faction within the Catholic Intelligentsia Club, with the criterion being the attitude towards the Polish United Workers' Party, indicating that this group viewed socialism as a necessary evil and worked towards its liberalization, expecting a weakening of the party's leading role.

He was fascinated by the Second Vatican Council, but later critically assessed the post-council period, pointing to a strong crisis in the Catholic Church caused, among other things, by materialistic tendencies and consumerism erasing the religious element.

In January 1963, he published a critical article in Tygodnik Powszechny titled With the Dust of Fraternal Blood, dedicated to the January Uprising. In it, he criticized the cult of defeat and irrational heroism. He was publicly criticized for this by Stefan Wyszyński. During this time, his position in church circles gradually weakened. Another crisis in relations with the primate was caused by the circulation in October 1963 in Rome of the "opinion of Catholic circles in Poland" associated with Tygodnik Powszechny, the monthly magazines Znak and Więź, and the Znak parliamentary caucus, prepared with the participation of Stanisław Stomma. This document was considered a mistake for condemning any form of state governed by communists. While observing the continuous worsening of the situation of the Catholic Church in Poland, it was suggested that relations with the authorities did not have to deteriorate. Therefore, a constructive attitude towards social and economic tasks was called for. However, the most controversial point of the document was the demand for the establishment of diplomatic relations between Poland and the Holy See. Stefan Wyszyński regarded this text as an act of disloyalty, and Stanisław Stomma's apology was accepted only in April 1964.

In the 1960s, he became involved in the process of Polish-German reconciliation. In 1969, as the first Polish MP, he was received by the President of Germany, Gustav Heinemann.

He was elected as a member of parliament again in 1965, taking the fourth place in the Kraków constituency No. 4, and remained the chairman of Znak parliamentary caucus. In Sejm, he publicly criticized the lack of progress in the processes of democratization, persecution of the Catholic Church, and excessive censorship interference, emphasizing that national unity cannot be equated with uniformity. His relations with Stefan Wyszyński remained cool, and they were only restored in January 1967. In this parliamentary term, he also encountered growing differences within his parliamentary caucus, especially in relation to Janusz Zabłocki's separate position. Along with other members of the caucus, he submitted a parliamentary interpellation in March 1968 in defense of university students who were victims of "brutal police action", which led to attacks formulated in Sejm. In this context, he subsequently suggested that MPs from Znak resign their mandates and refrain from running for re-election. However, he encouraged caucus members to remain in Sejm, as advised by Stefan Wyszyński.

Eventually, in 1969, he became an MP for the fourth time, taking the first place in the constituency No. 4 in Kraków (according to official results, he received 97% of the votes), once again assuming the position of chairman of the parliamentary group. In this term of Sejm, he served as the Vice Chairman of the Foreign Affairs Committee and a member of the Judiciary Committee. However, his position within Znak parliamentary group weakened. Janusz Zabłocki suggested that Konstanty Łubieński should become the new chairman, and the only supporter of Stanisław Stomma remained Tadeusz Mazowiecki. Nevertheless, he maintained good relations with Cardinal Stefan Wyszyński. His political contacts with the authorities of the Edward Gierek era were also weaker than before (other members of the group, Janusz Zabłocki and Konstanty Łubieński, were in better standing).

He was also elected to Sejm in 1972 (this time in the constituency No. 9 in Białystok, where according to official results, he took second place, receiving over 98% of the votes). Once again, he became the chairman of Znak parliamentary group, although there were plans for a change in leadership within the group. However, the Kraków faction of Znak protested against this, believing that in such a situation, Stanisław Stomma should leave the group. In February 1976, as the only member, he did not support changes to the Constitution of the Polish People's Republic, concerning the leading role of the Polish United Workers' Party and the alliance with the USSR, abstaining from voting. He believed that the changes would entrench the socialist form of power without societal control. As a result, the authorities of the Polish People's Republic did not allow him to run for Sejm in 1976, although he himself considered such a possibility.

== From 1976 to 1989 ==
In 1978, he retired from the Jagiellonian University. In the late 1970s, he maintained a distance from opposition activities but befriended Adam Michnik, whom he regarded as the wisest Polish politician of the time. In 1980, he published the book Is Fatalism of Hostility? Reflections on Polish-German Relations 1871–1933.

During the events of August 1980, he joined a petition addressed to the communist authorities, signed by 64 scientists, writers, and journalists, calling for dialogue with striking workers. After the emergence of Solidarity, he maintained a friendly but cautious stance towards it, being critical of the excessive radicalism in many union actions. In the autumn of 1981, he was a signatory to two open letters addressed to the authorities of the Polish People's Republic, urging them to seek unity and dialogue. While highlighting the government's responsibility for the difficult economic situation, the letters also emphasized the necessity of respecting the alliance with the Soviet Union. However, these documents did not influence the decisions of the authorities. In December 1981, he became the chairman of the newly established Primate's Social Council. He was the main author of the council's fundamental document, announced in April 1982, titled Theses of the Primate's Social Council on Social Accord, in which they called for an agreement between the authorities and society. The condition for the accord was to end repression and allow free activity for trade unions and cultural and social organizations. He led the council's working group on political thought. From 1983 onwards, he critically assessed the methods of its work, advocating for discussions among a smaller but more specialized group of people.

He was opposed to street demonstrations and general strikes, advocating instead for the gradual building of independent social structures. In the autumn of 1983, at the request of the church authorities, he participated in negotiations with the government regarding the fate of the leaders of Solidarity and the Committee for Social Self-Defense KOR awaiting trial. At the end of his term in the Primate's Social Council in December 1984, he became involved in the activities of the informal Dziekania Political Thought Club, of which he became the chairman. From 1986, he was a member of the newly formed senior convocation, defining the program of meetings. However, he rejected the possibility of entering Sejm as part of a new group approved by the Catholic authorities or participating in the Consultative Council with the Chairman of the State Council, although he only made this decision under the influence of the negative opinion of the Warsaw Catholic Intelligentsia Club. In 1988, he took over Dziekania as a legally operating association aimed at creating a platform for cooperation among various independent circles characterized by realism and moderation in political and social aspirations. In December 1988, he joined the Solidarity Citizens' Committee with Lech Wałęsa, the chairman of the Solidarity. In the spring of 1989, he participated on the opposition side in the proceedings of the Polish Round Table Agreement – in plenary sessions and in the work of the political reform group.

== From 1989 until death in 2005 ==
In the 1989 elections, he was elected to the Senate from the Płock Voivodeship. On 4 July 1989, as the senior marshal, he chaired the inaugural session of the first term of the Senate, at that time belonging to the Citizens' Parliamentary Club. In the upper house of parliament, he became a member of the Foreign Affairs Committee. After the elections, he considered the compromise reached at the Round Table as binding. He cast an invalid vote during the vote on Wojciech Jaruzelski's candidacy for the presidency. He also supported the theses of Adam Michnik's article Your President, Our Prime Minister, published a few weeks earlier. In the autumn of 1989, he concluded the activities of the Dziekania Political Thought Club along with other members. He was one of the founders of the Democratic Right Forum, established in June 1990, and was a member of its program council. He was also a member of the parliamentary group of the Democratic Right Forum.

He was among the supporters of Tadeusz Mazowiecki's candidacy for the presidency in 1990. In late 1990, he, along with other Democratic Right Forum politicians, joined the Democratic Union, where he belonged to the Democratic Right Faction. He remained in the Democratic Union even after some members of the faction formed the Conservative Party in the autumn of 1992. He opposed the ideological struggle against the Catholic Church, expressing his views in intra-party discussions. From 1994, he was a member of the Freedom Union, although he opposed the merger of the Democratic Union with the Liberal Democratic Congress. In the following years, however, he did not play a significant role in the party.

He approved of Leszek Balcerowicz's economic reforms, although he called for an active social policy. He opposed lustration and putting Wojciech Jaruzelski on trial before the State Tribunal, defending the essence of the Round Table Agreement. Until the mid-1990s, he participated in bodies related to shaping foreign policy, including meetings of the Atlantic Club and the Euro-Atlantic Association. He was a member of the Polish-Israeli Society and the Council for Polish-Jewish Relations under the President of the Republic of Poland.

He died on 21 July 2005. The funeral ceremonies took place on 27 July 2005, at the Warsaw Archcathedral. He was buried in the Forest Cemetery in Laski.

== Private life ==
In 1947, he married Elwira Szykowska (1924–2006), whom he had met in Vilnius. In 1948, their daughter Magdalena was born, and in 1950, their son Ludwik was born.

== Distinctions and awards ==
- Order of the White Eagle (1994)
- Commander's Cross of the Order of Polonia Restituta (1969)
- Knight's Cross of the Order of Polonia Restituta (1964)
- Grand Cross of the Order of Merit of the Federal Republic of Germany (1988)
- Badge of the 1000th Anniversary of the Polish State (1966)
- Medal for Long Marital Life (1997)
- Włodzimierz Pietrzak Award (1950)
- Honorary Doctorate from the Jagiellonian University (2000)

== Bibliography ==
- Friszke, Andrzej (1997). Oaza na Kopernika. Klub Inteligencji Katolickiej 1956–1989 (in Polish). Warsaw: Biblioteka "Więzi". ISBN 83-85124-90-X.
- Friszke, Andrzej (2002). Koło posłów "Znak" w Sejmie PRL 1957–1976 (in Polish). Warsaw: Wydawnictwo Sejmowe. ISBN 83-7059-527-8.
- Ptaszyński, Radosław (2018). Stommizm. Biografia polityczna Stanisława Stommy (in Polish). Kraków: Społeczny Instytut Wydawniczy "Znak". ISBN 978-83-240-5360-5.
- "Stanisław Stomma" (PDF). senat.pl (in Polish).
- "Stanisław Stomma (1908–2005) – sylwetka i publikacje". kul.pl (in Polish).
