= Ryszard Reiff =

Polish politician and resistance member

- Born: 4 July 1923; Warsaw, Warsaw Voivodeship, Second Polish Republic
- Died: 9 December 2007 (aged 84); Warsaw, Masovian Voivodeship, Third Polish Republic
- Resting place: Evangelical Augsburg Cemetery
- Education: University of Warsaw
- Organization: PAX Association
- Political party: Democratic Union
- Other political affiliations: Confederation of the Nation
- WWII
- Allegiance: KN
- Branch: UBK
- Service years: 1939–1944

Ryszard Reiff (4 July 1923, Warsaw – 9 December 2007) was a Polish politician, lawyer, publicist and resistance fighter. He was a deputy to the Polish parliament (Sejm) during the 1968 political crisis and again during martial law.

== Biography ==
Born in Warsaw in 1923, Reiff studied law at the University of Warsaw. After the German invasion of Poland, he took part in the resistance movement. He was a member of the far-right Confederation of the Nation (KN) underground organization and commanded one of the first units of its Striking Cadre Battalions (UBK). Later, he became a member of the Home Army (AK) when the KN merged with it, and fought against German forces near Navahrudak. As a member of AK, he was arrested by the Soviet NKVD, and imprisoned for two years (1944-1946).

After his release in 1946, he started work as a publicist, becoming involved with the pro-communist and pro-Catholic faction in the Polish United Workers' Party (PZPR). First, he worked in the Dziś i Jutro newspaper, and from 1950 to 1953 he was a chief editor of the Słowo Powszechne daily and publishing arm of the secular government-sponsored PAX Association, during the years of Stalinism. In 1976, he became PAX deputy director, and in 1979, its full director. He adopted a position supportive of Solidarity, an independent Polish trade union. A Catholic intellectual, he was a committed critic of Polish government policies, and he once urged a coalition to be formed of leaders from Solidarity, the PZPR, and the Catholic Church, advocating "the establishment of a corporatist arrangement between major political actors as the only way to stabilize Poland's political situation and resolve the deepening economic crisis." From 1965 to 1969 and from 1980 to 1985 he was a deputy to the Sejm.

On the night of 12-13 December 1981, martial law was proclaimed in Poland. In an effort to try to make the implementation of martial law appear legal, the Polish military ordered the Council of State, a collective presidency, to approve it by a formal vote. Reiff was the only member of the Council of State to vote against the measure, and he lost his position in the council the following year. In January 1982, he was removed from his leadership of PAX by several members of the organization. Some observers were reported to have concluded that this was because those members wanted to change the direction of PAX towards a pro-government stance similar to what it held in the 1950s, though one source contends that the removal was engineered by the leadership of the Polish government in an effort to re-assert its control over the group. From 1980 to 1985, he was once again a Sejm deputy.

With the coming fall of communism in Poland, from 1989 to 1991 he was a member of the Solidarity Citizens' Committee, and joined the Democratic Union party.

He was a chairman of the Association of Sybiraks (Polish exiles to Siberia). Between 1939 and 1941, and 1944 and 1953, around 1.8 million Poles were deported to the Russian region of Siberia, resulting in 500 000 deaths. Ostensibly, the deportations occurred to those who had resisted the Soviet takeover of eastern Poland in 1939, assisted the Nazis during the Second World War, and who were members of the Polish Home Army—an anti-Communist resistance group during the war. A number of human rights groups in Poland protesting against the deportations that occurred, formed the Siberian Union in 1988 with Reiff as its leader.

He died on 9 December 2007 in Warsaw.
