= Sylwia Frołow =

Polish writer, journalist, editor, and proofreader (born 1965)

- Born: 1965 (age 60–61)
- Citizenship: Polish
- Occupations: Writer, journalist, editor, proofreader

Sylwia Frołow (born 1965) is a journalist, editor and proofreader at Tygodnik Powszechny and writer. For several years she was the secretary of Jerzy Pomianowski.

== Books ==
=== Non-fiction ===
- Dzierżyński. Miłość i rewolucja. Kraków: Znak. 2014. ISBN 9788324028719.
- Bolszewicy i apostołowie. Wołowiec: Czarne. 2014. ISBN 9788375368659.
- Antonówki. Kobiety i Czechow. Wołowiec: Czarne. 2020. ISBN 9788381910224.
- Nasz biedny Fiedia. Kobiety i Dostojewski. Wołowiec: Czarne. 2021. ISBN 9788381913232.
- Zagadka Gogol. Marginesy. 2026. ISBN 9788368549928.

=== Novels ===
- Spojrzenia. Warszawa: Rosner i Wspólnicy. 2009. ISBN 9788360336342.
- I dusza, i seks. Rozpisani.pl. 2013.
