= Company of Propagation of Secular Culture =

Company of Propagation of Secular Culture (Polish: Towarzystwo Krzewienia Kultury Świeckiej) is an association created in 1969 from the merger of the Association of Atheists and Freethinkers and the Association of Secular Schools (both founded in 1957), aimed at promoting and strengthening the secular culture. Close cooperated, among others, with the Central Personnel Center of Excellence inept.

== Tasks ==
- "Strengthening the unity of patriotic believers and non-believers";
- "Promoting socialist customs and rituals associated with life: personal, professional, social, in order to give them a secular form";
- "Dissemination of Marxist philosophy and religion";
- "Promoting the principles of socialist morality";
- "Collaboration in shaping the personality of secular young people";
- "The development of beliefs and attitudes of modern man - free from myths and religious illusions, actively fighting for the victory of the ideals of socialist humanism";
- "Deepening cratic, secular principles of social coexistence: the privacy practices of religion, separation of church and secular institutions, freedom of conscience and religion and tolerance";
- "To promote socialist style and quality of life."

== See also ==
- Polish anti-religious campaign

== Bibliography ==
- J. Rusiecki "Od A do Z. O związkach zawodowych i organizacjach społecznych w Polsce", Warszawa 1974.
- F. Adamski "Ateizm w kulturze polskiej Zeszyty Naukowe UJ." Prace pedagogiczne, 1993, zeszyt 18.
- M. Agnosiewicz "Kultura świecka na rozdrożu" – artykuł z portalu racjonalista.pl
- M. Horoszewicz "Pierwsze lata" – artykuł z portalu kulturaswiecka.pl
