= Bolesław Piasecki =

Polish politician and writer (1915–1979)

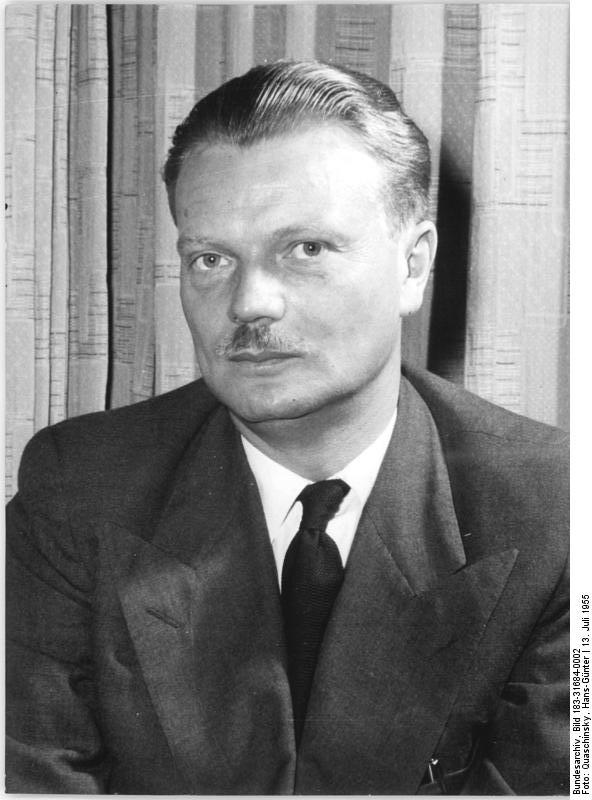
- Piasecki, c. 1955

Leader of the National-Radical Movement
- In office 1935–1939

Leader of PAX Association
- In office 1947–1979
- Succeeded by: Ryszard Reiff

Personal details
- Born: Bolesław Bogdan Piasecki; 18 February 1915 Łódź, Congress Poland, Russian Empire
- Died: 1 January 1979 (aged 63) Warsaw, Poland
- Education: University of Warsaw
- Occupation: Politician; ideologue; writer; soldier; entrepreneur
- Nickname(s): Leon Całka, Wojciech z Królewca, Sablewski

Military service
- Branch/service: Polish Army; Striking Cadre Battalions; Home Army
- Years of service: 1939–1944
- Rank: Lieutenant
- Unit: Warsaw Armoured Motorized Brigade; CO of the Striking Cadre Battalions; Home Army's 77th Infantry Regiment
- Battles/wars: World War II; September Campaign; Operation Tempest; Operation Ostra Brama

Bolesław Bogdan Piasecki, alias Leon Całka, Wojciech z Królewca, Sablewski (18 February 1915 – 1 January 1979) was a Polish writer, politician and political theorist. During the war, he was active in the anti-German and anti-Soviet armed underground. Initially of national radical views, he became associated after the war with the ruling Polish communists and led a group of lay Catholics who collaborated with the communist regime.

In the Second Polish Republic he was one of the more prominent Polish nationalist politicians, playing an important role in the leadership of National Radical Camp. In 1934 he was interned in Bereza Kartuska Prison. After his release, he became the leader of the illegal, extreme right faction National-Radical Movement "Falanga". This organisation advocated "Catholic totalitarianism" and is considered by many to have been a fascist movement with ideological influences from anti-Semitism, Spanish Falangism, and Italian Fascism. Nevertheless Piasecki refused to cooperate with the occupation of Poland after the Nazi invasion of 1939.

During the Second World War he was a member of the Polish resistance, leading the grouping Confederation of the Nation (merged into the Armia Krajowa in 1943) and taking part in the fighting around Vilnius. He was imprisoned by the Gestapo in 1939, and after his release fought with the Home Army in the Warsaw Uprising. Afterwards, he was arrested by the Soviet NKVD and imprisoned in Lublin Castle. After being interrogated by Marshal Ivan Serov, in a drastic conversion from his previous stance began to cooperate with the Communist Polish People's Republic.

After the war, in 1945, he co-founded and directed a so-called social progressive movement of lay Catholics, grouped around the weekly publication Dziś i Jutro. The magazine attacked the Polish People's Party opposition and endorsed the government in the 1946 Polish people's referendum campaign. In 1947 he created the PAX Association and was the chairman of its governing body until his death. Piasecki described the newspaper's primary aim as "the reconstruction of a Catholic doctrine with respect to the ongoing conflict between Marxism and capitalism." The organization also managed the Polish branch of the Catholic charity Caritas Internationalis after it was nationalized by the government.

In 1955 several important members of Pax, including Janusz Zabłocki and future Prime Minister Tadeusz Mazowiecki, revolted and quit their posts at the party and newspapers. Afterwards, the importance of PAX diminished (and Piasecki's role along with it). Piasecki had also never been accepted by the mainstream Catholic Church in Poland, with Cardinal Stefan Wyszyński prohibiting the clergy from subscribing to Piasecki's newspapers. In 1957 Piasecki's teenage son Bohdan was abducted, possibly by agents of the Polish Ministry of Public Security. Nonetheless Pax remained a prominent organisation until 1989 and its successors still exist today.

In later years, Piasecki was a member of the Polish Sejm from 1965, where he presided over the grouping of members associated with PAX. In 1971-1979 he was a member of the Polish Council of State.

== Biography ==
=== Interwar period ===
==== Early life ====
The parents of Piasecki were Ludomir Piasecki and Pelagia Piasecka nee Kotnowska, both from a minor noble background. Piasecki was born in Łódź, but when he was two years old, his parents moved to Warsaw, where his father took a position as the manager of estates and forests of the Prison Department. There, Piasecki attended the prestigious Jan Zamoyski Gymnasium. Both at home and at school, national traditions prevailed, but initially, Piasecki did not show an active interest in politics. This changed dramatically in 1929 when, at the age of 14, Piasecki joined the National Gymnasium Organization (NOG), also known as "Noga", lit. 'a leg'). According to his associates, as a reason for his sudden interest in politics he reportedly replied at the time, "I realized that I will be ruling Poland."

The NOG was a clandestine youth organization of the National Party operating in high schools where political activity was prohibited. Soon Piasecki became the administrator of Życie Szkoły a magazine edited and published by students, there he published theoretical texts in which he for the first time expressed the basis of his later political activity and beliefs: anti-individualism, the role of social activity, mono-ethnicity.

==== Beginnings of political activity ====
In 1931, Piasecki enrolled in the Faculty of Law at Warsaw University. As a student, he joined the Academic Branch of the Camp of Great Poland (OWP). The OWP was intended as an organization founded by National Democracy activists to bring together all right-wing parties against the rule of Sanation. However, it was quickly dominated by radical activists originating from the OWP Youth Movement (Ruch Młodych OWP). The Academic Branch was the Warsaw University-only counterpart of the All-Polish Youth, which was the main student organization of the nationalist movement. He quickly became one of the leading activists of the Academic Branch, and was ahead of others in the radicalism of his views. In 1932, a brochure published by the Academic Branch of the PLO appeared: Guidelines on issues: Jewish, Slavic minorities, German, principles of economic policy. The pamphlet was anonymous, but Piasecki was most likely one of the authors. The brochure advocated depriving Jews of most of their civil rights, giving them the status of " belongers," as well as the universalization of property, and limiting the influence of big capital.

Piasecki also became a member of the elite National Guard, which was secretive internally within the nationalist camp. It was active in all leadership bodies of the SN and OWP. It was divided into three grades: White Eagle, Zet and the highest Home Fire, headed by Roman Dmowski. Piasecki had been a member of the White Eagle since 1932 and Zet since 1934. The National Guard existed to sustain activity in the event of the outlawing of the openly operating OWP and SN. In mid-1932 this actually happened in the two strongest voivodeships, Poznań and Pomeranian. In 1933, the OWP protested against the planned abolition of university autonomy. The strike, co-organized by Piasecki, collapsed and was a pretext for the complete outlawing of the OWP which happened in March 1933.

These events influenced Piasecki, who decided to form his own radical organization in the belief that the struggle between Endecja and Sanation would lead to radicals taking power in both camps. He was given an opportunity to do so by becoming editor-in-chief of Akademik Polski in 1933, around which he began to gather like-minded activists. In the articles he published, he concretized his own theory of a future totalitarian Polish state. In his mind, power was to belong to the best, judged by their intellectual level, quality of character and degree of social commitment. Only Poles could be the citizens, but he also recognized Belarusians and Ukrainians as Poles, but excluded Germans, Jews and others from this group. The state was to be governed by the Political Organization of the Nation, its members elected the Superior for a 5-year term and the legislature (a collegial body). The Superior appointed the government. The system also provided for a referendum among the Organization's members. The education of children would be handled by the Political and Educational Organization of the Nation, mainly concerned with the selection of the best, as well as the Polonization of Slavic minorities. Piasecki also developed the theory of the "ideological attack," a sudden ideological transformation of Polish society, achieved through the activities of the nationalist youth. His main political adversary in Academic Polski editorial staff was Wojciech Wasiutyński.

At the beginning of 1934, Piasecki became head of the Youth Section of the National Party, and later co-founded the National-Radical Camp (ONR). After the assassination of Interior Minister Bronisław Pieracki by Ukrainian nationalists, 600 ONR activists ended up in the Bereza Kartuska camp. Among them was Bolesław Piasecki.

==== Falanga ====
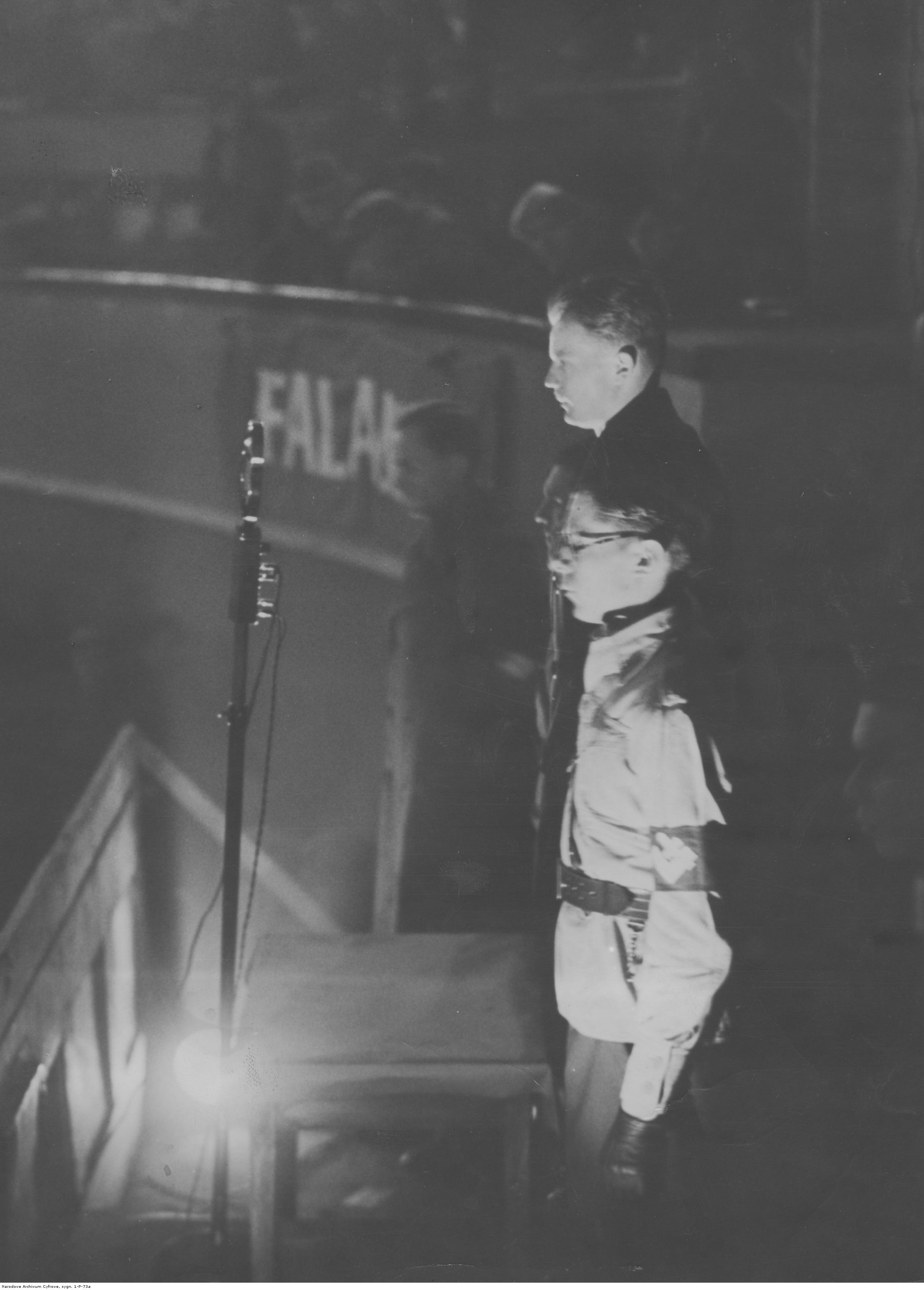
Speech by RNR Falanga leader Bolesław Piasecki, 28 November 1937

At this point, a split occurred in the ONR. Piasecki's group (called bepists after his initials) first gathered around the Akademik Polski. After it was banned, it began publishing a new magazine, Ruch Młodych (Youth Movement), and in July 1936, the magazine Falanga. From the name of the latter the name RN-R "Falanga" adhered to the group. Piasecki sought to expand the group's influence and, in 1936, established the Youth Press Committee, which was tasked with the cooperation of all right-wing, anti-communist magazines.

In 1937, Piasecki established cooperation with the ruling Sanation, primarily with the Camp of National Unity led by Adam Koc. On 22 June 1937, the OZN youth organization, the Union of Young Poland, was established. Formally at its head was Adam Koc, but in fact its leadership was exercised by Jerzy Rutkowski, on 28 October 1937 Rutkowski formally became the head of the ZMP. Rutkowski was an associate of the RNR Falanga. Officially, Koc denied any connection with Falanga and Piasecki, but de facto ZMP soon came under Piasecki's influence. Koc himself was deeply fascinated by the young, then 22-year-old nationalist. At the same time Piasecki formed the terrorist National Fighting Organization "Life and Death for the Nation". Piasecki's militia carried out anti-Semitic attacks, attacked left-wing organizations, and fought against a rival part of the ONR, the ONR ABC.

It was the highest point in Piasecki's pre-war career. However, it ended rather quickly. The OZN's cooperation with the RNR discredited Koc, who was removed from his post, and on 22 April 1938 new chief of OZN Stanisław Skwarczyński severed any cooperation between the OZN and the ONR. Contributing to Koc's downfall were rumors that, at the behest of Gen. Edward Rydz-Śmigły, he was preparing, in cooperation with Piasecki, an assassination attempt on Śmigły's political opponents in the Sanation camp.

Several attempts to re-establish cooperation with the Sanation were unsuccessful, and Piasecki's organization was losing ground, with more collaborators leaving him. In July 1939 he was forced to close Falanga magazine due to lack of funds.

=== Second World War ===
==== Confederation of the Nation ====
In September 1939, he took part in the defense of Poland against the German invasion as a soldier in the Warsaw Armored Motorized Brigade. The brigade fought until 20 September, when, faced with the impossibility of further fighting, its commander Colonel Stefan Rowecki ordered the destruction of equipment. Piasecki decided to return to Warsaw, where he arrived in early October. Piasecki's steps after returning to Warsaw are not clear. According to some accounts, he was supposed to cooperate with the NOR organization (the acronym in Polish stands for either the National Revolutionary Camp or the National Radical Organization), which attempted to collaborate with the Germans. Given Piasecki's strong anti-Germanism, this is unlikely. It seems more likely that he collaborated with the National People's Military Organization or attempted to form his own organization: National Fight Organization.

The beginnings of conspiratorial activity were interrupted by the arrival of Stanisław Brochowicz, who, released from prison, sought revenge on the people who had led to his imprisonment. Brochowicz collaborated with the Gestapo and denounced a number of ONR members, including Piasecki, who were arrested on 13 December 1939. Piasecki was released on 16 April 1940 thanks to the intercession of Luciana Frassati Gawronska, who maybe even intervened with Mussolini. After his release from prison, he descended into the underground. On 24 May, a German special court sentenced him to death.

During this period, Piasecki became close to the conspiratorial nationalist organization Pobudka (lit. 'Awakening') led by pre-war ONR-Falanga activist Witold Rothenburg-Rościszewski. There Piasecki became close to a group led by Jerzy Hagmajer. Pobudka was one of the organizations that refused to subordinate themselves to the Union of Armed Struggle (ZWZ), which at that time was considered to be sanationist organisation. In April 1940, these organizations formed the Committee of Agreement of Independence Organizations, and in September 1940 the more compact Confederation of the Nation (KN). At that time, he also began editing the KN newspaper Nowa Polska (lit. 'New Poland'), around which he began gathering his supporters and also published the ideological manifesto "The Grand Ideology of the Polish Nation". The political goals and objectives expressed therein became the basis of the organizations led by Piasecki. In "The Grand Ideology," Piasecki outlined a vision of a Poland ruled by a morally high and law-abiding elite that would lead the nation to its historical goal, that is, the creation of a Slavic Empire, in which Poland is to be a guiding force. In Piasecki's thought, compared to the pre-war period, there is a shift away from totalitarian ideals to "universalism," while maintaining an aversion to democracy. Piasecki's program remained strongly anti-communist, anti-Semitic, anti-German, anti-Russian, anti-liberal, and elitist, but anti-Ukrainian aspects appeared.

At the beginning of 1941, the Confederation of the Nation was split into two branches: the political, which remained with the name Confederation of the Nation, and the military, which took the name Armed Confederation. Piasecki took over the leadership of the former, while Jan Włodarkiewicz took over the latter. The Armed Confederation merged with the Union of Armed Struggle during 1941. The KN, meanwhile, continued to take a position that was hostile to the Polish government in exile and its representatives in the country, while respecting their legality, causing other affiliated organizations to leave. As a result, by the spring of 1942, only Piasecki's supporters remained in the KN, and he became its undisputed leader as the Main Commander. His deputy was, with the title of Head of the Home Organization or Head of the New Poland Movement, Jan Moszyński, and, after his arrest, Jerzy Hagmajer. Piasecki directly controlled the strike (combat) section.

==== The Strike ====
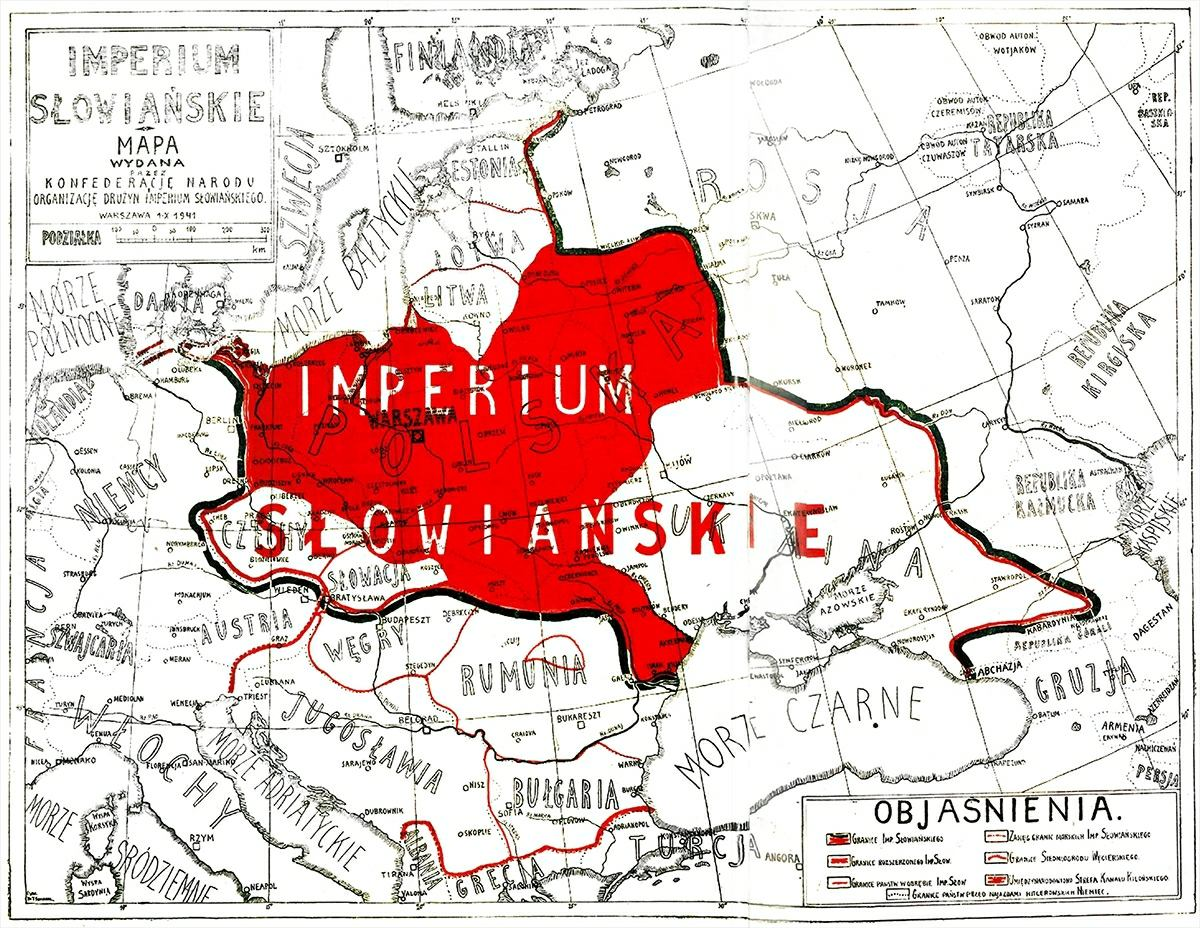
The vision of a Slavic Empire created during the Second World War by the Confederation of the Nation, led by Bolesław Piasecki

From this point on, Piasecki focused on carrying out the ambitious plan of the Strike (Polish: Uderzenie), that is, to take military action that would eventually lead to the realization of the idea of a Slavic Empire. In Piasecki's mind, the German-Soviet struggle will not end in victory for either side, and into the resulting vacuum will step the troops he is creating, whose bold strike will impress the masses who will follow in their footsteps. To this end, he undertook the organization of partisan units that were to set out for the eastern territories of Poland and take up arms there against the Germans and the Soviet partisans. Piasecki's group was small in number, but supported but one of the most important cultural periodicals of the Polish Underground Sztuka i Naród (lit. 'Art and Nation') which gave their cause significant symbolical halo.

The march of the 1st Striking Cadre Battalion (UBK) began on 18 and 19 October 1942, with the fighters heading for the Sterdyń forests in the Sokołów Podlaski area. This first expedition ended in failure, the unit was broken up by the Germans, 4 members were killed, 30 were taken prisoner, some returned to Warsaw. The defeat of the expedition caused dissatisfaction in the AK Headquarters, with General Stefan Rowecki demanding that the UBK be disbanded and the soldiers conscripted into the AK. Piasecki was not strong enough to refuse, but dragged out the talks. However, he did not stop the implementation of the Strike. He sent a patrol beyond the Bug River in January 1943, under the command of Ryszard Reiff "Jacek", which turned into a detachment of the 8th Striking Cadre Battalion. In May, the 1st, 4th, and 6th UBKs went into the field, heading towards the village of Dalekie, near Wyszków. On 28 May Piasecki joined the units. However, clumsy synchronisation resulted in the troops being surrounded by the Germans, who managed to break through near Trzcianka. The grouping of 160-200 men was divided into three parts. One of them was almost completely broken up, the others reached the vicinity of Knyszyn. There the grouping was divided into 5 detachments, commanded by: Ryszard Reiff, Stanisław Karołkiewicz "Szczęsny", Julian Jagodziński, Zbigniew Łakiński "Grodniak" and Zbigniew Czarnocki "Czarny". Bolesław Piasecki was in the unit commanded by Ryszard Reiff.

After the arrest of Stefan Rowecki, Bolesław Piasecki returned to Warsaw. There, he quickly concluded merger talks with the Home Army and, on the basis of General Tadeusz Komorowski's order of 17 August 1943, the units of Confederation of the Nation officially became part of the Home Army. They were to undertake activities in the Nowogródek District of the AK. He then decided to return to the unit, handing over the leadership of the KN temporarily to Jerzy Hagmajer. Piasecki then rejoined the unit and reached the Nowogródek District of the Home Army in October. There, the UBK was named the 3rd Battalion of the 77th Infantry Regiment of the Home Army. His direct superior was Józef Świda "Lech," and the district commander was Janusz Prawdzic-Szlaski. There were about 5500 soldiers in the district. On 9 December, the UBK was attacked by Germans in Burnosy. Piasecki was wounded and went to Warsaw for recuperation. There he helped organize another UBK unit under the command of Ryszard Reiff. In February 1944 he was again in the unit. In March, the district commander Świda faced a field court for contacts with the Germans. Piasecki, as a lawyer, was on the jury. A death sentence was issued, which was suspended but Świda was forced to leave the district area, he was replaced by Maciej Kalenkiewicz "Kotwicz". In March, Piasecki's unit, then numbering between 480 and 700 men, became part of the Group East, commanded by Stanislaw Dedelis "Pal," and undertook a series of combat actions: six against Soviet partisans and thirteen against Germans.

Piasecki did not abandon his plans to create a Slavic Empire. To this end, he attempted to pull the Litauische Sonderverbände (also called Lithuanian Territorial Defense Force), formed by the Germans and commanded by Povilas Plechavičius, over to his side. To this end, he sent patrols to the territory of pre-war Lithuania, and also entered into talks with the AK district command on his plans. These attempts, however, led to nothing.

In May, in preparation for the Operation Tempest and Operation Ostra Brama, the Nowogródek District of the AK was subordinated to the Wilno District, with Aleksander Krzyżanowski "Wilk" as commander of both.

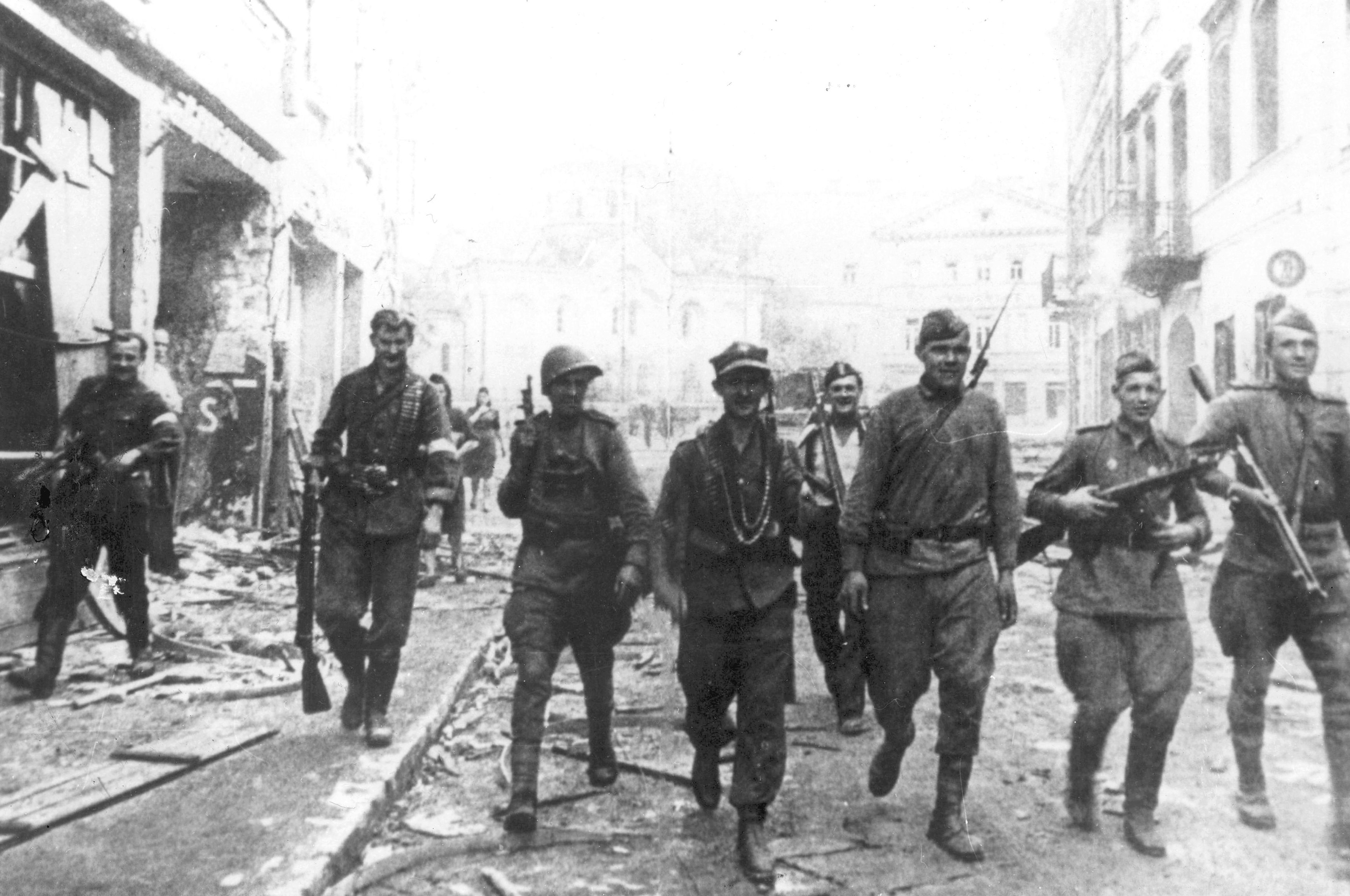
Battle of Vilnius. Soviet Red Army and Polish Armia Krajowa soldiers

==== Ostra Brama ====
The aim of Operation Ostra Brama was to take advantage of the Soviet offensive and seize Vilnius during the retreat of the German army before the Soviet army arrived in the city, so that the Polish army would welcome the Soviet army as a host. Piasecki's unit was part of the eastern grouping of the Home Army, commanded by Major Antoni Olechnowicz "Pohorecki".

The grouping concentrated on 4 July in the area of the Sajliuki village and was to attack the city from the east towards Subocz Street (today Subačiaus gatvė). Piasecki's unit numbered 711 soldiers, entered the battle at midnight from 6 to 7 July 1944, met resistance in the area of the village of Guriai, where it fought a long battle to capture a fortified German point. This battle was successful, however, further advance collapsed. The Home Army resumed fighting alongside Soviet troops, and the Soviet occupation of Vilnius began on 13 July. The UBK (3rd Battalion, 77th AK Infantry) suffered losses of up to 40%.

Piasecki was due to go after the fighting to a meeting of Polish and Soviet officers in Bagušiai on 16 July, at which Polish officers were arrested. However, Piasecki, not trusting the Soviets, departed in the direction of Puszcza Rudnicka, now Rūdninkai Forest, where he encountered other AK units that avoided the Soviet trap. Piasecki and Lieutenant Colonel Janusz Prawdzic-Szlaski decided to march towards Warsaw. Piasecki arrived there in mid-August, when the uprising was already underway. He did not decide to break through to the city. Piasecki's wife Halina Piasecka, née Kopeć, and his brother Zdzisław were killed in the uprising.

As a result of the betrayal of UBK soldier Ryszard Romanowski "Babinicz", Bolesław Piasecki was arrested on the night of 11–12 November 1944 in Józefów.

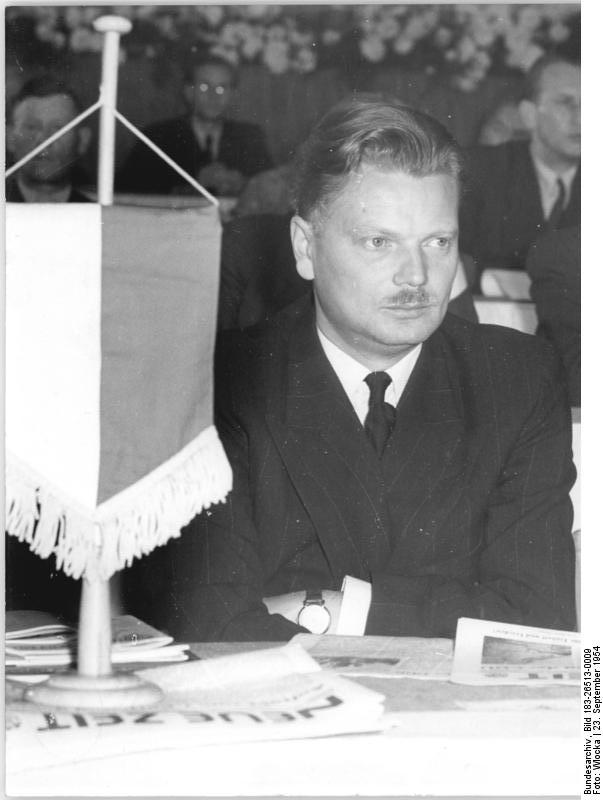
Bolesław Piasecki at a Christian Democratic Union party convention, 1950s.

=== Communist Poland ===
After the war, in 1945, he co-founded and directed a so-called social progressive movement of lay Catholics, grouped around the weekly publication Dziś i Jutro (Polish: Today and Tomorrow). The magazine attacked the Polish People's Party opposition and endorsed the government in the 1946 Polish people's referendum campaign. In 1947 he created the PAX Association and was the chairman of its governing body (until his death). Piasecki described the newspaper's primary aim as "the reconstruction of a Catholic doctrine with respect to the ongoing conflict between Marxism and capitalism." The organization also managed the Polish branch of the Catholic charity Caritas Internationalis after it was nationalized by the government.

In 1955 several important members of Pax, including Janusz Zabłocki and future Prime Minister Tadeusz Mazowiecki, revolted and quit their posts at the party and newspapers. Afterwards, the importance of PAX diminished (and Piasecki's role along with it). Piasecki had also never been accepted by the mainstream Catholic Church in Poland, with Cardinal Stefan Wyszyński prohibiting the clergy from subscribing to Piasecki's newspapers. In 1957 Piasecki's teenage son Bohdan was abducted and later found murdered, possibly by agents of the Polish Ministry of Public Security. Nonetheless Pax remained a prominent organisation until 1989 and its successors still exist today.

In later years, Piasecki was a member of the Polish Sejm from 1965, where he presided over the grouping of members associated with PAX. In 1971-1979 he was a member of the Polish Council of State.

== Selected publications ==
- Wielka Ideologia Narodu Polskiego (lit. 'The Grand Ideology of the Polish Nation'), Warsaw June–July 1940. (clandestine)

== Honours and awards ==
- Silver Cross of the Virtuti Militari (1944)
- Commander's Cross with Star of the Order of Polonia Restituta (1964), previously awarded the Commander's Cross (1955)
- Order of the Banner of Labour, 1st Class (1969)
