= Striking Cadre Battalions =

- Uderzeniowe Bataliony Kadrowe (UBK)
- Active: 1942-1944
- Disbanded: 1944
- Country: German-occupied Poland
- Allegiance: Confederation of the Nation and Home Army
- Role: Armed forces of Confederation of the Nation and part of the Home Army
- Nickname: Uderzenie (lit. ''strike'')
- Engagements: Raid on Mittenheide; Operation Tempest; Operation Ostra Brama

Commanders
- Commandant: Bolesław Piasecki
- Notable commanders: Ryszard Reiff

The Striking Cadre Battalions (Polish: Uderzeniowe Bataliony Kadrowe, UBK) were armed anti-Nazi and anti-Soviet resistance units organized by the right-wing Polish resistance organization Confederation of the Nation. They existed between late 1942 and early 1944 (after August 1943 they were part of the Home Army).

== Beginnings ==
The idea to create the UBK was conceived among Warsaw's conspirational circles in early 1940s. Altogether, eight battalions were formed, and their task was to engage the Germans in Polish countryside, especially in the Eastern Borderlands of Poland.

First attempt to organize armed resistance took place in October 1942. Members of the 1st Battalion, under Captain Ignacy Telechun (nom de guerre Toporski), after concentration in the forests north of Warsaw, headed towards northern Podlaskie, where they wanted to set a base. However, their forces were not strong enough and after several skirmishes with the Wehrmacht, the unit returned to Warsaw. They lost 36 men - 4 killed, 2 wounded and 30 captured.

== Campaigns ==
=== 1943 ===
==== January ====
During winter of 1942/43, the UBK carried out preparations for future actions. In January 1943, a patrol under Ryszard Reiff (Jacek) set towards Ciechanowiec, where the 1st Striking Partisan Platoon was created. After some time, the Platoon was renamed into the 8th Battalion.

==== May ====
In late May 1943, UBK, with permission from the Home Army's headquarters, concentrated its forces (200 men) around Wyszków. The Germans soon found out about it and surrounded the Poles. A skirmish ensued, in which 4 Poles were killed and 8 wounded. German losses were estimated at 15 killed and 22 wounded. Those who were not caught, divided themselves into two groups and headed north, to Bialystok District. On June 11, 1943, the UBK forces under Major Stanisław Pieciul (Radecki) of the 4th Battalion engaged the Germans near the village of Pawły (Bielsk County). 25 Poles and approximately 40 Germans died.

==== July ====
In July 1943, the UBK units, active in Bialystok District, consisted of five battalions. Altogether, there were 200 fighters, and during a number of skirmishes with the Germans (including the Raid on Mittenheide), 138 of them were killed. These heavy losses were criticized by the Home Army's headquarters, who claimed that the UBK was profusely using lives of young Polish soldiers.

==== August ====
On August 17, 1943, upon the order of General Tadeusz Bór-Komorowski, the UBK was included into the Home Army. Soon afterwards, all battalions were transferred to the area of Novogrudok.

=== 1944 ===
During process of reorganization of the Home Army's Novogrudok District, the UBK units created a battalion, which became part of the Home Army's 77th Infantry Regiment, under Bolesław Piasecki. In February 1944, the battalion had around 700 soldiers (some sources put the number at around 500). The unit took part in the Operation Tempest, fighting the Germans around Lida and Vilnius (see: Operation Ostra Brama), where it suffered heavy losses.

== Dissolution ==
On July 17, 1944, the NKVD officers invited the Polish Home Army's Vilnius Command for negotiations, arresting them immediately. After this, the former UBK dissolved, and those soldiers who came from Central Poland decided to get back to their homeland.

== See also ==
- Military history of Poland during World War II
