= Janusz Zabłocki =

Polish politician

Janusz Zbigniew Zabłocki (18 February 1926 – 13 March 2014) was a Polish politician, journalist, Catholic activist, lawyer, soldier of Armia Krajowa.

Janusz Zabłocki

== Life ==
He was born in Grodzisk Mazowiecki. He studied law at the Jagiellonian University, from 1945 to 1949, and political science from 1946 to 1948.

He was a member of

- PAX Association (1950–1955)
- Club of Catholic Intelligentsia (1957–1976)
- Polish Club of Catholic Intelligentsia (1976–1981; as a chairman 1977–1981)
- Polish Catholic Social Union (since 1981; as a chairman 1981–1984)
- Labor Party (1989)
- Znak (1977–1981)
- advisory council (Rada Konsultacyjna) of Przewodniczący Rady Państwa (1969–1989).

He was a member of the Sejm (1965–1985), co-founder of Ośrodek Dokumentacji i Studiów Społecznych (1967), co-founder of Christian-Democratic Party 'Unity' (in 1990), co-founder and editor of Więź, Chrześcijanin w Świecie and Ład.

== Works ==
- Prymas Stefan Wyszyński. Opór i zwycięstwo 1948–1956 (2002; ISBN 83-7311-495-5).
