= Club of Catholic Intelligentsia =

Klub Inteligencji Katolickiej (KIK; English: Club of Catholic Intelligentsia) is a Polish organization grouping Catholic intellectuals. KIK is organized into a series of local chapters (clubs).

KIK was founded after Gomułka's Thaw in communist Poland in 1956, evolving into a mild Catholic-center opposition group in communist Poland. Its purpose was to stimulate independent thought and bring Catholics within Poland information about Catholic philosophy from countries outside the Socialist Bloc. Initially, only four clubs were authorized by the government: Kraków, Poznań, Warsaw, and Wrocław. They distributed information to Catholics throughout Poland via publications in Tygodnik Powszechny (The Universal Weekly) and the monthly Znak (The Sign).

In the early 1980s, the Krakow branch began working with the Solidarity movement and created a network smaller clubs throughout the country. Between 1981 and 1983, when martial law in Poland was imposed, the KIK participated in underground activities to support Solidarity activists. Their overriding goals in the 1980s were to try to improve church-state relationships, end government censorship and promote economic reforms. They urged the government to adopt a stance of being neutral toward Catholics instead of anti-religious. To that end, by the mid-1980s, leaders in the KIK began meeting with government officials. In 1989, the KIK founded a Civic Committee (Komitet Obywatelski) which worked to select the leadership of independent Poland.

The branches of the club continue to hold lectures and meetings on philosophical, religious, and social matters and disseminate information on Vatican II and the teachings of Pope John Paul II.
