= PAX Association =

Organization in the People's Republic of Poland

- Stowarzyszenie PAX
- Abbreviation: PAX
- Formation: 1947
- Dissolved: 1993
- Headquarters: Warsaw
- President: Bolesław Piasecki (1952-1979); Ryszard Reiff (1979-1982); Zenon Komender (1982-1989)
- Publication: Słowo Powszechne: dziennik Stowarzyszenia PAX

The PAX Association (Polish: Stowarzyszenie PAX) was a pro-Communist Catholic organization created in 1947, in the People's Republic of Poland, at the onset of the Stalinist period. The association published the Słowo Powszechne daily for almost fifty years between 1947 and 1993 with an average of 312 issues annually. They were also responsible for the Kierunki (English: Directions) magazine, which was published from the 1950s to 1980s.

The first editor-in-chief of Słowo Powszechne (circulation: 40,000) was Wojciech Kętrzyński (d. 1983) from KN, grandson of historian Wojciech Kętrzyński. In 1982, the newspaper adjusted its name to Słowo Powszechne: dziennik Stowarzyszenia PAX (the "PAX Association Daily"). The publication closed only when the PAX ceased to function in 1993, following the collapse of communism.

In 1953, the PAX notably gave its support to the Stalinist show trial of the Kraków Curia pronouncing death penalties for the Catholic priests accused of treason, and took over the publication of the Catholic weekly magazine Tygodnik Powszechny until the Polish October of 1956.

== Communist era ==
Following the Soviet takeover, the PAX Association had been formed with the intention to undermine grass-roots support for the Roman Catholic Church in Stalinist Poland. Created by Bolesław Piasecki, it approved the trial and imprisonment of many Polish clergymen, among them Bishop Czesław Kaczmarek and Cardinal Stefan Wyszyński. PAX attempted to compete with the conservative clergy of the interwar era over public policy issues, especially after the arrest of hundreds of priests by the state security in early 1950s. The government gave it total control over the Polish branch of the Caritas relief organisation. According to Norman Davies PAX was an NKVD front organisation, set up to win over Polish Catholics to communism, and to break their links to the Vatican. It maintained a presence in the Sejm, winning, for example, five seats in the 1969 election.

== Reforms ==
After 1956, together with many other similar government initiatives, it was toned down and took a more compromising position, in some regards even supporting the leniency for the anti-communist resistance in Poland, even though it firmly endorsed the communist government of the People's Republic of Poland until the fall of communism. After 1982 it was a member of the Patriotic Movement for National Rebirth. Throughout the decades after its creation and the death of Stalin, it continued to steadily lose power and influence, although it still exists in modern Poland.

== Notable members ==
- Bolesław Piasecki
- Janusz Zabłocki
- Jan Dobraczyński
- Tadeusz Mazowiecki

== See also ==
- Carlist Party
- Christian communism
- Christian socialism
- Mladorossy
- National Democracy (Poland)
- Patriotic Movement for National Rebirth
