= Confederation of the Nation =

Polish resistance organization during World War II

The Confederation of the Nation (Polish: Konfederacja Narodu, KN) was one of the Polish resistance organizations in occupied Poland during World War II. The KN was created in 1940 by the far-right National Radical Movement political party from several smaller underground organizations, including the Secret Polish Army. In the political realm it was opposed to more mainstream resistance organizations (such as the Service for Poland's Victory and the Union of Armed Struggle (ZWZ)). It would never attract major support and would remain marginal, eventually partially merging with ZWZ around 1941 and finally joining the Home Army around fall 1943.

The armed branch of the KN were the Striking Cadre Battalions.
