= Dziś i Jutro =

Weekly Catholic magazine (1945–1956)

- Categories: Catholic illustrated magazine
- Frequency: Weekly
- Founder: Bolesław Piasecki
- Founded: 1945
- First issue: 25 November 1945
- Final issue: May 1956
- Country: Poland
- Based in: Warsaw
- Language: Polish

Dziś i Jutro (Polish pronunciation: [ˈd͡ʑiɕ ˈi ˈju.trɔ], Polish: Today and Tomorrow) was a Catholic weekly illustrated magazine which was published between 1945 and 1956 in Warsaw, Poland. It was one of the publications supported by the ruling Communist Party.

== History and profile ==
Dziś i Jutro was founded in 1945 by a group led by Bolesław Piasecki, and its first issue appeared on 25 November that year. The group was the members of a philo-Stalinist movement and was known with the title of the magazine until 1952. The goal of the magazine was to secure the acceptance of the revolutionary socialist changes by the Catholics in the country and to produce a synthesis between Catholicism and Marxism. From 1947 the publisher of Dziś i Jutro was a company owned by its founding group.

Its subtitle was A Catholic Social Weekly, but its use by the magazine was banned by the Catholic Church in Poland. The magazine came out weekly and was headquartered in Warsaw. The Catholic Church did not give permission its members to subscribe to it or publish articles in it. The magazine was included in the list of prohibited publications of the Supreme Sacred Congregation of the Holy Office in 1955. As of 1955–1956 the magazine sold around 5,000 copies.

Dziś i Jutro ceased publication in May 1956 and was succeeded by another weekly Catholic magazine Kierunki.
