= List of Jagiellonian University people =

The following list predominantly names notable alumni of the Jagiellonian University (its faculty and other prominent figures affiliated with the university are mostly not featured on this list).

== History ==
Founded in 1364 by King of Poland Casimir the Great, the Jagiellonian University (Polish: Uniwersytet Jagielloński) is considered among the oldest universities in continuous operation in the world as well as one of Poland's two most prestigious academic institutions alongside the University of Warsaw. Alumni and faculty of the university include many internationally acclaimed philosophers, composers, politicians, poets, writers, historians, natural and social scientists.

Among the most distinguished alumni of the university are: Renaissance polymath Nicolaus Copernicus, theologian and Saint John Cantius, chronicler Jan Długosz, poet Jan Kochanowski, King of Poland John III Sobieski, Enlightenment-era thinker Hugo Kołłątaj, inventor and pioneer of oil industry Ignacy Łukasiewicz, chemist Jan Olszewski, social anthropologist Bronisław Malinowski, mathematician Wacław Sierpiński, playwright Stanisław Wyspiański, Nobel Prize winners Ivo Andrić and Wisława Szymborska, chemist Leo Sternbach, psychiatrist Antoni Kępiński, science fiction writer Stanisław Lem, composer and conductor Krzysztof Penderecki, Pope John Paul II, 6th President of Poland Andrzej Duda, historian Norman Davies, physicist Artur Ekert and neuroscientist Jerzy Vetulani.

== List of notable alumni ==
- John Cantius (1390–1473), scholastic, theologian
- Jan Długosz (1415–1480), historian and chronicler
- Stanisław Kazimierczyk, also known as Saint Stanislaus of Kazimierz (1433–1489), Polish Catholic priest, saint and theologian
- Michał Falkener (ca. 1450–1534), Silesian Scholastic philosopher, astronomer, astrologer, mathematician, theologian and philologist
- Albert Brudzewski (1445–c.1497), astronomer, mathematician, philosopher and diplomat
- Yuriy Drohobych (1450–1494), Ruthenian philosopher, astronomer, writer and medical doctor
- Laurentius Corvinus (1465–1527), humanist; lecturer at the university
- Nicolaus Copernicus (1473–1543), astronomer; promoter of heliocentrism
- Maciej Miechowita (1457–1523), Renaissance scholar, historian, chronicler, geographer, medical doctor, alchemist and astrologer
- Francysk Skaryna (1485?–1540?), pioneer of the Belarusian language; first to print a book in an Eastern Slavic language (1517 in Prague)
- Johannes Honter (1498–1549), Transylvanian Saxon, renaissance humanist, Protestant reformer, and theologian
- Andrzej Frycz Modrzewski (1503?–1572), diplomat; political thinker; religious thinker
- Mikołaj Rej (1505–1569), Renaissance poet, writer, translator and theologian
- Marcin Kromer (1512–1589), historian; Prince-Bishop of Warmia
- Ivan Fyodorov (c. 1525–1583), Russian printer regarded as one of the fathers of Eastern Slavonic printing
- Jan Kochanowski (1530–1584), Polish Renaissance poet
- Wawrzyniec Goślicki (ca. 1530–1607) Polish nobleman, Bishop of Poznań, political thinker and philosopher best known for his book De optimo senatore (1568)
- Cyprian Bazylik (1535–1600), composer; musician; poet
- Wojciech Oczko (1537–1599), philosopher, doctor, Royal Secretary to King Sigismund II Augustus
- Bartosz Paprocki (c. 1543 – 1614), writer; historiographer; translator; poet; genealogist
- Jan Brożek (1585 –1652), mathematician, astronomer, physician, poet, writer, musician
- Stanisław Koniecpolski (1590?–1646), military commander; military politician; Grand Hetman of the Crown
- Kasper Twardowski (ca. 1592–ca. 1641), poet of the early Polish Baroque period
- John III Sobieski (1629–1696), military leader; monarch of Polish–Lithuanian Commonwealth; victor of the Battle of Vienna
- Stanisław Dąmbski (ca. 1638–1700), Bishop of Krakow
- Kasper Niesiecki (1682–1744), heraldist, lexicographer and theologian
- Hugo Kołłątaj (1750–1812), a constitutional reformer and educationalist, one of the most prominent figures of the Polish Enlightenment
- Wincenty Pol (1807–1872), poet; geographer
- Ignacy Łukasiewicz (1822–1882), pharmacist and a pioneer of oil industry; deviser of the first method of distilling kerosene from seep oil and builder of the world's first modern oil refinery
- Edmund Matejko (1829–1907), insurgent, teacher, and older brother of the painter Jan Matejko
- Carl Menger (1840–1921), Austrian economist; lawyer; founder of the Austrian School of economics
- Henryk Jordan (1842–1907), philanthropist, physician and pioneer of physical education
- Edward Janczewski (1846–1918), biologist
- Karol Olszewski (1846–1915), physicist; chemist; the first to liquefy oxygen, nitrogen and carbon dioxide from the atmosphere
- Feliks Koneczny (1862–1949), historian, theatrical critic, librarian, journalist and social philosopher
- Józef Paczoski (1864–1942), botanist
- Aleksander Meysztowicz (1864–1943), politician, landowner
- Kazimierz Przerwa-Tetmajer (1865–1940), Polish Goral poet, novelist, playwright, journalist and writer, a prominent member of the Young Poland movement
- Ignacy Daszyński (1866–1936), socialist politician and journalist
- Stanisław Wyspiański (1869–1907), playwright, painter and poet, as well as interior and furniture designer
- Stanisław Estreicher (1869–1939), historian of law and bibliographer
- Tadeusz Estreicher (1871–1952), chemist, historian and cryogenics pioneer
- Vasyl Stefanyk (1871–1936), Ukrainian modernist writer and political activist
- Bohdan Lepky (1872–1941), Ukrainian writer and poet
- Tadeusz Boy-Żeleński (1874–1941), writer, poet, critic and translator
- Marian Dąbrowski (1878–1958), journalist, entrepreneur and publisher, the biggest and the most influential press magnate of the Second Polish Republic
- Maria Grzegorzewska (1888–1967), educator, propagator of the special education movement
- Wacław Sierpiński (1882–1969), mathematician
- Władysław Ślebodziński (1884–1972), mathematician
- Bronisław Malinowski (1884–1942), anthropologist
- Stanisław Kot (1885–1975), Polish historian and politician
- Sofija Kymantaitė-Čiurlionienė (1886–1958), Lithuanian writer, educator, and activist.
- Stefan Kopeć (1888–1941), biologist and pioneer of insect endocrinology
- Kazimierz Papée (1889–1979), Polish Ambassador to the Holy See 1939–1958
- Tomasz Dąbal (1890–1937), lawyer, activist and politician
- Bronisław Hager (1890–1969), physician, public health pioneer, and political activist
- Stanisław Janikowski (1891–1965), diplomat and an Etruscologist
- Oskar Halecki (1891–1973), historian, social and Catholic activist
- Ivo Andrić (1892–1975), Yugoslav novelist and poet, Nobel Prize laureate
- Kazimiera Iłłakowiczówna (1892–1983), poet, prose writer, playwright and translator
- Adam Obrubański (1892–1940), reporter, manager of the Polish National Team, murdered by the Soviets in the Katyn Massacre
- Wacław Jędrzejewicz (1893–1993), Polish Army officer, diplomat, politician and historian
- Adam Heydel (1893–1941), economist and representative of the Cracow School of Economics
- Henryk Sławik (1894–1944), diplomat recognised as Righteous Among the Nations for the rescue of Jews in World War II Hungary
- Arkady Fiedler (1894–1985), writer, journalist and adventurer best known as the author of Squadron 303
- Stanisław Sosabowski (1892–1967), Polish general in World War II
- Leopold Infeld (1898–1968), physicist
- Józef Feldman (1899–1946), historian
- Volodymyr Kubiyovych (1900–1985), Ukrainian geographer, cartographer, encyclopedist, politician, and statesman
- Adam Vetulani (1901–1976), historian of medieval and canon law
- Yaroslav Halan (1902–1949), Ukrainian anti-fascist playwright and publicist
- Kazimierz Kordylewski (1903–1981), astronomer
- Józef Pieter (1904–1989), psychologist, philosopher, pedagogue, researcher, and lecturer
- Oskar R. Lange (1904–1965), economist and diplomat
- Ludwik Gross (1904–1999), Polish-American virologist
- Wanda Wasilewska (1905–1964), novelist and journalist and a left-wing political activist
- Iwo Lominski (1905–1968), bacteriologist
- Edward Rydz-Śmigły (1886–1941), politician, statesman, Marshal of Poland and Commander-in-Chief of Poland's armed forces, as well as a painter and poet
- Kazimierz Lejman (1907–1985), dermatologist and college department head
- Tadeusz Pankiewicz (1908–1993), pharmacist and a Righteous Among the Nations
- Lelord Kordel (1908–2001) Polish-American nutritionist and author of books on healthy living
- Adolf Fierla (1908–1967), writer and poet
- Maria Irena Mileska (1908 –1988), Polish educator, war resister, scoutmaster and doctor of geography
- Janina Oszast (1908–1986), Polish biologist and resistance movement member
- Andrzej Dunajewski (1908–1944), zoologist and ornithologist
- Leo Sternbach (1908–2005), chemist; inventor of the benzodiazepine
- Tadeusz Pankiewicz (1908–1993), pharmacist; Righteous Among the Nations who aided Jews in the Kraków Ghetto
- Danuta Gierulanka (1909–1995), mathematics educator, psychologist, philosopher, and translator
- Józef Cyrankiewicz (1911–1989), Communist politician; Prime Minister of Poland 1947–1952, 1954–1970
- Jerzy Turowicz (1912–1999), journalist
- Poldek Pfefferberg (1913–2001), business owner who inspired Schindler's Ark, and its film adaptation, Schindler's List
- Artur Jurand FRSE (1914–2000), geneticist
- Herbert Czaja (1914–1997), German Christian democratic politician
- George Zarnecki (1915–2008), art historian specializing in English Romanesque art
- Sigmund Strochlitz (1916–2006), American activist and Holocaust survivor
- Wilhelm Mach (1916–1965), writer, essayist, poet and literary critic.
- Jerzy Tabeau (1918-2002), cardiologist one of the few escapees from Auschwitz concentration camp
- Antoni Kępiński (1918–1972), psychiatrist
- Mietek Pemper (1920–2011), law student, Holocaust survivor who compiled Schindler's list
- Karol Wojtyła (1920–2005), later John Paul II, Pope of the Catholic Church
- Tadeusz Różewicz (1921–2014), poet, playwright, writer, and translator
- Zbigniew Czajkowski (born 1921), fencer ("Father of the Polish School of Fencing")
- Andrzej Łobaczewski (1921–2007), psychologist who studied totalitarianism and introduced the concept of political ponerology
- Stanisław Lem (1921–2006), science-fiction writer
- Piotr Słonimski (1922–2009), Polish-born French geneticist, pioneer of yeast mitochondrial genetics
- Wisława Szymborska (1923–2012), poet, 1996 Nobel laureate in Literature
- Anna-Teresa Tymieniecka (1923–2014), philosopher, phenomenologist, founder and president of the World Phenomenology Institute
- Zofia Szmydt (1923–2010), mathematician
- Zygmunt Szweykowski (1929–2023), musicologist
- Edmund Niziurski (1925–2013), writer of children's literature
- Józefa Hennelowa (1925–2020), publicist, journalist, columnist and politician
- Stanisław Łojasiewicz (1926–2002), mathematician
- Yoram Gross (1926–2015), Australian animation producer
- Andrzej Wróblewski (1927–1957), figurative painter
- Franciszka Szymakowska (1927–2007), geologist
- Krystyna Zachwatowicz (born 1930), scenographer, costume designer and actress
- Czeslaw Olech (1931–2015), mathematician
- Krzysztof Penderecki (1933–2020), composer and conductor
- Andrzej Trzaskowski (1933–1998), jazz composer and musicologist
- Jerzy Vetulani (1936–2017), neuroscientist, pharmacologist and biochemist
- Norman Davies (born 1939), British historian
- Krzysztof Zanussi (born 1939), film and theatre director, producer and screenwriter
- Wojciech Dziembowski (born 1940 in Warsaw), astronomer, member of Polish Academy of Sciences and Polish Academy of Learning
- Maria Olech (born 1941), Antarctic researcher; namesake of the Olech Hills in the Three Sisters point area of Antarctica
- Andrzej Zoll (born 1942), lawyer, former judge and president of the Polish Constitutional Tribunal, former Polish Ombudsman and former president of the State Electoral Commission
- Maria Dzielska (1942–2018), classical philologist, historian, translator, biographer of Hypatia, and political activist
- Adam Zagajewski (1945–2021), poet, translator, essayist
- Tomasz Gizbert-Studnicki (born 1948), jurist and professor of legal sciences specializing in legal theory
- Lidia Morawska (born 1952), physicist
- Jerzy Pilch (1952–2020), writer, columnist, and journalist
- Stanisław Pyjas (1953–1977), anti-communist activist
- Róża Thun (born 1954), politician
- Bat-Erdeniin Batbayar (born c. 1954), Mongolian politician, political analyst and writer
- Zbigniew Preisner (born 1955), film score composer
- Wojciech Inglot (1955–2013), chemist; founder of Inglot Cosmetics
- Marta Kwiatkowska (born 1957), theoretical computer scientist
- Jan Rokita (born 1959), liberal politician
- Artur Dmochowski (born 1959), journalist, historian, and diplomat
- Bogdan Klich (born 1960), politician, former Minister of National Defence of Poland
- Artur Ekert (born 1961), physicist, one of the inventors of quantum cryptography
- Sławomir Kołodziej (born 1961), mathematician
- Jarosław Gowin (b. 1961), politician and editor, former Minister of Justice and Minister of Science and Higher Education
- Krzysztof Warlikowski (born 1962), theatre director
- Beata Szydło (born 1963), politician, former Prime Minister of Poland
- Wojciech Smarzowski (born 1963), film director and screenwriter
- Robert Makłowicz (born 1963), journalist, historian, television personality and food critic
- Manuela Gretkowska (born 1964), writer, feminist and politician
- Elżbieta Bieńkowska (born 1964), politician, former Deputy Prime Minister and Minister of Regional Development and Transport and European Commissioner
- Grzegorz Hajdarowicz (born 1965), entrepreneur, film producer and publisher
- Jan Hartman (born 1967), philosopher
- Joanna Rajkowska (born 1968), contemporary artist
- Paulo Szot (born 1969), Brazilian opera singer; winner of Tony Award for best actor on Broadway 2008
- Waldemar Żurek (born 1970), Polish judge, politician and Minister of Justice of Poland.
- Sławomir Dębski (born 1971), historian
- Andrzej Duda (born 1972), lawyer, politician, 6th President of Poland
- Agata Kornhauser-Duda (born 1972), former teacher and the current First Lady of Poland
- Jacek Dukaj (born 1974), science fiction and fantasy writer
- Jadwiga Emilewicz (born 1974), politician and political scientist, Deputy Prime Minister of Poland
- Sabina Jakubowska (born 1974), novelist and midwife
- Czeslaw Walek (born 1975), Czech lawyer and LGBT activist, studied law at the university 1993–99
- Paweł Kowal (born 1975), politician and former Member of the European Parliament
- Maciej Stuhr (born 1975), actor and comedian
- Urszula Chowaniec (born 1976), literary scholar and critic
- Zośka Papużanka (born 1978), writer and songwriter
- Władysław Kosiniak-Kamysz (born 1981), politician and physician
- Adam Bielecki (born 1983), alpine and high-altitude climber
- Alicja Bachleda-Curuś (born 1983), actress and singer
- Jakub Żulczyk (born 1983), writer and journalist
- Jarosław Duda, computer scientist

== See also ==
- List of universities in Poland
- Education in Poland
