= Vicarage of the Church of the Assumption of the Blessed Virgin Mary =

Vicar of St. Mary's Church
- Wikarówka Kościoła Wniebowzięcia Najświętszej Marii Panny
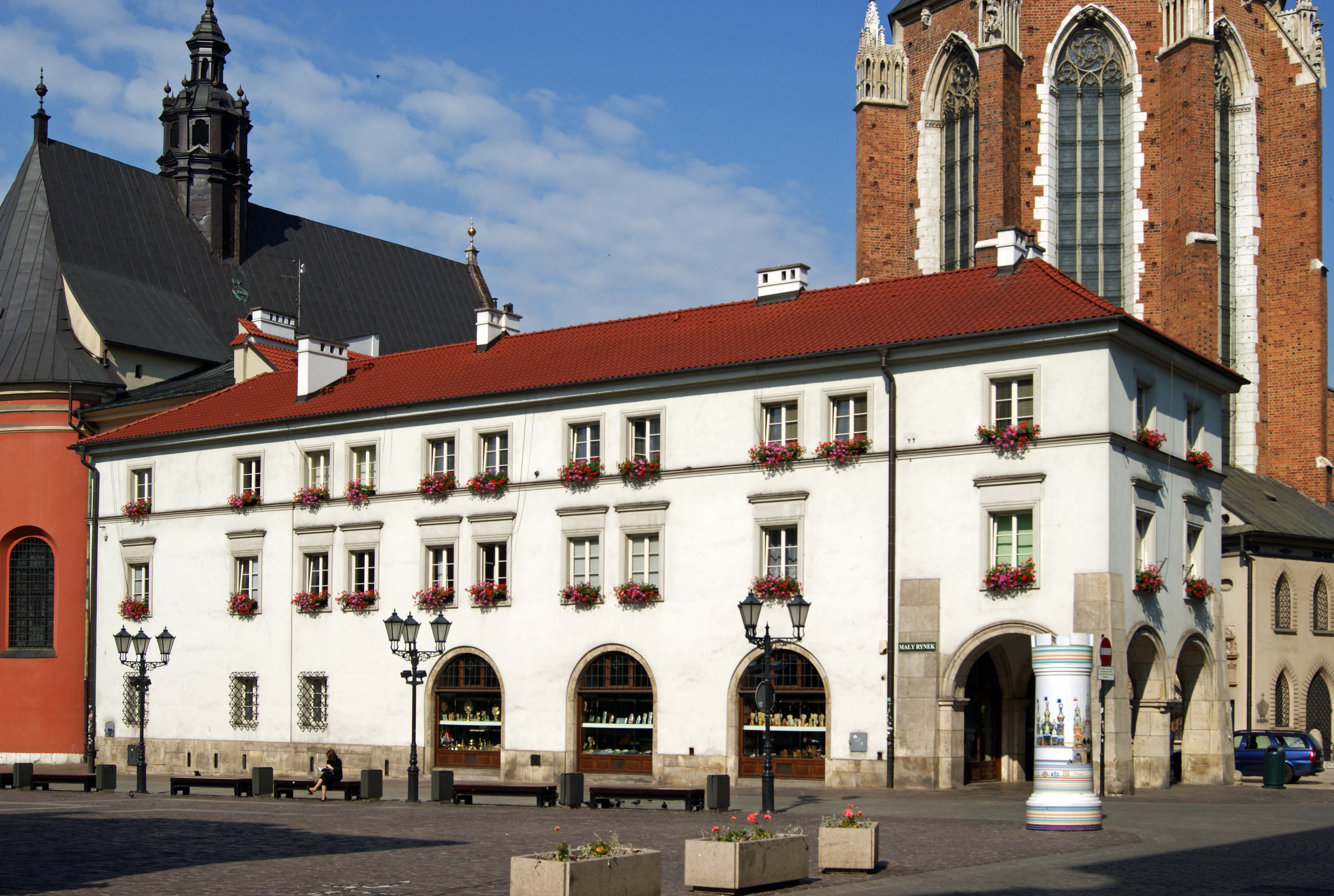

General information
- Address: 5 Mariacki Square; 11 Little Market Square
- Town or city: Kraków
- Country: Poland
- Coordinates: 50°03′41.48″N 19°56′24.84″E
- Completed: 1631 (first); 1936 (current)

Vicarage of Church of the Assumption of the Blessed Virgin Mary (Polish: Wikarówka Kościoła Wniebowzięcia Najświętszej Marii Panny) is a tenement house located in Kraków at Mariacki Square in District Old Town. The building separates it from the Little Market Square (Mały Rynek).

== History ==
The first vicarage building was erected here in 1631 in the Baroque style. In the mid-18th century, it was rebuilt according to a design by architect Franciszek Placidio. It stood until 1934, when it was demolished due to its poor technical condition, which posed a risk of structural collapse.

Simultaneously with the demolition, a debate arose regarding the future of the site. Some voices, including Marian Dąbrowski, editor-in-chief of Ilustrowany Kuryer Codzienny, argued for keeping Mariacki Square open toward the Little Market Square. However, the final decision favored constructing a new vicarage building, influenced by historical considerations and the fact that leaving the space empty would expose an overly stark contrast between the Gothic structure of St. Barbara's Church and its Baroque apse. The new building, designed by Franciszek Mączyński in a classicizing style, was completed in 1936.

On October 3, 1984, the tenement was entered into the Registry of Cultural Property. It is also entered into the municipal register of monuments of the Lesser Poland Voivodeship.
