= Ilustrowany Kuryer Codzienny (publisher) =

Polish publishing house

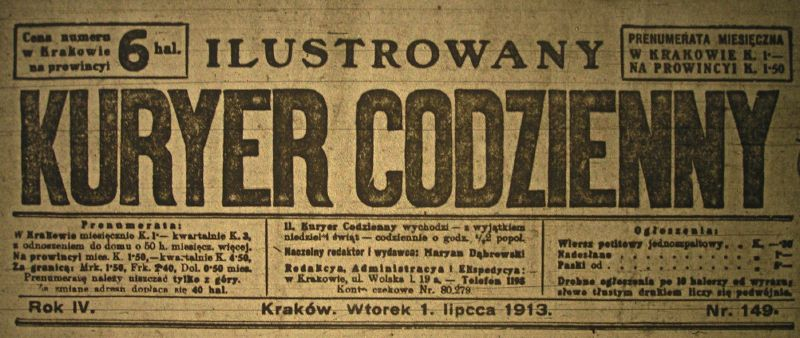
Illustrated Daily Courier, vignette, 1913

Ilustrowany Kuryer Codzienny (Polish pronunciation: [ilustrɔˈvanɨ ˈkurjɛr t͡sɔˈd͡ʑɛnnɨ], Illustrated Daily Courier), abbreviated IKC or Ikac, was a publishing house. Founded in 1910 in Kraków by Marian Dąbrowski, under the Second Polish Republic IKC was the biggest publisher in the country, with its newspapers and magazines having a circulation of more than 400,000.

The company started with its flagship, the Ilustrowany Kuryer Codzienny daily, and over time more titles were added.

The IKC introduced a number of innovations that significantly influenced the development of the press in Poland. One key element of the newspaper's success was its modern rail-based distribution system, which allowed for rapid distribution in the provinces, reaching readers the same day it was published. The newspaper also distinguished itself in terms of content and form, focusing on sensationalism, scandal, crime, and gossip, which captured readers' attention. It was illustrated with drawings, and the first page of each issue featured a large, sensational illustration, a novel approach at the time.

The publishing house quickly purchased a rotary printing press: a small rotary press purchased in Turkey. This was a technical innovation in Krakow printing. The press was positioned so that it was visible through the window from the street, providing an attractive attraction for passersby and a form of advertising for the newspaper. Marian Dąbrowski also demonstrated exceptional management acumen and innovative solutions, introducing a modern rail-based distribution system, which allowed for rapid and efficient distribution of the newspaper in the provinces.

The publishing house also established its own photo agency, "Światowid," which became the most important supplier of Polish photos to the foreign press. The newspaper established a network of branches and field correspondents in Poland and abroad, which allowed for wide distribution and accessibility of the newspaper. The branches and the main editorial office used teleprinters, radio stations, and even fultography, i.e., the transmission of photographs by radio—the forerunner of the fax machine.

It was the first Polish publisher to abolish the line method: it was reportedly unnecessary, because due to the excellent pay, journalists voluntarily tried to write as much as possible. The company employed over 1,000 people. As the owner, who began his career as a middle school teacher, Dąbrowski was renowned for his skill in selecting employees and for ensuring a diverse editorial team, employing both nationalists and communists.

In 1933, afternoon daily Tempo dnia was added. Other titles, published by the company were:

- Światowid - a high class monthly magazine,
- Na szerokim świecie - addressed to the readers from countryside,
- Raz, dwa, trzy - sports weekly,
- Tajny detektyw - criminal magazine,
- As - high-class weekly.

In the late 1930s, IKC employed some 1,000 people. In autumn 1939, following the Polish September Campaign, the company was closed by the Germans. Dąbrowski himself left Poland just before the war. He died in 1958 in Florida. His body was buried at Kraków's Rakowiecki Cemetery.

== Sources ==
- Ilustrowany Kuryer Codzienny
