= Dunajewski =

Dunajewski (feminine: Dunajewska) is a Polish surname. The Russian equivalent is Dunayevsky. Notable people with the surname include:

- Albin Dunajewski (1817–1894), Polish bishop
- Andrzej Dunajewski (1908–1944), Polish zoologist and ornithologist
