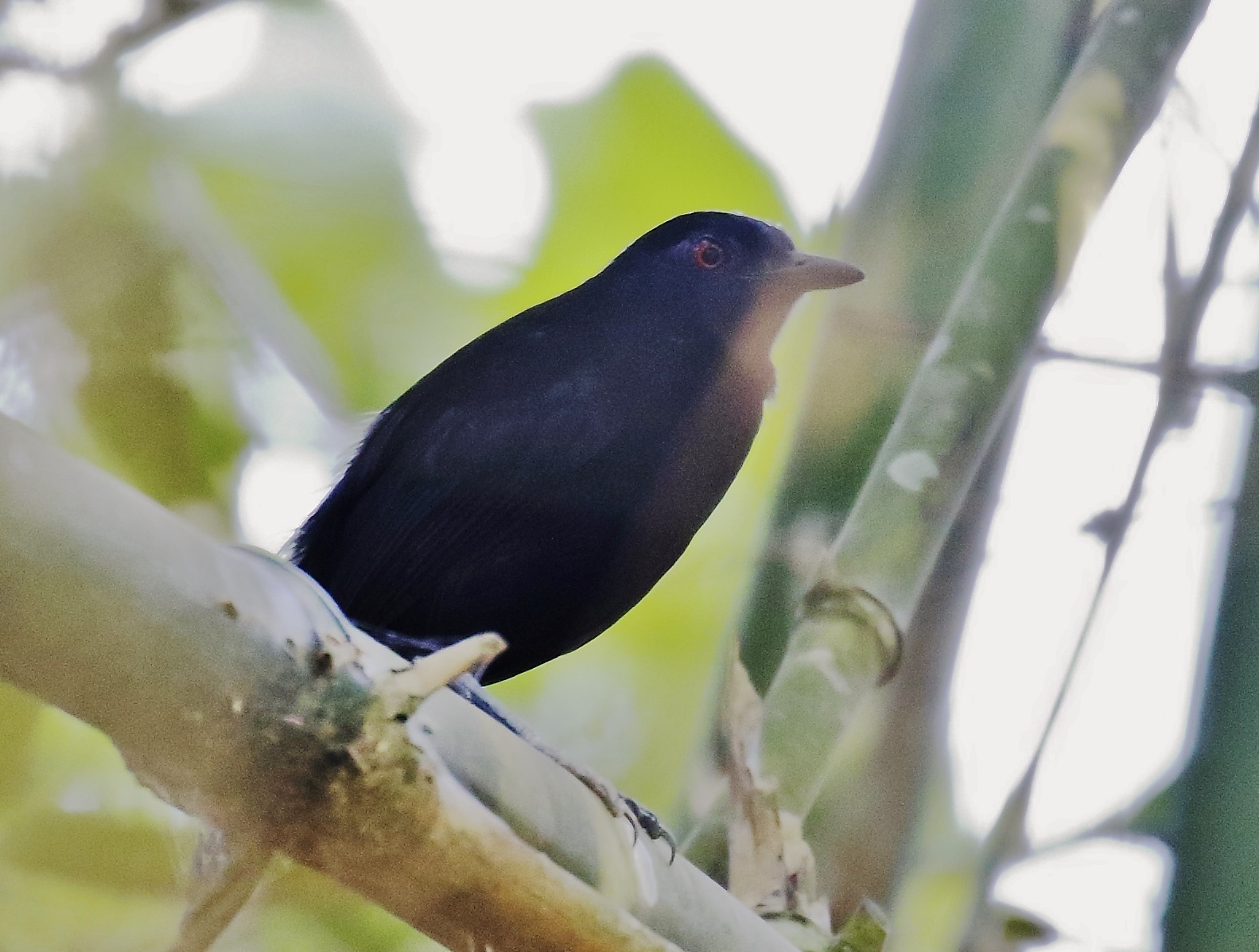
- Goeldi's antbird (Akletos goeldii)

Scientific classification
- Kingdom: Animalia
- Phylum: Chordata
- Class: Aves
- Order: Passeriformes
- Family: Thamnophilidae
- Genus: Akletos; Dunajewski, 1948

Type species
- Akletos peruvianus Dunajewski, 1948

= Akletos =

Genus of birds

Akletos is a genus of passerine birds in the family Thamnophilidae.

The genus contains two species:

- White-shouldered antbird (Akletos melanoceps)
- Goeldi's antbird (Akletos goeldii)

The two species were formerly placed in the genus Myrmeciza. A molecular phylogenetic study published in 2013 found that Myrmeciza, as then defined, was polyphyletic. In the resulting rearrangement to create monophyletic genera these species were moved to the resurrected genus Akletos which had been introduced by the Polish ornithologist Andrzej Dunajewski in 1948.
