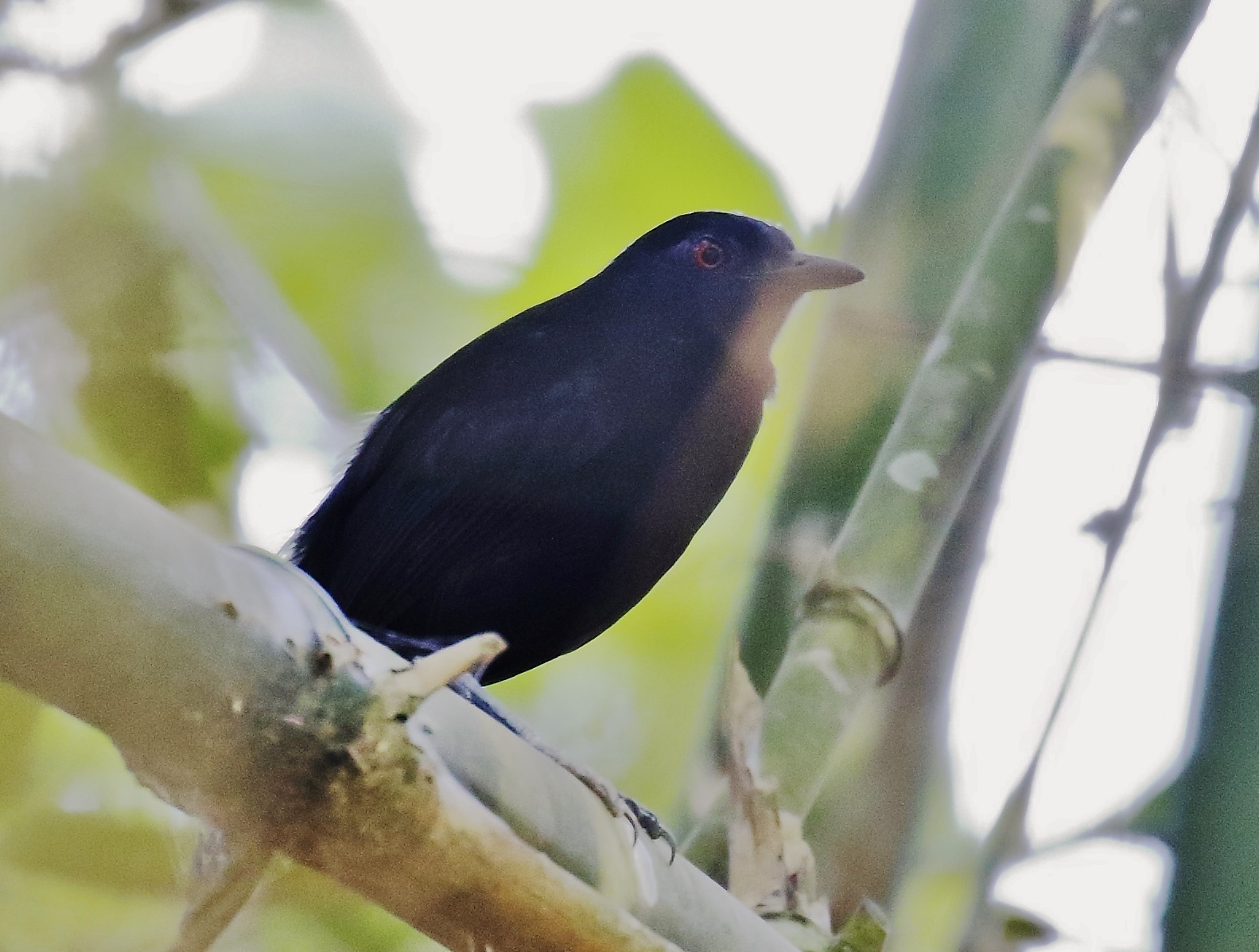

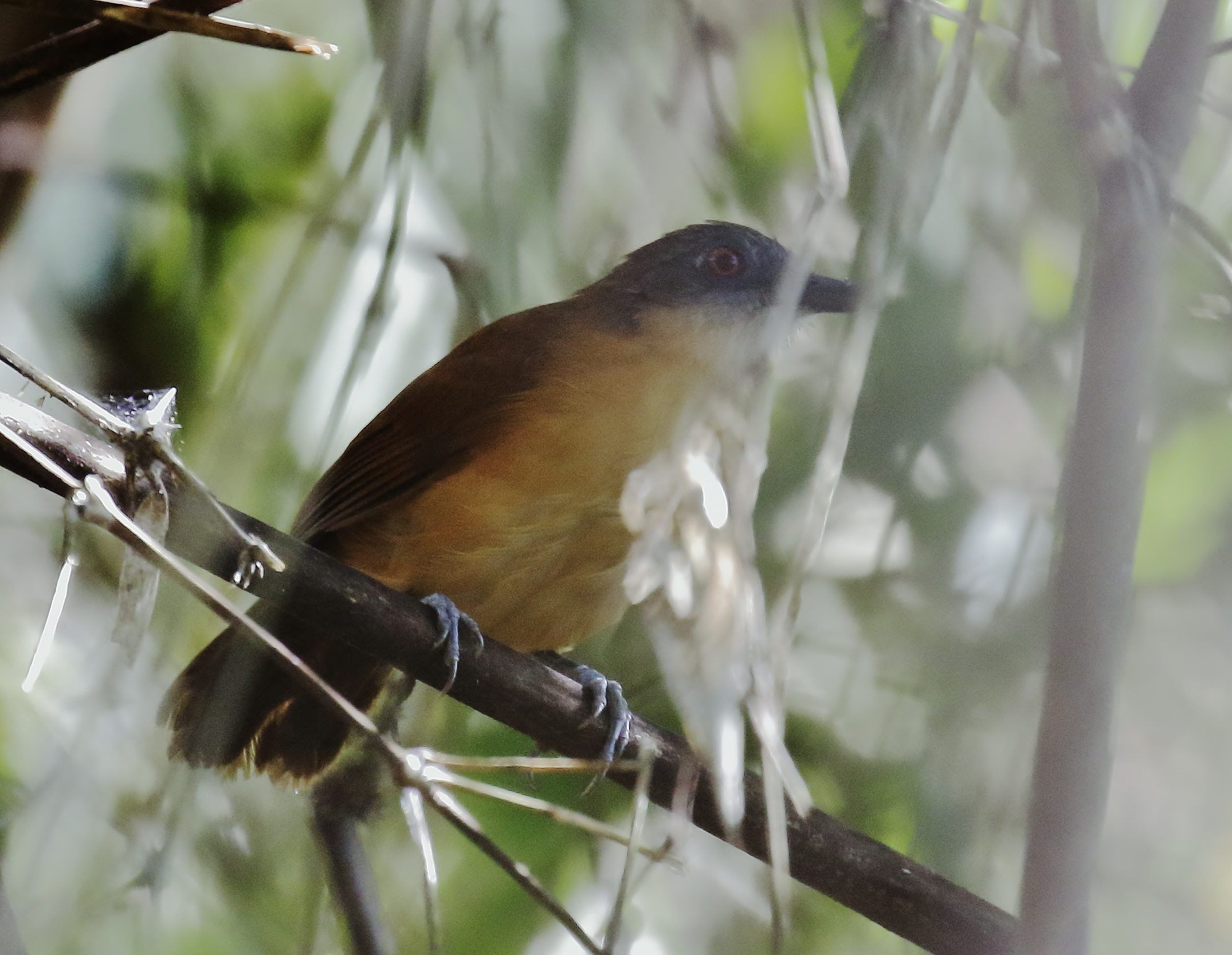
- Male above, female below

Conservation status
- Least Concern (IUCN 3.1)

Scientific classification
- Kingdom: Animalia
- Phylum: Chordata
- Class: Aves
- Order: Passeriformes
- Family: Thamnophilidae
- Genus: Akletos
- Species: A. goeldii

Binomial name
- Akletos goeldii (Snethlage, E, 1908)

Synonyms
- Myrmelastes goeldii; Percnostola goeldii; Myrmeciza goeldii

= Goeldi's antbird =

Species of bird

Goeldi's antbird (Akletos goeldii) is a species of bird in subfamily Thamnophilinae of family Thamnophilidae, the "typical antbirds". It is found in Bolivia, Brazil and Peru.

== Taxonomy and systematics ==
Goeldi's antbird was described in 1908 as Myrmelastes goeldii. It was later placed in genus Percnostola and later still in genus Myrmeciza. A molecular phylogenetic study published in 2013 found that Myrmeciza, as then defined, was polyphyletic. In the resulting rearrangement to create monophyletic genera, this species was moved to a newly created genus Inundicola. A year later the same authors determined that by the principle of priority the older genus Akletos, which had been introduced by the Polish ornithologist Andrzej Dunajewski in 1948, was proper.

Goeldi's antbird shares genus Akletos with the white-shouldered antbird (A. melanoceps). It is monotypic.

== Description ==
Goeldi's antbird is 17 to 18 cm (6.7 to 7.1 in) long and weighs about 42 g (1.5 oz). Both sexes have a ring of bare bluish gray skin around their eye, though the female's is paler, and a red iris. Adult males are mostly black with a usually concealed white patch between their scapulars. Adult females have a blackish gray forecrown, lores, and face. Their crown, upperparts, and wings are rufous-brown and their tail dark reddish brown. Their throat is white. Their underparts are mostly light cinnamon with tawny flanks and crissum.

== Distribution and habitat ==
Goeldi's antbird is a bird of the western Amazon Basin. It is found in southeastern Peru, northwestern Bolivia, and the western Brazilian states of Acre and Amazonas. It primarily inhabits the floor and understorey of várzea evergreen forest but also transitional forest, bamboo thickets, and secondary forest. It favors the shrubby vine-tangled areas immediately adjoining rivers and stands of Guadua bamboo on the river floodplain and on shelves above it. In elevation it mostly occurs below 500 m (1,600 ft) but reaches 800 m (2,600 ft) locally in Peru.

== Behavior ==
=== Movement ===
Goeldi's antbird is believed to be a year-round resident throughout its range.

=== Feeding ===
Goeldi's antbird feeds on insects and probably other arthropods. It typically forages singly, in pairs, or in family groups in dense vegetation, mostly on the ground and within about 2 m (7 ft) above it. It hops between short feeding stops, pumping its tail. It captures prey by gleaning, reaching, or pouncing to the ground from a perch. It occasionally, and perhaps regularly, follows army ant swarms to capture prey fleeing the ants and only occasionally joins mixed-species feeding flocks.

=== Breeding ===
The breeding season of Goeldi's antbird has not been detailed but spans from August to November in Peru and perhaps includes December in Brazil. Its nest is a cup made of dry leaves and twigs on or near the ground. Its clutch is one or two eggs that are white with reddish brown blotches. Both parents incubate the clutch. The incubation period, time to fledging, and other details of parental care are not known.

=== Vocalization ===
The song of Goeldi's antbird is "a series...beginning with 3 soft, rapidly delivered notes, first longer than second but shorter than third, followed by evenly paced series of downslurred whistles, notes shorter than intervals". One author writes it as "her-her hEEr hEEr hEEr hEEr". Its call is "a slow, electric chatter cher'che'che'che'che'che".

== Status ==
The IUCN has assessed Goeldi's antbird as being of Least Concern. It has a large range; its population size is not known and is believed to be stable. No immediate threats have been identified. It is considered fairly common across its range. Its range includes several large protected areas "as well as extensive intact habitat which is not formally protected but appears at little risk of development in near future".
