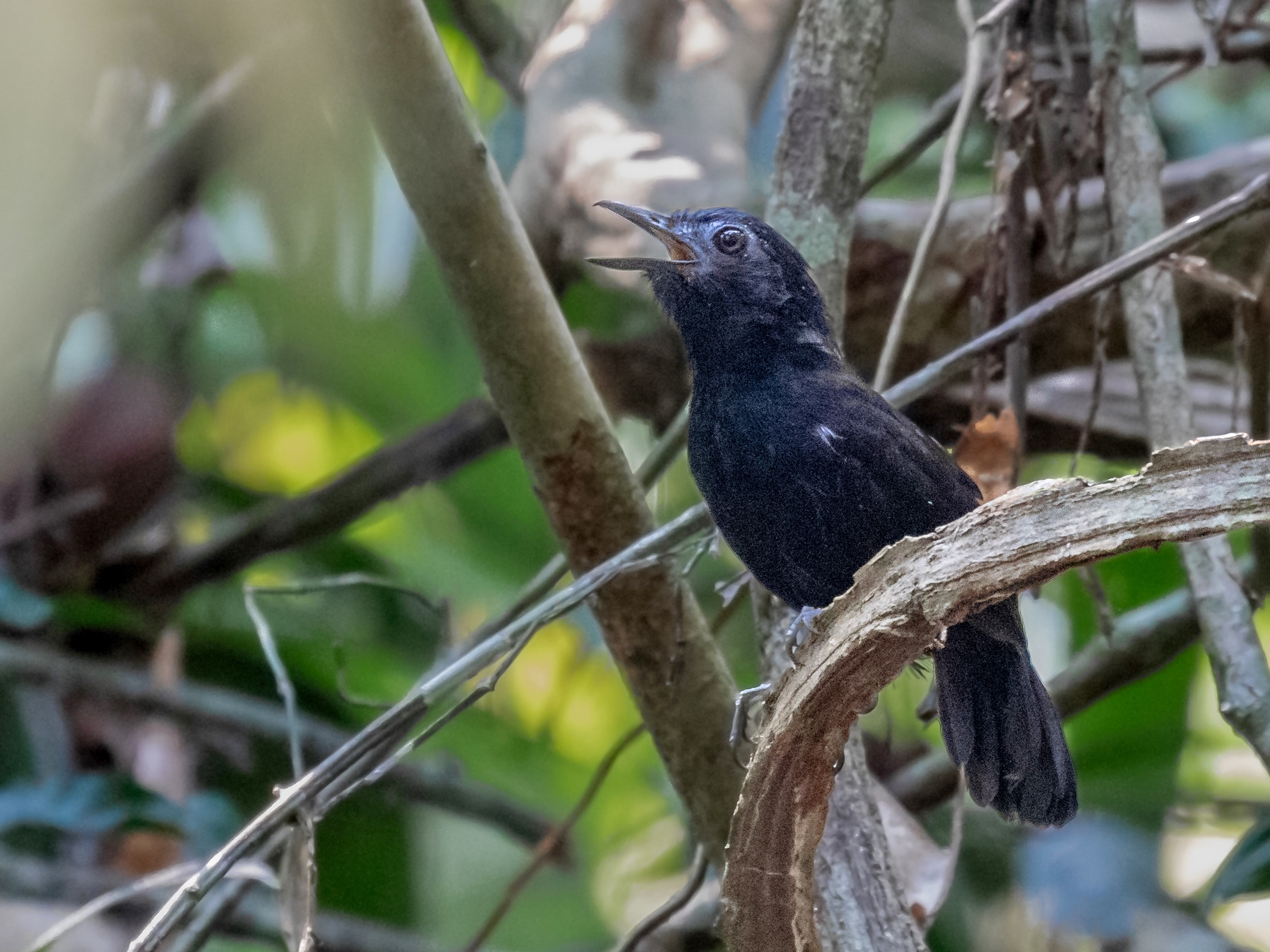
- Male
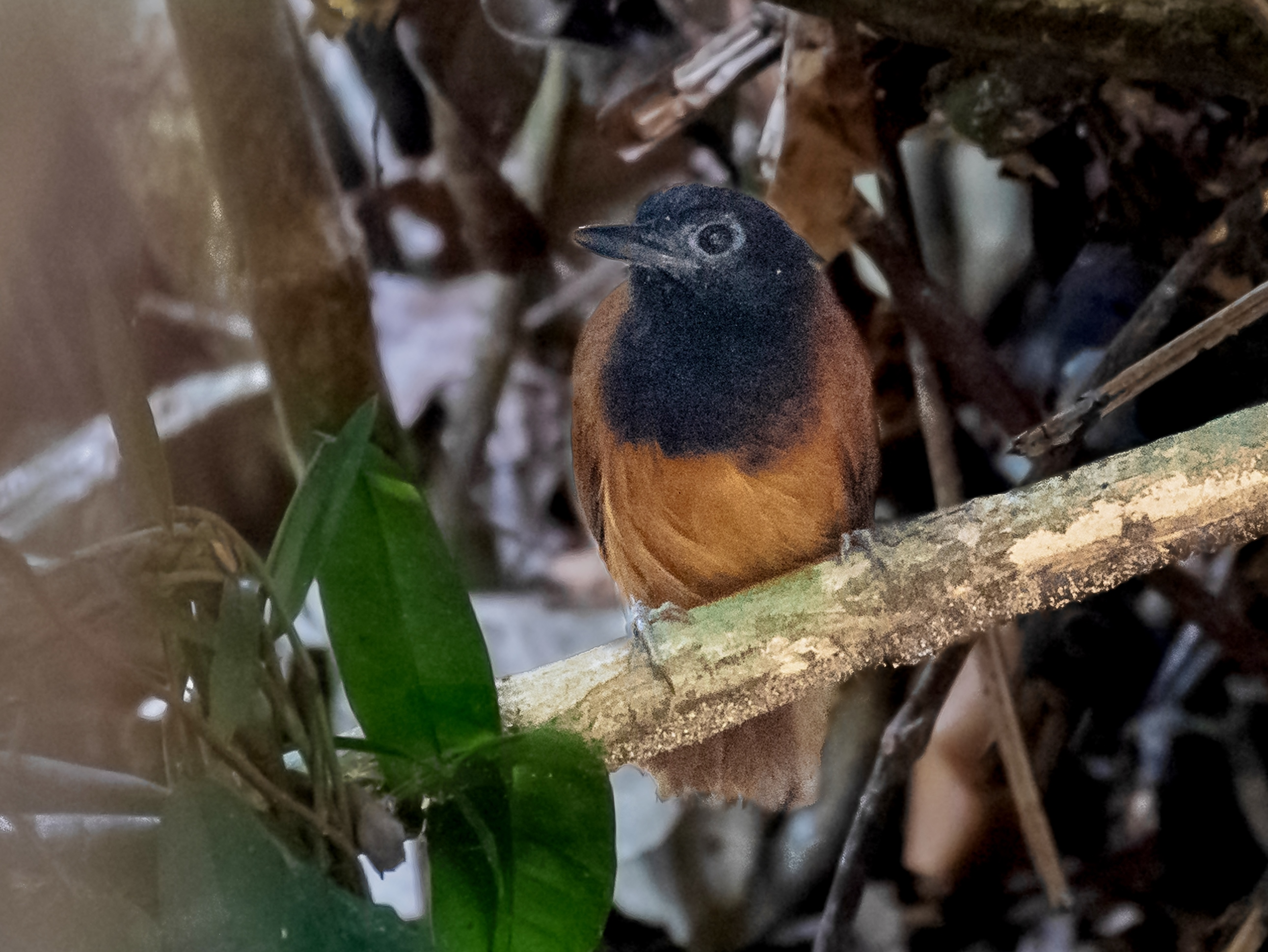
- Female

Conservation status
- Least Concern (IUCN 3.1)

Scientific classification
- Kingdom: Animalia
- Phylum: Chordata
- Class: Aves
- Order: Passeriformes
- Family: Thamnophilidae
- Genus: Akletos
- Species: A. melanoceps

Binomial name
- Akletos melanoceps (Spix, 1825)

Synonyms
- Myrmeciza melanoceps; Inundicola melanoceps

= White-shouldered antbird =

Species of bird

Song of white-shouldered antbird (Akletos melanoceps)

The white-shouldered antbird (Akletos melanoceps) is a species of bird in subfamily Thamnophilinae of family Thamnophilidae, the "typical antbirds". It is found in Brazil, Colombia, Ecuador, and Peru.

== Taxonomy and systematics ==
The white-shouldered antbird was described and illustrated by the German naturalist Johann Baptist von Spix in 1825 and given the binomial name Thamnophilus melanoceps. It was subsequently moved to the genus Myrmeciza. A molecular phylogenetic study published in 2013 found that Myrmeciza was polyphyletic. In the resulting rearrangement to create monophyletic genera, this species was moved to a newly created genus Inundicola. A year later the same authors determined that by the principle of priority the older genus Akletos, which had been introduced by the Polish ornithologist Andrzej Dunajewski in 1948, was proper.

The white-shouldered antbird shares genus Akletos with Goeldi's antbird (A. goeldii). It is monotypic.

== Description ==
The white-shouldered antbird is 17 to 18.5 cm (6.7 to 7.3 in) long and weighs 36 to 40 g (1.3 to 1.4 oz). Both sexes have a ring of bare blue skin around their eye and a red iris. Adult males are mostly black with a small white patch on their shoulder that is usually visible only in flight. Adult females have a black head, neck, upper mantle, and upper breast. The rest of their upperparts are rufous that is somewhat darker on the ends of their wings and tail. Their underparts are cinnamon-tawny that is lighter in the center of their belly.

== Distribution and habitat ==
The white-shouldered antbird is a bird of the western Amazon Basin. It is found from Meta Department in south-central Colombia south through eastern Ecuador into northeastern and east-central Peru as far as northern Ucayali Department and east into western Brazil as far as the Japurá and Juruá rivers. It primarily inhabits the floor and understorey of várzea evergreen forest but also transitional forest and nearby mature secondary forest. It mostly favors the shrubby vine-tangled areas immediately adjoining rivers and to a lesser extent similar edges of forest away from water. In elevation it reaches 500 m (1,600 ft) in Colombia and Ecuador.

== Behavior ==
=== Movement ===
The white-shouldered antbird is believed to be a year-round resident throughout its range.

=== Feeding ===
The white-shouldered antbird feeds on insects and probably other arthropods. It typically forages singly, in pairs, or in family groups in dense vegetation, mostly on the ground and within about 5 m (16 ft) above it. It hops between short feeding stops, pumping its tail. It captures prey by reaching, lunging from a perch, and with short flutter-flights. It occasionally follows army ant swarms to capture prey fleeing the ants and occasionally joins mixed-species feeding flocks.

=== Breeding ===
The white-shouldered antbird's breeding season has not been defined but appears to span July to February in Ecuador. Its one known nest was a deep cup woven of dead plant material and palm fibers placed in dead fronds of a live palm about 1 m (3 ft) above the ground. It contained two eggs that were white with purplish spots. Both parent incubated the clutch but other details of parental care are not known. The incubation period is also unknown; fledging occurred 10 to 11 days after hatch.

=== Vocalization ===
The white-shouldered antbird is more often heard than seen. Its song is "a short series...that begins with 2 soft notes, first longer than second, followed by mostly flat notes that become more intense and lengthen slightly". The song has been written as "pur, pee-ur pee-ur pee-ur pee-ur" and "her-her hEEr hEEr hEEr hEEr". Its calls include a "short (e.g. 0·09 seconds) 'chirp' ", a "short (e.g. 1·8 seconds) rattle beginning with [an] emphatic note, followed by evenly spaced notes", and a "slower, more melodic series of c. 6 notes that also starts with [an] emphatic note".

== Status ==
The IUCN has assessed the white-shouldered antbird as being of Least Concern. It has a very large range; its population size is not known and is believed to be stable. No immediate threats have been identified. It is considered common in Colombia, "numerous" in Ecuador, and fairly common in Peru and Brazil. Its range includes several large protected areas and also "encompasses extensive areas of intact habitat which, although not formally protected, appear unlikely to be threatened by development in the near future".
