= Artur Jurand =

Artur Jurand FRSE (20 March 1914 – 13 January 2000) was a Polish-born animal geneticist who did important work at the University of Edinburgh in the later 20th century. He anglicised his name to Arthur Jurand once settled in Scotland.

== Life ==
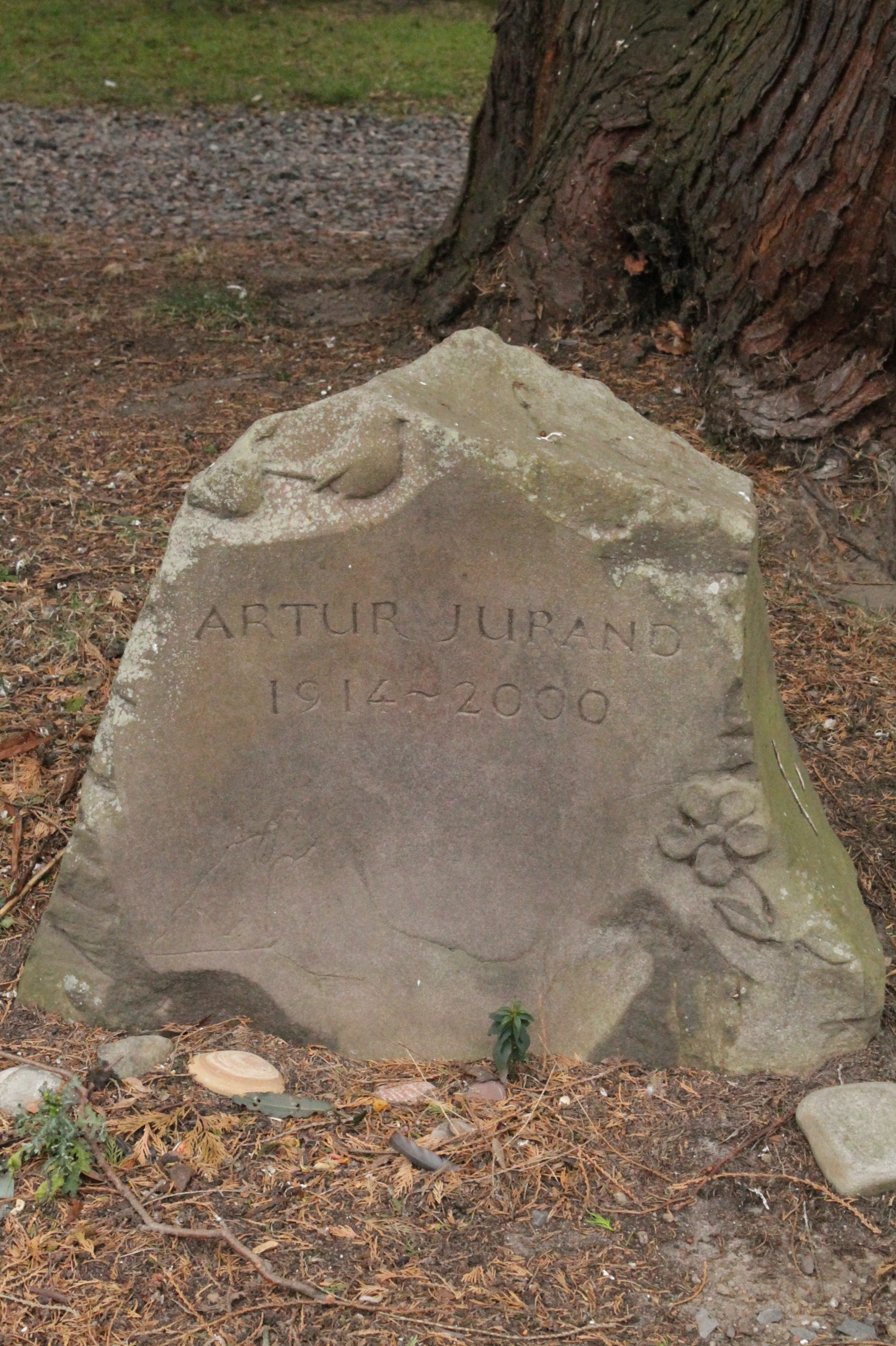
The grave of Dr Artur Jurand, Dean Cemetery

He was born Artur Jurand on 30 March 1914 in Silesia (what is today part of Poland). He studied Science at the University of Krakow gaining first a BSc then an MSc. As a postgraduate he received his first doctorate (PhD).

In the Second World War he was imprisoned in a concentration camp in Poland. After the war he worked at the Medical Academy in Krakow and from 1956 to 1959 he served as rector of a college in Krakow.

In 1961 he moved to Scotland and in particular to the University of Edinburgh, where he received a further doctorate (DSc), presenting the thesis "Teratogenic activity of selected drugs. Morphogenesis of the notochord and of the fore-limbs investigated at the light and electron microscope level : structure and development of certain subcellular organelles and cytoplasmic symbionts in Paramecium aurelia". He specialised in genetic abnormalities and began lecturing in teratology in 1963. He later was appointed Senior Lecturer in Animal Genetics and helped to establish the Institute of Animal Genetics. In the University of Edinburgh he worked alongside Charlotte Auerbach and Francis Albert Eley Crew at the Ashworth Buildings. Together they paved the way for animal cloning and the Dolly the Sheep project.

He was elected a Fellow of the Royal Society of Edinburgh in 1970. His proposers were Geoffrey Beale, Conrad Hal Waddington, Alan Robertson and Alan William Greenwood.

He retired in 1991 and died on 13 January 2000. He is buried in the section of the first north extension to Dean Cemetery in the west of Edinburgh. The grave lies under a tree close to the main entrance.

== Publications ==
- The Anatomy of Paramecium Aurelia (1969)
- Paramecium: Genetics and Epigenetics, co-written with Geoffrey Beale

== Family ==
His daughter, Maria K Jurand, followed in her father's footsteps, studying genetics at the University of Edinburgh and also gaining a doctorate.
