= Urszula Chowaniec =

Polish thinker and academic

Urszula Ulla Chowaniec
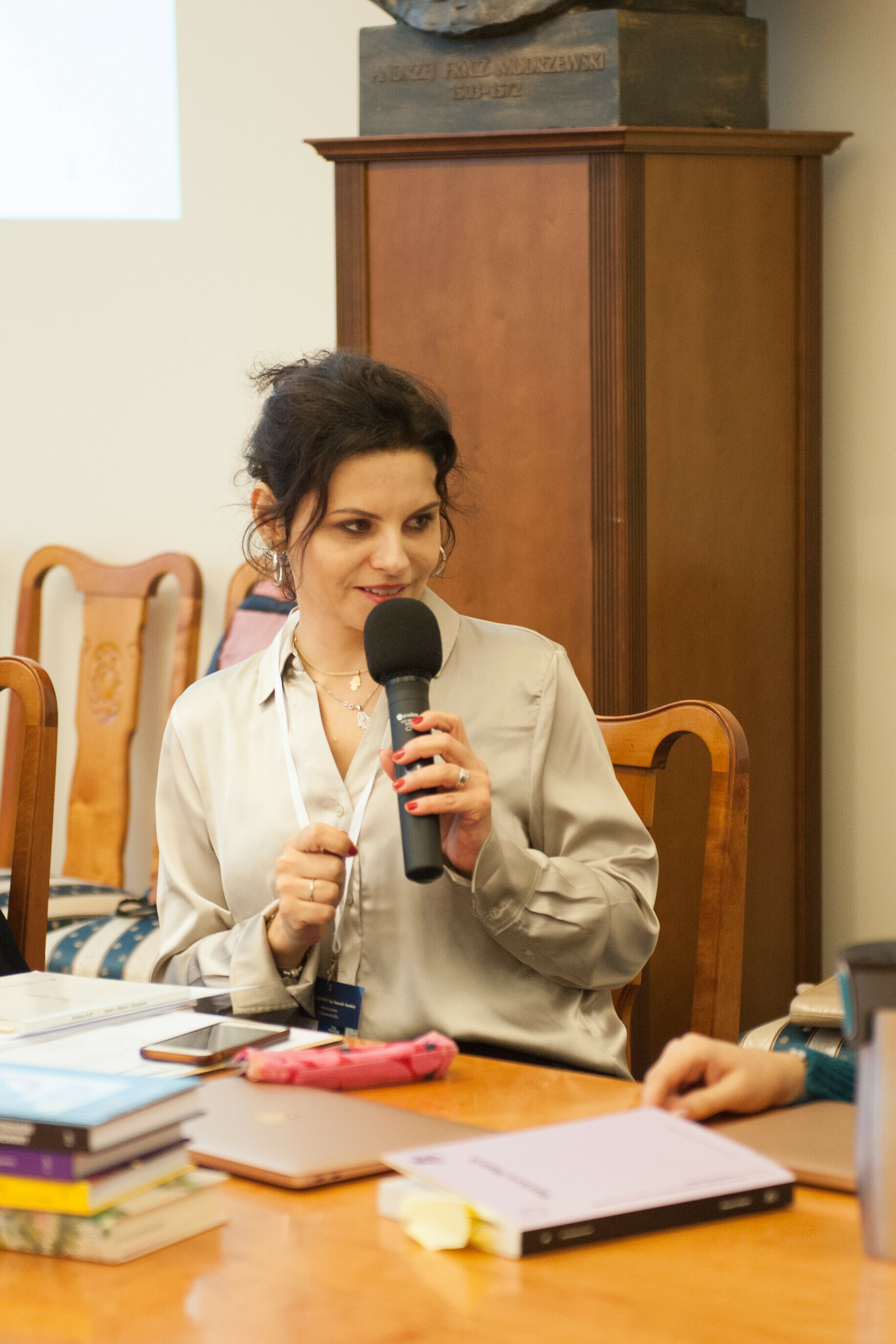
- Urszula Chowaniec w University College London, 2017
- Born: 17 May 1976 (age 50)

Education
- Education: Jagiellonian University

Philosophical work
- Era: Contemporary philosophy
- Region: Western philosophy
- School: Continental philosophy
- Institutions: Jagiellonian University, University College London, Tampere University, Lund University, Andrzej Frycz Modrzewski Kraków University
- Main interests: Literary criticism
- Notable ideas: feminist biography of Irena Krzywicka, women’s melancholy, Yiddish women’s literary history as alternative Yiddish literary history, the body as a women’s literary leitmotif′, Polish hertories

Urszula Chowaniec (born 17 May 1976), also Ulla Chowaniec is a Polish literary scholar, literary critic, and professor of humanities.

== Academic work ==
After completing her PhD, while working at University College London, she went to Finland, where she worked at the University of Tampere. Since 2007, she has been affiliated with the Andrzej Frycz Modrzewski Kraków Academy, where she teaches cultural and literary theory and history of literature, and culture of the Polish language. From 2011 to 2018, she worked in the Department of Slavonic East European Studies at University College London. Since 2020, she has been lecturing on Jewish women's literature in Stockholm at the European Paideia Institute for Jewish Research. In addition, she holds a professorship at the Andrzej Frycz Modrzewski Academy and is a lecturer at Lund University. She also holds an Honorary Research Fellowship in the Department of Slavonic and East European Studies at the University College of London. As part of her scholarly activities, she recorded with Katarzyna Tubylewicz the literary podcast SNACK: Stockholm Talks, and organises scholarly and artistic events. She has curated exhibitions and festivals, including One Hundred Years, so What? - an exhibition on the centenary of women's emancipation in Poland organised by the Centrala gallery in Birmingham. She is currently working on a monograph on the poetry of Irena Klepfisz Her most recent research focuses on Jewish history and Jewish identity in women's literature.

== Books and publications ==
- Threads of vulnerability: Migrant precarity and class-sensitive nostalgia in Wioletta Grzegorzewska’s autofiction. Journal of Postcolonial Writing, 61(4), 582–595.
- In Search of a Woman: On the Early Novels of Irena Krzywicka , WUJ 2007.
- Melancholic Migrating Bodies in Contemporary Polish Women's Writing, Cambridge Scholar Publishing, 2015
- See the list of publications at Google Scholar Profile
