= Danuta Gierulanka =

Polish mathematician, psychologist, and philosopher

Danuta Gierulanka

Danuta Gierulanka (1909–1995) was a Polish mathematics educator, psychologist, philosopher, and translator. She was associated with Roman Ingarden and known for her work in phenomenology and the philosophy of mathematics.

== Mathematics educator ==
Gierulanka was born in Kraków on 30 June 1909; her father was a civil servant. She studied mathematics at the Jagiellonian University from 1927 to 1932, completing a master's degree with a thesis on Periodic solutions of differential equations, and stayed there for another year for a teaching credential. From 1933 to 1938 she worked as a high school teacher of mathematics, science, and philosophy at two Kraków gymnasia.

== Psychologist ==
Gierulanka returned to the Jagiellonian University in 1938, as a psychology student working in the Laboratory of Experimental Psychology with Władysław Heinrich. Her studies were interrupted by World War II, during which she and her brother, physicist Jerzy Gierula, taught in secret. She completed her doctorate in 1947. Her dissertation, O przyswajaniu sobie pojęć geometrycznych [On Grasping Geometrical Notions], was published as a book in 1958.

Gierulanka remained at the Jagiellonian University, and in 1953 became an adjunct in mathematical analysis at the university, with the plan of writing a habilitation thesis combining mathematical analysis with psychology. However, this did not materialize and in 1957 she returned to the Laboratory of Experimental Psychology.

== Philosopher ==
In 1958 Gierulanka moved again, becoming an adjunct in philosophy. She became interested in Roman Ingarden's work in phenomenology, and wrote a habilitation thesis in 1962 on the phenomenology of mathematics, Zagadnienie swoistoici poznania matematycznego [On the Peculiarity of Mathematical Cognition], also published at the same time as a book. Failing to obtain a permanent position in philosophy, she returned to a posting in psychology at Jagiellonian, from which she retired in 1971. She died on 29 April 1995 in Kraków.

After her habilitation work, Gierulanka became one of the editors of Ingarden's collected works. She also translated works of Ingarden, Edmund Husserl, and Edith Stein into Polish.
