= Raz, dwa, trzy (newspaper) =

Polish weekly sports magazine (1931-39)

Raz, dwa, trzy was a Polish illustrated sports weekly magazine published in Kraków by Ilustrowany Kurier Codzienny during the Second Republic. A total of 465 issues were published: its first issue was dated 21 April 1931, while the final one was dated 3 September 1939.

== Newspaper ==
The weekly was headed by managing editor Adam Obrubański, with Marian Dabrowski of IKC listed as publisher and editor-in-chief. The magazine covered sports events from throughout Poland and internationally. In 1936, Raz, dwa, trzy was one of the major sports newspapers from Poland covering the Olympic Games in Berlin. Following German and Soviet aggression on Poland, the weekly ceased to exist.
