= Dunayevsky =

Dunayevsky, Dunayevski, Dunayevskii, Dunaevsky, etc. (Russian: Дунаевский) is an East Slavic masculine surname, its feminine counterpart is Dunayevskaya or Dunayevskaia. The surname derives from the Danube River, which is called Dunay in Russian.

The Polish-language equivalent is Dunajewski.

The surname may refer to

- Isaak Dunayevsky (1900–1955), Soviet film composer and conductor
- Maksim Dunayevsky (born 1945), Soviet film composer, son of Isaak
- Raya Dunayevskaya (1910–1987), American Marxist
- Plane Jane (born 1998), American drag queen
