= Ochaby =

- Sołectwo
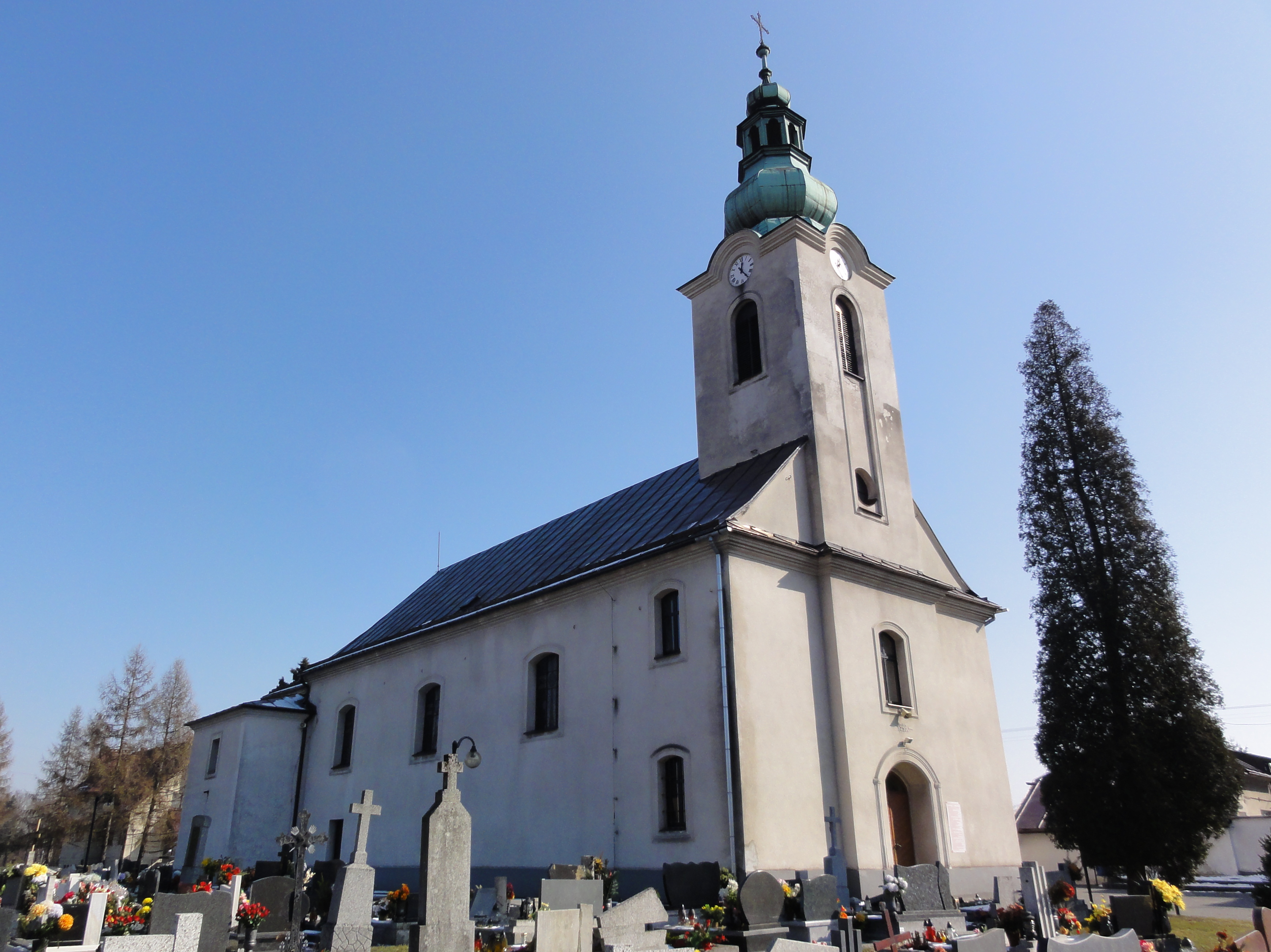
- Church of Saint Martin

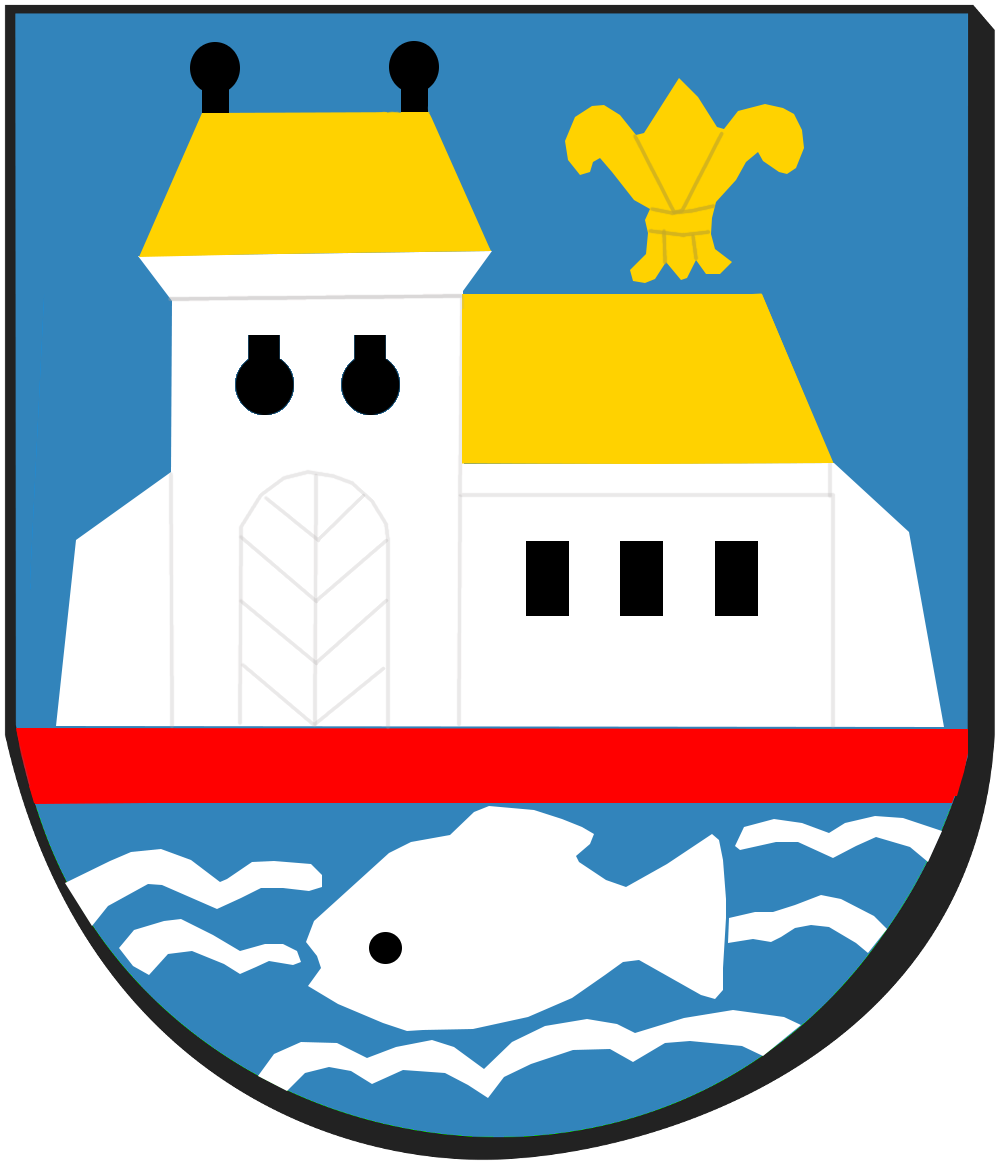
- Coat of arms

- Location within Poland
- Coordinates: 49°50′29″N 18°46′6.82″E
- Country: Poland
- Voivodeship: Silesian
- County: Cieszyn
- Gmina: Skoczów
- First mentioned: ca. 1305

Government
  - Mayor: Maciej Bieniek

Area
  - Total: 13.18 km^{2} (5.09 sq mi)

Population (2016)
  - Total: 2,128
  - Density: 161.5/km^{2} (418.2/sq mi)
- Time zone: UTC+1 (CET)
  - Summer (DST): UTC+2 (CEST)
- Car plates: SCI

Ochaby is a sołectwo in Gmina Skoczów, Cieszyn County, Silesian Voivodeship, southern Poland. It consists of two villages: Ochaby Wielkie and Ochaby Małe. It is known from a large horse stud farm, one of the largest in Silesia.

== Etymology ==
The name of the villages are of topographic origin, a plural form of the Slavic-rooted word ochab, denoting swamp, quagmire or bog. The supplementary adjectives Wielkie and Małe mean Great(er)/Large and Lesser/Small respectively.

== History ==
The settlement lies in the historical region of Cieszyn Silesia. It was first mentioned in a Latin document of Diocese of Wrocław called Liber fundationis episcopatus Vratislaviensis from around 1305 as item in Ochabe. It meant that the village was in the process of location (the size of land to pay a tithe from was not yet precise). The creation of the village was a part of a larger settlement campaign taking place in the late 13th century on the territory of what would later be known as Upper Silesia.

Politically the village belonged initially to the Duchy of Teschen, formed in 1290 in the process of feudal fragmentation of Poland and was ruled by a local branch of Silesian Piast dynasty. In 1327 the duchy became a fee of the Kingdom of Bohemia, which after 1526 became a part of the Habsburg monarchy.

The village became a seat of a Catholic parish, mentioned in the register of Peter's Pence payment from 1447 among the 50 parishes of Teschen deanery as Ochabn. After 1540s Protestant Reformation prevailed in the Duchy of Teschen and a local Catholic church was taken over by Lutherans. It was taken from them (as one from around fifty buildings) in the region by a special commission and given back to the Roman Catholic Church on 15 April 1654.

After the Revolutions of 1848 in the Austrian Empire a modern municipal division was introduced in the re-established Austrian Silesia. The village as a municipality was subscribed to the political district of Bielsko and the legal district of Strumień. According to the censuses conducted in 1880, 1890, 1900 and 1910 the population of the municipality grew from 1070 in 1880 to 1101 in 1910 with a dwindling majority being native Polish-speakers (99.9% in 1880 to 93.3% in 1910) accompanied by a growing German-speaking minority (1 person in 1880 to 72 or 6.7% in 1910), in terms of religion in 1910 majority were Roman Catholics (64.8%), followed by Protestants (34.6%) and Jews (7 people). The village was also traditionally inhabited by Cieszyn Vlachs, speaking Cieszyn Silesian dialect.

After World War I, the fall of Austria-Hungary, the Polish–Czechoslovak War (the Battle of Skoczów took place nearby) and the division of Cieszyn Silesia in 1920, it became a part of Poland. It was then annexed by Nazi Germany at the beginning of World War II. After the war it was restored to Poland.

== Geography ==
Ochaby lies in the southern part of Poland, approximately 5 km (3 mi) north of the nearest town, Skoczów, 14 km (9 mi) north-east of the county seat, Cieszyn, 20 km (12 mi) north-west of Bielsko-Biała, 50 km (31 mi) south-west of the regional capital Katowice, and 12 km (7.5 mi) east of the border with the Czech Republic.

The settlement is situated on both banks of the Vistula, in Oświęcim Basin, between roughly 270–320 m (890–1,050 ft) above sea level, 14 km (8.7 mi) north-west of the Silesian Beskids. The sołectwo is further subdivided into Ochaby Wielkie (the northern part) and Ochaby Małe (the southern part). There are numerous fish ponds in Ochaby.

== People ==
Józef Pieter, Polish psychologist, was born here.
