= Józefa Hennelowa =

Polish publicist, journalist and politician

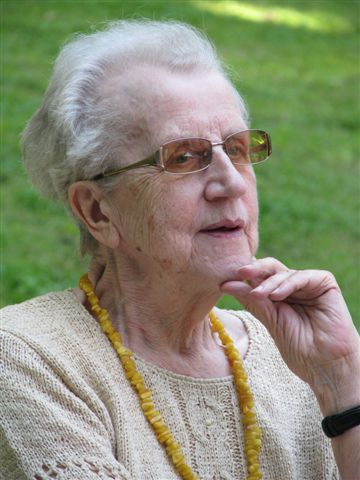
- Hennelowa in 2008

Member of the Sejm
- In office 1989–1993

Personal details
- Born: Józefa Maria Golmont; 1 April 1925 Vilnius, Poland
- Died: 22 August 2020 (aged 95) Kraków, Poland
- Spouse: Jacek Hennel (?–2014; his death)
- Children: Three

Józefa Maria Hennelowa (1 April 1925 – 22 August 2020) was a Polish publicist, journalist, columnist, Catholic intellectual, and politician. As a journalist, she spent more than seven decades as a reporter and editor at Tygodnik Powszechny, a Catholic weekly newspaper headquartered in Kraków. Hennelowa also served in the Sejm, the lower house of the Parliament of Poland, from 1989 until 1993 during the country's transition from communism to democracy.

== Biography ==
Józefa Hennelowa was born Józefa Maria Golmont on 1 April 1925 in Vilnius, Poland (modern-day Lithuania), to an ethnic Polish family. Her father was a tailor who created cassocks for Catholic clergy. She originally wanted to be a violinist, rather than a journalist, and became interested in Juliusz Osterwa's life and career while studying in Kraków. During World War II, she joined the women's wing of the Gray Ranks, an underground resistance group opposed to the German occupation, and secretly taught in Vilnius. Following the war and the incorporation of Vilnius into the Soviet Union, Hennelowa moved to the new post-war Poland. She was a graduate of Jagiellonian University in Kraków.

She worked as the Institute of Nuclear Physics Polish Academy of Sciences in Kraków from 1954 to 1956 and then the Kraków office of the Ossolineum.

Hennelowa joined the Klub Inteligencji Katolickiej, or Club of Catholic Intelligentsia, in 1956. She also became involved with the Association of Polish Journalists.

Hennelowa first joined the staff of Tygodnik Powszechny, a Catholic weekly published in Kraków, as a proofreader in 1948. She rose over her career to become a reporter, then the newspaper's editor, and secretary of the editorial office. From 1982 until 2012, Hennelowa published a series of regular columns and opinion pieces, including "Widziane z Domu", "Z Domu i not Only", "Votum separatum", and "Na marginesie." She remained deputy editor-in-chief until 2008.

In 1984, Father Jerzy Popiełuszko, a Catholic priest associated with Solidarity, was assassinated by agents from the Ministry of Public Security, the country's secret police. Hennelowa covered the murder trial for Tygodnik Powszechny, though state censors made her work difficult.

In 1989, as Communist rule began to wane, Hennelowa and her husband, Jacek Hennel, joined the Citizens' Movement for Democratic Action (ROAD), a short-lived political party. Hennelowa was elected to the Contract Sejm, the transitional parliament, in 1989 as a ROAD candidate, serving her first term from 1989 to 1991. When ROAD split, she and her faction joined Tadeusz Mazowiecki's new Democratic Union (UD), where she became one the party's founding members in 1990. As a UD member, Hennelowa was re-elected to the Sejm in 1991, where she served until 1993. Hennelowa later became a member of the Freedom Union from 1994 to 1999.

She ran afoul of some in the Polish political right-wing, who falsely accused her of being pro-abortion. Hennelowa, however, was anti-abortion, but she also strongly opposed punishments for women who chose to undergo an abortion.

Hennelowa belonged to Amnesty International from 1990 to 1996, the Association "Polish Community", also from 1990 until 1996, and the Social Committee for the Restoration of Kraków's Monuments (SKOZK) until 2008.

She was the author of numerous books and publications, many of which focused on Catholicism. She also co-authored a biography of actor Juliusz Osterwa, which she wrote with Jerzy Szaniawski.

For her work, Hennelova was awarded the Commander's Cross of the Order of Polonia Restituta and the Order of St. Gregory the Great, one of the Vatican's highest honors, which was presented to her by Cardinal Stanisław Dziwisz.

Józefa Hennelowa died on 22 August 2020 at the age of 95. Her husband, Jacek Hennel, a physics professor, died in 2014. The couple had three children: Agnieszka (born 1955), Teresa (born 1956), and Franciszek (born 1962).

== Orders and decorations ==
- Cross of Merit (1974)
- Commander's Cross of the Order of Polonia Restituta (2000)
- Medal of Merit for Tolerance (2001)
- Kraków Book of the Month (June 2012)
- Badge of Honor of the Lesser Poland Voivodeship - Lesser Poland Cross (2014)
- Order of St. Gregory the Great - Vatican (2015)

== See also ==
- List of Jagiellonian University people
