= Franciszka Szymakowska =

Polish geologist (1927–2007)

- Born: February 5, 1927; Kraków, Poland
- Died: 2007 (aged 79–80)
- Education: Geology
- Alma mater: Jagiellonian University
- Known for: Carpathian geology, stratigraphy, scientific drawing, geological maps
- Awards: Best worker of the Polish Geological Institute, Best Geologist of Poland
- Scientific career
- Workplaces: Polish Geological Institute

Franciszka "Niusia" Szymakowska-Birkenmajer (5 February 1927 – 2007) was a Polish geologist. She worked at the Polish Geological Institute in Warsaw, and an important figure in the development of Carpathian geology. Her main research interests were the stratigraphy and tectonics of the Carpathians. Franciszka Szymakowska was best known for her detailed geological drawings that are still used today. Most geological maps at her time were drawn by with pencil and colours, and Szymakowska was able to capture the most complex geological features in accurate and detailed images.

== Biography ==
Franciszka Szymakowska was born in Kraków on 5 February 1927. She did her studies at the Faculty of Mathematics and Natural Sciences of the Jagiellonian University and graduated in 1952. During her studies, she started working at the Polish Geological institute, with which she remained affiliated until her retirement in 1997.

Early in her career, she started studying the stratigraphy of the Carpathians, in particular the Krosno rock formation. She continued working on the stratigraphy of the Central Carpathians for the following decade. She travelled to rural areas in southern Poland and Ukraine to study the Silesian Serra Senon formation in the area of Kobyl.

Before obtaining her doctoral degree, Szymakowska had already published multiple single first-author articles, and had been involved in many collaborations, for which she mainly worked on the stratigraphy. She received her PhD in natural sciences on 20 June 1970, and in 1973 she was appointed Associate Professor in the Carpathian Department at the Polish Geological Institute. She was also an active member of the Geological Society in Poland. She organized and participated in scientific conferences, both national and international.

Franciszka Szymakowska is best remembered for her very detailed geological maps. During those times, most geological images and maps were drawn with pencils and colours by hand. Her graphical talent allowed her to create detailed and clear images that accompanied her work that are still used today. Even after Szymakowska's retirement on 28 February 1997, her colleagues would rely on her drawing skills and steady hand for technical drawings of geological surveys and maps.

Towards the end of her life, the geological maps that she had drawn were incorporated in a collective Polish geological mapping effort to make the Geological Map of Poland on a small scale (1:50000). Her maps were used for the areas covering the Polish Carpathians, including the regions of Osielec, Sucha, Kalawri, Zebrzydowska, Pilzno, Frysztak and Jedlicze. Her contributions were very valuable, as she created not only maps but also cross-sections on which the collaborators greatly relied.

In 2000, a few years after she retired, Franciszka Szymakowska married Krysztof Birkenmajer, a geologist from the Jagiellonian University.

Between 2001 and 2005, Franciszka Szymakowska occupied herself with the drawing of a clean, coloured geological map of Poland, which would consist of eleven different sheets. She died in 2007, and was not able to finish her work. Szymakowska's map was printed in its original scale (1:5000) in 2014 to 2016

== Research ==
Franciszka Szymakowska made a major contribution to the understanding of the geology of the Carpathians. Her publications included detailed field observations of the stratigraphy and structural geology of the Carpathians, accompanied with accurate and detailed hand-made drawings.

== Awards and honours ==
In 1979, she was honoured as the best worker of the Geological Institute ("Zasluzony Pracownik Instytutu Geologicznego").

In 1981, she was awarded the best Geologist of Poland (“Zasluzony dla Polskiej Geologii”).
