= Władysław Heinrich =

Polish historian (1869–1957)

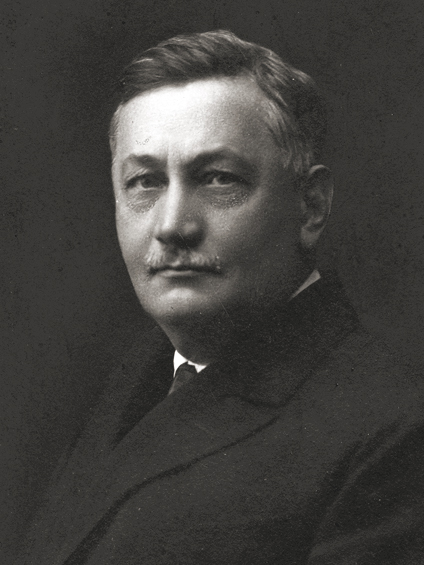
Władysław Heinrich

Władysław Heinrich (Warsaw, 1 January 1869 – 30 June 1957, Kraków, Poland) was a Polish historian of philosophy, psychologist, professor at Kraków University and member of the Polish Academy of Learning.

== Life ==
Władysław Heinrich studied mathematics, the natural sciences and philosophy. In philosophy he was a student of Richard Avenarius at the University of Zurich and applied his radical positivism to psychology: Heinrich pointed out that the new experimental psychology of the time was based on metaphysical concepts and premises, on constructions and introjections. In opposition to it, he proposed a psychology based on pure experiment (Die moderne physiologische Psychologie in Deutschland—Modern Physiological Psychology in Germany, 1897).

Settling in Kraków, Heinrich conducted research in this spirit (Teorie i wyniki badań psychologicznych—Theories and Results of Psychological Research, 1902). He authored the first report in experimental psychology to be presented to the Academy of Learning, O wahaniach natężenia zaledwie dostrzegalnych wrażeń (On Fluctuations in the Intensity of Barely Perceptible Sensations, 1898).

Heinrich worked at Kraków University in the physics department, then took over a chair of psychology and philosophy. He was also active in the history of philosophy (proposing the creation, in the Academy of Learning, of the Committee for the History of Philosophy in Poland). Above all, he was the first in Kraków to develop the new radical empiricist philosophy connected with the natural sciences. He was concerned especially with methodological questions, and was the first to present these at the Academy of Learning.

== Works ==
- Die moderne physiologische Psychologie in Deutschland (Modern Physiological Psychology in Germany, 1897, in German)
- O wahaniach w natężeniu zaledwie dostrzegalnych wrażeń optycznych i akustycznych (On Fluctuations in the Intensity of Barely Perceptible Optical and Acoustic Sensations, 1899)
- Przegląd badań nad wrażeniami barwnymi (A Review of Research into Color Sensation, 1901)
- Teorie i wyniki badań psychologicznych (Theories and Results of Psychological Research, 1902)
- Psychologia uczuć (The Psychology of Feelings, 1907)
- Johannes Scotus Eriugena i Spinoza (Johannes Scotus Eriugena and Spinoza, 1909)
- Filozofia grecka do Platona (Greek Philosophy to Plato, 1914)
- Stereoskopia monokularna (Monocular Stereoscopy, 1936)
- Les fonctions des capillaires et la concentration de l'attention (Capillary Functions and Concentration of Attention, 1938, in French, with Tomasz Strzembosz)
- Notes sur les reactions de capillaires pendant l'excitation des centres visuels de l'ecorce cerebrale (Notes on Capillary Reactions during Excitation of Cerebral-Cortex Visual Centers, 1938, in French)

== See also ==
- History of philosophy in Poland
- List of Poles
