= Józef Pieter =

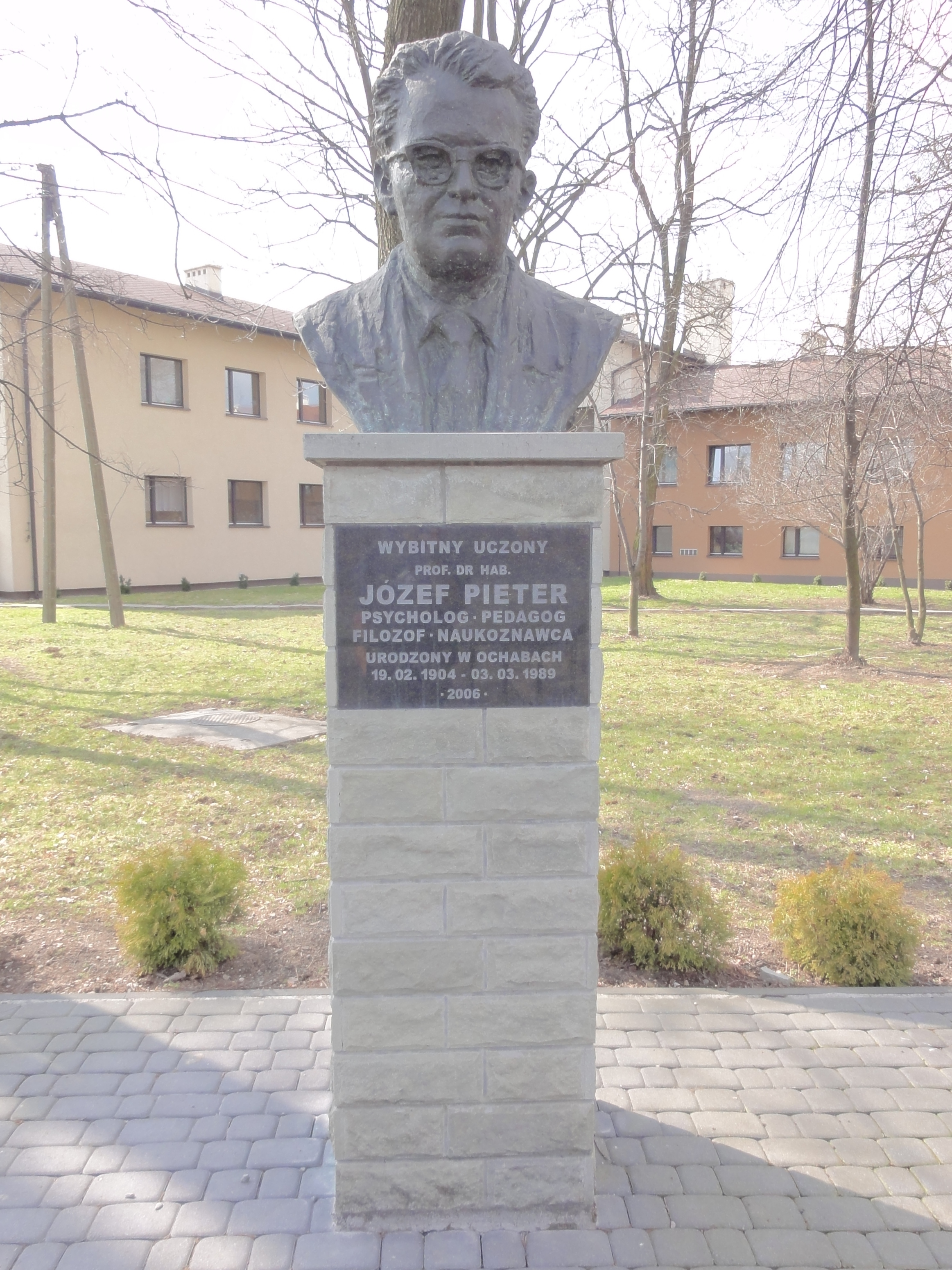
Monument to Józef Pieter in his native Ochaby

Józef Pieter (19 February 1904 in Ochaby – 3 March 1989) was a Polish psychologist, philosopher, pedagogue, researcher, and lecturer.

Pr. Pieter dedicated his life and work to the study of the psychology and mechanisms of teaching and learning, the comparison of pedagogical systems, the process of reasoning and the methodology and organisation of scientific work.

Pr. Pieter earned his PhD at the Jagiellonian University and passed his habilitation at the University of Poznań. Pr. Pieter is the author of over 230 scientific publications.

== Education ==
Born in Ochaby, the country side of Cieszyn, in South Western Poland, Pr. J. Pieter studied history, philosophy, psychology and pedagogy at the Jagellonian University of Cracow. He earned his PhD in Philosophy and Classical Philology from this institution in 1928. He later received his habilitation from the University of Poznan in 1945.

== Academic Life and Functions ==
Pr. J. Pieter was the Chair of Psychology at the University of Łódź, University of Warsaw and Akademia Wychowania Fizycznego (AWF) in Warsaw. Post-war, he re-organised the Institute of Pedagogy as well as the Wyzsza Szkola Pedagogiczna (WSP) of Katowice, that he was the elected Rector of for 4 terms until its integration into the University of Silesia upon its creation in 1968, where he then was the Chair Professor of Psychology.

Pr. J. Pieter is also known as a founding father of the University of Silesia. As early as 1929, he published a manifesto calling upon its creation, that would only happen in 1968 (" Thoughts on the Organisation of Scientific Work and Research in Silesia ").

During World War Two, Pr. J. Pieter was an active participant in the Underground Education System that allowed students to follow a school and university curriculum during the war.

The early encounter with psychology, and the field of pedagogy in particular, cannot be dissociated from the even earlier encounter with nature that Pr. J. Pieter studied throughout his life in the specific fields of Botanics and Physical Geography, leading him to become a vocal speaker for the preservation of natural areas and landscape. He also had a well known fascination for the mountains and in particular his local Beskidy.

== Psychology of Pedagogy and Learning ==
Pr. Jozef Pieter is the author of over 230 scientific publications, amongst which 50 books, in the fields of :

Psychology : psychology of teaching and learning, psychology of knowledge and science, intellectual thought process, psychobiography, behavioral psychology, history of psychology, psychology of philosophy

Pedagogy : history of pedagogy, sociology of education, pedagogy as a science, methodology, organisation of education, technical and scientific education, self education, scientific controversies.

== Personal life ==
He married Aldona Herwa in 1936. He has a son, Jacek Pieter (born 1938) and a daughter, Ewa Pieter (born 1945), as well as 4 grandchildren.

Danuta Pieter (born 1978), philanthropy expert, is his eldest granddaughter.

== Memory in Katowice and Silesia ==
Pr. J. Pieter's memory is honored in various locations in Katowice and Silesia.

A roundabout bears his name in the vicinity of the University of Silesia. At the University of Silesia in Katowice, a memorial plaque is located on the front of the Institute of Chemistry, ul. Szolna 9, while his bust sits at the entrance of the hall that bears his name in the Department of Pedagogy and Psychology. Both are works by Silesian sculptor Zygmunt Brachmański.

In Skoczów, a sculpture by Jerzy Fober was inaugurated in 2016. In his native Ochaby, stands another bust by Zygmunt Brachmański.

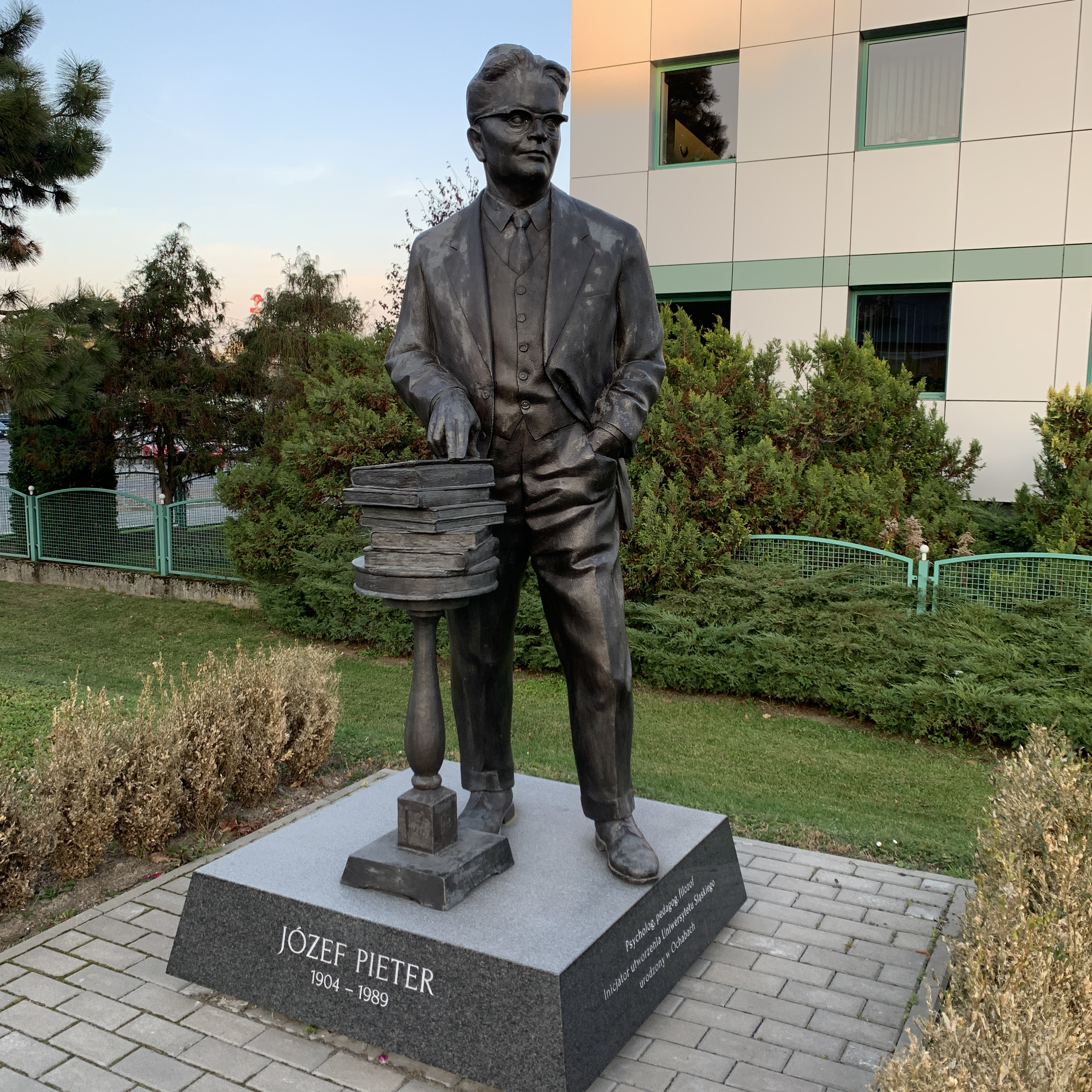
Pr. J. Pieter memorial in Skoczów

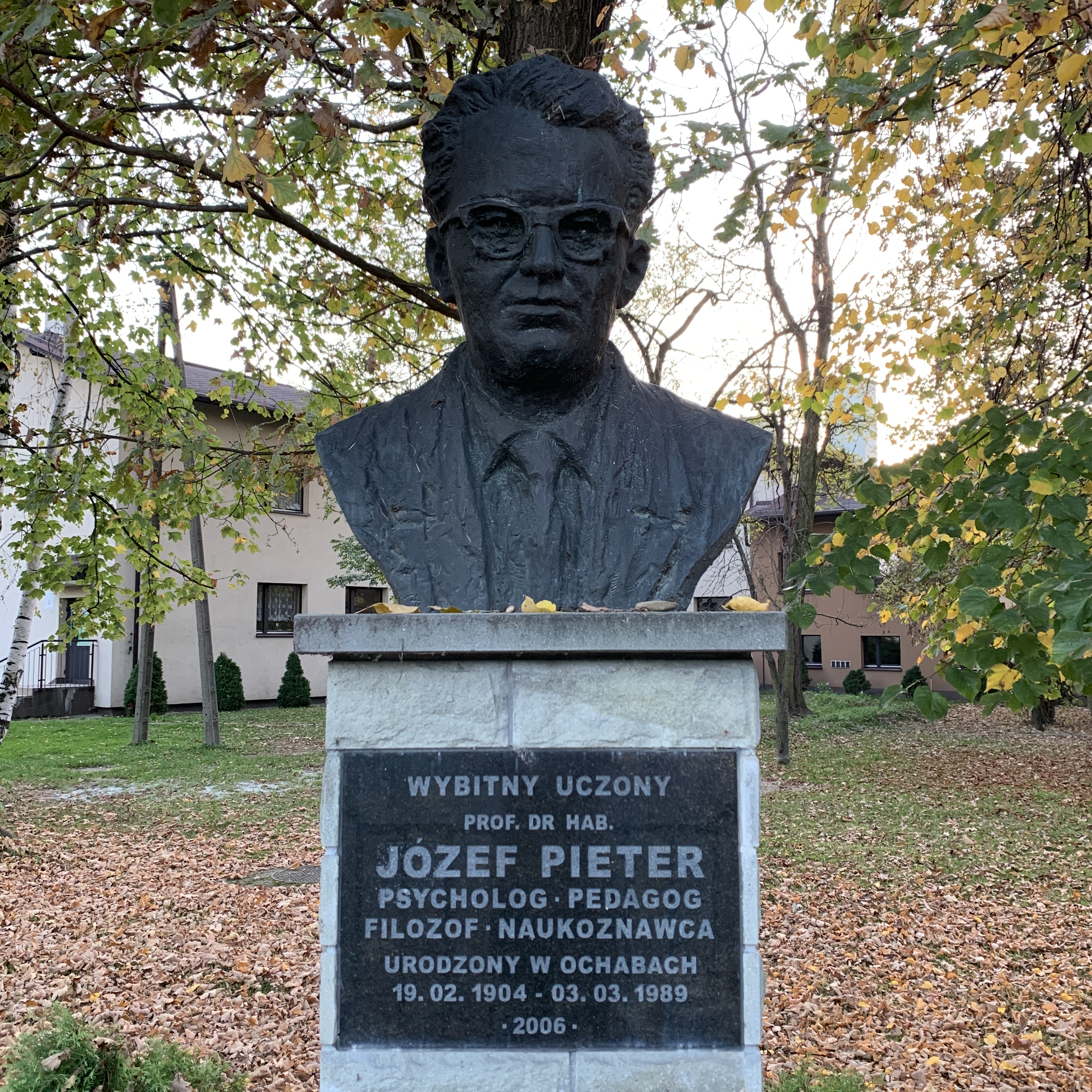
Pr. J. Pieter Bust in Ochaby (sculptor Zygmunt Brachmanski)

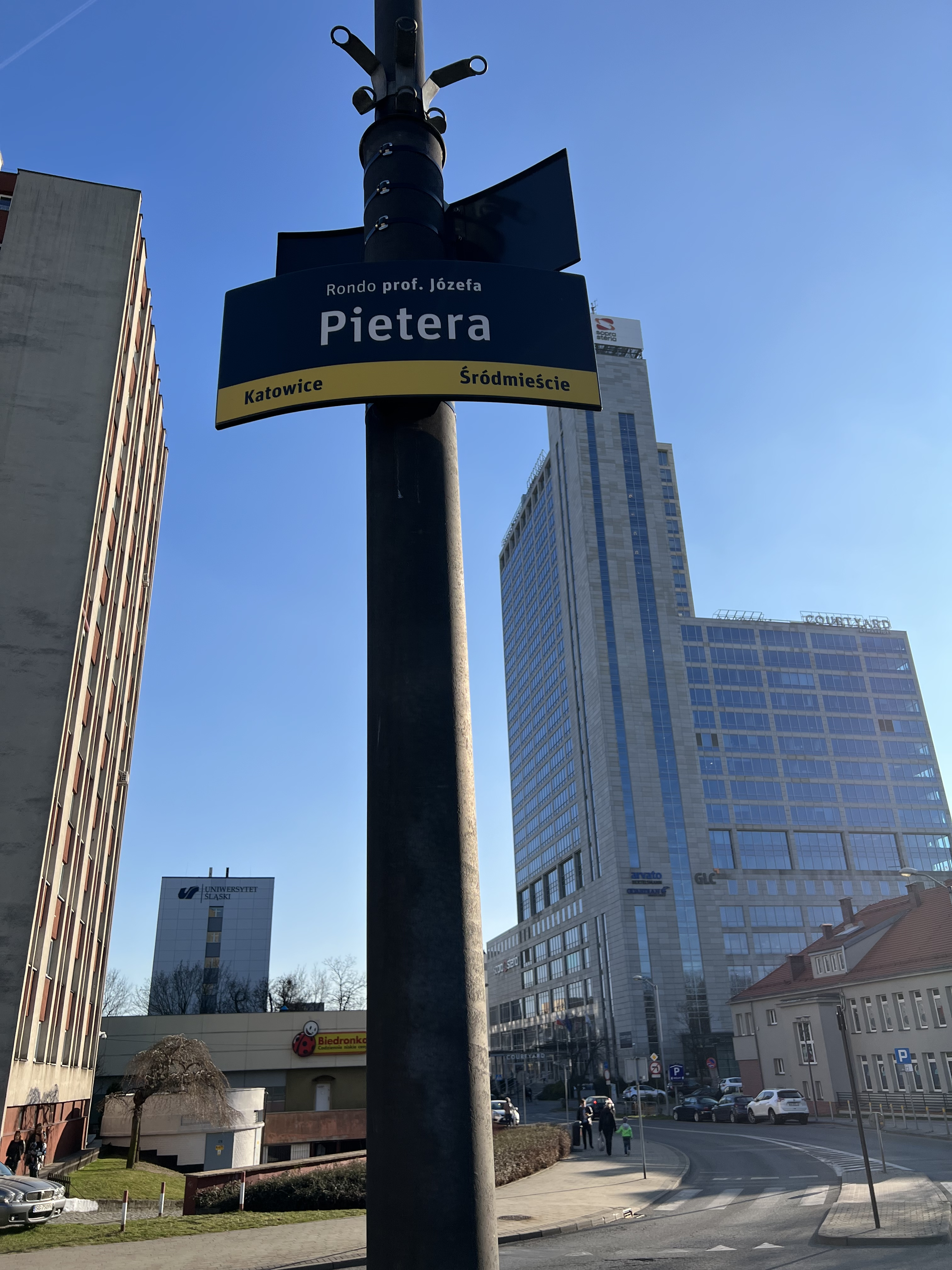
Pr. J. Pieter Roundabout in Katowice

In 2011, his son, Jacek Pieter, set up in Katowice a not-for-profit foundation in recognition of his father's intellectual legacy and engagements. It seeks to promote freedom of thought and creation through education centered on the pleasure of learning.

== Books ==
- Psychologia światopoglądu młodzieży (1933)
- Biografia ogólna (1946)
- Psychologia jako nauka (1947)
- Krytyka dzieł twórczych (1948)
- Historia psychologii (1958−1974)
- Czytanie i lektura (1960)
- Słownik psychologiczny (1963)
- Wstęp do nauki o osobowości (1969)
- Ogólna metodologia pracy naukowej (1967)
- Psychologia uczenia się i nauczania (1970)
