= Katarzyna Tubylewicz =

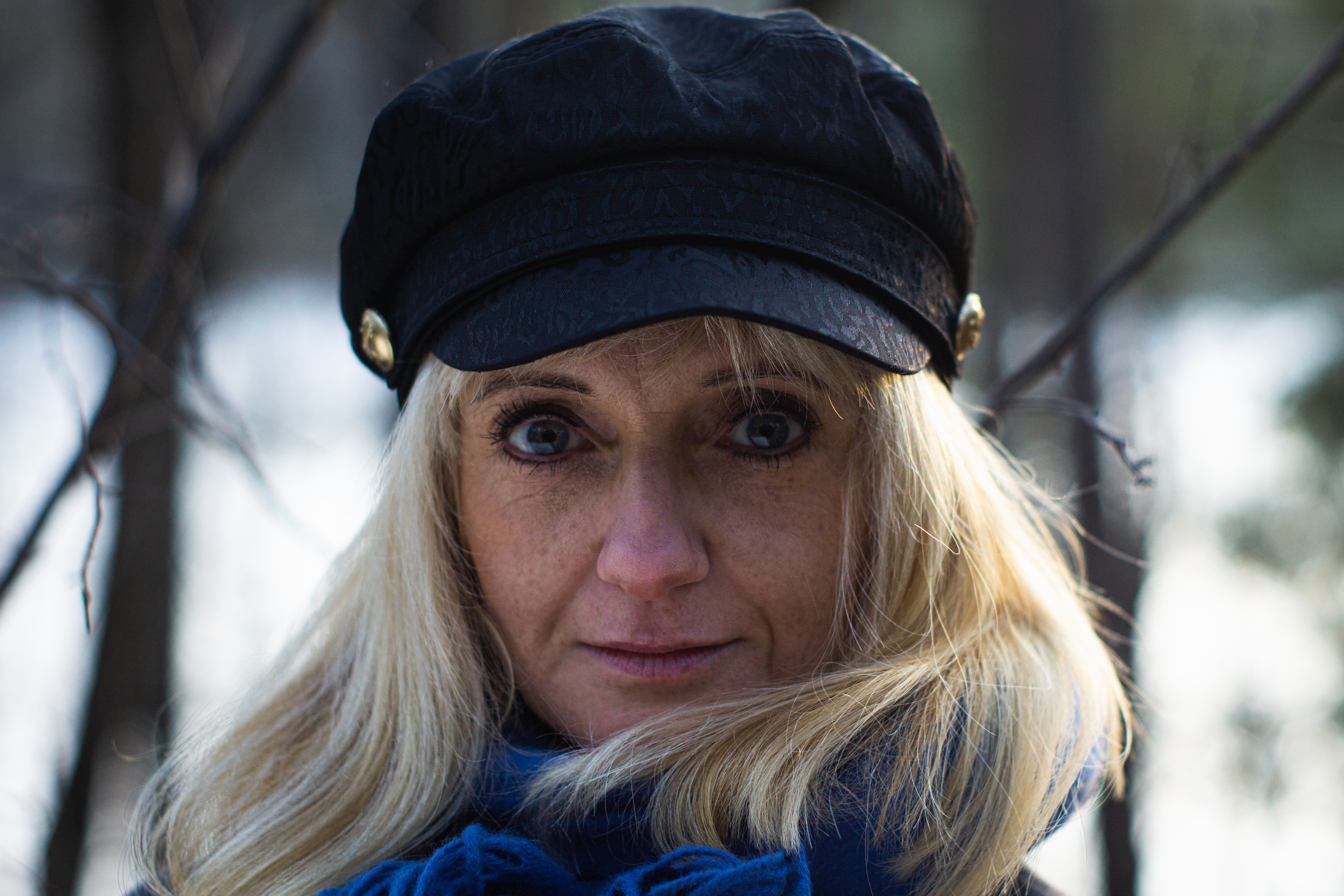
- Born: 26 August 1974 (age 52); Warsaw, Poland
- Education: University of Warsaw
- Occupations: Writer, translator, journalist

Katarzyna Tubylewicz (born 26 August 1974 in Warsaw) is a Polish writer, translator, and a journalist based in Stockholm, Sweden.

== Career ==
Tubylewicz graduated from the University of Warsaw's faculty of American Studies with a Masters in Cultural Studies, and has studied Polish Studies at University of Warsaw, Swedish Studies at the Stockholm University and Literary Translation at Södertörns högskola. Between 2006 and 2012, she was the director of the Polish Institute in Stockholm and the cultural attaché at the Polish Embassy in Sweden. She has taught Polish Studies at the University of Stockholm and translation studies at the University of Uppsala. In 2013, she was the programme director of the first edition of the Gdańsk Meetings of Literary Translators Found in Translation / Odnalezione w Tłumaczeniu.

Tubylewicz has written numerous essays and novels, and is the translator of several books from Swedish into Polish. As a journalist, she regularly contributes to Gazeta Wyborcza, TokFm Radio and Krytyka Polityczna.

== Personal life ==
Tubylewicz is married and has one son. She is also a professional yoga teacher. She lives in Stockholm.

== Works ==
Journalism, nonfiction

- Stockholm. A Capital City Humming With Silence, Wielka Litera 2019
- Moralists. How Swedes Learn From Mistakes and Other Stories, Wielka Litera, 2017
- Sweden Reads. Poland Reads(co-author Agata Diduszko-Zyglewska) Wydawnictwo Krytyki Politycznej, 2015
- I Am a Mum, Wydawnictwo Znak, 2004 (antologin av texter, urval och ed. Katarzyna Tubylewicz)
- A Swedish Sort of Solitude? Of the people of the North who enjoy being alone, Wielka Litera, February 2021

Novels

- A Very Cold Spring, Wydawnictwo WAB, 2020
- Marcel And His Last Novel, Wielka Litera, 2016
- The Last Of Friends, Wydawnictwo, WAB, 2013
- Personal Places, Jacek Santorski, 2005

Translations

- Majgull Axelsson, Dom Augusty (Slumpvandring), Wydawnictwo WAB, 2006
- Majgull Axelsson, Ta, którą nigdy nie byłam (Den jag aldrig var) Wydawnictwo WAB, 2008
- Maciej Zaremba, Polski hydraulik i inne opowieści ze Szwecji (Polsk rörmokare), Wydawnictwo Czarne 2008 (co-translators: Wojciech Chudoba, Jan Rost, Anna Topczewska)
- Majgull Axelsson, Lód i woda, woda i lód (Is och vatten, vatten och is) Wydawnictwo WAB, 2010
- Majgull Axelsson, Pępowina (Moderspassion), Wydawnictwo WAB, 2011
- Jonas Gardell, Nigdy nie ocieraj łez bez rękawiczek (Tårka aldrig tårar utan handskar), Wydawnictwo WAB, 2012
- Niklas Orrenius, Strzały w Kopenhadze (sv. Skotten i Köpenhamn), Wydawnictwo Poznańskie 2018
- Kjell Westö, Niebo o barwie siarki (sv. Den svavelgula himlen) Wydawnictwo Poznańskie, 2021

== Awards and Prizes ==
- Golden Polonia Owl Prize for helping promote Polish culture abroad (2018)
- Shortlisted for The Ryszard Kapuściński Prize in the Translator Prize Category (2019) for her translation of Shootings in Copenhagen by Niklas Orrenius.
- Moralists. How Swedes Learn From Mistakes and Other Stories was included on the list of the top five pieces of journalism to be published in Poland in 2017 by the editors of Tygodnik Powszechny
