= Geoffrey Beale =

British geneticist (1913–2009)

Professor Geoffrey Beale MBE FRS FRSE

Royal Society Research Professor, University of Edinburgh
- In office 1963–1978

Personal details
- Born: Geoffrey Herbert Beale; 11 June 1913 Wandsworth, London, England
- Died: 16 October 2009 (aged 96)
- Occupation: Geneticist

Geoffrey Herbert Beale (11 June 1913 – 16 October 2009) was a British geneticist. He founded the Protozoan Genetics Unit, at University of Edinburgh.

== Life ==
He grew up in Wandsworth, London, and attended Sutton Grammar School. Influenced by The Science of Life edited by H. G. Wells, he took life sciences as a direction. He earned a first-class honours degree, from Imperial College London, in 1935, and PhD in 1938. He worked at the John Innes Institute, with J. B. S. Haldane.

In World War II, he served in the Intelligence Corps, at the British mission to Murmansk. He worked at Cold Spring Harbor Laboratory.

== Family ==
He married Betty; they had three sons (Andrew, Stephen and Duncan).
