= Marian Dąbrowski =

Polish journalist, entrepreneur and publisher

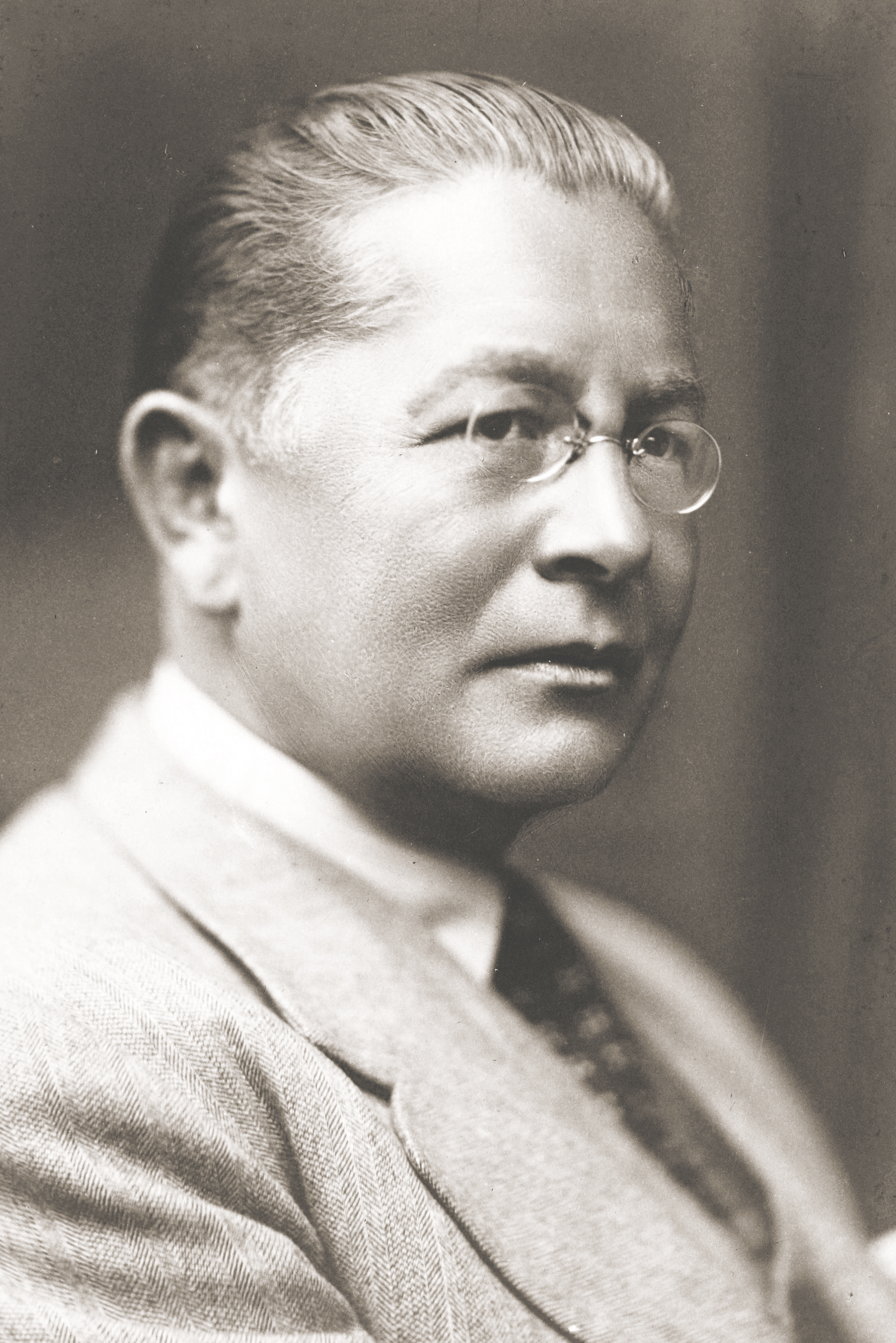
- Born: 27 September 1878; Mielec, Austro Hungary
- Died: 27 September 1958 (aged 80); Miami, United States
- Resting place: Rakowicki Cemetery
- Education: Jagiellonian University
- Occupations: Journalist; politician; activist
- Political party: Nonpartisan Bloc for Cooperation with the Government
- Other political affiliations: Polish People's Party "Piast"
- Awards: Order of the Crown of Italy; Order of the Crown of Romania; Order of St. Sava; Order of Merit of the Kingdom of Hungary

Marian Dąbrowski (27 September 1878 – 27 September 1958) was a Polish journalist, entrepreneur and publisher, the biggest and the most influential press magnate of the Second Polish Republic.

== Life and career ==
Dąbrowski was born on 27 September 1878 in Mielec. Between 1903 and 1907, he studied Polish philology at the Jagiellonian University in Kraków. Then he took up the job of a teacher, but quit and began working as a secretary of the Ilustracja Polska magazine. In 1908 he became a journalist in the Glos Narodu magazine, two years later he founded his own newspaper, Ilustrowany Kurier Codzienny (Illustrated Daily Courier). The first issue of the IKC was printed on 18 December 1910; after a few years its circulation grew to 180,000.

In 1918, after World War I, Dabrowski started creating his own press empire, opening offices in several locations of the interbellum Poland. In 1927 he purchased the Nowa Reforma magazine and moved his business to a lavish building called Palac Prasy (Palace of the Press), located at 1 Wielopole Street in Kraków. In 1932 his company was worth some $1.5 mln, he employed around 1400 people and published 5 titles, including the flagship, Ilustrowany Kurier Codzienny.

Between 1921 and 1935 Dabrowski was member of the Polish Parliament, as a member of the Polish People's Party "Piast" (PSL Piast) and later, the Nonpartisan Bloc for Cooperation with the Government (BBWR). Since 1926 he supported the Sanacja, also was alderman of the city of Kraków. Dabrowski often helped those in need, he funded prizes for young painters, also financially supported construction of a new building of the National Museum of Poland. He came up with the idea of opening the Bagatela Theatre, also sponsored field works around the Krakus Mound.

For many years, Dabrowski was a member of Kraków's Association of Friends of Fine Arts, between 1935 and 1939 he was the director of this organization. He supported development of sports, organizing various competitions. Also, he popularized the Tatra Mountains, for which he was named honorary citizen of Zakopane.

== Death ==
Just before World War II, Dabrowski left Poland for France. The war turned out a catastrophe for his business. His savings quickly dried out, and he moved to Florida, where lived in poverty, forgotten and destitute. He died on 27 September 1958 in Miami on the day of his 80th birthday, after several years urn with his ashes was brought to Kraków and buried at the Rakowicki Cemetery.

== See also ==
- List of Jagiellonian University people
