= Ilustrowany Kuryer Codzienny =

Daily newspaper in Kraków, Poland (1910-39)

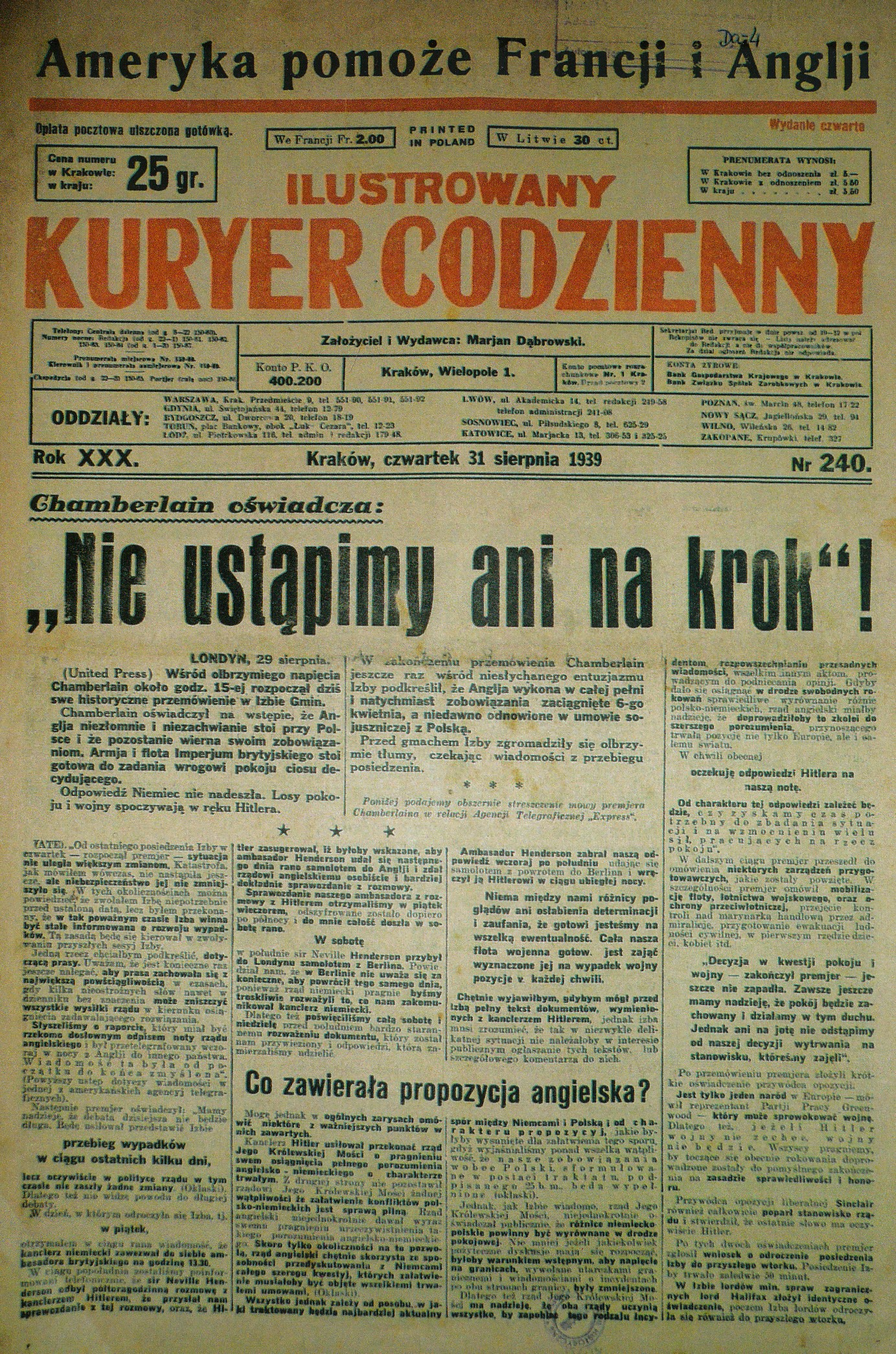
- August 31st issue of the newspaper
- Type: Daily newspaper
- Format: Compact
- Publisher: Ilustrowany Kuryer Codzienny
- Editor-in-chief: Marian Dąbrowski
- Founded: 19 December 1910; 115 years ago
- Ceased publication: October 26, 1939; 86 years ago
- Language: Polish
- Headquarters: Kraków
- Country: Poland
- Circulation: 250,000
- OCLC number: 214102137

Ilustrowany Kuryer Codzienny (Polish pronunciation: [ilustrɔˈvanɨ ˈkurjɛr t͡sɔˈd͡ʑɛnnɨ], Illustrated Daily Courier), abbreviated IKC or Ikac was a high-circulation daily newspaper focused on political and news, published in Kraków from 1910 to 1939. As the first national daily in Poland, it was launched by the Ilustrowany Kuryer Codzienny publishing group. Leading Polish journalists, publicists, and prominent figures from the worlds of culture and science regularly contributed to the newspaper.

The first issue appeared in December, 19th, 1910. The periodical featured several supplements, including Kurier Literacko-Naukowy (Literary-Scientific Courier), published from 1924 to 1939, and Kurier Kobiecy (Women’s Courier), published from 1927 to 1939.

Ilustrowany Kuryer Codzienny was the only Polish newspaper available daily across Europe; it had offices in main Polish cities (Warsaw, Poznań, Katowice, Wilno, Lwów, Gdynia) as well as several European capitals. During World War I its circulation was 125,000 and it was limited to the area of Austrian Galicia. In the 1920s, IKC grew, becoming Poland's most popular daily, read by some 1 million people.

Publication of the Illustrated Daily Courier was halted by the outbreak of World War II. Its final issue appeared on October 26, 1939. The following day, issue No. 1 of two occupation-sanctioned newspapers began: Krakauer Zeitung and Goniec Krakowski. The newspaper never resumed after the war.

Between 2011 and 2013, all issues of from 1910 to 1939 were digitized. The Małopolska Biblioteka Cyfrowa now offers a full-text electronic archive of the newspaper, while the National Digital Archives holds a collection of over 188,000 photographs from the publication.
