= Three Sisters Point =

Three Sisters Point (62°4′S 57°53′W) is a point marked by three conspicuous boulders, forming the west side of the entrance to Sherratt Bay on the south coast of King George Island, in the South Shetland Islands. Charted and named during 1937 by DI personnel on the Discovery II.
