= Andrzej Dunajewski =

Polish zoologist and ornithologist

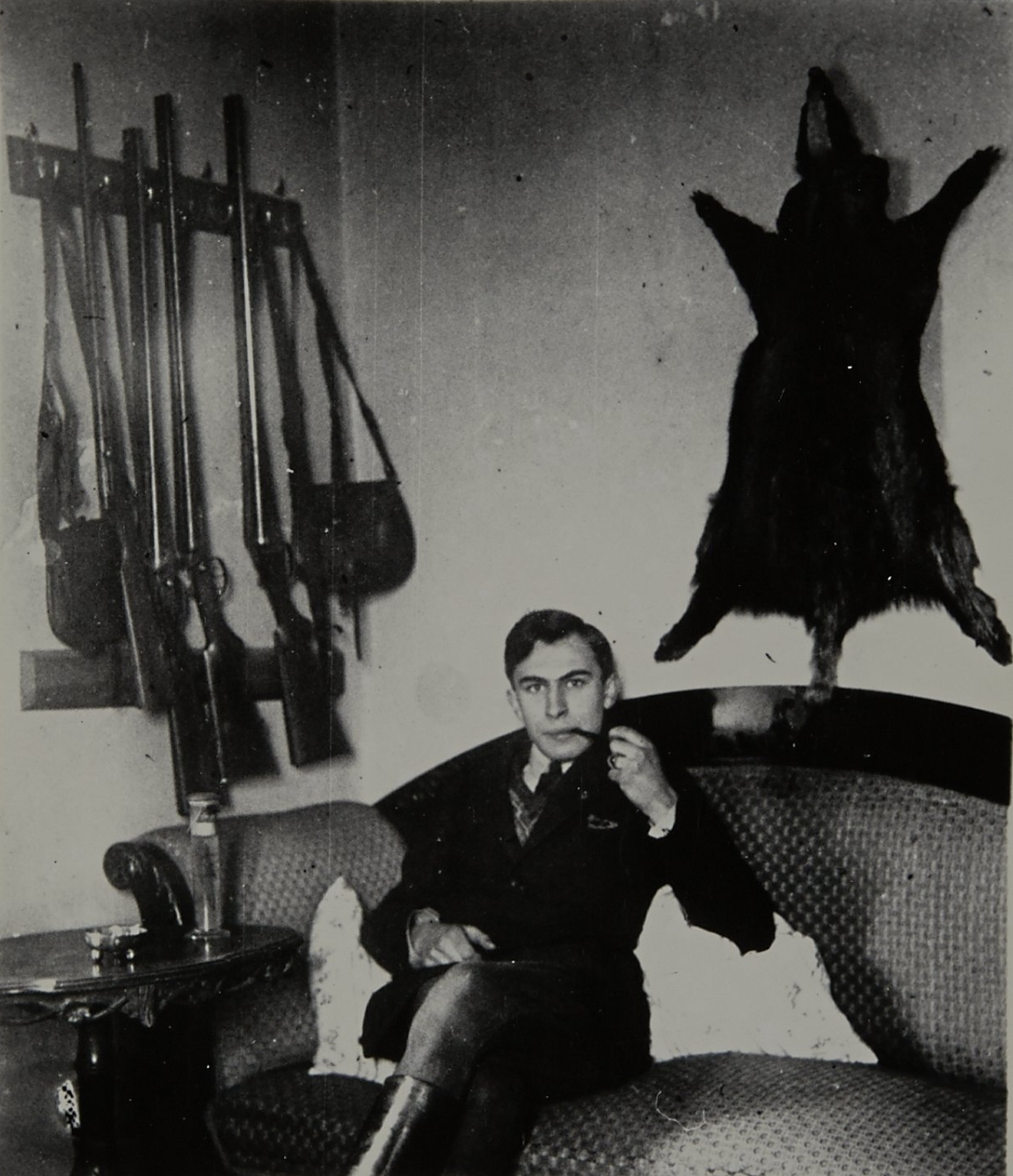

Andrzej Stanisław Julian Dunajewski (in German literature known as Andreas Dunajewski) (August 3, 1908, Wola Justowska – August 1944 ) was a Polish zoologist and ornithologist.

== Life and career ==
Born in Wola Justowska to Stanisław Dunajewski and Zofia from Madeyski, Andreas went to school in Vienna where his father worked before moving to Poland, graduated from the Junior High School and went on to study in Kraków at the Faculty of Philosophy of the Jagiellonian University. His master's thesis work was conducted under the guidance of Prof. Henryk Hoyer and was on lymphatic vessels. One of his findings was the suggestion that the caudal heart of fish pumped lymph, a theory that is no longer considered valid. He worked in the national zoological museum as an assistant to Janusz Domaniewski from 1933 to 1939 and worked briefly in Berlin with Prof. Erwin Stresemann. He received a doctorate from the University of Warsaw but joined the resistance during the war and fought in the Warsaw Uprising and died, possibly in a chemical attack, along with his wife and daughter in the Old Town.

His work was mainly on bird taxonomy and on bird research in Wołyń and Czarnohora, and near Włoszczowa.

- Dunajewski, A. (1948). New races of the Brown Owl, Hedge-Sparrow and a new species of Attila; also a new genus of Cotingidae. Bulletin of the British Ornithologists' Club, 68:130-132. (Posthumously published where the genus Akletos is established)
- Dunajewski, Andrzej (1939). "Gliederung und Verbreitung des Formenkreises Lanius schach L". Journal für Ornithologie. 87: 28–53. Bibcode:1939JOrn...87...28D. doi:10.1007/BF01950811. S2CID 36528094.
- Dunajewski, A. (1936) Materialien zur Verbreitung des Fishreihers (Ardea cinerea cinerea Linn.) in Polen. Acta Ornithologica Musei Zoologici Polonici 1(15):1-38.
- Dunajewski, A. (1936) Materialien zum Vorkomen des Schwarzstorches (Ciconia nigra Linn.) in Polen. Acta Ornithologica Musei Zoologici Polonici 2(1):1-25.
- Dunajewski, A. (1934) Die einheimischen Formen der Familie Turdidae. Acta Ornithologica Musei Zoologici Polonici 1(9):275-298.
- Dunajewski, A. (1931) Verzeichnis der im Quellengebeit der Flusse Nida und Pilica (Kreis Wloszczowa) beohachteten Vogel. Fragmenta Faunistica Musei Zoologici Polonici 1(14):372-386.
- Dunajewski, A. (1930) Die Lymphgefüsse im Rumpfe des Aales (Anguilla Anguilla L.). Bull. int Acad. pol. Sci. Lett. Ser. B. II. pp. 467–478.

== See also ==
- List of Jagiellonian University people
