= List of Polish United Workers' Party members =

Polish United Workers' Party logo

A list of notable Polish politicians and members of the defunct Polish United Workers' Party (Polish: Polska Zjednoczona Partia Robotnicza - PZPR).

== A ==
- Janina Abramowska
- Jerzy Adamski
- Norbert Aleksiewicz
- Nina Assorodobraj-Kula

== B ==
- Jan Baszkiewicz
- Marek Borowski
- Kazimierz Brandys
- Roman Bratny
- Andrzej Braun
- Kazimierz Buchała

== C ==
- Bronisław Cieślak
- Włodzimierz Cimoszewicz

== D ==
- Zbigniew Doda

== E ==
- Stanisław Ehrlich

== F ==
- Bolesław Faron
- Feliksa Fornalska

== G ==
- Natalia Gąsiorowska

== H ==
- Danuta Hübner

== J ==
- Michał Jagiełło
- Mieczysław Jastrun

== K ==
- Ryszard Kalisz
- Henryk Kluba
- Marian Konieczny
- Leszek Kołakowski
- Stanisław Kopera
- Żanna Kormanowa
- Włodzimierz Tadeusz Kowalski
- Leon Kruczkowski
- Hieronim Kubiak
- Aleksander Kwaśniewski

== L ==
- Stanisław Leszczycki

== M ==
- Jacek Majchrowski
- Andrzej Mandalian
- Mirosław Mossakowski

== N ==
- Tomasz Nałęcz
- Zbigniew Nienacki

== O ==
- Kazimierz Opałek

== P ==
- Kazimierz Pasenkiewicz
- Adam Polewka
- Bohdan Poręba

== R ==
- Dariusz Rosati
- Janusz Rybakowski
- Włodzimierz Rydzewski

== S ==
- Joanna Senyszyn
- Zbigniew Siemiątkowski
- Marek Siwiec

== T ==
- Jerzy Trela

== U ==
- Jerzy Urban

== W ==
- Danuta Waniek
- Zofia Wasilkowska
- Jan Wasilkowski
- Andrzej Werblan
- Jan Woleński
- Stanisław Wohl
- Mieczysław Wilczek
- Witold Wirpsza
- Wiktor Woroszylski

== Z ==
- Sylwester Zawadzki
- Wiesława Ziółkowska
