= Working People's Movement =

Polish political party

Working People's Movement Ruch Ludzi Pracy
- Alternative name: Movement for the Working People; Movement of Polish Working People
- Abbreviation: RLP
- Leader: Roman Broszkiewicz (1991-1992); Alfred Miodowicz (1992-1995); Wit Majewski (1995); Lech Szymańczyk (since 1995)
- Founder: Alfred Miodowicz
- Founded: 10 October 1989 (originally) (Note: It is uncertain whether it was dissolved as a political party or not; the last time the party was mentioned by the National Electoral Commission was on 2 June 2003. According to Polityka, the RLP had retired from independent political activity by 2005. According to Mateusz Piskorski, the Working People's Movement never stopped existing, but it "eventually developed into a loose association" after leaving SLD in 1999. The 2007 edition of the Political Handbook of Europe listed the party as still existing. The party also was involved in the 2009 European Parliament election in Poland.); 26 May 2012 (reactivation)
- Registered: 18 January 1991
- Headquarters: Mikołaja Kopernika 36/40, 00-328 Warsaw
- Membership (1991): 200,000
- Ideology: Democratic socialism Labour movement Catholic left Left-wing populism
- Political position: Left-wing to far-left
- National affiliation: All-Poland Alliance of Trade Unions; Democratic Left Alliance; Self-Defence of the Republic of Poland
- Colors: Red
- Slogan: Work, ownership, self-governance (Polish: Praca, własność, samorządność)

The Working People's Movement (Polish: Ruch Ludzi Pracy, RLP), also known as the Movement for the Working People, or the Movement of Polish Working People, is a left-wing political party and trade union in Poland. It was founded on 10 October 1989 by trade unionists of All-Poland Alliance of Trade Unions (OPZZ) to serve as the political wing of OPZZ. Initially founded as a "political front", it became a political party on 16 December 1990 and was registered on 18 January 1991. It became one of the 30 founding organizations of the Democratic Left Alliance (SLD) in 1991, and from 1991 to 2001, RLP held 11 seats in the Sejm as part of SLD. In 1999, the RLP broke away from SLD because it opposed the decision of the SLD to transform from a coalition to a centralized political party, as it wanted to maintain its identity. From 1999 to 2000, the party's MPs formed a parliamentary group together with the Polish Socialist Party, but this was dissolved in 2000 over policy disagreements. The RLP did not participate in the 2001 election and thus lost its 11 seats. It then became a loose political association, and its members joined the far-left Self-Defence of the Republic of Poland. RLP campaigned for the leader of Self-Defence, Andrzej Lepper, in the 2005 presidential election, and ran on its electoral lists in the 2005 and 2007 parliamentary elections, with Szymański, the leader of the RLP, winning a seat in 2005. The RLP was reactivated on 26 May 2012.

The party is a part of the Polish post-communist radical left. Its goal is to "protect the working people and their material, political and social interests". The ideology of the Working People's Movement mixes many currents - it is a union of left-wing trade unions, makes populist appeals based on public discontent towards the Balcerowicz Plan and reality of capitalist Poland, and considers itself a part of the left-wing tradition of the Catholic Church, which is expressed by elements of Catholic moralism in the party. On one hand, the Working People's Movement seeks to take over the legacy of the fallen ruling communist party, the Polish United Workers' Party, but on the other hand it denounces it as "a workers' party in name only". The RLP presents a democratic socialist vision, calling for a socialization and parcellization of the Polish economy into four unique portions - 20% is to be owned by the state and follow state socialist principles, another 20% is to form the "communal sector" based on workers' cooperatives, 40% is to be given to a "public sector" based on "stock cooperatives" where both the owners and the workers would own a fixed share in stocks, and the remaining 20% is to comprise a private sector of small businesses only.

== History ==
=== Foundation ===
The Working People's Movement was created by Alfred Miodowicz, who protested against the decisions of the party leadership of Polish United Workers' Party, and who during the 2nd part of the 13th meeting of the Central Committee, 29 July 1989, resigned from the membership of the Political Bureau of the Central Committee of the Polish United Workers‘ Party. Miodowicz envisaged the emergence of his own party as the Polish United Workers’ Party did not meet his expectations. He declared to defend the working people, ‘their material, political and social interests’. He represented the party faction of Adam Schaff, an anti-globalist communist theorist who was removed from the Polish United Workers' Party in 1984 but briefly reinstated in 1989.

Alfred Miodowicz was heavily critical of the Polish communist authorities in the late 1980s, calling the economic program implemented by it a failure and fundamentally flawed. Miodowicz was outspoken on his criticism of the state of the Polish economy and the living conditions of the society. However, he advocated evolutionary changes to eliminate ‘anarchy’, arguing that the West was interested in the destruction of Poland and would only support it if Solidarność was legalised, which would revive the fighting spirit - he stated: ‘I am convinced that we will only receive support when we are at each other's throats, when we repeat the lesson from Lebanon’. This also led him to oppose the re-legalization of Solidarność.

The decision to establish a group that would politically represent the All-Poland Alliance of Trade Unions, a trade union headquarters controlled by the Polish United Workers' Party union headquarters, was taken in autumn 1989. On 10 October 1989, Alfred Miodowicz organized trade union activists of various left-wing organizations and founded the party. RLP was initially supposed to be a political wing of the All-Poland Alliance of Trade Unions, but throughout 1990 it was reformed into a wider socio-political movement of left-wing trade unions.

=== Early activities ===
On 30 November, the representatives of the Working People's Movement together with Wojciech Wiśniewski, a member of the executive committee of OPZZ, met with the steelworkers, where they discussed the expected increases in various articles from 1 January, related to the increase in the price of coal; these were of particular concern to the workers. In its statements, RLP was to bring together representatives of the political left, including members of the Polish United Workers' Party, but it was not ruled out that "our social movement will be forced to transform into an independent political organisation." The founding congress of the party then took place on 16 December 1990, and entry into the register of political parties was obtained on 18 January 1991.

The party's organization was formulated to reflect that of a trade union - from 19 November 1989 until 16 December 1990, it was led by a Coordination Council with Ewa Spychalska as the chairwoman and Paweł Gieorgica as the secretary. At the founding congress, the Coordination Council was replaced by the National Assembly of Delegates as the supreme authority of the party, and another body, the National Council, was created to de facto rule the party between the sessions of the National Assembly of Delegates. The National Council had 65 members, and each left-wing organization joining the party was guaranteed to receive at least a single seat.

The RLP was temporarily headed by professor Roman Broszkiewicz, who was replaced a year later by the long-time chairman of the All-Poland Alliance of Trade Unions, Alfred Miodowicz. In 1995, the party was headed for several months by Member of Parliament Wit Majewski and, from the autumn of the same year, by Lech Szymańczyk. The organisers also included a group of academics from the Academy of Social Sciences, which was affiliated with the Central Committee of the Polish United Workers' Party. Adam Schaff, a communist activist and Marxist theoretician, became the ideological leader of the party. The party structures of the Working People's Movement became the remnants of the All-Poland Alliance of Trade Unions - this allowed to party to have 200,000 members in 1991.

=== Joining the SLD ===
In the 1990 Polish presidential election, RLP endorsed Włodzimierz Cimoszewicz of the Social Democracy of the Republic of Poland, calling him "a man whom the people of the left can unite around". The Working People's Movement became one of the founding members of the Democratic Left Alliance, which at that time was a coalition of around 30 parties, trade unions and associations. Support for a united left-wing political front was reflected in the Working People's Movement since the beginning, as in 1990 it declared: "We are in favour of a single strong, offensive left-wing party. Only such a party can effectively protect endangered livelihoods and the socialist idea of work." RLP candidates ran on SLD lists in the parliamentary elections in 1991, 1993 and 1997, winning several seats each time. In the Sejm of the Republic of Poland of the first three terms, the party was represented by Barbara Hyla-Makowska, Teresa Jasztal, Jacek Kasprzyk, Bogdan Krysiewicz, Janusz Lemański, Wit Majewski, Kazimierz Milner, Regina Pawłowska, Ewa Spychalska, Lech Szymańczyk and Jan Szymański. In the 1995 Polish presidential election, the Working People's Movement endorsed Aleksander Kwaśniewski of Social Democracy of the Republic of Poland, who was supported by the majority of the SLD; however, some left-wing parties at the time, such as the National Party of Retirees and Pensioners and Polish People's Party, did not endorse Kwaśniewski. RLP then signed a joint SLD declaration urging for further support for Kwaśniewski.

=== Break with SLD ===
RLP was re-registered in 1998 in accordance with the new Political Parties Act. A year later, its authorities opposed the party's accession to the unified formation being created on the basis of the Democratic Left Alliance, which sought to become a single, centralized political party rather than a loose coalition than it has hitherto been. The Working People's Movement argued that it wanted to retain its own political identity. RLP also criticized the decision of the All-Poland Alliance of Trade Unions to join Democratic Left Alliance, stressing that RLP itself came from it. As a consequence, Lech Szymańczyk and Kazimierz Milner left the parliamentary club of the Democratic Left Alliance, co-founding a new parliamentary group together with representatives of the Polish Socialist Party. Polish Socialist Party and the RLP were both amongst the parties that opposed the reformation of the Democratic Left Alliance. On 31 March 1999, RLP instead entered talks with Labour Union to formulate a common program and political front, and both parties signed a cooperation agreement on 23 July, where both parties were to represent the "interests of the working class". On 30 September 1999, RLP then signed another agreement with the Polish Socialist Party and the National Party of Retirees and Pensioners.

Despite officially breaking with the Democratic Left Alliance, the RLP remained somewhat cordial to it in the Sejm. It held a vote through which it attempted to make Stefan Niesiołowski responsible for his insults towards Democratic Left Alliance officials; Niesiołowski called Ryszard Kalisz "pornominister", and Aleksander Kwaśniewski "pornopresident". The Working People's Movement also voted in favor of the failed motion to ban "soft" pornography. However, in 2000, the parliamentary group broke apart because RLP opposed the way the leader of the Polish Socialist Party, Piotr Ikonowicz, voted on issues. In May 2000, together with the Polish People's Party, Democratic Left Alliance and the Polish Socialist Party, the Working People's Movement spoke in favor of a referendum on privatization of national forests. The calls for a referendum came after a report revealed that privatization of institutions related to forest preservation to severe negligence; a petition for a referendum on this matter was signed by over 543 thousand citizens.

=== Alliance with Samoobrona ===
The Working People's Movement had not been represented in parliament since 2001, but it remained functioning as a trade union. It is uncertain whether it was dissolved as a political party or not; the last time the party was mentioned by the National Electoral Commission was on 2 June 2003. According to Polityka, the RLP had retired from independent political activity by 2005. According to Mateusz Piskorski, the Working People's Movement never stopped existing, but it "eventually developed into a loose association" after leaving SLD in 1999. The party was reported as still existing in the 2007 edition of the Political Handbook of Europe, and remaining cloosely associated with the All-Poland Alliance of Trade Unions and Self-Defence of the Republic of Poland. The party also was involved in the 2009 European Parliament election in Poland.

=== Later activities ===
In the 2009 European Parliament election in Poland, the RLP spoke in support of Adam Gierek, co-founder of the Edward Gierek's Economic Revival Movement and a son of the former communist leader Edward Gierek. Adam Gierek sought to run in the election on the electoral list of Democratic Left Alliance – Labour Union in the Silesian Voivodeship; however, while Labour Union favoured Gierek to be put on the top of the list, local Democratic Left Alliance leaders wished to put him no higher than as the 3rd candidate on the list. Together with Edward Gierek's Economic Revival Movement, the Democratic Party of the Left and left-wing patriotic movements (all of which cooperated with Samoobrona just like RLP) spoke in favor of Gierek taking 1st place on the list. Eventually, Gierek was placed on the 2nd place, and successfully won a seat.

Some of the RLP's activists, led by Lech Szymańczyk, also joined Self-Defence of the Republic of Poland. In the 2000s, the ties of Democratic Left Alliance to trade unions and post-communist left gradually faded - this was despite the fact that both the Working People's Movement and the OPZZ were amongst the 30 organization that first founded the SLD in 1991. Trade unionists were gradually eliminated from the party lists - 54 of SLD MPs were nominated by the OPZZ in the 1993-1997 Sejm, 44 in the 1997-2001 Sejm, and only 10 in the 2007–2011 term. Democratic Left Alliance also became supported of market-liberal policies, which was criticized by Polish trade unions and provoked further split with the labor movement. In contrast, the Working People's Movement became closely associated with the far-left populist Self-Defence of the Republic of Poland - the leader of RLP, Lech Szymańczyk, forged very close relations with Samoobrona and became its member. Self-Defence called itself the "a true patriotic left" and the only left-wing party in the Sejm, denouncing other parties as liberal. It complemented RLP as the "renewed left". In the 2005 Polish presidential election, the party supported the campaign of Samoobrona's leader Andrzej Lepper, and Szymański was a member of Lepper's presidential electoral committee. Szymański then ran on the electoral lists of Samoobrona in the 2005 Polish parliamentary election, successfully winning a seat. RLP members then ran on the parliamentary lists of Samoobrona again in the 2007 Polish parliamentary election.

=== Revival ===
On 26 May 2012, a new organisation was founded under the name of the Working People's Movement, referring to the tradition of the political party RLP. Lech Szymańczyk became chairman, while Aldona Michalak, Bogdan Socha and Jacek Zdrojewski became vice-chairme. On 12 October 2013, the association co-founded the Social Agreement ‘Change’ (Polish: Porozumienie Społeczne „Zmiana”) together with Polish Left (led by Jacek Zdrojewski), Polish Socialist Party, Party of Regions and the Agricultural and Rural Trade Union ‘Regions’ (Polish: Związek Zawodowy Rolnictwa i Obszarów Wiejskich „Regiony”). The Polish Socialist Party was later replaced by the National Party of Retirees and Pensioners. The reformed Working People's Movement ran in the 2014 Polish local elections, but did not win any seats.

Prior to the 2018 Polish local elections, the RLP co-founded the SLD Lewica Razem coalition. In 2019, the association, together with Labour Union and the Polish Left criticised the SLD's participation in the European Coalition in the 2019 European Parliament election in Poland. In the 2020 Polish presidential election, RLP supported the Labour Union chairman Waldemar Witkowski. In the first round, Witkowski won 0.14% of the popular vote. In the second round, Witkowski consulted the parties that endorsed him, including the Working People's Movement, on a potential endorsement of either Andrzej Duda or Rafał Trzaskowski - the candidates of the second round. Ultimately, Witkowski declared that he will endorse neither of the candidates, and asked his supporters to vote for a candidate closer to his demands, which were: seven-hour working day, no taxes on salaries lower than 30,000 PLN, and free prescription drugs.

On 25 June 2022, the RLP signed (together with, among others, the PPS, UP, Social Democracy of Poland, Freedom and Equality, and the former Feminist Initiative party) cooperation agreement before the parliamentary elections, advocating for a ‘broad electoral agreement of the democratic opposition’. On 1 March 2024, the party's leader in 1995 and its MP from 1991 to 2001, Wit Majewski, died.

== Electoral results ==
=== Presidential ===
Election year	1st round			2nd round		
Election year	Candidate	# of overall votes	% of overall vote	Candidate	# of overall votes	% of overall vote
1990	Supported Włodzimierz Cimoszewicz	1,514,025	9.21 (#4)			
1995	Supported Aleksander Kwaśniewski	6,275,670	35.11 (#1)	Aleksander Kwaśniewski	9,704,439	51.72 (#1)
2005	Supported Andrzej Lepper	2,259,094	15.11 (#3)			
2020	Supported Waldemar Witkowski	27,290	0.14 (#10)			

=== Sejm ===
Election year	# of votes	% of vote	# of overall seats won	+/–
1991	1,344,820	11.99	11 / 460	▲11
1991	On behalf of the Democratic Left Alliance, which won 60 seats in total.			
1993	2,815,169	20.41	11 / 460	Steady
1993	On behalf of the Democratic Left Alliance, which won 171 seats in total.			
1997	3,551,224	27.13	11 / 460	Steady
1997	On behalf of the Democratic Left Alliance, which won 164 seats in total.			
2001	Did not participate		0 / 460	▼11
2005	1,347,355	11.41	1 / 460	▲1
2005	On behalf of the Self-Defence of the Republic of Poland, which won 56 seats in total.			
2007	247,335	1.53	0 / 460	▼1
2007	On behalf of the Self-Defence of the Republic of Poland, which won no seats.			

=== Regional assemblies ===
Election year	% of vote	# of overall seats won	+/–
2014	0.01	0 / 555	New
2018	6.62	0 / 552	Steady
2018	As part of the SLD Lewica Razem coalition.		

=== European Parliament ===
Election	Votes	%	Seats	+/–	EP Group
2009	Endorsed Adam Gierek (Democratic Left Alliance – Labour Union)				

== Ideology ==
In its first declaration from November 1989, the Working People's Movement described itself as a party created to "protect the working people and their material, political and social interests, and to guarantee their real ownership of national assets - as it is the working people that with their own labor created the wealth of the corporations, state, cities and counties." The party condemned the Balcerowicz Plan, arguing that while Leszek Balcerowicz and other anti-communist politicians condemned the People's Republic of Poland for its supposed elitism and bureaucracy, their economic reforms likewise would result in an elitist and bureaucratized economy. RLP stated that "capitalism is forced on the working class" and called for reforming state-owned industries into worker cooperatives rather than privatization. The party closely followed Balcerowicz's reforms and criticized his actions throughout the 1990s, often calling for alternative action such as introducing more state interventionism and restricting the forces of the market with state planning.

The party is considered populist. It accused the Polish United Workers' Party (PZPR) of no longer representing interests of working people, and it also denounced Solidarity, referred to as a ‘parasolidarity’. The movement made Adam Schaff, a communist who was removed from the PZPR in 1984, its ‘guru’ (his PZPR membership reinstated on 19 September 1989). RLP opposes the reprivatisation of the ‘assets of the entire nation’ and protests against the ‘unemployment capitalism’ of Poland, accusing it of causing dependence of the Polish economy on the West and the burdening of the ‘world of work’ with the costs of recovering from the crisis. According to the party, these costs should be borne ‘primarily by those who have made fortunes from the economic mess so far’. The party also postulated establishing a new political body, a ‘congress for working people’. A declaration of the party from 1992 was:

The Working People's Movement seeks out impoverished, unemployed, homeless people with no prospects in life. It fights for the trust of people who have been stripped of the illusion of being able to improve their own lot, people who do not know if they will still have a job tomorrow, if they will be able to afford medicine if they fall ill, if they will have enough money to pay the rent, buy fuel or the cheapest food. Someone has to stand up for the working people and the unemployed, since neither Solidarność nor the Social Democrats are doing it. The movement wants to stand up for them in the upcoming parliamentary elections. Working people cannot take it any more, they are insulted and lied to. An example of lies are the railway discounts for teachers. It is claimed that they were unlawfully granted by the communist regime and that teachers had them even before the war.

=== Goals ===
Initially, the RLP described itself as "not a party, but a front that can develop into a party". One of its aims is to take over the legacy of the Polish United Workers' Party. According to Polityka, the Working People's Movement was primarily formed by the "old guard" of the communist party. It has been described as left-wing and radical left; its main goals are representing the interest of the working class and fighting against problems such as unemployment, unequal and low wages, and the living conditions of pensioners and unemployed. Especially important for the party is the issue of capitalist transformation, which the party denounces and demands action against the wealthier layers of Polish society that benefited from capitalism at the cost of the workers. The slogan of the party is "work, ownership, self-governance" (Polish: praca, własność, samorządność).

Calling back to Schaff's concepts, the Working People's Movement declares that it is ‘based on the strengths of the broadly understood democratic left, reaching back to the progressive elements of the church's social policy. It does not reject cooperation with left-wing groups that express the frustration of larger social groups’. Catholic themes were also embraced by the OPZZ, which called for "national sovereignty, national culture, honor, Christian traditions". The adherence to Catholic moralism was also shown by the fact that in 2000, the Working People's Movement supported an unsuccessful motion to ban "soft" pornography, and condemned MPs for foul language. Through its populist rhetoric, the party also makes appeals to those disappointed with the consequences of socialist Poland collapsing, and impoverished by the new capitalist policies. The RLP wrote: ‘We expected a comprehensive, truly ‘ours’ programme that would inspire us all to implement it, to build our own dream Home, truly free, without poverty and evil. We trusted that the country would be ruled by people chosen by us, filled with concern for the welfare of all working people. But our hope has once again proven to be an illusion. Nobody is certain that the programme adopted by the current government will be successful. There is still a lot of talk about improving the lives of working people, but in reality, many of us are facing extreme poverty.’

=== Economic proposals ===
The Working People's Movement is also considered socialist. It makes calls to "protect endangered livelihoods and the socialist idea of work", and seeks to take over the legacy of the former ruling communist party. It has a communist past, and expresses both acceptance and support for the Polish socialism before the 1980s reforms undertaken by the reformist wing of the PZPR. It stresses the need to "democratise the political system and respect the interests of wage labourers, as well as to maintain, strengthen and expand historically hard-fought workers' rights" and is placed amongst the former socialist and trade unionist wings of the communist party. Despite its close ties and aspirations to represent the fallen PZPR, the RLP also embraced democratic socialist sentiments in its ideology. It argued: "PZPR is a worker's party in name only... Workers were exploited by the state apparatus for years." It argues that the goal for trade unions should not be to overthrow the government, but rather provoke a "leftward shift within the government" through protesting privatization and capitalist institutions. The party conditionally supports democracy, arguing that it would support a "pluralistic parliamentary system" as long as it would have the "function of redistributing both income and property". The party is critical of the Polish social democracy, stating: "Someone has to stand up for the working people and the unemployed, since neither Solidarność nor the Social Democrats are doing it."

The RLP presents a complex vision of Polish socialist economy, calling for "socialization of the state enterprises and their parcelling out". Polish corporations are to become "stock cooperatives" where "public owners", defined as local governments, cooperatives and trade unions would hold 60% of the stocks, and the workers 40%. The party also argues that Polish economy should be divided into four sectors. First sector is to be "state sector" comprising 20% of industrial production, and would include key industries that were to remain in the hands of the state. Second and third sectors would be the "communal sector" and "public sector" respectively; the communal sector would comprise another 20% of production forces and work through work communes, whereas the public sector is to include 40% of Poland's industrial power and be based on the "stock cooperatives" that the party advocates for. The fourth sector is to be the private sector and occupy the remaining 20% of the Polish industrial output; however, RLP stresses that the private sector should include small businesses only. In this way, the party calls for a socialist system that would be a mixture of state socialism, workers' self-management, market socialism based on stock exchange cooperatives, and lastly capitalism of small businesses.

== Bibliography ==
- Paszkiewicz, Krystyna (2004). Partie i koalicje polityczne III Rzeczypospolitej (in Polish). Wrocław: Wydawnictwo Uniwersytetu Wrocławskiego. pp. 130–131. ISBN 83-229-2493-3.
