= Polish Round Table Agreement =

1989 dialogue between the Polish government and banned trade unions

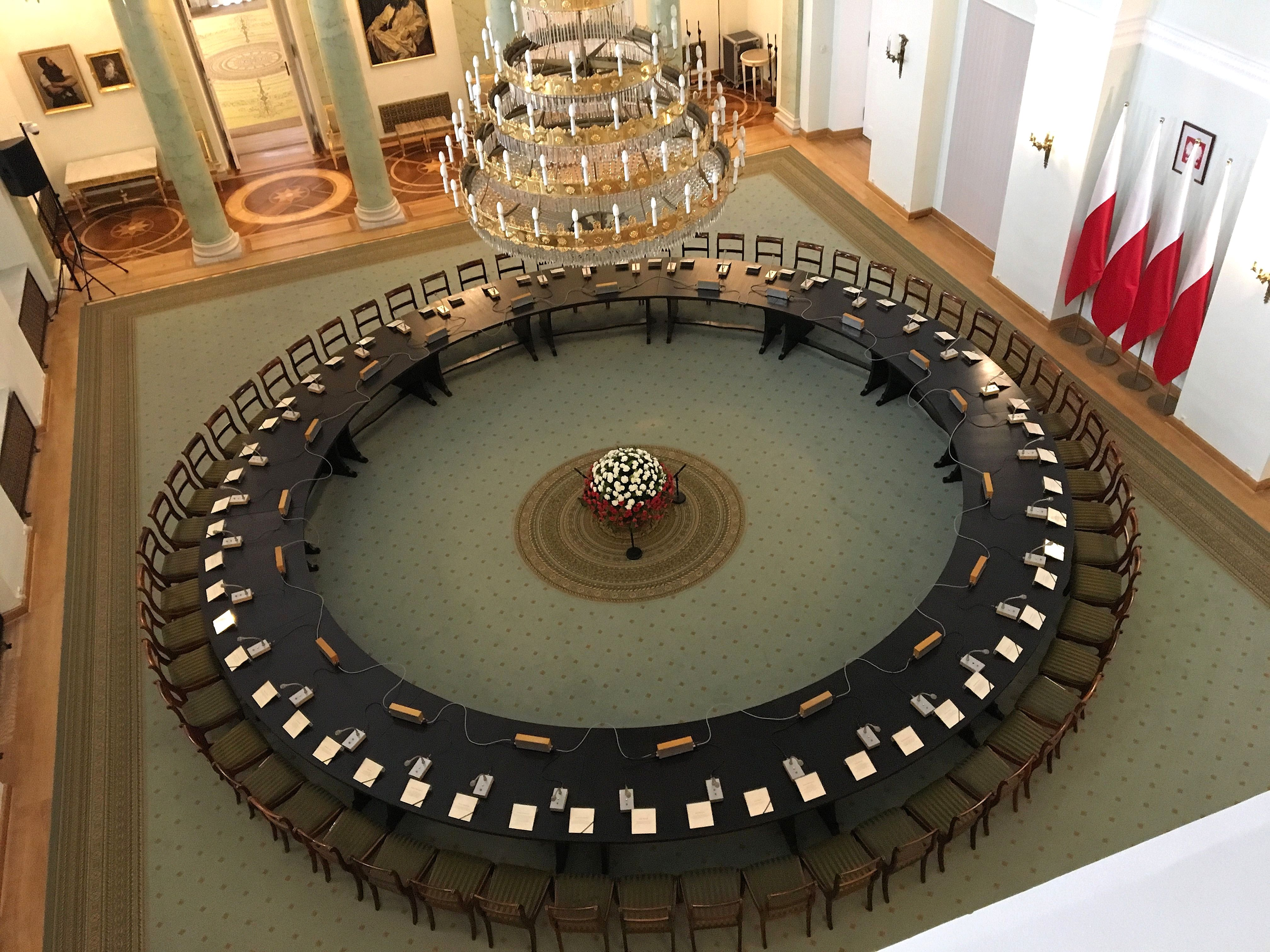
The table exhibited at its original location in the Column Hall of the Presidential Palace as part of the 30th anniversary commemorations, 2019

The Polish Round Table Talks took place in Warsaw, communist Poland, from 6 February to 5 April 1989. The government initiated talks with the banned trade union Solidarity and other opposition groups to defuse growing social unrest.

== History ==
Following the factory strikes of the early 1980s and the subsequent formation of the (then still underground) Solidarity movement under the leadership of Lech Wałęsa, the political situation in Poland started relaxing somewhat. Despite an attempt by the government to crack down on trade unionism, the movement had gained too much momentum, and it became impossible to hold off change any more. In August 1988, the Polish People's Republic authorities started a dialogue with the opposition under the influence of multiple internal and external factors. The main reasons were the many social protests, lasting from May 1988 in different regions of Poland, the increasing crisis of the Polish economy, the pressure of the Polish Catholic Church to begin negotiations with the opposition, support of the Western states for Solidarity, and simultaneous internal transformations of the USSR provoked by the politics of perestroika of Gorbachev, ultimately decided about initiating the talks. Also the changes in the attitude of both ruling party and the opposition were vital to the process; the contemporary authorities knew that they need social permission to conduct required economic reforms, and for that reason, they wanted to share the political responsibility with Solidarity, whereas the opposition prioritized the need to reorganize public life over continuation of resisting the Polish United Workers Party (PZPR).

In September 1988, when a wave of strikes was ending, a secret meeting was held, which included Lech Wałęsa and Minister of Internal Affairs Czesław Kiszczak. They agreed to hold the so-called "Round Table" talks in the near future to plan out the course of action to be undertaken in the country. The Round Table talks began on 6 February 1989 at 14:23 CET. They included the Solidarity opposition and the government (also referred to as the ruling coalition due to participation in the talks of PZPR's bloc parties, like United People's Party (ZSL), Alliance of Democrats (SD), and other PZPR-dependent organizations). The talks were held in the Council of Ministers Office. Wałęsa and Kiszczak co-chaired the meetings.

The Polish communists, led by General Jaruzelski, hoped to co-opt prominent opposition leaders into the ruling group without significantly changing the political power structure. In reality, the talks radically altered the shape of the Polish government and society. The events in Poland precipitated and gave momentum to the fall of the entire European communist bloc; the Yalta arrangement collapsed soon after the events in Poland.

== Sessions ==
The sessions were divided into three main committees:

- Political reforms committee
- Trade unions pluralism committee
- Economy and social politics committee

Alongside main committees subcommittees and working groups were established:

- Subcommittees:
  - Subcommittee on ecology
  - Subcommittee on mining
  - Subcommittee on housing policy
  - Subcommittee on youth affairs
  - Subcommittee on science, education and technical progress
  - Subcommittee on law and court reforms
  - Subcommittee on agriculture
  - Subcommittee on mass media
  - Subcommittee on associations and local government
  - Subcommittee on healthcare
- Working groups:
  - Working group on wage and income indexation
  - Working group on property rights of trade unions
  - Working group on amending the Trade Union Act
  - Working group on local government
  - Working group on associations
  - Working group on assumptions for the draft act on the rights of certain employees to re-establish an employment relationship
  - Working group on the act on trade unions of individual farmers.

Specific issues were handled by these work groups, although meetings often ground to a halt. This was caused by a mutual distrust of the factions and an obvious unwillingness of the government faction to relinquish power. The most controversial questions were:

- Pay raises and indexation
- Future pluralist elections
- The limit of the future president's competence
- The limit of competence for the future parliament
- The access to mass communication media by opposition forces

Principal negotiators of the governing coalition and the opposition camp were chosen by their leaders; respectively Wojciech Jaruzelski (although he did not participate in the talks), Mieczysław Rakowski, Józef Czyrek and Stanisław Ciosek, and then Lech Wałęsa and Henryk Wujec. It is essential to notice that both parties maintained a sense of high legitimacy during the conversations; Solidarity based on representing the society and transparent informing the broad public about the course of the talks, whereas the authorities based on holding the real power and belief that they still represent the interests of a vital part of the society. The most important topics of negotiations were future elections, the position of the president, Senate, practical reforms of the state's structure, and bringing back free associations and unions.

Several radical opposition organizations opposed the talks as they did not believe in the good intentions of the sitting government. Despite their fears, several critical documents were signed after the sessions on 5 April. These documents became known as the Round Table Agreement.

== Participants ==
Throughout talks almost 452 people participated in it. Many participants of the talks afterwards held important positions. Among them were three future presidents (Lech Wałęsa, Aleksander Kwaśniewski, Lech Kaczyński), five prime ministers (Czesław Kiszczak, Tadeusz Mazowiecki, Jan Olszewski, Leszek Miller, Jarosław Kaczyński), four deputy prime ministers, six marshals and deputy marshals of the Sejm and the Senate, over 75 ministers and deputy ministers, about 100 MPs and the First President of the Supreme Court (Adam Strzembosz).

== List of the plenary sessions participants ==
=== Ruling coalition: ===
- Tomasz Adamczuk (ZSL)
- Norbert Aleksiewicz (PZPR)
- Stanisław Ciosek (PZPR)
- Aleksander Gieysztor (independent)
- Wiesław Gwiżdż (Polish Catholic and Social Association, PZKS)
- Marek Hołdakowski (PZPR)
- Jan Janowski (SD)
- Janusz Jarliński (All-Poland Alliance of Trade Unions, OPZZ)
- Czesław Kiszczak (PZPR)
- Zenon Komender (PAX Association)
- Jan Karol Kostrzewski (independent)
- Mikołaj Kozakiewicz (ZSL)
- Bogdan Królewski (ZSL)
- Aleksander Kwaśniewski (PZPR)
- Maciej Manicki (OPZZ)
- Harald Matuszewski (OPZZ)
- Leszek Miller (PZPR)
- Alfred Miodowicz (OPZZ)
- Kazimierz Morawski (Christian Social Association, ChSS)
- Jerzy Ozdowski (independent)
- Anna Przecławska (independent)
- Tadeusz Rączkiewicz (OPZZ)
- Jan Rychlewski (PZPR)
- Władysław Siła-Nowicki (Christian-Democratic Labour Party, ChDSP)
- Zbigniew Sobotka (PZPR)
- Romuald Sosnowski (OPZZ)
- Stanisław Wiśniewski (OPZZ)
- Jan Zaciura (PZPR)
- Edward Zgłobicki (SD)
- Hieronim Kubiak (PZPR)

=== "Solidarity" opposition: ===
- Stefan Bratkowski
- Zbigniew Bujak
- Władysław Findeisen
- Władysław Frasyniuk
- Bronisław Geremek
- Mieczysław Gil
- Aleksander Hall
- Jacek Kuroń
- Władysław Liwak
- Tadeusz Mazowiecki
- Jacek Merkel
- Adam Michnik
- Alojzy Pietrzyk
- Edward Radziewicz
- Henryk Samsonowicz
- Grażyna Staniszewska
- Andrzej Stelmachowski
- Stanisław Stomma
- Klemens Szaniawski
- Jan Józef Szczepański
- Edward Szwajkiewicz
- Józef Ślisz
- Witold Trzeciakowski
- Jerzy Turowicz
- Lech Wałęsa
- Andrzej Wielowieyski

=== Church side observers ===
- Bronisław Dembowski
- Bishop of the Evangelical Church of the Augsburg Confession Janusz Narzyński
- Alojzy Orszulik

=== Spokespersons ===
- Janusz Onyszkiewicz (representing opposition)
- Jerzy Urban (representing government)

== Results ==
An agreement ("Round Table Agreement") was signed on 6 April 1989. The most important demands, including those reflected in the April Novelization, were:

- Legalization of independent trade unions
- The introduction of the office of President (thereby annulling the power of the Communist party general secretary), who would be elected to a six-year term
- The formation of a Senate

As a result, real political power was vested in a newly created bicameral legislature and in a president who would be the chief executive. Solidarity became a legitimate and legal political party. Free election to 35% of the seats in Sejm and an entirely free election to the Senate was assured.

The Round Table Agreement also brought more plurality in public media. It allowed for the creation of a first, fully independent journal 'Gazeta Wyborcza', whose first edition was published on May 8, 1989. The politicians of the opposition were invited to the national public media, and the spots of Solidarity were released in public television. Simultaneously, Solidarity started to publish their own weekly newspaper 'Tygodnik Solidarności', whose editor-in-chief became Tadeusz Mazowiecki.

The election of 4 June 1989 brought a landslide victory to Solidarity: 99% of all the seats in the Senate and all of the 35% possible seats in Sejm. Jaruzelski, whose name was the only one the PZPR allowed on the ballot for the presidency, won by just one vote in the National Assembly. The 65–35 division was soon abolished as well, after the first truly free Sejm elections.

== Criticism ==
Andrzej Gwiazda, who was one of the leaders of the so-called First Solidarity (August 1980 – December 1981), claims that the Round Table Agreement and the negotiations that took place before it at a Communist government's Ministry of the Interior and Administration (Poland) conference center (late 1988 and early 1989) in the village of Magdalenka had been arranged by Moscow. According to Gwiazda, who himself did not take part in the negotiations, the Soviets "carefully selected a group of opposition activists, who passed on as representatives of the whole [Polish] society, and made a deal with them".

This notion was supported by Anna Walentynowicz, who in an interview given in 2005 stated that the Agreement was a "success of the Communists, not of the nation". According to Walentynowicz, Czesław Kiszczak and Wojciech Jaruzelski, who initiated the negotiations, "safeguarded their own safety and (...) influence on the government". Walentynowicz claims that the talks were organized so that in the future, "no Communist criminal, murderer or thief would pay for their crimes".

Antoni Macierewicz regards the negotiations and the agreement as a "classic Soviet plot of the secret services". In his opinion, both Kiszczak and Jaruzelski were "at every stage controlled by their Soviet overseers (...) and their autonomy was minimal". As Macierewicz said in February 2009, the Round Table was a "tactical success of the parts of the elites, but from the point of view of national interests of Poland, it was a failure".

Piotr Bączek of Gazeta Polska weekly wrote that in the mid-1980s, the so-called Communist Team of three (Jerzy Urban, General Władysław Pożoga and Stanisław Ciosek), suggested that among opposition activists, "search for people, who are politically available" should be initiated, as "yesterday's opponent, drawn into the power, becomes a zealous ally". In June 1987 Mieczysław Rakowski, in a report handed to General Jaruzelski, wrote that a "change in the attitude towards the opposition must be initiated (...) Maybe, out of numerous oppositional fractions, one movement would be selected and allowed to participate in the governing", wrote Rakowski. Bączek's opinion is backed by Filip Musiał, a historian of Kraków's office of Institute of National Remembrance. In June 2008 Musiał stated that the Team of three was ordered to find a solution to a problem, which troubled Communist government of Poland. Economic situation of the country was worsening in the late 1980s, and the threat of social unrest was real. At the same time, the Communists did not want to relinquish power, so they prepared, in Musiał's words, "a political marketing operation".

Musiał says that General Czesław Kiszczak himself decided which oppositional activists were "politically available" – the condition was that the candidates had to be supportive of "evolution" of the system, not its "radical rejection". Therefore, most opposition activists, who took part in the negotiations, were those who at different points of their lives were close to the "Marxist doctrine" or belonged to the Communist party. Furthermore, all participants were carefully scrutinized by the secret services. As a result, Poland was "the first Eastern Europe country, in which talks were initiated, but the last, in which completely free elections were organized, in the fall of 1991". The first prime minister after this election, Jan Olszewski, said that "basic issues had been settled before [the talks], and the negotiations at the Round Table were about secondary matters".

== See also ==
- Contract Sejm
- 2019 Sudanese transition to democracy
