= 1989 Polish presidential election =

- 19 July 1989

Needed to win: Majority of members present, excluding invalid votes 537 valid voters in the National Assembly 269 votes needed to win
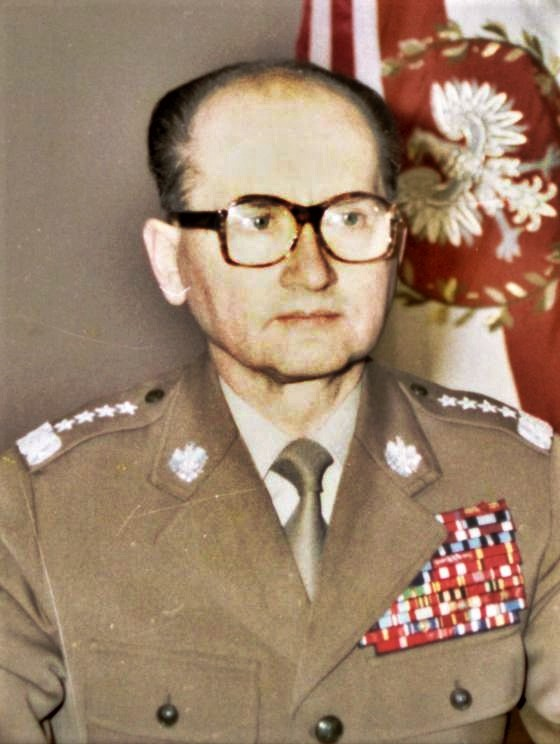

Nominee	Wojciech Jaruzelski	Against
Party	PZPR
Alliance	PRON
Electoral vote	270	233
Percentage	50.28%	43.39%
Nominators	PZPR, ZSL, SD, PAX, UChS, PZKS
Chairman of the Council of State before election
Wojciech Jaruzelski
PZPR
Elected President
Wojciech Jaruzelski
PZPR

Indirect presidential elections were held in Poland on 19 July 1989. The elections were the first after the office of President of the Republic of Poland had been re-established after a period of Communist rule and were the last in which the President was elected by Parliament (joint houses of the Sejm and Senate). Despite adoption of the democratic system there was only one candidate.

After the Round Table Agreement, which resulted in a semi-free parliamentary election, marked by effective Solidarity victory and de facto loss of the Polish United Workers' Party, on July 4, 1989, Adam Michnik proposed a power-sharing deal between communist and the democratic opposition (Your President, our Prime Minister), according to which Chairman of the Council of State and Communist leader Wojciech Jaruzelski would become president and a Solidarity representative would become Prime Minister (this position indeed went to Tadeusz Mazowiecki in August, albeit after an attempt by Jaruzelski to impose fellow PZPR member Czesław Kiszczak as Prime Minister). After much debate within both camps this conception won.

Jaruzelski ran unopposed, but won by just a one-vote majority needed, as many Solidarity MPs, while supporting the agreement, felt just unable to cast their votes or, to not disturb the process, cast abstain or invalid votes.

== Electoral system ==
The President was elected by the National Assembly, a joint sitting of the Sejm and the Senate, by open ballot. The members of the Assembly were elected in the 1989 Polish parliamentary election; although 460 deputies and 100 senators (making 560 electors) had been elected, senator Grzegorz Białkowski died before the presidential election and his replacement was yet to be chosen.

The composition of the National Assembly was as follows:

Parliamentary group	Sejm	Senate	Totals
Civic Parliamentary Club	161	98	259
Polish United Workers' Party	173	—	173
United People's Party	76	—	76
Alliance of Democrats	27	—	27
PAX Association	10	—	10
Christian-Social Union	8	—	8
Polish Catholic-Social Association	5	—	5
PRON-aligned nonpartisan	—	1	1
Vacant seat	—	1	1
Total	460	100 (99)	560 (559)

== Results ==
Candidate	Party	Votes	%
Wojciech Jaruzelski	Polish United Workers' Party	270	50.28
Against		233	43.39
Abstention		34	6.33
Total		537	100.00
Valid votes		537	98.71
Invalid/blank votes		7	1.29
Total votes		544	100.00
Registered voters/turnout		559	97.32
Source: New York Times, Sejm Stenogram

=== By party ===
Candidate	Total votes	Votes by party							
Candidate	Total votes	PZPR	OKP	ZSL	SD	PAX	UChS	PZKS	PRON
Wojciech Jaruzelski	270	171	1 (Note: Stanisław Bernatowicz)	54	20	10	8	5	1
Against	233	1 (Note: Marian Czerwiński)	222	6 (Note: Czesław Janicki, Teresa Liszcz, Jacek Soska, Stanisław Wiąckowski, Józef Wlekliński, and Władysław Żabiński)	4 (Note: Tadeusz Bień, Krzysztof Czereyski, Kazimierz Czerwiński, and Kazimierz Ujazdowski)				
Abstention	34		18 (Note: Andrzej Arendarski, Włodzimierz Bojarski, Ryszard Bugaj, Andrzej Celiński, Zbigniew Drela, Władysław Findeisen, Mieczysław Gil, Henryk Grządzielski, Jan Król, Andrzej Machalski, Adam Mitura, Walerian Pańko, Bohdan Pilarski, Walerian Piotrowski, Andrzej Rozmarynowicz, Andrzej Sikora, Wiesław Zajączkowski, and Andrzej Zawiślak)	13 (Note: Edward Baścik, Andrzej Borowski, Janusz Dobrosz, Zdzisław Domański, Michał Górski, Stanisław Jasiński, Franciszek Kieć, Janusz Maćkowiak, Zbigniew Mierzwa, Wojciech Mojzesowicz, Grażyna Sołtyk, Jan Warjan, and Józef Zych)	3 (Note: Tadeusz Dziuba, Bohdan Osiński and Jan Świtka)				
Invalid votes	7		7 (Note: Witysław Dys-Kulerski, Andrzej Miłkowski, Aleksander Paszyński, Andrzej Stelmachowski, Stanisław Stomma, Witold Trzeciakowski, and Andrzej Wielowieyski)						
Not present	15	1 (Note: Jerzy Rozwandowicz)	11 (Note: Paweł Chrupek, Adela Dankowska, Marek Jurek, Lech Kozaczko, Zdzisław Nowicki, Krzysztof Pawłowski, Andrzej Piesiak, Maria Stępniak, Andrzej Szczepkowski, Mieczysław Ustasiak, and Henryk Wujec)	3 (Note: Alicja Kornasiewicz, Józef Łochowski, and Teresa Malczewska)					
Total Yes/No	503	172	233	60	24	10	8	5	1
Total valid	537	172	241	73	27	10	8	5	1
Total votes	544	172	248	73	27	10	8	5	1
Source: Sejm Stenogram
