= Findeisen =

Findeisen is a German surname. Notable people with the surname include:

- Herbert Findeisen (1913–1963), German Luftwaffe fighter ace
- Stephen Findeisen (born 1993 or 1994), better known as Coffeezilla, American YouTuber and cryptocurrency journalist
- Theodor Albin Findeisen (1881–1936), German double bass player and composer
- Ulf Findeisen (born 1962), East German ski jumper
- Walter Findeisen (1909–1945), German meteorologist
- Władysław Findeisen (1926–2023), Polish engineer and politician
