= Opinion polling on the Wojciech Jaruzelski presidency =

Surveying on 1989–1990 Polish administration

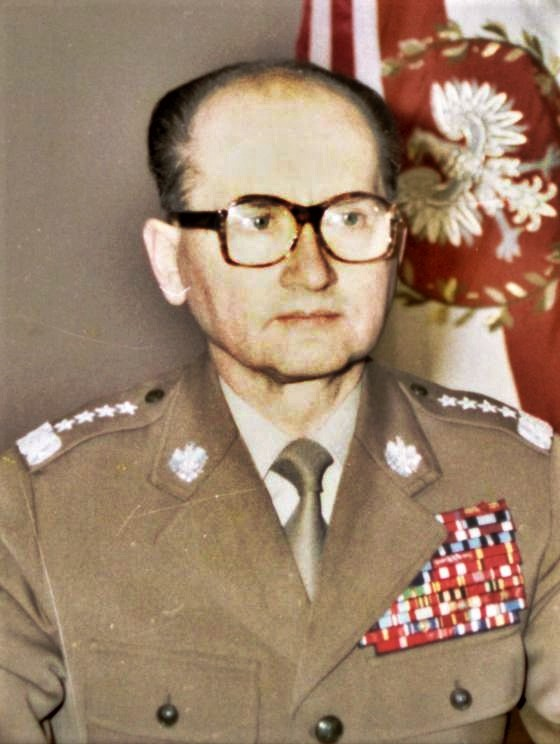
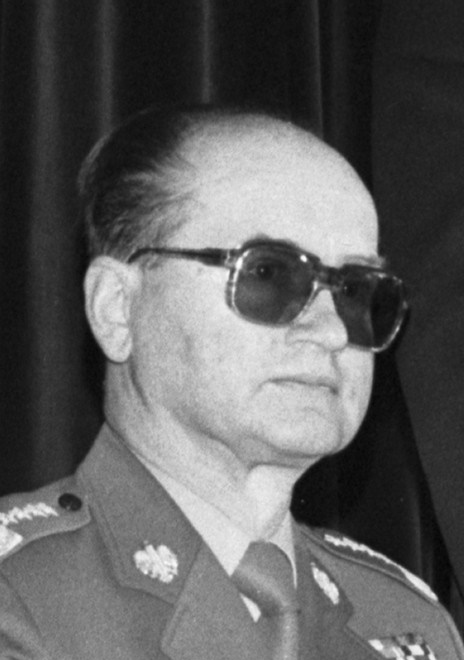
Wojciech Jaruzelski in 1981 and 1982.

Wojciech Jaruzelski served as the President of Poland from his election in 1989 to the inauguration of Lech Wałęsa after the 1990 presidential election. Throughout Jaruzelski's presidency, polling agencies conducted opinion polls gauging his approval rating as president.

== Approval polls ==
=== Approval rating ===
Date(s) conducted	Polling firm/Link	Sample size	Approve	Disapprove	Neither	Don't know/Neutral	Net approval
18 Nov 1990 (Note: Poll conclusion date)	CBOS	1,490	32	44		24	–12
23 Oct 1990	CBOS	1,477	30	48		22	–18
17 Sep 1990	CBOS	1,459	36	42		22	–6
15 Jul 1990	CBOS	1,481	39	37		24	2
26 Jun 1990	CBOS	1,490	44	36		20	8
23 May 1990	CBOS	1,474	47	30		23	17
24 Apr 1990	CBOS	1,387	49	31		20	18
26 Mar 1990	CBOS	1,502	58	27		15	31
16–19 Feb 1990	CBOS	1,498	61	25		14	36
13–15 Jan 1990	CBOS	1,486	65.5	19.0		15.3	46.5
21 Nov 1989	CBOS	1497	69	15		16	54
14 Sep 1989	CBOS	999	74	14		12	60

== See also ==
- 1989 Polish presidential election
- 1990 Polish presidential election
