= Piotr Bujnowicz =

Film producer and photographer

Piotr Bujnovich
- Born: 17 June 1973 (age 52); Łódź, Poland
- Occupations: Producer, photographer, still photographer
- Website: Trailer and More

Piotr Bujnovich is a Polish-born, Golden Trailer awarded producer, and photographer.

"Golden Duck" awarded producer and photographer, National Film School in Lodz graduate. Produced promotional materials, cinema trailers and television commercials for such partners as Monolith Films, Warner Bros. and HBO, to name a few. Author of visuals and still photography of the vast majority of latest big budget Polish films. Producer and Co-author of promotional campaigns for feature films by Andrzej Wajda, Krzysztof Zanussi, Juliusz Machulski, Jan Jakub Kolski, Agnieszka Holland, Jerzy Kawalerowicz, Wojciech Marczewski and Peter Greenaway. Owner of Fabryka Obrazu film promotion agency. In 2009, together with Szymon Lenkowski he formed Trailer and More, and started creating cinema movie trailers. In 2010 nominated for Golden Trailer Awards, for General Nil trailer. In 2011 his Little Rose trailer won the Golden Trailer Awards. National Film School in Łódź graduate.

== Awards ==
- 2011 – Golden Trailer Awards – Best Foreign Romantic trailer for Little Rose (aka. Różyczka) trailer Szymon Lenkowski, Piotr Bujnowicz – Winner
- 2010 – Golden Trailer Awards – Best Foreign trailer for General Nil, Szymon Lenkowski, Piotr Bujnowicz – Nomination
- 2001 – Golden Duck – Award granted by Film critics in Poland, for Introducing New Values in the field of Photography Film

== Selected filmography ==
=== Trailers and more ===
- 2012 – Walesa. Man of Hope dir. Andrzej Wajda – producer
- 2011 – In Treatment (aka. Bez tajemnic) HBO Poland TV Series, dir. Anna Kazejak-Dawid, Jacek Borcuch – producer
- 2010 – Little Rose (aka. Rosebud, aka. Różyczka) feature film, dir. Jan Kidawa Błoński – producer
- 2010 – General Nil feature film, dir. Ryszard Bugajski – producer
- 2010 – (Kołysanka) dir. Juliusz Machulski – producer
- 2009 – (Janosik. Prawdziwa historia) dir. Kasia Adamik, Agnieszka Holland – producer
- 2009 – (Galerianki) dir. Katarzyna Rosłaniec – producer
- 2009 – (Ostatnia akcja) dir. Michał Rogalski – producer
- 2008 – (Ile waży koń trojański?) dir. Juliusz Machulski – producer
- 2008 – (Rozmowy nocą) dir. Maciej Żak – producer
- 2007 – Katyń dir. Andrzej Wajda – producer
- 2007 – (Wino truskawkowe) dir. Dariusz Jabłoński – producer

=== Feature films, TV series ===
- 2011 (Och Karol 2)– still photographer, promotional visuals
- 2009 (Janosik. Prawdziwa historia) – still photographer, promotional visuals
- 2009 (Janosik. Prawdziwa historia (serial telewizyjny))- still photographer, promotional visuals
- 2009 (Świnki) 2009 – still photographer, promotional visuals
- 2009 (Tatarak) 2009 -still photographer, promotional visuals
- 2007 – 2012 (Barwy szczęścia (TV series)) – still photographer, promotional visuals
- 2007 Katyń – still photographer, promotional visuals; The Best Foreign Feature Film, Academy Award-nominated feature
- 2007 Nightwatching – still photographer, promotional visuals
- 2007 (Regina (TV series)) – still photographer, promotional visuals
- 2007 (Ryś) – still photographer, promotional visuals
- 2007 (Świadek koronny) – still photographer, promotional visuals
- 2007 (Wino truskawkowe) – still photographer, promotional visuals
- 2006 (Francuski numer) – still photographer, promotional visuals
- 2006 Jasminum – still photographer, promotional visuals
- 2005 (Codzienna 2 m. 3 TV series) – still photographer, promotional visuals
- 2005 (Komornik) – still photographer, promotional visuals
- 2005 – 2007 (Magda M.) – still photographer, promotional visuals
- 2005 (Persona non grata) – still photographer, promotional visuals
- 2005 (Solidarność, Solidarność... ) – still photographer, promotional visuals
- 2004 (Cud w Krakowie) – still photographer, promotional visuals
- 2004 (Nigdy w życiu!) - still photographer, promotional visuals
- 2004 (Officer (TV series)) - still photographer, promotional visuals
- 2004 (Out of reach) - still photographer, promotional visuals
- 2004 The Aryan Couple - still photographer, promotional visuals
- 2003–2008 (Glina (TV series)) – still photographer, promotional visuals
- 2002 (Pornografia) – still photographer, promotional visuals
- 2002 (Haker)- still photographer, promotional visuals
- 2002 (Przedwiośnie)- still photographer, promotional visuals
- 2002 (Quo vadis) (TV series) – still photographer, promotional visuals
- 2002 (Supplement)- still photographer, promotional visuals
- 2002 (Zemsta) – still photographer, promotional visuals
- 2001 (Przedwiośnie) – still photographer, promotional visuals
- 2001 Quo vadis – still photographer, promotional visuals
- 2001 (Stacja) – still photographer, promotional visuals
- 2000 (Weiser) – still photographer, promotional visuals
- 1999 Pan Tadeusz – still photographer, promotional visuals
- 1999 (Prawo ojca) – still photographer, promotional visuals
- 1999 (Voyages) – still photographer, promotional visuals
- 1998 (Amok) – still photographer, promotional visuals
- 1998 (Rider of the Flames) – still photographer, promotional visuals
- 1998 (Złoto dezerterów) – still photographer, promotional visuals
- 1998 (Brat naszego Boga) – still photographer, promotional visuals
- 1998 (Prostytutki) – still photographer, promotional visuals
- 1998 (Taekwondo) – still photographer, promotional visuals
- 1995 (Cwał) – still photographer, promotional visuals
