= Erich Hartmann (disambiguation) =

Erich Hartmann may refer to:

- Erich Hartmann (1922–1993), German WWII fighter pilot and leading flying ace of all time
- Erich Hartmann (photographer) (1922–1999), German-American photographer
- Erich Hartmann (musician) (1920–2020), German musician and member of the Berlin Philharmonic Orchestra

== See also ==
- Erik Hartman, a fictional TV personality from the Belgian sketch comedy show In de gloria
- Eric Hartman, a fictional character from the film A Bullet for Joey
