= Lenkowski =

Lenkowski (feminine: Lenkowska) is a surname of Polish origin. Notable people with the surname include:

- Krystyna Lenkowska (born 1957), Polish poet and translator
- Szymon Lenkowski (born 1981), Polish cinematographer and director
