= Alexiewicz =

Alexiewicz or Aleksiewicz is a Polish surname of East Slavic origin. It is a Patronymic surname literally meaning "son of Alexius". The Belarusian spelling of the surname is Alexievich. Notable people with this surname include:

- Andrzej Alexiewicz (1917–1995), Polish mathematician
- Józef Aleksiewicz (1884–1957), Polish military physician
- Norbert Aleksiewicz (1948–1994), Polish politician
- Svetlana Alexievich (born 1948), Belarusian writer
