= Zły =

Zły (Polish for evil), was a Polish magazine that was created by Małgorzata Daniszewska, the wife of Jerzy Urban.

== History and profile ==
Zły was published from 1998 to 2000. The magazine contained real stories of crime and of real accidents. Often the articles included additional photos and illustrations which appeared macabre. In 2000, workers at the magazine's distributor, Ruch, refused to distribute the magazine to kiosks.
