= Magdalena Boczarska =

Polish actress (born 1978)

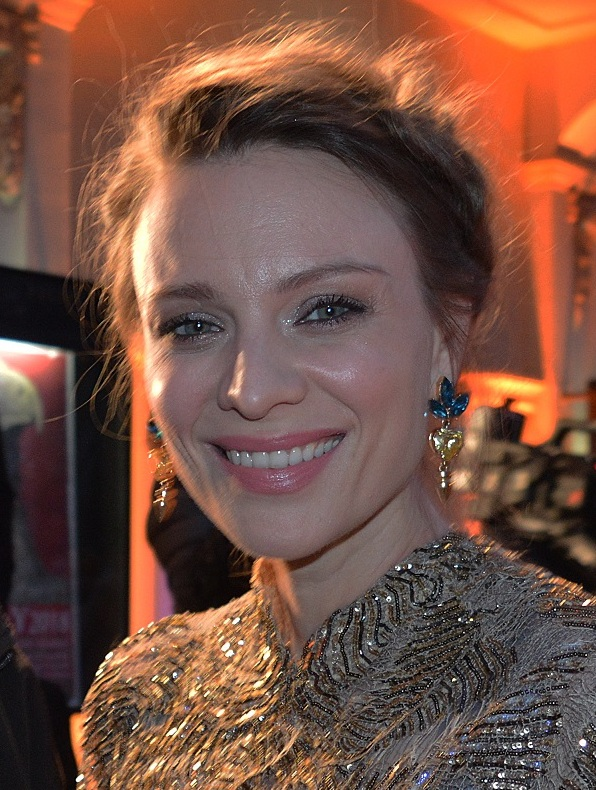
- Boczarska in 2018
- Born: 12 December 1978 (age 47); Kraków, Poland
- Occupation: Actress
- Years active: 2001–present
- Partner: Mateusz Banasiuk (2014–present)
- Children: 1

Magdalena Jadwiga Boczarska ([bɔt͡ʂarska]; born 12 December 1978) is a Polish actress who has appeared in more than 25 feature films since 2001.

She has twice received the IFFI Best Actor Award (Female): Silver Peacock Award, at the 41st and the 44th International Film Festival of India for her roles in Little Rose and In Hiding. In 2018, she was honoured by the Polish Film Academy for her portrayal of Michalina Wisłocka in the biopic Sztuka kochania winning the Polish Academy Award for Best Actress.

== Early years ==
She was born in Kraków, where she graduated from Secondary School No. 21, attending an art class. In 2001, she graduated from the Ludwik Solski State Higher School of Theatre in Kraków (Państwowa Wyższa Szkoła Teatralna im. Ludwika Solskiego w Krakowie).

== Acting career ==
During her studies, she performed at the Theatre Schools Festival in Łódź in the play Paradise Garden as a Woman, for which she received the Mikołaj Grabowski award.

After graduation, she made her debut on the stage of the New Theatre in Łódź with the title role in the play The Water Hen (Kurka Wodna), directed by Łukasz Kos. Since 2003, she has been working at the National Theatre in Warsaw. Since then, she has collaborated with Studio Buffo in Warsaw, Carrousel Theatre in Berlin and Teatro Tatro in Slovakia.

Since 2005, she has appeared in popular TV series, both Polish and German. In 2007, she played the lead female role in the comedy duo Konecki and Saramonowicz Testosteron. After other roles in the duo's films, Lejdis and The Ideal Guy for My Girl, she received the lead role in the drama Różyczka directed by Jan Kidawa-Błoński. For her role in Różyczka, an agent of the Security Services, she received the award for the best actress at the 35th Polish Film Festival in Gdynia and the Silver Peacock statuette for the best actress at the 41st International Film Festival in Goa.

In 2017, she played the title role in the biopic Sztuka kochania. The story of Michalina Wisłocka, for which she was awarded the Eagle in the Best Female Lead Role category. In 2019, she played Maria Piłsudska, Józef Piłsudski's first wife, in the movie Piłsudski. For this role, she received the award for best actress at the 44th Polish Film Festival in Gdynia.

== Selected filmography ==
Film
Year	Title	Role	Notes
2017	The Art of Loving	Michalina Wisłocka	
2013	In Hiding		
2010	Little Rose		
2009	Zero		

TV
Year	Title	Role	Notes
2020	The Elements of Sasza – Fire	Sasza Załuska	
2007	Dylematu 5		
2022	Hold Tight	Anna Barczyk	

== Filmography ==
=== Feature film roles ===
- 2006: Pod powierzchnią − as Ania
- 2007: Testosteron − as Alicja
- 2007: Futro − as Ania Witkowska, sister of Alicji
- 2008: Lejdis − as Arletta, Mark's lover
- 2008: Putzfrau Undercover − as Irina
- 2009: Idealny facet dla mojej dziewczyny − as Luna
- 2009: Zero − as Kasjerka/Cashier
- 2010: Little Rose − as Kamila „Różyczka” Sakowicz
- 2011: How to Get Rid of Cellulite − as Kornelia Matejko
- 2012: Ixjana − as Marlena
- 2012: Bejbi blues − as matka Natalii
- 2013: W ukryciu − as Janina
- 2014: Obywatel − as John's mother when younger
- 2014: The Last Family − as Ewa
- 2017: Sztuka kochania – as Michalina Wisłocka
- 2017: Pod niemieckimi łóżkami (Unter deutschen Betten) – as Justyna Polańska
- 2019: Piłsudski – as Maria Piłsudska
- 2019: The Coldest Game – as a barmaid
- 2020: Magnesium as Helena
- 2023: Heaven in Hell - as a lawyer

=== Television serials ===
- 2001: Klinika pod Wyrwigroszem − as a student
- 2005 – 2006: Tango z aniołem − as Kama Jarczyńska
- 2005: Pensjonat pod Różą − as Zosia Nowacka, Bartek's fiancé (odc. 42 i 43)
- 2005: Na dobre i na złe − as Magda Hertman (odc. 221)
- 2005: Abschnitt 40 − as Elena (odc. 23)
- 2006: Dylematu 5 − as Katarzyna
- 2007: Determinator − as Marzena Pietruszko, journalist
- 2007 – 2008: Barwy szczęścia − as Patrycja, journalist w redakcji Marty
- 2007: Miejsce zbrodni − as Agnieszka Sobinski (odc. 681)
- 2008: Teraz albo nigdy! − as Ada Tulak
- 2008 – 2009: 39 i pół − as Kicia, Catherine's secretary, then Darius'
- 2009; 2011: Czas honoru − as Lola, a prisoner of Pawiak prison; Karolina Osmańska
- 2009: Ihr Auftrag, Pater Castell − as Magdalena Lubinski (odc. 7)
- 2012: Misja Afganistan − as journalist Marta (odc. 6 i 13)
- 2013: Rodzinka.pl − as Iza (odc. 106)
- 2013: Lekarze − as Olga Rojko
- 2014: Prawo Agaty − as Julita Krzyszkiewicz (odc. 76)
- 2014: Zbrodnia – as Agnieszka Lubczyńska
- 2015: Mąż czy nie mąż – as Ewa, przyjaciółka Marty
- 2016 – 2017: Druga szansa – as Sara Daymer
- 2017: Der Usedom Krimi − as Małgorzata Kamińska (odc. 3 – Engelmacher)
- 2018 – 2019: Pod powierzchnią – as Marta Gajewska
- 2019: Zasada przyjemności – as Janina Zarychta (odc. 6)

== Theatrical roles ==
- 2000: Letnicy as Sonia (PWST Kraków)
- 2001: Rajski ogródek (PWST Kraków)
- 2002: Kurka wodna as kurka wodna (Teatr Nowy in Łódź)
- 2003, 2010: Merlin. Inna historia as Virginea, czyli Viviana (National Theatre in Warsaw)
- 2005: Tiramisu as Kreatywna (Laboratorium Dramatu)
- 2008: HollyDay jak Holly (Teatr Studio im. Stanisława Ignacego Witkiewicza)
- 2009: Boeing Boeing as Johanna (Studio Buffo)
- 2010: O północy przybyłem do Widawy... czyli Opis obyczajów III (Teatr IMKA)
- 2010: Wodzirej (Teatr IMKA)
- 2011: Henryk Sienkiewicz – Greatest Hits (Teatr IMKA)
- 2012: Histerie miłosne (Studio Buffo)
- 2013: Kto się boi Virginii Woolf? as Żabcia (Teatr IMKA)
- 2014: Medea as Medea (Teatr "Polonia")

== Awards and nominations ==
- 2001: nagroda dyrektora Teatru Nowego w Łodzi za rolę Kobiety w przedstawieniu Rajski ogródek Tadeusza Różewicza w reżyserii Pawła Miśkiewicza na XIX Festiwalu Szkół Teatralnych w Łodzi.
- 2003: nagroda za debiut za rolę tytułową w przedstawieniu Kurka wodna Witkacego w Teatrze Nowym w Łodzi na XXVIII Opolskich Konfrontacjach Teatralnych w Opolu.
- 2005: nagroda dla duetu aktorskiego (z Jarosławem Gajewskim) za rolę Viviany w przedstawieniu Merlin. Inna Historia Tadeusza Słobodzianka w Teatrze Narodowym w Warszawie oraz mała statuetka Wojciecha – nagroda dziennikarzy na XLV Kaliskich Spotkaniach Teatralnych w Kaliszu.
- 2010: nagroda za pierwszoplanową rolę kobiecą w filmie Różyczka na 35. Festiwalu Polskich Filmów Fabularnych w Gdyni.
- 2010: Srebrny Paw dla najlepszej aktorki za rolę w filmie Różyczka na Indyjskim Międzynarodowym Festiwalu Filmowym w Goa.
- 2010: nominacja do nagrody im. Zbyszka Cybulskiego za rolę w filmie Różyczka.
- 2011: nominacja do Orła w kategorii Najlepsza główna rola kobieca za rolę w filmie Różyczka.
- 2011: nagroda aktorska za rolę w filmie Różyczka na Międzynarodowym Festiwalu Filmowym „Tiburon” w San Francisco.
- 2012: nagroda aktorska za rolę w filmie Różyczka na Międzynarodowym Festiwalu Filmowym w Santo Domingo.
- 2013: Srebrny Paw dla najlepszej aktorki za rolę w filmie W ukryciu na Indyjskim Międzynarodowym Festiwalu Filmowym w Goa.
- 2017: statuetka Gwiazda Plejady w kategorii Osobowość roku podczas Wielkiej Gali Gwiazd Plejady.
- 2017: Róża Gali w kategorii Film za rolę w filmie Sztuka kochania. Historia Michaliny Wisłockiej.
- 2018: Orzeł w kategorii Najlepsza główna rola kobieca za rolę w filmie Sztuka kochania. Historia Michaliny Wisłockiej.
- 2019: nagroda za pierwszoplanową rolę kobiecą w filmie Piłsudski na 44. Festiwalu Polskich Filmów Fabularnych w Gdyni.
- 2020: Diamentowy Klaps Filmowy festiwalu Kino Letnie Sopot-Zakopane.
