= Nie (magazine) =

Polish magazine

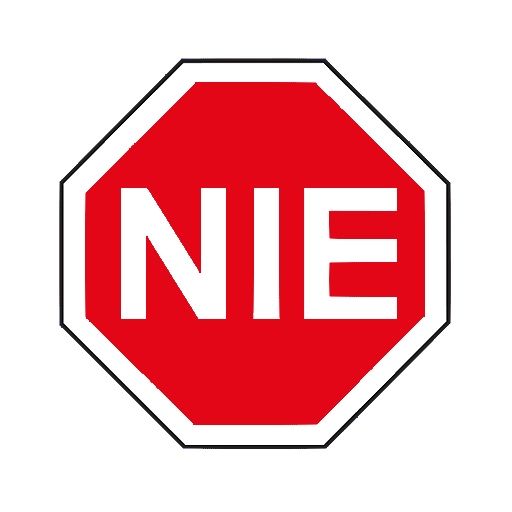

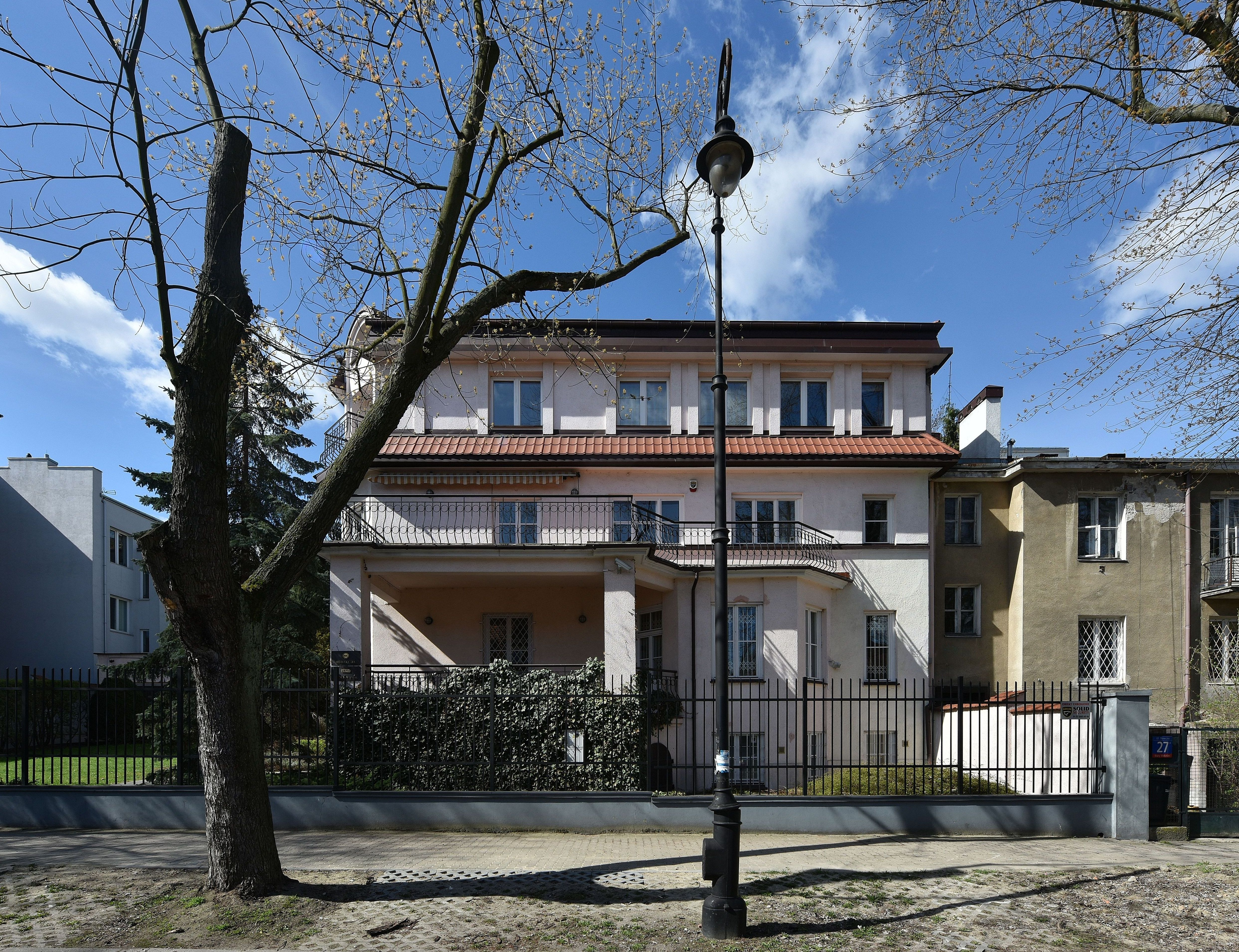
- Nie's headquarters in Mokotów
- Honorary Editor-in-Chief: Jerzy Urban (deceased)
- Editor-in-Chief: Agnieszka Wołk-Łaniewska
- Editorial Secretary: Edyta Baker
- Categories: Political magazine
- Frequency: Weekly
- Publisher: URMA Sp.z o.o.
- Founded: 1990; 36 years ago
- Country: Poland
- Language: Polish
- Website: tygodniknie.pl
- ISSN: 0867-2237

Nie (stylised as NIE; Polish for "No"; pronounced /ɲɛ/) is a Polish weekly magazine published in Warsaw.

== History and profile ==
The magazine was first published in October 1990. It was founded by Jerzy Urban who was the first and only editor-in-chief of the magazine until his death in 2022.

Its political line is left. The magazine is very critical of right wing political views and religion, especially Catholicism. In the 1990s it supported the leader of the Democratic Left Alliance, Aleksander Kwaśniewski. It publishes lot of satirical texts with cartoons and pictures.

Nie had a circulation of 600,000 copies in 1991. In 1995 its circulation was over 700,000 copies.

In 1990 when Solidarity and the church were planning to push a strict new anti-abortion law through parliament, the magazine published a quarter-page, full-color photograph of a nude couple about to make love to warn its readers that "they risked going to jail or being forced into unwanted marriages if they did what the couple in the picture was about to do." The church leaders and President Lech Wałęsa harshly criticized it and in March 1991 the prosecutor's office charged Urban with "publishing an image of pornographic character."

== See also ==
- List of magazines in Poland
