= Stanisław Kopera =

Polish politician (1927–2005)

Member of the Sejm of Poland
- In office 23 March 1980 – 21 July 1985
- Constituency: No. 55

Personal details
- Born: 2 November 1927 Dzielna, Poland
- Died: 25 October 2005 (aged 77) Opoczno, Poland
- Party: Polish United Workers' Party
- Occupation: Politician; Factory worker

Stanisław Kopera (Polish: [staˈɲi.swaf kɔˈpɛ.ra]; 2 November 1927 – 25 October 2005) was a Polish politician and factory worker. He was a member of the Sejm of Poland from 1980 to 1985, representing the constituency no. 55, centered on the city of Radom. Kopera was a member of the Polish United Workers' Party.

== Biography ==
Stanisław Kopera was born on 2 November 1927 in the village Dzielna, then located in the Kielce Voivodeship within the Second Polish Republic, and now a part of the Łódź Voivodeship, Poland. He finished a primary school, and worked in the Gerlach factory in the town of Drzewica in Łódź Voivodeship. He was a member of the executive board of the factory's company committee of the Polish United Workers' Party. From 1980 to 1985, he was a member of the Sejm of Poland, on the mandate of the company committee. He represented the constituency no. 55, centred on the city of Radom. Kopera was a member of the Administration, Land Economy and Environmental Protection Committee, and the Labour and Social Affairs Committee. He died on 25 October 2005 in the town of Opoczno, at the age of 77. Kopera was buried in Drzewica, at the Roman Catholic cemetery of the parish of St. Luke the Evangelist.
