= Sztuka kochania =

Book by Michalina Wisłocka

The Art of Loving
- First edition (Polish)
- Author: Michalina Wisłocka
- Original title: Sztuka kochania
- Language: Polish
- Genre: Non-fiction
- Publisher: Państwowe Wydawnictwo "Iskry"
- Publication date: 1978
- Publication place: Poland
- Media type: Print (Paperback)
- Pages: 312
- ISBN: 978-83-207-1798-3

Sztuka kochania (Polish title; literally The Art of Loving) published in English as A Practical Guide to Marital Bliss) is a popular sex manual written by the pioneering Polish sexologist Michalina Wisłocka, first published in 1978. The book has achieved great publishing success. About 7 million copies were sold in Poland (population 38 million), not including pirated reprints.

== Description ==
The book is considered the first guide to sexual life in a communist country. The author describes methods of contraception, a list of sexual positions and games, historical texts on love talk and methods of satisfying the sexual needs of lonely people. On the other hand, the author of Sztuka kochania also talks a lot about love and the need to understand another human being.

== 2016 republication ==
In 2016, the book was republished, with an introduction by professor Zbigniew Izdebski and a new chapter on contraception. The new edition was released just before the premiere of the biopic Sztuka kochania. Historia Michaliny Wisłockiej (The Art of Loving: The Story of Michalina Wisłocka) directed by Maria Sadowska, with Magdalena Boczarska in the role of Michalina Wisłocka.

== See also ==
- Sex education
