= Ewa Braun =

Polish set decorator, costume designer and production designer (b. 1944)

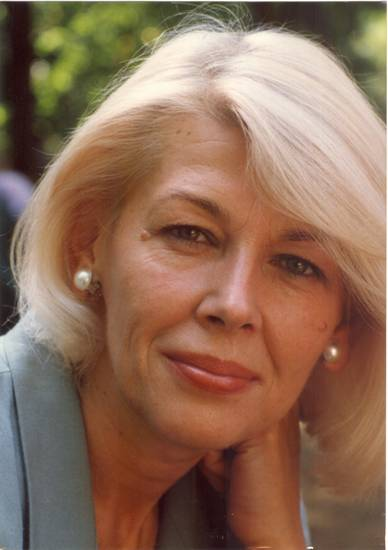
- Born: 2 August 1944 (age 82); Kraków, occupied Poland
- Occupation: Set decorator
- Years active: 1960s–present

Ewa Braun (born 2 August 1944) is a Polish Oscar winning set decorator, costume designer and production designer.

She has been working in production design since the 1960s. Her most famous productions are Europa, Europa (1990) by Agnieszka Holland, Schindler's List (1993) by Steven Spielberg (won Oscar shared with Allan Starski for Best Art Direction/Set Decoration) and Holy Week (1995) by Andrzej Wajda.

Her father was Andrzej Braun. Her aunt was Michalina Anna Wisłocka née Braun.

== Awards and distinctions ==
In 2014, she was awarded the Knight's Cross of the Order of Polonia Restituta and the Gloria Artis Medal for Merit to Culture.
