= Szymon Lenkowski =

Polish cinematographer

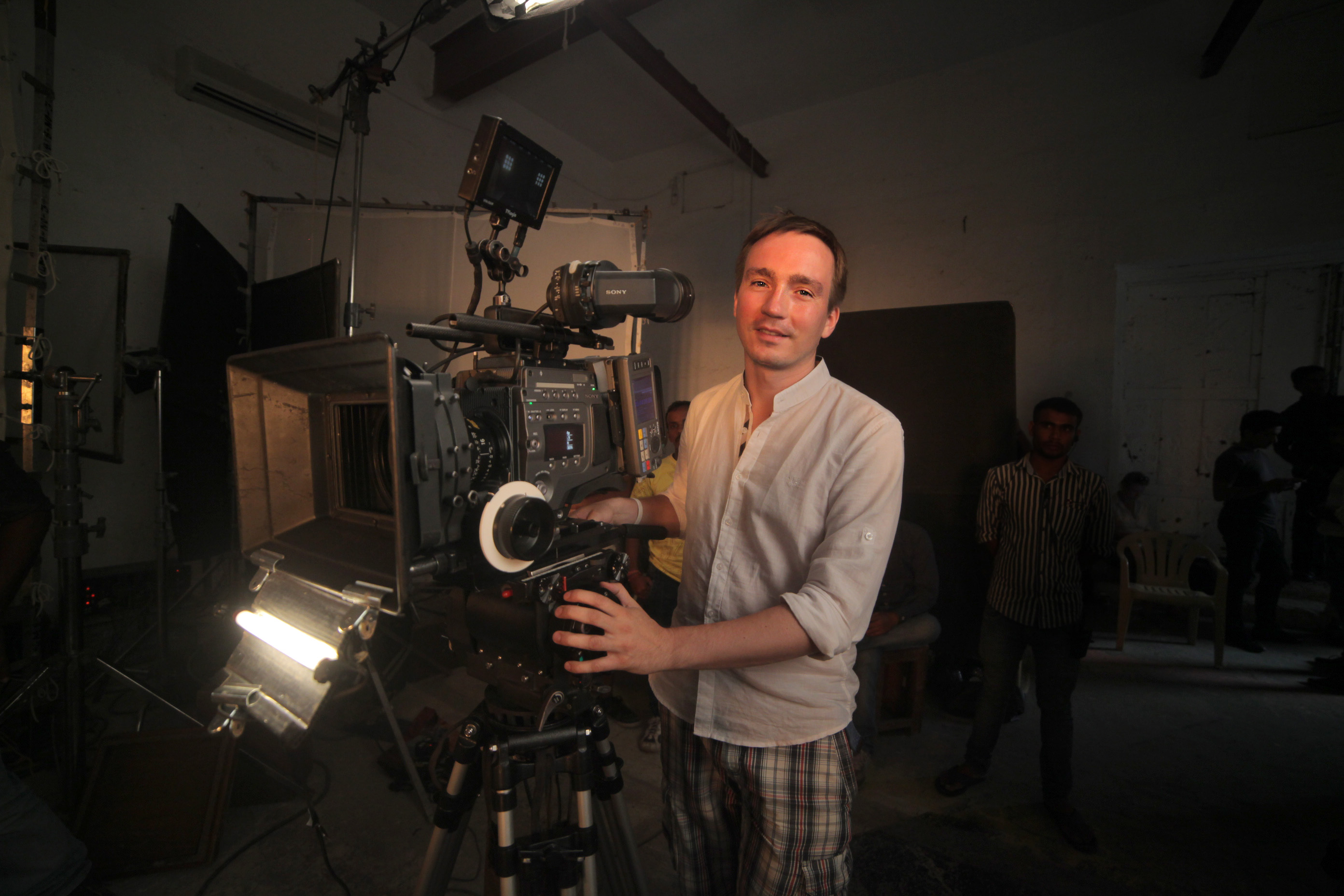
- Lenkowski in 2014
- Born: 28 February 1981; Rzeszów, Poland
- Education: National Film School in Łódź
- Occupations: Cinematographer, director

Szymon Lenkowski (born 28 February 1981) is a Polish cinematographer and director based in Hollywood. Lenkowski has directed photography for 2 feature films, 15 short films, 10 documentary films, 5 music videos, 10 HD multi-camera live concerts, and over 50 television advertisements.

== Early life and education ==
Lenkowski was born on 28 February 1981 in Rzeszów, Poland. In 2005, Lenkowski graduated from the National Film School in Łódź with a degree in cinematography where he was taught by Polish cinematographer Witold Sobocinski.

== Career ==
After winning awards for his short films, Szymon was noticed by Warsaw production companies and started shooting commercials. In his mid-twenties, Lenkowski had already worked for numerous global advertising agencies including Publicis, BBDO, Euro RSCG, Grey, and McCann Erickson.

In 2009, he shot his first feature film and received a nomination for Camerimage Festival's Golden Frog award.

Later in the same year, together with Piotr Bujnowicz he directed Trailer and More, and began creating movie trailers. In 2010, he was nominated for a Golden Trailer Award for the film General Nil. In 2011 he won the Golden Trailer Award for the Little Rose trailer.

His second feature film, Shameless, was expected to be released in the summer of 2012.

== Awards ==
| Year | Award Event | Film title | Award/Prize | Category | Recipient |
|---|---|---|---|---|---|
| 2004 | KAMERA magazine awards | Cyrano | KAMERA magazine award for cinematography | Cinematography | Szymon Lenkowski |
| 2004 | Warsaw (films tomorrow) | Cyrano | Grand Prix | Best student film | |
| 2004 | Kazimierz Dolny (Summer of Films) | Cyrano | Grand Prix | Short film | |
| 2004 | Cracow (Krakffa) | Cyrano | Grand Prix | | |
| 2004 | | Offensiva | Dirty World bronze OFF award | Video art category | |
| 2004 | Milano (MFFS) Italy | Winners and Losers (aka. Zwyciezcy i przegrani) | Mention d’Honneur | Sport and society. Sport and solidarity | |
| 2005 | Prowincjonalia 2005 | Winners and Losers (aka. Zwyciezcy i przegrani) | Award for the Best Documentary Film | | |
| 2005 | Breslau Optimistic Film Festival | “Happy End” – Winners and Losers (aka. Zwyciezcy i przegrani) | Grand Prix | | |
| 2005 | Sopot Film Festiwal | Poor-land (aka. Bieda ziemia) | Special mention | | |
| 2005 | Kielce (Nurt 2005) | The Dwarfs Are Going To Ukraine (aka. Krasnoludki jadą na Ukrainę) | Audience Awards | | |
| 2006 | Szymon Lenkowski Cieszyn (School Film) | Poor-land (aka. Bieda ziemia) | Award for best cinematography | Cinematography | |
| 2005 | Szymon Lenkowski Cieszyn - (Węgiel Student Film Festival) | Poor-land (aka. Bieda ziemia) | Special mention | Cinematography | |
| 2006 | XVI Media Festival „Man in Danger” (Lodz, Poland) | The Seeds (aka. Nasiona) | The Jury's Special Prize (inaugural) | | |
| 2006 | International Documentary Film Festival "Flahertiana" (Perm, Russia) - | The Seeds (aka. Nasiona) | The Great Silver Nanook Prize | | |
| 2006 | 46th Cracow Film Festival (May 2006) | The Seeds (aka. Nasiona) | The Students’ of Cracow Jury Prize | | Grand Prix Złoty Lajkonik, KODAK's Prize for Wojciech Kasperski (dir.) |
| 2006 | L'Alternativa Festival de Cinema Independent de Barcelona | The Seeds (aka. Nasiona) | Special Mention | | |
| 2006 | “Artdokfest”, National Prize of LAVR (Moscow) | The Seeds (aka. Nasiona) | Main Prize for the Art-film | Best writer and director; best photography; best producer | |
| 2006 | Prix Europa, Berlin | The Seeds (aka. Nasiona) | Special Mention | Best television documentary film | |
| 2006 | SILVERDOCS: AFI/Discovery Channel Documentary Festival (USA) | The Seeds (aka. Nasiona) | Main prize | Best short documentary film | |
| 2006 | International Film Festival “Kratkofil” Banja Luka, Bosnia and Herzegovina | The Seeds (aka. Nasiona) | Grand Prix | | |
| 2007 | International Documentary Film Festival of México City (DOCSDF) | The Seeds (aka. Nasiona) | Special Mention | Best International Short Documentary competition | |
| 2007 | Parnu International Documentary and Anthropology Film Festival | The Seeds (aka. Nasiona) | Grand Prix | | |
| 2007 | II International Film Festival Competition CINEMAGIC in Plock | The Seeds (aka. Nasiona) | Main Prize | | |
| 2007 | Big Muddy Film Festival (Carbondale, USA) | The Seeds (aka. Nasiona) | First Prize | Short Documentary Film | |
| 2007 | The Big Sky Documentary Film Festival (Montana, USA) | The Seeds (aka. Nasiona) | The Jury's Special Prize | | |
| 2007 | The CMU International Film Festival 2006 "Faces of Democracy” (Pittsburgh, USA) | The Seeds (aka. Nasiona) | Main Prize | Student's film competition | |
| 2011 | Golden Trailer Awards | Best Foreign Romantic trailer for Little Rose (aka. Różyczka) trailer | Winner | | Szymon Lenkowski, Piotr Bujnowicz |

== Selected filmography ==
- 2002 – Siena - feature film 4’ - director, director of photography
- 2004 – Winners and Loosers (aka. Zwyciezcy i przegrani) – documentary film 52’, dir. Mirosław Dembinski - director of photography
- 2004 – Dirty World, music video 3’, music. artist: TheCalog, - director/ director of photography
- 2004 – Poor-land (aka. Bieda ziemia) - documentary film 35mm 5’, dir. Filip Marczewski - director of photography
- 2004 – Cyrano - feature film DV 17’, dir. Filip Marczewski - director of photography
- 2005 – The Dwarfs Are Going To Ukraine (aka. Krasnoludki jadą na Ukrainę) - documentary film 58’, dir. Miroslaw Dembinski - director of photography
- 2005 – If I Were a Fish - documentary film 18’, dir. Tomasz Wolski - director of photography
- 2006 – The Seeds (aka. Nasiona), documentary film 28’, dir. Wojciech Kasperski - director of photography
- 2007 – Aria Diva – medium length feature film, dir. Agnieszka Smoczyńska - director of photography
- 2008 – Like in heaven (aka. Jak w niebie) - documentary film 28’, dir. Filip Marczewski - director of photography
- 2009 – I am yours (aka. Jestem Twój) – feature film, dir. Mariusz Grzegorzek - director of photography
- 2010 - General Nil feature film, dir. Ryszard Bugajski - director of promotional materials
- 2010 - Little Rose (aka. Rosebud, aka. Różyczka) feature film, dir. Jan Kidawa Błoński - director of promotional materials
- 2011 - In Treatment (aka. Bez tajemnic) HBO Poland TV Series, dir. Anna Kazejak-Dawid, Jacek Borcuch – director of promotional materials, author of trailers, TV spots, promotional films, and next-ons
- 2012 – Shameless, (aka. Bez wstydu) feature film, dir. Filip Marczewski. - director of photography
