= Wiktor Woroszylski =

Polish poet, writer, translator, and film critic (1927–1996)

- Born: 8 June 1927; Grodno
- Died: 13 September 1996 (aged 69); Warsaw
- Citizenship: Polish
- Occupations: Poet, writer, translator, film critic

Wiktor Woroszylski (8 June 1927 — 13 September 1996) was a poet, writer, translator and film critic.

== Biography ==
He was the son of Grzegorz Woroszylski, a physician, and Barbara née Grodzieńczyk. He attended high school in Grodno, where he stayed until the outbreak of World War II. During the Nazi occupation, he hid as an apprentice with a shoemaker. From November 1941, he was in the ghetto, from which he escaped. He worked odd jobs in a carpentry shop and on the farm. In March 1945, he came to Łódź as part of the repatriation operation.

He made his debut with the poem Przed Berlinem (Before Berlin), published in Głos Ludu, the journal of the Polish Workers' Party (25 April 1945), after which he started working as a reporter for Głos Ludu. Also in 1945 he joined Polish Workers' Party. After passing matura, he studied medicine for a year, and in 1946 he began studying Polish philology at the University of Łódź.

In 1949 he became a member of the Polish Writers' Union and traveled to the Soviet Union, including Siberia. In the years 1952—1956 he studied at the Moscow Institute of Literature. In 1966 he left Polish United Workers' Party.

== Prose ==
- 1956 Dziennik węgierski
- 1958 Okrutna gwiazda (short stories)
- 1960 I ty zostaniesz Indianinem
- 1962 Cyryl, gdzie jesteś? (novel for youth)
- 1963 Sny pod śniegiem. Opowieść o życiu Sałtykowa-Szczedrina (biographical story)
- 1965 Podmuch malowanego wiatru (novel for youth)
- 1973 Mniejszy szuka Dużego
- 1973 Życie Sergiusza Jesienina (co-authored with Elwira Watała)
- 1977 Literatura (novel)
- 1983 Don Kichot
- 1983 Kto zabił Puszkina? (biography)
- 2022 Historie i inne opowiadania (short stories, reedition of the 1987 book)

== Poetry ==
- 1949 Czuwającym w noc noworoczną
- 1949 Śmierci nie ma
- 1951 Wiosna sześciolatki (with Andrzej Mandalian and Andrzej Braun)
- 1955 Z rozmów
- Poem Świt nad Nową Hutą
- 1960 Wanderjahre
- 1962 Twój powszedni morderca
- 1964 Niezgoda na ukłon
- 1969 Przygoda w Babilonie
- 1970 Zagłada gatunków
- 1974 Wybór wierszy
- 1982 Jesteś i inne wiersze
- 1983 Lustro
- 1983 Dziennik internowania

== Other works ==
- Moi Moskale (translation of a selection of poems by Russian poets)
- Życie Majakowskiego (biography) — In English as The Life of Mayakovsky. New York: The Orion Press, 1970
- Marsz Sportowy (translation of Isaac Dunajewski's songs)
- Pozwólcie nam się cieszyć (selection of journalism)
- Dzienniki. Tom I–III, Ośrodek KARTA, Warszawa 2017–2019 (journals)
- Dużo śmiechu, trochę smutku to historia o mamutku (book for children illustrated by Józef Wilkoń, Spółdzielnia Wydawnicza „Czytelnik”, Warszawa 1961; Wytwórnia, Warszawa 2008)

== Film adaptations ==
His novels I ty zostaniesz Indianinem and Mniejszy szuka Dużego were made into films.

== Distinctions and awards ==
- State Artistic Award, 3rd class, on the occasion of the 22nd of July holiday, for the poem O Generale Świerczewskim and the volume of poems entitled Śmierci nie ma (There is no Death) (1950)
- Medal of the 10th Anniversary of People's Poland (19 January 1955)
- Officer's Cross of the Order of Polonia Restituta (11 July 1955)
- Kościelski Award (1965)

== Bibliography ==
- Woroszylski. Wieczór wspomnień. Iwona Smolka (edited by). Kraków: Baran i Suszczyński. 1997.
- Sawicka, Elżbieta (1996). "Ułożyć książkę, ułożyć życie. Wiktor Woroszylski (1927–1996)". Rzeczpospolita. 216.
