= Wiesław Zajączkowski =

Polish politician (1944–2026)

Member of the Sejm
- In office 18 June 1989 – 25 November 1991

Personal details
- Born: Wiesław Marian Zajączkowski; 11 February 1944 Łomazy, General Government
- Died: 21 February 2026 (aged 82)
- Party: OKP
- Education: University of Warsaw
- Occupation: Lawyer

Wiesław Marian Zajączkowski (11 February 1944 – 21 February 2026) was a Polish politician. A member of the Obywatelski Klub Parlamentarny, he served in the Sejm from 1989 to 1991.

Zajączkowski died on 21 February 2026, at the age of 82.
