= Alfred Miodowicz =

Polish politician (1929–2021)

Personal details
- Born: 28 June 1929 Poznań, Poland
- Died: 17 September 2021 (aged 92)

Alfred Miodowicz (28 June 1929 – 17 September 2021) was a Polish politician and trade union activist. He was born in Poznań. A member of communist Polish United Workers' Party, he held posts in the State National Council, Central Committee and Political Bureau. He was also the leader of the All-Poland Alliance of Trade Unions and took part in the Polish Round Table Agreement.
