= Zbigniew Doda (judge) =

Polish jurist and judge (1943–1999)

- Born: 23 August 1943; Sobienice Kiełczewskie
- Died: 4 February 1999 (aged 55)
- Occupations: Jurist, judge

Academic background
- Education: Jagiellonian University
- Doctoral advisor: Marian Cieślak

Zbigniew Stanisław Doda (23 August 1943 – 4 February 1999) was a jurist, judge of the Supreme Court of Poland from 1990 until 1999, professor at the Jagiellonian University.

== Biography ==
He was the son of Stanisław and Maria née Cierniak. In 1960 he passed matura in a high school in Brzesko.

In 1965 he graduated with a master's degree in law from the Jagiellonian University. In 1970 he obtained doctorate upon dissertation Rewizja nadzwyczajna (założenia konstrukcji i jej praktyczne implikacje w polskiej procedurze karnej) supervised by Marian Cieślak. He had also attended the seminar of Władysław Wolter. From 1963 to 1983 he was a member of the Polish United Workers' Party. In 1983 he obtained habilitation. From 1984 to 1987 he was a vice-dean of the Law Faculty of the Jagiellonian University.

In 1990 he was appointed a judge of the Supreme Court of Poland. In 1996, he was appointed President of the Criminal Chamber of the Supreme Court. He was a member of the Commission for Criminal Law Reform and co-authored parts of the Code of Criminal Procedure (1997) concerning appeal issues and process control. He supervised a doctoral dissertation of Zbigniew Wrona.

In 1964 he married Barbara Katarzyna née Wumrych (born 1945); their daughter Agnieszka was born in 1968. He died in 1999 and was buried at the Rakowicki Cemetery.

== Works ==
- Karnoprocesowe orzecznictwo Sądu Najwyższego w świetle doktryny. Zasadnicze kierunki. Warszawa. 1973. Co-authored with Marian Cieślak.
- Zażalenie w procesie karnym. Warszawa. 1985.
- Dowody w procesie karnym. Warszawa. 1995. Co-authored with Andrzej Gaberle.
- Kasacja w postępowaniu karnym. Komentarz. Warszawa. 1996. Co-authored with Jan Grajewski and Andrzej Murzynowski.

== Bibliography ==
- Woleński, Jan (1999). "Wspomnienie o Zbigniewie Dodzie". Prawo i Życie (4): 26.
- Zabłocki, Stanisław (1999). "Prof. dr hab. Zbigniew Doda. Prezes Izby Karnej SN (1943–1999)". Palestra (1/2): 172–174.
- "Zbigniew Doda". Więź (4): 214. 1999.
