= Andrzej Braun =

Polish poet, writer, journalist (1923–2008)

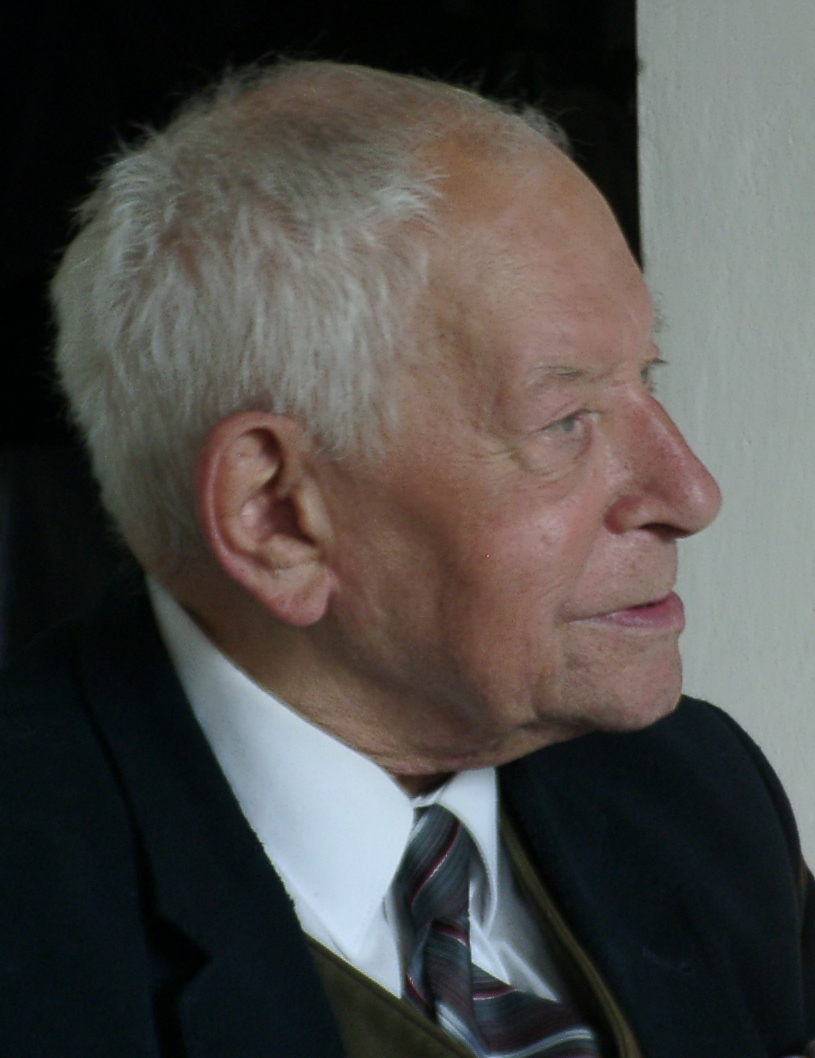
- Andrzej Braun
- Born: 19 August 1923
- Died: 9 November 2008 (aged 85)
- Citizenship: Polish
- Occupations: Poet, writer, journalist

Andrzej Braun (19 August 1923 — 9 November 2008) was a poet, writer and journalist.

Brother of Michalina Wisłocka, father of Ewa Braun. Member of the Polish United Workers' Party from 1947 until 1968.

== Poetry books ==
- Szramy
- Reportaż serdeczny
- Młodość
- Wiosna sześciolatki (1951, with Andrzej Mandalian and Wiktor Woroszylski)

== Novels ==
- Lewanty
- Zdobycie nieba
- Próżnia
- Próba ognia i wody
- Bunt
- Rzeczpospolita chwilowa
- Wallenrod
- Królestwo konieczności

== Short stories collections ==
- Zwycięzcy znad Tatu-Ho
- Noc długich noży
- Piekło wybrukowane i inne opowiadania

== Other written works ==
- W kraju odzyskanych przyjaciół
- Blask ciemności
- Samolotem i lektyką
- Śladami Conrada
- Kreacje Costaguany. Świat południowoamerykański u Conrada
- Piękna śmierć (short story from May 1946)

== Awards ==
- Medal of the 10th Anniversary of People's Poland (19 January 1955)
