= Andrzej Mandalian =

Polish poet (1926–2011)

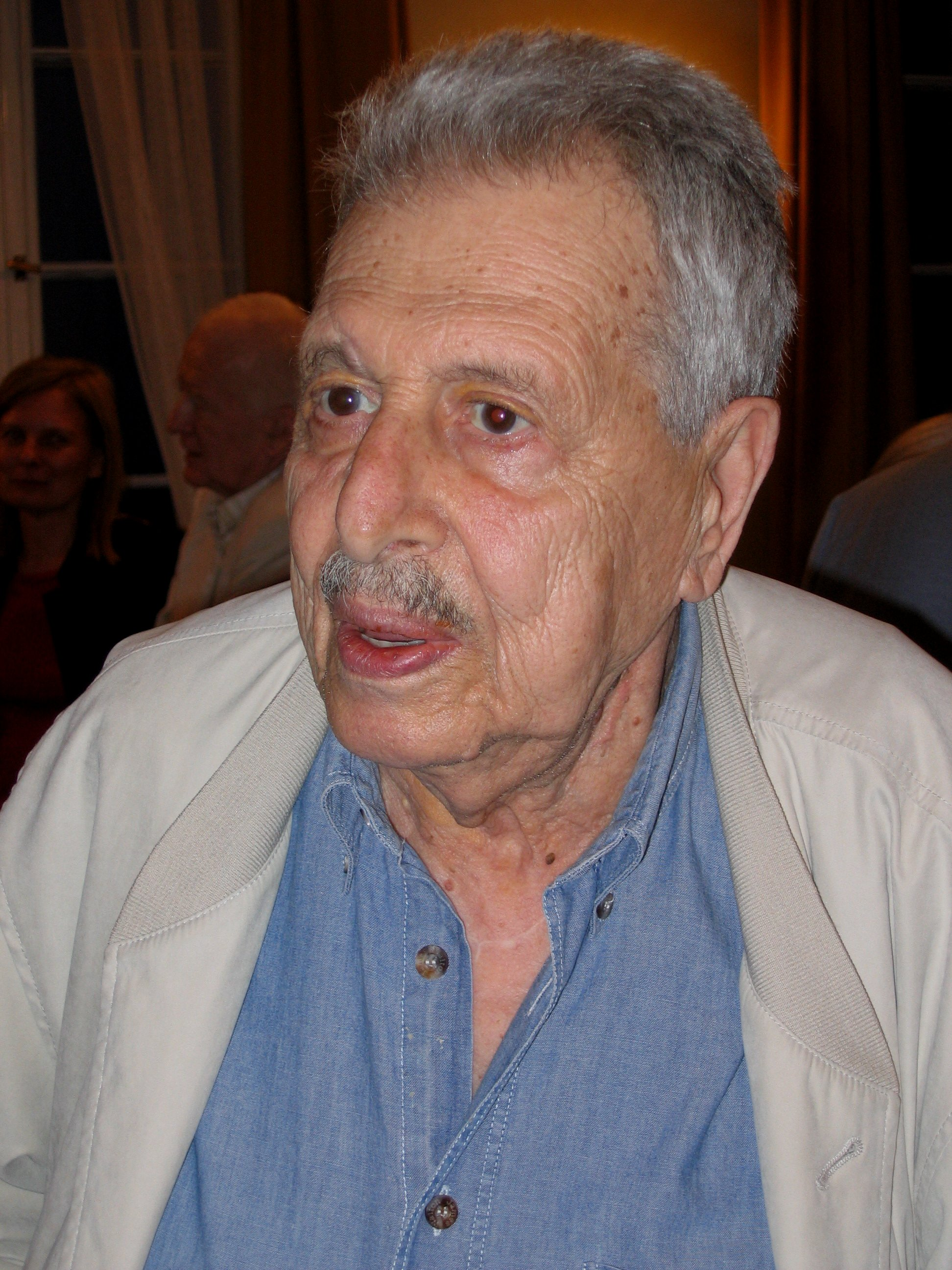
- Andrzej Mandalian, 2007
- Born: 6 December 1926
- Died: 24 November 2011 (aged 84)
- Citizenship: Polish
- Occupation: Poet

Andrzej Mandalian (6 December 1926 – 24 November 2011) was a poet and novelist.

== Biography ==
He was born into a family of Comintern activists who participated in the revolution in China. His mother was Teodora Feder, and his father was Armenian communist Tatheos Mandalián.

In 1953 he was a Polish United Workers' Party activist at the Polish Writers' Union main board.

== Poetry books ==
- Dzisiaj. Czytelnik. 1951.
- Wiosna sześciolatki. Książka i Wiedza. 1951. With Andrzej Braun and Wiktor Woroszylski.
- Słowa na co dzień. Czytelnik. 1953.
- Płomienie. Wydawnictwo MON. 1953.
- Czarny wiatr. Czytelnik. 1957.
- Krajobraz z kometą. Czytelnik. 1976.
- Egzorcyzmy. Czytelnik. 1981. ISBN 83-07-00409-8.
- Strzęp całunu. Czytelnik. 2003. ISBN 83-07-02917-1.
- Poemat odjazdu. Sic!. 2007. ISBN 978-83-60457-35-1.

== Short stories ==
- Na psa urok. Czytelnik. 1985. ISBN 83-07-01166-3.
- Czerwona orkiestra. Niezależna Oficyna Wydawnicza NOWA. 1993. ISBN 83-7054-062-7. Second edition: Sic, 2009, ISBN 978-83-60457-72-6.

== Novels ==
- Operacja Kartagina. Niezależna Oficyna Wydawnicza NOWA. 1985. Drugi obieg.

== Distinctions ==
- Medal of the 10th Anniversary of People's Poland (19 January 1955)
- Knight's Cross of the Order of Polonia Restituta (11 July 1955)
