= Theodor Albin Findeisen =

Theodor Albin Findeisen

Theodor Albin Findeisen (October 1, 1881, in Zeitz – March 3, 1936, at his country house in Rasberg near Zeitz) was a German double bass player, composer and teacher.

== Life ==
Little is known about Findeisen's life and work. His 5 volumes of studies helped in the development of the bass technique. His method was used with very positive results worldwide. His works Schule Der Lehrer des Kontrabass-Spieles and other practice literature such as his 25 technische Studien are still in use. He wrote solo literature and chamber music for double bass, which, however, has largely been forgotten.

Findeisen was the son of the businessman Theodor Findeisen and attended public school in Zeitz from 1888 to 1896. In Ronneburg he attended the music school until 1900 and then played in the Köthen city orchestra. In the following two years he received lessons from Hugo Keyl in Dresden and Franz Simandl in Vienna. He then did his military service from 1902 to 1904 with the music corps of the 96th Infantry Regiment in Gera. From 1904 to 1906 he worked with Oswald Schwabe in Leipzig, graduating with excellence. He then became solo bassist in Breslau, in 1907 he was second first double bass player in the Gewandhaus Orchestra in Leipzig, and in 1920 he was first double bass player there. In 1922 he also took on a teaching position at the Leipzig Conservatory. He held both positions until his early and sudden death in 1936. In between he was a member of the Bayreuth Festival Orchestra twice (1914 and 1924).

The last two books of his series of five focused on development of technique and musicality were published posthumously, and were presented by his successor Max Schultz. His last student before his untimely death in 1936 was Erich Hartmann. He left a bereaved wife and two bereaved children.

His first double bass concerto, opus 15, was republished in autumn 2006. A reprint of the work, the Karnevalsszenen opus 12 for double bass and orchestra is also planned.

== Work ==
=== Educational work ===
- Schule für Kontrabass, op. 17, Schott
- Der Lehrer des Kontrabass-Spieles – eine Grundschule für die höhere Lagen-, Bogen- und Finger-Technik, in 4 Bänden, Verlag Carl Merseburger, Leipzig; Neuauflage in fünf Bänden, Verlag Hofmeister
- 25 große technische Studien für Kontrabass durch alle Tonarten zur Einführung in die moderne Rhythmik, Harmonik und Vortragsweise, op. 14, 4 Bände; C.F. Schmidt, Heilbronn; International Music Company, New York
- Konzert-Etuden für Kontrabass, 20 Etuden von Storch und Rabe, bearbeitet von Findeisen; später veröffentlicht als „57 Studies for String Bass“, International Music Company, New York

=== Solo-pieces ===
- Nixenreigen-Fantasie, op. 9, für Kontrabass und Klavier, C.F. Schmidt, nach einem Gedicht von Ludwig Ankenbrand und einem Bild von einem im Wald spielenden Bassisten, der von Nymphen untanzt wird
- Karnevalsszenen, op. 12, für Kontrabass und Orchester, PRObass Musikverlag
- Konzert Nr. 1, op. 15 für Kontrabass mit großem Orchester, PRObass Musikverlag
- Elegie (Am Grabe des Freundes), op. 19, C.F. Schmidt
- Konzert Nr. 2, op. 25 in einem Satz für Kontrabass mit Kammerorchester, C.F. Schmidt

=== Other works for double bass with other instruments ===
- Romantische Suite, op. 10, für Kontrabass und Violine, PRObass Musikverlag
- J.S. Bach: 10 Inventionen, op. 16, bearbeitet für Kontrabass und Violine, C.F. Schmidt
- Quartettsuite, op. 26, für 4 Celli oder Kontrabässe, PRObass Musikverlag
- Kadenz zum Simandlkonzert, op. 34, C.F. Schmidt

=== Other works ===
- Männerchöre, op. 1-8 (Manuscript)
- Impromptu eroico, op. 13 für Klavier, C.F. Schmidt
- 5 Sehnsuchtslieder, op. 18, Dora Schellenberg C.F. Schmidt
- 4 Klavierfantasien, op. 20–24, nach Gerhart Hauptmann: Die versunkene Glocke, C.F. Schmidt
- Croquet Walzer, für Klavier "Den Damen des südvorstädischen "Schrebervereincroquetclub 1907" zugeeignet, C.F. Schmidt
