= Lech Szymańczyk =

Polish politician (born 1949)

member of Sejm 2005-2007
- In office 25 September 2005 – 2007

Personal details
- Born: 15 May 1949 (age 76)
- Party: Samoobrona

Lech Szymańczyk (born 15 May 1949 in Wola Młocka) is a Polish politician. He was elected to Sejm on 25 September 2005, getting 7393 votes in 16 Płock district as a candidate from Samoobrona Rzeczpospolitej Polskiej list.

He was also a member of Polish Sejm 1993-1997 and Polish Sejm 1997–2001.

== See also ==
- Members of Polish Sejm 2005-2007
