= Erich Hartmann (musician) =

German musician (1920–2020)

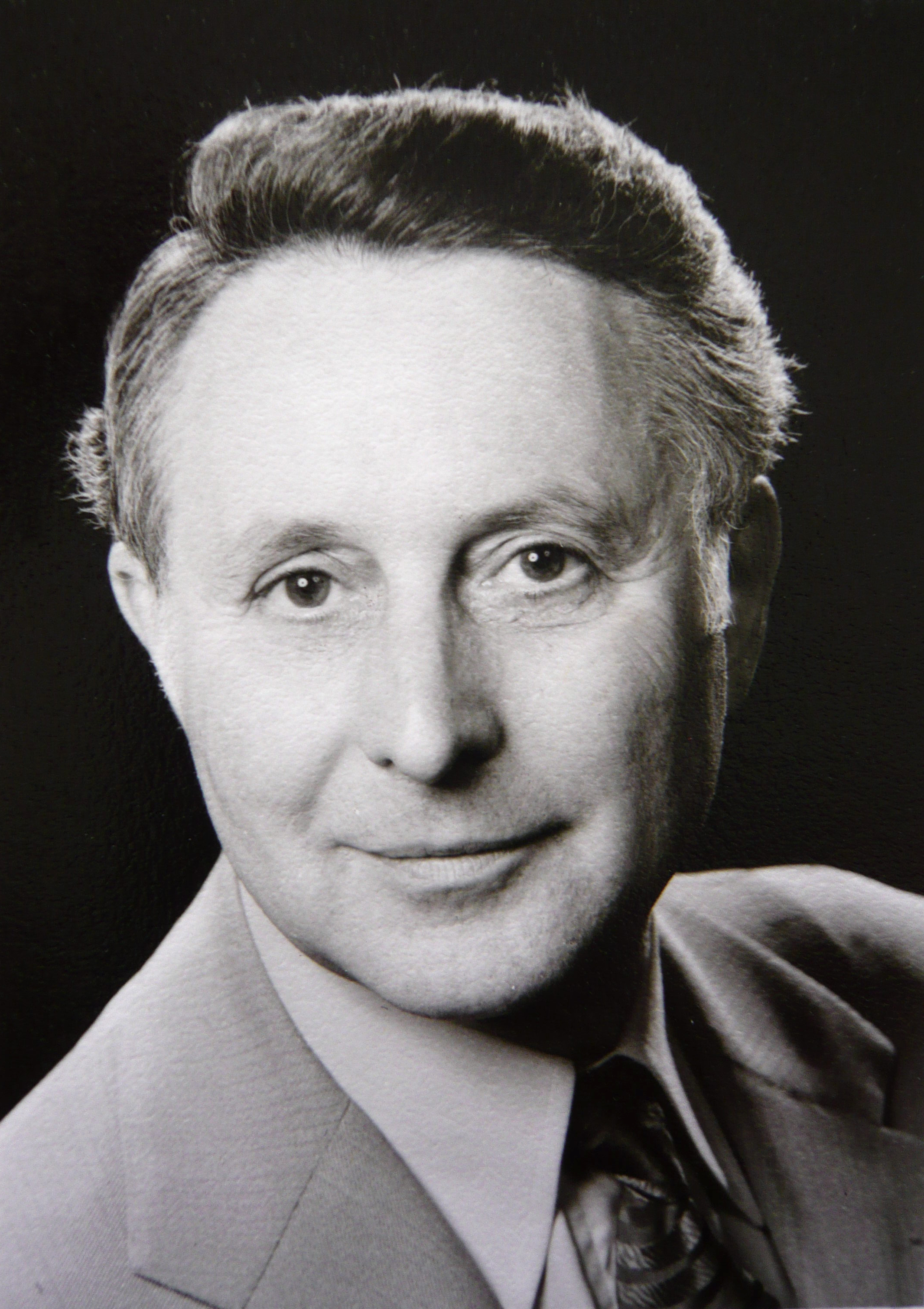
Erich Hartmann

Erich Hartmann (January 26, 1920, in Leipzig – July 6, 2020) was a German double bass player and composer. He was part of the contrabass section of the Berlin Philharmonic Orchestra.

== Life ==
Erich Hartmann was born on January 26, 1920, in Leipzig and lived in Berlin. The son of a piano maker, he grew up between the Conservatory of Music and St. Thomas Church in Leipzig. Hartmann studied double bass at the conservatory, now the Leipzig University of Music. There, he studied with Theodor Albin Findeisen, being his last student, and Max Schulz. At the same time he devoted himself to studying composition with Hermann Grabner. As a young music student he studied the compositions of Béla Bartók, Igor Stravinsky and Arnold Schoenberg.

His studies were interrupted due to labor service and military service in the Second World War. His military service ended due to an injury on September 4, 1942. In October 1942 he resumed studying music. After a successful audition with the Berliner Philharmoniker, he became a member of this orchestra on November 1, 1943. The heavy bombing raids on Berlin also destroyed the Berlin Philharmonic on Bernburger Strasse on January 30, 1944. Hartmann witnessed the events.

Erich Hartmann founded a double bass quartet in 1967, whose members were himself, Klaus Stoll, Wolfgang Kohly, Manfred Dupak, and later Rudolf Watzel and Friedrich Witt. With his compositions he committed to the double bass in order to give it broader recognition.

His works include Oktett (für Kontrabässe), composed for his colleagues of the Berlin Philharmonic Orchestra in 1972.

Hartmann was active in the Berlin Philharmonic Orchestra until January 31, 1985. He celebrated his 100th birthday on January 26, 2020. Erich Hartmann died on July 6, 2020.

== Awards ==
- 1973 Ring of Honor of the Berliner Philharmoniker
- 1985 recipient of the Hans von Bülow Medal.

== Selection of works ==
=== Compositions for bass ===
- Quartett für Kontrabass, 1967
- Duette 1–6 for 2 double basses, composed between November 9, 1965, and January 14, 1967; dedicated to Klaus Stoll, published by Friedrich Hofmeister Verlag, Leipzig
- Vier Stücke für drei Kontrabässe, February 9, 1968, world premiere at Kunstamt Berlin-Steglitz on June 2, 1970; recordings at RIAS on January 16, 1973, at SFB on June 25, 1980; soloists: Klaus Stoll, Wolfgang Kohly, EH, published by Verlag Bote & Bock, Berlin
- Französische Suite for 4 double basses from September 30, 1970, published by R. Ricordi and Edition Modern, Munich / Karlsruhe
- Drei Miniaturen für 3 Kontrabässe premiered on July 5, 1975; soloists: Klaus Stoll, EH, Wolfgang Kohly. Recorded at the SFB on March 15, 1977, published by Ries & Erler, Berlin
- Oktett für Kontrabässe, 1972
- Scherzo (Persiflage) for 3 double basses, world premiere at the British Center Berlin on January 17, 1979; soloists as under No. 3, published by the book and music publisher Werner Feja, Berlin
- Quartett 80 for 4 double basses from April 17, 1980
- Präludium für 4 Kontrabässe for 4 double basses The piece was composed in Japan during an orchestral tour. Recording of sound and film in the Salzburg Festival Hall on June 4, 1981; Soloists: Friedrich Witt, Klaus Stoll, EH and Wolfgang Kohly, published by Ries & Erler Verlag, Berlin
- Sieben Aphorismen for 2 double basses from July 1, 1981, published by Ries & Erler, Berlin
- Rhapsodie für Solo-Kontrabass for double bass solo, world premiere in Charlottenburg Palace (oak gallery) on March 14, 1985; Soloist Norbert Duka, also dedicatee, published by Verlag Bote & Bock, Berlin
- Der Wal auf Wanderung for solo double bass from June 2, 1995, published by the book and music publisher Werner Feja, Berlin
- Zwei Duos for 2 double basses (June 1, 2007) and Largo for 2 double basses with 4 versions (January 24, 2008) for Joachim Bentrup
- Bearbeitung des Ave Verum by Mozart for 4 double basses. With the soloists (as under No. 9); Photo taken by Teldec, December 1978
- Schatzwalzer from The Gypsy Baron by Johann Strauss; arranged for eight double basses, December 29, 1977, published by Ries & Erler, Berlin and published by R.Ricordi and Edition Modern, Munich / Karlsruhe
- Arrangement of the Johann Strauss waltz "An der schönen Blauen Donau" for eight double basses, 1975 – see above

=== Compositions for double bass and piano ===
- Spanische Serenade for double bass and piano on December 9, 1970
- Sonatine for double bass and piano from February 6, 1972; Recording at WDR Cologne on June 9, 1980; Soloists: Wolfgang Güttler and Manfred Theilen (piano); both also dedicators, published by R.Ricordi and Edition Modern, Munich / Karlsruhe
- Impressionen in G for double bass and piano; First performed at Wigmore Hall, London on March 9, 1974; Klaus Stoll (double bass) and EH (piano)
- Capriccio for double bass and piano; First performance at the Royal Northern College of Music, Manchester on June 16, 1976, and on June 17, 1976, at Jubilee Hall, Aldeburgh Festival / Suffolk; Klaus Stoll (double bass) and EH (piano); BBC recording
- Salonstücke for double bass and piano dated August 11, 1989, published by Low Note Verlag, Aachen
- Impressionen – Seven easy pieces for double bass and piano, published by R.Ricordi and Edition Modern, Munich / Karlsruhe

=== Compositions for bass and other string instruments ===
- Partita for viola and double bass, February 28, 1982
- Duo for violoncello and double bass, 1982
- Großes Trio for violin, violoncello and double bass from March 1985; World premiere on September 9, 1998, by the Hoyer Trio in the town hall of Berlin-Pankow; Soloists: Klaus Hoyer (violin), Uta Lindemann (violoncello), Karsten Lauke (double bass), published by the book and music publisher Werner Feja, Berlin
- Rêverie pour alto, violoncelle et contrabasse – Homage to Serge Koussevitzky; First performance at the University of Music Freiburg on November 8, 1986; * Soloists: Andreas Kirchner (viola), Gregor Horsch (cello), Annette Schilli (double bass), published by Verlag Bote & Bock, Berlin
- Zweites Trio for violin, violoncello and double bass from November 24, 1998; First performance in the Brandenburger Theater, Brandenburg an der Havel on February 25, 2001, by the Hoyer Trio

=== Compositions for bass, strings and other instruments ===
- Drei Studien for 2 double basses, harp, timpani and percussion; First performance at RIAS on June 21, 1969; Conductor Werner Thärichen, Klaus Stoll (1.Kb), Wolfgang Kohly (2.Kb), Fritz Helmis (harp), Gerassimo Avgerinos (timpani), published by Ries & Erler, Berlin
- Dialoge for 2 double basses, flute and harpsichord; First performance in the British Center Berlin on September 17, 1970; Soloists: EH, Klaus Stoll, Johanna Kassner (flute) and Helge Jörns (harpsichord), published by Verlag Bote & Bock, Berlin
- Divertimento for solo double bass, strings, harp, timpani and percussion; World premiere at the Philharmonie Berlin on October 24, 1983; Conductor Martin Fischer-Dieskau, soloist Friedrich Witt

=== Compositions for winds ===
- Sieben Stücke for oboe d'amore, cor anglais and bassoon; Recorded in the SFB on March 2, 1978; Soloists: Burkhard Rohde (oboe d'amore), Gerhard Stempnik (English horn) and Günter Piesk (bassoon), published by Ries & Erler, Berlin
- Zwölf Stücke for Bass Clarinet Solo; dedicated to Renate Rusche; First performance on January 25, 1985, in the station RIAS, published by the book and music publisher Werner Feja, Berlin
- Quintett for bassoons; First performance on July 7, 1986, in the Joachimthalschen Gymnasium, Berlin-Wilmersdorf; Mannheim Rosengarten, Stamnitz-Saal, January 22, 1990; and at SWF Kaiserslautern on February 9, 1992; Soloists: Markus Tukkanen, Derek Krüger, Stefan Rocke, Norbert Mohren and Ekkehart Oehme (also contrabassoon), published by the book and music publisher Werner Feja, Berlin
- Sinfonia piccola for 7 bassoons and double bassoon from June 5, 1993, published by the book and music publisher Werner Feja, Berlin

=== Compositions for other instruments ===
- Viola-Sonata with piano accompaniment from March 8, 1989, for Ulrich Fritze
