= All-Poland Alliance of Trade Unions =

Alliance of worker's unions

OPZZ
- All-Poland Alliance of Trade Unions
- Ogólnopolskie Porozumienie Związków Zawodowych
- Founded: November 24, 1984
- Location: Poland
- Members: 793,000 (2012)
- Political alignment: Centre-left to left-wing
- Key people: Piotr Ostrowski, President
- Affiliations: ETUC ITUC
- Website: opzz.org.pl

The All-Poland Alliance of Trade Unions (Polish: Ogólnopolskie Porozumienie Związków Zawodowych, OPZZ) is a national trade union center founded in 1984.

== History ==
Following the decisions of the Polish government declaring the Solidarity trade union illegal, the OPZZ was created on 24 November 1984 according to the 1982 trade union act which made trade union pluralism illegal. The OPZZ inherited all of Solidarity's property, and also that of the former Association of Trade Unions. It was part of the pro-government Patriotic Movement for National Revival (Patriotyczny Ruch Odrodzenia Narodowego - PRON). In 1985 it joined the World Federation of Trade Unions (WFTU). Until 1990 the OPZZ was tied closely to the Polish United Workers' Party (PZPR). Following the end of communist rule in Poland the federation aligned with various post-communist and social-democratic parties (e.g. Democratic Left Alliance, SLD).

In 2006 the OPZZ affiliated to the European Trade Union Confederation and the International Trade Union Confederation.

In the summer of 2006, Roman Giertych, the Deputy Prime Minister of the Republic of Poland and a stalwart of the ultra-right-wing and chauvinistic League of Polish Families, voiced his support for the confiscation of OPZZ property and the dissolution of the organization, branding it a mouthpiece of the Social-Democratic Union (SLD) and the heir of the Communist PZPR.

== Activities ==
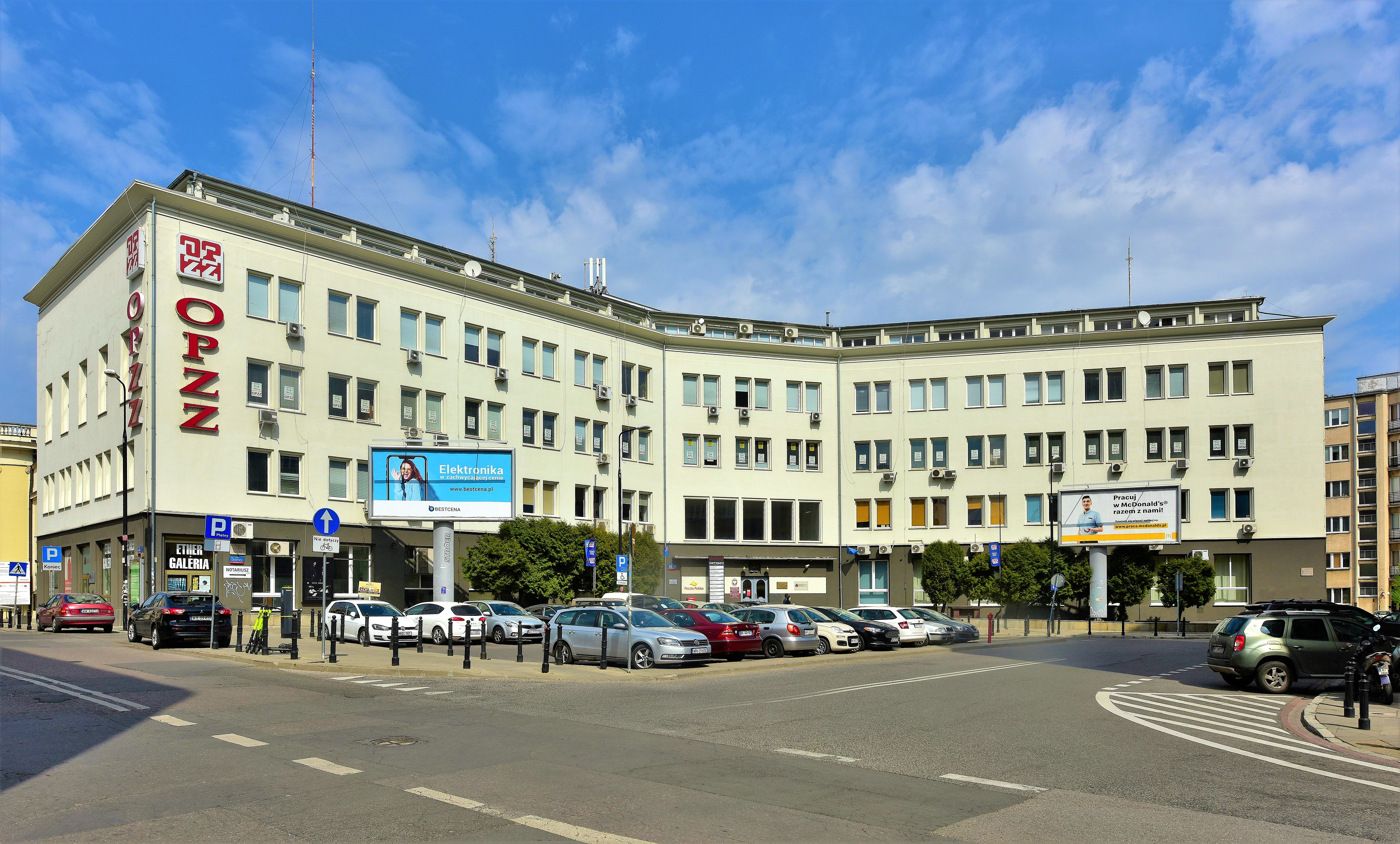
Seat All-Poland Alliance of Trade Unions on Kopernik Street (Ulica Kopernika) in Warsaw, Poland

The mission of OPZZ is stated as the defence of social and worker's right of the trade unions. OPZZ has strongly supported the demands of state owned industry sector.

The OPZZ is governed by Congress (Kongres), Council (Rada) and Presidium (Prezydium).

OPZZ associates 90 nationwide trade union organisations (uniform trade unions and federations) grouped in 12 branches:

1. Raw materials and power industry
2. Manufacturing
3. Education, science and culture
4. Health care and social insurance
5. Agriculture and food economy
6. Construction, forestry, wood industry, environment protection and water economy
7. Municipal economy
8. Co-operatives
9. Trade and services
10. Transport and maritime economy
11. Railways
12. Communication

OPZZ also has its internal territorial structures, with territorial range corresponding to the administrative division of the country. These are voivodship (regional) councils (16) and powiat (district) councils (240).

In 2013, the OPZZ was estimated to have 500,000 members.

== Presidents of OPZZ ==
- Alfred Miodowicz (1984 – 1991)
- Ewa Spychalska (1991 – 1996)
- Józef Wiaderny (1996 – 2002)
- Maciej Manicki (2002 – 2004)
- Jan Guz (2004 – 2019)
- Andrzej Radzikowski (2019 – 2022)
- Piotr Ostrowski (since 2022)
