= Norbert Aleksiewicz =

Polish politician

Norbert Antoni Aleksiewicz (25 November 1948 – 19 November 1994) was a Polish politician and member of the Ninth Term of the People's Republic of Poland sejm from 13 October 1985 to 3 June 1989 on behalf of the Polish United Workers' Party.

Born in Klukowo near Złotów, Aleksiewicz graduated from the Agricultural Academy in Szczecin in 1973 and became a farmer in 1974, owning a 35-hectare farm near the Złotów. He was active in the agricultural cooperative, and for many years was chairman of Farmers' Cooperatives in Złotów, then chairman of the Board cooperative bank in Złotów. From 1979 to 1989, he was President of the General Council of the National Union of Farmers, Circles and Agricultural Organizations. He was also active in youth organizations (Rural Youth Association, Polish Students' Association, Socialist Union of Rural Youth, Polish Socialist Youth Union etc.). He was also a member of the National Council Patriotic Movement for National Rebirth. He was elected to the Provincial Committee of the Communist Party in Piła.

Aleksiewicz was the elected to the council in Złotów and later the collegial advisory body for the President of the Council of State Polish People's Republic. He was active in the Committee on Agriculture, Forestry and Food Economy.

Aleksiewicz was awarded a Bronze and Gold Cross of Merit.

== See also ==
- List of Polish United Workers' Party members
