= Little Rose =

2010 Polish drama film

- Polish film poster
- Directed by: Jan Kidawa-Błoński
- Starring: Andrzej Seweryn; Magdalena Boczarska; Robert Więckiewicz
- Music by: Michał Lorenc
- Release date: 12 March 2010
- Running time: 118 minutes
- Country: Poland
- Language: Polish
- Box office: $239,380

Little Rose (Polish: Różyczka) is a 2010 Polish drama film directed by Jan Kidawa-Błoński. The lead actress Magdalena Boczarska received the IFFI Best Actor Award (Female): Silver Peacock Award at the 41st International Film Festival of India.

== Plot ==
The film is set in 1967 to 1968. The attractive Kamila Sakowicz (Magdalena Boczarska) and Roman Rożek (Robert Więckiewicz) are lovers. At first Kamila does not know that Roman is an officer in the Polish state security services. After some time, he invites her into his apartment. After several nights of passion Roman asks Kamila for a favor. Kamila is to approach the well-known author and literature professor Adam Warczewski (Andrzej Seweryn) and report on his views and contacts. Kamila selects the pseudonym Różyczka (little rose). Roman claims Warczewski is a Zionist counter-revolutionary hiding his Jewish name Wajner behind the Polish name Warczewski.

Kamila approaches the professor who invites her to his home and introduces her to classical music and Polish exile literature. The professor is a widower and a single father of a young daughter. The relationship between Kamila and Warczewskis family gets closer and the reports for the state security more detailed and interesting. Finally, the professor and Kamila become lovers. Roman continues to receive Kamila's reports, but his jealousy is as fierce as his professional ambition. When the Polish government suspends a theater play on account of its veiled anti-Soviet overtones, Warczewski calls a meeting of the PEN Club to protest. Kamila is the secretary of the meeting, and she forwards the minutes to the security services along with a notice putting an end to her collaboration with the secret services. She wants to marry the professor.

Roman is desperate in his jealousy and informs Warczewski about Kamila's collaboration with the secret services. After the suppression of student riots Władysław Gomułka seizes upon Warczewski as an example of Jewish anti-socialist elements in Polish society. The anti-Semitic campaign that follows forces 15,000 Poles of Jewish descent to leave Poland. At the same time, however, Rożek, whose original Jewish name was "Rosen", is unmasked and dismissed from the security services. He also has to leave the country. In a final act of jealousy, he kills the professor.

== Cast ==
- Andrzej Seweryn – Adam Warczewski
- Magdalena Boczarska – Kamila Sakowicz 'Różyczka'
- Robert Więckiewicz – Roman Rożek
- Jan Frycz – Wasiak
- Jacek Braciak – SB officer
- Grażyna Szapołowska – Roma Żarska, Warczewski's friend
