= Jerzy Urban =

Polish journalist, politician and propagandist (1933–2022)

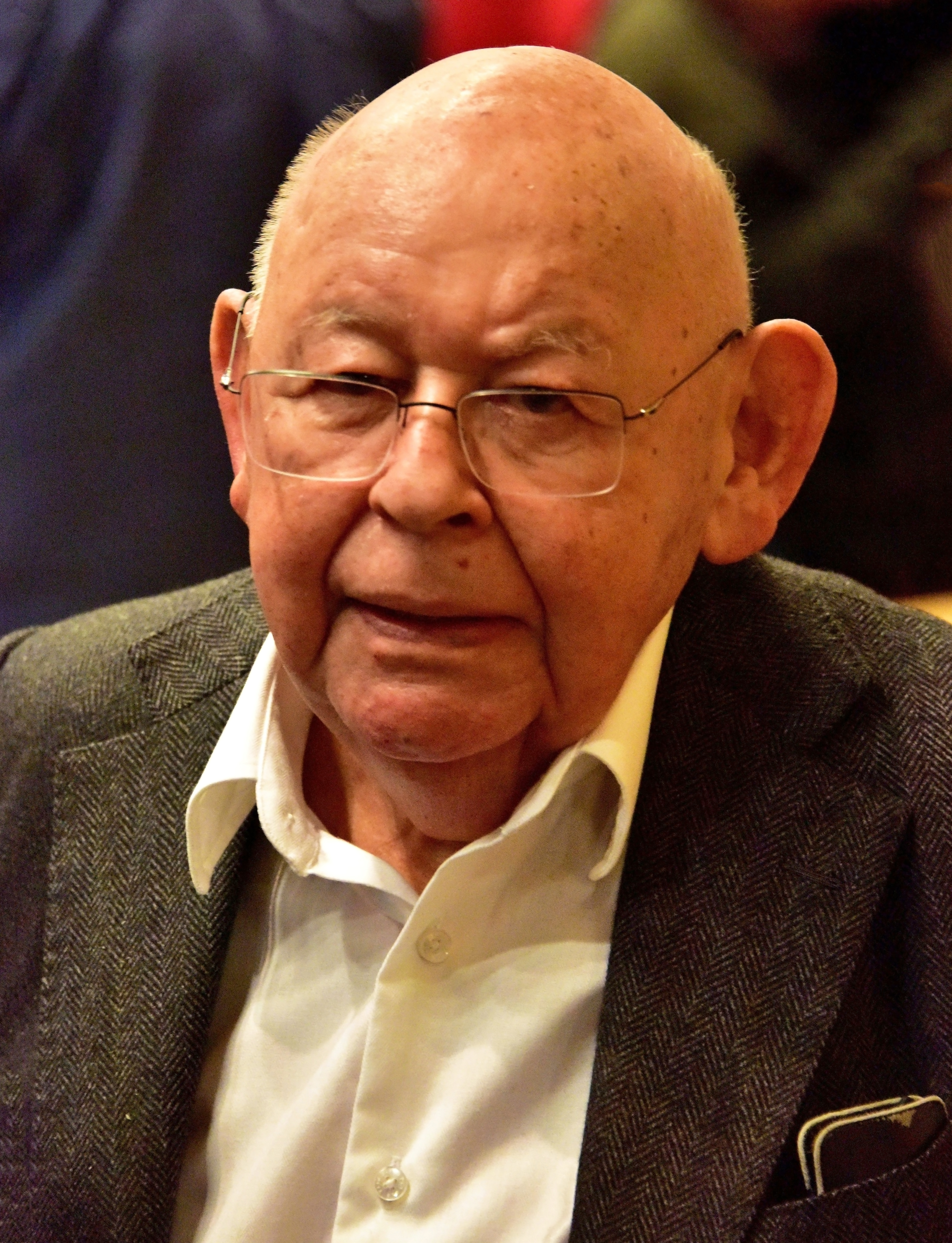
- Jerzy Urban (2019)
- Born: Jerzy Urbach; 3 August 1933; Łódź, Poland
- Died: 3 October 2022 (aged 89); Konstancin-Jeziorna, Poland
- Other names: Jerzy Kibic, Jan Rem, Jerzy Urbach
- Occupations: Journalist, writer, politician
- Known for: journalism, online streaming
- Political party: Polish United Workers' Party (1989–1990), Social Democracy of the Republic of Poland (1990–1999), Democratic Left Alliance (1999–2004)

Signature
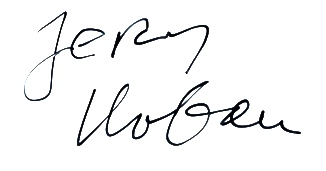

Jerzy Urban (born Jerzy Urbach, 3 August 1933 – 3 October 2022) was a Polish journalist, commentator, writer and politician, best known as the founder and editor-in-chief of the weekly magazine Nie. From 1981 to 1989 he was the Press Secretary of the Polish government under the Polish People's Republic, and the Head of the Polish Radio and Television Committee in 1989.

An anticlerical and socialist throughout his life, he frequently was the centre of numerous controversies due to his comments and political views resulting in support of Polish government; on the other hand, he was an intelligent and uncompromising satirist, writer and journalist, which results in a complex legacy of his life.

== Biography ==
=== Before 1989 ===
Urban was born into an assimilated Jewish family in Łódź. His father, Jan Urbach, was an activist of Polish Socialist Party and the General Jewish Labour Bund in Poland. In 1939, they relocated to the city of Lwów (Lemberg, now Lviv). Following the outbreak of the Second World War and the German–Soviet occupation of Poland, a Soviet official mistook the last two letters of the family surname and incorrectly transcribed it as "Urban". (Note: The letters ch - х in Russian, were transcribed as н - corresponding to the Latin n.) His parents later refrained from returning to the original spelling.

Urban reportedly attended 17 different primary and high schools. He completed his senior high school exams as an external student. He studied in two faculties of the University of Warsaw and was expelled from both. He started his journalistic career with the journal Nowa Wieś.

From 1955 to 1957, he was a journalist - reporter and commentator - for the weekly Po prostu, which started during the rehabilitation of Władysław Gomułka, who became leader of Polish United Workers' Party. However, the newspaper was closed by the personal initiative of Gomułka, which symbolised the end of the thaw which started under Gomułka. Urban was officially banned from publishing under his own name. From 1961, he worked for the weekly Polityka, continuing his opinion pieces under pseudonyms. He was eventually totally forbidden from carrying out any journalistic activities. This ban continued until Gomułka lost power as party leader.

Despite his critical attitude towards Edward Gierek's rule, he was an opponent of the Solidarity movement in 1980 and often criticized its leaders (including Lech Wałęsa). From 1981 to 1989, he was the Press Secretary and spokesman for the Council of Ministers and the Polish government. He created the tradition of weekly press conferences, transmitted by Polish television and attended by both Polish and foreign journalists. In September 1984, during the month before the death of the priest Jerzy Popiełuszko, he wrote a column criticizing the priest as an anti-socialist troublemaker.

In 1986 Urban published a media story on how the United States had betrayed the Solidarity movement. He met with a Washington Post reporter and told him that a Polish spy for the CIA, who was later identified as Ryszard Kukliński, was aware of the plan to install martial law in 1981 and had passed that information on to the United States government. "The US administration could have publicly revealed these plans to the world and warned Solidarity," Urban said, "Had it done so, the implementation of martial law would have been impossible." At press conference Urban alleged that "Washington ... did not warn its allies. It did not boast of its agent as it customarily does." According to Urban, the Reagan administration had "lied to its own people and to its friends in Poland," when it denied having prior knowledge of martial law.

=== After 1989 ===
Urban ran for office as an independent during the semi-free elections in 1989 (he was never a member of the Polish United Workers' Party PZPR). He suffered a landslide defeat and since then gave up attempts to actively participate in politics.

In 1990 he established Nie, a satirical newspaper, which often uses profanity. He subsequently served as its chief editor.

==== Court case for offence to John-Paul II ====
In 2002, Urban was charged with offence against the head of the Vatican state, Pope John Paul II, due to the publication in Nie of the article on Pope's health.

The Youth Forum of the political party PiS and the Media Ethics Council took him to court. In court, Magdalena Bajer, the leader of the Media Ethics Council, testified as a witness that Urban "brutally mocked the suffering of a man who was a head of state". The court case was considered a precedent. Urban pleaded not guilty.

Urban was defended by the International Press Institute in Vienna. In turn, a specialist in church law, priest Prof. Florian Lempa stated that Urban's action did not satisfy the definition of the crime, since a head of state is only protected when he is present on Polish territory, and the article was published before the Pope arrived in Poland. Moreover, Urban "had the right to his point of view", and "opinion is admissible". He added that the article was aimed at people who try to profit from the Pope, rather than at him personally.

The prosecutor asked for a sentence of ten months' imprisonment suspended over three years and a fine of 20 thousand zlotys (about €5,000). On 5 January 2005, the court convicted Urban and fined him 20,000 zlotys. The court argued, "Jerzy Urban intentionally caused a scandal by publishing an article about John Paul II at the moment when the Pope came to Poland". The court stressed that permitted criticism does not have to be pleasant, but it cannot be insulting.

==== Death ====
Jerzy Urban died in Konstancin-Jeziorna on 3 October 2022 at the age of 89. He was buried at the Powązki Military Cemetery, Warsaw on 11 October 2022.

== Personal life and political beliefs ==
Urban married three times. He had one daughter. He described himself as an atheist, and frequently criticised organised religion, especially the Roman Catholic Church in Poland.

He was a dedicated socialist throughout his life; describing the Solidarność movement as the "worst thing to happen to Poland" and maintained this stance even after Polish government was overthrown during 1989 revolutions.

== Awards and decorations ==
- Officer's Cross of the Order of Polonia Restituta
- Gold Cross of Merit
- Order of the Banner of Labour, second class
- Order of Cyril and Methodius (Bulgaria)

== See also ==
- List of Polish United Workers' Party members
