= Władysław Findeisen =

Polish engineer, academic and politician (1926–2023)

- Born: 28 January 1926; Poznań, Poland
- Died: 7 March 2023 (aged 97); Warsaw, Poland

Władysław Findeisen (28 January 1926 – 7 March 2023) was a Polish engineer, academic and politician.

== Life and career ==
Born in Poznań, the son of two engineers, during World War II Findeisen took part in the Warsaw Uprising, being captured by Nazis and being imprisoned in a war camp in Germany. In 1949, he graduated in Electrical Engineering at the Warsaw University of Technology, where he later became professor and where he co-founded the Department of Automatic Control and Telemechanics (later renamed as Institute of Automatic Control), that he headed from 1955 to 1981. He served as rector of the university from 1981 to 1985, when he was dismissed for political reasons. A member of the Solidarity movement and a supporter of Lech Wałęsa, he was senator from 1989 to 1993.

The main object of Findeisen's studies was the theory and technology of automatic control, and among other things with his team he developed a system of hierarchical steady-state control used in the chemical industry. He authored or co-authored about 80 scientific articles and 6 books.

During his career Findeisen received various honours and accolades, notably the Order of the White Eagle, the Commander's Cross of the Order of Polonia Restituta, the Warsaw Uprising Cross and the Honorary Citizenship of Warsaw. He died in Warsaw on 7 March 2023, at the age of 97.
