= Momentum Institut =

Austria-based think tank

Momentum Institut – Verein für sozialen Fortschritt
- Established: 2019
- Key people: Barbara Blaha; Leonhard Dobusch
- Location: Vienna
- Website: momentum-institut.at

The Momentum Institut is a trade union-affiliated Austrian think tank that aims to develop and disseminate proposals for a more sustainable and fair society. The association's political stance can be classified as left-wing.

== Positioning ==
The Momentum Institute wants to distinguishes itself from other Austrian think tanks by defining itself as a "think tank for the many" with an "Agenda for You and Me".

== Financing ==
The institute emerged from the annual scientific congress Momentum and described itself as being financed solely by donations and crowdfunding. At the beginning of 2022, the institute's financing came under media scrutiny following a parliamentary inquiry by NEOS MP Gerald Loacker. The issue of the institute's subsidisation by means of mandatory contributions from the Arbeitskammer (Chamber of Labour, AK), which provided Momentum with a total of €900,000 in funding in 2020 out of a total budget of €1.6 million, became a topic of discussion. The amount was also reported in the AK's activity report at the time. According to the institute's annual report, other donors included billionaire and entrepreneur Patricia Kahane, millionaire heiress Marlene Engelhorn, and the ÖGB's "Solidarität Privatstiftung" (Solidarity Private Foundation). The inquiry sparked a discussion about the influence of funding on think tanks such as Momentum or the business-oriented Agenda Austria and non-university research institutes such as WIFO, IHS, and wiiw.

== Online medium Moment ==
The editorial guidelines of the online medium moment.at are intended to disseminate the content objectives developed by the Momentum Institut. Editorial director Tom Schaffer described the editorial policy as follows:

"We are progressive. There are certainly left-wing attitudes in many respects, but there are also many liberal elements [...] We call it progressive – partly because the word is not as loaded as 'left-wing'. It also means you're not immediately pigeonholed. For many people, 'left-wing' also means a more rigid view of the world than we actually want to convey."

== Parlagram tool ==
In 2019, the institute developed the Parlagram tool, based on a project by the newspaper Die Zeit, which made all speeches in German parliament since 1949 available for graphical analysis. Parlagram uses open data to make written stenographic transcripts of the plenary sessions of the Austrian National Council from 1996 to 2018 systematically searchable. Such tools make it possible to track how political debates and the associated choice of words have changed.
