= Kazimierz Łaski =

Polish-Austrian economist (1921–2015)

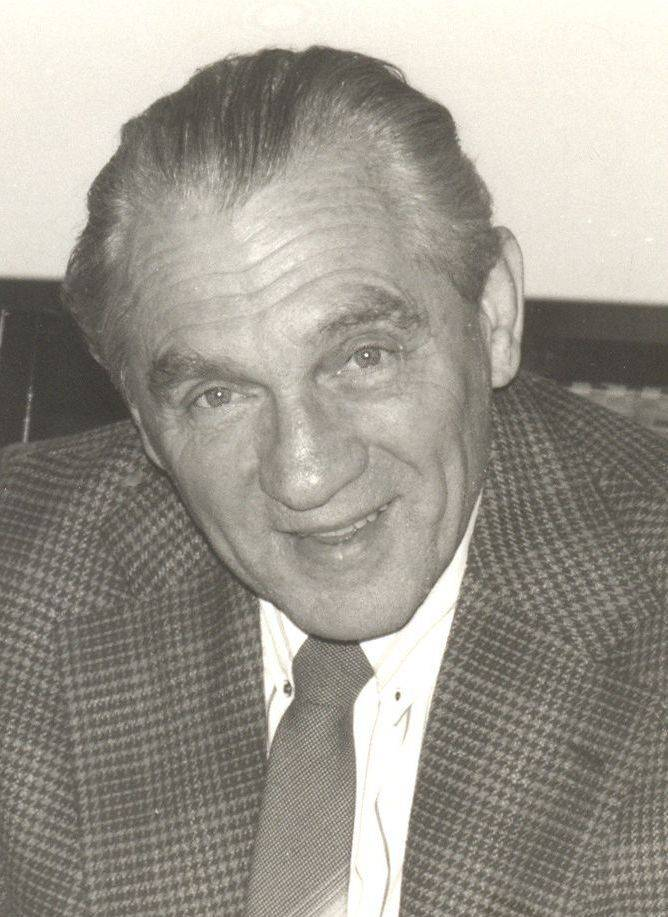
- Kazimierz Łaski, December 1990
- Born: Hendel Cygler; December 15, 1921; Częstochowa, Poland
- Died: October 20, 2015 (aged 93)

Academic work
- School or tradition: Post-Keynesian economics
- Institutions: The Vienna Institute for International Economic Studies (wiiw)

Kazimierz Łaski (December 15, 1921 – October 20, 2015) was a Polish-Austrian economist. During the antisemitic purge of 1968 Łaski had to leave Poland and moved to Austria, where he worked for the rest of his life and was widely recognized as a major contributor to Post-Keynesian economics.

== Life and career ==
Kazimierz Łaski was born as Hendel Cygler in Częstochowa, Poland. As a Jew in Nazi-occupied Poland, in 1943 he obtained identity documents with a Polish name that he later kept.

During World War II, Łaski was a member of Gwardia Ludowa, a Polish communist partizan formation, and a participant of the underground resistance. He was wounded during the Warsaw Uprising. This involvement led him to the Polish People's Army and then to the Stalinist Ministry of Public Security. As an officer of high abilities, he was soon designated for an academic career.

Łaski studied political economy at the Academy of Political Sciences (Akademia Nauk Politycznych) from 1945, obtaining a master's degree (magisterium) in 1948, and at the University for Planning and Statistics (Szkoła Główna Planowania i Statystyki – SGPiS) in Warsaw. He did his doctoral studies at the Institute for Social Sciences at the Central Committee of the Polish United Workers' Party (Instytut Nauk Społecznych przy KC PZPR – INS), earning his doctorate in 1954 with a dissertation on Accumulation and consumption during the industrialization of the Polish People's Republic. Łaski started work at the SGPiS in 1949 as assistant to Professor Włodzimierz Brus.

In 1955 he became assistant professor and in 1960 associate professor at the Chair of Political Economy of the Faculty for Foreign Trade at the SGPiS. In this capacity he supervised research and teaching and invited Michał Kalecki, one of the most prominent Polish economists, to give courses at the SGPiS. At the same time, Łaski lectured at the INS and, after its closure, at the University for Social Sciences at the Central Committee of the Polish United Workers' Party (Wyższa Szkoła Nauk Społecznych przy KC PZPR – WSNS). In 1957–60, Łaski was deputy-dean and then dean of the Faculty of Economics of Production, and in 1961–63 deputy chancellor of the SGPiS in charge of teaching and research. In 1961–66, he served as a member of the executive committee of the Higher Education Council at the Ministry of Higher Education. He was one of the founders of the Higher Course in Planning for Economists from Developing Countries, chaired its scientific council and thereafter was deputy head of the course in 1963–68. In 1965–68, Łaski was president of the Warsaw Chapter of the Polish Economic Society.

In 1960, Łaski held a Ford scholarship at the Institut de sciences économiques appliquées (with Professor François Perroux) in Paris. In 1964, he was visiting professor at the Institute for Higher Studies and Scientific Research (IHS) in Vienna, and during the academic year 1966–67 Directeur d'études à titre étrangère at the Ecole pratique des hautes études, Sorbonne in Paris.

The "golden age" of the Polish school of economics was interrupted by the Polish political crisis of 1968. In the course of the antisemitic and anti-intellectual campaign (about 15,000 Polish citizens of Jewish origin were pressured to emigrate from the Polish People's Republic), students and colleagues of Michał Kalecki were subject to harsh, politically motivated attacks. In November 1968, Łaski emigrated from Poland and settled in Austria. He initially (1969–71) worked as a research fellow at the Austrian Institute of Economic Research (WIFO) in the Department for International Comparative Economics, and as visiting professor at the Université catholique de Louvain in 1970. Łaski's work at the WIFO entailed an intensive collaboration and exchange i.a. with the Austrian economists Kurt W. Rothschild and Josef Steindl and the Czech-Austrian economist Friedrich Levcik. In 1971, Łaski was appointed full professor at the Johannes Kepler University of Linz and started work as research associate at The Vienna Institute for International Economic Studies (wiiw)). In 1990 Łaski also served as an official advisor to the acting Polish minister Jerzy Osiatyński, head of the Central Planning Office. In 1991, Łaski retired from the Johannes Kepler University as professor emeritus and until 1996 was research director at the wiiw. In 1994–95 Łaski was also a fellow at the Institute for Advanced Study, Berlin. From 1996, Kazimierz Łaski worked as research associate at the wiiw.

== Professional activity ==
=== Early period at the INS and the SGPiS (1945–61) ===
Kazimierz Łaski studied at a time when Marxian economics enjoyed administrative hegemony at Polish universities. In an interview, he tells about the early stages of his scientific research: "First I was, as most Polish economists in the early 1950s, a dogmatic Marxist. Actually, I only engaged in economics when I met Michał Kalecki. In between, I evolved from a dogmatic to a critical Marxist and then turned away from it completely." During his doctoral studies at the INS, Łaski immersed himself in the works of Karl Marx, first and foremost the Capital. As many others, he was impressed by Marx's schemata of reproduction in Capital, Volume II. The inconsistency between accumulation and consumption in the course of industrialization became the topic of his doctoral thesis: Accumulation and consumption during the industrialization of the Polish People's Republic (1954). In the period of the "Polish October" in 1956, Łaski gradually became influenced by Michał Kalecki, who had returned to Poland from the United Nations General Secretariat in early 1955. Kalecki's influence can already be identified in Łaski's publications on the equilibrium in the consumer goods market at that time. Marx's schemata were used to identify the sources of inflation and the shortage of goods in the centrally planned economy. In his publications, Łaski gradually detached himself from dogmatic Marxism and attained a certain critical distance. However, he had not yet gone beyond the mere critique of economic policy. According to his perception at that time, the sources of inflationary pressures were to be found in the mistakes of the central planner, his unwillingness to learn from the errors of the past, and the inadequate discipline of managers and workers of socialist enterprises. At that time, Łaski had not yet put into question the ability of the central planner to gather unbiased information and set up physically consistent plans.

=== Close collaboration with Michał Kalecki (1961–68) ===
Michał Kalecki's joining of the SGPiS in 1961 marked a new stage in the scientific career of Łaski. He belonged to the inner circle of Kalecki's collaborators, and the main focus of his work shifted to the growth theory of socialist economy. He gave one of the key presentations (together with Włodzimierz Brus) at the Congress of the International Economic Association in Vienna in 1962 and published in Ekonomista several papers on the factors of growth of the national income, on the effects of external trade on the rate of growth, and on the role of the choice of production methods in determining the growth rate of consumption and national income. Among other topics, he analyzed the effects of a one-time reduction of the capital-output ratio on the short- and long-term proportions in the growth process. Łaski also published more general papers on full employment, resource allocation and developing economies. His extensive studies on the growth theory culminated in one of his main works On the theory of socialist reproduction. The book was considered a classical work on the growth theory in socialism, was used as a textbook at Polish universities, and was translated into the Czech language. Together with Michał Kalecki, Łaski chaired a workshop on the growth theory, which soon became an assembly point of a group of predominantly young research fellows interested in the planning theory. Several scholars who subsequently became renowned both in Poland and abroad originated from this group. A further main focus of Łaski's research and teaching activities was the course for economists from the developing countries. In 1968, the circle around Michał Kalecki fell victim to the attacks of the antisemitic campaign. One – though not the only – reason for these attacks was the intellectual autonomy of the circle which contradicted the authoritarian claims of the system, even if Kalecki's associates took a definitely pro-socialist stance. Thereupon Łaski emigrated to Austria.

=== In Austria prior to the transition crisis (1968–89) ===
In Austria, Łaski participated first in founding a department of international comparative economics at the Austrian Institute of Economic Research (WIFO). He continued his theoretical studies in the field of growth theory in socialist economy. The outcome of this work was his book The Rate of Growth and the Rate of Interest in a Socialist Economy. In this book, the profit rate is a distributional category, and the interest rate is a determinant of choice of production methods. They diverge even under the condition of the “golden rule of accumulation”, assuming capital-intensive technological progress. After being appointed to chair the economics department at the Johannes Kepler University Linz Łaski broadened his research and teaching activities. One of his closest colleagues in Linz was Professor Kurt W. Rothschild. On the one hand, Łaski imparted on his students – apart from the General Theory of John Maynard Keynes – the knowledge of Kalecki's approach, particularly the dynamics of the capitalist economy and the theory of business cycles. On the other hand, he reexamined Marx's theory and also took part in the discussion on transformation of labor values into prices of production, which sparked up again. His criticism of the labor theory of value deepened under the influence of the works of Piero Sraffa and the Cambridge capital controversy. In his paper Marx's Theory of Exploitation and Technical Progress, Łaski put into question even the relationship between the rate of exploitation and the profit rate, particularly in the case when technical progress was accounted for. Łaski also participated in discussions on the theory of the tendency of the rate of profit to fall. At the same time he continued studies on Eastern Europe, the main area of his research. Łaski published many papers on the proportions of expanded reproduction and the role of capital imports in socialist economy. In his analysis he took account of inflation, of foreign trade turnovers, and of the “grey economy”. Further topics of his research at that time were the problems of national accounting, and comparisons of consumption volumes between the East and the West, particularly the comparability of price indices in a market and a centrally planned economy. Łaski also worked closely with Włodzimierz Brus, who in the mid-1970s obtained a professorship chair of economics at the University of Oxford. The major result of their long-standing research collaboration was their book Marx and the Market (1989). It contains the final reckoning of the authors with the theory and practice of real socialism on the eve of its collapse. From the 1970s onwards, Łaski had also been in close research collaboration with Josef Steindl and the Indian post-Keynesian economist Amit Bhaduri.

=== In Austria after collapse of state socialist economies (1989–2015) ===
Following the breakup of the communist bloc, Łaski concentrated on the transition of the Central, East and Southeast European countries, particularly Poland. He criticized the supply side measures of the "Washington Consensus" proposed and enforced by various international organizations by way of a “shock therapy”, i.e. the quickest possible liberalization and privatization. Already in 1989 he predicted – contrary to the mainstream and many other economists – the sharp contraction of output and long-lasting recession in the transition countries at the beginning of the 1990s. During his time as director of The Vienna Institute for International Economic Studies (1991–96), Łaski developed it into a worldwide respected research centre on economic and social developments in the East European transition countries. Kazimierz Łaski also continued to devote himself to advancing Kalecki's approach and its application to the new economic realities. In several papers, Łaski demonstrated the fundamental flaws of one of the basic tools of the neoclassical synthesis theory: the model of aggregate demand and aggregate supply (AD–AS model). Applying demand-oriented analysis, he continued to investigate current growth developments and the problems of European countries and the US, as well as the issues of the European cohesion process. Thus, for example, in his paper From Accession to Cohesion: Ireland, Greece, Portugal and Spain and Lessons for the Next Accession (2003), he critically examined the first achievements of the European Union cohesion countries – an analysis which proved to be particularly relevant during the 2008 financial crisis.

For dozens of years Łaski had done much to keep Kalecki's ideas alive. It was not an easy task, because global economics remained dominated by the hard neoliberal paradigm and Kalecki's work did not fit well within that current. Łaski was a consistent supporter of state interventionism in economy for the sake of maintaining full employment and moderating income differentiation, which in turn he saw as necessary to prevent the recurrent in capitalism extremes of economic cycles.

=== Involvement in Poland (1989–2015) ===
In 1989, at the time of the collapse of communism in Poland, Łaski attempted to provide economic advice for the new Polish government. He warned about the negative consequences of the Balcerowicz Plan, a neoliberal economic course pursued by Poland's new elites. Jacek Rostowski, who at that time worked with Finance Minister Leszek Balcerowicz, replied to Łaski's opinion, accusing him of blatant methodological errors in his analysis. Łaski, disappointed by the young adviser's arrogance, remained a critic (like his fellow Polish economist Tadeusz Kowalik) of the philosophy and practice of the Polish transformation. Together with Włodzimierz Brus, Łaski wrote From Marx to the Market, a book which offered substantial analysis of the capitalist reforms currently taking place in Eastern Europe.

After the 2008 financial crisis, Kazimierz Łaski was quick to take advantage of the signs of a comeback of interest in Kalecki's ideas in the West and he brought the issue to Poland. Łaski enjoyed renewed attention among the younger generation of Polish economists and activists. Invited by institutions and associations, including the Institute of Advanced Studies of the leftist think tank Krytyka Polityczna, he visited Poland regularly. Despite his advanced age, Łaski remained professionally active and he took it upon himself to dispute the dominant neoliberal dogma in Poland. Together with the economist and politician Jerzy Osiatyński, they conducted economic seminars at the Institute in 2013–15, in which prominent foreign economists participated. The 2015 book, Wykłady z makroekonomii. Gospodarka kapitalistyczna bez bezrobocia [Lectures on macroeconomics: capitalist economy without unemployment], is the fruit of the last years of Łaski's life. The textbook presents updated versions of the fundamental theories of John Maynard Keynes and Michał Kalecki.

== Selected publications ==
- From Marx to the Market: Socialism in Search for an Economic System (with Wlodzimierz Brus), Oxford University Press, Oxford, 1989
- An Alternative Economic Policy for Central and Eastern Europe, in: Mark Knell (ed), Economics of Transition. Structural Adjustments and Growth Prospects in Eastern Europe, Edward Elgar, Cheltenham, UK and Brookfield, Vermont, US, 1996, pp. 87–115
- Lessons to be drawn from main mistakes in the transition strategy (with Amit Bhaduri), in: Salvatore Zecchini (ed), Lessons from the Economic Transition. Central and Eastern Europe in the 1990s, OECD, Kluwer Academic Publishers, 1997
- Three Ways to High ... Unemployment, wiiw Working Papers, No. 12, Vienna, January 2000
- Effective Demand versus Profit Maximization in Aggregate Demand/Supply Analysis: A Dynamic Perspective (with Amit Bhaduri and Martin Riese), Banca Nazionale del Lavoro Quarterly Review 210 (2001), pp. 281–93.
- Growth and Savings in USA and Japan (with Roman Römisch), wiiw Working Papers, No. 16, Vienna, July 2001
- Mity i rzeczywistość w polityce gospodarczej i w nauczaniu ekonomii (Myths and reality in economic policy and teaching), INE PAN i Fundacja Innowacja, Warszawa, 2009
- The basic paradigms of the EU economic policy-making need to be changed (with Leon Podkaminer), Cambridge Journal of Economics, February 2012
- Wykłady z makroekonomii. Gospodarka kapitalistyczna bez bezrobocia (Lectures on macroeconomics: capitalist economy without unemployment), Polskie Towarzystwo Ekonomiczne, Warszawa 2015

== Literature ==
- Fink, G., G. Pöll and M. Riese (ed.): Foreword, in: Economic Theory, Political Power and Social Justice – Festschrift Kazimierz Laski, Linzer Universitätsschriften, 7, Springer-Verlag, Wien, 1987
- "Ehrung für Wirtschaftskoryphäe" Oberösterreichische Nachrichten, 28. Jänner 2012
