= Joint Harmonised EU Programme of Business and Consumer Surveys =

The Joint Harmonised EU Programme of Business and Consumer Surveys consists of economic tendency surveys which are conducted in all EU Member States and candidate countries. Based on the results of the surveys, a set of harmonized economic indicators is calculated for all participating countries, typically used for analysis and short-term forecasting of economic developments, as well as economic research. Furthermore, the indicators lend themselves to detecting turning points in the business cycle and are a complement to official statistical data on economic developments, which are released with a significantly longer time-lag.

== Programme overview ==
The European Union (EU) co-finances the implementation of business and consumer surveys in its Member States, as well as candidate countries. The recipient institutes commit to conducting monthly surveys among firms in selected economic sectors as well as consumers using a harmonised questionnaire and transmitting the results to the European Commission. The latter provides them to the public free of charge. Within the European Commission, the programme is managed by the Directorate-General for Economic and Financial Affairs (DG ECFIN).

== Sectoral coverage of the programme and sample size ==
The economic tendency surveys of the Joint Harmonised EU Programme of Business and Consumer Surveys are conducted in the following economic sectors (the exact sub-sectors covered, as well as the approximate EU-wide, monthly sample sizes are indicated in brackets):

- Manufacturing (NACE 10–33; 40510 firms per month)
- Construction (NACE 41–43, 22934 firms per month)
- Retail trade (NACE 45+47, 31441 firms per month)
- Services (NACE 49–96, 45989 firms per month)
- Financial Services Sector (NACE 64–66, 1000 firms per month)
- Consumers (41060 households per month)
- Investment survey in the manufacturing survey (NACE 10–33, 47441 per half-year)

== Harmonized questionnaire ==
The harmonised questionnaire of the Joint Harmonised EU Programme of Business and Consumer Surveys has been developed jointly with the OECD. Its questions refer to economic developments in recent months and at present, as well as the expected developments in the next months and are generally answered on a three-point (business surveys) / five-point (consumer survey) answering scale.

Here are some examples from the harmonised business surveys:

- How has your production developed over the past 3 months? It has increased / remained unchanged / decreased
- Do you consider your current overall order books to be? More than sufficient (above normal) / sufficient (normal for the season) / not sufficient (below normal)
- How do you expect your production to develop over the next 3 months? It will increase / remain unchanged / decrease

Here are some examples from the harmonised consumer survey:

- How has the financial situation of your household changed over the last 12 months? It has got a lot better / got a little better / stayed the same / got a little worse / got a lot worse / don't know
- How do you expect the general economic situation in this country to develop over the next 12 months? It will get a lot better / get a little better / stay the same / get a little worse / get a lot worse / don't know
- In view of the general economic situation, do you think that now it is the right moment for people to make major purchases such as furniture, electrical/electronic devices, etc.? Yes, it is the right moment now / it is neither the right moment nor the wrong moment / no, it is not the right moment now / don't know

Besides the above types of questions, which inquire qualitative assessments, the harmonised questionnaire also contains a few questions capturing quantitative answers, e.g. the estimated rate of capacity utilisation of the responding firms or the inflation rate consumers expect for the near future. The only harmonised survey which consists to a large extent of quantitative questions is the bi-annual investment survey in the manufacturing survey.

The complete questionnaire of the Joint Harmonised EU Programme of Business and Consumer Surveys can be accessed via the programme's dedicated User Guide. The national questionnaires designed on the basis of the harmonised questionnaire and used in the different EU Member States and candidate countries are available on the programme's website.

== Methodology ==
To achieve comparability between countries, the Joint Harmonised EU Programme of Business and Consumer Surveys is governed by two basic principles:

- use by all national institutes of the same harmonised questionnaires, and
- conduct of the national surveys, and transmission of the results, according to a common timetable.

The national questionnaires may include additional questions, beyond the harmonised ones. However, in designing national questionnaires, priority must be given to ensuring high response rates for the harmonised EU questions. This implies that the harmonised questions shall precede any other questions. There are no binding criteria in respect of the sampling method and survey mode so that the actual implementation of the programme can take into account country-specific factors. To promote further harmonisation across countries, the Directorate-General for Economic and Financial Affairs of the European Commission, which manages the programme, has released a list of 'best practice' for the conduct of business and consumer surveys in 2014. More details on the specific methodology applied in a given EU Member State or candidate country are available on the website of the programme.

== Data access ==
Based on the data submitted by the institutes participating in the Joint Harmonised EU Programme of Business and Consumer Surveys, the European Commission calculates composite indicators aimed at tracking the evolution of the business cycle in specific sectors, as well as the overall economy. There is one composite indicator per surveyed sector, a so-called 'confidence indicator', as well as an economy-wide 'Economic Sentiment Indicator' (ESI), which summarises the information of the different sectoral confidence indices. The latest readings of the confidence indices and the Economic Sentiment Indicator are released by the European Commission in a monthly press release and analysed in some more depth in a dedicated quarterly publication ('European Business Cycle Indicators').

The historical, as well as the latest results of all harmonised surveys (Seasonal adjustment and non-seasonally adjusted) can be downloaded free of charge on the website of the programme. There are dedicated data-sets for each EU Member State and candidate country, as well as the euro area and the EU. The data-sets are available for all business sectors covered by the programme and their sub-sectors (at the two-digit level of the NACE Rev. 2 statistical classification of economic activities). For the consumer survey, there are separate data-sets for the overall results in a given geographical entity and the results broken down by a number of socio-economic criteria (age, gender, income, etc.).

The data can also be accessed via Eurostat and the 'Monthly Economic Indicators' of the OECD.

== Historical development and legal base ==
The first harmonised survey of the Joint Harmonised EU Programme of Business and Consumer Surveys was conducted in manufacturing (1962) and followed by a harmonised survey in construction, as well as the harmonised investment survey in manufacturing in 1966. 1972 saw the introduction of the harmonised consumer survey before the programme was extended to retail trade in 1984 and the services sector in 1996. In 2007, the European Commission furthermore launched its financial services sector survey, which differs from the previous surveys in so far as it is conducted centrally, rather than by partner institutes in the respective EU Member State or candidate country.

The legal base of the Joint Harmonised EU Programme of Business and Consumer Surveys is a Decision of the Commission of the European Economic Community of November 1961. The programme was subsequently modified through a number of Council and Commission decisions and last approved through Commission decision C(97) 2241 of 15 July 1997. Regular updates on the implementation of the programme in terms of use, methodology and coverage were presented in Commission communications COM(2000) 770 of 29 November 2000, COM(2006) 379 of 12 July 2006, SEC(2012) 227 of 4 April 2012 and C(2016) 6634 of 20 October 2016.

== Financial Support ==
The European Commission supports the institutes conducting the harmonised surveys on its behalf with action grants, which are limited to a maximum of 50% of the total eligible costs of the surveys. These grants are designed to cover the costs associated with the adoption of the harmonised methodology. In 2017, 50 institutes we supported with a total amount of 5.4 million euros. The individual financial support ranged between 281 929 and 2 714 euros.

== Institutes supported ==
The institutes receiving financial support for conducting the harmonised surveys range from ministries, statistical offices (e.g. Insee), central banks (e.g. Banque Nationale de Belgique), universities (e.g. University of Cyprus) and research institutes (e.g. Ifo and WIFO), to business associations (e.g. Confederation of Finnish Industries) and private companies (e.g. GfK or Ipsos).

== Evaluation 2011/2012 ==
The Joint Harmonised EU Programme of Business and Consumer Surveys was subject to an evaluation in 2011/12, which was commissioned by the European Commission and conducted jointly by Ghk Consulting Ltd. and DIW Berlin. The evaluation provided evidence of the programme's survey results regularly feeding into the political decision-making process and the strategic choices of private enterprises. The list of frequent users of the harmonised data ranges from various Directorates-General of the European Commission (including Eurostat), the European Central Bank, the OECD, national central banks and ministries, over public and private research institutes and universities, to private enterprises, their lobby organisations, financial institutes and the media.

Users of the harmonised data typically use it to get an overview of the current economic situation, or as input for economic forecasts and nowcasts, as well as business cycle analyses.

== Verschiedenes ==
The Directorate-General for Economic and Financial Affairs of the European Commission, which manages the Joint Harmonised EU Programme of Business and Consumer Surveys, is a member of the Centre for International Research on Economic Tendency Surveys (CIRET).
