= Institute of Economics =

Institute of Economics may refer to:

- Institute of Economics, Academia Sinica in Taiwan
- Institute of Economics, Chinese Academy of Social Sciences
- Institute of Economics (Poland)
- Institute of Economics of the Polish Academy of Sciences
- Max Planck Institute of Economics in Germany
- Institute of Economics in the U.S. which became part of the Brookings Institution in 1927
