= General Nil =

- Directed by: Ryszard Bugajski
- Written by: Ryszard Bugajski; Krzysztof Łukaszewicz
- Produced by: Włodzimierz Niderhaus
- Starring: Olgierd Łukaszewicz; Alicja Jachiewicz
- Cinematography: Piotr Śliskowski PSC
- Edited by: Ewa Romanowska-Rózewicz PSM
- Music by: Shane Harvey
- Distributed by: Monolith Films, Chełmska
- Release date: 17 April 2009
- Country: Poland
- Language: Polish

General Nil (Polish: Generał Nil) is a Polish historical film, based on the life of general Emil August Fieldorf, pseudonym "Nil".

The film was directed by Ryszard Bugajski, and was released in 2009.

== Awards ==
- Special Jury Award, 43rd WorldFest-Houston International Film Festival
- 2010 - awards for Best Director and Best Actor, 9th Tiburon International Film Festival
- 2009 - Special Award of the Jury, 21st Polish Film Festival in America, Chicago
- 2009 - "Golden Sabre" Grand Prize, "Military Cinema" Film Festival, Warsaw
- The Silver Saturno, Saturno International Film Festival

== Cast ==
- Olgierd Łukaszewicz as General Emil Fieldorf "Nil"
- Alicja Jachiewicz as Janina Fieldorf
- Anna Cieślak as Maria Fieldorf
- Magdalena Emilianowicz as Krystyna Fieldorf
- Zbigniew Stryj as Major Stefan Bajer
- Stefan Szmidt as General Tadeusz "Bór" Komorowski
- Jacek Rozenek as Colonel Józef Różański
- Krzysztof Franciszek as Lieutenant Kazimierz Górski; investigating officer of UB
- Maciej Kozłowski as Tadeusz Grzemielewski
- Leszek Lichota − as provocator „Klemm”
- Artur Dziurman − as Józef Czaplicki
- Vadim Afanassjev − as Siemion Dawydow
- Tomasz Dedek − as General Stanisław Tatar
- Grzegorz Wolf − as Minister Stanisław Radkiewicz
- Jadwiga Klekowska − as Rita Radkiewicz
- Wenanty Nosul − as Bolesław Bierut
- Katarzyna Herman −as judge Maria Gurowska
- Grzegorz Kowalczyk − as prosecutor Beniamin Wejsblech
- Piotr Pilitowski − as defense attorney Jerzy Mering
- Adam Woronowicz − as judge Igor Andrejew
- Tadeusz Bradecki − as Emil Merz
- Dorota Landowska − as Paulina Kern
- Zbigniew Kozłowski − as Adam Borys „Pług" (,,Plough")
- Maria Mamona − as Helena Błociszewska
- Marek Lewandowski − as General Gustaw Paszkiewicz
- Miłogost Reczek − as General Zygmunt Walter-Janke
- Piotr Rękawik − as comrade in Holding cell
- Beata Chruścińska − as hostess of the flat ,,Nil" stayed at during the assassination of Franz Kutschera
- Paweł Iwanicki − as Urząd Bezpieczenstwa agent searching the Fieldolf Household
- Andrzej Deskur − as prosecutor
- Piotr Grabowski (born 1972) − as holding cell corrective officer
- Krzysztof Łukaszewicz − as courier from London
