= Austrian Institute of Economic Research =

Austrian economic research institute in Vienna

- Österreichisches Institut für Wirtschaftsforschung
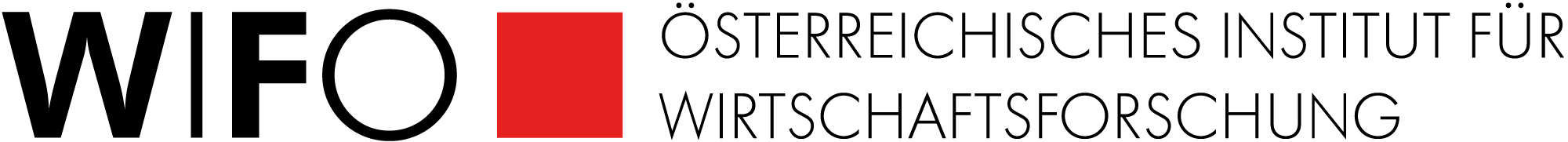
- Established: 1927; 99 years ago
- Research type: Registered association (Verein)
- Budget: €19.5 million (2024)
- Director: Gabriel Felbermayr
- Staff: c. 120 (full-time equivalents)
- Location: Austria; 48.181579°N 16.389938°E
- Website: www.wifo.ac.at

The Austrian Institute of Economic Research (German: Österreichisches Institut für Wirtschaftsforschung, WIFO) is an economic research institute organised as a registered association and based in Vienna, on the grounds of the Arsenal.

WIFO has an annual budget of €19.5 million (as of 2024) and is thus regarded as the largest non-university economic research institute in Austria.

== Objectives and mission ==
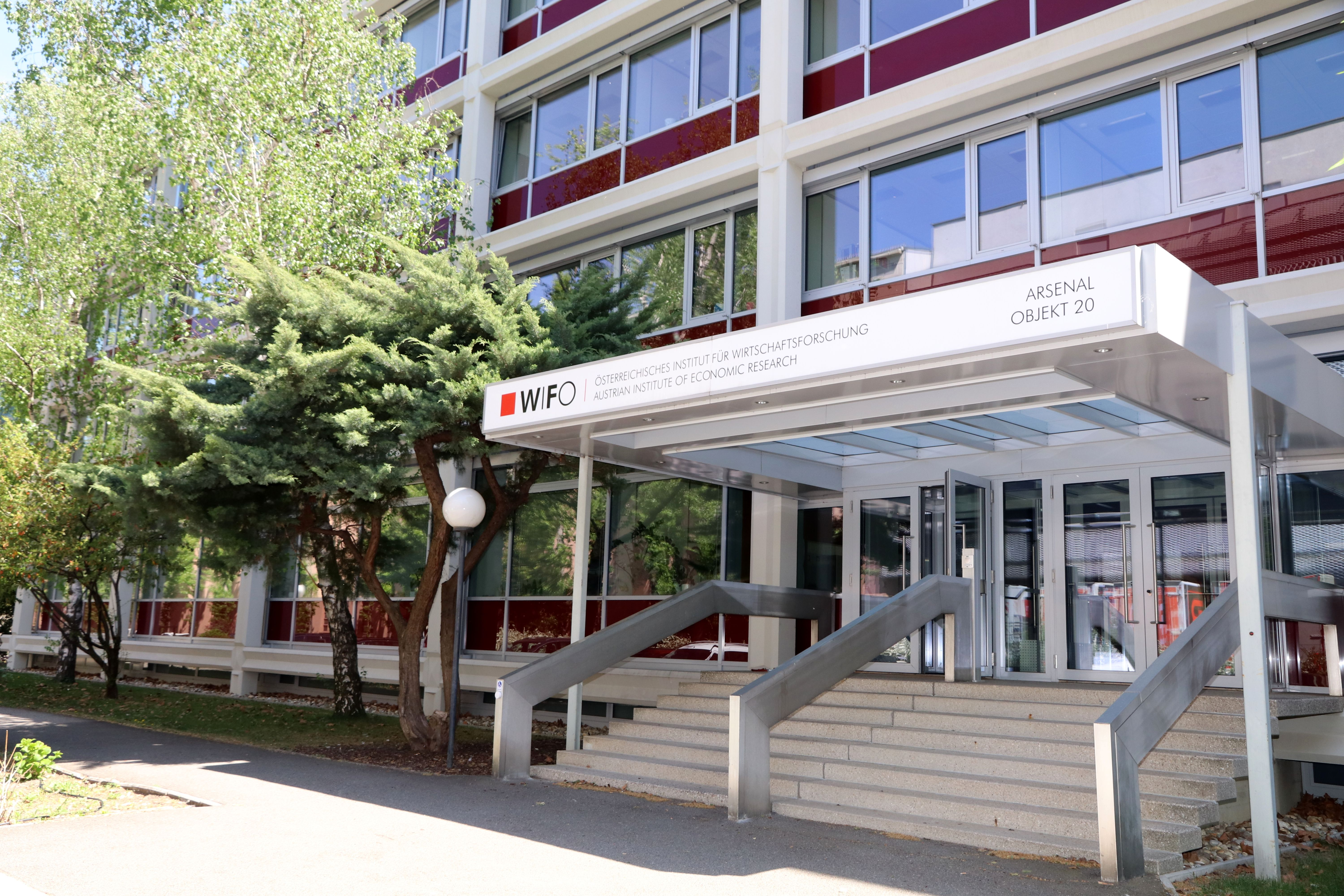
WIFO's headquarters in the Vienna Arsenal

Its stated purpose is the "analysis of Austrian and international economic developments". Through its analyses, the institute seeks to contribute to a better-founded and more objective debate on economic policy. As an independent research institute with an empirical orientation, it deals with Austrian and, increasingly, European economic policy. WIFO is best known for its short- and medium-term business cycle forecasts.

According to its own account, WIFO pursues "the mission of building a bridge between academic basic research and economic policy application in order to contribute to solving socio-economic challenges".

WIFO acts as a consultation partner for international organisations (such as the European Union, the OECD and the IMF) and for credit rating agencies with regard to national economic developments and the assessment of economic policy measures.

== Organisation and structure ==
WIFO's legal form is that of a registered association. Its core funding is secured through membership contributions from institutional sponsors, among them the Federal Ministry of Finance, the Oesterreichische Nationalbank, the members of the Austrian social partnership and the federal states, as well as, to a small extent, from companies and private individuals. Public grants support basic research. About one third of the budget is generated through third-party funding from commissioned projects, sales and other income.

Since 1 October 2021 the institute has been headed by Gabriel Felbermayr, who succeeded Christoph Badelt in this role. The institute currently employs about 120 staff (measured in full-time equivalents).

== History ==
WIFO was founded in 1927 as the Österreichisches Institut für Konjunkturforschung ("Austrian Institute for Business Cycle Research") by Friedrich August von Hayek and Ludwig von Mises, modelled on the Berlin-based Institute for Business Cycle Research run by Ernst Wagemann. From 1937 Alexander Gerschenkron also worked at the institute.

Succeeding Oskar Morgenstern, Reinhard Kamitz headed the institute from 1936 to 1939 and in 1938 carried out its incorporation into Wagemann's institute. The institute was first renamed Wiener Institut für Wirtschafts- und Konjunkturforschung and later Wiener Institut für Wirtschaftsforschung.

After the war the institute was re-established under the name Österreichisches Institut für Wirtschaftsforschung by Franz Nemschak. He was followed as director by Hans Seidel (economist), Helmut Kramer (economist), Karl Aiginger (2005–2016) and Christoph Badelt (2016–2021). On 1 October 2021 he was succeeded by Gabriel Felbermayr.

== Research ==
Applied economic research is the core of the association's work. The institute's scientific work is carried out by five research groups, which are organised along economic disciplines; each group elects a coordinator from among its economists for a limited term:

1. Macroeconomics and Public Finance
2. Labour Economics, Income and Social Security
3. Industrial, Innovation and International Economics
4. Regional Economics and Spatial Analysis
5. Climate, Environmental and Resource Economics

Researchers also work across the research groups in eight thematic platforms:

- Ageing
- Business Cycle and Forecasting
- Competitiveness
- Digital Transformation
- Distribution
- European Integration and Global Governance
- Green Transformation and Energy Systems
- Supply Chains

=== Methods and approach ===
The founders, Ludwig von Mises and the later Nobel laureate Friedrich von Hayek, are regarded as leading representatives of the Austrian School of economics. After the war, Keynesianism became established in macroeconomic analysis at WIFO. The institute's close contacts with politics during this period were reflected, for example, in the appointment of former director Hans Seidel (economist) as a state secretary in the government in 1981.

Today a variety of methods and theoretical approaches shapes the work in the research areas. WIFO maintains models for the analysis of micro-, macro-, regional and environmental economic questions and has extensive econometric expertise. The handling and visualisation of complex data as well as detailed knowledge of the institutional foundations of national and international economic policy are also among the institute's competencies.

WIFO's research areas share an orientation towards applied empirical and economic policy questions and a proactive understanding of the role of the state in a market economy with open borders and changing patterns of globalisation. WIFO pursues a scientific advisory role and sees itself as a bridge between economic theory, empirical work and policy.

== Cooperation, committees and advisory boards ==
WIFO economists contribute their expertise to around 90 committees and advisory boards, including:

- Austrian Fiscal Advisory Council
- Pension Commission (Alterssicherungskommission)
- Advisory Council for Economic and Social Affairs
- Competition Commission
- Foreign Trade Policy Advisory Board
- Statistics Austria
- International Institute for Applied Systems Analysis (IIASA)
- European Forum Alpbach
- KDZ – Centre for Public Administration Research
- Austrian Society for European Politics
- Commissions and working groups of the European Union

Economic objectives, according to WIFO, include not only growth and income but also other elements of a welfare function, as reflected in the debate that questions gross domestic product as the sole measure of welfare. Research on Eastern Europe was an early focus of WIFO; in the 1970s it was spun off into an independent research institution, the Vienna Institute for International Economic Studies (wiiw).

WIFO also takes part in international and national scientific networks in order to promote scholarly exchange at the specialist level, including:

- Association of European Conjuncture Institutes (AIECE)
- Centre for International Research on Economic Tendency Surveys (CIRET)
- European Forecasting Research Association for the Macro-Economy (Euroframe)
- Euroconstruct
- Trade Economist Network
- Research Centre International Economics (FIW)
- Austrian Economic Association (Nationalökonomische Gesellschaft, NOeG)

== Notable people ==
- Karl Aiginger, director from 2005 to 2016
- Christoph Badelt, director from 2016 to 2021
- Gudrun Biffl, research staff member 1975 to 2009
- Lothar Bosse, from 1949
- Fritz Breuss
- Felix Butschek, 1962 to 1997, deputy director from 1981
- Gabriel Felbermayr, director since 2021
- Alois Guger, research staff member 1981 to 2009
- Stephan Koren, staff member from 1945 to 1965
- Helmut Kramer (economist), director from 1981 to 2005
- Kurt Kratena, staff member from 1993 to 2015
- Kazimierz Łaski, research associate 1969 to 1971
- Christine Mayrhuber, senior economist, labour economics, pensions expert
- Peter Milford-Hilferding
- Kurt W. Rothschild, research associate from 1947 to 1966
- Margit Schratzenstaller, deputy director of WIFO 2006 to 2008 and 2016 to 2019
- Josef Steindl
- Stephan Schulmeister, research staff member 1972 to 2012
- Ewald Walterskirchen, research staff member 1970 to 2010
- Kurt Wessely

== Publications and public communication ==
WIFO publishes several series, including the WIFO-Monatsberichte (monthly reports), the WIFO Reports on Austria, the WIFO Working Papers, the WIFO Research Briefs, the WIFO business cycle survey (WIFO-Konjunkturtest), Wirtschaft in den Bundesländern (the economy of the Austrian federal states) and the WIFO-Studien. Active public relations work and responding to national and international media enquiries are also among the institute's core tasks. In addition to regular press releases and press conferences, the institute's research findings are communicated through newsletters, news items and social media. The annual Austrian economists' ranking regularly confirms WIFO's key role in academia, politics and the media in Austria.

=== WIFO Data System ===
WIFO's "Data Science and Management" team provides indicators on domestic and international economic activity through the WIFO Data System (WDS). The WDS is an information system developed jointly by WIFO and the Economic and Social Sciences Computing Centre (WSR); it imports data from a range of domestic and foreign sources, harmonises them and prepares them for scientific analysis and economic policy decisions.

== See also ==
- Institute for Advanced Studies (Vienna)
- Vienna Institute for International Economic Studies
- German Institute for Economic Research
