= Włodzimierz Brus =

Polish economist and functionary (1921–2007)

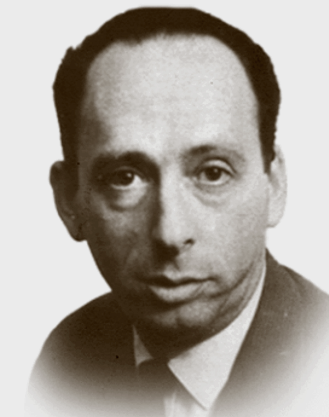
- Born: Beniamin Zylberberg; 23 August 1921; Płock, Second Polish Republic
- Died: 31 August 2007 (aged 86); Oxford, United Kingdom
- Spouse: Helena Wolińska-Brus

Academic background
- Education: Leningrad University; John Casimir University

Academic work
- Discipline: Socialist economics
- School or tradition: Neo-Marxian economics
- Institutions: University of Oxford; Warsaw University

Włodzimierz Brus (/bruːs/; Polish: [vwoˌd͡ʑimeʂ ˈbrus]; born Beniamin Zylberberg, 23 August 1921 – 31 August 2007) was an economist and party functionary in communist Poland. He emigrated from Poland in 1972, removed from power after the 1968 Polish political crisis. Brus spent the rest of his life in the United Kingdom.

== Early life and education ==
Brus was born in 1921 into a Jewish family in Płock in the Second Polish Republic. He began his studies there at Wolna Wszechnica. After the 1939 German and Soviet invasion of Poland, he fled to the Soviet occupation zone and settled in Lwów (now Lviv, Ukraine) a Polish city conquered by the Red Army.

He continued his studies at John Casimir University (now Lviv University) and later at the Leningrad University (now Saint Petersburg State University) in the Soviet Union. He then fled to Saratov, where he was a Comintern teacher and also worked in a factory.

Towards the end of the war, Brus returned to Poland with the Soviet-controlled Polish First Army, only to find that his parents and sister had been murdered in Treblinka extermination camp.

He ran into his young Jewish wife Fajga (now Helena Wolińska), who he thought had been murdered in the Holocaust. but she was by then married to a commander of Gwardia Ludowa and first commandant of the communist state police Milicja Obywatelska, a deputy minister of the Ministry of Public Security of Poland, Franciszek Jóźwiak. (1945–1949).

== Career ==
After the war, Brus became the head of propaganda for the communist Polish Workers' Party (PPR). He also wrote his doctoral thesis on the Marxist law of value and then started teaching at Warsaw University.

In 1952 he wrote a propaganda textbook in which he expressed admiration for Joseph Stalin's work The Economic Problems of Socialism. He also attacked Titoism and Władysław Gomułka's ideas, claiming that neither proposed Soviet paths to socialism.

In 1955, Brus became the vice-chairman of a council which was to advise the Gomułka government on economic reforms, but, with the economic stabilization that followed the Poznań 1956 uprising, most of the council's proposals were ignored.

In 1956, he remarried Wolińska, who had recently been fired from her job as a military prosecutor, accused of violating the rule of law in staged trials of Polish officers, which frequently resulted in executions.

In 1961, Brus's most influential work The General Problems of the Functioning of the Socialist Economy was published. In it he argued that both democracy and market mechanisms were a necessity on the road to socialism. In 1965, he testified in defense of Jacek Kuroń and Karol Modzelewski, who were on trial for their "Open Letter to the Party" calling for democratic reforms.

He also defended Leszek Kołakowski and Krzysztof Pomian when they were expelled from the party, but in 1968 he was himself expelled. Between 1968 and 1972, Brus worked as a researcher in the Institute of Housing, Warsaw and was not allowed to publish under his real name. In 1972, he emigrated with Wolińska to the United Kingdom.

He initially only found temporary positions, first in Glasgow, then in St Antony's College, Oxford, but eventually became Professor of Modern Russian and East European Studies and professorial fellow of Wolfson College, Oxford. In 1989, together with Kazimierz Laski, he published From Marx to the Market, which expanded the arguments presented in Brus's 1961 work.

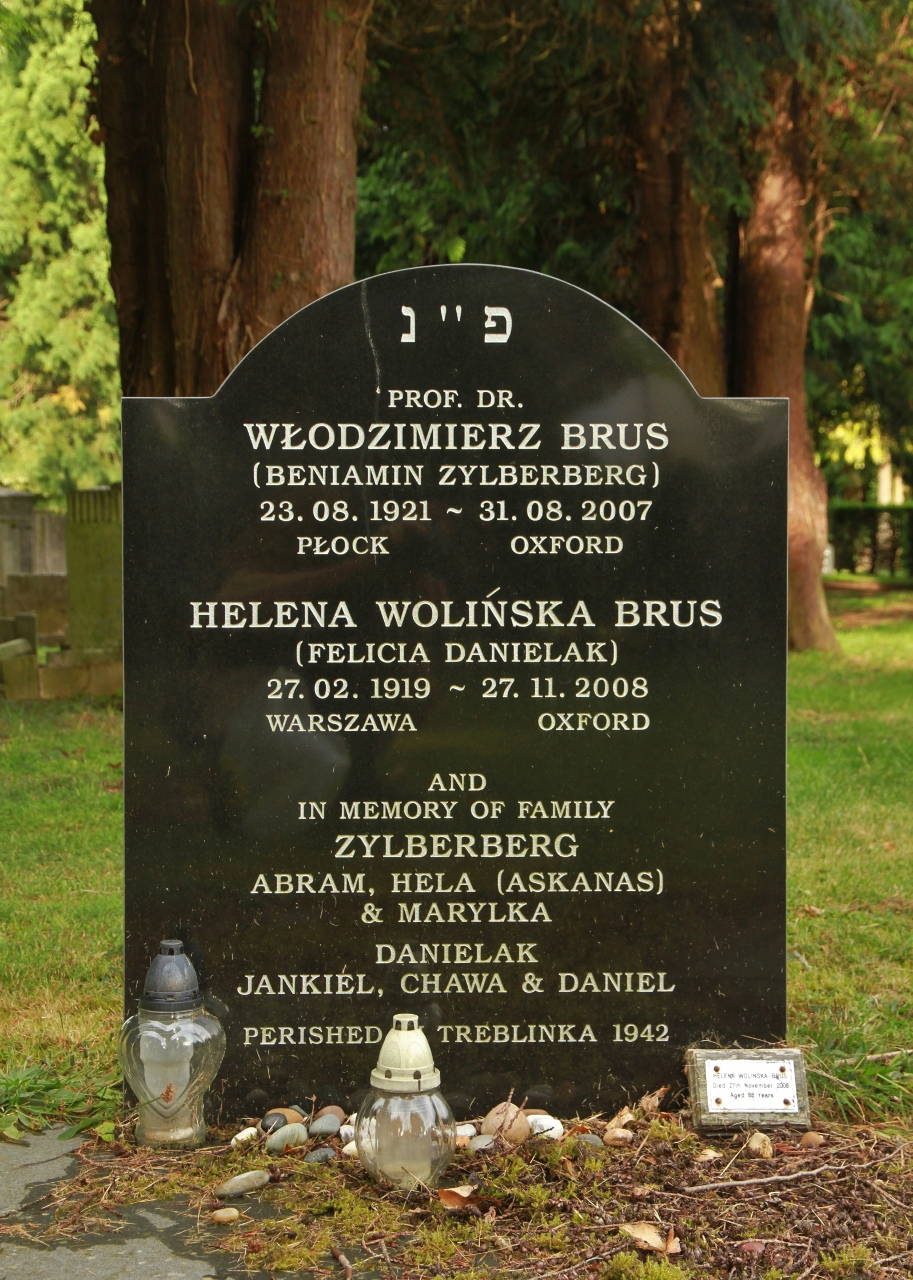
Grave of Włodzimierz Brus and Helena Wolińska-Brus in Wolvercote Cemetery, Oxford

Polish prosecutors issued a European Arrest Warrant (EAW) against his wife Wolińska on 20 November 2007. Brus died earlier that year, on 31 August 2007.

Brus's intellectual contributions were summarised in the Royal Economic Society's newsletter after his death.

Awards
Preceded by Marcel Liebman	Deutscher Memorial Prize; 1976	Succeeded by S. S. Prawer
