= Karl Aiginger =

Austrian economist (born 1948)

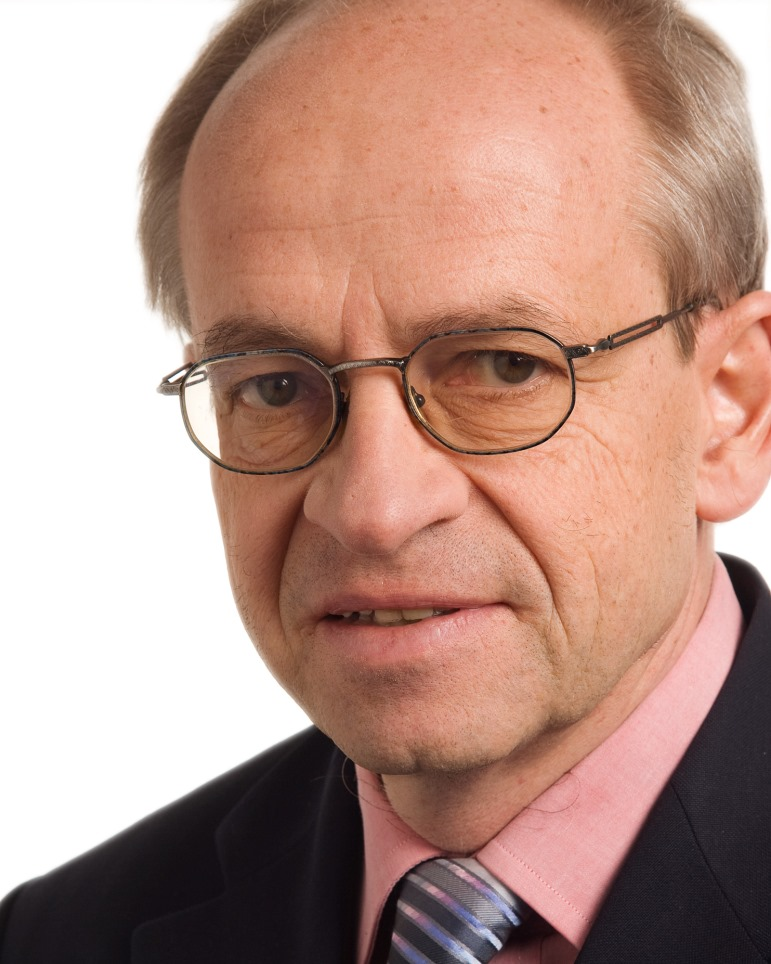
- Born: October 23, 1948 (age 77); Vienna, Austria

Academic background
- Education: University of Vienna

Academic work
- Discipline: Industrial organization
- Institutions: Austrian Institute of Economic Research; Vienna University of Economics and Business; Johannes Kepler University Linz
- Website: Information at IDEAS / RePEc

Karl Aiginger (born October 23, 1948) is an Austrian economist. He was the head of the Austrian Institute of Economic Research (WIFO) between 2005 and 2016, he is a professor at the Vienna University of Economics and Business and an honorary professor at the Johannes Kepler University Linz. He was succeeded by Christoph Badelt as the head of WIFO in September 2016. He established and manages the lateral thinking platform Policy Crossover Center, an interdisciplinary discussion forum on European policy. As an author, he is widely held in libraries worldwide.

== Life ==
He studied at the University of Vienna (1966–1974) and at Purdue University (Indiana, United States (1978). He has been working at the Austrian Institute of Economic Research (WIFO) since 1970. Karl Aiginger is a professor of economic policy at the Vienna University of Economics and Business and at the Johannes Kepler University Linz. He was a visiting professor at the Massachusetts Institute of Technology (MIT, 1991) and at the University of California, Los Angeles (United States, 1997). He has worked as a professor at the Stanford Graduate School of Business (California, United States, 2002) and given lectures at the Changsha University (Hunan, China). Karl Aiginger is married and has two children.

== Work ==
Karl Aiginger specializes in industrial organization and economic strategies. He also focuses on the analysis of industrial policy, innovation, the competitiveness of companies, international competition, and the European economic and social model.

He was the founding editor of the Journal of Industry, Competition and Trade and was the project leader for the analytical principles underpinning the competition reports of the European Commission's Directorate-General for Internal Market, Industry, Entrepreneurship and SMEs. He evaluated the Finnish system for innovation on behalf of the Government of Finland and was in charge of the evaluating the system of Austrian research subsidies and funding on behalf of the Federal Government of Austria. He was on the supervisory board of the holding company of nationalized Austrian companies.

His work encompasses theoretical essays on decisions made under uncertainty by companies and essays on the policy-relevant assessment of the competitiveness of nations (for the European Commission and the OECD). He has written articles for the Advisory Council for Economic and Social Affairs as well as the reform dialogue of the Austrian Federal Government. Over the past few years, he has focused increasingly on the causes and consequences of the 2008 financial crisis and European economic policy strategies. He published on globalization, the future role of Europe in the new world order with the USA as “sole remaining superpower” retreating from multilateralism and China on the way back to Number 1. He discusses possible cooperation with Africa in combating climate change as well mitigating the refugee streams to Europe. He led the research project Welfare, Wealth and Work for Europe from 2012 to 2016. It was funded by the European Union and coordinated by the Austrian Institute of Economic Research. It was a key academic project accompanying the European Union's Europe 2020 strategy and extending it beyond, providing a basis for a more dynamic, green and socially-oriented society. The closing report and the executive summary were presented in Brussels in February 2016 to the European Parliament, the European Commission and the media in a final conference at which Kenneth Arrow of Stanford University held the welcoming address.

A white paper was prepared under his leadership in 2006 on Austrian economic policy entitled "More employment through growth on the basis of innovation and qualification", which had a major influence on Austrian economic policy. In industrial policy, Aiginger advocates the concept of a systemic industrial policy which cooperates with innovation policy, labor market and competition policy with the final goal of serving societal needs. If it is designed strategically, a "green industrial policy" must not reduce price competitiveness but should actually create a competitive advantage. This issue is explored in depth in a special volume of the Journal of Industry, Competition and Trade. Higher costs for energy or emission at an industrial location should be offset by lower taxes on labor and a better supply of research resources, universities and technical colleges. In this way, a country gains competitive advantages that are important for the future, it becomes a technological leader in renewable energies and energy efficiency, and saves costs associated with making up for environmental damage.

It is a main message of Aiginger's work not to equate competitiveness with low costs or to measure it using the external balance, but to measure it by outcomes, specifically defining competitiveness as the "ability to deliver Beyond GDP goals". Industrialized countries must follow a strategy based on quality. A cost strategy can be copied by low-income countries at any time (the "high road strategy vs. the low road strategy"). The broad definition of competitiveness was also recently adopted by the European Economic and Social Committee (EESC) in which the trade unions originally wanted to reject the new "national committees for competitiveness" because they feared an overly restrictive, cost-cutting policy. Following a change in the definition of competitiveness in the direction of fulfilling targets that go "beyond GDP", as proposed by Aiginger and WWWforEurope, the EESC was able to approve the creation of new commissions. Karl Aiginger continues to work on European issues in the Policy Crossover Center, Vienna-Europa and at the Vienna University of Economics and Business from an increasingly interdisciplinary standpoint.
