= August Emil Fieldorf =

Polish general

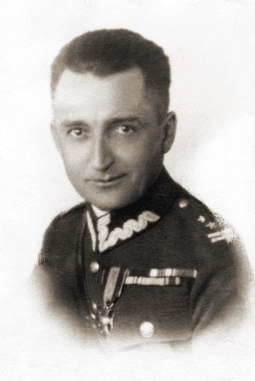
- Born: 20 March 1895; Kraków, Austria-Hungary
- Died: 24 February 1953 (aged 57); Mokotów Prison, Warsaw, Polish People's Republic
- Cause of death: death by hanging
- Military career
- Allegiance: Austria-Hungary; Second Polish Republic
- Branch: Austro-Hungarian Army; Polish Armed Forces; Home Army
- Service years: 1914–1945
- Rank: Generał brygady (Brigadier general)
- Nicknames: Weller, Jordan, Nil
- Units: Polish Legions; Border Protection Corps
- Commands: Commander of Kedyw; Commander of NIE
- Conflicts: First World War; Polish–Soviet War; Second World War
- Awards

August Emil Fieldorf (nom de guerre: “Nil”; 20 March 1895 – 24 February 1953) was a Polish brigadier general who served as deputy commander-in-chief of the Home Army after the suppression of the Warsaw Uprising (August 1944 – October 1944).

In 1953, he was executed by the communist regime.

== Biography ==
General Fieldorf's ancestors were partly of German origin. He was born on 20 March 1895 in Kraków. In the city, he finished his studies at the boy's college of St Nicholas and later a seminary. In 1910, he joined the Polish pro-independence paramilitary organization Riflemen's Association, becoming a full member in 1912. He also finished the school for non-commissioned officers.

=== World War I ===
On 6 August 1914, Fieldorf volunteered for the newly formed 1st Brigade of the Legions under Józef Piłsudski. With them, he set out for the Russian Front, where he served in the position of second-in-command of an infantry platoon. In 1916, he was promoted to sergeant, and in 1917 directed to officer school.

After the oath crisis, he was pressed into the Austro-Hungarian Army and moved to the Italian front, which he abandoned to return to Poland. In August 1918, he volunteered at the Polish Military Organisation in his home city of Kraków.

=== Formation of a new Polish state ===
From November 1918, Fieldorf served in the ranks of the Polish Army in the newly forming Second Republic, initially as a platoon commander and, from March 1919, commanded a heavy machine gun company. In 1919 and 1920, he took part in the campaign to join the Wilno region to Poland proper. After the commencement of the Polish-Bolshevik War, as a company commander he participated in liberating Dyneburg, Żytomierz and in the 1920 Polish Expedition to Kiev.

Fieldorf married Janina Kobylinska in 1919, with whom he had two daughters, Krystyna and Maria. Remaining on active duty after World War I, he was promoted to major and posted to the 1st Polish Infantry Regiment, as a battalion commander. In 1935, he was given command of the "Troki" independent battalion of the Border Protection Corps. A year later, he became a lieutenant colonel. Shortly before the outbreak of World War II, he was made commander of the 51st Giuseppe Garibaldi Rifle Regiment within the 12th Infantry Division on the eastern fringes of Poland (Kresy Wschodnie).

== World War II ==
Fieldorf commanded his regiment during the Polish September Campaign. After the Division's defeat, on the night of September 8–9, he fled in civilian clothes to his native Kraków. From there he attempted to get to France, but was stopped on the Slovak border. He was interned in October 1939, but fled several weeks later from a camp and reached France via Hungary, where he joined the newly-forming Polish Armed Forces in the West.

In France, he completed staff courses and was promoted to full colonel in May 1940. In September of that year, he was smuggled back to occupied Poland as the first emissary of the Polish government-in-exile, under the nom de guerre "Nil" which he had chosen for himself. His circuitous route back to Poland took him through South Africa, and by air, over Rhodesia, Sudan, and Egypt, then on to Romania, and by train to Poland. His aeroplane's flight-path over Sudan and Egypt followed the Nile, hence his nom de guerre, "Nil" (Nile in Polish). He initially joined the Union of Armed Struggle in Warsaw and from 1941 in Wilno and in Białystok. A year later he was given command of the Kedyw (special operations executive) of the AK, where he served until February 1944. It was on his order that the SS and Police Leader Franz Kutschera was assassinated on 1 February 1944 in Operation Kutschera by Szare Szeregi.

Shortly before the collapse of the Warsaw Uprising on 28 September 1944, he was promoted to the rank of brigadier general with an order from the Supreme Commander Kazimierz Sosnkowski. He became the deputy commander-in-chief of the AK under General Leopold Okulicki in October 1944. He was also nominated for future command of the NIE Organisation, which was formed from the cadre of the AK with the intention of resisting the new Polish Stalinist government.

== Arrests and execution ==
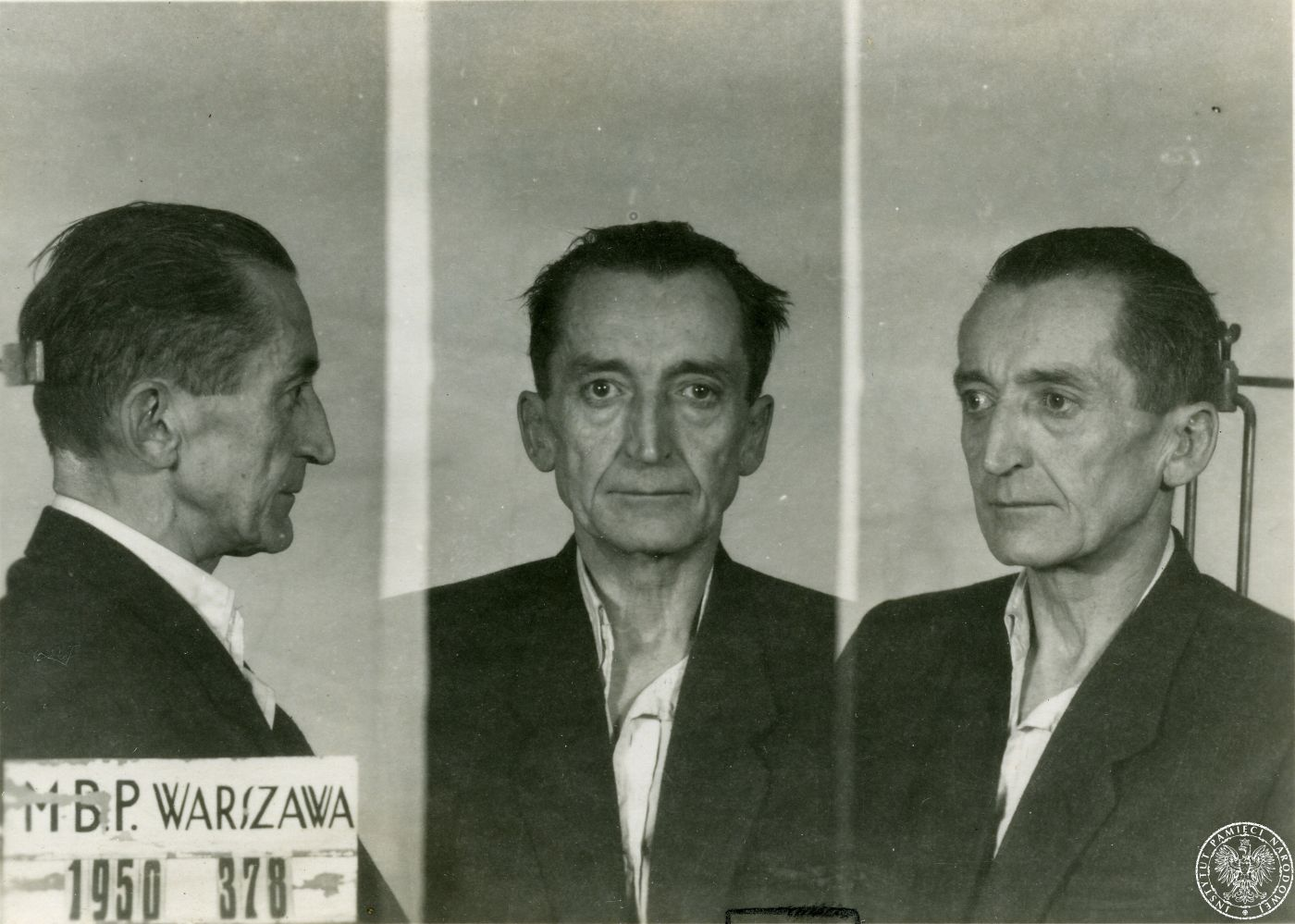
Mugshot of Emil Fieldorf after being arrested in 1950

On 7 March 1945, Fieldorf was arrested by the Soviet NKVD in the town of Milanówek. Initially, he was misidentified under the name Walenty Gdanicki and sent to a Gulag camp in the Ural Mountains. Released in 1947, he returned to new Poland ruled by the communist Polish Workers' Party government and the increasingly repressive Ministry of Public Security. He settled in Biała Podlaska under his assumed name and did not return to underground activities. Moving between Warsaw and Kraków, he eventually settled in Łódź.

The government, which was persecuting former resistance members loyal to the London-based government-in-exile, offered an amnesty to them, in 1948. Not knowing that the amnesty was a sham, Fieldorf outed himself to the authorities. He was then placed under investigatory arrest in Warsaw. In prison, he refused to collaborate with the Communist security services, even under torture. General Fieldorf's brutal interrogations were personally supervised by MBP colonel Józef Różański. Kazimierz Gorski, Polish secret police, the UB interrogator, testified in 1997: "[Józef] Różański would stop by frequently during many of my interrogations of general [August] Fieldorf, and he would have conversations with him on many subjects. The prosecuting attorney Benjamin Wajsblech would show up frequently as well, and would, on many occasions, give me verbal instructions. I prepared a decision to refuse the general's [defense] evidence materials. I wrote it under the dictation of Wajsblech. I didn't decide as to whom, and how, I should interrogate".

Fieldorf was accused by prosecutor Helena Wolińska-Brus of being a "fascist-Hitlerite criminal" and having ordered an execution of Soviet partisans while serving in the AK. After a kangaroo court trial, he was sentenced to death on 16 April 1952 by the presiding judge Maria Gurowska. An appeal to a higher court failed, and the family's plea for a pardon was denied by then the communist leader Bolesław Bierut who refused to grant clemency. The sentence was carried out, by hanging, on 24 February 1953 at 3:00 pm in the Mokotów Prison in Warsaw.

The Communist Prosecuting Attorney, Wiktor Gattner, described General Fieldorf's last moments as follows:

I asked the condemned if he had any wishes. Fieldorf responded: 'Please notify my family'. I stated that his family would be notified [...] The condemned persistently looked straight into my eyes. He stood erect. No one was holding him. He made an appearance of a very strong man. One would almost admire his composure amidst such dramatic events. He neither screamed, nor made any gestures. I said: Carry out [the execution]! The executioner and one of the guards approached the condemned […] I went to see the warden afterwards, and then by my own hand I prepared the protocol of the execution.

General Fieldorf's body was never returned to his family, and was buried in a location which remains unknown. In 2009, an article in a British Telegraph newspaper suggested that Fieldorf was buried in a mass grave in a Warsaw cemetery, together with the remains of 248 other murdered Polish non-communists.

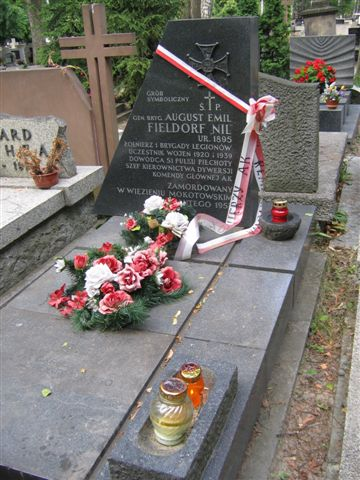
Fieldorf's cenotaph at Warsaw's Powązki Cemetery

In 1958, the prosecutor's office discontinued any further investigations.

== Commemorating and recognition ==
In 1972, a statue was erected on his symbolic grave. In 1989, following the collapse of Communist Poland, Fieldorf was officially rehabilitated.

In 2006, President Lech Kaczyński posthumously awarded him the Order of the White Eagle. In 2012, the supposed mass grave site was to be searched for Fieldorf's remains.

=== Search for justice ===
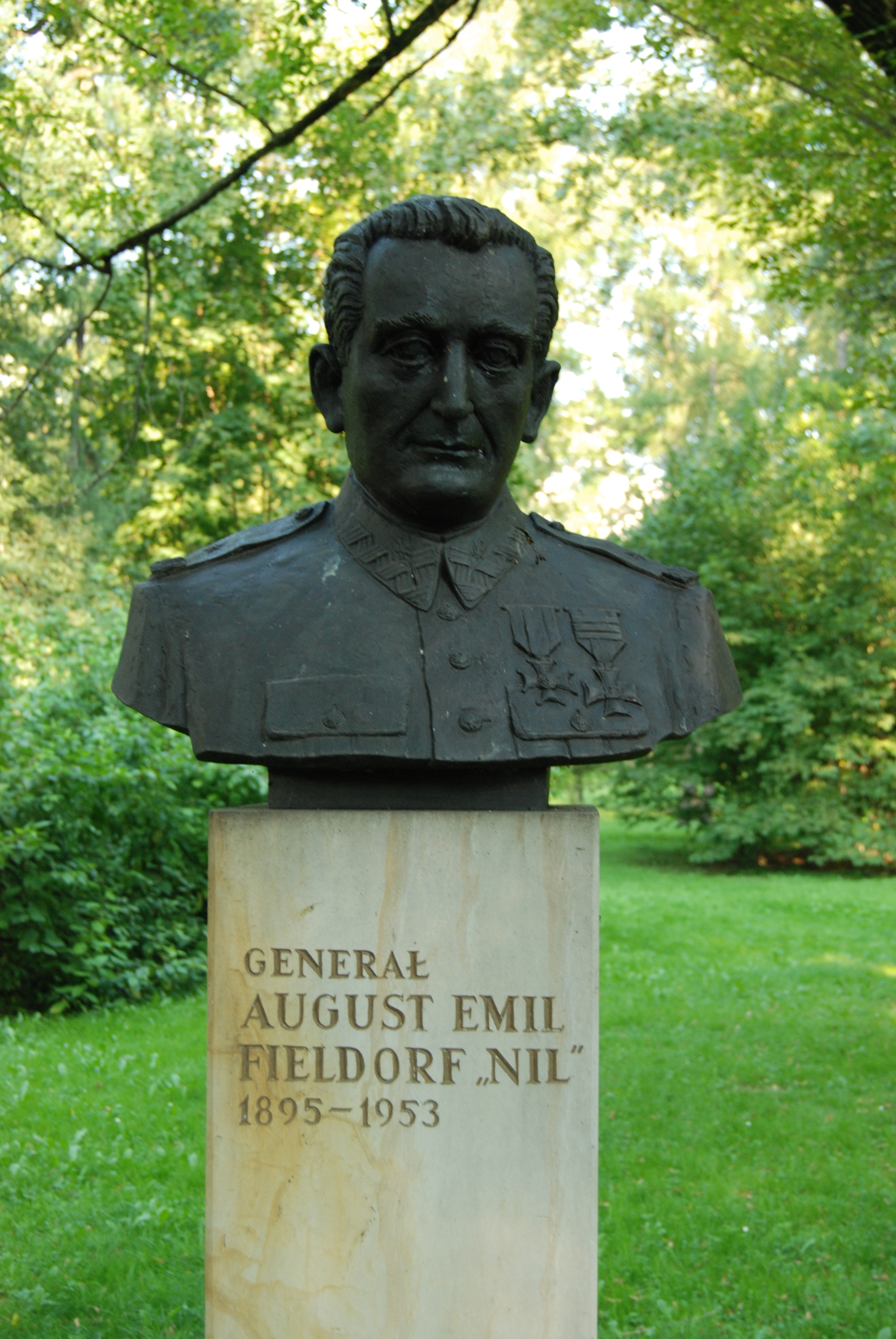
Fieldorf statue, Cracow

Fieldorf's daughter, Maria Fieldorf Czarska, called for the prosecutor responsible for the execution of her father, Helena Wolińska-Brus (who lived in Oxford, England until her death in 2008), to be brought to face justice in Poland. Wolińska-Brus, a military prosecutor in the 1950s, was accused of aiding in the investigation and trial that resulted in Fieldorf's execution. Wolińska-Brus signed Fieldorf's arrest warrant and extended his detention several times, although she was aware of his innocence. A 1956 report issued by the communist authorities concluded that Wolińska-Brus had violated the rule of law and was involved in mock investigations and show trials that frequently resulted in executions. The charges against her were initiated by the Institute of National Remembrance, which claimed Wolińska-Brus was an "accessory to a court murder", which is classified as a Stalinist crime, and is punishable by up to 10 years in prison. The case attracted international attention. The United Kingdom refused to extradite her, and Wolińska-Brus died on 26 November 2008 without being brought to justice.

Speaking about other individuals who have had complicity in the court-sanctioned murder (that is of fabricated evidence) of her father, Maria Fieldorf-Czarska said:

I can neither allow the investigation [into the murder] of my father to be closed, nor to allow the following individuals to escape justice: the Deputy Director of Justice at the General Prosecutors' Office, Alicja Graff, the Prosecuting Attorney, Wiktor Gattner, and the Interrogator, Kazimierz Gorski. They could have refused [to take part in my father's murder]. No one forced them either physically or psychologically [to do it]. I demand that the people who murdered my father be brought to justice [...] I dream of Poland, whose institutions of justice are transparent and worthy of true respect and confidence. These types of institutions ought to be the foundation of a sovereign nation. I would want us, Poles, so much, to be able to choose our own examples to follow, and not those promoted by others.

- Józef Różański died in 1981
- Maria Gurowska died in 1998
- Alicja Graff died in 2005

== Feature film ==
In 2009 a historical drama movie entitled Generał Nil based on Fieldorf's life premiered in Poland to generally positive reviews. It was directed by Ryszard Bugajski with Olgierd Łukaszewicz in the title role.

== Honours, Decorations and Citations ==
- Order of the White Eagle (2006)
- Gold Cross of Order of Virtuti Militari
- Silver Cross of Virtuti Militari (1923)
- Cross of Independence (9 January 1932)
- Knight's Cross of the Order of Polonia Restituta (11 November 1937)
- Cross of Valour (four times)
- Army Medal for War (four times)
- Gold Cross of Merit (1929)

== See also ==
- Witold Pilecki
- Maria Gurowska
- Anatol Fejgin
- Stefan Michnik
- 1951 Mokotów Prison execution
- Cursed soldiers

== Notes and references ==
- Biography of Brigadier-General Emil August Fieldorf
- "Is this justice or revenge?". The Independent. December 30, 1998. Archived from the original on December 5, 2007 – via FindArticles.
- Oxford don's wife 'sent war hero to his death', The Daily Telegraph, 22 November 2007
- Britain must not stand in the way of Polish justice, The Scotsman, 25 November 2007
- Polish enemies fight over Gen Emil Fieldorf, The Daily Telegraph, 25 November 2007
- Doomed Soldiers 1944–1963, The Untold Story

== Bibliography ==
- Stanisław Marat, Jacek Snopkiewicz, Zbrodnia. Sprawa generała Fieldorfa-Nila, Wydawnictwo Alfa, Warszawa 1989, ISBN 83-7001-308-2,
- Tadeusz Kryska-Karski i Stanisław Żurakowski, Generałowie Polski Niepodległej, Editions Spotkania, Warszawa 1991, wyd. II uzup. i poprawione, s. 91,
