= Helmut Staubmann =

Austrian sociologist

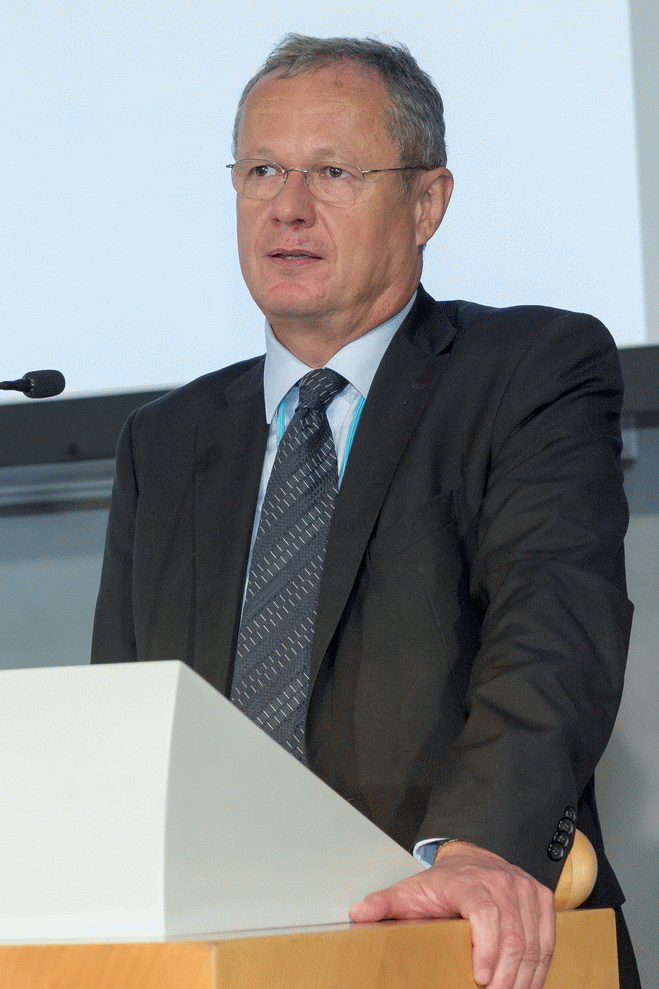
- Born: 7 March 1956 (age 70); Judenburg, Austria
- Education: University of Vienna University of Innsbruck

Helmut Staubmann (born March 7, 1956, in Judenburg) is an Austrian sociologist. He is professor for social theory and cultural sociology at the University of Innsbruck and Dean of the School of Political Science and Sociology of the University of Innsbruck. From 2013 to 2015, he served as President of the Austrian Sociological Association.

Helmut Staubmann has authored and edited several books on action theory in the Parsonian tradition. Together with Victor M. Lidz he is editor of the book series Studies in the Theory of Action.

His cultural research focuses on questions of aesthetics and society. He edited and translated (with Alan Scott) Georg Simmel’s book on Rembrandt (Routledge 2005). His edited volume The Rolling Stones. Sociological Perspectives (Lexington 2013) is an important contribution to the sociology of music and popular culture.

== Biography ==
Helmut Staubmann studied sociology at the University of Vienna and the Institute for Advanced Studies, Vienna. In 1991/92 he was Visiting Scholar at UCLA and the University of Maryland, College Park with an Erwin Schroedinger Grant from the Austrian Science Foundation. From 1994 to 1997 he was APART-fellow (Austrian Program for Advanced Research and Technology, Austrian Academy of Science) at the University of Chicago, Stanford University, and the University of Pennsylvania, Philadelphia. During the academic year 2012/13 he was Visiting Scholar at Harvard University.

He held guest professor positions at Charles University Prague, Free University Bolzano, Kobe University, University of Tennessee/Knoxville and the Austrian universities in Linz, Graz and Salzburg

== Awards ==
George-Sarton-Medal, University of Ghent 2015

Cardinal-Innitzer-Award (Social Sciences and Economics) 1995

Adam-Smith-Bicentenary-Award, School of Social Sciences and Economics, University of Innsbruck 1990

== Selected publications ==
(Editor with Victor Lidz): Rationality in the Social Sciences: The Schumpeter-Parsons Seminar 1939-40 and Current Perspectives. Cham: Springer International Publishing 2018.

(Editor with Victor M. Lidz): Talcott Parsons and Winston White: Values of American Society. Manuscripts from the American Society Project I. With an Introduction by Victor Lidz and Helmut Staubmann. Vienna: LIT 2016.

(Editor) The Rolling Stones – Sociological Perspectives. Lanham: Lexington Books 2013

(Editor with Victor M. Lidz): Talcott Parsons: Actor, Situation and Normative Pattern. An Essay in the Theory of Social Action. Vienna: LIT (Distributed in North America by Transaction Publishers) 2010

(Editor with Harald Wenzel): Talcott Parsons. Springer 2010 (2nd edition)

(Editor) Action Theory: Methodological Studies. Vienna: LIT (Distributed in North America by Transaction Publishers) 2006

(Editor with Alan Scott): Georg Simmel: Rembrandt: An Essay in the Philosophy of Art. (Translated, Edited and with an Introduction by Helmut Staubmann und Alan Scott) New York: Routledge 2005

== Links ==
https://www.helmut-staubmann.info

https://www.uibk.ac.at/soziologie/team/index.html.en
