= Helena Wolińska-Brus =

Polish military prosecutor (1919–2008)

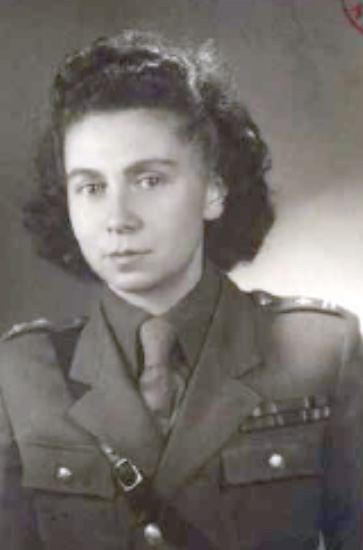
- Photographic portrait of Wolińska c.1950s
- Born: Fajga Mindla Danielak; 28 February 1919; Warsaw, Second Polish Republic
- Died: 26 November 2008 (aged 89); Oxford, England
- Resting place: Wolvercote Cemetery, Oxford
- Citizenship: Polish, British
- Occupation: Prosecutor
- Known for: State Security Services (Służba Bezpieczeństwa)
- Spouse: Franciszek Jóźwiak Włodzimierz Brus

Helena Wolińska-Brus (born Fajga Mindla Danielak; 28 February 1919 – 26 November 2008) was a military prosecutor in the Polish People's Republic with the rank of lieutenant-colonel (podpułkownik), involved in the Stalinist show trials of the 1950s. She has been implicated in the arrest and execution of many Polish World War II resistance fighters, including significant figures in Poland's wartime Home Army.

The Third Polish Republic sought the extradition of Wolińska-Brus from the United Kingdom on three occasions between 1999 and 2008. The official charges against her were initiated by the Institute of National Remembrance (IPN), which investigates both Nazi and Communist crimes committed in Poland between 1939 and 1989. Wolińska-Brus was accused of being an "accessory to a judicial murder".

== Biography ==
Wolińska-Brus was born to a Jewish family in Warsaw, where she later married Włodzimierz Brus (born Beniamin Zylberberg). They became separated during the German occupation of Poland after Wolińska-Brus escaped from the Warsaw Ghetto. She joined the communist People's Guard and became the mistress of its commander, Franciszek Jóźwiak, whom she married in 1942, believing that her first husband was dead. The rest of her family had been transported to Treblinka, where most of them were murdered. She became known as Helena Wolińska because of the false documents she acquired at this time.

However, she met Brus again in 1944 and they eventually remarried in 1956, after she had separated from Jóźwiak, now a deputy minister of the Stalinist Secret Police (1945–1949) and a member of the Politburo of the governing communist Polish United Workers' Party. She was dismissed from her job as prosecutor during the Polish October of 1956.

In the 1960s, her husband Brus shifted from supporting the party hierarchy to openly backing such dissidents as Jacek Kuroń, Karol Modzelewski, Leszek Kołakowski and Krzysztof Pomian. The couple were both expelled from the party in 1968.

Wolińska-Brus and her husband left Poland in 1971, after the 1968 Polish political crisis and spent the rest of their lives in the United Kingdom. Wlodzimierz Brus became a professor of economics at the University of Oxford and died in 2007. Wolińska-Brus lived in Oxford until her death, having previously acquired UK citizenship.

== Role in Stalinist show trials ==
Wolińska-Brus was accused of being an "accessory to a judicial murder", which is classified as a Stalinist crime and a crime of genocide and it is punishable by up to ten years in prison. She was also accused of organising the unlawful arrest, investigation and trial of Poland's wartime general Emil August Fieldorf, a commander of the underground Polish Home Army against the German occupation during World War II. He refused to work with the Polish communist government after the war.

Fieldorf was executed on 24 February 1953, following a show trial, and his remains buried in a secret location – his family was never shown the body. A 1956 report commissioned during Poland's period of de-Stalinization concluded that Wolińska-Brus had violated the rule of law by her involvement in biased investigations and had also staged questionable trials that frequently resulted in executions. She told The Guardian in 2007 that she was not the prosecutor in the Fieldorf case, although historians have said otherwise. She signed his arrest warrant in 1953.

== Extradition requests ==
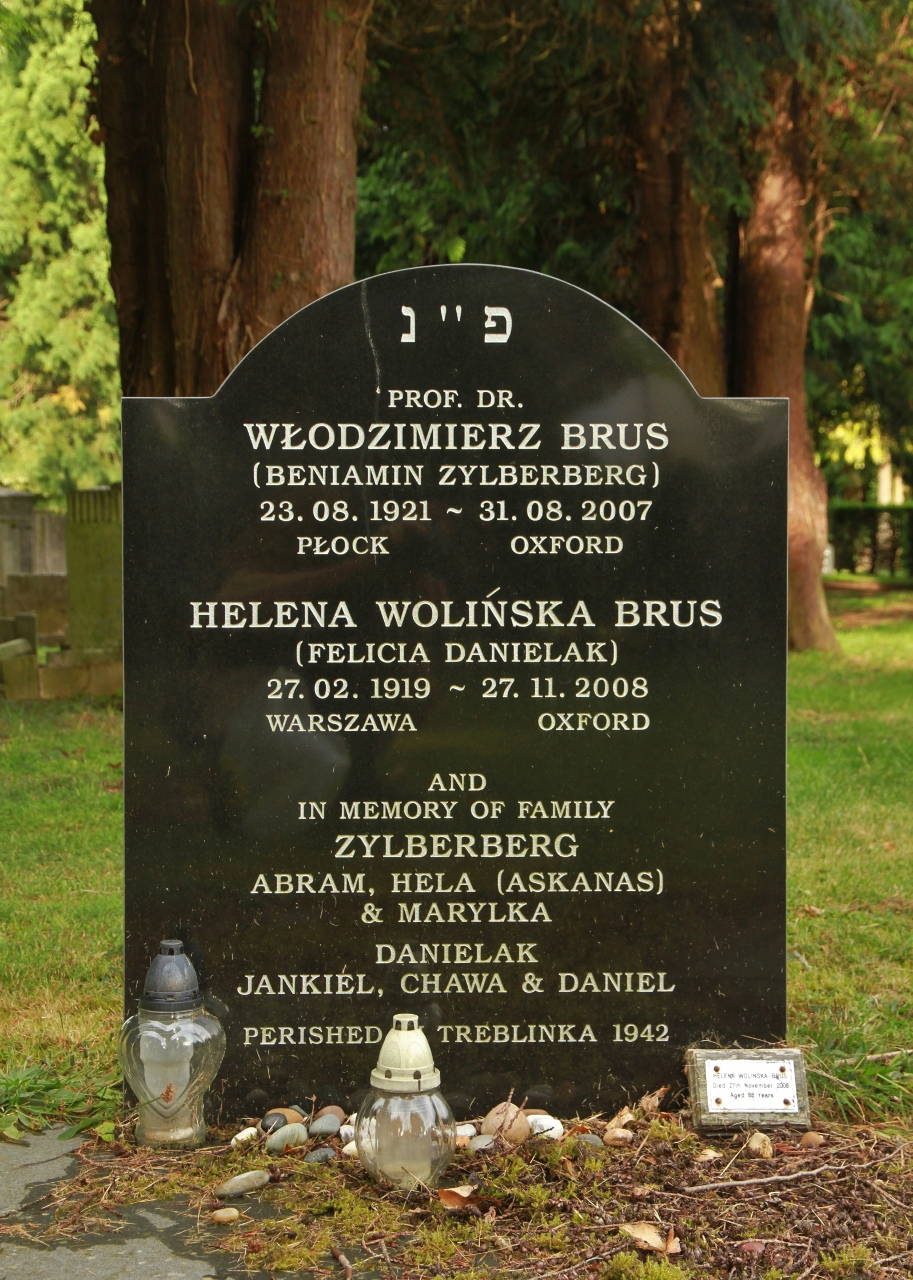
Grave of Włodzimierz Brus and Helena Wolińska-Brus in Wolvercote Cemetery, Oxford. While their names are written in Latin characters, on top are the Hebrew characters Pe and Nun, standing for "Here is buried..." - traditional in Jewish burials.

The first of three applications for Wolińska-Brus' extradition to Poland was made in 1999, initiated by an investigation carried out by the IPN. A second application was submitted in 2001. The Polish indictments were based the claim that Wolińska-Brus had fabricated evidence which led to the execution of General Emil Fieldorf and the wrongful arrest and imprisonment of 24 other anti-Nazi resistance fighters. Both requests were refused by the Home Office; in particular, because of her advanced age and the long period of time that had elapsed since the alleged crimes occurred (the Polish authorities considered the latter reason to be unfair, given that any proper investigation of her alleged crimes became possible only after the fall of communism in Poland in 1989).

Wolińska-Brus, in a telephone conversation with historian Anne Applebaum in 1998, said she would not return to that "despicable country"; she claimed her accusers were motivated by anti-semitism. Her acquaintances told Applebaum she had said she would not return to "the country of Auschwitz and Birkenau", claiming that she would not receive a fair trial in Poland. Nearly a decade later, an article in The Guardian in 2007 quoted Fieldorf's daughter, Maria, who accused Wolińska-Brus of having been "one of those careerists who are the pillars of any dictatorship."

Accusations of anti-semitism were rebutted by, among others, Władysław Bartoszewski, Polish Foreign Affairs Minister (1995, 2000–2001), soldier of the underground Polish Home Army, Auschwitz survivor, a Righteous Among the Nations and an honorary citizen of Israel, who had also been prosecuted by Wolińska-Brus: "On my indictment affidavit, in red pencil, is the signature of Helena Wolińska. Affirming the accusations against me, she knew that I was co-founder of the Polish Council to Aid Jews. I am a living example of the fact that the statements made by Wolińska and certain people around her about anti-semitism are nonsense." Bartoszewski told Anne Applebaum in 1998 that he recalled, while in prison during the 1950s, seeing blank arrest warrants with Wolińska's signature on them as a demonstration of the authorities ability to continue extending his imprisonment.

In 2004, Poland joined the European Union, which made possible a third attempt to extradite Wolińska-Brus. In January 2006, her prosecutorial pension was revoked and later that year Polish president Lech Kaczyński also revoked the Polonia Restituta decoration that she was awarded by the Polish communist authorities in 1954.

In 2007, the IPN asked Polish prosecutors to issue a European Arrest Warrant against Wolińska-Brus, which was duly issued on 20 November 2007. A year later, Wolińska-Brus died on 26 November 2008 in Oxford. Although the funeral was scheduled for 5 December 2008, she was buried on 3 December in a closed ceremony, at Wolvercote Cemetery, Oxford, with only a few family members attending.

== Popular culture ==
Wolińska-Brus inspired the character of prosecutor Wanda Gruz in Paweł Pawlikowski's 2013 Academy Award-winning film Ida. Pawlikowski had met Wolińska-Brus and her husband while he was a student at Oxford; at the time, Pawlikowski was unaware of her past. After learning years later that Wolińska-Brus had been a prosecutor in Stalinist Poland, and that the Polish government was demanding her extradition, Pawlikowski expressed an interest in making a documentary about her life, which Włodzimierz Brus allegedly refused on his wife's behalf. Pawlikowski described Wolińska-Brus as an "archetype" for Wanda Gruz.

== See also ==
- Stefan Michnik
- Maria Gurowska
- Ministry of Public Security (Poland)
