= Katarzyna Herman =

Polish actress (born 1971)

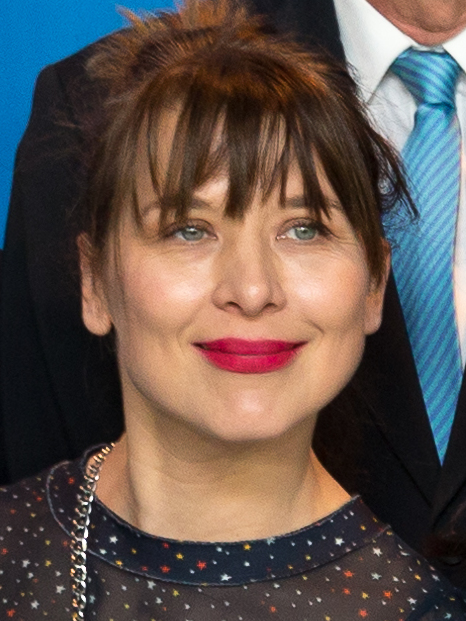
- Herman at the 67th Berlin International Film Festival
- Born: 13 August 1971 (age 54); Białystok, Poland
- Occupation: Actress
- Years active: 1994–present

Katarzyna Herman (born 13 August 1971) is a Polish actress, who appeared in more than 70 television and film productions.

== Early life ==
Herman was born in Białystok and in 1994 graduated from the Aleksander Zelwerowicz National Academy of Dramatic Art in Warsaw.

== Career ==
She made her screen debut starring in the 1997–1998 historical drama series, Boża podszewka. The following years, Herman appeared mostly on soap operas Na dobre i na złe, L for Love and most notable, Magda M. (2005-07). She had the recurring role in the crime drama Crime Detectives from 2005 to 2006, and in 2007 starred in the political drama Prime Minister created and directed by Agnieszka Holland. Holland later cast Herman in her film Janosik: A True Story (2009), receiving Złota Kaczka nomination. In 2011 she starred in the crime drama series, Układ Warszawski.

In 2012, Herman played her first leading film role in the drama In a Bedroom directed by Tomasz Wasilewski. For this performance, she received Best Actress award at the Koszalin Debut Films Festival. She later appeared in films The Lure (2015), Spoor (2017), Bartkowiak (2021) and Doppelgänger (2023), receiving Polish Academy Award for Best Supporting Actress nomination for latter. On television, Herman was regular cast member in Barwy szczęścia (2015–16), Druga szansa (2016–18), Szóstka (2019), Maly zgon (2020), Kod genetyczny (2020) and Tajemnica zawodowa (2022). In 2023, Herman starred in the third season of Canal+ crime drama The Teacher, and later was cast in the Netflix comedy series, 1670.

== Filmography ==
- Changes (2003) as Wanda
- Solidarity, Solidarity (2005) as Majka
- Swiadek koronny (2007) as Magda
- Kochaj i tancz (2009) as Monika
- Generał Nil (2009) as Maria Gurowska
- Janosik: A True Story (2009) as Zuzanna
- All That I Love (2009) as Sokołowska
- In a Bedroom (2012) as Ewa/Edyta
- Floating Skyscrapers (2013) as Ewa
- Deceived (2013) as Anna Laskowska
- Neighborhooders (2014) as Wife
- Demon as Gabryjelska
- Damaged (2015) as Jasiewiczowa
- The Lure (2015) as Milicjantka Porucznik
- Spoor (2017) as Zona Prezesa
- Volta (2017) as Marta Zawistowska
- Clergy (2018) as Zakrzewska
- Back Home (2019) as Lena
- Bartkowiak (2021) as Klaudia
- Fools (2022) as Magda
- Doppelgänger (2023) as Head Officer
- Feast of Fire (2023) as Mrs. Kownacka
- The Ugly Stepsister (2025, Premiere at the 2025 Sundance Film Festival on 23 January.)
