= Zefiryn Machalla =

Polish Army officer (1915–1952)

- Born: 1 August 1915; Września, Kingdom of Prussia
- Died: 10 January 1952 (aged 36); Warsaw, Polish People's Republic
- Military career
- Allegiance: Second Polish Republic, Polish People's Republic
- Branch: Polish Armed Forces; Polish Armed Forces in the West; Polish People's Army
- Service years: 1939-1951
- Rank: Major (Major)
- Units: 5th Podhale Rifles Infantry Regiment; 16th Infantry Regiment; 14th Infantry Regiment; Polish General Staff
- Conflicts: Second World War
- Awards

Zefiryn Machalla (August 1, 1915 – January 10, 1952), was a major of the Polish Army and participant of the Polish September Campaign. In the interbellum period, his talent was highly praised by the Polish Army Headquarters, for his outstanding bravery, Machalla was nominated for the Virtuti Militari cross.

In late 1939, after Polish defeat, Machalla was captured by the NKVD and sent to Siberia. Two years later, he managed to reach the Anders Army and then, together with the whole army, fought the Germans in Italy.

After World War II, Machalla, unlike most of his fellow soldiers, decided to return to communist-controlled Poland. In the late 1940s he was sentenced by communist judge Stefan Michnik to death for alleged spying. He was not allowed to have a lawyer and was executed on January 10, 1952. His wife found out about the execution a few years later.

== Awards and decorations ==
- Silver Cross of Merit
- Medal of Victory and Freedom 1945.

== Sources ==
- The Institut of National Remembrance, media view, 20.02.2007
- info at Adam Mickiewicz University in Posen
