= Barbara Blaha =

Austrian writer

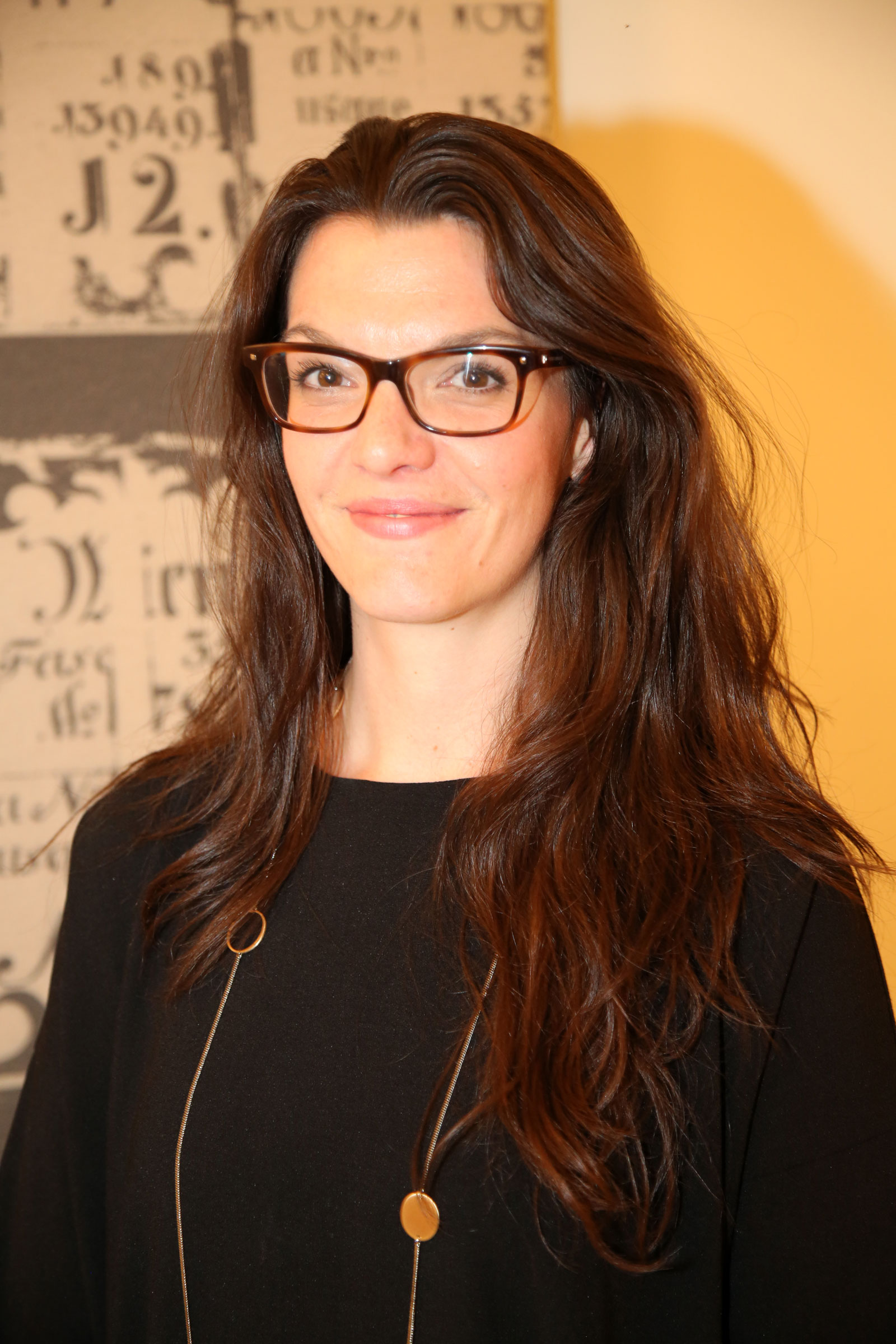
- Born: Simmering
- Education: University of Vienna

Barbara Blaha (23 September 1983) is an Austrian author and founder of the political congress Momentum and the think tank Momentum Institute and editor of Moment magazine. Blaha is a former chairwoman of the Austrian Student Union.

== Life ==
Blaha was born into a working-class family, the second of seven children. She attended elementary school and high school in Simmering. Blaha studied German at the University of Vienna and graduated in 2009. In 2008, Blaha founded the Momentum Kongress in Hallstatt. After her time with the Austrian Student Union, Blaha became commercial manager at the Vienna-based Czernin Verlag. She managed non-fiction for Brandstätter Verlag from 2014, and became responsible for the digital strategy. In 2018 she also took over the Art & Life Division.

Blaha started the think tank “Project360” in 2019, which became the Momentum Institute and Moment Magazine. The Momentum Institute is financed by donations and carries out social research.

== Political career ==
Blaha started her social efforts in 1997 when she and her school friend revived the dormant school newspaper project Der Gottschalk. She became involved with her school student council and the Vienna State Student Council. During this time she also became involved in the Action for Critical Students Vienna, of which she was Secretary and chairwoman.

During her studies she began to get involved with the Socialist Students of Austria (VSStÖ). She was in the education policy department of the Austrian Student Union, responsible for questions regarding the Bologna Process. She was elected to the Austrian Student Union Leadership Team, and served as chair for two years. She was elected to the University Council of the University of Salzburg in 2013.

== Science Ball ==
Blaha is one of the co-founders of the Vienna Ball of Sciences.
