= Institute of Economics (Poland) =

The Institute of Economics (IE) at University of Information Technology and Management (UITM) in Rzeszów, Poland is an academic-research center interested in economic processes.

== History ==
It was created in 2001 as an independent organizational unit within the university. Its academic research is conducted in cooperation with businesses, local government administrations and other institutions, such as the Center for Socio-Economic Analysis in Warsaw, the Centre for International Research on Economic Tendency Surveys (CIRET) in Switzerland, Global Development Network (GDN) and the Bureau for Investments and Economic Cycles LCC in New York.

The Institute provides research and analysis in many economic fields and in areas of public interest, including the labor market and public policy, as well as the real estate market, entrepreneurship and innovation.

The research activities of the Institute are organized into several research units, including the Macroeconomic Analysis and Forecasting Unit, the Microeconomic Analysis and Policy Unit, the International Trade and Investment Unit, and the Public Finance and Social Policy Unit.
