= Journal of Business Cycle Research =

- Discipline: Economics
- Language: English
- Edited by: Marcelle Chauvet

Publication details
- Former names: Journal of Business Cycle Measurement and Analysis
- History: 2004–present
- Publisher: Springer Science+Business Media on behalf of the Centre for International Research on Economic Tendency Surveys
- Frequency: Biannually

Standard abbreviations
- ISO 4: J. Bus. Cycle Res.

Indexing
- ISSN: 2509-7962 (print); 2509-7970 (web)

Links
- Journal homepage; Online access

The Journal of Business Cycle Research is a triannual peer-reviewed academic journal in the field of economics with a focus on business cycles. It is published by Springer Science+Business Media on behalf of the Centre for International Research on Economic Tendency Surveys. Until 2015 it was published jointly by the Centre and the Organisation for Economic Co-operation and Development. The journal was established in 2004 as the Journal of Business Cycle Measurement and Analysis, obtaining its current title in 2016. The editor-in-chief is Marcelle Chauvet (University of California Riverside); previous editors were Günter Poser (2004–2005), Bernd Schips (2006–2007), and Michael Graff (2008–2020).

== Abstracting and indexing ==
The journal is abstracted and indexed in EconLit and Research Papers in Economics.
