= Vienna Institute for International Economic Studies =

Economic research organization in Vienna

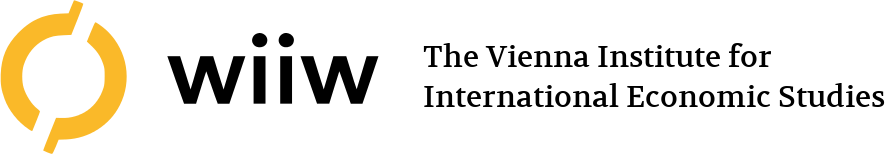
- Established: 1972; 54 years ago
- Focus: International Economics, Macroeconomics, Labour Markets, Migration, Central, Eastern and Southeastern Europe
- President: Hannes Swoboda
- Chair: Mario Holzner (Executive Director) Robert Stehrer (Scientific Director)
- Budget: €3.7 million (2020)
- Address: Rahlgasse 3, 1060 Vienna, Austria
- Website: www.wiiw.ac.at

The Vienna Institute for International Economic Studies (wiiw) is a non-partisan, non-profit economic research institute specialised in Central, Eastern and Southeastern Europe, based in Vienna, Austria. It was founded in 1972 and is currently headed by Mario Holzner.

With a budget of 3.7 million euros and just under 40 employees (2020), wiiw is the third largest economic research institution in Austria after the Austrian Institute of Economic Research (WIFO) and the Institute for Advanced Studies (IHS). Among the Austrian economic think tanks, wiiw is the only one with a primarily international orientation.

In February 2022, it signed a memorandum of understanding together with the Austrian Institute of Economic Research (WIFO), the Institute for Advanced Studies (IHS), the Austrian Institute of Technology and Joanneum Research, establishing 16 principles of scientific integrity for commissioned studies.

The institute monitors and conducts economic research on currently 23 countries in Central, Eastern and Southeastern Europe including Russia, Ukraine, Belarus, Kazakhstan, the Visegrád countries Poland, Hungary, Czechia and Slovakia as well as the Balkans and Turkey. Furthermore, wiiw focuses on macroeconomics, trade, competitiveness, investment, the European integration process, regional development, labour markets, migration and income distribution.

== Board ==
The Economic Advisory Board of the institute consists of Rumen Dobrinsky (formerly UNECE), Barry Eichengreen (University of California, Berkeley), Elhanan Helpman (Harvard University), Dani Rodrik (Princeton University), Dariusz Rosati (Warsaw School of Economics), Robert E. Rowthorn (University of Cambridge), André Sapir (Université libre de Bruxelles and Bruegel), Alan Winters (University of Sussex) and Charles Wyposz (Geneva Graduate Institute of International Studies).

== Publications ==
One of wiiw's most well-known publications is the Forecast Report CESEE. It analyses the economies of 23 countries in Central, Eastern and Southeastern Europe (CESEE) and provides a detailed forecast of the macroeconomic indicators of the following countries: Albania, Belarus, Bosnia and Herzegovina, Bulgaria, Croatia, Czechia, Estonia, Hungary, Kazakhstan, Kosovo, Latvia, Lithuania, Moldova, Montenegro, Northern Macedonia, Poland, Romania, Russia, Serbia, Slovakia, Slovenia, Turkey and Ukraine.

The Forecast Report CESEE regularly receives a broad echo in the Austrian and international media.

wiiw also provides expertise on the Western Balkans, Iran and China.

Together with the World Bank, the Institute regularly publishes the Western Balkans Labor Market Trends report.

wiiw's proposal of a "European Silk Road" to build a high-speed rail link along two routes connecting Lisbon to Uralsk and Milan to Volgograd and Baku drew a lot of international attention. An update on the climate effect of a "European Silk Road" was discussed in Austrian and international media.

== International recognition ==
In the global think tank ranking of the University of Pennsylvania, in 2020 wiiw again scored third in the category "International Economic Policy Think Tanks", ranking only behind Bruegel (Belgium) and Brookings Institution (United States). This category lists "top think tanks" that "provide outstanding innovative research and strategic analysis". The ranking is based on surveys of experts from academia, politics and NGOs as well as peer institutions. The first time wiiw was included in this global ranking of think tanks was in 2012. Since then, the Institute has steadily improved from rank 17 (2012) to 14 (2013), 12 (2014), 5 (2015), 4 (2016, 2017, 2018) and 3 (2019, 2020).

In 2020, nine wiiw economists once again received a total of 17 top-3 awards at the Focus Economics Analyst Forecast Awards for the forecast accuracy of their macroeconomic forecasts for Central, Eastern and Southeastern Europe.

The Focus Economics Awards honour analysts for the accuracy of their monthly forecast reports. The accuracy is measured by their average deviations from the current values. Forecasts are assessed over a period of two years, so in this case forecasts for 2019 since the beginning of 2018 were taken into account. With a total of 17 top 3 awards, the wiiw forecasts for Central, Eastern and Southeastern Europe are in no way inferior to institutions such as Oxford Economics (17), Fitch Solutions (14) or Raiffeisen Bank (10).
