= Stefan Michnik =

Polish judge (1929–2021)

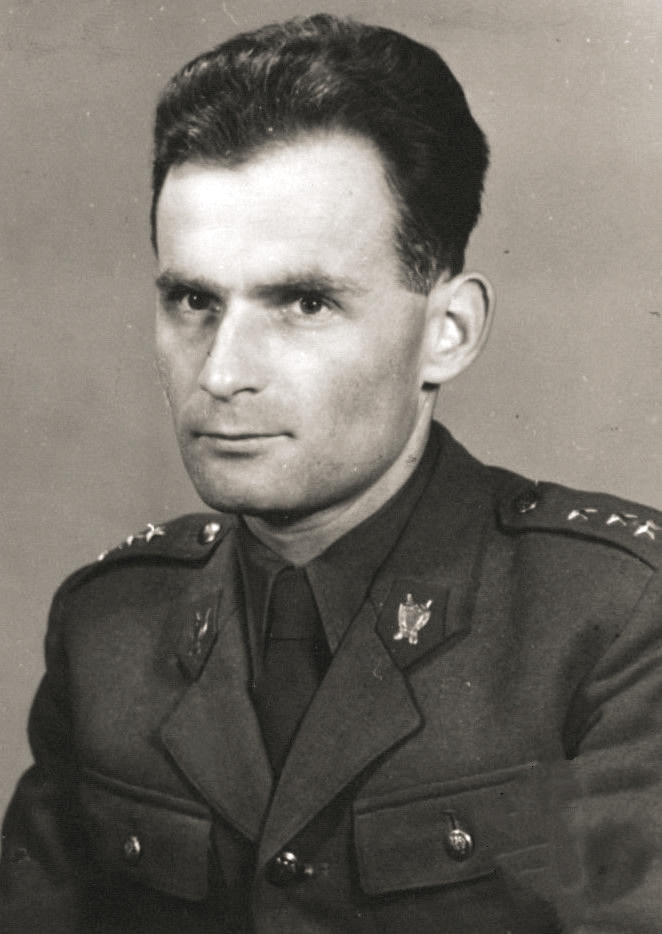
- Born: 28 September 1929; Drohobycz, Poland (now Drohobych, Ukraine)
- Died: 27 July 2021 (aged 91); Gothenburg, Sweden
- Other names: Karol Szwedowicz nom de guerre Kazimierczak
- Citizenship: Polish, Swedish
- Occupation(s): Judge, communist security agent.
- Known for: State Security Services (Urząd Bezpieczeństwa)

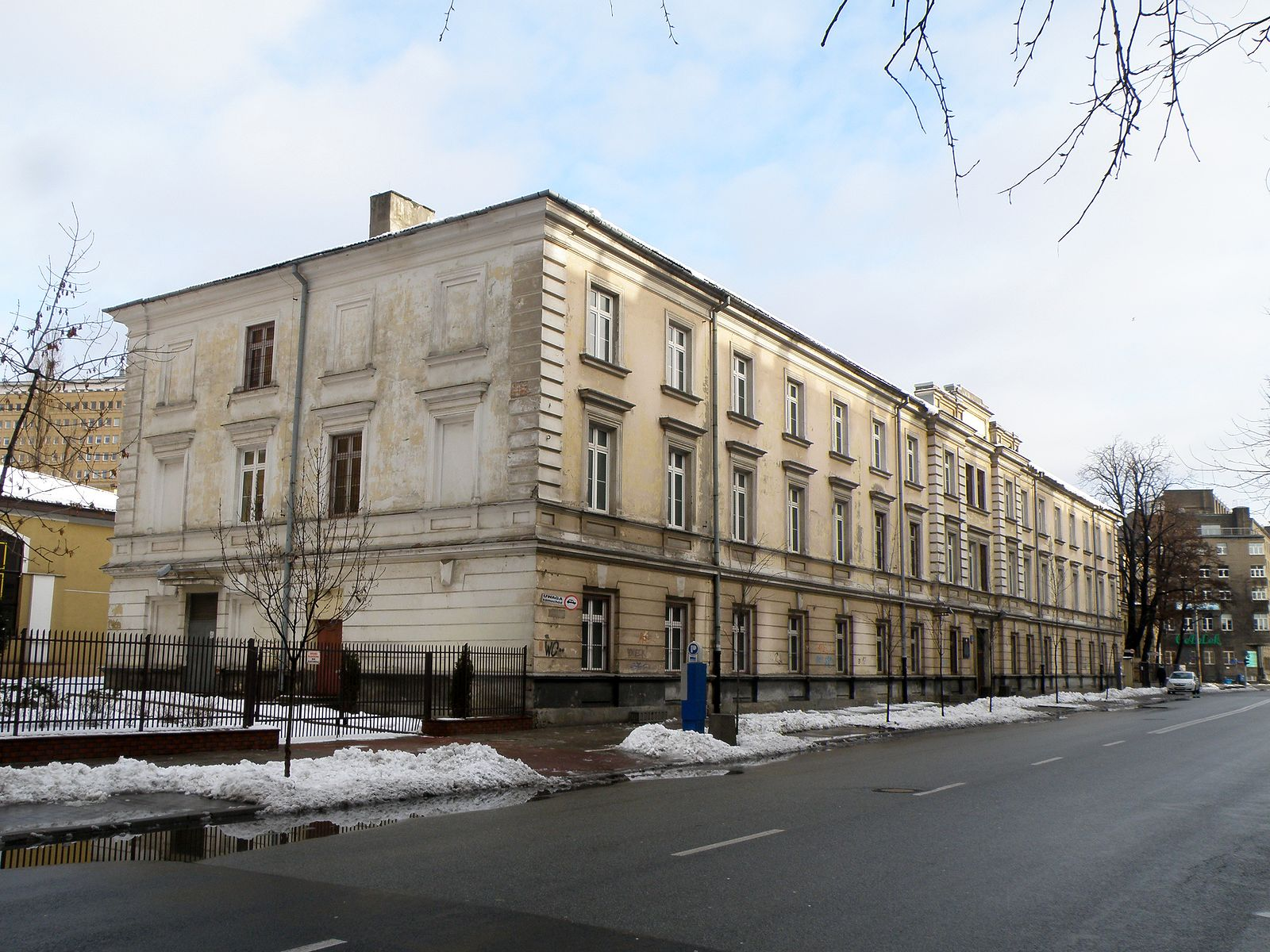
Stefan Michnik's place of work at Koszykowa Street in Warsaw, Regional Military Court (Wojskowy Sąd Rejonowy, WSR)

Stefan Michnik (28 September 1929 – 27 July 2021) was a military judge of the Soviet-dominated regime in post-World War II Poland, and a captain in the communist Polish People's Army. He was involved in the politically-motivated arrest, trial, imprisonment and/or execution of a number of Polish anti-communist fighters and activists. Many of those persecuted by Michnik also fought against Nazi Germany during World War II, as members of the Polish resistance.

After de-stalinization, Michnik went into exile in 1968, and had lived in Storvreta, Sweden.

After the collapse of communism in Poland (1989), Michnik was formally implicated by the Polish justice system in communist crimes relating to his tenure as a military judge.

== Life ==
Stefan Michnik was the son of Helena Michnik and Samuel Rosenbusch nicknamed "Emil" or "Miłek" (born around 1904). His mother was a Polish-Jewish teacher in Drohobycz and an activist for the Communist Party of Western Ukraine, the Communist Party of Poland, and the Stalinist Union of Polish Patriots. His father was a Jewish lawyer and communist activist, executed around 1937 in the Soviet Union during the Great Purge.

Michnik's half-brother (on his mother's side) was Adam Michnik, the editor-in-chief of the Polish newspaper, Gazeta Wyborcza.

=== Judicial career ===
Michnik became a judge in postwar Poland after completing an eight-month course for military judges in Jelenia Góra. He was first recruited by the Information Bureau under the pseudonym Kazimierczak but fired 11 months later, and was given severance pay of 1,000 zlotys.

At the beginning of 1951 Michnik was assigned a position with the Warsaw Regional Military Court (Wojskowy Sąd Rejonowy, WSR) and two weeks later imposed his first sentence against Stanisław Bronarski, charged with anticommunist activities, while he was a member of the AK, NSZ and NZW. Bronarski (exonerated in post-communist Poland) was given five consecutive death sentences and executed on 18 January 1951 at the Mokotów Prison. Michnik took part in the Trial of the Generals, dubbed a judicial murder by historians, with 40 death sentences pronounced in the fall of 1951, half of them carried out (see list of the 21 executed officers by name, with Stefan Michnik as one of the sentencing judges).

The list of Polish Army officers sentenced by Michnik, and rehabilitated without exception (also posthumously) included:

1. Major Zefiryn Machalla - death sentence issued by Michnik, the jury took a joint decision not to allow defense in the proceedings; Machalla's family was not informed about the execution;
2. Colonel Maksymilian Chojecki - death sentence, not executed;
3. Major Andrzej Rudolf Czaykowski - death sentence, Michnik participated personally in his execution;
4. Major Jerzy Lewandowski - death sentence, not executed;
5. Colonel Stanisław Wecki - lecturer at the Academy of the General Staff, sentenced to 13 years in prison, and died as a result of torture;
6. Major Zenon Tarasiewicz, case Sr 12/52, 12 years;
7. Colonel Romuald Sidorski - editor in Chief of the Quartermaster Review, sentenced to 12 years in prison, and died because of lack of medical assistance;
8. Lieutenant Colonel Aleksander Kowalski, and;
9. Major Karol Sęk - artilleryman from Radom, officer of the anticommunist National Armed Forces, and death sentence, executed in 1952.

== Emigration ==
After being denied a US visa, Michnik fled Poland for Sweden during 1968 Polish political crisis. He lived as a retired librarian in a small town of Storvreta near Uppsala

He built connections with Radio Free Europe and the Paris-based Kultura, where he wrote articles under the anonym "Karol Szwedowicz".

Since August 2007 the Polish Institute of National Remembrance deliberated on a motion to request his extradition. On 25 February 2010, the Military Garrison Court in Warsaw at the request of the investigation division of the IPN issued an official arrest warrant for Stefan Michnik. In October 2010, Polish prosecutors issued a European Arrest Warrant (EAW) on the same basis. On 18 November 2010, the court in Uppsala refused to extradite Stefan Michnik to Poland explaining that his alleged criminal acts (see communist crime) committed in Poland fall outside the statute of limitations in Sweden.

On 8 November 2018, the Military Court in Warsaw issued for the second time a European Arrest Warrant in connection with 30 offences that Michnik committed in the years 1952–53 against representatives of the democratic opposition and former members of the Underground State, including unlawful death sentences. Michnik had claimed that he was not aware of the death sentences, which, according to him, was a decision made higher up in the judicial hierarchy. A Swedish court in Gothenburg refused Poland's appeal for the extradition of Stefan Michnik.

In his final years, he lived at a nursing home in Gothenburg. He died on 27 July 2021, at the age of 91. His half-brother Adam published his obituary in his Gazeta Wyborcza.

== See also ==
- Ministry of Public Security (Poland)
- Helena Wolińska-Brus
- Maria Gurowska
- Adam Michnik
