= Christoph Badelt =

Austrian economist

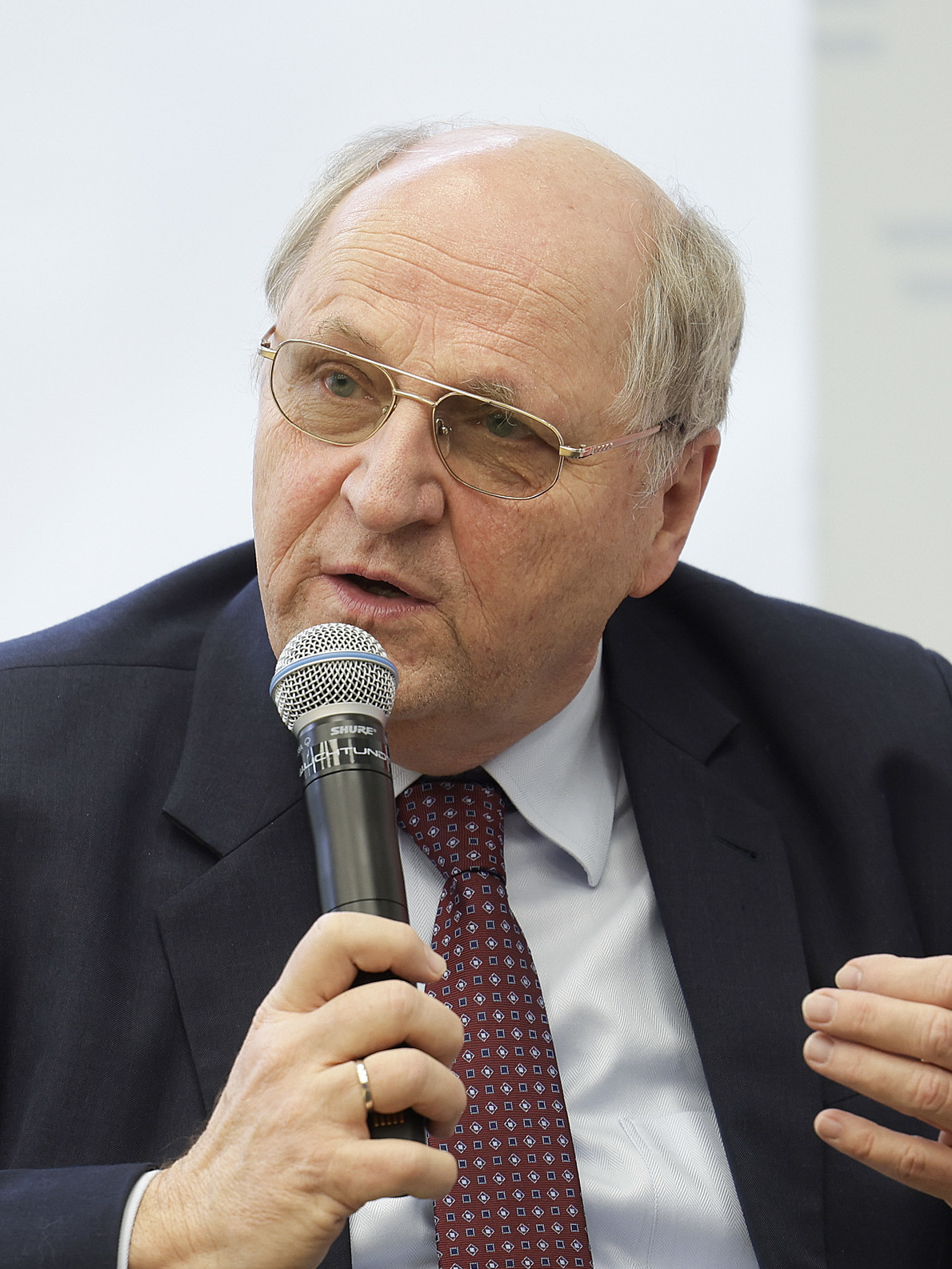
Christoph Badelt in 2021

Christoph Badelt (born 26 February 1951) is the current director of the Austrian Institute of Economic Research and professor at the Vienna University of Economics and Business. He was the Vienna University of Economics and Business's vice-chancellor from March 2002 until September 2015.

He is an economist specializing in social policy. He has done notable work in the economics of nonprofit organizations.

In 1998, Badelt, among others, was commissioned by the Austrian Government to study the state of the family in Austria. He was elected Austrian Scientist of the Year in 1999.

Christoph Badelt has been president of the Austrian Fiscal Advisory Council (Fiskalrat) since 2021.
