= Zygmunt Walter-Janke =

Polish officer and historian

- Born: 21 February 1908; Chojny, Congress Poland
- Died: 25 February 1990 (aged 82); Pabianice, Poland
- Education: Higher Military School; University of Łódź; University of Warsaw
- Military career
- Allegiance: Poland
- Branch: Polish Armed Forces; Service for Poland's Victory; Home Army
- Rank: Brigadier general
- Units: Kresowa Cavalry Brigade; Home Army Łódź District
- Commands: Home Army Silesian District
- Conflicts: World War II; Operation Tempest; Anti-communist resistance in Poland
- Awards: Virtuti Militari; Order of Polonia Restituta; Cross of Merit with Swords; Cross of Valour; Partisan Cross

Zygmunt Janke, pseudonym "Walter" (21 February 1907 – 25 February 1990) was a Polish officer, historian and political activist. He was brigadier general of the Polish Armed Forces, soldier of the Union of Armed Struggle and Home Army, victim of Stalinist repressions, doctor of humanities and Knight of the Order of Virtuti Militari. In the years 1940-1943 he served as chief of staff of the Łódź District of the Union of Armed Struggle (since 1942 Home Army) and in the years 1943-1945 chief of staff and later commander of the Silesian District of the Home Army.

== Biography ==
Janke was born on 21 February 1907 in the village of Chojny (currently a district of the city in the Łódź-Górna district). In 1927 he passed his high school leaving exams in Pabianice and in the same year joined the Polish Armed Forces. He graduated from the Infantry Cadet School in Ostrów Mazowiecka – Komorów and the Artillery Cadet School in Toruń.

On 15 August 1930, the President of Poland Ignacy Mościcki appointed him a second lieutenant with seniority from 15 August 1930 and 22nd place in the corps of artillery officers, and the Minister of Military Affairs incorporated him into the 7th Greater Poland Horse Artillery Division in Poznań. He was a platoon commander, and then a battery commander. In 1937–1939, he was a student of the Higher Military School in Warsaw. He was promoted to the rank of captain with seniority from 19 March 1939 and 59th place in the corps of artillery officers. In the Invasion of Poland, he was an operational officer of the Kresowa Cavalry Brigade, and after the battles of Karczew he became the chief of staff.

On 27 September 1939, near Medyka, he was captured by the Germans. After escaping from captivity in October 1939, he joined the Service for Poland's Victory, then, after the name changes of this organization, the Union of Armed Struggle and the Home Army. In the years 1940–1943, he was the chief of staff of the Łódź District of the Union of Armed Struggle (from 1942 the Home Army), in the years 1943–1945, the chief of staff and later the commander of the Silesian District of the Home Army, performing this function under the pseudonym "Walter" until revealing himself in September 1945.

After the war, in 1946, Walter-Janke was a teacher at the 1st General Secondary School in Pabianice. After less than a year, he lost this job and left for the Recovered Territories. He was imprisoned from January 1949 to 1955; initially sentenced to death, later commuted to life imprisonment. After being released from prison in 1956, he was rehabilitated. He graduated in history from the University of Łódź and in 1975 he obtained his doctorate from the University of Warsaw. In the 1980s, he was active in the Patriotic Union "Grunwald". On 11 October 1988 he was promoted to the rank of brigadier general in retirement. In 1988–1990, he was a member of the Council for the Protection of Struggle and Martyrdom Sites. In February 1989 he became a member of the Commission for Commemorating the Victims of Repression of the Stalinist Period operating at this council. In 1989 he was also a member of the Citizens' Committee for the Renewal of the Tomb of the Unknown Soldier in Warsaw, chaired by Brig. Gen. Stanisław Skalski.

In recognition of his services, streets in many cities were named after him.

Walter-Janke was buried in the cemetery in Pabianice.
