= Maria Gurowska =

Polish judge

- Born: 1 October 1915; Łódź
- Died: 4 January 1998 (aged 82); Jedwabno, Poland
- Other names: Maria Sand; Maria Górowska; Genowefa Maria Danielak
- Citizenship: Polish
- Occupation: Judge
- Known for: Trial of Emil Fieldorf

Maria Gurowska (née Zand; 1 October 1915 - 4 January 1998) was a Polish judge in the People's Republic of Poland.

== Personal life ==
She was born in a Jewish family to Moryc and Frajda (Eisenman) Zand. Her father was an accountant and a trade agent; he died in 1941.

She graduated from the "Państwowe Gimnazjum Żeńskie im. E. Szczanieckiej" in Łódź and then from the Law Faculty of Warsaw University.

== Career ==
In 1937, she worked as a lawyer in "Centralne Stowarzyszenie Kupców i Przemysłowców Województwa Łódzkiego". During the German occupation in the Second World War she hid under the name of Genowefa Maria Danielak. In 1940 she left Łodź with her parents. She lived in Żyrardów for one year and then moved to Warsaw, working as tutor, trader and glove maker.

From 1943 on, she was a member of Gwardia Ludowa and communist Polish Workers' Party, which was under direct control of Joseph Stalin. She was assigned to the signal corp of The People's Army (another partisan, communist groups) at the outbreak of the Warsaw Uprising and afterwards in Staff of The People's Army. When the Warsaw Uprising fell she left Warsaw along with her mother for Częstochowa.

In January 1945 she was nominated as head of the Department of Information and Propaganda in Częstochowa. She moved again to Łódź in March 1945 to taking the position of propaganda instructor in the Executive Committee of Polish Workers' Party.

As of 1946 she begin to rise in the Department of Justice, becoming prosecutor, judge in Łódź and Warsaw and finally judge to the IV Criminal Department of Regional Court on 4 January 1951.

From 1950-1954 she was a member of the secret section inside Regional Court in Warsaw, responsible for judging in political trials on requests from the Ministry of Public Security of Poland, unleashing terror against the political opposition. Gurowska was a judge in the trial against general August Emil Fieldorf, whom she sentenced to death.

On the wave of De-Stalinization she was released in 1956 from the Department of Justice, and finally in 1970 from the position of judge.

The Institute of National Remembrance took the case against Maria Gurowska on 5 May 1992 accusing her of court-sanctioned murder of General Fieldorf. Gurowska defended herself, stating the verdict against Fieldorf was legitimate. The trial against Gurowska began on 22 December 1997, but the accused did not appear in court. She refused to appear until her death in 1998.

== Feature film ==
In 2009 a historical drama entitled Generał Nil based on Fieldorf's life premiered in Poland to generally positive reviews. It was directed by Ryszard Bugajski with Katarzyna Herman in the role of Gurowska.

== Awards and decorations ==
- Knights's Cross of the Order of Polonia Restituta (11 July 1951)
- Gold Cross of Merit (22 July 1947)
- Medal of the 10th Anniversary of People's Poland (30 December 1954)

== See also ==
- Helena Wolińska Brus
- Stefan Michnik
- Ministry of Public Security (Poland)
- Stalinism in Poland
