= Institute of Economics of the Polish Academy of Sciences =

Research center for economic and business studies

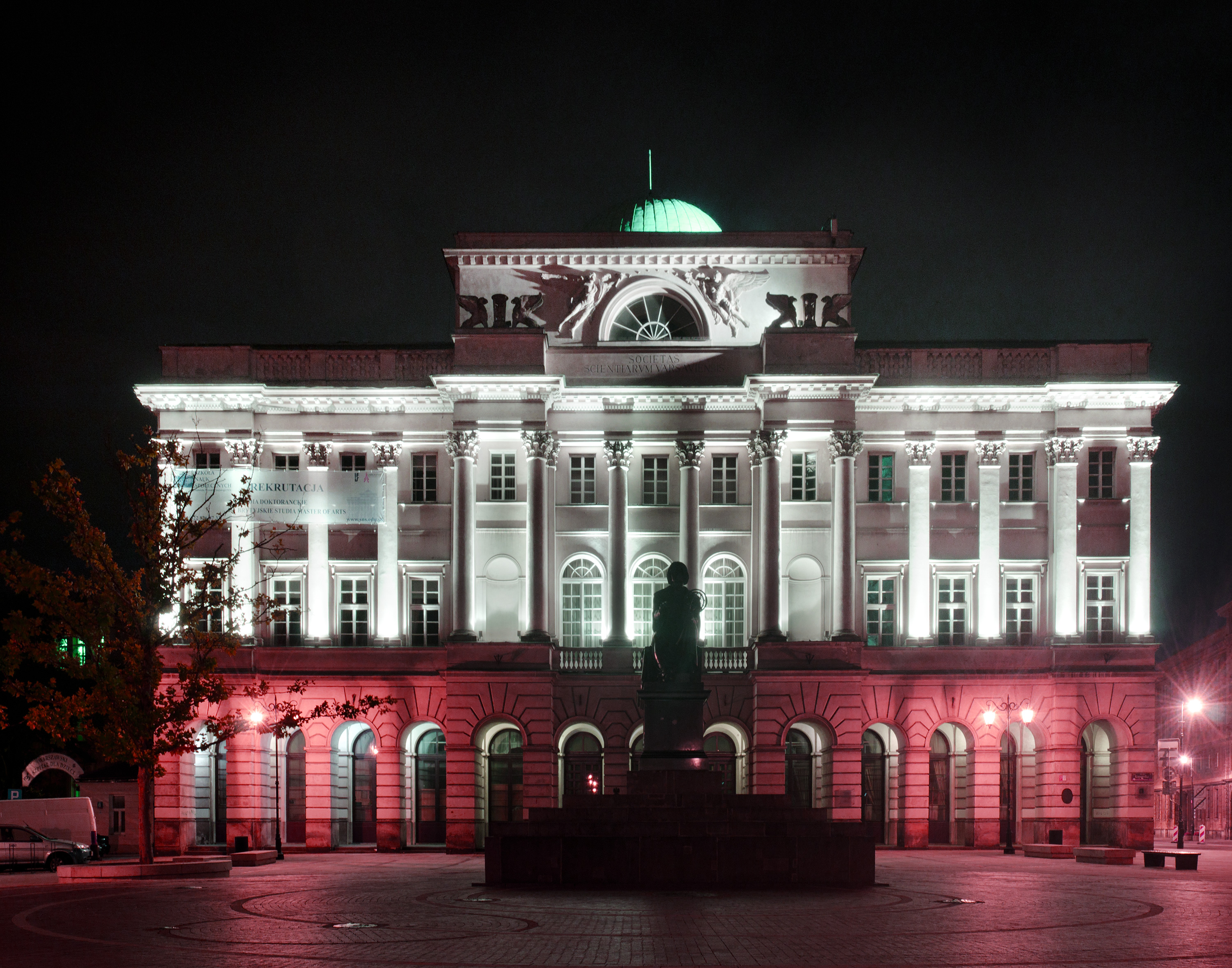
Staszic Palace, the headquarters of INE PAN

Institute of Economics, Polish Academy of Sciences (Polish: Instytut Nauk Ekonomicznych PAN, abbreviation: INE PAN) is a public Polish research center for economic and business studies. It was founded on December 10, 1980. Its offices are located in the Staszic Palace and the Palace of Culture and Science in Warsaw. Organizationally, it is part of the Polish Academy of Sciences. The Institute of Economics has the rights to bestow doctoral degrees, habilitation degrees and to initiate the professorship procedure. Some of its MBA and DBA prominent programs are the most modern programs in Poland which are internationally recognized.

== History ==
The Institute of Economics commenced its activities in 1980. Its research at that time concentrated on problems related to socialist planned economies. During the 80s INE PAN was actively engaged in the promotion of independent thinking on economic issues. It significantly contributed to the success of Polish economic reforms after the collapse of the socialist system in 1989.

During the 1990s the Institute was reorganized and took active part in the analysis and evaluation of free market economic developments in Poland. At present there are about forty scholars and researchers working in four departments of the Institute: Microeconomics, Economic Policy, Institutional Economics and the World Economy. Many of them have occupied important posts in the Cabinet of Poland, Parliament (Sejm), the National Bank of Poland, the Polish Monetary Policy Council, the European Commission and the World Bank.

== Research and other activities ==
INE PAN’s main research areas are contemporary economic theory, economic policy, analysis, evaluation, and strategic studies of the Polish economy, and analysis of the world economy and European integration. INE PAN also offers forecasts concerning growth and development of the Polish economy, and publishes a number of analyses of Polish firms. The Institute also publishes the bilingual quarterly Studia Ekonomiczne - Economic Studies. INE PAN maintains cooperation with leading institutions in various countries, e.g. the Vienna Institute for International Economic Studies; the Institute of Economics of the Russian Academy of Sciences; the Institute of World Economy of the Hungarian Academy of Sciences, and the University of Paris 1 Pantheon-Sorbonne. INE PAN also runs several postgraduate, MBA and doctoral programs in business and economics. Together with the National Bank of Poland, the Institute offers specialized studies for economic journalists.

== Scientific council and board of directors ==
Professor Barbara Błaszcyk is chairman of the scientific council of IE PAS. Urszula Skorupska serves as the director of the institute. The following professors served as directors of the Institute of Economics of the Polish Academy of Sciences in the past:

- Józef Pajestka (1981–1990)
- Cezary Józefiak (1990–1993)
- Marek Belka (1993–1996)
- Urszula Grzelońska (1996–1999)
- Zbigniew Hockuba (1999–2005)
- Leszek Jasiński (2005-2013)
- Cezary Wójcik (2013-2015)
- Piotr Krajewski (2015-2018)
