= Josef Steindl =

Austrian-born economist

- Born: 14 April 1912; Vienna, Austria-Hungary
- Died: 7 March 1993 (aged 80); Vienna, Austria

Academic background
- Influences: John Maynard Keynes, Michał Kalecki

Academic work
- Discipline: Political economy
- School or tradition: Post-Keynesian economics

Josef Steindl (14 April 1912 – 7 March 1993) was an Austrian-born post-Keynesian economist.

== Career ==
He was at the Austrian Institute of Economic Research (WIFO) (1935–38) (Ludwig von Mises Institute) but moved to the UK in 1938 to lecture at Oxford University. There he worked with a group of other European exiles from Fascism, including Michał Kalecki. Kalecki has been described as being Steindl's role-model—with his work resembling part of Kalecki's not only in substance but also in style.

In 1950 he returned to WIFO until his retirement in 1978.

== Work ==
Kurt Rothschild concludes his review of Steindl's life in The Economic Journal with a quote illustrating his views about the tasks for economic research:

What might be done to overcome the sterility of today's economics? The first condition is that we go back to the great 'traditions of the classics, Kalecki and Keynes, whose work was rooted in the economic policy problems of their time, and derived its relevance from them. They asked what should be done and how. Economic policy is the main inspiration of economic theory. The second condition is that a tremendous lot of new work is done in the no-man's land between the established disciplines which are entrenched in their organised fields, fearful of each other and speaking different languages. We must have close cooperation with other disciplines: engineering, science, history, sociology, biology, political science etc. I think the chances of a new start are not bad, because the dominant economics has largely run its course ... The time for new fashions cannot be far away.

== Honorary positions ==
- 1970 Honorary Professor of the University of Vienna
- 1974 – 75 visiting professor at Stanford University

== Major works ==
Two of Steindl's most notable works are:

- Small and Big Business; Economic Problems of the Size of Firms (1945)
- Maturity and Stagnation in American Capitalism (1952)

== Sources ==
- Harcourt, Geof (1993) Obituary in The Independent by G. C. Harcourt Saturday, 27 March
- Kregel, J. A. (1993) The International Impact of Josef Steindl's Work. A Personal Assessment Empirica 20: 265–269, 1993. 265
- Mott, Tracy and Nina Shapiro (Editors) (2005) Rethinking Capitalist Development: Essays on the Economics of Josef Steindl, Routledge Frontiers of Political Economy, Routledge ISBN 0-415-15959-8
- Rothschild, Kurt W. (1994) Josef Steindl: 1912–1993, The Economic Journal, Vol. 104, No. 422 (Jan.), pp. 131–137
- Scitovsky, Tibor. The political economy of Josef Steindl, Monthly Review, Vol. 45, No. 1: May 1993.
- Shapiro, N. (1992). Article on Josef Steindl. In A Biographical Dictionary of Dissenting Economists (ed. Philip Arestis and Malcolm Sawyer). Aldershot: Edward Elgar.
