= Krzysztof Pomian =

Polish philosopher, historian and essayist

Krzysztof Andrzej Pomian
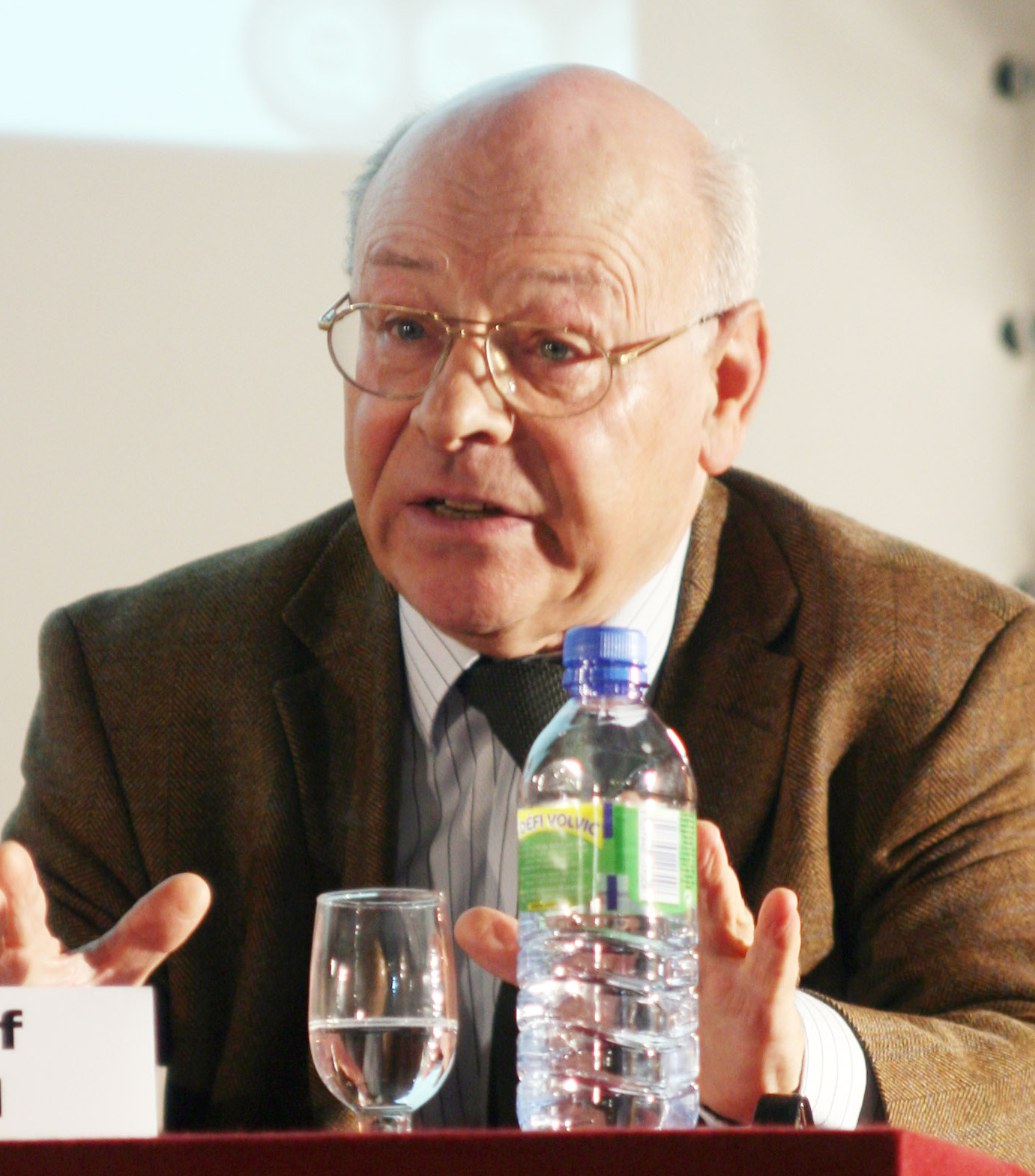
- Pomian speaking at a conference organised by the Foundation for Political Innovation, 2009
- Born: Krzysztof Purman; 1934 (age 91–92); Warsaw, Second Polish Republic
- Known for: Signatory to the Letter of 59
- Board member of: European Network Remembrance and Solidarity
- Spouse: Grażyna Pomian
- Awards: Order of Polonia Restituta

Academic background
- Education: University of Warsaw
- Thesis: (1965)

Academic work
- Discipline: Philosophy
- Institutions: French National Centre for Scientific Research; Nicolaus Copernicus University in Toruń

Krzysztof Pomian (born 1934), is a Polish philosopher, historian and essayist, born in Warsaw. He is a professor of history at the Uniwersytet Mikołaja Kopernika (Nicolaus Copernicus University) in Toruń and, in 2001, was academic director of the (now closed) Museum of Europe in Brussels.

Pomian's specialization lies in the socio-cultural history of France, Italy, and Poland. He teaches as the dean of studies at the École des hautes études en sciences sociales and is an editor of the magazine Le Débat. Since 1968, he has also been a visiting professor at the University of Louvain (UCLouvain) in Louvain-la-Neuve, Belgium, where he lectures on the history of European societies.

== Distinctions and honours ==
- Honorary degree of the Maria Curie-Skłodowska University in Lublin (Poland) since 2003
- Prize of the Foundation for Polish Science (2017)

== Books ==
- Collectionneurs, amateurs et curieux. Paris, Venise : XVIe-XVIIIe siècle. Paris, Gallimard, 1987,
- L'Ordre du temps, 1984
- La querelle du déterminisme : philosophie de la science d'aujourd'hui, 1990
- L'Europe et ses nations, 1990
- Sur l'histoire, 1999
- Des saintes reliques à l'art moderne : Venise-Chicago XIII–XX, 2003
- Ibn Khaldun au prisme de l'Occident, 2006
