= Centre for International Research on Economic Tendency Surveys =

- Abbreviation: CIRET
- Formation: 1960
- Location: Zurich, Switzerland
- Region served: Worldwide
- President: Jan-Egbert Sturm
- Vice-President: Vagner Ardeo
- Website: http://www.ciret.org
- Formerly called: Contact International des Recherches Economiques Tendancielles; Centre for Economic Tendency Surveys

The Centre for International Research on Economic Tendency Surveys (CIRET) is a forum of scientists and institutions who analyse the development of business cycles and their effects on economic and social issues, specifically by means of Economic Tendency Surveys. It was founded in 1960 and is located at the KOF Swiss Economic Institute, ETH Zurich. The current president is Jan-Egbert Sturm.

== Aims ==
According to its statutes CIRET is a non-profit organisation with a scientific purpose. Its aims are:

- "to contribute to the international development, conducting and use of business and other economic surveys of enterprises and consumers" and
- "to develop, encourage and improve communication, exchange, contacts and cooperation among national and international suppliers and users of [such] surveys"

In practice CIRET follows a broader definition of its own scopes, which it describes as being a "forum for leading economists and institutions concerned with analysing and predicting the development of the business cycle and the economic and socio-political consequences. At the same time they also consider the outcome of economic tendency surveys which usually contain questions relating to quality".

== Members ==
As of January 2018, according to CIRET's own accounts 55 national institutions (universities, statistical offices, national banks, public and private research institutes) from 32 countries are represented among the members of CIRET as well as several international organisations like the European Commission, the European Central Bank and the Organisation for Economic Co-operation and Development.

== Conferences and workshops ==
CIRET describes its conferences as the "main event[s] among the association's activities." They are held every other year since 1953. At recent conferences between 65 papers (Hangzhou, 2014) and 115 papers (New York, 2010) have been presented. Among the keynote speakers of recent CIRET Conferences were the former chairman of the Federal Reserve Paul A. Volcker (New York, USA, 2010), David F. Hendry (Vienna, Austria, 2012), Bruno S. Frey (Vienna, Austria, 2012), M. Hashem Pesaran (Hangzhou, China, 2014), and Lucrezia Reichlin (Copenhagen, Denmark, 2016).

Since 2008, the Fundação Getulio Vargas awards the Isaac Kerstenetzky Award at the CIRET conferences in three categories: Lifetime Award (formerly Scholarly Achievement Award), Best Paper Award, and Young Economists' Best Paper Award. The award aims at "promot[ing] research on economic developments possibly using data gained from business and consumer tendency surveys" and has been donated in honour of Isaac Kerstenetzky, a Brazilian economist who started the first Business Tendency Survey in South America.

CIRET Workshops have been established in 2009 and are held in the years without a CIRET Conference. The workshops are smaller compared to the conferences and follow narrower, more specific topics.

== Publications ==
Since 2016 CIRET publishes the Journal of Business Cycle Research in co-operation with Springer Science+Business Media. This journal is the successor of the Journal of Business Cycle Measurement and Analysis which has been published by CIRET jointly with the Organisation for Economic Co-operation and Development from 2004 to 2016.

== History ==
The roots of CIRET go back to 1952 when an informal group of economists of the Ifo Institute for Economic Research (Germany), the Institut National de la Statistique (INSEE, France) and the association of the Italian chambers of commerce intensified their co-operation concerning Business Tendency Surveys under the name CIMCO (Comité International pour l’Etude des Méthodes Conjoncturelles).

In 1960 this informal co-operation was institutionalised by founding the "Contact International des Recherches Economiques Tendancielles" (CIRET). It was affiliated to the Econometrisch Instituut, Rotterdam and had an additional information and documentation centre at the Ifo Institute for Economic Research.

1971 CIRET and its documentation centre were merged and affiliated to the Ifo Institute for Economic Research and renamed "Centre for Economic Tendency Surveys".

In 1999 CIRET has been given a new legal basis under Belgian law and its affiliation and office were relocated to the economic research centre of the KOF Swiss Economic Institute, ETH Zurich. CIRET now stands for "Centre for International Research on Economic Tendency Surveys".
