= Institute for Advanced Studies (Vienna) =

Research institute

Coordinates: 48°11′43″N 16°20′35″E

The Institute for Advanced Studies in Vienna, Austria (German: Institut für Höhere Studien, Wien) is an independent research institute. It was founded in 1963 by Paul F. Lazarsfeld and Oskar Morgenstern, with the help of the Ford Foundation, the Austrian Federal Ministry of Education, and the City of Vienna. It specialises in social sciences. Its official journal, Empirical Economics, is published by Springer Science+Business Media.
