= Jacek Kuroń =

Polish politician (1934–2004)

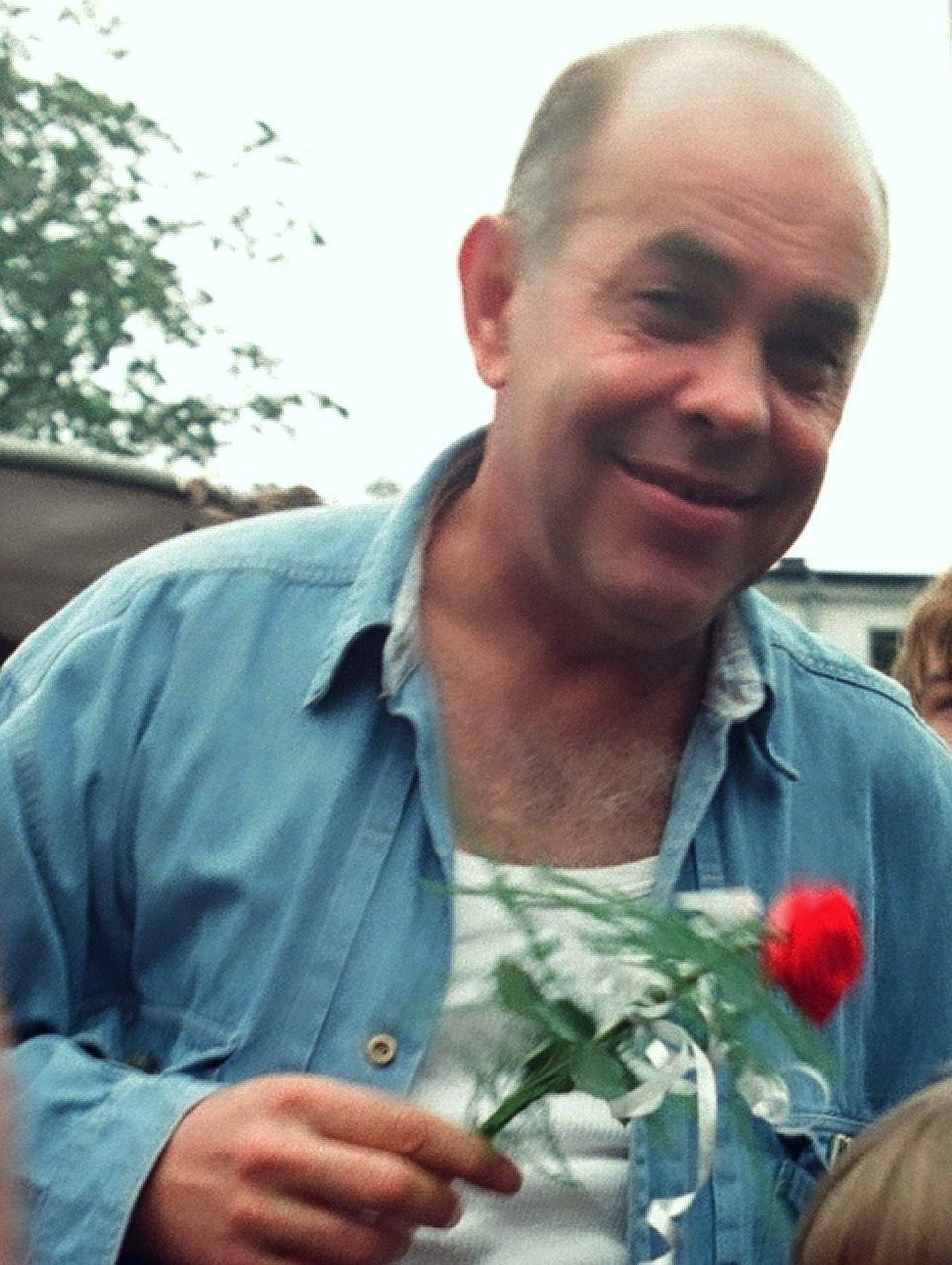
- Kuroń in 1991

Minister of Labour and Social Policy
- In office 11 July 1992 – 26 October 1993
- President: Lech Wałęsa
- Prime Minister: Hanna Suchocka
- Preceded by: Jerzy Kropiwnicki
- Succeeded by: Leszek Miller
- In office 12 September 1989 – 12 December 1990
- President: Wojciech Jaruzelski
- Prime Minister: Tadeusz Mazowiecki
- Preceded by: Michał Czarski
- Succeeded by: Michał Boni

Member of Sejm for Żoliborz
- In office 4 June 1989 – 18 October 2001

Personal details
- Born: Jacek Jan Kuroń; 3 March 1934 Lwów, Poland
- Died: 17 June 2004 (aged 70) Warsaw, Poland
- Party: ZMP (1949-1953); PZPR (1952-1953; 1956-1964); ROAD (1990-1991); Democratic Union (1991-1994); Freedom Union (1994-2001)

Jacek Jan Kuroń (Polish pronunciation: [ˈjat͡sɛk ˈjan ˈkurɔɲ]; 3 March 1934 – 17 June 2004) was a Polish social activist, politician, and one of the most prominent democratic leaders of the opposition in the People's Republic of Poland (PRL). Kuroń played a pivotal role in challenging Communist rule and advocating for democratic reforms during the latter half of the 20th century. After the PRL fell in 1989, Kuroń served as Minister of Labour and Social Policy twice in post-communist Poland, from 1989 to 1990 in the government of Tadeusz Mazowiecki and from 1992 to 1993 in the government of Hanna Suchocka. As an educator and political theorist, he is also known for co-authoring the "Open Letter to the Party".

Initially an idealistic communist in his youth, he first rose to prominence as a revisionist Marxist critic of the PRL and Władysław Gomułka following the events of Polish October. In 1965, together with Karol Modzelewski, he co-wrote the "Open Letter to the Party", which used Marxist theory to argue that a new bureaucratic class had formed under Gomułka which had betrayed the workers, and that the only solution was for a revolution in Poland. His political activities after made him a frequent target of the Security Service (SB), and he spent multiple years in prison from 1965 to 1967 and again from 1969 to 1971. Following the brutal suppression of protests during the December 1970 protests in Poland by Gomułka, Kuroń abandoned Marxism and embraced a philosophy influenced by Christian personalism, although he remained a lifelong atheist. Following these events, he became a key organizer of the Workers' Defence Committee (KOR) in 1976, which provided aid to persecuted workers and laid the groundwork for the subsequent Solidarity movement.

Following the formation of the Solidarity trade union in 1980, he played a major role in supporting it. Although relations between Kuroń and its leader Lech Wałęsa soon started to break down, he still publicly supported the movement and helped to negotiate August Agreements which legalized independent trade unions. After the start of martial law in 1981, he was arrested again and served another prison sentence from 1981 to 1984. After his release, Kuroń participated in the Polish Round Table Agreement as a member of Solidarity's team, which led to Poland's transition to democracy and he was subsequently elected to the Sejm in the first semi-free elections in 1989. After being chosen as Minister of Labour in 1989, he oversaw the implementation of the economic plan of shock therapy while attempting to provide unemployment benefits for the millions that soon lost employment that became known as "kuroniówka." During this time, many of his policies such as his advocacy for rapid privatization and his role in designing a transition that allowed Communist elites from the PRL to exit power without prosecution, were controversial and were decisions he later stated he regretted. In 1995, he ran for president, but was ultimately unsuccessful, placing third, garnering 9.22% of the first-round votes.

Kuroń's political philosophy after his time as minister started to evolve to focus on civic education and minorities. In the Sejm, he represented the Freedom Union starting in 1994 and became Chairman of the Commission for National and Ethnic Minorities, a role in which he adovcated for Roma, Ukrainian, and Jewish communities. As he became increasingly critical of neoliberalism and social inequality, he founded Poland's first food bank after the collapse of the PRL in 1994 called the SOS Foundation and established the Jan Józef Lipski Common University in 2000 to promote civic education, especially in rural areas. He received numerous honours during his lifetime, including the Order of the White Eagle, Poland's highest award, and international awards from France, Germany, Lithuania, the Czech Republic, and Ukraine. Kuroń died on 17 June 2004 after years of declining health since the 1990s. Since his death, he has had numerous streets, squares, and institutions named after him in Poland and in his hometown of Lviv.

== Early life ==
Kuroń was born on 3 March 1934 in Lwów, which was then part of the Second Polish Republic (now Lviv, Ukraine). He was the son of Henryk Kuroń (1905-1982) and Wanda née Rudeńska (1911-1978). His mother, Wanda, graduated with a law degree from Jagiellonian University. On his paternal side, his father, Henryk, was initially a miner from Zagłębie before graduating from Lwów Polytechnic and joining the Union of Independent Socialist Youth (PPS).

Describing his childhood, Kuroń said he grew up in a multi-ethnic environment of Poles, Ukrainians, Jews, and Armenians. He described his first political memory as attending the funeral of Władysław Kozak, a worker killed by the police in Lwów in 1936. During the start of World War II, he described witnessing Polish men throwing stones at Jews, due to what he called a social climate of complicity, which would be a turning point in his life, as he stated he carried a moral responsibility for not acting.

In the spring of 1944, he and his family moved to modern-day Poland to the Podkarpackie Voivodeship. On 12 January 1947, after having previously moved to Kraków after Podkarpackie during the war, his family moved into the residential building on Wilsona Square in Warsaw with an address of 27 Mickiewicza Street, a building he lived at for his whole life. Two years later in 1949, he became a member of the Communist Association of the Polish Youth (ZMP). He described his path into communism as a rebellion against his family's socialist tradition - his father had joined the PPS - a rebellion spurred on after he read Marxist and Leninist texts, which he believed were the "key to unlock the world". He described himself as more of an ideological communist, seeing his ZMP membership as a way to live out the ideals of sovereignty, freedom, and equality. He was soon after briefly the chairman of the School Board of the ZMP in Poniatówka, but was removed from this position soon after at the start of the year 1950 at the request of the school administration, mostly due to his poor academic results and for showing teachers his writings.

In 1952, he graduated from high school and received his diploma. Starting in 1952, he worked as a full-time employee in the capital scout section, which were affiliated with the Association of the Polish Youth. He also joined the Polish United Workers' Party (PZPR). The following year, in March, he became the Chairman of the University Board of the ZMP at the Warsaw University of Technology. However, he did not last in this position for long as in November 1953, he was expelled from the ZMP apparatus and from the PZPR. The reason for this was him criticizing the ideological concept of the ZMP, which he refused to retract, and so he was removed from the list of members of the ZMP.

== Early social and political activities ==
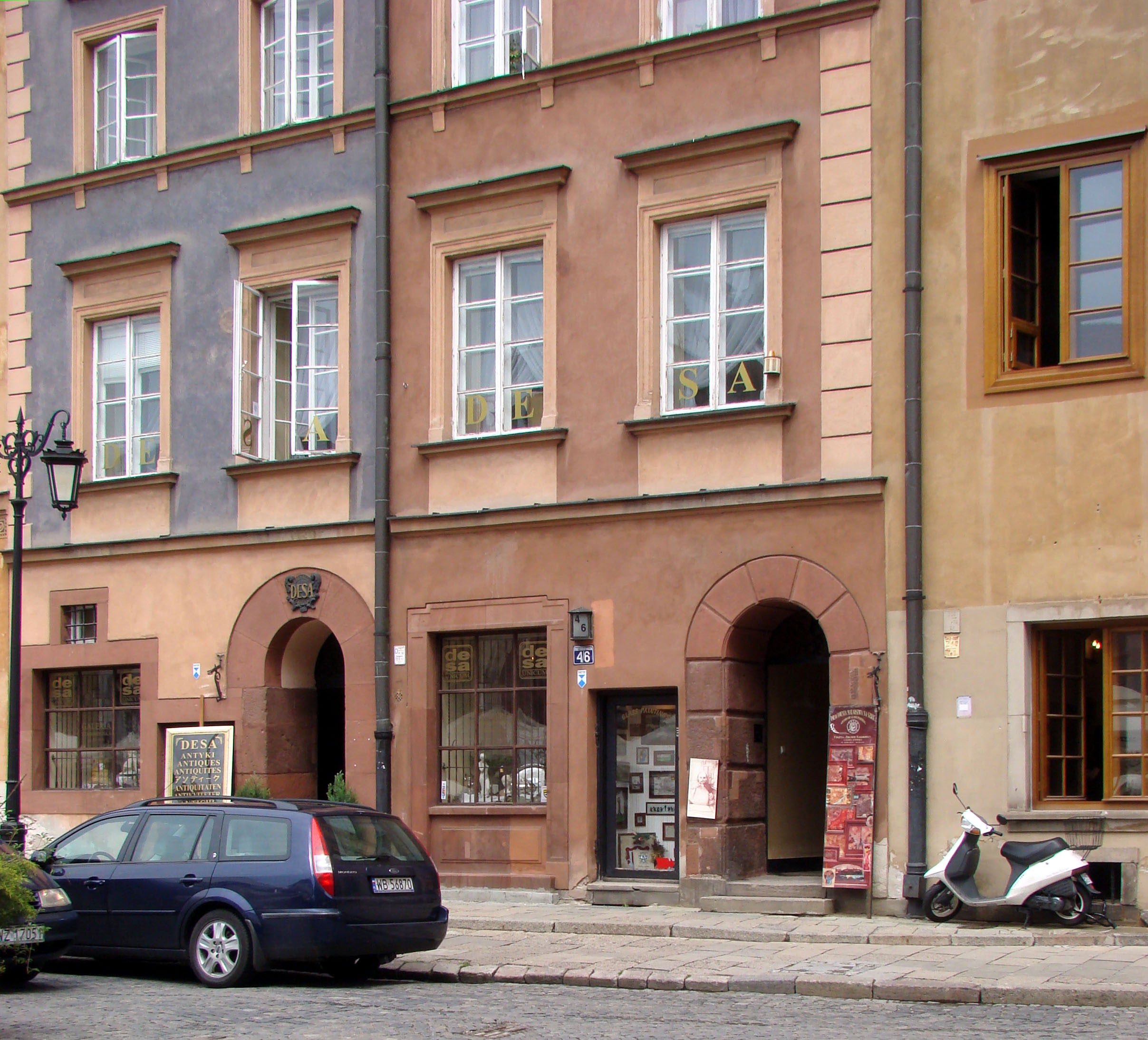
Kuroń participated in the Crooked Circle Club, which was headquartered in this building.

In the autumn of 1953, he began his studies at the State Higher School of Pedagogy, majoring in Russian studies in Warsaw, and upon the dissolution of the school in 1955, he started attending the University of Warsaw, studying history. In 1955 the Crooked Circle Club was also established, which was a discussion club for the young intelligentsia. The press organ of the club was "Nowy Nurt". Prior to this, Kuroń had been part of a young circle of Marxists who met at the university library of the State Higher School of Pedagogy starting in 1953 who concluded that collectivization and the war against the peasants had "destroyed the revolution" by handing power to bureaucracy. Jacek Kuroń and Karol Modzelewski were among the most prominent members of the club. During this time, he also became part of the intellectual milieu that published the weekly newspaper of Po Prostu, which was a forum for the "October left". In June 1956 he was readmitted into the PZPR after he became active in politics at the university, organizing rallies in what he later called the "young guard of the proletarian masses", and tried to unite the students and workers through the ZMS. During the summer of 1955, Kuroń led the scouts in a summer camp in Wolin. While taking a trip to the Union of Lublin Square, some of the participants of the camp, under the permission of Kuroń, bathed in the Vistula river. However, three of the participants got carried away by the currents of the Vistula and were killed. He was then arrested on 30 August and charged with the manslaughter of the three children, and ordered to stand trial. In April 1956, however, the proceedings were discontinued under amnesty, although the mother of one of the children filed a separate civil lawsuit for compensation against him. Following this, he was banned from working directly with young people as a scout leader, although until 1964 he was permitted to remain involved in the scouting movement in other capacities.

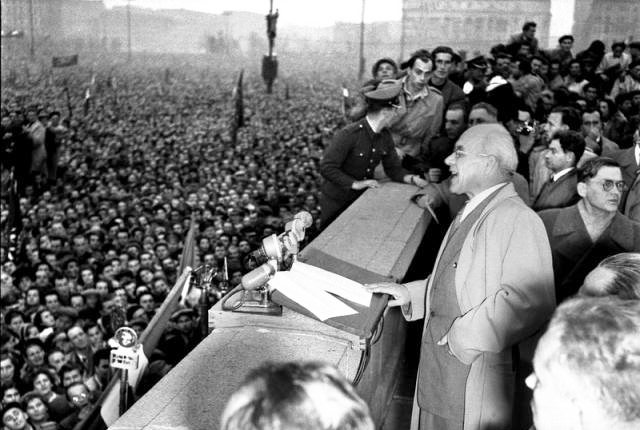
Protests during Polish October, which was led by Władysław Gomułka. Kuroń became active after the events as part of the "October left".

During Polish October, he attended the mass protests, particularly the one on 24 October 1956 in Warsaw, where over 200,000 people greeted Władysław Gomułka. After this, he started writing and distributing texts against the PZPR's Natolinians, who were against liberalization, alongside writing against the PAX Association which he associated with fascism. He distributed these in factories and schools. During this time, he aligned himself with the "October left", who opposed Stalinism while also supporting Marxist ideals, marking his shift to a more radical and critical left position. He considered the "October left" to be the more authentic heirs of the Polish October, and the only ones committed to a true revolution and workers' empowerment. In December 1956, after the events of Polish October, the Łódź congress was held, which reestablished the Polish Scouting and Guiding Association (now renamed to ZHP from ZMP). During the congress, he was an active participant, specifically on whether scouting should be political or religious, and how the organization should be rebuilt. He championed socialism as the spirit of the new organization, arguing that socialist ideology was essential for scouting. However, he soon grew disillusioned with the liberalization after the Polish October led by Gomułka, after seeing that the reforms were limited and deepened his revisionist stance. He saw Yugoslavia's system of worker self-governance and linked democracy to active participation in economic management as something that should be replicated in Poland. As he would later argue in the open letter, the "October left" had failed to create its own political program and supported the liberal wing of bureaucracy - that is, Gomułka's faction - which led to stabilization and crushed any revolution. He saw the Workers' Councils in Poland as a foundation of a new socialist democracy, but he accused the October left of not separating itself from technocrats or liberal bureaucrats, and thus losing its chance to lead the nation.

The following year, he co-founded the scouting association called the Walterowcy (named after Karol Świerczewski, who went by the callsign "Walter"). It was founded after he had graduated from the University of Warsaw in the Faculty of History. The educational concept of an athetistic socialist upbringing, as opposed to the traditional Catholic scouting tradition, was formulated by Kuroń which became the guiding ethos of the Walterowcy. He was mostly inspired by Anton Makarenko's The Pedagogical Poem and the ideas expressed there, as he wanted to build socialist consciousness through education. However, the troops only remained active for a short time: by 1961, the scouts had been disbanded after many members of the scouting group, including Kuroń, had criticized social and political conditions in Poland under Gomułka’s regime after they had rolled back some of the openness that had been present after the Polish October.

Following this, in 1962, together with Karol Modzelewski he decided to set up a discussion club in a similar vein to the Crooked Circle Club called the "Political Discussion Club". The club itself was within the organizational framework of the ZMS and set up at the University of Warsaw. As stated by Modzelewski, the goals of the club were to counter the existing political organizations and to promote a socialist ideology and its values to the youth. In most meetings, they read from Communist works and critiques of Stalinism, although the club was not a formal organization and its events were open to university students. However, the club, just like the scouting troops, did not last long, as the university's authorities became uneasy with the club's activities and disbanded it after an academic year. Regardless of being disbanded, many members of the club, led by Modzelewski and Kuroń, still met in secret. At the same time, however, Modzelewski and Kuroń's views still differed from most of the rest of the group as they were more ideologically Marxist radicalists, and so together they wrote an ideological program starting in September 1964 which was planned to be distributed illegally with the help of Trotskyite activists but was stopped by the security apparatus. In it, they planned to state the central bureaucracy would apply terror in any form necessary to maintain power, and had allied itself with the technocracy and the right, so the only solution therefore was a working class revolution that needed to abolish the "dictatorship of the central bureacracy".

In November 1964, he was detained by Security Service forces at Stanisław Gomułka's apartment, who was a member of the "Political Discussion Club". The apartment was raided after a Security Service officer intercepted a telephone invitation to a nameday party, with the word "bigos" being misinterpreted as a revolutionary code word. Upon being detained, the first version of the platform that Modzelewski and Kuroń had written was confiscated, and subsequently, they were expelled from the ZMS and the PZPR. Kuroń was specifically expelled due to the platform's writings on the manner of exercising power power by the First Secretary, Gomułka, which he had regarded as revionism. However, no trial was held, and Kuroń was released soon after. This was due to them only having one copy of the text, and under the "Small Penal Code", they couldn't be charged with distribution without multiple copies or a printing device, neither of which they had.

== Open Letter to the Party and first imprisonment ==
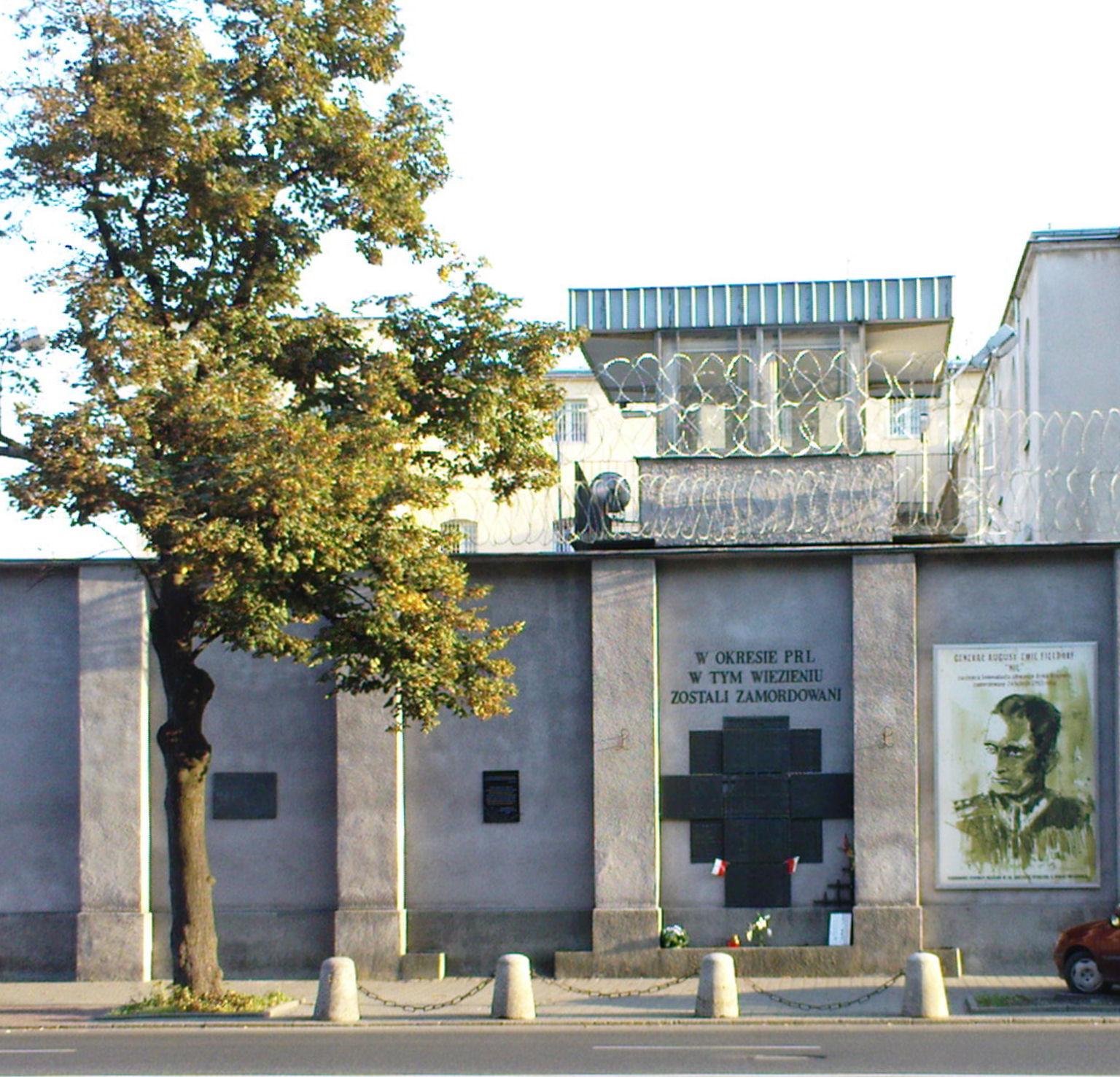
Kuroń was briefly held in Mokotów Prison alongside Jan Rulewski following the release of the Open Letter to the Party.

Following his release, Kuroń and Modzelewski continued finalizing the platform, which became known as the Open Letter to the Party. The letter itself was written in a neo-Marxist critique, which is described as "Promethean", aiming to turn Marxist theory against the party that claimed to represent it. It extensively utilizes Marx's "Economic and Philosophic Manuscripts of 1844", embodying Marx's 11th thesis. It mostly follows the ideas of Yugoslavian leader Milovan Đilas, arguing that a "central political bureaucracy" had emerged as a new exploitative class, with this elite monopolizing all decision-making, blocking any ideological competition and preventing the organization of any alternative programs. Because the bureaucracy had controlled all venues, Kuroń states that elections were fictitious, and diagnosed a "maladjustment of production" to the real needs of consumers. He constantly criticized the "ineffective bureaucratic machine" for wasting the surplus value created by workers, holding back technological and social developments. It is also argued that workers were systematically exploited, with wages only covering the bare minimum, and the working class were excluded from decisions. In short, he called the regime "nationalistic rhetoric" rather than genuine ideology, and that the suppression of critical thinking would lead to total cultural collapse. Thus, they argue that the system could not be reformed and that only a revolution would save Poland, proposing instead an institutionalized self-rule of workers through councils that would be autonomous governing bodies within factories, and also proposing a parliament of delegates from these councils.

On 18 March 1965, sixteen printed copies of the manifesto were distributed at the party offices, in the offices of the International Union of Socialist Youth, and at the University of Warsaw. As Kuroń stated, the aim of the letter was to connect with anyone who could "think independently" and "conscious". Both Modzelewski and Kuroń were arrested on 19 March 1965, and they were promptly charged with "intent to distribute" illegal literature after a mimeograph machine was found in their housing (which Kuroń alleged was planted by a "provocateur"). In July 1965, both were formally charged: Kuroń was given 3 years in prison. During the proceedings, the crowd sang "The Internationale", which the police were unable to stop due to it being the official hymn of the communist movement.

Initially, he was held in Mokotów Prison, where he was joined in cell 76 of the XII pavilion by Jan Rulewski. He described the prison as "isolating". Rulewski later described a bond with Kuroń in the prison, as Kuroń lectured on pre-war Poland, Ukrainian-Polish relations, and internal communist party factions. By February 1966, however, he was housed in the old high-security prison in Sztum, which was intended for repeat offenders. According to Kuroń, he was denied access of books and forbidden from continuing his doctoral research, and was forced to work in extreme heat and was placed in a cell with a violent criminal as punishment. After protests in the West due to his condition, Kuroń was moved to renovated Central Labour Camp in Potulice. According to Kuroń, the prison in Potulice was considered "very mild" compared to Sztum, but he thought it was worse because of fatal working conditions and overcrowding.

During his imprisonment, in 1966, the letter was smuggled to the West and published by the émigré political magazine Kultura in Paris. The letter then became a symbol of rebellion against communist power and as a document of Polish political thought. Opinions at the time varied on it: the Archbishop of Warsaw, Stefan Wyszyński, viewed the letter as a youth rebellion but also a moral phenomenon that could open a "second front" to relieve pressure on the Church, Professor Krzysztof Pomian initially disliked the letter for its "immature" tone, Jerzy Giedroyc stated he thought it carried historical weight for the left-wing opposition, and Priest Józef Tischner stated he had respect for nonconformoity. He was released early from prison in May 1967.

== Protests and second imprisonment ==
After being released, he was constantly followed by Secret Service agents, but regardless, his apartment became a hub for rebellious students known as the "Komandosi" (The Commandos), with Kuroń becoming their intellectual mentor. However, a breaking point came in early 1968 with the banning of Adam Mickiewicz's play, Dziady, because the authorities deemed it "anti-Russian". After the final performance of the play, students marched to a monument dedicated to Mickiewicz, and although Kuroń did not directly organize the march, he was seen as a "spiritual father" of the movement. By this point, pro-regime activists, specifically a man named Rysiek Łukasiewicz, started attacking Kuroń as a "conspiracy of former Stalinists supported by international Jewish organizations", and Kuroń was seen as an enemy of the state. He was seen by people as a "madman", with journalist Wojciech Giełżyński explaining that while people thought that the actions of the movement might be noble, they feared the "madmen" would only "irritate the Bolsheviks" and prevent any real change from happening. On 8 March 1968, as student protests erupted at the University of Warsaw, the police arrested Kuroń before he could join the students at the university gates.

As Reuters reported, the trial for Kuroń began in January 1969, and three days into the trial the Polish Press Agency (PAP) allowed for the first time outside agencies to report on it. As PAP stated, they were accused of being "members of a group whose goal was to provoke the public into anti-state administrations", and also accused them of maintaining contact with "Western Trotskyist organizations".. The trial largely followed many Soviet intellectual trials, with the audience consisting of personnel from the Interior Ministry's security apparatus. As the trial went on, the PAP stated Kuroń received propaganda materials and technical equipment from an organization called the "Fourth International", with the technical equipment being shown as a mimeograph machine brought from Belgium and smuggled in by placing Red Cross symbols on the housing crate. They also stated that the information that Kuroń provided to the "Fourth International" organization was information on the political, social, and economic situation in Poland. Foreign correspondents were eventually refused entry to the trial, and while friends and families were technically admitted, they were monitored by the police. Kuroń was eventually sentenced to 3 and a half years in jail, and were characterized by the court as the "spiritual leaders" of the riots. While they were originally charged with instigating unrest with "aid from abroad", they were ultimately found guilty only under Article 36 of the Polish penal code. This means that the court did not find them guilty of "collaboration with a foreign organization". The prosecution had originally asked for harsher sentences, with seven years for Kuroń. The trial caused a sensation in Western Europe, with Fourth International leader Pierre Frank commenting on it by praising the "Open letter" as the first revolutionary Marxist document from a workers' state since Trotsky's death. Later, after an appeal, on 21 May 1969 the Supreme Court of Poland upheld his sentence.

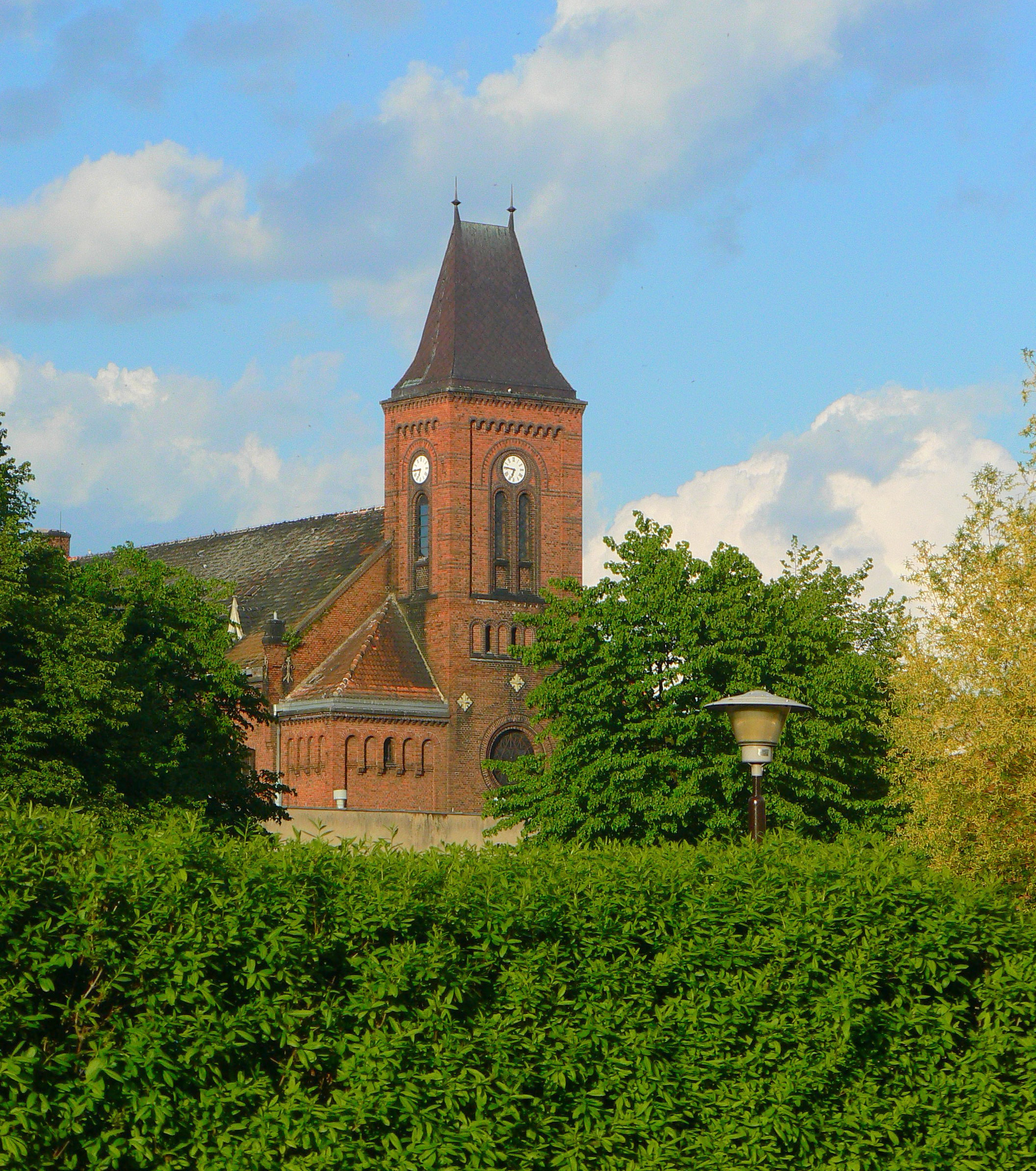
Wronki Prison, where Kuroń was held between 1969 and 1971.

After his sentencing, he was placed in Wronki Prison. Following these events, the ZHP officially distanced itself from Kuroń, with the state calling him a "Zionist asset" and during an anti-Semitic speech, official Mieczysław Moczar called Kuroń a puppet of "international Trotskyism". Thus, Kuroń found himself completely isolated, with almost nobody defending him. In Wronki, Kuroń was placed in pavilion F, which was a wing for "professional criminals" and the intellectually disabled, which he called a deliberate attempt by the state to break him by not surrounding him by people who understood his political beliefs. During this time, he described "extreme cruelty" in the prison as inmates would self-mutilate themselves, and there was a "cult of the SS". Prison management recommended against his early release because his "views had not changed", but despite opposition, he was released on 17 September 1971.

== 1970s, KOR, and shift from Marxism ==
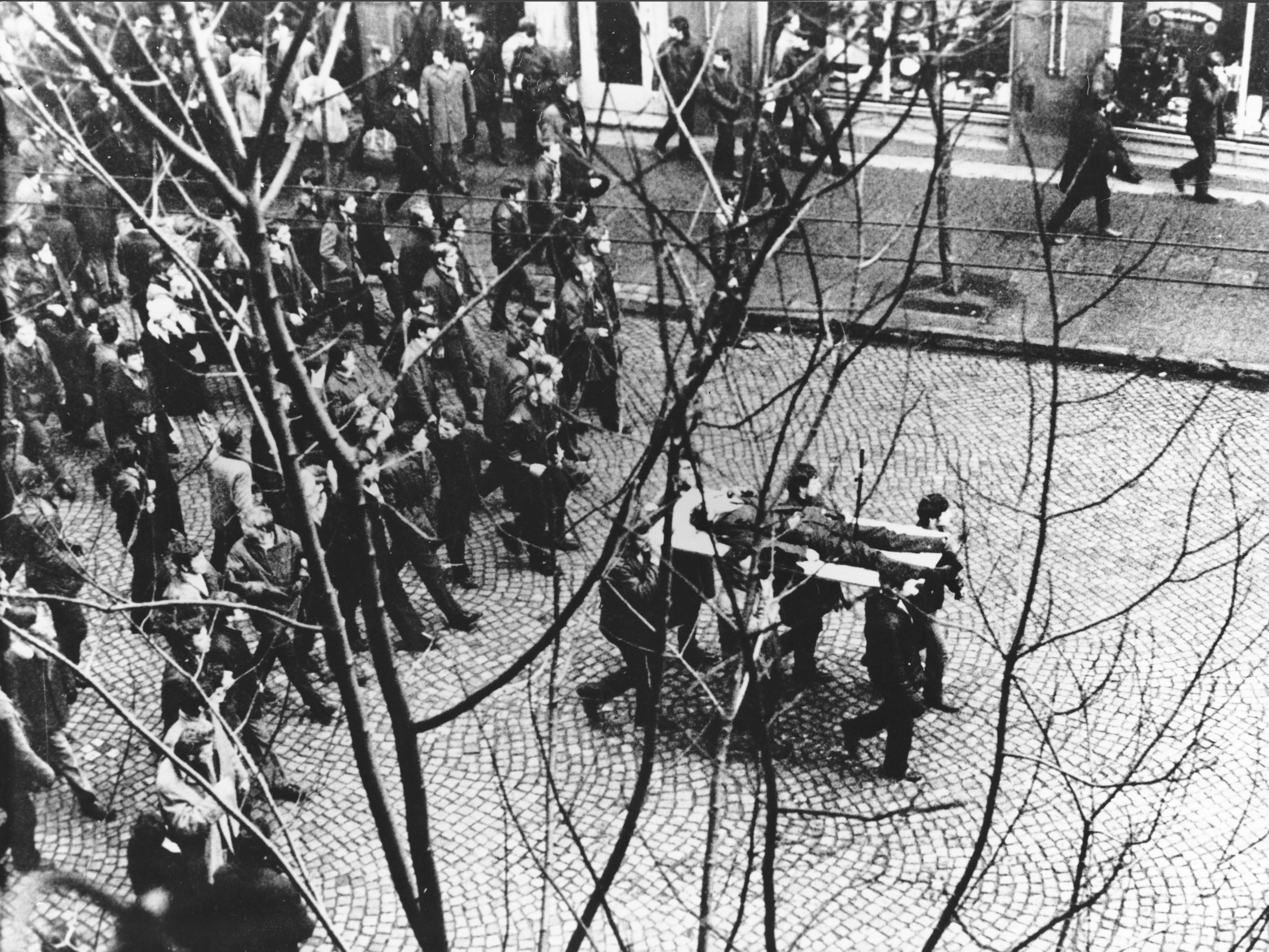
A dead protestor (Zbyszek Godlewski) is carried during the December 1970 protests in Poland. These events sparked Kuroń's shift from Marxism.

In December 1970, protests sparked by an increase in prices on everyday items were brutally suppressed by the Polish People's Army under Gomułka, leading to the death of 44 protestors. This marked a turning point in Kuroń's ideology: he realized that the Marxist framework failed to explain the human condition or provide a moral compass, feeling that consistent rationalism led to a dead end. This led to him developing his own philosophy on the political world, influenced by German Lutheran pastor Dietrich Bonhoeffer, where he argued for living "as if God existed", even if he himself could not find personal faith, believing that without a sense of the sacred humans risk becoming "animals". During this time, despite his ardent secularism, he started cooperating with Catholic intellectuals like Tadeusz Mazowiecki and clergy like Karol Wojtyła (the future Pope John Paul II). He also read Leszek Kołakowski's writings, which moved him from revolutionary radicalism towards reformism, and he advocated against secret underground plots but rather open, named protests and that protestors should sign with their names to give courage to the rest of society to participate.

At first, he struggled finding employment as he was barred by the authorities from normal employment, so he relied on loans from friends and writing detective novels under various pseudonyms. However, the novels were never published due to government officials, so he did not make much money off them. Igor Newerly also hired him on paper as his private secretary. He became politically active once again in 1975 when he edited the Letter of 59, which was an open letter protesting against the changes of the Constitution of the Polish People's Republic that were proposed by authorities. He worked to strip the letter of its "historical introduction" and made it into political postulates, introduced the demand for democratic elections, and opposed "Sovietization". He also primarily argued for signing names to the letter so that the opposition was not a hidden conspiracy, and helped gather signatures form intellectuals like Antoni Słonimski and Edward Lipiński. Afterwards, on 19 December 1975, Kuroń personally delivered the translated text to Western media like Reuters and AFP, and gave it to Radio Free Europe to broadcast back into Poland, which was a largely successful effort.

Following the initial June 1976 in Polish protests, in Laski he was a signatory against the government's initial repression of workers and worked to gather information about the crackdowns in Radom but in July he was sent to Białystok on forced military training. Despite this, he communicated with Italian Communist Party leader Enrico Berlinguer to urge him to protest the government repression in Radom and Ursus following the strikes, intending to force the Polish authorities to exercise restraint with the use of internationalization. Berlinguer ended up reacting immediately, an action which internationalized the matter across Europe. While on leave from the military in September, he met with other anti-communists to form the Workers' Defence Committee (KOR), a worker's defense committee and civil organization that helped pave the way for Solidarność (Polish: Solidarity). Together with other KOR members, he attended the Radom trials for protestors who were convicted in the 1976 protests, and helped pay the fines levied against the workers. He also helped organize a petition to the Sejm demanding a commission to investigate police abuses during the crackdown, with his apartment on Mickiewicza Street becoming the hub for KOR leading to constant raids.

Following the death of Stanisław Pyjas in May 1977, a student activist for KOR in Kraków, who KOR accused of being beaten by members of the SB, many KOR members were arrested. He was again briefly arrested during this time, but was soon released. In July 1978, his mother, Wanda, passed away, which caused immense grief for Jacek, and the surveillance of Jacek intensified with the SB creating a dedicated unit to monitor Kuroń. This was because, in addition to KOR, the operational basis for the Flying University, an underground educational enterprise, was based in his house. In the first few months of 1979, the Federation of Socialist Youth Unions of Poland (FSZMP), which operated under the PZPR, started forming patriotic militias. This culminated in March 1979, when members of Jacek's family, including his son and father, along with Adam Michnik, who lived with Jacek, were severely beaten. Eventually, Kuroń suspended his lectures at the Society for Scientific Courses out of fear against the SB, an action some intellectuals like Edward Lipiński criticized as "retreating before violence". During this time, however, he still snuck out of his house to meet with Czech dissidents from Charter 77 (including Václav Havel and Marta Kubišová), eventually leading to Havel creating the essay The Power of the Powerless about how to "overthrow the common tyrant".

== Early 1980s and formation of Solidarity ==
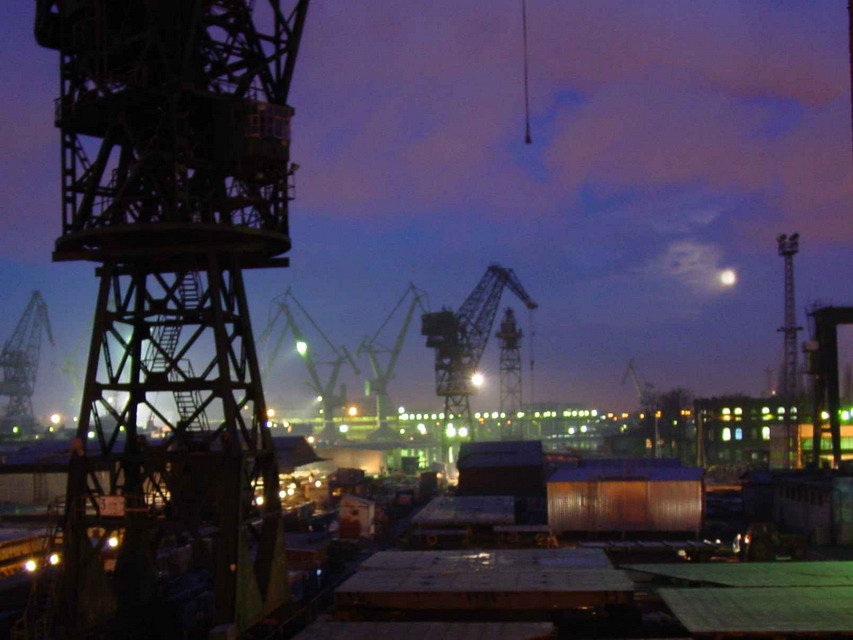
The Gdańsk Shipyard, where strikes were held following Anna Walentynowicz's firing. These events eventually led Kuroń to helping found Solidarity.

In early August 1980, workers at the Gdańsk Shipyard went on strike after Anna Walentynowicz was fired for participating in the Free Trade Unions of the Coast (WZZ; an early precursor to Solidarity). Initially, Kuroń was cautious about the strikes at the shipyard, fearing it might provoke a Soviet invasion of Poland, and advocated for "Worker Committees" to control existing unions. However, he changed his mind when Alina Pienkowska, a worker at the shipyard, called, reporting that the shipyard workers were demanding the release of political prisoners, which made Kuroń realize that the protests were not economic but political. Soon after the Inter-Enterprise Strike Committee (MKS) was created to represent the independent trade unions and they listed their demands over the strike in the 21 demands of the Inter-Enterprise Strike Committee. In response to this, the First Secretary and leader of the PZPR, Edward Gierek, attacked KOR, labeling them as "anti-socialist", accusing "Kuroń elements" of radicalizing the workers to strike.

To bypass legal limits, the police used "48-hour" detentions, or re-arresting immediately after release, to detain Kuroń and other KOR members. However, soon after a split within the government merged where some advocated against forcing the strike to break. Eventually, the Politburo agreed to the workers' demands, agreeing to the right to free independent trade unions, meaning Solidarity was officially formed. Lech Wałęsa also managed to negotiate the release of Kuroń as a condition for ending the strike. However, despite this, some fights broke out among the members of the MKS, with Kuroń attacking Waldemar Kuczyński, whom he accused of a lack of loyalty due to his willingness to compromise on the prisoner issue. Indeed, during this time, Wałęsa, influenced by the Church, specifically Archbishop Stefan Wyszyński, who opposed Kuroń and preferred a more "purely unionist path, alongside his own desire to remain the sole face of the movement, pushed Kuroń to the sidelines in decision-making for the young Solidarity.

Despite this, Kuroń never tried to overthrow Wałęsa, believing that the cultivated image of Wałęsa being infallible and a charismatic symbol of the Polish working class was essential for the movement's unity and if Wałęsa himself fell, the union would collapse into factions. Thus, Kuroń tried to moderate the more radical wings of Solidarity to keep Wałęsa as a center candidate and the image. Due to this, the regime used state media to attack Kuroń specifically, hoping to portray him as the "radical advisor" due to him working with the radical wings in order to drive a wedge between the workers and the intellectuals. Solidarity was officially registered with the courts on 10 November 1980.

During the Soviet reaction to the Polish crisis of 1980–1981, which was due to the formation of Solidatiry and the Soviets fearing it would trigger a collapse in the Polish communist government, the Church started to again distance itself as while they believed in a "healthy" Solidarity, they viewed Kuroń and Michnik as "radicals" pushing the country towards catostrophe and so the leadership like Bishop Alojzy Orszulik, specifically criticized Kuroń. In response, Kuroń wrote the article "Are We Threatened by Intervention?", in which Kuroń postulated that the Soviets would only invade if they felt Poland was completely escaping their sphere of influence and he believed that the costs to Moscow (namely Western economic blockades and war), were too high. He also publicly criticized the Church, which he felt betrayed by. However, the Soviet leadership (namely Chairman of the KGB Yuri Andropov and General Secretary of the USSR Leonid Brezhnev), was still furious with the Polish government that Kuroń and Michnik were allowed to "manipulate" Solidarity, and pressured then First Secretary of Poland Stanisław Kania to arrest both.

Eventually, the first National Congress of Delegates of Solidarity happened in September 1981. Two main sides former: the centrsit Christian-worker current led by Wałęsa and the left-wing, secular current associated with Kuroń and Michnik. Kuroń during the congress was a strong supporter of a broad front of national agreement, in which the communists would share power in the government with Solidarity and the Church. He was also an advocate of a peaceful strategy during martial law, believing that Solidarity should restrain its impulses and otherwise would risk civil war. Due to this, the nationalist faction called the "True Poles" attacked Kuroń, comparing him to the "corpse of Lenin". When martial law did actually start on the night of 12 December 1981, during a secret operation called "Mewa" (Seagull), SB forces arrested Kuroń and was taken to the ZOMO headquarters (a paramilitary force of the government). He was then transferred to an internment camp.

Soon after, Stanisław Barańczak, a lecturer at Harvard University and a KOR activist, claimed he had heard from witnesses that Kuroń was "cruelly beaten and tortured" while in police custody. He also claimed that he was singled out "as a way of vengeance". Author Czesław Miłosz also affirmed this account Jerzy Urban, speaking on behalf of the government at Polish Radio and Television, responded to the claims of Western reports by denying them. He said that Kuroń had been interned, but said that he had been authorized to state that "not a hair of their heads has been harmed." Initially he was held in Strzebielinek near the site of his arrest in Gdańsk, but was later transferred to Białołęka near Warsaw. Like his arrest in 1965, he was held with Jan Rulewski. While in prison, he wrote "Theses on a Way Out of a No-Exit Situation", which argued that a national, organized uprising was inevitable and called for an attack on centers of power and information. He stated that martial law had forced him to abandon his non-violent philosophy. Many members of Solidarity called the text "insane" and "dangerous", including Michnik and Zbigniew Bujak, fearing his statements would cause a bloodbath. Years later, Kuroń admitted the text was a mistake and stated it was written during a psychosis. In September 1982 he was moved from "internment" (meaning detention without trial) to a regular prison, and was formally charged under Article 123 of the Penal Code which was attempting to overthrow the state by force and carried a minimum of five years in prison to the death penalty.

During his time in prison, he was allowed to briefly go free twice: initially in September 1982 for the death of his father Henryk, and again for a longer time in November 1982 when his wife Grażyna died. After martial law ended in July 1983, partial amnesty was given to many KOR members except Kuroń and a few others prominent Solidarity leaders. In August, Kuroń was given an offer by the government of a passport to leave Poland with his family and stay away from politics, but he declined. He was offered it again in October 1983, with the terms changing with this time the government offering it only if Western governments would give him and the other members asylum, which was backed by the United Nations. In June, ahead of the trial against him formally starting, Kuroń begun a hunger strike aimed at forcing the government to bring him to trial then or release him. The strike was seen as the action that forced the government to begin the trial early. On 14 July 1984, the trial formally began.

It was held in a Warsaw district military court, and if found guilty would be sentenced from 1 to 10 years in prison. In court, the Polish government accused Kuroń and the other 3 members of KOR of turning worker's protests against economic management into a political movement which was intended to overthrow the state structures and unseat Communist rule. As evidence, the government detailed a network of illegal organizations they accused of being set up by KOR, propaganda campaigns, and financial support from Western sources they accused of being hostile to Poland. Kuroń's lawyer, Jerzy Wozniak, stated that KOR in turn had always operated in the open and that they had rejected violence. During the time of the trial, it became an international sensation after the United States warned that the imprisonment of Kuroń and the other KOR members would harm prospects for the lifting of economic sanctions it had levied against Poland, and the Polish Church also made it clear that it was opposed to the trial. On 19 July the trial was adjourned, citing a pending decision in the Polish Parliament on an amnesty proposed by the Coalition for National Unity. On 22 July, all four were granted amnesty by First Secretary Wojciech Jaruzelski ahead of the 40th anniversary of Polish independence. In August he was formally freed, but soon after attacked the amnesty he was given because he could not appeal the terms of it and prove his innocence in his view, which he accused the government of doing to avoid bad publicity.

During May Day demonstrations organizied by Solidarity in 1985, ZOMO dispered participants, and Kuroń was once again arrested alongside Seweryn Jaworski. He was afterwards immediately jailed for three months in Warsaw. He was released a few weeks later on 27 May after a Warsaw district court found him not guilty of refusing police orders, ruling there was "no justification". Kuroń described his release as a pivotal shift: he noted that prior the government was "insenstive" to peaceful pressure, and thus with his release there were signs of potential normalization in order to gain acceptance from the West.

== Late 1980s, Round Table Talks, and elections ==
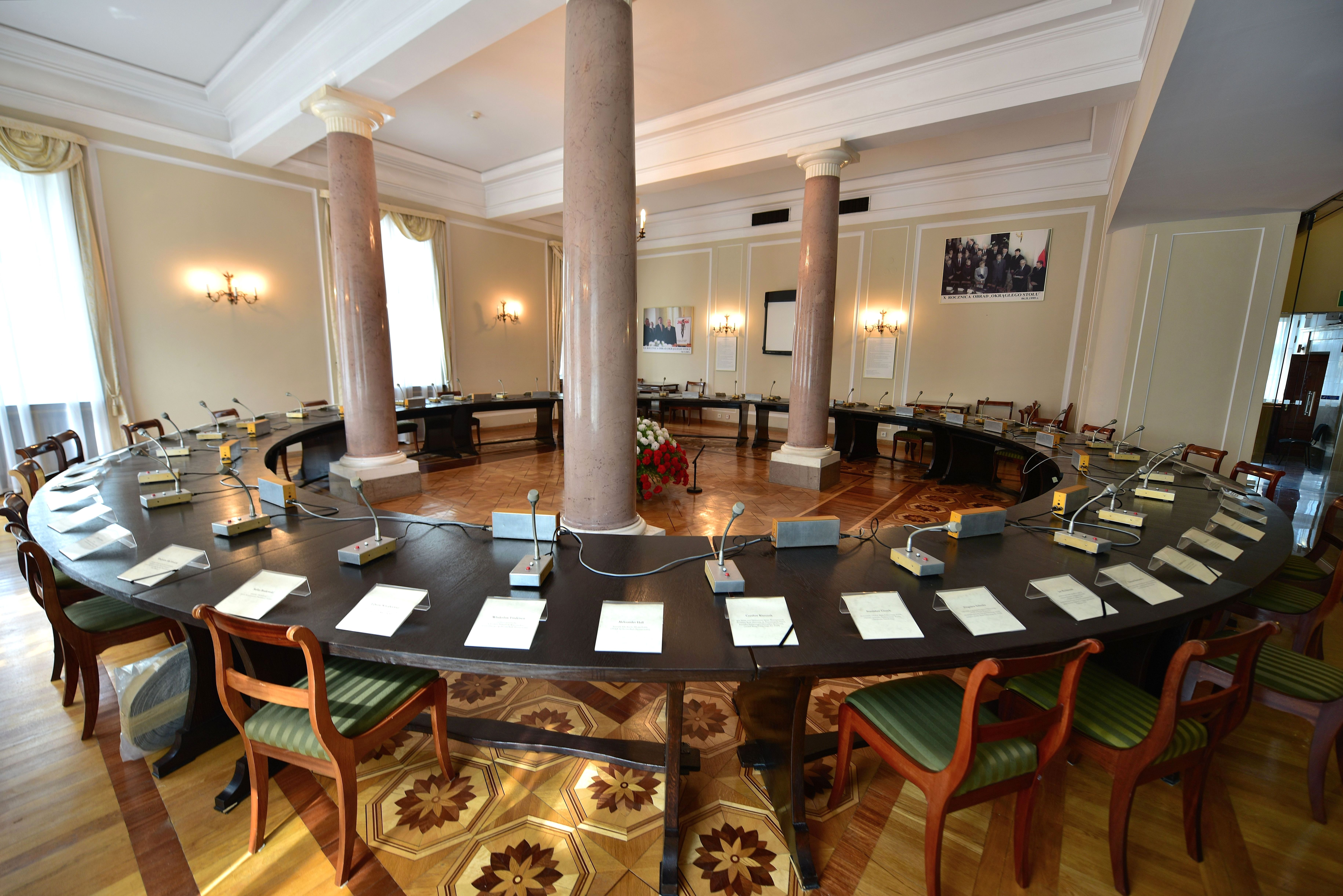
The original building where the Polish Round Table Talks were held.

Due to Kuroń once again being barred from normal work, his friend Joasia Szczęsna managed his debts and provided him with a secret salary from funds smuggled from the West. By 1988, serious discussion about round-table talks between the government and opposition started. However, it stalled after Wałęsa told Interior Minister Czesław Kiszczak that he would object to the talks over issues regarding the composition of Solidarity's delegation. This was because the government had objected to including Kuroń and Michnik as part of Solidarity's delegation, with Urban stating the government would not budge unless both publicly declared they would respect the government and constitutional order. Wałęsa responded by saying it would set a "dangerous precedent" for the future if both were removed. In November, Wałęsa agreed to meet the government to compromise on the issue. During the 10th plenery session of the PZPR, the government finally relented after a meeting between Kiszczak and Wałęsa on the night of 27 January 1989, agreeing that Michnik and Kuroń could be included in the talks.

Ahead of the talks, Kuroń was the person who drew up the list of members of the Solidarity Citizens' Committee who would participate in the talks, which was a move derided by critics who used it as evidence of the "oligarchization" of Solidarity as Kuroń used this control to maintain a moderate policy line and prevent radicalism. When the talks actually happened, Kuroń described the talks as a "covenant between elites" intended to secure financial and political benefits, but still participated in more secret talks at the government villa in Magdalenka. He helped design, alongside the Solidarity leadership, a transition that would allow the communist elites to exit power without facing any prosecution or total financial ruin. He later expressed regret over this in a 1997 interview, stating that this allowed the people who suppressed Solidarity to become the pioneers of the market economy. During the discussions, Kuroń also specifically spoke about the problems facing minority groups in Poland, specifically regarding Ukrainians. During the talks, he was also part of a specific working group dedicated to "political reform", and was part of the group that got to the agreement of semi-free elections which he called a historic step towards democracy, believing it allowed the necessary conditions for citizens to elect "real representatives". At the end of the talks, Kuroń met with U.S. President George H. W. Bush in the White House, during which they talked about human rights. They met when he was awarded the Democracy Award from the National Endowment for Democracy.

He eventually announced he was running to be a Member of Parliament (MP) in the first Sejm for the territory of Żoliborz. At the time, the New York Times called it the most watched race in the country in the 1989 elections as his opponent was Wladyslaw Sila-Nowicki, who was a distinguished lawyer that also had defended Kuroń during his trials in the 1970s that had strong backing from some of the Polish Roman Catholic bishops. During a televised debate, Kuroń argued for "total unity", believing that the opposition should set its difference aside to ensure it won is allotted seats. On 4 June 1989, results were officially announced, with Kuroń winning the district with 67% of the vote, although Siła-Nowicki still garnered 20% of the vote.

During the summer after the elections, Kuroń supported Michnik's "Your President, Our Prime Minister" proposal, which he advocated to the Parliamentary Club for. The proposal stated that the opposition would support Communist leader Wojciech Jaruzelski as President, while the Communists would allow an opposition Prime Minister. He acted as a negotiater between the opposition and PZPR, and learned directly from Jaruzelski that he was willing to let Solidarity lead the government and bypass hardline Communist leader Mieczysław Rakowski. Due to this, he was heavily criticized by brother politicians Jarosław Kaczyński and Lech Kaczyński, who considered it morally compromising to make deals with the Communist party in secret. Eventually, Wałęsa was given the option to choose a Prime Minister by Jaruzelski as the leader of Solidarity, and Wałęsa initially chose Kuroń was one of his three finalists for being Prime Minister. The Prime Minister position eventually went to Tadeusz Mazowiecki.

== Minister of Labour ==
=== First term (1989-90) ===
Initially, during July, Kuroń met Jeffrey Sachs, a liberal economist that was a proponent of shock therapy, who lectured him on price liberalization and debt moratoriums. After Sachs proposed a radical shock program for the economy, Kuroń immediately told him to create a plan, setting the ideological tone for the plans.

In August 1989 Bronisław Geremek realized there was not a concrete economic plan, so Geremek and Kuroń initiated the formation of a team to draft the program that the Citizens' Parliamentary Club would then bring to the government to implement, which was known as "Beksiak's Team" due to it being led by Janusz Beksiak. Jeffrey Sachs was soon after invited to the project, who drew from his earlier plan with Kuroń, and who agreed to arrange external funding for the project to pay the experts, possibly from George Soros or the National Endowment for Democracy. Sachs heavily influenced Kuroń, convincing him of the need for an immediate, radical jump to a market economy. However, not everyone in Solidarity agreed with the approach: Ryszard Bugaj, a prominent economist, favored a gradualist or blended approach that focused more on social protections, but Kuroń and Geremek marginalized Bugaj by not telling him about Beksiak's team. However, the Beksiak Plan never came into fruition either, as OKP leadership including Geremek tried to distance themselves from the plan to avoid appearing as though they were trying to control the government's action. Geremek at the same time though felt like the drafted plan was too liberal and began looking for a blended program that included more social consideration, but the momentum for the Balcerowicz Plan was already building by this time.

Eventually, Kuroń was given the role of Minister of Labour and Social Policy in the cabinet of Prime Minister Tadeusz Mazowiecki on 13 September 1989. At the time, some newspapers considered it a surprise that he accepted the ministry, given that they called it difficult with the implementation of shock therapy and social conflicts. The role primarily meant at the time shielding people from the effects of shock therapy, which was Solidarity's plans for economic reforms. Kuroń's main economic problems he had to address in the ministry occurred after the Balcerowicz Plan was implemented. He inherited a disorganized pension system characterized by high inflation, so he had to heavily rely on using all the money he could from the budget to fund pensions. To protect reitees, he also introduced a mechanism that raised pensions in advance based on projecteed inflation. When actual inflation turned out lower than projected, it resulted in a budget disaster and caused some pensions to become higher than active salaries. He also introduced a law providing benefits for the unemployed, which became known as "kuroniówki". However, when implemented the benefits were granted to everyone without a job leading to hundreds of thousands of people claiming benefits immediately which led to a significant drain on the budget. When strikes broke out in May 1990 by railway workers in a wildcat action after shock therapy, first in Słupsk and then spreading across the country, he stated the government would not meet the strikers' demand as he stated it would jeopardize the government's economic reforms and encourage further strikes.

By June 1990, a large group of prominent Solidarity leaders broke away from Wałęsa's faction of Solidarity and quit the Solidarity Citizens' Committee to join the Citizens' Movement for Democratic Action (ROAD), accusing him of undermining the government and trying to centralize power prior to the 1990 Polish presidential election, which included Kuroń. Instead, Kuroń backed Mazowiecki for President, which led eventually led to a smear campaign by opposing parties who accused Mazowiecki's allies of either being Jews or aligned with "Zionist forces", the first of which being accused was Kuron. In December 1990, prior to his resignation, he worked with German Labour Minister Norbert Blüm to negotiate an agreement to allow a quota of 35,000 Polish workers to be legally employed in Germany under service contracts. In order to combat fraud in cross-border labour, they agreed on several legal pathways including promoting seasonal work between the two countries, creating legal holiday jobs, and legalizing commuting in border regions, although the number of illegal Polish workers in Germany afterwards still continued to far surpass the number of legal ones.

=== Second term (1992-93) ===
Kuron returned to the post of minister in the Cabinet of Hanna Suchocka on 11 July 1992, following the collapse of Jan Olszewski's cabinet. During the 1992–93 Polish strikes, he communicated to the strikers that while the issue was of state importance he would not meet the widespread demands. However, he still acted as the primary negotiator with the major trade unions (OPZZ, Solidarity, and Solidarity 80). In response to the strikes, he proposed a "social pact" to provide worker guarantees and prevent anti-recessionary policies while allowing the government to continue forth with reforms.

Primarily during his second term he focused on The Pact on State Enterprise, which he was the key architect of. He launched the proposal as a direction reaction to the wave of strikes that happened in Poland in the summer of 1992. It was then developed and disseminated by the deputies Michał Boni and Andrzej Bączkowski in the Sejm. The essence of the pact was to ensure that workers and administrative staff of state enterprises participate in what he stated was deciding the fate, transofrmation, and reform of their own companies, and to provide a framework for centralized negotiations specifically concerning wage ceilings. The goal was to achieve rapid privatization through the cooperation of employees because Kuroń believed that reforms should not be carried out "above society" and also he wanted to stop a mechanism where political parties "captured" the state to secure lucrative posts for people without qualifications which he described as corruptions. From the summer of 1992 to March 1993, negotiations took place between the government, trade unions, and employers to draw up specifics for the bills, but it was slowed by disputes within Suchocka's own coalition government. Specifically, a major pitfall was the six-month deadline given to workforces and unions to choose a privatization method, and if they failed to decide the power reverted back to the government with many arguing that workforces could not realistically make quick, informed decisions with a recession and high inflation.

Agreements were signed with major unions and in February 1993 it was signed, but to become law it needed to be still ratified by the Sejm. It was due to be presented to the Sejm, but the Sejm dissolved in May 1993 under a vote of no confidence until the September elections, with the government eventually falling in October following the coalition of SLD-PSL's victory in the elections, who chose not to adopt the main proposition. However, the element from it that did survive was the establishment of the Trilateral Commission, which was a Polish institution of social dialogue between the government, the OPZZ, and the management of the newly privatized companies.. He was replaced by Leszek Miller on 26 October 1993.

== Sejm years ==
After Kuroń broke away from Wałęsa and his Citizens' Parliamentary Club (OKP) by joining ROAD, he joined the Parliamentary Club - Democratic Union parliamentary group. In January 1991, when the last congress of ROAD happened prior to its collapse in May when it formally joined the Democratic Union, he criticized it as being a "negative compromise" as he felt like the party was not truly unified. During the elections for the National Council of the party, he received the highest numbers of votes to be President of the party, but he refused to accept it as he did not want to lead a party he had not personally founded and also due to resistance from the "unionists" who opposed merging ROAD with the Democratic Union, instead leaving the presidency to Władysław Frasyniuk. In the Sejm, he became known for speaking out against criminal sanctions for abortion, eventually becoming a member of the Extraordinary Sejm Commission for Abortion. He argued that morality and human behavior cannot be forced through legislation alone. In response to a parliamentary commission accepting a strict anti-abortion bill in May 1991, Kuroń and his allies from ROAD and the KLD began collecting signatures for a national referendum on the issue, to which opponents labelled him as ignoring "Christian moral truths" and natural law. He was also assigned in the Sejm during early 1991 to a rotating group of Polish MPs that dealt with Lithuania and the January Events after the Soviet military killed protestors in Lithuania, eventually meeting with Speaker Vytautas Landsbergis in a private meeting to formulate Poland's positions on Lithuania.

In the Sejm, he was eventually elected Deputy Chairman of the Democratic Union's parliamentary group alongside Aleksander Hall and was put in charge of the election campaign staff in 1991 in preparation for the 1993 Polish parliamentary election. In 1994, the Democratic Union merged with other parties into the Freedom Union. Upon entering the party, he became part of the leadership, but withdrew this in September 1994 which he stated was in order to make room for younger members in the party and to focus on his own works. He still continued to defend the necessity of quick economic reforms despite the social costs and unemployments in the Sejm, stating that the fall of Communism inevitably led to something that would not be perfectly managed. By this point, Gazeta Wyborcza considered him a leading figure in the parliament for the "camp of modernization" as they stated he bridged market-oriented reforms and social popularity as a member of the secular-liberal camp. It was also noted he was the most effective politician at bridging different voter groups and attracting voters for him during the election that were not secular-liberal.

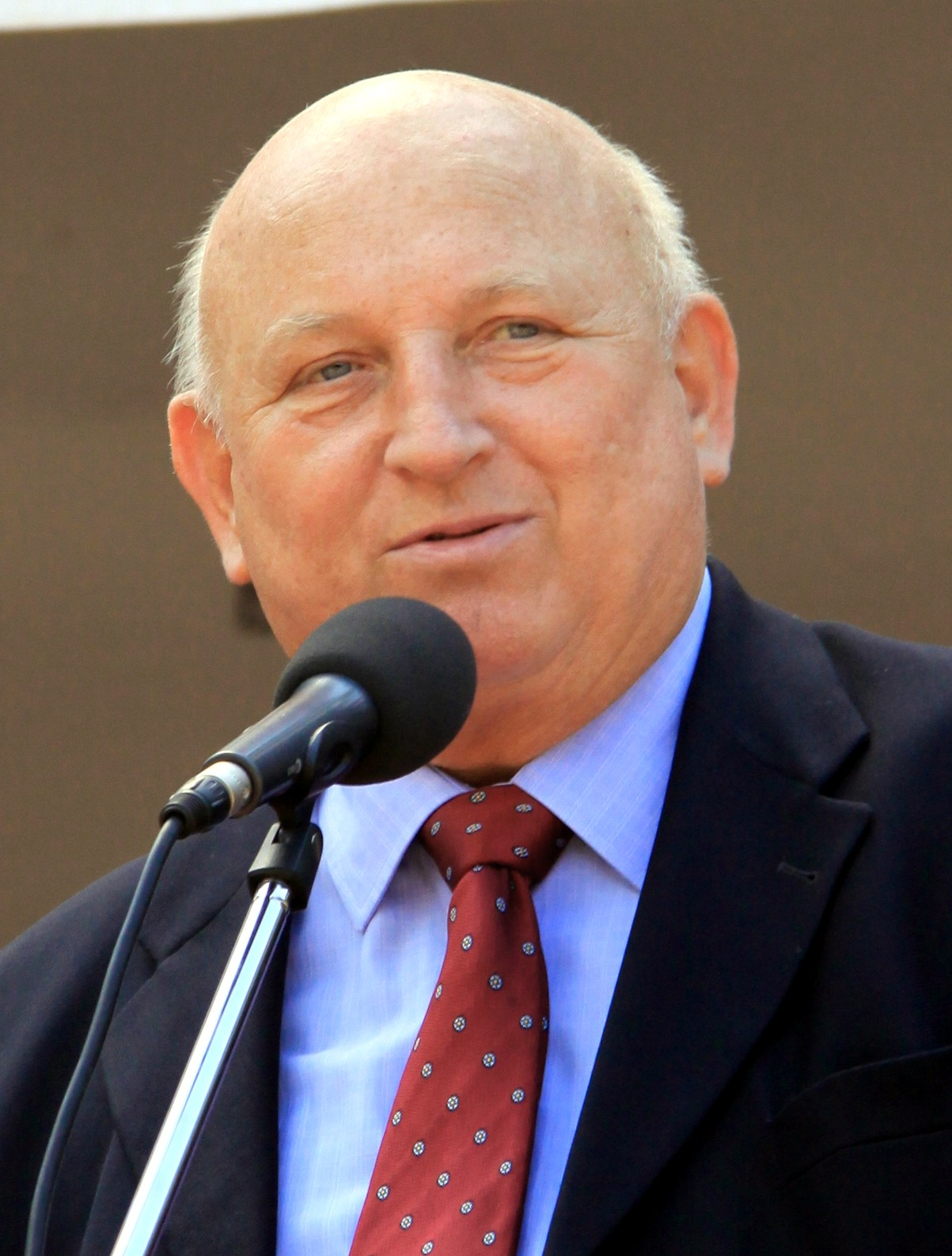
Kuroń defended former Communist Prime Minister Józef Oleksy (pictured here in 2009) against espionage allegations, isolating him in the Freedom Union.

In 1996, together with Modzelewski, he defended former Communist Prime Minister Józef Oleksy against allegations of him spying for Russia in an open letter. He believed the allegations were politically motivated and lambasted his party, which led to an isolation in his party of the Freedom Union as the union had supported the allegations. He was also driven to the sidelines by the party due to the poor election result when he ran in the 1995 presidential election garnering only 9.22% of the vote, and also he became more and more critical of the liberal economic policy that the party pursued. However, he was still kept high on the list for the union in the 1997 Polish parliamentary election, as he was candidate 2 behind Bronisław Geremek.

During his time in the Sejm, he became Chairman of the Sejm Commission for National and Ethnic Minorities. During this time, he worked on the treatment of the Romas in Poland, as he felt like the aggression against them had intensified in the late 1990s without any authorities intervening. He suggested the appointment of a prime minister's plenipotentiary and a council for minority affairs in order to address the issue. He was also a heavy supporter of the Ukrainian minority, especially Lemkos as he extensively visited Lemko villages in Ukraine, and advocated for rapprochement and for commemorating both sides of the Polish-Ukrainian War. He specifically stated that both sides had committed crimes against each other (for examples in Volhynia against Poles and in Przemyśl against Ukrainians), but that Ukraine needed to remain an independent state as he viewed that if Russia absorbed Ukraine it would be a large threat to the continuity of Poland. Even after leaving the chairmanship, he continued to defend minorities like the Jewish community against antisemitism, and defended the book Neighbors by Jan T. Gross which had exposed the Jedwabne pogrom of non-Jewish Polish people attacking Polish Jews during WWII, against outrage following its release.

After staying with the Freedom Union into the late 1990s, the party got into a conflict with its coalition partner, the Solidarity Electoral Action (AWS) in 2000, leading the union to leave the governrment that same year. Furthermore, the party starting rifting into factions between the "Uninoists" (led by Geremek) and the "Liberals" (led by Tusk), leading to the creation of a breakaway party called the Civic Platform. Consequently, due to this split, the union failed to win a single seat in the 2001 Polish parliamentary election and as a result Kuroń lost his mandate in the Sejm.

== 1995 presidential election ==
Opinion polling for the presidential election, he is in dark blue.

In February 1995, Kuroń officially announced his candidacy for the 1995 Polish presidential election. Upon announcing his desire to run, he wrote the Contract for Poland, which provided his proposals for solving the country's problems, and ran under the slogan "I am running because changes are necessary". On 2 April 1995, he was confirmed as the candidate for the Freedom Union, winning the vote to represent the union by a narrow margin of 242 votes to 231 despite having been the most popular politician in the party according to polls. In an opinion piece, French newspaper Le Monde at the time attributed this to him still being controversial due to his stints in prison and the fear that he would move the union towards the left and seek alliances with post-communists. In a separate analysis on the congress, Italian newspaper il manifesto argued that by abandoning his jeans (which he had continuously worn) for a jacket and tie was a mistake, which signaled an identity crisis. Also, while Kuroń identified as a man of the left, the union at the time was led by Leszek Balcerowicz, who was called an "ultra-liberal", which split the congress.

In April 1995, he suffered a serious accident while cycling in Łańsk (Olsztyn County), resulting in a skull injury and brain hematoma. Although he returned to the campaign in May, afterwards he subsequently experienced speech difficulties and tremors that affected public perception of his candidacy. He also lost support from many members of the Freedom Union as right-wing members like Jan Rokita publicly refused to vote for him in a move called the "3/4 initiative", and the liberal base that would support him, like the SLD or the Union of Labour, rallied behind Aleksander Kwaśniewski which only fragmented his votes. He was also attacked by the "Pampers", who were young right-wing journalists, for his early Marxist beliefs including Priest Tadeusz Rydzyk who accused him of "Stalinist crimes". Due to this, both his close friends Adam Michnik and Michał Boni suggested he withdrew from the race citing his health issues, but Kuroń refused. During his campaign, he also announced a project called the "Report on the State of the State", which collected letters from citizens and from intellectuals like Henryka Bochniarz and Jerzy Szacki about how Poland was faring.

At the time, he also refused to provide a total condemnation of Communist-era Poland, instead focusing on reforms. In addition, he also opposed mandatory membership in economic chambers, that all entrepreneurs should have the right to vote for chamber leadership, and argued for a strong, universally accepted economic self-government which could take over functions held by the state such as customs policies. He also announced that he would have former Minister of Defense Janusz Onyszkiewicz return as a key cabinet member if he won the Chancellory. Exit polls after the first round of voting for the election by the Public Opinion Research Center (OBOP) showed Kuroń gained the highest support from UD, KLD, and UP voters, in the Greater Polish region (most notably the Poznań Voivodeship), specialists and students, and those with a higher education. In the first round of voting, which concluded on 5 November 1995, he won 9.22% of the vote, thus not advancing to the run-off election where Wałęsa and Kwaśniewski competed against each other. Afterwards, for the run-off, he stated both candidates were bad choices but stated he preferred Wałęsa for President.

== Social engagements ==
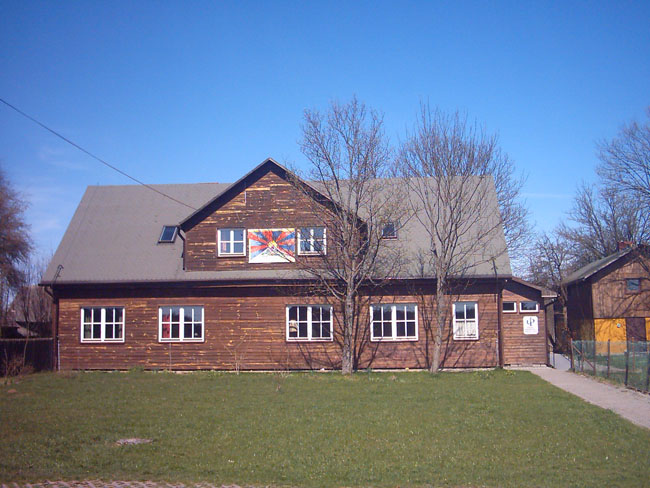
The Jan Józef Lipski Common University founded by Kuroń in Teremiski.

In March 1994, Kuroń as part of the management board of the "SOS Social Assistance" Foundation set up the first SOS food bank in Warsaw that gave free donations of food in cooperation with the government and organizations. It was mainly founded to initially supported people affected by shock therapy amid rising unemployment. They hosted annually summer camps for children with around 30,000 children, which became known under the slogan "Let's give children summer, let's give health". In its first year, the charity distributed 300 tons of food worth 4 billion old PLN to 7,000 people, and soon after in June 1994 it was admitted to the European Federation of Food Banks.

In 2000, Kuroń and his wife, Danuta, founded the Jan Józef Lipski Common University in Teremiski. He subsequently became the first dean of the informal university, until his death when the sociologist Zygmunt Bauman took over as dean until 2007. The university aimed to educate students for social life and democracy, alongside personal development, based on the ideas of Karol Małłek and N.F.S. Grundtvig. He founded it specifically based on his views of "social radicalism" and the belief that culture provides the answer to "how to live". It was aimed at improverished rural areas, often drawing from state agricultural farms, and the program spans five years. The university became known for its theatrical program, which has created plays based on the inhabitants of the village of Teremiski, which was known as "The Teremischan Tales". In 2009, the theatrical program premiered the tales in Wrocław and later in Teremiski. It also ran plays of "The Black Dress".

The formal, residential part of the university ended after the first decade due to "shifting funding models" after Poland joined the EU and transitioned into a cultural institution. Since then, it has established a virtual museum covering the heritage of Teremiski.

== Personal life ==
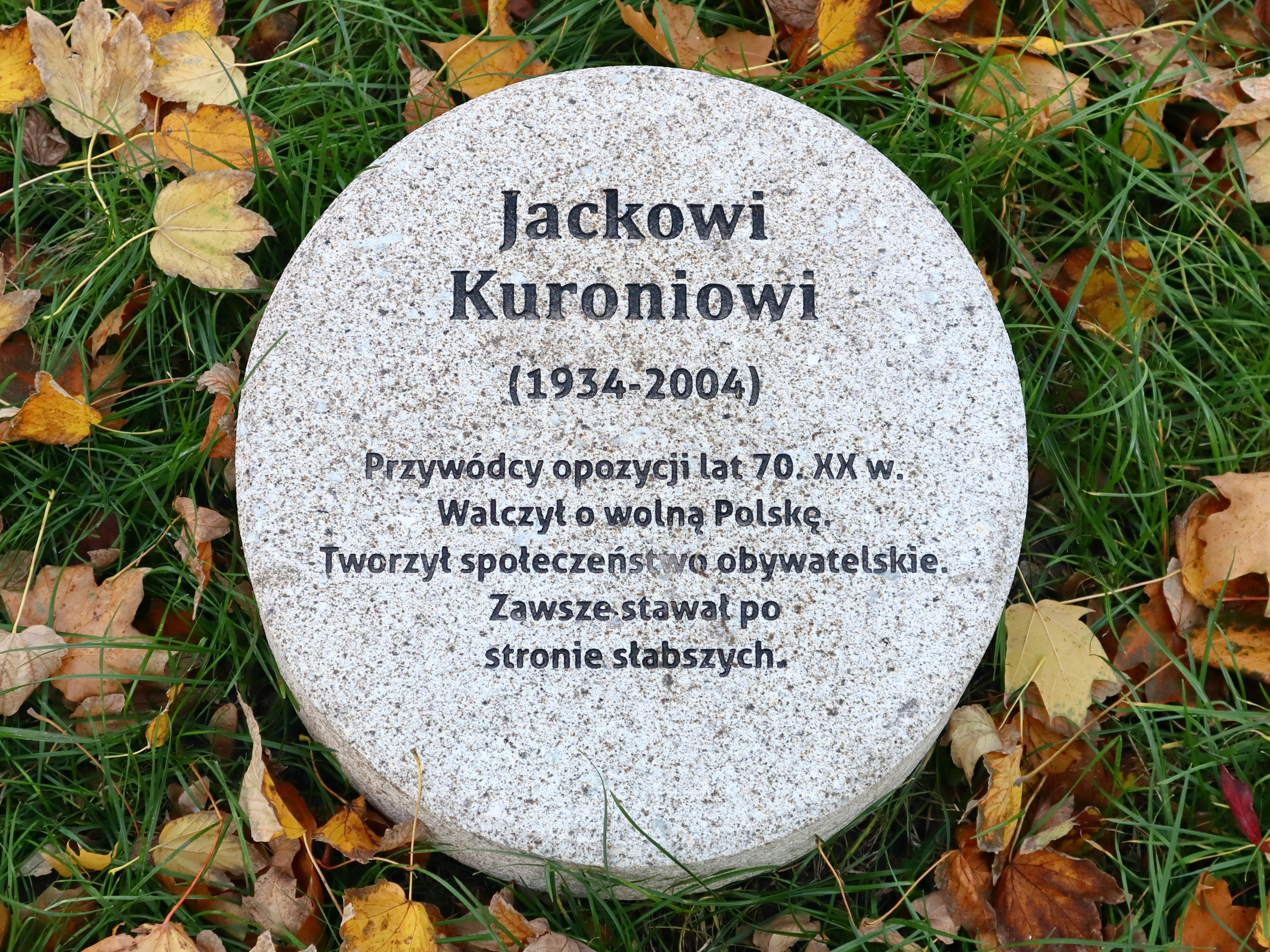
A commemoration for Kuroń in the Garden of the Righteous on Jura‑Gorzechowski Square in Warsaw.

Kuroń was first married to Grażyna Kuroń (often nicknamed Gaja; née Borucka) starting in 1959. They had met at the summer camps he organized in 1955 in Wolin with the ZMS, and a year later their son Maciej Kuroń was born, who would later become a renowned culinary publicist and author. Gaja was a strong support of Jacek's political activities, as during his conviction following the Open Letter she maintained contact with Jacek's colleagues of the discussion club at the University of Warsaw and when many of them were arrested in 1968 following protests she organized the sending of packages to the prisoners although she never actively joined KOR following its founding. In 1981, she was interned following the operation "Mewa" and the start of martial law in Gołdap and Darłówek. She was released in 1982 due to her falling health, and was eventually diagnosed with pulmonary fibrosis leading to her death in November 1982 while Jacek was still in prison. He eventually remarried in 1990 to Danuta Kuroń (née Filarska). Danuta had been a prominent social activist associated with Solidarity in Lublin, and after June 1989 she organized the parliamentary office of Jacek. She remained with him until his death in 2004, later working as a journalist.

Starting in the late 1990s, his health took a downward spiral after living with an abdominal aortic aneurysm, which he had to get surgery for in Paris in 1999, alongside atrial fibrillation, and throat cancer. He sought treatment at the Maria Skłodowska-Curie National Research Institute of Oncology for his cancer, but it destroyed his throat and led him to have chronic pneumonia and become dependent on portable oxygen. Following this, his kidney also failed. He had to have full-time care by a Ukrainian nurse, Sława Danyłko, which made him attempt to learn the Ukrainian language following the end of his political activities in 2001.

Kuroń died on 17 June 2004. His funeral was held on 26 June 2004. The funeral was attended by about 2,500 people, and included numerous current and former politicians in Poland, former members of Solidarity, students, and religious leaders. The funeral began with an outdoor mass in a park in the Żoliborz district, and prayers were spoken by Catholic, Orthodox, Jewish, Muslim, and Buddhist representatives. Then-President Aleksander Kwaśniewski placed the wreath on his grave. He was then buried in the Avenue of the Meritious in the Powązki Cemetery in Warsaw.

== Awards ==
=== International ===
Ribbon bar	Award or decoration	Country	Date	Reason	Ref
	Officer's Cross of the Legion of Honour	France	1993	The highest order of France. He received it for the "liberation of our Europe from communism."	
	Medal of 13 January	Lithuania	1992	For contributions to the restoration of the independence of Lithuania.	
	Medal of Merit, Second Degree	Czech Republic	2003	Awarded for service to the Czech Republic.	
	Grand Cross of the Order of Merit of the Federal Republic of Germany	Germany	Date unknown	The highest order of Germany. For building Polish-German relations.	
	Order of Prince Yaroslav the Wise	Ukraine	Date unknown	Awarded for distinguished services to the Ukrainian nation.	
	Order of the Lithuanian Grand Duke Gediminas	Lithuania	Date unknown	Awarded for individuals who distinguished themselves in work for Lithuania.	
	Knight of the Order of the Smile	International (as recognized by UNESCO)	2001	For distinguished service in the care and aid of children.	

=== Domestic ===
Ribbon bar	Award or decoration	Date	Reason	Ref
	Order of the White Eagle	1998	The highest order of Poland.	
	Silver Cross of Merit	1992	For contributions to Poland.	

In Poland, Kuron has had many things named after him. In Wrocław the previous Wieczysta Street was turned into Jacek Kuroń Street in 2008,, in addition to streets in Olsztyn, Lublin, Radom, Białystok,. In addition, there is a square named after him in the Żoliborz district of Warsaw a municipal park in Sosnowiec, and the Multicultural Humanities High School in Warsaw.

In his native hometown of Lviv, on 22 March 2018 the deputies of the Lviv City Council named the square that is in front of the Consulate General of Poland after Kuroń, which was supported by the Mayor of Lviv, Andriy Sadovy. Separately, in July 2002, the Lviv City Council unanimously also granted him the title of Honorary Citizen of Lviv supported by the centre-right party Our Ukraine.

== Bibliography ==
- Bikont, Anna (2018). Jacek (in Polish). Czarne: Agora S.A.
