= Oksana Ivanenko =

Ukrainian children's writer (1906–1997)

Oksana Ivanenko Оксана Іваненко
- Born: March 31, 1906; Poltava, Russian Empire
- Died: December 16, 1997 (aged 91); Kyiv, Ukraine
- Resting place: Baikove Cemetery, Kyiv
- Occupations: children's writer; translator
- Relatives: Dmytro Ivanenko (brother)
- Writing career
- Notable awards: Shevchenko National Prize; Order of Friendship of Peoples

Oksana Dmytrivna Ivanenko (Ukrainian: Оксана Дмитрівна Іваненко; March 31, 1906 – December 16, 1997) was a Ukrainian children's writer and translator. In 1974, she was the winner of the Lesia Ukrainka Literary Prize for the novels Рідні діти (Native Children), Тарасові шляхи (Taras Ways), and Лісові казки (Forest Tales). She was also the winner of the Shevchenko National Prize in 1986, for the book Завжди в житті (Always in Life). She was awarded the Order of Friendship of Peoples, three Orders of the Badge of Honor, and medals.

== Biography ==
Oksana Ivanenko was born in Poltava, March 31, 1906. She was the daughter of journalist and writer Dmytro Ivanenko, and teacher Lydia Ivanenko. Her brother was theoretical physicist, Dmytro Ivanenko. She was the mother of children's writer, Valeria Ivanenko.

Ivanenko studied at the gymnasium, and then at the workers' school. In 1922, she entered the Poltava Institute of Public Education.

Since 1925, her literary activity included the publication of a large number of books for children and youth. In 1926, she graduated from the Faculty of Social Education of the Kharkiv Institute of Public Education, and in 1931, she was an aspirant at the graduate school, Ukrainian Research Institute of Pedagogy, where she headed the section of children's literature in the Kyiv branch of this institute. She was an educator at the Gorky Children's Colony under Anton Makarenko. From 1932 to 1939, she worked for the Young Bolshevik publishing house, and from 1947 to 1951, for the «Барвінок (Periwinkle) magazine. From 1939 to 1957, she lived in Kyiv at the Roliti Writers' House.

Her works were published in a five-volume "Works" (vols. 1-5, 1984-1994). Ivanenko died in Kyiv on December 17, 1997. She was buried in Baikove Cemetery.

== Selected works ==
=== Children's literature ===
- "Mother and Frog" (1930)
- "Kindergarten" (1931)
- "Forest Tales" (1934)
- "Big Eyes" (1936)
- "Bumblebee" (1937)
- "Three Wishes" (1940)
- "Where did the crane fly" (1947)
- "Fairy Tales" (1958)

=== Short stories ===
- "Printer of Unseen Books" (1947, about Ivan Fedorovich)
- "Native Children" (1951)
- "Bogdan Khmelnytsky" (1954)
- "The Great Noise" (1967)

=== Novels ===
- Taras Ways (1961, the first two parts were published in 1939; about Taras Shevchenko)
- Maria (1973, 1977, 1986, 1988; about Mark Vovchko)

=== Screenplays ===
- Mountain Flower (1937)

=== Memoirs ===
- Always in Life (1985)

=== Translated works ===
- Turgenev by André Maurois - from French (1977)
- Malachite box by Pavel Bazhov - from Russian (1979)
- The Blind Musician, Children of the Dungeon by Vladimir Korolenko - from Russian
- Tales of Hans Christian Andersen - from Danish
- Tales of the Brothers Grimm - from German
