= Karol Modzelewski =

Polish historian, writer, politician, and academic (1937–2019)

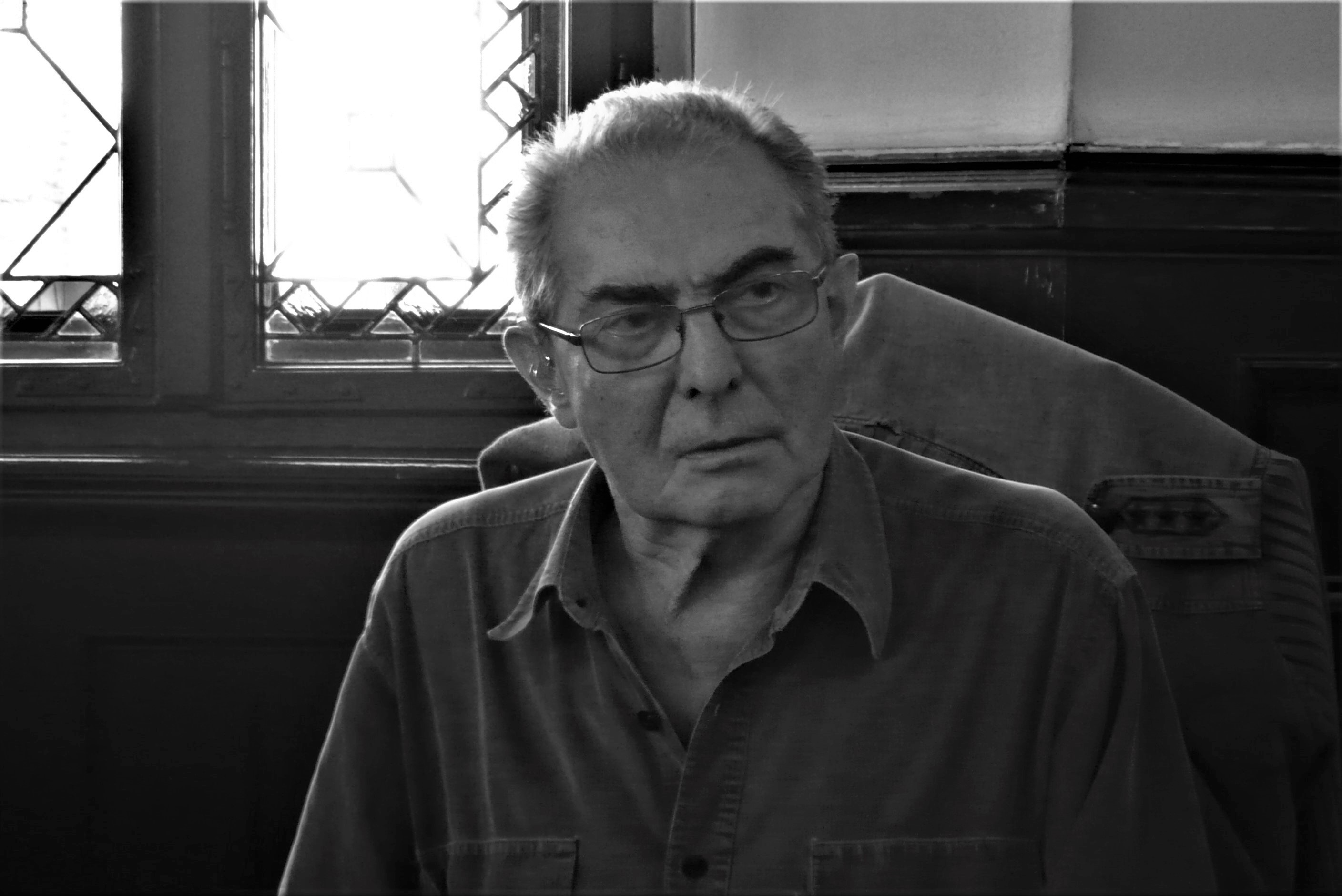
- Born: 23 November 1937; Moscow, Soviet Union
- Died: 28 April 2019 (aged 81); Warsaw, Poland
- Occupations: historian, writer, politician
- Awards: Legion d'Honneur (2016); Nike Award (2014); Prize of the Foundation for Polish Science (2007); Order of White Eagle (1998)

Signature
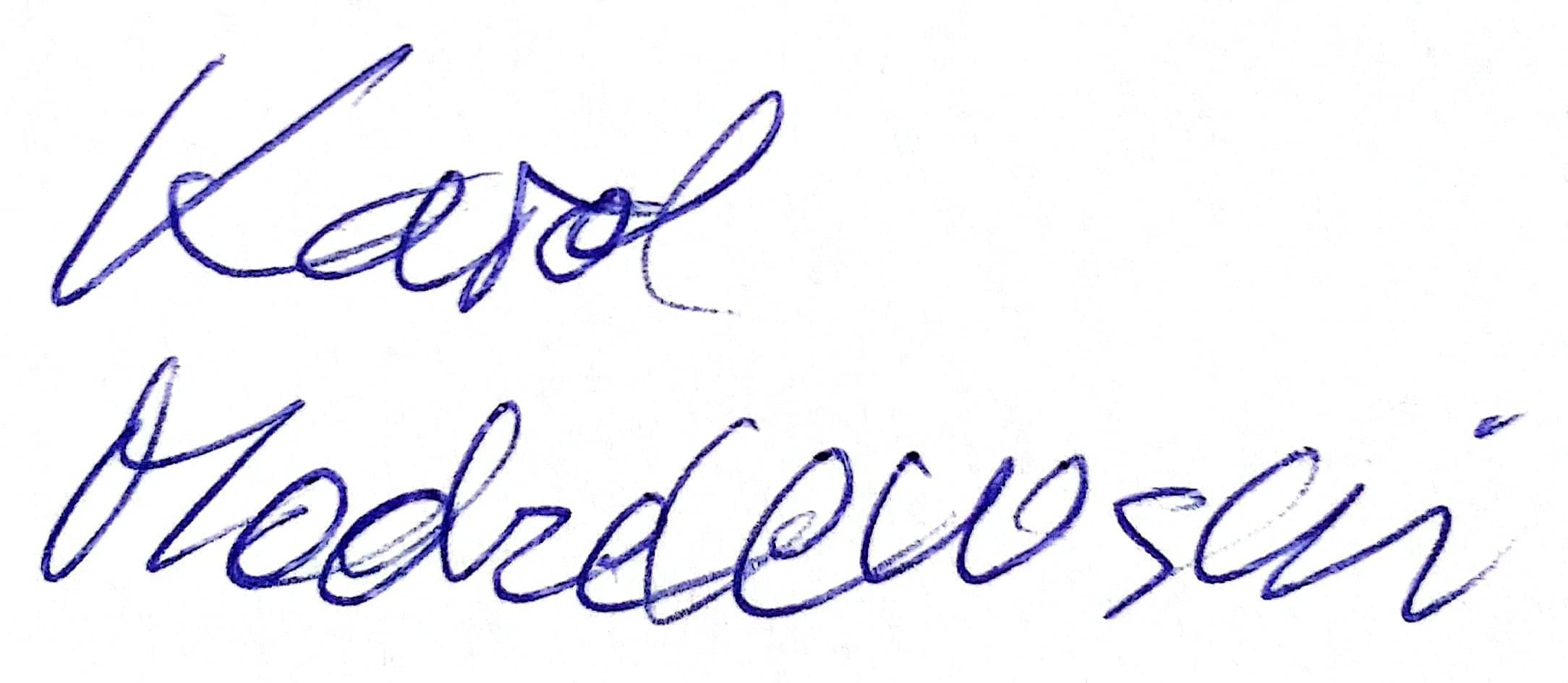

Karol Cyryl Modzelewski (Note: Born Kirill Budnevich.) (23 November 1937 – 28 April 2019) was a Polish historian, writer, politician and academic of Russian origin, one of the leading figures of the democratic opposition in the Polish People's Republic from the 1960s to the 1980s.

== Life and career ==
He was the adopted son of Zygmunt Modzelewski. A professor at the University of Wrocław and the University of Warsaw, he was a member of the Polish United Workers' Party but was expelled from it in 1964 for opposition to some policies of the party. With Jacek Kuroń he co-wrote the Open Letter to the Party, for which he was imprisoned for three years. He took part in the Polish 1968 political crisis, and for his activities he was again imprisoned for three and a half years.

During the 1980 strikes he came up with the name of 'Solidarity'. He was one of the Solidarity press contacts, and a member of the Solidarity region in Silesia. He was interned with many others during the martial law in Poland. From 1989 to 1991 he was a member of the Polish Senat (Solidarity Citizens' Committee), supporting the left-wing, particularly the Labour Union party and later Włodzimierz Cimoszewicz.

He died on 28 April 2019 in Warsaw.

== Awards and distinctions ==
In 1998, he was awarded Poland's highest distinction Order of White Eagle. In 2007, he won the Prize of the Foundation for Polish Science for his research on the emergence of the European identity revealing the importance of pre-Christian and multicultural tradition for the contemporary concept of Europe, presented in his work Barbarzyńska Europa ("Barbarian Europe").

In 2009, he received an honorary degree at the Kazimierz Wielki University in Bydgoszcz, and in 2014 he was the winner of the prestigious Nike Award for his autobiography entitled Zajeździmy kobyłę historii: wyznania poobijanego jeźdźca ("We'll Ride the Mare of History to the Ground: Confessions of a Bruised Rider") as well as the Kazimierz Moczarski History Award and the Józef Tischner Award. In 2016, he became an honorary citizen of the city of Wrocław and together with Róża Thun received the Order of Legion d'Honneur.

== Selected works ==
- Zajeździmy kobyłę historii. Wyznania poobijanego jeźdźca ("We'll Ride the Mare of History to the Ground: Confessions of a Bruised Rider"), Warsaw 2013
- Scènes de grèves en Pologne, Lausanne 2006
- Barbarzyńska Europa ("Barbarian Europe"), Warsaw 2004
- Życiodajny impuls chuligaństwa. Notatki z lat 1993–2002, Kraków 2003
- Opole, centena, pagus. Versuch einer komparativen Auffassung der Langemeinde und Territorialverwaltung, [in:] "Das Reich und Polen", Constance 2003
- La stirpe e la legge, [in:] "Studi sulle societa e le culture del Medioevo per Girolamo Arnaldi", Rome 2002
- Zemsta, okup i podmiot moralny w prawach barbarzyńskich, [in:] "Aetas media, aetas moderna. Studia ofiarowane profesorowi Henrykowi Samsonowiczowi w siedemdziesiątą rocznicę urodzin", Warsaw 2000
- Organizacja gospodarcza państwa piastowskiego X-XIII wiek, Wrocław 1975, Poznań 2000
- Liber homo sub tutela nobilis, [in:] "Kościół, kultura, społeczeństwo. Studia z dziejów średniowiecza i czasów nowożytnych", Warsaw 2000
- Dokąd od komunizmu?, Warsaw 1993
- Między umową a wojną, Warsaw 1989
- Chłopi w społeczeństwie polskim ("Peasants in Polish Society"), Wrocław 1987
- Revolutionary marxist students in Poland speak out (1964–1968), New York 1969
- List otwarty do partii ("Open Letter to the Party") (co-written by Jacek Kuroń), Paris 1966

== See also ==
- Nike Award
- History of Poland
- Polish literature
- List of Polish-language authors
