= Dergachyov =

Dergachyov or Dergachev (Russian: Дергачёв, from дергать meaning to pull) is a Russian masculine surname, its feminine counterpart is Dergachyova or Dergacheva. It may refer to

- Alexander Dergachyov (born 1996), Russian ice hockey player
- Nikolai Dergachyov (born 1994), Russian association football forward
- Vladimir Dergachev (born 1945), Ukrainian expert in geopolitics
- Yelena Dergachyova (born 1995), Russian ice hockey forward
