= Open Letter to the Party =

Open letter critiquing the PZPR

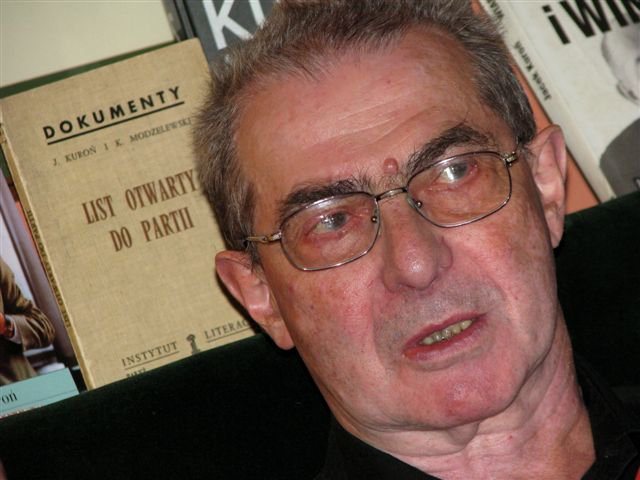
- Modzelewski with a copy of the Open Letter to the Party in the background
- Original title: List otwarty do partii
- Created: March 1965
- Authors: Jacek Kuroń; Karol Modzelewski
- Signatories: Stanislaw Gomolka; Joanna Majerczyk; Eugeniusz Chyla
- Media type: Open Letter
- Subject: Critique of the Polish United Workers' Party

The Open Letter to the Party (Polish: List otwarty do partii) was a document written, and then distributed in March 1965, by Jacek Kuroń and Karol Modzelewski critiquing the Polish United Workers' Party (PZPR).

== Background and publication ==
Following October 1956 many members of the Union of Polish Youth (ZMP) were left unsatisfied with the extent of the reforms. Among them were Karol Modzelewski and Jacek Kuroń, at the time history students at the University of Warsaw. With the closure of Po Prostu magazine, the organ of the ZMP, by the authorities the following year some became so disaffected they withdrew from political action altogether while others, including Kuroń and Modzelewski, chose to bide their time within party organisations. The former became active within the newly re-formed Polish Scouting and Guiding Association while the latter became a member of the PZPR at his university.

In 1962 the pair established a political discussion club at the University of Warsaw which was open to participants from outside the university. The group soon attracted the attention of the intelligence services and in 1963 was put under surveillance. By May of that year the activities of the club were suspended by the regional committee of the PZPR and it was ultimately dissolved. On 14 April 1964 a rally was held at the University of Warsaw in support of the signatories of the Letter of 34, leading to further conflict with the local PZPR.

An unofficial group critical of the PZPR soon adhered around Kuroń and Modzelewski with the intention of producing a publication that would analyse the party from a Marxist and Trotskyist perspective. The Security Service wire tapped members of the group and arrested Kuroń and Modzelewski in November 1964. Although they were soon released, the pair, alongside several of their associates, were expelled from the PZPR. Kuroń and Modzelewski authored a new version of the publication they had been working on. On 18 March 1965 they distributed their Open Letter to the Party amongst fellow students and the university's PZPR committee, as well as Aleksander Gieysztor.

== Contents ==
The Open Letter was a public attack on the nature of the party bureaucracy. Kuroń and Modzelewski argued it formed a new elite class that worked against the interests of the Polish working-classes. Split over 11 chapters the text outlined a history of the bureaucratic monopolisation of the Polish state. According to the two authors factors which had contributed to the formation of this class included the backward economic situation of Poland, the presence of the Red Army in Poland, and the reliance on the Soviet bureaucracy itself.

== Aftermath ==
Following the publication and dissemination of their Open Letter Kuroń and Modzelewski were arrested and received sentences of three and three and a half years in prison respectively. Three co-defendants, Kazimierz Badowski, Ludwik Hass, and Romuald Smiech, were tried and sentenced in secret. The latter were all members of a minor Trotskyist anti-Stalinist dissident group.

In protest at the sentences Isaac Deutscher penned his own Open Letter To Władysław Gomułka and the Central Committee of the Polish United Workers Party in which he questioned the legitimacy of the trials, the dedication of those in Gomułka's government to communism, as well as Gomułka's personal commitment to de-Stalinisation.

== Criticism ==
The historian Wolfgang Weber has been critical of the authors of the Open Letter describing their text as “bourgeois group sociology embellished with Marxist terms”. Rather than a critique from a Marxist or Trotskyist perspective, as is often attributed to the pair, he has argued that their Open Letter espoused an ahistorical and reactionary position comparable to what he claims are pro-Stalinist arguments later put forward by the French historian Jean Elleinstein.

== Legacy ==
Although the historian Norman Davies has dismissed the influence of Kuroń's ideological critique on the later opposition movement, the journalist Roman Graczyk has argued that Kuroń and Modzelewski's Open Letter and subsequent imprisonment acted as a catalyst that accelerated the political maturity of the young opposition movement within Poland.

The Open Letter has been seen as an influential text in providing the intellectual impetus to the protests of 1968. Within Poland, David Ost describes leading activists in the 1968 Polish student protests, such as Adam Michnik and Jan Lityński as "followers and admirers" of the Open Letter. When the student leader Daniel Cohn-Bendit stood trial for his role during May 1968 in France he gave his name as Kuroń-Modzelewski.

Responding to an article published in Kultura in 1977, Hass would go on to pen his own Open Letter to Ozjasz Szechter, in which he critiqued Stalinism and the communist bureaucracy in Poland. In 2013 Sławomir Sierakowski, the editor-in-chief of Krytyka Polityczna, published an Open Letter to the Parties the title of which was in direct reference to Kuroń and Modzelewski's Open Letter.

== See also ==
- Letter of 34
- Letter of 59
