= Danuta Kuroń =

Polish activist

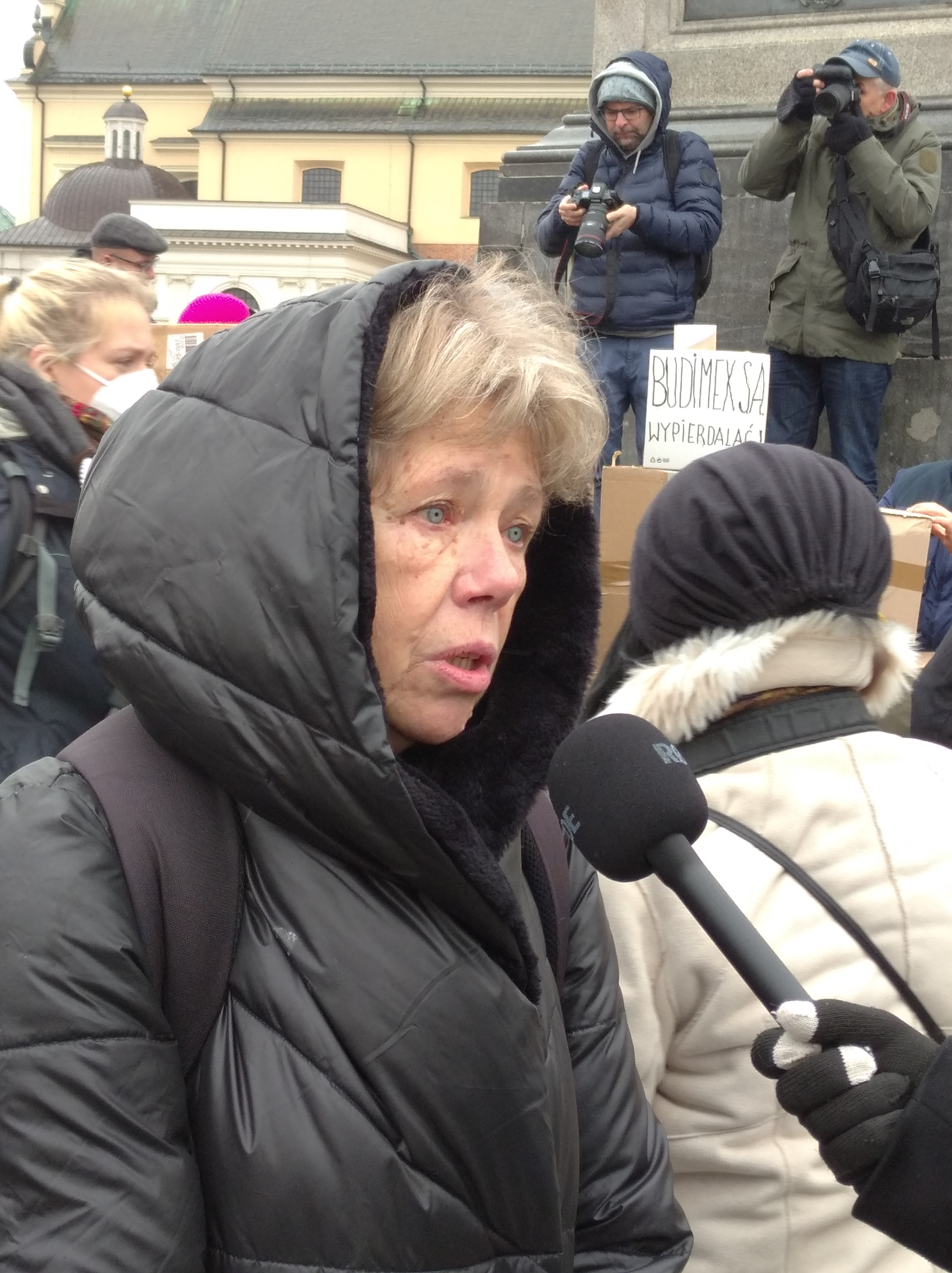
- Born: Danuta Filarska; 1949 (age 76–77)
- Occupations: Activist; Union organizer
- Awards: Knight's Cross, Order of Polonia Restituta; Order of the Smile

Danuta Kuroń (née Filarska, previously Winiarska; born 1949) is a Polish trade union and democratic activist. She was an underground organizer for the trade union Solidarity in the Polish People's Republic, and she edited and contributed reporting to their periodicals.

== Life and career ==
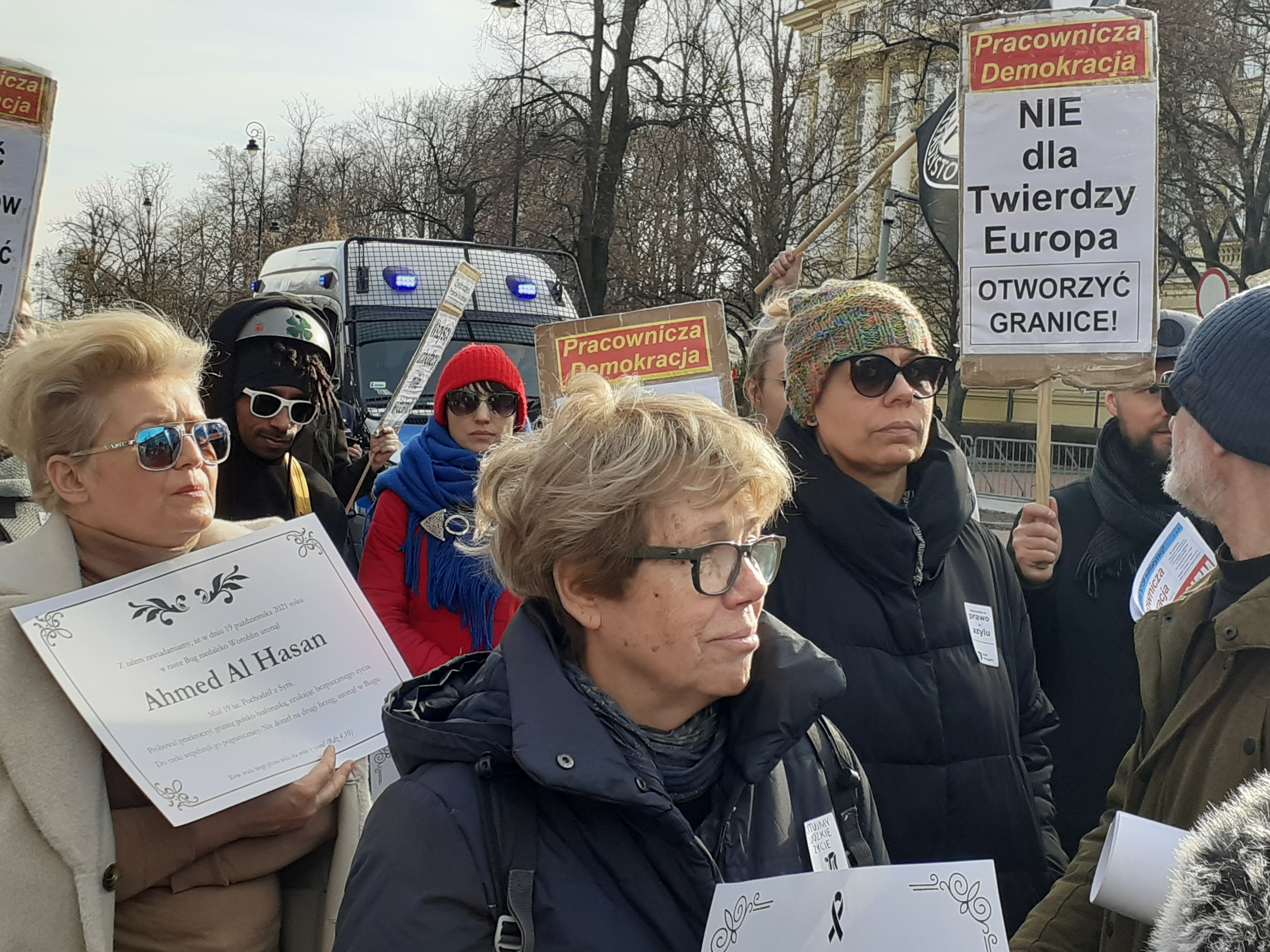
Danuta Kuroń in 2023.

Kuroń studied history at the University of Warsaw from 1968 to 1970, and in 1976 she graduated with a history degree from the John Paul II Catholic University of Lublin. From 1980 to 1981 she was the editor of prominent trade union magazines. Throughout the early 1980s she was heavily involved in underground union and strike organizing, particularly the union Solidarity. Her work as a union activist, and her activity with Solidarity, was documented by Shana Penn (pl) in her 2003 book Podziemie kobiet (published in 2006 in English as Solidarity's Secret: The Women who Defeated Communism in Poland).

Kuroń covered the Polish Round Table Agreement for the Information Service of Solidarity, and helped establish the parliamentary office of her husband Jacek Kuroń following his election to the Sejm in the 1989 Polish legislative election. She was subsequently involved with the Citizens' Movement for Democratic Action, and worked for Gazeta Wyborcza.

In 2000, Danuta and Jacek Kuroń founded the Jan Józef Lipski Common University in Teremiski.

In 2011, Kuroń was awarded the Knight's Cross of the Order of Polonia Restituta. Kuroń also received the Order of the Smile.

Kuroń was a member of the Consultative Council in 2020.

== Selected awards ==
- Knight's Cross, Order of Polonia Restituta (2011)
- Order of the Smile
