= Gorky Colony =

1920s reform school in the Soviet Union

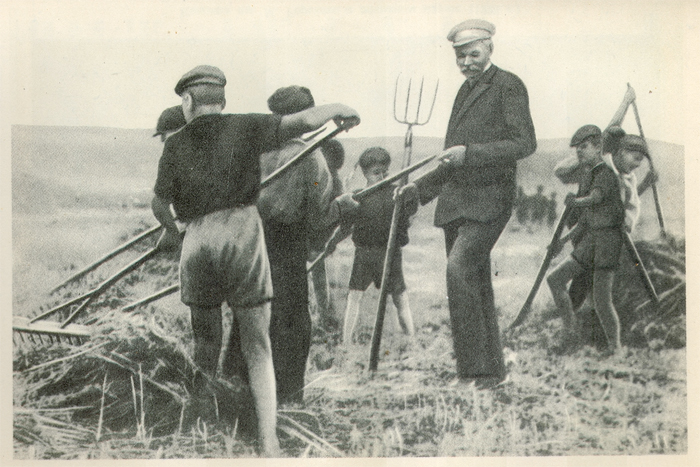
Children working at the colony

The Gorky colony was a reform school for street children and juvenile delinquents in the 1920s, located in the Poltava Raion. The colony is the basis of the classic Soviet book, The Road to Life, written by the colony's director, Anton Makarenko.

== Legacy ==
In the period after World War II, teachers in Eastern Europe followed Soviet pedagogical theory, primarily that of Makarenko. His methods emphasized principles of peer pressure, indoctrination, and communalism, and his book about the Gorky colony highlighted the joys of collective labor. Makarenko, who was Joseph Stalin's favorite pedagogue, believed that all children could be made into model Soviet citizens through teamwork and focus on working for the group's welfare. Makarenko's followers were less nuanced with their implementation of his ideas. Historian Anne Applebaum likened the rough adaptation of Makarenko's ideas to a straightforward ideological indoctrination. Beyond Eastern Europe, teachers in the Western progressive education tradition, with principles of creativity, spontaneity, and child-centeredness, also adopted Makarenko's techniques.

== Notable people ==
- Oksana Ivanenko (1906–1997), Ukrainian children's writer and translator
