= The Pedagogical Poem =

Book by Anton Makarenko

- Author: Anton Makarenko
- Original title: Педагогическая поэма
- Language: Russian
- Publisher: Khudozhestvennaya Literatura
- Publication date: 1925-1935
- Publication place: USSR
- Media type: Print (Hardback and paperback)
- Followed by: Flags on the Battlements

The Pedagogical Poem (Russian: Педагогическая поэма, romanized: Pedagogičeskaâ poèma, published in English as Road to Life) is widely known throughout the world as the most significant work of the Soviet educator and writer A.S. Makarenko (1888-1939). The 1925-1935 novel contains an artistic and documentary description of the formation (in 1920 near Poltava) and the leadership (by the author until the middle of 1928) of the Gorky Colony (named after Gorky), where it was possible to very successfully return homeless minors and offenders to a full-fledged and cultural social life on the basis of feasible socially useful work and of thoughtful and reasonable involvement of the pupils in co-management of a single team.

== Plot ==
Written in 1925-1935 and published in three parts in 1933-1935. Part 1 of the novel came out in 1933 (in the Year XVII Almanac, part 3), Part 2 in 1935 (Year XVIII Almanac, book 5) and part 3 later the same year (Year XVIII Almanac, book 8). As a separate edition, the book came out 1937, through Khudozhestvennaya Literatura.

The "Pedagogical Poem" in an artistic presentation tells about the educational and pedagogical experience that arose in the colony for juvenile offenders, created near Poltava and led from 1920 to 1928 by the author (Makarenko). It is about the support of the mentioned approach to re-education on the part of responsible business executives, and about the categorical rejection of the Makarenko system on the part of the "Pedagogical Olympus" - the leadership of the Narobraz, which led to Makarenko's dismissal from the Colony in 1928 and the termination of this educational experience in it.

The fictionalized account of Makarenko's work at the two rehabilitations centers for juvenile offenders (the Gorky Colony and Dzerzhinsky labour commune) came out with a dedication to "our chief, friend and teacher Maxim Gorky". The latter was instrumental in the novel's creation, development and publication. He visited both colonies and corresponded with Makarenko. "[Your] enormously important and amazingly successful educational experiment is of world-wide significance," he wrote in one of the letters.

Despite the success of Makarenko's educational experiments, they caused controversy and much debate among his Soviet colleagues. In 1938 he was awarded the Order of the Red Banner of Labour, but only for this highly successful novel hailed as a Soviet classic, not for his work as an innovative educator and social worker.

== Editions ==
The novel was written in 1925-1935. After reading the draft of its first part, Maxim Gorky strongly advised the author to finish the work and contributed significantly morally, organizationally, and sometimes financially to that task.

The book has been published in several editions:

- The author's original version (with some participation by M. Gorky), published in almanacs and the first book edition in 1935.
- The 1937 edition, significantly shortened and revised at the insistence of the author's wife as well as editors. This abridged edition of the book formed the basis of most subsequent editions in Russian and translations of the work into foreign languages.
- The scholarly edition of 2003, edited by the Makarenko expert S. Nevskaya.
