= Flags on the Battlements =

1938 novella by Anton Makarenko

- Author: Anton Makarenko
- Original title: Флаги на башнях
- Language: Russian
- Publisher: Khudozhestvennaya Literatura
- Publication date: 1938, Krasnaya Nov; 1939, separate edition
- Publication place: USSR
- Media type: Print (hardback & paperback)
- Preceded by: Book for the Parents

Flags on the Battlements (Russian: Флаги на башнях, romanized: Flagi na bashnyakh) is a novella by Anton Makarenko, written in 1938 and published the same year in Krasnaya Nov magazine (issues 6-8). In 1939 the book came out as a separate edition through Khudozhestvennaya Literatura. This later version was considerably revised: it featured the new chapter "Unbelievable!" (Не может быть!), while one of the final chapters of the magazine-published version ("For the Rest of Our Lives", На всю жизнь) has been removed. The book was translated into English under the title Learning to Live.

Flags on the Battlements could be seen as a sequel to the 1932 novella March of the 30th Year and continues the story of the Dzerzhinsky Colony. The action in it takes place in 1931-1932.
