= Vladimir Dergachev =

Russian geographer and geopolitician

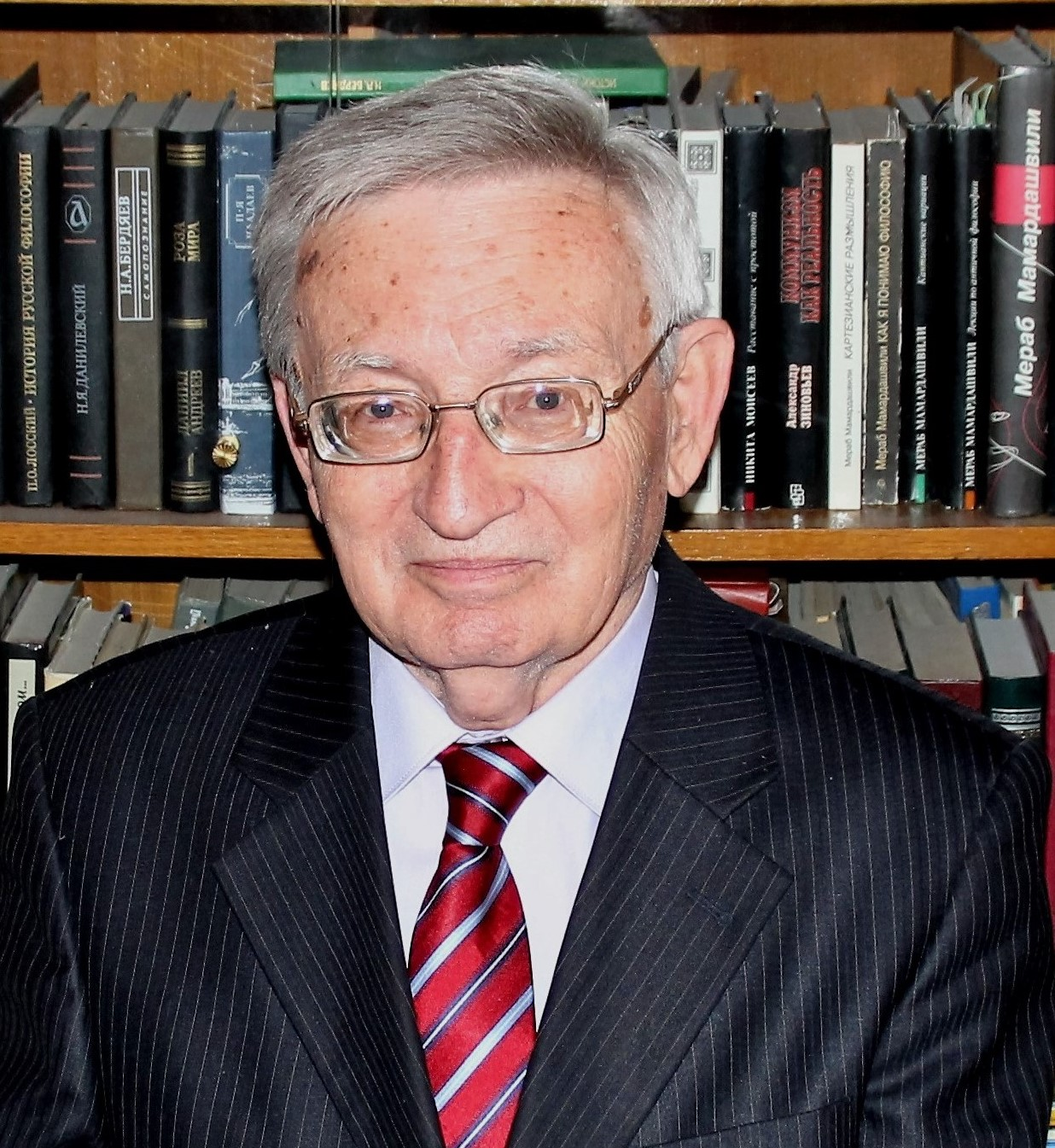
Vladimir Dergachev

Vladimir Alexandrovich Dergachev (Russian: Владимир Александрович Дергачёв, Ukrainian: Володимир Олександрович Дергачов; born 9 September 1945) is a Russian geographer whose professional activity is focused on geopolitics. He is a member of the Union of Journalists of Ukraine and, since 1976, of the Institute of Market Problems and Economic-Environmental Research of the Academy of Sciences of the Ukrainian SSR and its successor, the National Academy of Sciences of Ukraine. He is also an honorary member of the Ukrainian Geographical Society.

== Early life and education ==
Vladimir Dergachev was born on 9 September 1945 in Zabaykalsky Krai, Russian SFSR, in the family of a military officer. He completed his schooling in Astrakhan in 1962, before moving to Moscow for his university studies. In 1967 he graduated with a degree in economic geography from the Geography faculty of Moscow State University, where he also completed his aspirantura in 1976, under the supervision of Yulian Saushkin, and in 1987 obtained the degree of Doktor nauk in Geography.

== Professional activity ==
After graduation in 1967 Dergachev worked as an engineer-economist for Gosstroy in the Byelorussian SSR and in the meteorological service of the Soviet Armed Forces, achieving the rank of senior lieutenant. In the 1971-1972 period he held a scientific position at the Pacific Institute of Geography of the Far East branch of the Academy of Sciences of the Soviet Union, before returning to Moscow for his postgraduate studies. He has resided in Odesa since 1976, remaining in the country after independence. Dergachev held a professorship in international economics at Odessa State University between 1976 and 1991, concurrently with his research position at the National Academy of Sciences of Ukraine. In 1998 he founded the Institute for Geostrategic Technologies (Geopolitics) of Professor Dergachev, which he later transformed into a website where he publishes a series of electronic journals as well as his own articles. Between 2001 and 2018 he returned to the now renamed Odesa National University, where he held a professorship in economics, and since 2016 he has taught at Odesa National Maritime University.

== Publications ==
Dergachev has authored over 700 scientific and popular writings, and is a frequent contributor to both Russian and Ukrainian media. The following are some of his publications:

Books (in Russian):

- Geopolitika (Kyiv: VIRA-R, 2000) ISBN 966-95440-5-X
- Geoekonomika (Kyiv: VIRA-R, 2002) ISBN 966-7807-15-0
- Tsivilizatsionnaya geopolitika: Geofilosofiia (Kyiv: VIRA-R, 2004) ISBN 966-7807-17-7
- Geopolitika: Uchebnoe posobie (Moscow: UNITI-DANA, 2004) ISBN 5-238-00779-5
- Regionovedenie (Moscow: UNITI-DANA, 2004, co-authored by L.B. Vardomsky) ISBN 5-238-00765-5
- Mezhdunarodnye ekonomicheskie otnosheniia (Moscow: UNITI-DANA, 2005) ISBN 5-238-00863-5
- Globalistika (Moscow: UNITI-DANA, 2005) ISBN 5-238-00957-7
- Geopoliticheskii slovar-spravochnik (Kyiv: KNT, 2009) ISBN 978-966-373-499-6

Articles:

- "Исторические циклы хозяйственного освоения территории", Вестник Московского университета. Серия геогр., 1976, № 2 (in Russian, translated into English as "Historical Cycles of Economic Development of a Territory", Soviet Geography, Vol. XVIII, No 6, 1977, pp. 410—414).
- "Природно-хозяйственная контактная зона «суша-океан»", Известия Всесоюзного географического общества, 1980, том 112, вып.1 (in Russian, translated into English as "The Physical-Economic Contact Zone Be-tween Land and Sea", Soviet Geography, Vol. XXII, No 8, 1981, pp. 484—491).
- "Peculiarities in the Formation of Populated Places on the Seaboard of the USSR", Soviet Geography, vol. XXVII, No 3, 1986, pp. 143—155.
