= Anton Makarenko =

Soviet educator, social worker and writer

Anton Semyonovich Makarenko
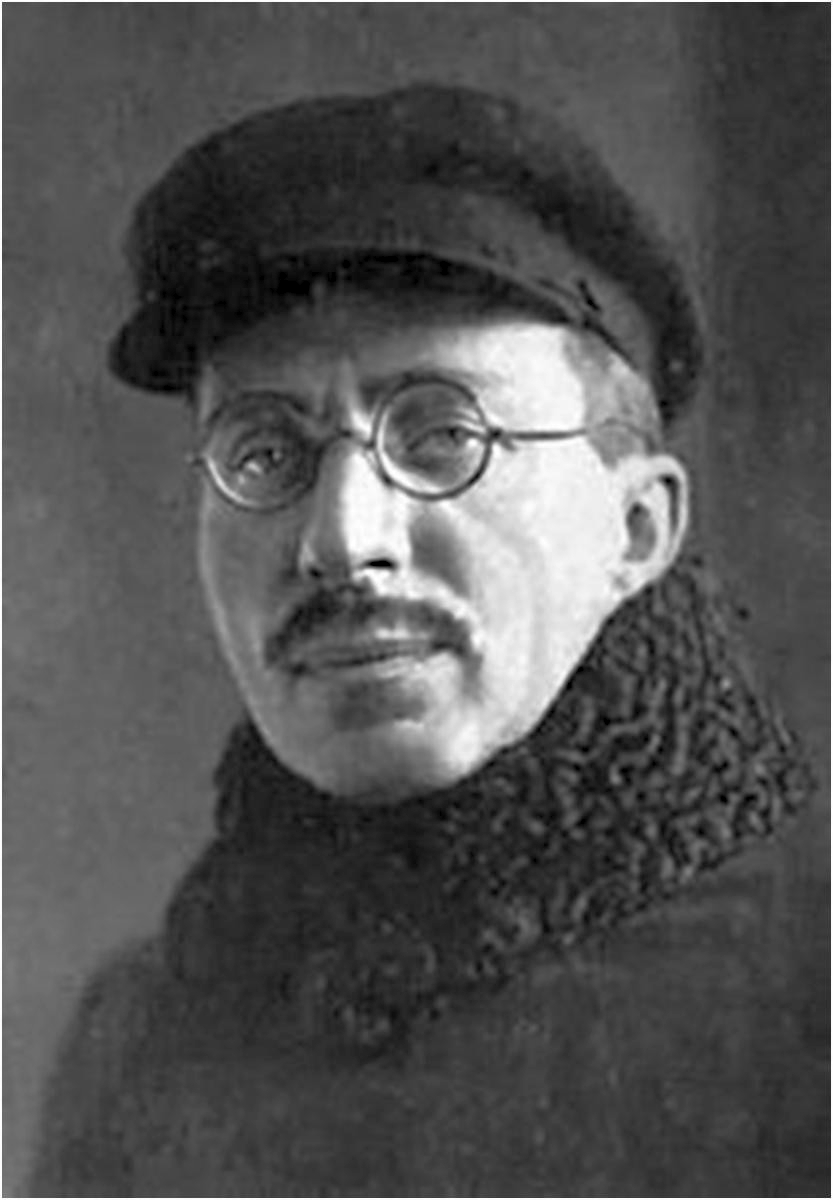
- Born: Антон Семёнович Макаренко; 13 March 1888; Belopolye, Sumsky Uyezd, Kharkov Governorate, Russian Empire (now Sumy Oblast, Ukraine)
- Died: 1 April 1939 (aged 51); Golitsyno, Russian SFSR, Soviet Union
- Citizenship: Soviet
- Occupations: Educator, writer
- Writing career
- Language: Russian
- Subjects: Educational theory, Pedagogy, Correctional education

Anton Semyonovich Makarenko (Russian: Анто́н Семёнович Мака́ренко, Ukrainian: Антон Семенович Макаренко, romanized: Anton Semenovych Makarenko; 13 March [O.S. 1 March] 1888 – 1 April 1939), was a Soviet educator, social worker and writer. He became the most influential educational theorist in the Soviet Union; along with promoting principles in educational theory and practice. As one of the founders of Soviet pedagogy, he elaborated the theory and methodology of upbringing in self-governing child collectives and introduced the concept of productive labor into the educational system. Makarenko's books have appeared in many countries.

In the aftermath of the Revolution of 1917, he established self-supporting orphanages for street children — including juvenile delinquents — left orphaned by the Russian Civil War of 1917-1923. These establishments included the Gorky Colony and later the Dzerzhinsky labor commune (where the FED camera was produced) in Kharkiv. Makarenko wrote several books, of which The Pedagogical Poem (Педагогическая поэма; published in English as The Road to Life), a fictionalized story of the Gorky Colony, became especially popular in the Soviet Union. A 1955 Soviet movie with English title Road to Life was based on this book. Makarenko died under unclear circumstances in 1939.

In 1988 UNESCO ranked Makarenko as one of four educators (along with John Dewey, Georg Kerschensteiner, and Maria Montessori) who determined the world's pedagogical thinking of the 20th century.

== Biography ==
=== Early life and education ===
Anton Semyonovich Makarenko was born in Belopolye, Sumsky Uyezd, Kharkov Governorate, Russian Empire, to Semyon Grigoryevich Makarenko (Semen Hryhorovych Makarenko), who worked at a railway depot as a painter, and Tatyana Mikhaylovna (Tetiana Mykhailivna, née Dergachova), daughter of a soldier from Mykolaiv.

In September 1905, having graduated from a four-year college in Kremenchuk, Makarenko took a one-year teachers' course and at the age of seventeen, began teaching at a railway college at Dolinskaya station near Kherson where he worked from September 1911 till October 1914. In August 1912, Makarenko entered the Teachers' Institute in Poltava and in July 1917 graduated with a gold medal. After graduating from the institute, Makarenko became a teacher at the Poltava Higher Primary School, where he worked until the end of 1917. In December 1917, he moved to Kryukiv.

In August 1914 he enrolled into the Poltava Training College, but had to interrupt his education and in September 1916 joined the Russian Army, from which he was demobilized in March 1917, due to poor eyesight. The same year he graduated the college with honours.

=== Career ===
Makarenko went on to work as a teacher in Poltava and later Kryukov where, in 1919, he became the local college's director.

==== Gorky Colony ====
In 1920 he was invited to head the Poltava Colony for Young Offenders. A year later it became the Gorky Colony and soon attracted the attention of Maxim Gorky himself. In 1923 Makarenko published two articles on the Gorky Colony (in Golos Truda newspaper and Novimy Stezhkami magazine) and two years later made a public report at the All-Ukrainian Conference for the orphanage teachers. By the summer of 1925, the colony had 140 pupils - 130 boys and 10 girls. In the same year the question of creation of the Komsomol organization is solved.

==== Dzerzhinsky labour commune ====
In 1927 Makarenko was appointed as the head of the Dzerzhinsky labour commune, an orphanage for street children near Kharkov, where the most incorrigible thieves and swindlers were known to be put into rehabilitation. Makarenko succeeded in gaining their respect, combining in his method insistence and respect, school education and productive labour.

==== Reception ====
However, 1928 saw the onset of a wave of criticism aimed at Makarenko. In March 1928 his report at the Ukrainian Pedagogical Institute concerning his work in the Gorky Colony received hostile treatment. In September of that year he was fired from the Gorky Colony, and had to concentrate on his work in Kharkiv.

On September 3, 1928, Makarenko was released from the post of head of the Gorky colony. 1929–1936 mainly related to the work of Anton Semenovich in the commune named after Dzerzhinsky. At the heart of the collective of Communards were 60 educators of the colonies sent to the commune in 1927. January 15, 1928 кomsomol organization was established in the commune. On July 1, 1930, the commune became fully self-sufficient.

Makarenko's methods were highly appreciated by Maxim Gorky who believed that his "amazingly successful educational experiment [was] of world-wide significance." The correspondence between the two started in July 1925 and continued until Gorky's death. In 1928 the famous writer visited the two colonies and left much impressed; next year in an essay called "Over the Union of Soviets" he hailed Makarenko as "the new type of pedagogue."

==== Book publications ====
Encouraged by Gorky, whom he admired, Makarenko wrote The Pedagogical Poem (better known in the West under its English title, The Road to Life) based on the true stories of his pupils in the orphanage for street children, which he started in 1925 and published in 1933–1935. Before that, in 1932, Makarenko saw his first story being published, "The March of the 30th Year". In 1934 he became a member of the Soviet Union of Writers.

==== Brovary labour colony ====
In 1935 Makarenko started working at the NKVD in Kyiv as the Chief Assistant of the Labour Colony Department. In 1936 he was appointed the head of another colony, in Brovary, and according to the Patrice Lumumba Peoples' Friendship University of Russia "in less than a year turned an unruly bunch of pupils into a highly disciplined working collective."

==== In Moscow: flight, books ====
Accused of being critical towards Stalin and supporting the Ukrainian opposition, Makarenko had to flee Kyiv in order to avoid arrest and settled in Moscow. He continued writing, and in 1937 his acclaimed The Book for Parents came out, followed by Flags on the Battlements (translated into English as Learning to Live) in 1938, a sequel to The Road to Life. In February 1939 he received the Order of the Red Banner of Labour, a high-profile Soviet award.

=== Death ===
On April 1, 1939, Anton Semenovich Makarenko died of heart failure in a suburban train at the Golitsyno railway station of the Moscow Railway's Smolensk line, aged 51. He was buried in Moscow, at the Novodevichy Cemetery.

== Legacy ==
Although there was some opposition by the authorities at the early stages of Makarenko's "experiments", the Soviet establishment eventually came to hail his colonies as a grand success in communist education and rehabilitation. Among his key ideas were "as much exigence towards the person as possible and as much respect for him as possible", the use of positive peer pressure on the individual by the collective, and institutionalized self-government and self-management of that collective.

Makarenko was one of the first Soviet educators to urge that the activities of various educational institutions — i.e., the school, the family, clubs, public organizations, production collectives and the community existing at the place of residence — should be integrated.

The Ukrainian law "On the Condemnation and Prohibition of Propaganda of Russian Imperial Policy in Ukraine and the Decolonization of Toponymy prohibits "the glorification in public space of persons who were employees of Soviet state security bodies of all levels." Hence in June 2024 an advisory commission of the Ukrainian Institute of National Memory concluded that it was forbidden to "further use of the name of Anton Makarenko in the names of geographical objects, legal entities, objects of property rights, presence in public space of monuments and memorial signs erected in his honor since that is propaganda of Russian imperial policy. The commission emphasized that these restrictions would not apply to the research of Makarenko's activities and its "storage, purchase/sale, reading of editions of his works, exhibiting objects and documents related to the teacher in museums, etc."

== Criticism and response ==
Criticism of Makarenko's ideas were raised by Soviet educators and Russian dissidents both before and after the fall of Soviet communism. The humanist educator Vasyl Sukhomlynsky ventured in an unpublished manuscript, "Our Good Family" (1967), against "Makarenko's false statement that the main objective of Soviet moral and character education is found in the collective." Vladimir Sirotin (Kharkiv 1966 - Moscow 2016) described Makarenko as "the bard of punitive pedagogy" and as an ideologue of "command pedagogy", a system attempting to suppress the personality and being contrary to democratic freedoms and human rights, including the natural rights of child and parents. Makarenko's system has been faulted for giving the child collective too much power over the individual child.

This critique is not shared by some Western analysts of Makarenko's pedagogic system, who regard him as keeping a good balance between the individual personality and the welcome influence of the guided collective, seen as a link in integrating the individual into the wider society. The Makarenko system has been studied, among others, by Scandinavian care workers dealing with young drug abusers who couldn't be helped efficiently by using other approaches. There are also similarities between Makarenko's pedagogy and the work of authors currently writing on the concept of group work. Makarenko's holistic view makes him a pioneer in this regard, holding the enlightened, but often ignored position that the individual is a complex being, with a multitude of potentials and needs. Some controversial statements from later works are seen as either authentic, the result of political pressure, or outright falsifications of his writings in a time when his work became canonised by the Soviet education system.

== Selected bibliography ==
Makarenko chess, a chess variant developed by him during the 1920s.

- Major (Мажор, 1932; play)
- March of the 30th Year (Марш 30-го года, 1932, novella)
- FD—1 (novella, subtitled "A sketch"; written in 1932, published posthumously)
- The Pedagogical Poem (Педагогическая поэма, 1925–1935, three-part novel)
- The Book for Parents (Книга для родителей, 1937; non-fiction)
- Honour (Честь, 1937—1938; novella)
- Flags on the Battlements (Флаги на башнях, 1938)

== See also ==
- Orphans in the Soviet Union
- Krantz, Helga I. Reeducation of Juvenile Delinquents. Albuquerque, NM. Century University. 1993.
