= Commandos (oppositionist group) =

The Commandos (Polish: Komandosi) was a name used for a group of left-wing Polish students in the late 1960s and early 1970s. The group included prominent dissident students such as Seweryn Blumsztajn, Teresa Bogucka, Jan T. Gross, Irena Grudzińska, Irena Lasota, Jan Lityński, Adam Michnik, Henryk Szlajfer, Barbara Toruńczyk, and more. Also, as time passed, some young academic instructors were included, for example Jakub Karpiński, Jadwiga Staniszkis, and Andrzej Zabłudowski.

The group came into existence at a time when the somewhat older dissidents, Jacek Kuroń and Karol Modzelewski were in prison following their notorious Open Letter. Following their release, they once again became something of guides for the rebellious students, and the two were considered Commandos too (in a somewhat wider sense).

The name was popular due to the way in which the students interfered and came to control classroom discussions at University of Warsaw on topics which were politically charged from the point of view of standard communist propaganda of the era. The name was introduced however by an academic instructor who actively opposed the dissident students (as explained in court by Blumsztajn during a post-March 68 trial of himself and Lityński) — ironically, the name was meant to sound derogatory.

During the March '68 events many members of the group were arrested and tried on trumped up charges by the communist authorities. Michnik was sentenced to three years in prison, Kuroń three and a half, Lityński to two and a half, Blumsztajn to two.

== See also ==
- Banana youth
