= Irena Lasota =

Polish Philosopher

- Born: Irene Hirszowicz; 25 July 1945 (age 81)
- Education: Columbia University
- Organization: Institute for Democracy in Eastern Europe
- Honours: Commander's Cross of the Order of Polonia Restituta
- Website: idee-us.org

Irena Lasota (born 25 July 1945 as Irene Hirszowicz) is a Polish philosopher, publicist, publisher, social and political activist, and president/co-director of the Institute for Democracy in Eastern Europe. As a so-called banana youth, Lasota began her political activism as a student in Poland during the 1968 political crisis, which pitted protesting students against the then-Communist government. Soon after the March events, Lasota would emigrate to the United States, eventually returning to Europe in the first half of the 1980s to settle down in France. Lasota is to this day a frequent commentator on Polish and American political affairs, and remains an outspoken supporter of freedom of speech and democratic institutions.

== Early life ==
Born in France shortly after the conclusion of World War II in Europe, Lasota would return to Poland with her family in 1948 where they changed their family name from Hirszowicz to Lasota. In 1958 she became a member of the "Hufiec Walterowski" (Eng. The Walter Troop), a youth organization re-activated in 1956 under the mantle of the Polish Scouting and Guiding Association following the period of Stalinism in Eastern Europe. The Troop was led at the time by Jacek Kuroń, and would produce many other leaders of the democratic opposition in Communist Poland, including Andrzej Seweryn and Adam Michnik.

== Political activism ==
=== Activism in Poland ===
Between 1962 and 1968 Lasota studied philosophy at the University of Warsaw. In 1964 she created a discussion group in cooperation with other students, among whom were Teresa Bogucka, Maciej Czechowski, Józef Dajczgewand, and Wiktor Górecki. The group's members also practised self-education in the area of social sciences, sharing a copy of the Parisian magazine Kultura, organizing an emergency fund in case of government reprisals, and took part in open meetings of the Socialist Youth Association (ZMS), of which Lasota was a member for three months in 1964.

Lasota's group would ideologically distance itself from another active student group headed by former Walter Troop member Adam Michnik. Kuroń later commented on this cooling of relations: "In accordance with the rules presented to them by Irena, they aimed at attracting youth living in the student dorms, youth from rural areas, those with a worker and peasant background. […] They accused Adam [Michnik] and his colleagues of elitism, of closing themselves off in their own circle, or lounge as they called it" (Wiara i wina, NOWA, Warsaw, 1990).

Between 1966 and 1967 Lasota prepared for a role as debate leader at the open-entry ZMS meetings. During this time she became acquainted with Antoni Zambrowski and began aiding him in the distribution of transcribed illegal publications, i.e. translating banned political science writings. In 1987 and the following year, she would begin co-editing and disseminating pamphlets around the University of Warsaw and work as editorial assistant for the publication "Wiedza Powszechna".

In January 1968 Lasota was party to the culminating events eventually leading to the March crisis and wave of student protests in Poland. On January 30, 1968, a student demonstration took place in Warsaw against the censuring and removal of the play Dziady from the National Theatre. Directed by Kazimierz Dejmek, the play had run for four nights before Dejmek was ordered that the show be limited to playing once a week, normal ticket sales for students capped at 100 seats, and the public's reaction noted down by the director. Though subject to confiscations and controls by Security Services and student members of Warsaw University's ZMS, Lasota was able to compile a petition of 3145 signatures sent by mail to the Marshal of the Sejm on February 16. During a pre-planned rally on March 8, she called for the return of Michnik and Henryk Szlajfer, both of whom had been expelled from the university, as well as for a halt to all other disciplinary action against Warsaw's students.

Having presented their demands, Lasota met with the deputy rector of the university as part of a student delegation. Following the rally Lasota was arrested and tried by the misdemeanour board, receiving a two-month prison sentence on the grounds of "standing on a public bench in muddied boots". She was released in August 1968, but faced further prosecution the following year. In April 1969 she was tried and sentenced once again, this time for a year and a half for belonging to a secret organization. Over this same period Lasota, in cooperation with Jakub Karpiński, Grażyna Kuroniowa, Andrzej Zabłudowski, collected information to be sent abroad concerning the ongoing legal proceedings of individuals prosecuted for their involvement in the March events.

=== Activism and life abroad ===
In 1970 Lasota left Poland with her then-husband Zabłudowski, following his expulsion from the University of Warsaw. Under the pretext of emigration to Israel, the couple transited and officially emigrated to the United States that same year. Lasota resumed her studies, graduating from Temple University in Philadelphia in 1972 with a degree in special education. She would work as a child therapist for the next nine years until 1982. In 1975 she returned to school, this time completing a degree in political sciences with a specialization in International Communism at Columbia University in 1979. This led her to become a lecturer in this field at Fordham and Yale universities between 1980-81.

Lasota remained politically active around events unfolding in Poland over this same period. Though banned from entering the country, she was able to obtain a visa and return to Poland on four occasions, in 1975, 1977, 1979, and 1984, bringing with her and disseminating illegal publications among her friends. She worked to promote awareness of events in Poland by providing western mass media outlets with current information. She wrote for The New Daily in New York and cooperated with London's Aneks. In 1975 Lasota became a publicist and permanent collaborator with Radio Free Europe and the BBC. From 1976 she was also in contact with US labour organization AFL-CIO, which she provided with information on the prosecution of workers in Poland as a primary consultant to its directorial board. In 1977 Lasota took part in an appeal by American intellectuals in defence of arrested members of the Polish Workers' Protection Committee. That same year, she would co-found Amnesty International's coordination group for Eastern European alongside Robert Sharlet and Irena Grudzińska.

By 1981, Lasota had become an editor and publisher of numerous publications, including Committee in Support of Solidarity Reports, Solidarity Bulletin, and Uncaptive Mind. Additionally, she wrote articles that appeared on the pages of Poland's underground newspapers. That same year in New York, Lasota, in cooperation with Eric Chenoweth, Karpiński, and Jerzy Warman, founded The Committee in Support of Solidarity. The Committee was active politically, organizing demonstrations, among others, at the United Nations' New York headquarters in 1982. During a session dedicated to the topic of disarmament, Lasota and Chenoweth managed to unfurl a banner they had smuggled into the building in front of Andrei Gromyko, Soviet Delegation Chief, which read "Disarm Brezhnev, disarm Jaruzelski", for which they were detained by building security. Through its money collection efforts, the Committee was able to procure various materials and equipment for freedom organizations in Poland. This included tape recorders, transistors, printing ink, silkscreens, all of which were smuggled with the help of hundreds of opposition activists travelling between Poland and the United States and France. One example of the organization's money collection efforts was a concert of violinist Wanda Wiłkomirska organized in New York, which brought in $8300 for the Polish opposition.

By 1984, The Committee expanded to become the Institute for Democracy in Eastern Europe (IDEE). The organization broadened its activities to material support for anti-Communist opposition movements in Czechoslovakia and Hungary, in addition to Poland. It also served as a collection and transfer point for donations from American foundations supporting independent initiatives in these countries. By November 1989, at least 194 periodicals and underground initiatives received up to 143.760 US dollars in aid, transferred and billed under the names of various composers, artists, and poets. A full expense report was published by Lasota in "Kultura" (n4/1990). IDEE would also transfer over 250 thousand USD to the Consortium of Independent Publishers, along with additional sums for the Regional Executive Commission of NSZZ Solidarity Mazovia, underground Independent Student Collective, and Orange Alternative. In 1986 she oversaw a sum of 200 thousand USD provided by George Soros' Open Society foundation for short-term scholarships ranging between 500-1,000 dollars. The scholarships benefited 177 individuals who were able to undertake study trips to London and Paris, and were aimed at grooming Poland's future academic and political elite.

In 1985 Lasota moved to Paris. From there she continued to send thousands of books by mail to Poland with the help of her second husband, Jakub Karpiński. Together they published a Polish journal series titled Konfrontacje between 1985–91, which contained translated academic research on anti-Communist opposition efforts. The series comprised 14 tomes, frequently re-printed by independent Polish publishers, including PoMost and Res publica. Since the collapse of Communism in Eastern Europe after 1989, Lasota has focused on financial and organizational aid for independent initiatives in former Soviet Bloc states, opening the IDEE Foundation in Poland in 1992.

== Writings ==
=== Editor ===
- Bulletin Solidarność
- Biuletyn Informacyjny
- Listy więźniów
- Repression in Poland
- Various Helsinki Committee Poland studies
- Committee in Support of Solidarity Reports
- Konfrontacje
- Uncaptive Minds
- World Affairs
- Droga do Solidarności – selected texts of Marek Tarniewski and documents between 1956–81

=== Contributor ===
- New Daily
- Aneks
- Radio Free Europe
- The New York Times
- Kultura
- Orientacja na Prawo
- Tu, teraz
- Przegląd Wiadomości Agencyjnych
- Rzeczpospolita
- Salon24

== Awards and honours ==
- Commander's Cross of the Order of Polonia Restituta (2008)
- Honorary Member of the Republican Party of Georgia (1999)

== See also ==
- Anti-communist resistance in Poland
