= Charlie English (writer) =

British journalist

- Born: 1967 (age 58–59); York, North Yorkshire, England
- Citizenship: British
- Education: Pocklington School; Imperial College London; City, University of London
- Occupations: Writer journalist
- Years active: 1990–present
- Employer: The Guardian (former head of international news)
- Notable work: The Snow Tourist; The Book Smugglers of Timbuktu; The Gallery of Miracles and Madness; The CIA Book Club
- Spouse: Lucy Blincoe
- Awards: Fellow of the Royal Geographical Society
- Website: charlieenglish.net

Charlie English (born 1967) is a British writer and journalist. A former head of international news at The Guardian, he has written four critically acclaimed non-fiction books and is a Fellow of the Royal Geographical Society.

== Early life and education ==
Charlie English was born in 1967 in York and brought up in Beverley, East Yorkshire. His father was an orthopaedic surgeon and his mother a historian. He was educated at Pocklington School.

English studied electrical and electronic engineering at Imperial College London, where he contributed to the student newspaper, Felix, and later took a postgraduate qualification in journalism at City, University of London. In 1990, he ran a thousand kilometres of the Karakoram Highway, from Pakistan to China, to raise money for the development charity Intermediate Technology. He wrote accounts of this and other journeys for magazines and periodicals.

== Career ==
English began his journalism career in Peshawar, Pakistan, where he worked for the broadsheet newspaper The News International, in a bureau run by Rahimullah Yusufzai. He returned to London to study journalism at City University, later joining The Independent, where he worked from 1995 to 1997, and then The Guardian from 1997 to 2014. At The Guardian, he served as arts editor and head of international news.

== Writing ==
English's first book, The Snow Tourist (2008), is described as part eulogy, part history, part travelogue.The Guardian called it "a far more intriguing account than much current travel literature", while The Observer noted that "incredibly, what seems like the most vanishingly tiny subject actually turns out to encompass vast tracts of our experience."

After leaving The Guardian in 2014, English worked on a series of works of narrative non-fiction which addressed aspects of culture in wartime. The Book Smugglers of Timbuktu (US title: The Storied City), published in 2017, tells the story of a group of Timbuktu librarians who managed to evacuate large quantities of rare manuscripts from the desert city after it was occupied by Al-Qaeda-linked jihadists. Writing in The Guardian, historian William Dalrymple called it "an exemplary piece of investigative journalism … wonderfully colourful … narrative non-fiction at its most satisfying and engaging." Peter Thonemann, reviewing for the Times Literary Supplement, admired its "post-modern historiography of quite extraordinary sophistication and ingenuity". The Scotsman called the study "a fascinating book," applauding the author's decision to tell the story in a "split-time form" that sets the exploits of early explorers against the modern rescue, and noting that at its best the book "shows parallels and mirrorings" between the two quests. Dagmar Wolf, reviewing for the German-funded cultural magazine Qantara, wrote that the narrative "reads like an adventure novel" and "proves that the city has not lost its magic," while also crediting English with acknowledging doubts about the exact number of manuscripts saved. The book went on to be named a Financial Times "Book of the Year" and a Sunday Times "Must Read".

The Gallery of Miracles and Madness (2021) is a history of the Prinzhorn Collection of art made in German psychiatric institutions. It reveals how these works were used by Hitler and the Nazis to defame modernism in the so-called Degenerate art shows. The book received wide critical acclaim. In The Guardian, biographer Kathryn Hughes praised English's "deft" control of a sprawling story: "the result is a book as beautiful as it is bleak." The Times critic Gerard de Groot wrote that "there's so much that's wonderful about this book, it’s hard to know where to start heaping praise. It is by turns intriguing, tragic, horrifying and occasionally funny. I was sad when I finished it, a feeling I usually only get from novels." Kirkus Reviews called it "a revelatory look at the ‘gangplank for the Holocaust’." Publishers Weekly judged it "a fascinating account… English’s story feels strikingly relevant". In The Economist the narrative was praised as "engrossing". Writing in the Wall Street Journal, Diane Cole said English "deftly links art history, psychiatry and Hitler’s ideology to devastating effect," noting that she "often needed to pause for air." For Library Journal, Jacqueline Parascandola described it as "a moving account of art and mental illness in Nazi Germany… English’s accessible, inviting writing will draw in readers." Ella Fox-Martens in the Observer called it "elegant and exhaustively-researched… necessary reading in our current time."

The CIA Book Club (2025) is the first narrative account of a long-running US intelligence effort led by George C. Minden to smuggle ten million uncensored texts into the Eastern Bloc during the Cold War, focusing on Poland. The book details how the CIA's covert book distribution program intersected with the activities of independent Polish dissidents, including Teresa Bogucka and Mirosław Chojecki. Both were involved in underground publishing networks—such as Bogucka's "Flying Library" and Chojecki's NOWA press—that sometimes circulated books which had been introduced into Eastern Europe through Western channels.

Reviewing it in The Guardian, BBC World Affairs editor John Simpson wrote that it is "a finely written page-turner full of well-researched stories of smuggling, intrigue and survival", and wondered if he may have inadvertently taken part in the smuggling operations himself. The Financial Times judged it "a timely look at how CIA money helped Poland’s underground print banned books", noting its relevance to contemporary debates about information warfare. Ariane Bankes in The Tablet highlighted the book's portrait of Poland's samizdat culture and the moral courage of its dissidents. The Week selected it as a Book of the Week, echoing Luke Harding's description of the narrative as "entertaining and vivid" in the Observer. In The Sunday Times, the historian Dominic Sandbrook called it "gripping… a vivid and moving story". The Literary Review’s Piers Brendon, in an essay titled Freedom Readers, admired the way English "turns a covert operation into a tale of literary liberation."

== Personal life ==
Charlie English is married to the writer and journalist Lucy Blincoe. They live in London.
