= Janusz Bugajski =

American political consultant (1954–2025)

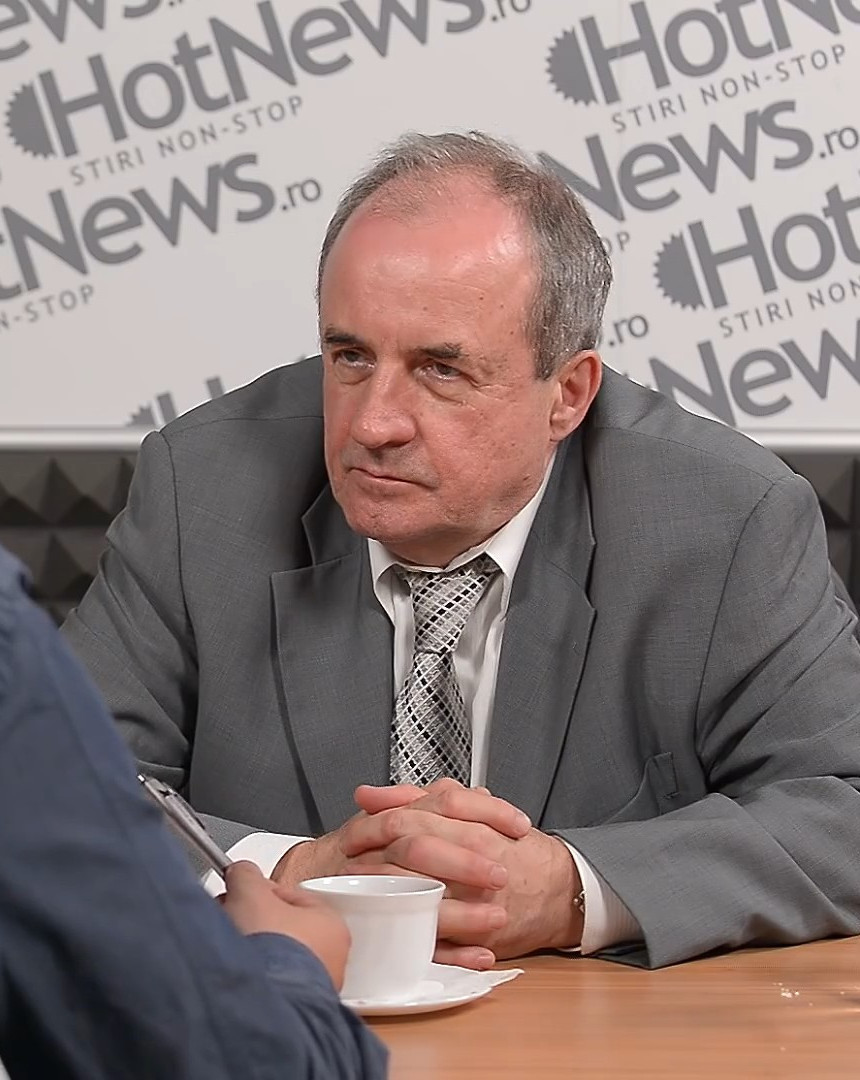
- Bugajski in 2016
- Born: 23 September 1954; Nantwich, Cheshire, England
- Died: 18 October 2025 (aged 71)
- Education: University of Kent at Canterbury, London School of Economics and Political Science
- Occupation: Political scientist

Janusz Bugajski (23 September 1954 – 18 October 2025) was a British-born American political consultant who was a senior fellow at the Jamestown Foundation in Washington, D.C. He also served as the host of the "Bugajski Hour" television shows broadcast in the Balkans. Previously, he held the position of senior fellow at the Center for European Policy Analysis (CEPA) in Washington, D.C., and served as the director of the New European Democracy Program at the Center for Strategic and International Studies (CSIS).

Bugajski served as a consultant on East European affairs for various U.S. organizations and government agencies, including the U.S. Agency for International Development (USAID), the United States Department of Defense, the International Republican Institute (IRI), the Free Trade Union Institute (AFL-CIO), the International Research and Exchanges Board (IREX), and BBC television in London.

He testified regularly before the U.S. Congress and also served as the chair of the South-Central Europe area studies program at the Foreign Service Institute of the U.S. Department of State.

== Life and career ==
Bugajski immigrated to the United States in 1986. He was the son of Piotr Bugajski, a teacher, and Jadwiga (Kawska) Bugajski. He was an American of Polish descent and was fluent in both English and Polish. In 1977, he earned a B.A. with Honours from the University of Kent at Canterbury in the United Kingdom, and in 1981, he obtained an M.Ph. in social anthropology from the London School of Economics and Political Science.

From 1981 to 1983, Bugajski worked as a consultant on Polish affairs for BBC Television in London. In 1984 to 1985, he served as a Senior Research Analyst at Radio Free Europe/Radio Liberty (RFE/RL) in Munich, Germany. In 1986, he joined the Center for Strategic and International Studies (CSIS) in Washington, D.C., where he established the center's East European department. Bugajski held the position of associate director from 1986 to 1993 and became the director in 1993 for East European Studies at the Center for Strategic and International Studies in Washington, D.C.

Bugajski was also an adjunct lecturer at the American University in 1991; lecturer at the Smithsonian Institution, the Foreign Service Institute, the Woodrow Wilson Center; consultant for the International Republican Institute, the International Research & Exchanges Board, and the Institute for Democracy in Eastern Europe. He died on 18 October 2025, at the age of 71.

== Awards ==
Bugajski was awarded grants (1988) of the Earhart Foundation, (1989) of the Lynde and Harry Bradley Foundation (1991) with the leadership award of the Center for Strategic and International Studies. In 1998 he received the Distinguished Public Service Award from the U.S. Department of State, the U.S. Agency for International Development (USAID), the U.S. Information Agency (USIA), and the Arms Control and Disarmament Agency in recognition of his contribution to international affairs.

He was awarded Medal of Gratitude by the Polish Free Trade Union Solidarity in 2010. He was a member of the American Association for the Advancement of Slavic Studies.

== Editorial work ==
He was a regular contributor to various U.S. and European newspapers and journals.

Bugajski's publications include "Ethnic Politics in Eastern Europe: A Guide to Nationality, Policies, Organizations, and Parties" (M.E. Sharpe, 1994) and his book "Nations in Turmoil: Conflict and Cooperation in Eastern Europe" (Westview, 1992 and 1995), which was selected by Choice as an outstanding academic book. He also reflected on the arousing tensions between Russia and the West and Russia's "neo-imperialism" at various regions of conflict as e.g. the lessons from the Russian-Georgian War in August 2008.

== Selected publications ==
A list of publications is published on the CSIS homepage

- Failed State: A Guide to Russia’s Rupture (Jamestown Foundation, 2022) ISBN 978-1-7352752-2-2;
- Eurasian Disunion: Russia's Vulnerable Flanks (Jamestown Foundation, 2016); ISBN 978-0-9855045-5-7
- Conflict Zones: North Caucasus and Western Balkans Compared (Jamestown Foundation, 2014); ISBN 978-0-9830842-9-7
- Return of the Balkans: Challenges to European Integration and U.S. Disengagement (Strategic Studies Institute, U.S. Army War College, 2013); ISBN 978-1-5848757-0-3
- Georgian Lessons: Conflicting Russian and Western Interests in the Wider Europe (CSIS Press, 2010); ISBN 978-0-8920660-6-3
- Dismantling the West: Russia's Atlantic Agenda (Potomac Books, 2009); ISBN 978-1-5979721-0-9
- America's New European Allies (Nova, 2009); ISBN 978-1-6069243-3-4
- Expanding Eurasia: Russia's European Ambitions (CSIS, 2008); ISBN 978-0-8920654-5-5
- Atlantic Bridges: America's New European Allies, with Ilona Teleki (Rowman & Littlefield, 2007); ISBN 978-0-7425491-1-1
- Cold Peace: Russia's New Imperialism (Praeger, 2004); ISBN 978-0-2759836-2-8
- Political Parties of Eastern Europe: A Guide to Politics in the Post-Communist Era (M.E. Sharpe, 2002); ISBN 978-1-5632467-6-0
- Ethnic Politics in Eastern Europe: A Guide to Nationality Policies, Organizations, and Parties (M.E. Sharpe, 1994); ISBN 978-1-5632428-2-3
- Nations in Turmoil: Conflict and Cooperation in Eastern Europe (Westview, 1993, 1995); ISBN 978-0-8133162-6-0
- Fourth World Conflicts: Communism and Rural Societies (Westview, 1991); ISBN 978-0-8133807-2-8
- Sandinista Communism and Rural Nicaragua (Praeger/CSIS, 1990); ISBN 978-0-2759353-5-1
- East European Fault Lines: Dissent, Opposition, and Social Activism (Westview Press, 1989); ISBN 978-0-8133771-4-8
- Czechoslovakia: Charter 77's Decade of Dissent (Praeger/CSIS, 1987); ISBN 978-0-2759276-9-1

A list of publications on the CEPA website

- Mind the Gap (April 10, 2020);
- Vulnerable Europe (March 4, 2020);
- Is Bosnia a Time Bomb? (January 6, 2020).
