= Stefan Staszewski =

Polish politician

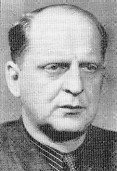

First Secretary of the Warsaw Committee of the PZPR
- In office September 1955 – February 1957
- Preceded by: Stanisław Pawlak
- Succeeded by: Witold Jarosiński

Personal details
- Born: 13 November 1906 Warsaw, Congress Poland, Russian Empire
- Died: 2 November 1989 (aged 82) Warsaw, Polish People's Republic
- Resting place: Powązki Cemetery, Warsaw
- Party: Polish United Workers' Party
- Awards: Silver Cross of Merit

Stefan Staszewski, born Gustaw Szusterman also known as Gustaw Szuster (13 November 1906 – 2 November 1989), was a Polish communist politician of Jewish origin who was born and died in Warsaw. An activist in the communist movement from the age of fourteen, he was in the Secretariat of the Central Committee of the Communist Party of Poland in 1930–1932. His arrests in Poland were followed by extended stays in the Soviet Union. He graduated from and after 1934 became an instructor at the International Lenin School in Moscow. At the time of the Great Purge, Staszewski was arrested by the NKVD and in 1938 sentenced to eight years in Kolyma. On his release in 1945, he returned to Poland.

During the reign of Stalinism in the Polish People's Republic, Staszewski was in charge of propaganda, education and culture in the Katowice Voivodeship organization of the Polish Workers' Party. After holding further positions in official press and in the party central press departments, Staszewski became deputy minister of agriculture in January 1954. He was appointed regional first secretary of the Polish United Workers' Party Warsaw committee in September 1955. He resigned from the first secretary position in February 1957 and became president of the Polish Press Agency, a post he held until the summer of 1958. Staszewski supported Władysław Gomułka during the Polish October of 1956. However, Staszewski was becoming increasingly independent and critical of Gomułka's rule; he was removed from power and during the 1968 Polish political crisis expelled from the party. In the 1970s and 1980s, he was a supporter of the Polish democratic opposition.
