= Adam Michnik =

Polish historian and intellectual

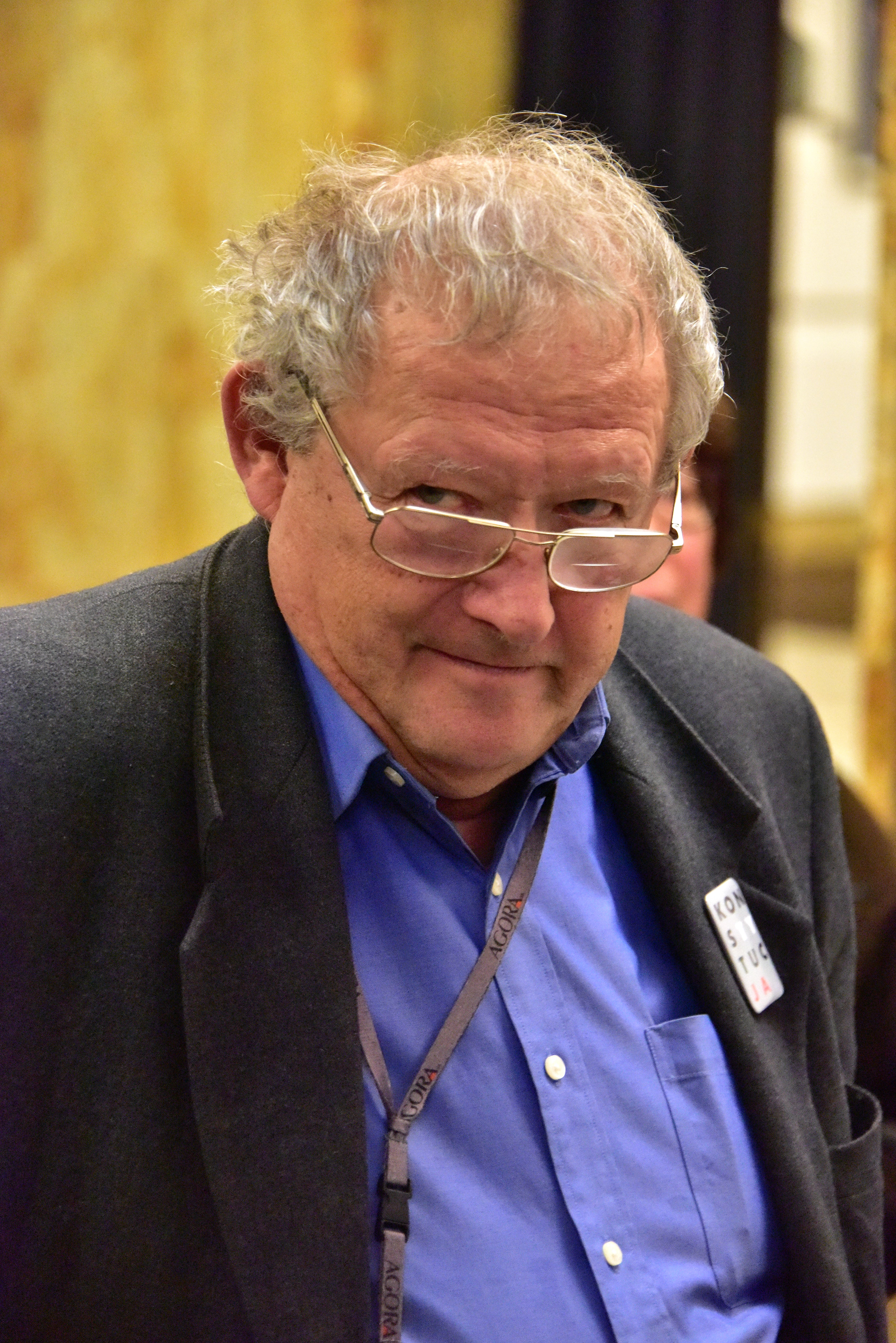
- Michnik in 2018
- Born: 17 October 1946 (age 80); Warsaw, Poland
- Education: Adam Mickiewicz University (M.A., 1975)
- Occupations: Journalist; historian; essayist; former dissident
- Movement: Banana youth
- Children: 1
- Awards: List: Robert F. Kennedy Human Rights Award 1986; Erasmus Prize 2001; Legion of Honour 2003; Dan David Prize 2006; Order of the White Eagle 2010; Goethe Medal 2011; Princess of Asturias Award 2022

Adam Michnik (Polish: [ˈadam ˈmixɲik]; born 17 October 1946) is a Polish historian, essayist, former dissident, public intellectual, as well as co-founder and editor-in-chief of the Polish newspaper Gazeta Wyborcza.

Reared in a family of committed communists, Michnik became an opponent of Poland's communist regime at the time of the party's anti-Jewish purges of 1968. He was imprisoned after the 1968 March Events and again after the imposition of martial law in 1981. He has been called "one of Poland's most famous political prisoners".

Michnik played a crucial role during the Polish Round Table Talks, as a result of which the communists agreed to call elections in 1989, which were won by Solidarity. Though he has withdrawn from active politics, he has "maintained an influential voice through journalism". He has received many awards and honors, including the Legion of Honour and European of the Year. He is also one of the 25 leading figures on the Information and Democracy Commission launched by Reporters Without Borders. In 2022, he received the Princess of Asturias Award in the category "Communication and Humanities".

== Family ==
Adam Michnik was born in Warsaw, Poland, to a family of communist activists of Jewish origin. His father Ozjasz Szechter was First Secretary of the Communist Party of Western Ukraine, and his mother Helena Michnik was a historian, communist activist, and children's-book author. His step-brother on his mother's side, Stefan Michnik, was a military judge in the 1950s, who passed sentences, including executions, in politically motivated trials of members of Polish anti-Nazi resistance fighters. Stefan Michnik (who lived in Sweden from 1968 until his death in 2021), was later formally accused of zbrodnie komunistyczne ("communist crimes") by the Polish Institute of National Remembrance.

A step-brother of Michnik on his father's side, Jerzy Michnik (born 1929), settled in Israel after 1957 and then moved to New York.

== Education ==
While attending primary school, Michnik was an active member of the Polish Scouting Association (ZHP), in a troop which was led by Jacek Kuroń. During secondary school, this particular Scouting troop was banned, and Adam began to participate in meetings of the Crooked Circle Club. After its closing in 1962, with the encouragement from Jan Józef Lipski and under Adam Schaff's protection, he founded a discussion group, "Contradiction Hunters Club" (Klub Poszukiwaczy Sprzeczności); he was one and the most visible leader of the left wing student opposition group, the Komandosi.

In 1964, he began to study history at Warsaw University. A year later he was suspended because he disseminated an open letter to the members of Polish United Workers' Party (PZPR) among his schoolmates. Its authors, Jacek Kuroń and Karol Modzelewski appealed for a beginning of reforms which would repair the political system in Poland. In 1965, the PZPR forbade the printing of his works. In 1966, he was suspended for the second time for organizing a discussion meeting with Leszek Kołakowski, who was expelled from the PZPR several weeks earlier, for criticizing its leaders. From then on, he wrote under a pseudonym to several newspapers including "Życie Gospodarcze", "Więź", and "Literatura".

In March 1968, he was expelled from the university for his activities during 1968 Polish political crisis. The crisis was ignited by the ban of Kazimierz Dejmek's adaptation of Adam Mickiewicz's poetic drama Dziady ("Forefathers' Eve") in the National Theatre. The play contained many anti-Russian allusions, which were greeted with enthusiastic applause by the audience. Michnik and another student, Henryk Szlajfer, recounted the situation to a correspondent of Le Monde, "whose report was then carried on Radio Free Europe". Both Michnik and Szlajfer were expelled from the university. Upon their expulsion, students organized demonstrations, which were brutally suppressed by the riot police and "worker-squads".

Władysław Gomułka used Michnik's and several other dissidents' Jewish background to wage an antisemitic campaign, blaming the Jews for the crisis. Michnik was arrested and sentenced to three years imprisonment for "acts of hooliganism".

In 1969, he was released from prison under an amnesty, but he was forbidden to continue his studies. Not until the middle of the 1970s was he allowed to continue his studies of history, which he finished in 1975 at the Adam Mickiewicz University in Poznań, under the supervision of Lech Trzeciakowski.

== Opposition ==
After Michnik was released from prison, he worked for two years as a welder at the Róża Luxemburg's (Rosa Luxemburg) Industrial Plant and then, on the recommendation of Jacek Kuroń, he became private secretary to Antoni Słonimski.

In 1976–1977 he lived in Paris. After he returned to Poland, he became involved in the activity of Workers' Defence Committee (KOR), which had already existed for a couple of months. It was one of the best known opposition organizations of the 1970s in Poland and the Eastern Bloc generally. He became one of the most active opposition activists and also one of the supporters of the Society for Educational Courses (Towarzystwo Kursów Naukowych).

Between 1977 and 1989, he was the editor or co-editor of underground newspapers published illegally, samizdat: Biuletyn Informacyjny, Zapis, and Krytyka. He was also a member of the management of one of the biggest underground publishers: NOWa.

In years 1980–1989, he was an adviser to both the Independent Self-governing trade union "Solidarity" (NSZZ "Solidarność") in the Mazovia Region and to Foundry Workers Committee of "Solidarity".

When General Wojciech Jaruzelski declared martial law in December 1981, he was an internee at first, but when he refused to sign a "loyalty oath" and assent to voluntarily leave the country, he was jailed and accused of an "attempt to overthrow socialism". He was in jail without a verdict until 1984 because the prosecutor's office deliberately prolonged the trial.

Michnik demanded an end to the judicial proceedings against him or have his case dismissed. Meanwhile, he wanted to be granted the status of a political prisoner and began a hunger strike while in jail. In 1984, he was released from jail, under an amnesty.

He took part in an attempt to organize a strike in the Gdańsk shipyard. As a consequence, he was rearrested in 1985 and this time sentenced to three years imprisonment. He was released the following year, again under another amnesty.

== Since 1989 ==
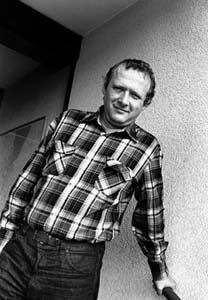
Michnik in 1991

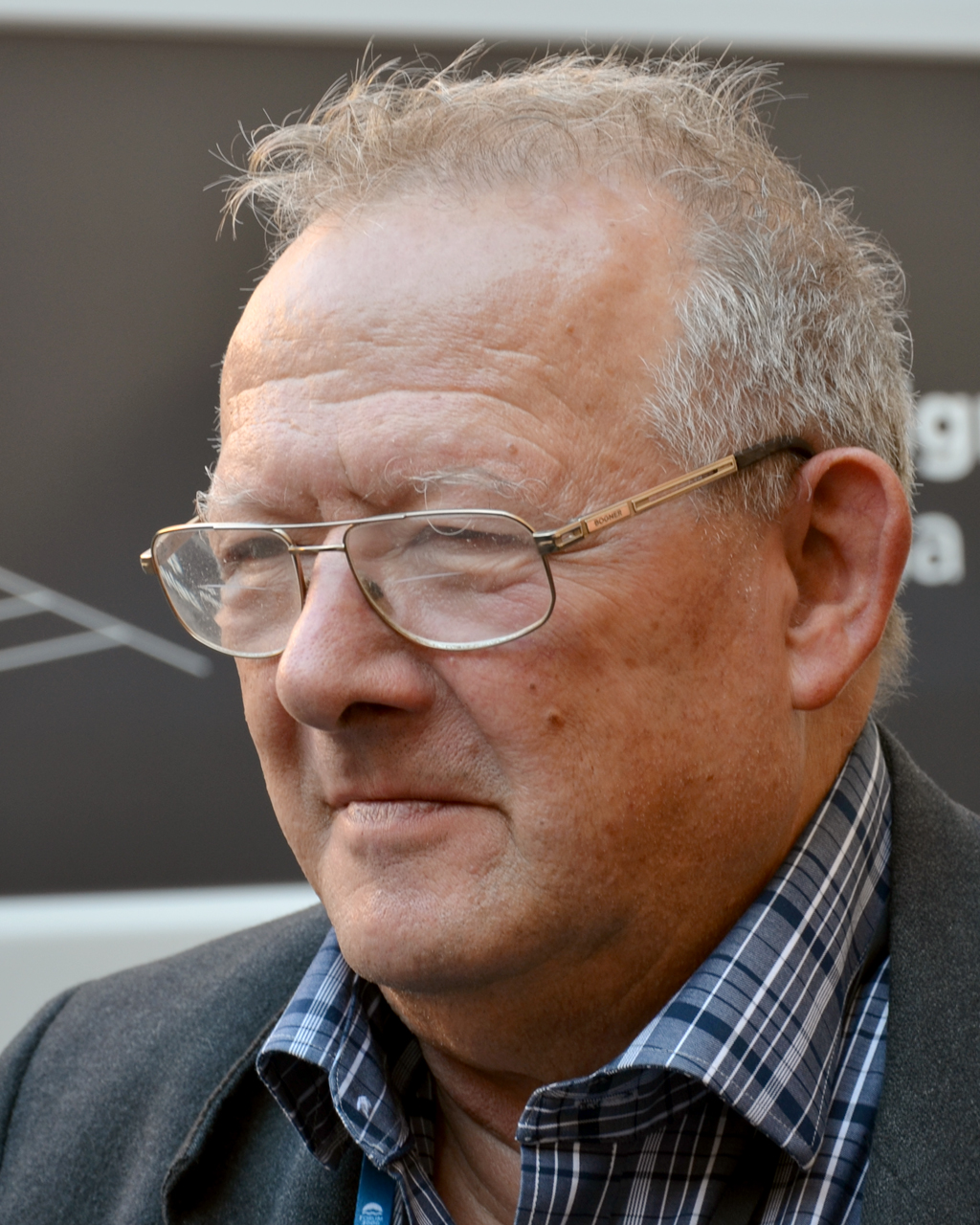
Michnik in 2018

In 1988, Michnik became an adviser of Lech Wałęsa's informal Coordination Committee, and later he became a member of the Solidarity Citizens' Committee. He took an active part in planning and preliminary negotiations for the Round Table Talks in 1989, in which he also participated. Michnik inspired and collaborated with the editors of the Ulam Quarterly, before 1989 that journal pioneered the World Wide Web in the USA.

After the Round Table Talks, Lech Wałęsa told him to organize a big Polish national daily, which was supposed to be an 'organ' of the Solidarity Citizens' Committee, before the upcoming elections. This newspaper, under the Round Table agreement, was Gazeta Wyborcza ("Election Newspaper") because it was supposed to appear until the end of the parliamentary election in 1989. After organizing this newspaper with journalists who worked in the "Biuletyn Informacyjny", Adam Michnik became its editor-in-chief.

In the elections to the Contract Sejm on 4 June 1989 he became a member of parliament for Lech Wałęsa's Solidarity Citizens' Committee electoral register, as a candidate for the city of Bytom.

Both as a member of parliament and as editor of Gazeta Wyborcza he actively supported Prime Minister Tadeusz Mazowiecki's government and his candidature in the 1990 presidential election campaign against Lech Wałęsa. After the breakup of the Citizens' Committee and Mazowiecki's failure, Michnik withdrew from his direct involvement in politics and did not run for a seat in the 1991 parliamentary election, instead focusing on editorial and journalistic activities. Under his leadership, Gazeta Wyborcza was converted into an influential liberal daily newspaper in Poland. Based on Gazeta Wyborcza assets, the Agora SA partnership came into existence. By May 2004, it was one of the biggest media concerns in Poland, administrating 11 monthly titles, the portal gazeta.pl, the outdoor advertising company AMS, and has shares in several radio stations. Michnik does not have any shares in Agora and does not hold any office, other than chief editor, which is unusual in business in Poland. Michnik's shares are kept by Agora.

Prime Minister Tadeusz Mazowiecki in his exposé in September 1989 began a new, so-called "thick line"attitude to the political history of the recent past. Michnik is a proponent and advocate of this policy.

On 27 December 2002, Michnik and Paweł Smoleński revealed the so-called "Rywin affair" which had to be explained by a specially called parliamentary select committee.

In autumn 2004, due to health problems (he suffered from tuberculosis) he resigned from active participation in editing Gazeta Wyborcza and passed his duties to editorial colleague Helena Łuczywo.

He is a member of the Association of Polish Writers and the Council on Foreign Relations.

Since the conservative Law and Justice party led by Jarosław Kaczyński gained power in Poland in 2015, Michnik has been a vocal critic of the new government accusing it of undermining democracy in the country stating that "What we are seeing today is a gradual closing down of democracy. There is no other democracy than the liberal version. Everything else is a contradiction in terms."

In 2024, he became an expert at the "European Center for Analysis and Strategies" (CASE).^{[45]}

== Quotations ==
According to Canadian translator and writer Paul Wilson, Michnik "[holds a] core... belief... that history is not just about the past because it is constantly recurring, and not as farce, as Marx had it, but as itself:

The world is full of inquisitors and heretics, liars and those lied to, terrorists and the terrorized. There is still someone dying at Thermopylae, someone drinking a glass of hemlock, someone crossing the Rubicon, someone drawing up a proscription list."

Brutal and cruel colonialism is not the only, or the determining, aspect of English, French, and Dutch identity, even though the colonial era profoundly influenced these cultures. Likewise, Russia is not doomed to despotism at home and aggression abroad. It is no sphinx—it is a country full of conflicts and debates.

== Recognition ==
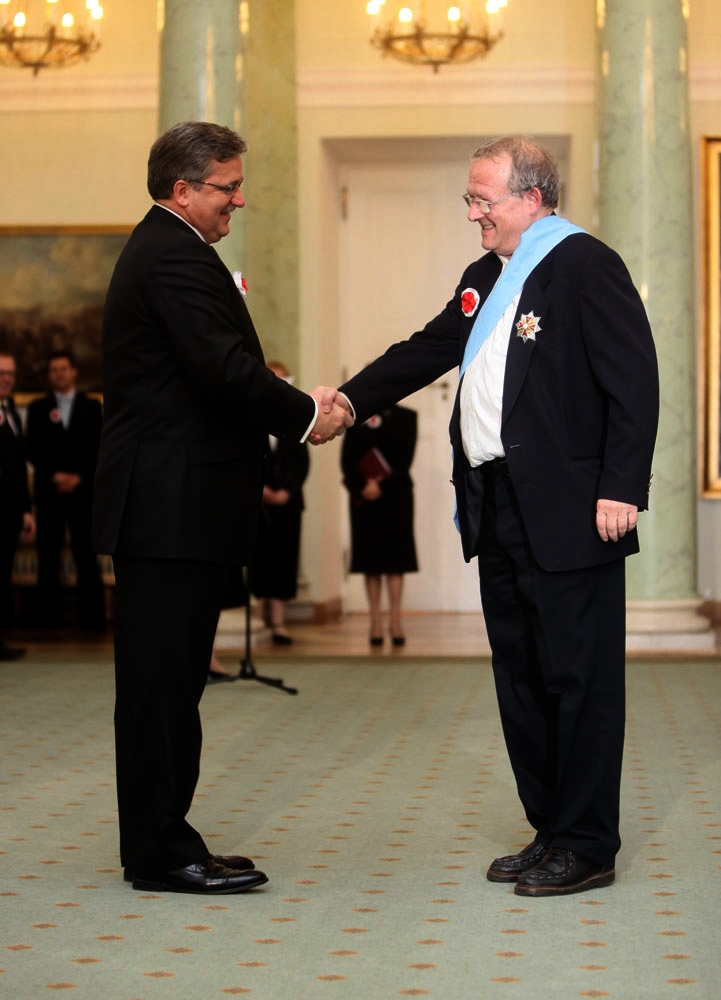
Michnik receiving Poland's highest decoration, the Order of the White Eagle, from President Bronisław Komorowski in 2010

- Polcul Foundation Award (Australia, 1980)
- Andrzej Kijowski Prize (Poland, 1985)
- Robert F. Kennedy Human Rights Award (United States, 1986)
- Prize winner of Prix de la Liberte of the French PEN-Club (France, 1988)
- Europe's Man of the Year – prize awarded by the magazine La Vie (France, 1989)
- Shofar Award – prize awarded by National Jewish Committee on Scouting (Israel, 1991)
- Francisco Cerecedo Award, by the Association of European Journalists (1999)
- Imre Nagy's Medal (Hungary, 1995)
- Organization for Security and Co-operation in Europe Prize for Democracy and Journalism (May 1996)
- Order of Bernardo O'Higgins (Chile, 1998)
- One of 50 World Press Freedom Heroes of the International Press Institute
- Grand Cross of the Order of Merit of the Federal Republic of Germany (Germany, 2001)
- Erasmus Prize (Netherlands, 2001)
- PhD Honoris Causa in New School for Social Research, University of Minnesota, Connecticut College, University of Michigan
- Chevalier of the Legion of Honor (France, 2003)
- Order of Tomáš Garrigue Masaryk 3rd Class (Czech Republic, 2003)
- Gold Medal for Merit to Culture – Gloria Artis (Poland, 2005)
- Listed by Financial Times as one of the 20 most influential journalists in the world.
- Professor of the National University of Kyiv-Mohyla Academy (Ukraine, 2006)
- Order of Prince Yaroslav the Wise 3rd class (Ukraine, 2006)
- Dan David Prize (Israel, 2006)
- Jan Karski Eagle Award (Poland, 2006)
- Cena Pelikán (Czech Republic, 2007)
- Patron of the Media Legal Defence Initiative
- PhD Honoris Causa Charles University, Prague (Czech Republic)
- Recipient of the Hanno R. Ellenbogen Citizenship Award (Czech Republic, 2010)
- Order of the White Eagle (Poland, 2010)
- Goethe Medal (Germany, 2011)
- PhD Honoris Causa Klaipėda University, Klaipėda (Lithuania, 2012)
- Kisiel Prize (Poland, 2013)
- Freedom Prize of the Lithuanian Parliament (Lithuania, 2014)
- Order of the Cross of Terra Mariana 3rd Class (Estonia, 2014)
- Alumno Bene Merenti Medal presented by the Adam Mickiewicz University in Poznań (Poland, 2016)
- Ortega y Gasset Award presented by El País daily (Spain, 2016)
- Primo Levi Prize presented by the Primo Levi Center in Genoa (Italy, 2018)
- Princess of Asturias Award in the category "Communication and Humanities" (Spain, 2022)
- Order of the White Double Cross, 2nd class, Grand Officer (Slovakia, 2024)

== Work ==
=== Books ===
- In Search of Lost Meaning: The New Eastern Europe , translated by Roman S. Czarny, editor Irena Grudzinska Gross, 2011. (ISBN 9780520269231)
- Letters from Freedom: Post-Cold War Realities and Perspectives, translated by Jane Cave, 1998. (ISBN 0-520-21759-4)
- Church and the Left, (David Ost, editor), 1992. (ISBN 0-226-52424-8)
- Letters from Prison and Other Essays, translated by Maya Latynski, 1986. (ISBN 0-520-05371-0)

=== Journalism ===
- What was the nationality of the stuffed teddy bear the reaction of Adam Michnik to the accusations towards Andrzej Wajda's Katyn in the French Le Monde, April 2008, originally published in Gazeta Wyborcza, English translation by * salon.eu.sk
- A Miracle a column about Czechoslovakia, published as a part of the * Czechoslovakian dossier, a special project of the Czechoslovak Bridges Association and * salon.eu.sk
- After the Velvet, an Existential Revolution? a dialogue between Adam Michnik and Václav Havel, English, originally published in Gazeta Wyborcza, November 2008
- "The Polish Witch-Hunt" The New York Review of Books 54/11 (28 June 2007) : 25–26

=== Articles ===
- "An Open Letter to International Public Opinion". Telos 54 (Winter 1982–83). New York: Telos Press.

== See also ==
- History of Solidarity
- List of Poles
