= Jacek Bylica =

Polish diplomat

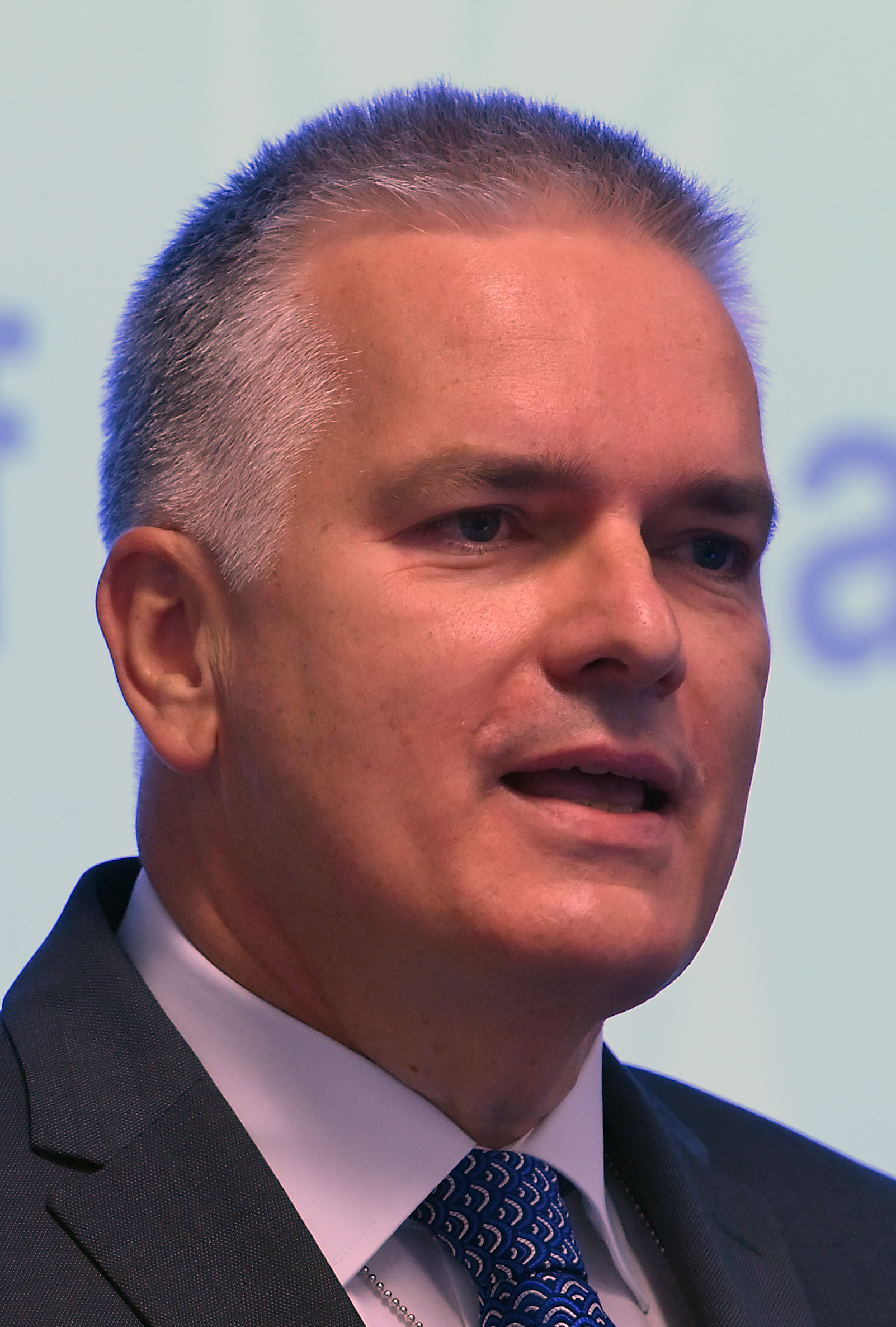
- Jacek Bylica (2021)

Poland Ambassador to the United Nations and OSCE in Vienna
- In office 2004 – 31 December 2007
- Preceded by: Henryk Szlajfer
- Succeeded by: Przemysław Grudziński

Personal details
- Born: 23 November 1963 (age 62) Warsaw, Poland
- Spouse: Małgorzata Kosmalska-Bylica
- Children: 2
- Education: Moscow State Institute of International Relations; Tufts University
- Profession: Diplomat

Jacek Andrzej Bylica (born 23 November 1963 in Warsaw) is a Polish and European Union diplomat; ambassador-head of the Polish Permanent Representation to the OSCE, IAEA and other international organizations in Vienna (2004–2007).

== Biography ==
Bylica graduated from the International Relations at the Moscow State Institute of International Relations. He hold also master's degree in Law and Diplomacy at the Fletcher School of Law and Diplomacy, Tufts University. He has been educated at the Polish Institute of International Affairs as well.

In 1988, he began his professional career at the Ministry of Foreign Affairs. Between 1990 and 1995 he was posted at the Embassy in Beijing, promoting from Third to Second and First Secretary. At the Ministry in Warsaw he was holding positions of: Korea Desk Officer; China Desk Officer; Head at the Arms Control and Disarmament Division; deputy director and Director of the Department of Asia, Australia and Latin America (1999–2001); Director of the Secretariat of the Minister (2002–2003); deputy director and Director of the Department of Security Policy (2003–2004). From 2004 to 2007 he was serving as an Ambassador, Permanent Representative to the Organization for Security and Co-operation in Europe (OSCE), the United Nations Office on Drugs and Crime (UNODC), the International Atomic Energy Agency (IAEA), the Comprehensive Nuclear-Test-Ban Treaty Organization (CTBTO), the Nuclear Suppliers Group (NSG), the Wassenaar Arrangement (WA) and other international organizations in Vienna. Next, from 2008 to 2013, he was the Head of NATO Weapons of Mass Destruction Non-proliferation Centre (WMDC) in Brussels. He was responsible, among others, for co-chairing NATO-Russia Council's Working Group on Arms Control, Disarmament and Non-proliferation. In 2012, he joined the European External Action Service and was appointed the Principal Adviser and Special Envoy for Non-proliferation and Disarmament. He ended his term in September 2020. Afterwards, he held the position of the Chief of Cabinet for the Director General of IAEA.

Besides Polish, Bylica speaks English, Chinese, Russian and has working knowledge of French. He is married to Małgorzata Kosmalska-Bylica, with two children.
