= Aleksander Smolar =

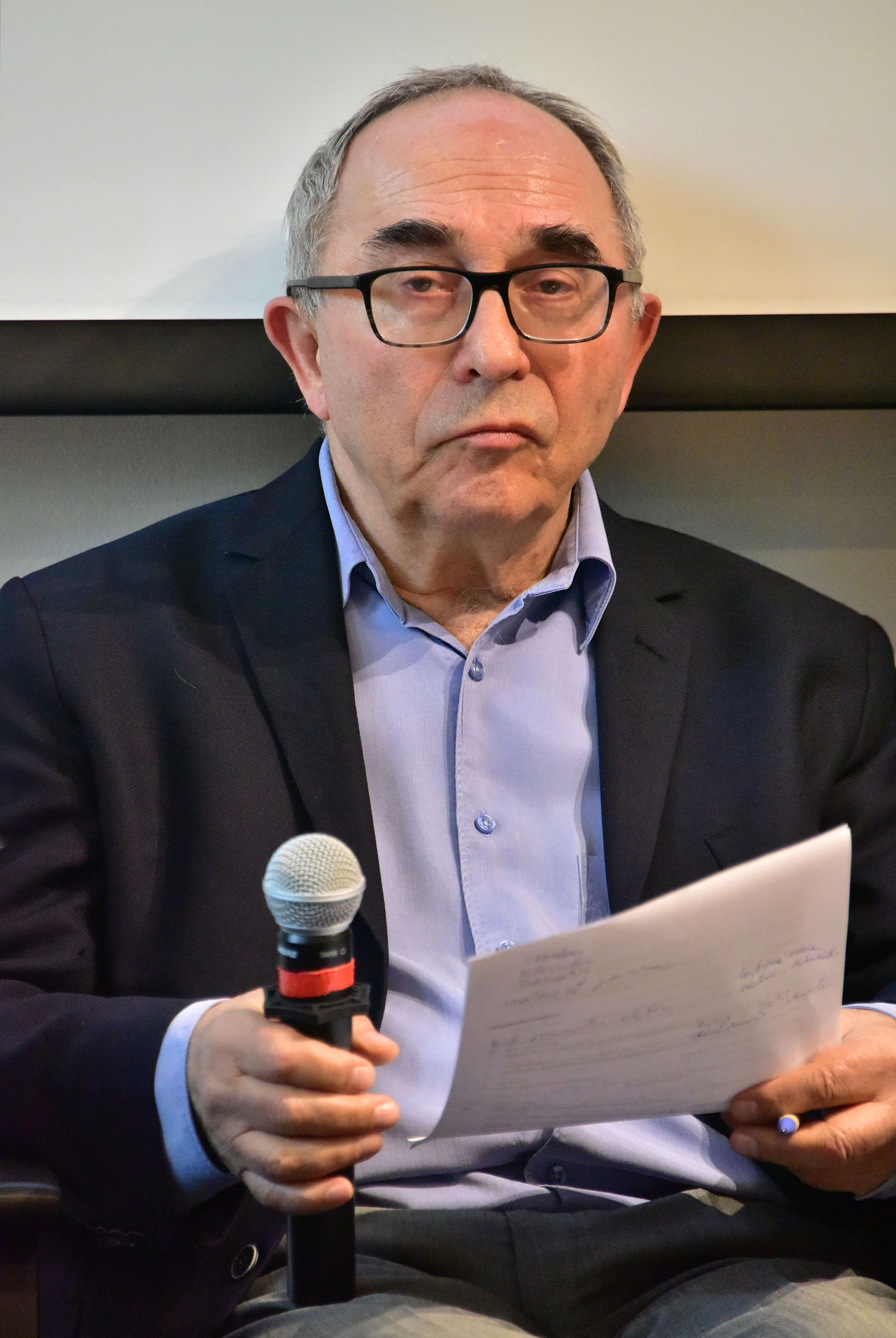
- Born: December 10, 1940 (age 85); Białystok
- Occupations: Writer and political activist
- Children: Piotr Smolar
- Father: Grzegorz Smolar

Aleksander Smolar (born December 10, 1940, in Białystok) is a Polish writer, political activist and adviser, president of the Stefan Batory Foundation, senior researcher at French National Centre for Scientific Research. He is son of prominent communist activist Grzegorz Smolar, and father of writer Piotr Smolar.

== Biography ==
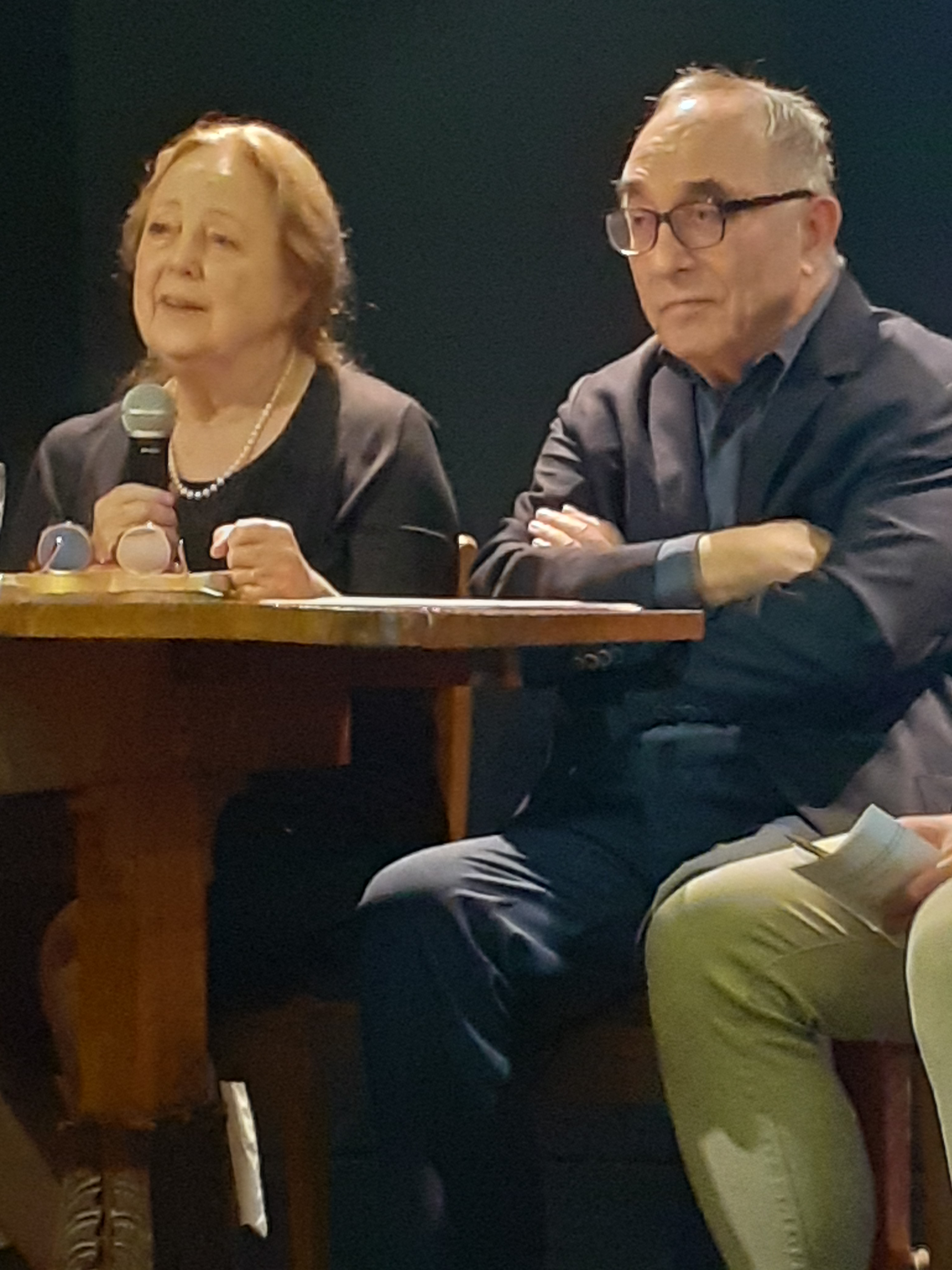
Irena Grudzińska-Gross and Aleksander Smolar in 2023.

=== Upbringing ===
Aleksander Smolar was born to the family of Grzegorz Smolar, a communist activist and an activist of the Jewish community in Poland.

Smolar became a member of the Polish Youth Union between 1954 and 1957, and then a member of the Union of Socialist Youth between 1958 and 1964.

=== Education ===
Aleksander Smolar studied at the Faculty of Communications at the Warsaw University of Technology but then transferred to the University of Warsaw to study economics and sociology. At that time, he worked at the university as an assistant lecturer of Włodzimierz Brus.

Smolar was a member of the communist Polish United Workers' Party (PZPR). He was removed from the party for publicly defending Leszek Kołakowski, a Polish revisionist Marxist philosopher who was critical of Marxism–Leninism.

=== Political activism ===
Smolar took part in the March 1968 events, a series of protests by students and young factory workers against the repressive nature of the communist party in Poland. He was arrested and imprisoned until February 1969.

He was expelled from the university and after being released from prison worked in heavy industry. In 1971 he emigrated from Poland, going to Italy, United Kingdom and France. Eventually he began working for the French National Centre for Scientific Research in Paris.

In 1973, he began publishing a quarterly political journal Aneks, which he continued until 1990. He served as a spokesperson for the Workers' Defence Committee (Komitet Obrony Robotników) a civil society group which aided the families of workers who were being persecuted by the communist authorities. He also served as a representative of the Committee for Social Self-Defense KOR (Komitet Samoobrony Społecznej KOR) abroad.

=== Role in post-Cold War Poland ===
After the fall of communism in 1989 in Poland, Smolar served as an adviser to the first democratically elected prime minister of Poland, Tadeusz Mazowiecki From 1992-1993, Smolar served as advisor for foreign policy to prime minister Hanna Suchocka.

In 1990, he was named president of the Stefan Batory Foundation in Warsaw.

Smolar remained active in political commentary. He is very critical of Poland’s ruling Law and Justice Party because of their illiberal tendency.

== Selected publications ==
- Globalization, Power and Democracy. (co-edited by Marc Plattner), The Johns Hopkins University Press, Washington, 2000
- Entre Kant et Kosovo. Etudes offertes à Pierre Hassner. (co-written with Anne-Marie Le Gloannec), Presses de Sciences Po, Paris 2003
- Tabu i niewinność, ("Taboo and Innocence"), Universitas, Kraków 2010

== See also ==
- Politics of Poland
- List of Poles
