= New Theatre, Łódź =

Theatre in Lodz, Poland

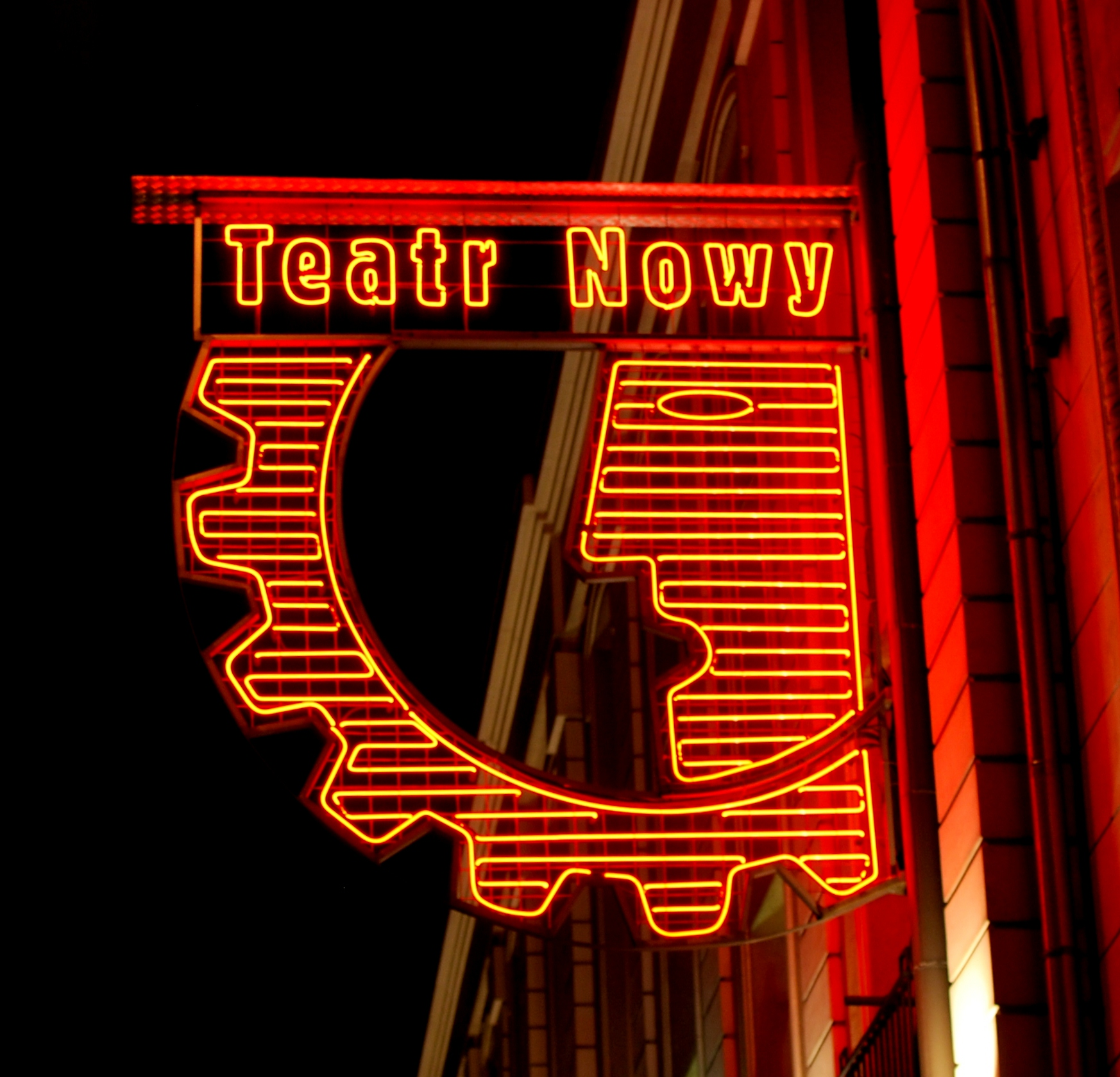
Theatre's logo as a neon sign (2012)

The New Theatre in Łódź also known as the Kazimierz Dejmek New Theatre (Polish: Teatr Nowy w Łodzi or Teatr Nowy im. Kazimierza Dejmka w Łodzi) is one of the repertory theatres in Łódź (Poland), established in 1949. The theatre presents a varied programme, including international classic drama, and new plays by contemporary playwrights. In addition to performances at the Nowy Theatre building, the Nowy Theatre tours productions at theatres across the Łódź region, Poland and abroad.

== History ==
In 1949, the Young Actors' Group (Polish: Grupa Młodych Aktorów), with Kazimierz Dejmek as one of their leaders, organized a series of workshops during which those assembled worked on learning the Stanislavski's system. It was this group that went on to create the New Theatre. The theatre was initially collectively managed and in November 1949 presented its first jointly directed premiere, a production of a Czech repertory play by Vašek Káňa titled Grinder Karhan's Work Brigade (Czech: Parta brusiče Karhana). At this time, beginning with the January 1949 convention of the Polish Writers' Union held in the city of Szczecin, Socialist realism became the governing aesthetic doctrine.

In 1950 Kazimierz Dejmek assumed the position of intendat and artistic director of the institution and abandoned acting as a profession. He remained the theatre's director until 1962. Later he held that position between 1974 and 1979, as well as in 2002. In 2008 the New Theatre was named after him, but the full title is rarely used.

In February 1950, communist President Bolesław Bierut awarded the theatre with the Order of the Banner of Work. In November 2019, Ministry of Culture and National Heritage awarded the Nowy Theatre with the Silver Medal for Merit to Culture – Gloria Artis.
