= Jan Lityński =

Polish politician (1946–2021)

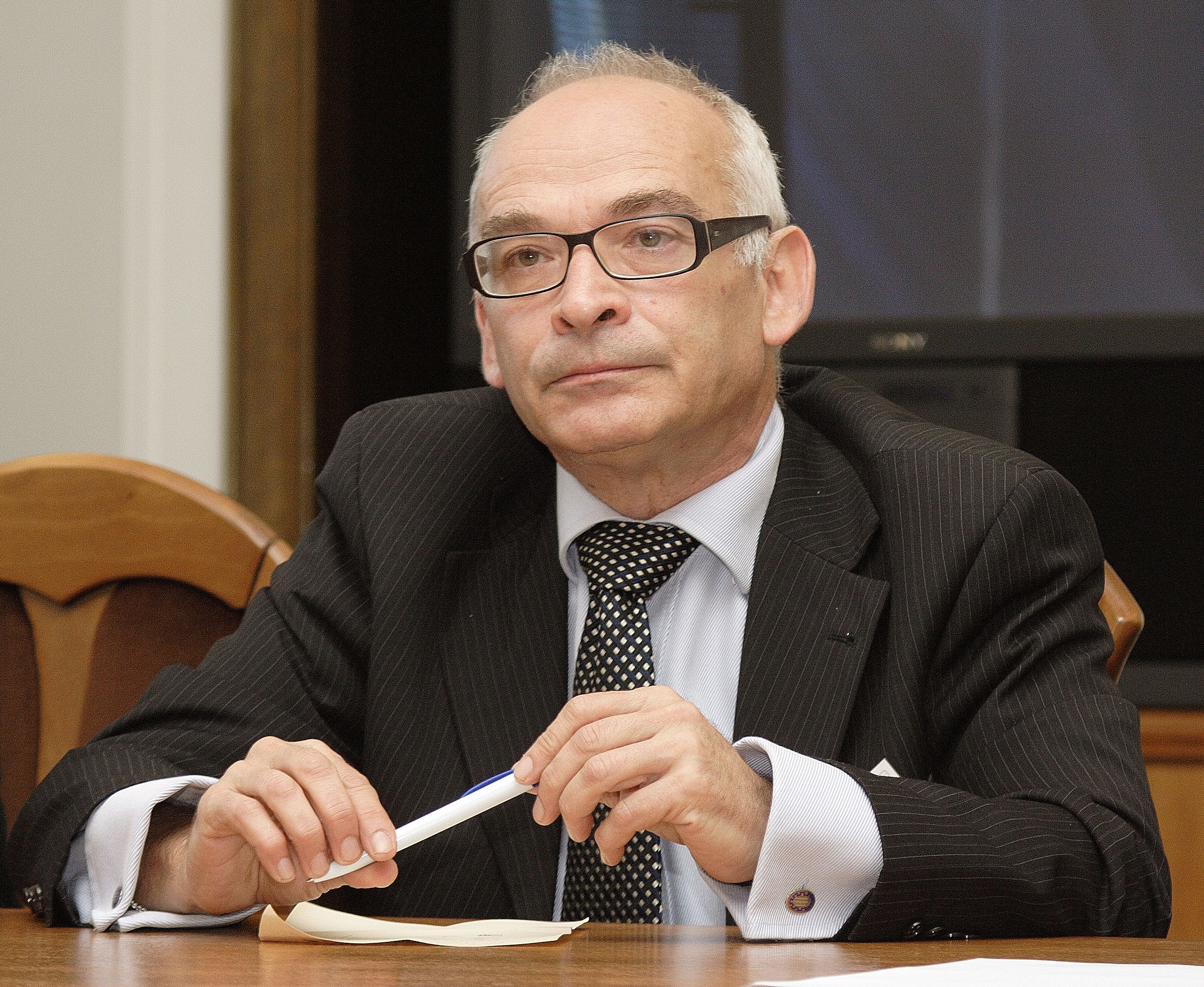
- Lityński in attendance at the Senate to commemorate the anniversary of Robotnik
- Born: January 18, 1946; Warsaw, Republic of Poland
- Died: February 21, 2021 (aged 75); Pułtusk, Republic of Poland
- Resting place: Powązki Military Cemetery
- Occupation: Journalist
- Notable work: PSL: Model Oporu
- Political party: PD
- Other political affiliations: ROAD
- Movement: Banana youth
- Spouses: Anna Dodziuk; Krystyna Zegarska; Elżbieta Bogucka
- Children: Barbara Lityńska
- Parents: Ryszard Perl-Lityński (father); Regina Lityńska née Lorenc (mother)
- Relatives: Feliks Perl

Deputy
- In office 4 June 1989 – 27 October 1991
- President: Wojciech Jaruzelski until 22 December 1990 Lech Wałęsa from 22 December 1990
- Prime Minister: Tadeusz Mazowiecki
- Parliamentary group: Solidarity Citizens' Committee
- Constituency: Świdnica

Deputy
- In office 27 October 1991 – 19 September 1993
- President: Lech Wałęsa
- Prime Minister: Jan Olszewski
- Parliamentary group: Democratic Union
- Constituency: Wałbrzych

Deputy
- In office 19 September 1993 – 21 September 1997
- President: Lech Wałęsa until 23 December 1995 Aleksander Kwaśniewski from 23 December 1995
- Prime Minister: Waldemar Pawlak
- Parliamentary group: Democratic Union
- Constituency: Wałbrzych

Deputy
- In office 21 September 1997 – 23 September 2001
- President: Aleksander Kwaśniewski
- Prime Minister: Jerzy Buzek
- Parliamentary group: Freedom Union
- Constituency: Wałbrzych

Jan Lityński (Warsaw, 18 January 1946 – Pułtusk, 21 February 2021) was a Polish politician, journalist, and opposition activist. During the 1968 political crisis he was associated with the so-called banana youth. Lityński Was later a Deputy of the Sejm between 1989 and 2001.
