= Gomułka aliyah =

1956–1960 aliyah from Poland

The Gomułka aliyah was a wave of aliyah (immigration of Jews from the diaspora to the land of Israel) from Communist Poland during 1956 to 1960, when Poland permitted free Jewish emigration. It was named after Władysław Gomułka the de facto communist ruler of Poland at the time. Estimated 50,000 arrived from Poland to Israel by the way of the Gomułka aliyah, including some 13,000 to 15,000 of the Jews from the Soviet Union, which were allowed to repatriate to Poland after their World War II flight and post-WWII forced resettlement of Polish citizens to the Soviet Union. There were certain issues with the absorption of this aliyah into the Israeli society, for a number of reasons, primarily due to the higher expectations of Polish Jews, which were from the higher strata of the society in their country of origin.

== See also ==
- 1968 Polish political crisis § Emigration of Polish citizens of Jewish origin
