= George C. Minden =

- Born: February 19, 1921; Bucharest, Romania
- Died: April 9, 2006 (aged 85); Manhattan, New York City, U.S.
- Education: University of Bucharest
- Occupation: Intelligence operative
- Spouse(s): Margarete Schmidt; Marilyn Miller
- Children: 3 sons, 1 daughter

George C. Minden (February 19, 1921 - April 9, 2006) was a Romanian-born intelligence operative who, as the president of the International Literary Center, ran a covert book distribution program for Eastern Europe financed by the Central Intelligence Agency (CIA) during the Cold War. By the end of his tenure, it had helped send more than 2 million books into Communist countries.

Minden oversaw the careful selection of titles intended to introduce Eastern Bloc readers to liberal, philosophical, and literary works that challenged totalitarian ideologies. These included 1984 and Animal Farm by George Orwell, The Open Society and Its Enemies by Karl Popper, Darkness at Noon by Arthur Koestler, and Lolita by Vladimir Nabokov. Distribution methods varied and included mailing books directly, using diplomatic pouches, and relying on students or travelers to carry materials across borders. Recipients ranged from intellectuals and academics to libraries and underground samizdat networks such as Teresa Bogucka's "Flying Library" operating within Communist countries.
