= Committee in Support of Solidarity =

Polish-American organization

The Committee in Support of Solidarity (CSS) was an organization created on December 14, 1981, in New York City to facilitate publication of information about martial law in Poland.

The committee created its first Information Bulletin in New York City on December 22, 1981, during the period of martial law in Poland. Spokespeople for the committee as of December 12, 1982, were Miroslaw Chojecki, Jakub Karpiński, Wojciech Karpiński, Agnieszka Kolakowska, Irena Lasota, Piotr Naimski and Eric Chenoweth. Press spokespeople were Christopher Wilcock and Agnieszka Kolakowska. To attract funding in support of Solidarity activity the committee was helped by the group of American-Polish scientists organized by Professors Stefan Niewiarowski of Temple University and Zbyszek Darzynkiewicz of the Memorial Sloan Kettering Cancer Center. The committee later became the Institute for Democracy in Eastern Europe.
