= Banana youth =

Term to describe affluent youths in Poland

Banana youth Bananowa młodzież
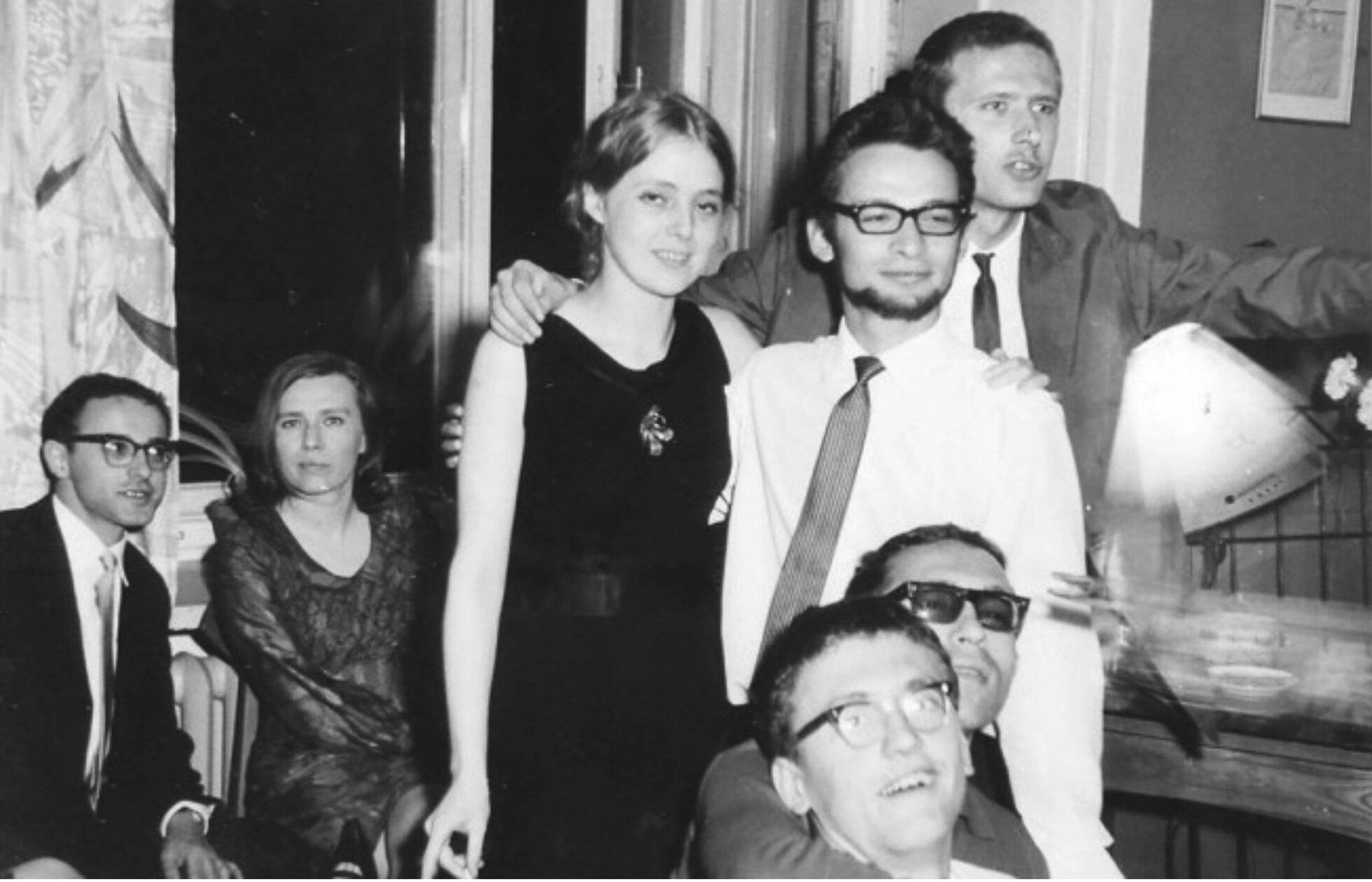
- A group of so-called banana youths including Jan T. Gross and Aleksander Smolar (front), Irena Grudzińska, Jan Lityński and Adam Michnik (standing), and Jan Kofman and Barbara Skowrońska (seated), 1967
- Years active: 1960s
- Country: Polish People's Republic
- Major figures: Adam Michnik; Henryk Szlajfer

Banana youth (Polish: bananowa młodzież) was a term coined in the Polish People's Republic during the 1960s to denigrate the children of the nomenklatura, particularly those who participated in the March 1968 protests. The name referenced the banana as a consumer-symbol of out-of-touch affluence at the time.

== Emergence ==
The phrase 'banana youth' first came into use during the period of Endo-Communism as a derogatory term to describe the offspring of the Polish nomenklatura who were deemed to have aspirations remote from those of the so-called 'Jan Kowalski', or average worker. The allusion to the banana was in the context of consumer shortages in which such exotic fruit was restricted to the diets of the elite. The term gained particular prominence as a means of discrediting those who took part in organising during the March 1968 protests. In March of that year the national newspaper Życie Warszawy described the archetypal banana youth as aloof from the average worker and ignorant of their economic and social concerns.

== Banana youth in post-communist Poland ==
In post-communist Poland the term banana youth has been used to critique the emergence of a new class system under capitalism. The phrase has been used to negatively denote those who are perceived to be entitled and affluent youths. After a brawl involving security guards and intoxicated young people outside Złote Tarasy in Warsaw, the latter were described in reports as 'banana youths'. The Colombian telenovela Niños Ricos, Pobres Padres, about class entitlement, was broadcast in Poland on Polonia 1 under the title Bananowa młodzież.

In the 21st century the phrase banana youth has often been used with reference to music in Poland. In a 2018 interview, the rapper Hans, from the Polish hip hop group Pięć Dwa, described the richer cohort of fans of his music as 'banana youth'. In a 2023 TVP1 documentary the populist journalist Anita Gargas investigated the annual music festival held in Garbicz, which was criticised for allowing banana youths to destroy the natural environment. In the same year the Polish TV personality Kuba Wojewódzki described the band Kwiat Jabłoni as banana youth during an appearance on his show. The spread of drill music to Poland has also been derided in the media as an affectation of modern banana youth.

In April 2019 the politically appointed director of the National Museum in Warsaw, Jerzy Miziołek, made the controversial decision to remove a work by the artist Natalia LL from public display. Miziołek claimed the work, Sztuka konsumpcyjna which depicts a woman suggestively consuming a banana, was inappropriate for the museum's audience. His decision resulted in a public backlash, with a demonstration held outside the museum in which participants ate bananas. The protestors were subsequently referred to as contemporary banana youth.
