= Kazimierz Dejmek =

Polish theatre and film director

Kazimierz Dejmek, photographed at the University of Warsaw on 11 March 1981

Kazimierz Dejmek (17 May 1924 – 31 December 2002) was a Polish actor, theatre and film director, and politician. During his career he managed the New Theatre in Łódź (since 2008 named after him), the National Theatre, Warsaw, and the Teatr Polski, Warsaw. From 1993 to 1996 he served as Poland's Minister of Culture. In 1984 Dejmek was awarded the Witkacy Prize - Critics' Circle Award and in 1989 the Grand Cross of the Order of Polonia Restituta, one of his country's highest honours.

== Life and career ==
Kazimierz Dejmek was born in Kowel (now in Ukraine) in 1924 and attended school in Rzeszów. During World War II he was a partisan in the Peasants' Party Special Units and in 1943 joined Poland's Home Army. Shortly after leaving the army in 1944, he made his debut as an actor in Rzeszów playing Jasiek in Stanisław Wyspiański's The Wedding. In the years 1945 - 1949 he performed in the Lower Silesian Theatre in Jelenia Góra (now Cyprian Norwid Theatre) and the Wojska Polskiego Theatre in Łódź and studied at the National Higher School of Theatre. In 1950, he abandoned acting as a career to become the artistic director of the New Theatre. He served there until 1962, when he became the manager of the National Theatre in Warsaw.

At the end of November 1967, the National Theatre presented Adam Mickiewicz's 1824 play Dziady (Forefathers' Eve) directed by Dejmek. The production was to have considerable repercussions for his career and for Poland itself. After the 11th performance (on 30 January 1968), Poland's Communist government banned any further performances of the play on the grounds that it contained "anti-Russian" and "anti-socialist" references. Dejmek was expelled from the Communist Party and fired from the National Theatre. The ban was condemned by both the Warsaw Writers' and the Actors' Union, followed by a student protest at the University of Warsaw which spread throughout Poland. From 1969 to 1972 Dejmek was basically in exile and primarily worked outside Poland where he directed in the Nationaltheatret in Oslo, the Schauspielhaus in Düsseldorf, the Burgtheater in Vienna, and Giorgio Strehler's Piccolo Teatro in Milan.

Following his return to Poland in 1972, Dejmek directed at several major theatres, and in 1974 he again assumed the directorship of the Teatr Nowy. He remained in that post until 1981 when he became the manager and artistic director of the Teatr Polski in Warsaw. A member of the Polish People's Party, he was elected to the Polish Parliament in 1993, and from 1993 to 1996 served as his country's minister of culture. (Note: Lech Wałęsa was President of Poland from 1990 to 1995). Dejmek returned to his theatre career in 1997, and in 2001 assumed the directorship of the Teatr Nowy for the third time. Kazimierz Dejmek died in Warsaw on 31 December 2002, just weeks before the premiere of his new production of Hamlet.

He is interred at the Doły Cemetery in Łódź.

On 14 January 2008, the Teatr Nowy was renamed in his honour. His son, Piotr Dejmek (born 1953), became a noted television actor in Poland and later a film director and producer.
