= Henryk Szlajfer =

Polish economist and political scientist

Prof. Henryk Szlajfer

Poland Ambassador to the United Nations and OSCE in Vienna
- In office 2000–2004
- Preceded by: Jerzy Maria Nowak
- Succeeded by: Jacek Bylica

Personal details
- Born: November 7, 1947 (age 78) Wrocław, Poland
- Education: University of Warsaw
- Profession: Diplomat, scientist

Henryk Szlajfer (born 7 November 1947, Wrocław) is a Polish economist and political scientist of Jewish origin, professor at the University of Warsaw, in the years 1993–2008, director of the Department of Strategy and Policy Planning, then of the American Department and archive at the Ministry of Foreign Affairs, appointed by then Prime Minister Jerzy Buzek as an ambassador ad personam, former ambassador-head of the Polish Permanent Representation to the OSCE, IAEA and other international organizations in Vienna.

== Biography ==
=== Education ===
From 1962, he was a member of the Union of Socialist Youth, from which he was expelled in March 1967. From 1965 to June 1967 he was a member of the Babel Club. He was considered one of the so-called commandos.

In 1968 Szlajfer and Adam Michnik, at that time students of the University of Warsaw, were expelled from the university for their opposition activity. On March 8, 1968, a rally took place in their defence, which marked the beginning of mass student protests known as the March events. At that time, students of the University of Warsaw, were expelled from the university for their opposition activities. A rally was held in their defense on March 8, 1968, which became the beginning of mass student protests known as the March Events. On March 10, 1968, he was arrested and imprisoned in the Warsaw-Mokotów Remand Center. He was sentenced to two years of prison. Released on February 18, 1969. In the years 1980–1989 he was active in the NSZZ "Solidarność" and edited the underground press (including: "Wolnego Związkowca", "Krytyka" quarterly, "Tygodnika Wojennego"). In the years 1989–1990 he was an expert of the Obywatelski Klub Parlamentarny in the parliamentary committee on the economic system and industry.

Associated with the so-called banana youth, he was sentenced to 2 years in prison.

In 1973 he graduated from Faculty of Economic Sciences, University of Warsaw. In 1977 he received his doctorate from the University of Warsaw, and in 2006 he received a habilitation in the humanities from the Polish Academy of Sciences in the field of political sciences. In 2013 he obtained the title of professor of social sciences.

=== Career ===
In the years 1993–2008 he was employed at the Ministry of Foreign Affairs – he was director of the Department of Strategic Research (after the reorganization of the Department of Strategy and Policy Planning). In 1998 he was appointed ambassador ad personam. He has been Ambassador, Permanent Representative of the Republic of Poland to the OSCE, IAEA and other international organizations in Vienna from 2000 until July 31, 2004 on the dismissal of the Ambassador of the Republic of Poland.

Then, until 2006, he was director of the Americas Department of the Ministry of Foreign Affairs, and from 2006 to 2008 director of the Ministry of Foreign Affairs archives. In 2005, the Foreign Affairs Committee of the Sejm accepted his candidacy for ambassador to the United States. He resigned from the position because the IPN refused to grant him injured party status. In 2008, he was an advisor to the head of the Foreign Intelligence Agency, and in 2009–2010, a special advisor to the Minister of Foreign Affairs for cooperation with the USA.

He was editor-in-chief of the quarterly magazine Sprawy Międzynarodowe (from 1992) and its English version The Polish Quarterly of International Affairs. Member of the editorial board of the Studia Polityczne magazine (ISP PAN), associated with the Instytut Studiów Politycznych Polskiej Akademii Nauk. In the 1990s he was in the Editorial Council of the Journal of Latin American Studies (Cambridge University Press).

== Selected publications ==
- Economic Nationalism and Globalization: Lessons from Latin America and Central Europe, Brill, Leiden 2012
- Western Europe, Eastern Europe and World Development 13th-18th Centuries: Collection of Essays of Marian Małowist (co-editor Jean Batou), Brill, Leiden 2009
- The Faltering Economy. The Problem of Accumulation under Monopoly Capitalism (współredaktor John B. Foster), Monthly Review Press, New York 1984
- From the Polish Underground. Selections from "Krytyka", 1978-1993 (współredaktor Michael Bernhard), The Pennsylvania State University Press 1995
- Europa Środkowo-Wschodnia i Ameryka Południowa 1918-1939: szkice o nacjonalizmie ekonomicznym (Redakcja), PWN, Warszawa 1992
- Dezintegracja przestrzeni eurazjatyckiej a bezpieczeństwo Europy Środkowej i Wschodniej, PISM, Warszawa 1993
- Polacy – Żydzi: zderzenie stereotypów:esej dla przyjaciół i innych, Wydawnictwo Naukowe SCHOLAR, Warszawa 2003
- Droga na skróty: nacjonalizm gospodarczy w Ameryce Łacińskiej i Europie Środkowo-Wschodniej w epoce pierwszej globalizacji: kategorie, analiza, kontekst porównawczy, ISP PAN, Warszawa 2005
- Modernizacja zależności: kapitalizm i rozwój w Ameryce Łacińskiej, Osollineum, Wrocław 1984
- Nineteenth century Latin America: two models of capitalism: the case of Haiti and Paraguay
