= Teresa Bogucka =

Polish journalist and writer

Teresa Bogucka (born April 1945, Zakopane, Poland) is a Polish journalist, writer, and former democratic opposition activist associated with the banana youth in Communist Poland. Her father was the art critic Janusz Bogucki. She played a key part in underground publishing and samizdat circulation, including organizing a covert “Flying Library” to distribute prohibited literature across Poland while avoiding detection by state security. This literature may have been indirectly received from the Central Intelligence Agency's covert book distribution programme led by George C. Minden.

== Books ==
- 1997:Polak po komunizmie [The Pole after Communism], Znak, Kraków, Fundacja im. Stefana Batorego, Warsaw
- 2000: Cienie w ogrodzie [Shadows in the garden], Sic!, Warsaw
- 2002: Triumfujące profanum: telewizja po przełomie 1989 [Triumphing Profanity: Television of the Break of 1989], Sic!, Warsaw

== Awards and recognition ==
- 2006: Officer's Cross of the Order of Polonia Restituta
- 2004: Kisiel Prize
- 1998 Her book Polak po komunizmie was nominated for the Nike Award
- 1991: Polish PEN Club Award
