= 1968 Polish political crisis =

Political crisis in Poland regarding antisemitism

- Part of the protests of 1968
- Date: March–August 1968
- Location: A number of cities across Poland, including Warsaw, Kraków, Lublin, Gliwice, Wrocław, Gdańsk, Poznań, and Łódź
- Caused by: Reformist demands and protests, political crisis within the PZPR.
- Result: Władysław Gomułka retains power; Massive antisemitic (branded "anti-Zionist") propaganda campaign; exodus of remaining Jews from Poland; Participation of Poland in the invasion of Czechoslovakia

Parties
Polish United Workers' Party hardliners: Partisans	Government of Poland: Puławians remnants	Student protesters: Marxist reformists; Anti-communist dissidents

Lead figures
Mieczysław Moczar; Andrzej Werblan; Grzegorz Korczyński	Władysław Gomułka; Józef Cyrankiewicz Wojciech Jaruzelski; Kazimierz Świtała; Zenon Nowak	Adam Michnik; Jacek Kuroń; Karol Modzelewski; Kazimierz Dejmek

A series of major student, intellectual and other protests against the ruling Polish United Workers' Party of the Polish People's Republic took place in Poland in March 1968. The crisis led to the suppression of student strikes by security forces in all major academic centres across the country and the subsequent repression of the Polish dissident movement. It was also accompanied by mass emigration following an antisemitic (branded "anti-Zionist") campaign waged by the minister of internal affairs, General Mieczysław Moczar, with the approval of First Secretary Władysław Gomułka of the Polish United Workers' Party (PZPR). The protests overlapped with the events of the Prague Spring in neighboring Czechoslovakia – raising new hopes of democratic reforms among the intelligentsia. The Czechoslovak unrest culminated in the Warsaw Pact invasion of Czechoslovakia on 20 August 1968.

The anti-Zionist campaign began in 1967, and was carried out in conjunction with the USSR's withdrawal of all diplomatic relations with Israel after the Six-Day War, but also involved a power struggle within the PZPR itself. The subsequent purges within the ruling party, led by Moczar and his faction, failed to topple Gomułka's government but resulted in an exile from Poland of thousands of communist individuals of Jewish ancestry, including professionals, party officials and secret police functionaries appointed by Joseph Stalin following the Second World War. In carefully staged public displays of support, factory workers across Poland were assembled to publicly denounce Zionism. At least 13,000 Poles of Jewish origin emigrated in 1968–1972 as a result of being fired from their positions and various other forms of harassment.

== Background ==
The political turmoil of the late 1960s was exemplified in the West by increasingly violent protests against the Vietnam War and included numerous instances of protest and revolt, especially among students, that reverberated across Europe in 1968. The movement was reflected in the Eastern Bloc by the events of the Prague Spring, beginning 5 January 1968. A wave of protests in Czechoslovakia marked the high point of a broader series of dissident social mobilization. According to Ivan Krastev, the 1968 movement in Western Europe, emphasizing individual sovereignty, was fundamentally different from that in the Eastern Bloc, concerned primarily with national sovereignty.

In Poland, a growing crisis having to do with communist party control over universities, the literary community, and intellectuals in general, marked the mid-1960s. Those persecuted for political activism on campus included Jacek Kuroń, Karol Modzelewski, Adam Michnik and Barbara Toruńczyk, among others. A decade earlier, Poland was a scene of the Poznań 1956 protests and the Polish October events.

== Reaction to Arab–Israeli war of 1967 ==
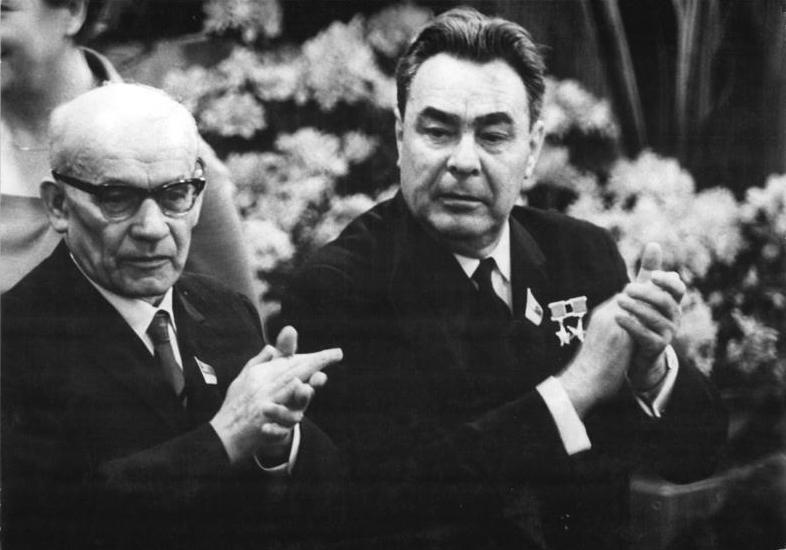
Władysław Gomułka with Leonid Brezhnev in Berlin on 17 April 1967

The events of 1967 and Polish communist leaders' necessity to follow the Soviet lead altered the relatively benign relations between People's Poland and Israel. The combination of international and domestic factors gave rise in Poland to a campaign of hate against purported internal enemies, among whom the Jews would become the most salient target.

As the Israeli–Arab Six-Day War started on 5 June 1967, the Polish Politburo met the following day and made policy determinations, declaring condemnation of "Israel's aggression" and full support for the "just struggle of the Arab countries". First Secretary Władysław Gomułka and Prime Minister Józef Cyrankiewicz went to Moscow on 9 June for a Middle East conference of communist leaders. The participants deliberated in a depressing atmosphere. The decisions made included the Warsaw Pact's continuation of military and financial support for the Arab states and the breaking of diplomatic relations with Israel, in which only Romania refused to participate. A media campaign commenced in Poland and was soon followed by "anti-Israeli imperialism" rallies held in various towns and places of employment. After the government delegation's return to Warsaw, Gomułka, pessimistic and fearful of a possible nuclear confrontation and irritated by the reports of support for Israel among many Polish Jews, on 19 June proclaimed at the Trade Union Congress that Israel's aggression had been "met with applause in Zionist circles of Jews – Polish citizens." Gomułka specifically invited "those who feel that these words are addressed to them" to emigrate, but Edward Ochab and some other Politburo members objected and the statement was deleted before the speech's publication. Gomułka did not issue a call for anti-Jewish personnel purges, but the so-called "anti-Zionist" campaign got underway anyway, supported by his close associates Zenon Kliszko and Ignacy Loga-Sowiński. It was eagerly amplified by General Mieczysław Moczar, minister of internal affairs, by some military leaders who had long been waiting for an opportunity to "settle with the Jews", and by other officials. A list of 382 "Zionists" was presented at the ministry on 28 June and the purge slowly developed, beginning with Jewish generals and other high-ranking officers of the Polish armed forces. About 150 Jewish military officers were fired in 1967–1968, including Czesław Mankiewicz, national air defense chief. Minister of Defense Marian Spychalski tried to defend Mankiewicz and by doing so compromised his own position. The Ministry of Internal Affairs renewed its proposal to ban the Jewish organizations from receiving foreign contributions from the American Jewish Joint Distribution Committee. This time, unlike on previous occasions, the request was quickly granted by the Secretariat of the PZPR's Central Committee and the well-developed Jewish social, educational and cultural organized activities in Poland faced stiff reductions or even practical liquidation.

About 200 people lost their jobs and were removed from the party top leadership in 1967, including Leon Kasman, chief editor of Trybuna Ludu, the party's main daily newspaper. Kasman was Moczar's hated rival from the time of the war when he arrived from the Soviet Union and was parachuted into Poland. After March 1968, when Moczar's ministry was finally given the freehand it had long sought, 40 employees were fired from the editorial staff of the Polish Scientific Publishers (PWN). This major state publishing house had produced a number of volumes of the official Great Universal Encyclopedia. Moczar and others protested in the fall of 1967 the supposedly unbalanced treatment of World War II issues, namely stressing Jewish martyrdom and the disproportionate numbers of Jews killed in Nazi extermination camps.

In the words of Polish scholar Włodzimierz Rozenbaum, the Six-Day War "provided Gomułka with an opportunity 'to kill several birds with one stone': he could use an "anti-Zionist" policy to undercut the appeal of the liberal wing of the party; he could bring forward the Jewish issue to weaken the support for the nationalist faction (in the party) and make his own position even stronger..." while securing political prospects for his own supporters.

On 19 June 1967, Gomułka warned in his speech: "We don't want an establishment of a fifth column in our country". The sentence was deleted from a published version, but such views he repeated and developed further in successive speeches, for example on 19 March 1968. On 27 June 1967, the first secretary characterized Romania's position as shameful, predicted production of nuclear arms by Israel and spoke generally of consequences faced by people who had "two souls and two fatherlands". Following Gomułka's anti-Israel and anti-Jewish rhetoric, the security services began screening officials of Jewish origin and looking for 'hidden Zionists' in Polish institutions.

== Protest in Warsaw ==
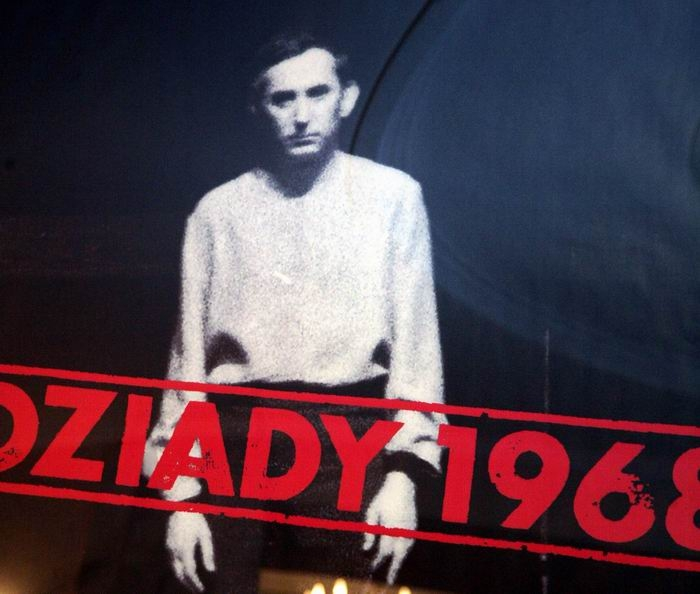
The Dziady theatrical event and its cancellation triggered student protests and violent response by the authorities.

The outbreak of the March 1968 unrest was seemingly triggered by a series of events in Warsaw, but in reality, it was a culmination of trends accumulating in Poland over several years. The economic situation was deteriorating and a drastic increase in the prices of meat came into effect in 1967. In 1968, the market was destabilized further by rumors of upcoming currency exchange and the ensuing panic. Higher norms were enforced for industrial productivity with wages reduced at the same time. First Secretary Gomułka was afraid of all changes. The increasingly heavy censorship stifled intellectual life, the boredom of stagnation and the mood of hopelessness (lack of career prospects) generated social conflict. The disparity between the expectations raised by the Polish October movement of 1956 and the actuality of the "real socialism" life of the 1960s led to mounting frustration.

At the end of January 1968, after its poor reception by the Central Committee of the ruling PZPR, the government authorities banned the performance of a Romantic play by Adam Mickiewicz called Dziady (written in 1824), directed by Kazimierz Dejmek at the National Theatre, Warsaw. It was claimed that the play contained Russophobic and anti-Soviet references and represented an unduly pro-religion stance. Dziady had been staged 11 times, the last time on 30 January. The ban was followed by a demonstration after the final performance, which resulted in numerous police detentions. Dejmek was expelled from the party and subsequently fired from the National Theatre. He left Poland and returned in 1973, to continue directing theatrical productions.

In mid-February, a petition signed by 3,000 people (or over 4,200, depending on the source) protesting the censorship of Dziady was submitted to parliament by student protester Irena Lasota. Gathered for an extraordinary meeting on 29 February with over 400 attendees, the Warsaw chapter of the Polish Writers' Union condemned the ban and other encroachments on free speech rights. The speakers blamed the faction of Minister Moczar and the party in general for antisemitic incidents, as that campaign was gaining traction.^{[a]} On 4 March, the removal from the University of Warsaw of dissidents Adam Michnik and Henryk Szlajfer, members of the Komandosi group, was announced by officials. A crowd of some 500 (or about 1,000) students rallying at the university on 8 March was attacked violently by organized "worker activists" (probably plainclothes police) and by police in uniform. Nonetheless, other institutions of higher learning in Warsaw joined the protest a day later.

== Student- and intellectual-led movement ==
Dariusz Gawin of the Polish Academy of Sciences pointed out that the March 1968 events have been mythologized in subsequent decades beyond their modest original aims, under the lasting influence of former members of Komandosi, a left-wing student political activity group. During the 1968 crisis, the dissident academic circles produced very little in terms of written accounts or programs. They experienced a moral shock because of propaganda misrepresentations of their intentions and actions and the unexpectedly violent repressions. They also experienced an ideological shock, caused by the reaction of the authorities (aggression) and society (indifference) to their idealistic attempts to bring about revolutionary reform in the Polish People's Republic. The alienation of the reform movement from the ostensibly socialist system (and their own leftist views) had begun.

The students were naïve in terms of practical politics, but their leaders professed strongly leftist convictions, expressed in brief proclamations distributed in 1968. Following the spirit of the 1964 "revisionist" manifesto by Karol Modzelewski and Jacek Kuroń, they demanded respect for the ideals of the Marxist–Leninist "dictatorship of the proletariat" and principles of socialism. The protesting students sang "The Internationale" anthem. The storming of Warsaw University by the (fake) factory worker activists thus came as a total surprise to the students. The participants of the 8 March rally were met with violent beatings from ORMO volunteer reserve and ZOMO riot squads just as they were about to go home. The disproportionately brutal reaction of the security forces appeared to many observers to be a provocation perpetrated to aggravate the unrest and facilitate further rounds of repression, in the self-interest of political leaders. A comparable demonstration originated on 9 March at the Warsaw University of Technology and was also followed by confrontations with the police and arrests. Kuroń, Modzelewski and Michnik were imprisoned again and a majority of the Komandosi members were detained. In later accounts, however, the founding mythology of Poland's civil society movement (the late 1970s) and then of the establishment of the new democratic-liberal Poland would obliterate the socialist, leftist and revolutionary aspects of the March 1968 movement. Within a few days protests spread to Kraków, Lublin, Gliwice, Katowice, and Łódź (from 11 March), Wrocław, Gdańsk, and Poznań (12 March). The frequent demonstrations at the above locations were brutally suppressed by the police. Mass student strikes took place in Wrocław on 14–16 March, Kraków on 14–20 March, and Opole. A student committee at Warsaw University (11 March) and an inter-university committee in Kraków (13 March) were formed; attempts to organize were also made in Łódź and Wrocław. Efforts aimed at getting industrial workers involved, for example, employees of the state enterprises in Gdańsk, Wrocław and Kraków's Nowa Huta produced no tangible effects. But on 15 March in Gdańsk, 20,000 students and workers marched and fought several types of security forces totalling 3,700 men, into the late evening.

University students comprised less than 25% of those arrested for participating in opposition activities in March and April 1968 (their numerical predominance in the movement was a part of the subsequent myth, wrote historian Łukasz Kamiński). The leading role in the spreading countrywide street protests was played by young factory workers and secondary school students.

== Repressions ==
A media campaign besmirching targeted groups and individuals was conducted from 11 March. The Stalinist and Jewish ("non-Polish") roots of the supposed instigators were "exposed" and most printed press participated in the propagation of slander, with the notable exceptions of Polityka and Tygodnik Powszechny. Mass "spontaneous" rallies at places of employment and in squares of major cities took place. The participants demanded "Students resume their studies, writers their writing", "Zionists go to Zion!", or threatened "We'll tear off the head of the anti-Polish hydra". On 14 March, regional party secretary Edward Gierek in Katowice used strong language addressing the Upper Silesian crowds: (people who want to) "make our peaceful Silesian water more turbid ... those Zambrowskis, Staszewskis, Słonimskis and the company of the Kisielewski and Jasienica kind ... revisionists, Zionists, lackeys of imperialism ... Silesian water will crush their bones ...". Gierek introduced a new element during his speech: a statement of support for First Secretary Gomułka, who so far had been silent on the student protests, Zionism and other currently pressing issues.

This initial reluctance of the top leadership to express their position ended with a speech by Gomułka on 19 March. He eliminated the possibility of government negotiations with the strikers, extinguishing the participants' hope for a quick favorable settlement. Gomułka's speech, delivered before three thousand ("outstanding during the difficult days") party activists, was full of anti-intelligentsia accusations. The party management realized, he made it clear, that it was too early to fully comprehend and evaluate the nature and scope of the present difficulties. Gomułka sharply attacked the opposition leaders and named the few writers he particularly abhorred (Kisielewski, Jasienica and Szpotański), but offered a complex and differentiated analysis of the situation in Poland (Słonimski was named as an example of a Polish citizen whose sentiments were "cosmopolitan"). The first secretary attempted to pacify the growing antisemitic wave, asserting that most citizens of Jewish origin were loyal to Poland and were not a threat. Loyalty to Poland and socialism, not ethnicity, was the only criterion, the party valued highly those who had contributed and was opposed to any phenomena of antisemitic nature. It was understood that some people could feel ambivalent about where they belonged, and if some felt definitely more closely connected with Israel, Gomułka expected them to eventually emigrate. However, it may have been too late for such reasoned arguments and the carefully screened audience did not react positively: their collective display of hatred was shown on national television. Gomułka's remarks (reviewed, corrected and approved in advance by members of the Politburo and the Central Committee) were criticized a few days later at the meeting of first secretaries of the provincial party committees and the anti-Zionist campaign continued unabated. The internal bulletin of Mieczysław Moczar's Ministry of Internal Affairs spoke of a lack of clear declaration on Zionism on Gomułka's part and of "public hiding of criminals". Such criticism of the top party leader was unheard of and indicated the increasing influence and determination of Moczar's faction. In public, Moczar concentrated on issuing condemnations of the communists who came after the war from the Soviet Union and persecuted Polish patriots (including, from 1948, Gomułka himself, which may in part explain the first secretary's failure to dissociate himself from and his tacit approval of anti-Jewish excesses). The purges and attempts to resolve the power struggle at top echelons of the party entered their accelerated phase.

The mass protest movement and the repressions continued throughout March and April. The revolt was met with the dissolution of entire academic departments, the expulsion of thousands of students and many sympathizing faculty members (including Zygmunt Bauman, Leszek Kołakowski and Stefan Żółkiewski), arrests and court trials. National coordination by the students was attempted through a 25 March meeting in Wrocław; most of its attendees were jailed by the end of April. On 28 March, students at the University of Warsaw reacted to the firing of prominent faculty by adopting the Declaration of the Student Movement, which presented an outline of mature systemic reforms for Poland. The document formulated a new framework for opposition activities and established a conceptual precedent for the future Solidarity opposition movement postulates. The authorities responded by eliminating several university departments and enlisting many students in the military. The student protest activities, planned for 22 April, were prevented by the arrest campaign conducted in Warsaw, Kraków and Wrocław.

At least 2,725 people were arrested between 7 March and 6 April. According to internal government reports, the suppression was effective, although students were still able to disrupt the May Day ceremonies in Wrocław. Except for the relatively few well-recognized protest leaders, the known participants of the 1968 revolt generally did not reappear in later waves of opposition movement in Poland.

By mid-March, the protest campaign had spread to smaller towns. The distribution of fliers was reported in one hundred towns in March, forty in April, and, despite numerous arrests, continued even during the later months. Street demonstrations occurred in several localities in March. In different cities, the arrests and trials proceeded at a different pace, in part because of the discretion exercised by local authorities. Gdańsk had by far the highest rate of both the "penal-administrative procedures" and the cases that actually went to courts. The largest proportion of the arrested and detained nationwide during the March/April unrest belonged to the "workers" category.

A few dared to openly defend the students, including some writers, bishops, and the small parliamentary group of Catholic deputies Znak, led by Jerzy Zawieyski. Znak submitted an official interpellation on 11 March, addressed to the prime minister. They questioned the brutal anti-student interventions by the police and inquired about the government's intentions regarding the democratic demands of the students and of the "broad public opinion".

Following the Politburo meeting on 8 April, during which Stefan Jędrychowski strongly criticized the antisemitic campaign but a majority of the participants expressed the opposite view or supported Gomułka's "middle" course, a Sejm session indirectly dealt with the crisis from the 9th to the 11th of April. Prime Minister Józef Cyrankiewicz asserted that the Radio Free Europe used the Znak interpellation for its propaganda. Other speakers claimed that the interpellation was primarily aimed at getting the hostile foreign interests involved in Poland's affairs. Zawieyski spoke in a conciliatory tone, directing his comments and appealing to Gomułka and Zenon Kliszko, recognizing them as victims of the past (Stalinist) political persecution. He interpreted the recent beating by "unknown assailants" of Stefan Kisielewski, a Catholic publicist, as an attack on a representative of the Polish culture. The party leaders responded by terminating Zawieyski's membership in the Polish Council of State, a collective head of state organ, and banning him from holding a political office in the future. The participants in the public Sejm debate concentrated on attacking Znak and avoided altogether discussing the events and issues of the March protests or their suppression (the subjects of the interpellation).

The effectiveness of the ORMO interventions on university campuses and the eruption of further citizen discontent (see 1970 Polish protests) prompted the Ministry of Public Security to engage in massive expansion of this force, which at its peak in 1979 reached over 450,000 members.

== Anti-Zionist mobilization and purges, party politics ==
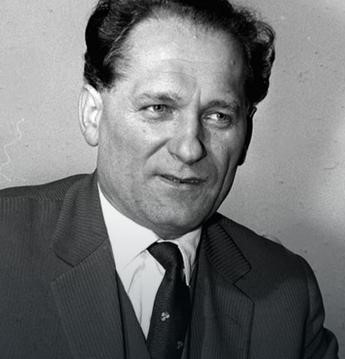
General Mieczysław Moczar initiated and led the widespread antisemitic campaign of 1968.

In March 1968, the anti-Zionist campaign, loud propaganda and mass mobilization were greatly intensified. The process of purging Jewish officials, ex-Stalinists, high-ranking rival communists and moral supporters of the current liberal opposition movement, was accelerated. Roman Zambrowski, Stefan Staszewski, Edward Ochab, Adam Rapacki and Marian Spychalski were among the top echelon party leaders removed or neutralized. Zambrowski, a Jewish veteran of the Polish communist movement, was singled out and purged from the party first (13 March), even though he had been politically inactive for several years and had nothing to do with the current crisis. Former First Secretary Ochab resigned his several high offices to protest "against the antisemitic campaign". On 11 April 1968, the Sejm instituted changes in some major leadership positions. Spychalski, leaving the Ministry of Defense, replaced Ochab in the more titular role as the chairman of the Council of State. Wojciech Jaruzelski became the new minister of defense. Rapacki, another opponent of antisemitic purges, was replaced by Stefan Jędrychowski at the Ministry of Foreign Affairs. A new higher education statute was designed to give the government greater control over the academic environment.

Gomułka considered revisionism rather than "Zionism" to be the main "danger". According to historian Dariusz Stola, the first secretary, whose wife was Jewish, harbored no antisemitic prejudices. But he opportunistically and instrumentally allowed and accepted the anti-Jewish initiative of Minister Moczar and the secret services Moczar controlled. The campaign gave Gomułka the tools he needed to combat the intellectual rebellion, prevent it from spreading into the worker masses (by "mobilizing" them and channelling their frustration against the stealth and alien "enemy"), resolve the party rivalries ultimately to his own advantage and stabilize the situation in Poland at the dangerous for the party time of the Prague Spring liberalizing movement in Czechoslovakia. Many Poles (irrespective of ethnic background) were accused of being Zionists. They were expelled from the party and/or had their careers terminated by policies that were cynical, prejudicial, or both. Long (sometimes conducted over several days) party meetings and discussions took place at the end of March and in early April within various state institutions and enterprises. They dealt with the "Zionism" issue and were devoted to the identification of those responsible and guilty (within the institution's own ranks), their expulsion from the party and demands for their removal from the positions they held.

Attempts were made to steer the attention of the general public away from the student movement and advocacy for social reform, centered around the defense of freedom of speech for intellectuals and artists and the right to criticize the regime and its policies. Moczar, the leader of the hardline Stalinist faction of the party, blamed the student protests on "Zionists" and used the protest activity as a pretext for a larger antisemitic campaign (officially described as "anti-Zionist") and party purges. In reality, the student and intellectual protests were generally not related to Zionism or other Jewish issues. The propagated idea of the "Zionist inspiration" of student rebellion originated in part from the presence of children of Jewish communists among those contesting the political order, including especially members of the Komandosi group. To augment their numbers, figures of speech such as the "Michniks, Szlajfers, Zambrowskis" were used. The national strike call from Warsaw (13 March) opposed both antisemitism and Zionism. One banner hung at a Rzeszów high school on 27 April read: "We hail our Zionist comrades."

However, Gomułka warned that "Zionism and antisemitism are two sides of the same nationalist medal" and insisted that communism rejects all forms of nationalism. According to Gomułka, who rejected the Western allegations of antisemitism, "Official circles in the United States have involved themselves in the dirty anti-Polish campaign by making statements accusing Poland of antisemitism. We propose that the ruling circles in the United States check whether American citizens of Polish descent have ever had or have now the same opportunities that Polish citizens of Jewish descent have for good living conditions and education and for occupying positions of responsibility. Then it would emerge clearly who might accuse whom of national discrimination." He went on to say that "the Western Zionist centers that today charge us with antisemitism failed to lift a finger when Hitler's genocide policies exterminated Jews in subjugated Poland, punishing Poles who hid and helped the Jews with death." The party leader was responding to a wave of Western criticism and took advantage of some published reports that were incompatible with the Polish collective memory of historical events, World War II and the Holocaust in particular.

The Moczar challenge, often presented in terms of competing political visions (he was the informal head of the nationalist communist party faction known as "the Partisans"), reflected, according to historian Andrzej Chojnowski, primarily a push for a generational change in the party leadership and at other levels, throughout the country. By 1968 Gomułka, whose public relations skills were poor, was unpopular and had lost touch with the population he ruled. Personnel changes, resisted by Gomułka, were generally desired and expected, and in the party, General Moczar was the alternative. Large numbers of generally younger functionaries mobilized behind him, motivated by the potential opportunity to advance their stagnant careers. Finding scapegoats (possibly by just claiming that someone was enthusiastic about the Israeli victory) and becoming their replacements meant in 1968 progress in that direction. The Moczar faction's activity was one of the major factors that contributed to the 1968 uproar, but the overdue generational change within the party materialized fully only when Edward Gierek replaced Gomułka in December 1970. Moczar himself campaigned ruthlessly in an ultimately failed attempt to become Gomułka's replacement or successor.

== Emigration of Polish citizens of Jewish origin ==
In a parliamentary speech on 11 April 1968, Prime Minister Cyrankiewicz spelled out the government's official position: "Loyalty to socialist Poland and imperialist Israel is not possible simultaneously. ... Whoever wants to face these consequences in the form of emigration will not encounter any obstacle." The departing had their Polish citizenship revoked.

Historian David Engel of the YIVO Institute wrote: "The Interior Ministry compiled a card index of all Polish citizens of Jewish origin, even those who had been detached from organized Jewish life for generations. Jews were removed from jobs in public service, including from teaching positions in schools and universities. The pressure was placed upon them to leave the country by bureaucratic actions aimed at undermining their sources of livelihood and sometimes even by physical brutality." According to Dariusz Stola of the Polish Academy of Sciences, "the term 'anti-Zionist campaign' is misleading in two ways since the campaign began as an anti-Israeli policy but quickly turned into an antisemitic campaign, and this evident anti-Jewish character remained its distinctive feature". The propaganda equated Jewish origins with Zionist sympathies and thus disloyalty to communist Poland. Antisemitic slogans were used in rallies. Prominent Jews, supposedly of Zionist beliefs, including academics, managers and journalists, lost their jobs. According to the Polish state's Institute of National Remembrance (IPN), which investigated events that took place in 1968–69 in Łodź, "in each case the decision of dismissal was preceded by a party resolution about expelling from the party".

According to Jonathan Ornstein, of the 3.5 million Polish Jews prior to World War II, 350,000 or fewer remained after the Holocaust. Most survivors who claimed their Jewish nationality status at the end of World War II, including those who registered with the Central Committee of Polish Jews in 1945, had emigrated from postwar Poland already in its first years of existence. According to David Engel's estimates, of the fewer than 281,000 Jews present in Poland at different times before July 1946, only about 90,000 were left in the country by the middle of 1947. Fewer than 80,000 remained by 1951, when the government prohibited emigration to Israel. An additional 30,000 arrived from the Soviet Union in 1957, but almost 50,000, typically people actively expressing Jewish identity, left Poland in 1957–1959, under Gomułka and with his government's encouragement. This emigration is also referred as "Gomułka aliyah". Approximately 25,000–30,000 Jews lived in Poland by 1967. As a group, they had become increasingly assimilated and secular and had well-developed and functioning Jewish secular institutions. Of the Jews who stayed in Poland, many did so for political and career reasons. Their situation changed after the 1967 Arab–Israeli war and the 1968 Polish academic revolt when the Jews were used as scapegoats by the warring party factions and pressured to emigrate en masse once more. According to Engel, some 25,000 Jews left Poland during the 1968–70 period, leaving only between 5,000 and 10,000 Jews in the country. Some 11,200 Jews from Poland immigrated to Israel during 1968 and 1969.

From the end of World War II, the Soviet-imposed government in Poland, lacking strong popular support, found it expedient to depend disproportionately on Jews for performing clerical and administrative jobs and many Jews rose to high positions within the political and internal security ranks. Consequently, as noted by historian Michael C. Steinlauf – "their group profile ever more closely resembled the mythic Żydokomuna" (see also Jewish Bolshevism). For complex historical reasons, Jews held many positions of repressive authority under the post-war Polish communist administrations. In March 1968, some of those officials became the center of an organized campaign to equate Jewish origins with Stalinist sympathies and crimes. The political purges, often ostensibly directed at functionaries of the Stalinist era, affected all Polish Jews regardless of background.

Prior to the 1967–68 events, Polish-Jewish relations had been a taboo subject in communist Poland. Available information was limited to the dissemination of shallow and distorted official versions of historical events, while much of the traditional social antisemitic resentment was brewing under the surface, despite the scarcity of Jewish targets. Popular antisemitism of the post-war years was closely linked to anticommunist and anti-Soviet attitudes and as such was resisted by the authorities. Because of this historically right-wing orientation of Polish antisemitism, the Jews generally felt safe in communist Poland and experienced a "March shock" when many in the ruling regime adopted the antisemitic views of pre-war Polish nationalists to justify an application of aggressive propaganda and psychological terror. The outwardly Stalinist character of the campaign was paradoxically combined with anti-Stalinist and anti-Żydokomuna rhetoric. The media "exposed" various past and present Jewish conspiracies directed against socialist Poland, often using prejudicial Jewish stereotypes, which supposedly added up to a grand Jewish anti-Polish scheme. West German-Israeli and American-Zionist anti-Poland blocs were also "revealed". In Poland, it was claimed, the old Jewish Stalinists were secretly preparing their own return to power, to thwart the Polish October gains. The small number of Jews remaining in Poland were subjected to unbearable pressures generated by the state monopolistic media, often dominated by sympathizers of Minister Moczar. Many Jews and non-Jews were smeared and removed by their local Basic Party Organizations (POP), after which they had to be fired from their jobs. Many professionals and non-members of the party fell victim as well.

Most of the last wave (1968–69) of emigrants chose destinations other than Israel, which contradicted the government's claim of their pro-Israeli devotion. Disproportionately in Polish society, they represented highly educated, professional, and accomplished people. Some communist party activists had previously perceived this factor as an undue "density" of Jews in positions of importance, a remnant of Stalinist times, which resulted in calls for their marginalization and removal from the country.

Over a thousand former hardline Stalinists of Jewish origin left Poland in and after 1968, among them former prosecutor Helena Wolińska-Brus and judge Stefan Michnik. The IPN had investigated Stalinist crimes committed by some of the March 1968 emigrants including Michnik, who settled in Sweden, and Wolińska-Brus, who resided in the United Kingdom. Both were accused of being an "accessory to a court murder". Applications were made for their extradition based on the European Arrest Warrants.

Between 1961 and 1967, the average rate of Jewish emigration from Poland was 500–900 persons per year. In 1968, a total of 3,900 Jews applied to leave the country. Between January and August 1969, the number of emigrating Jews was almost 7,300, all according to records of the Ministry of Internal Affairs. The security organs maintained comprehensive data on persons with "family background in Israel" or of Jewish origin, including those dismissed from their positions and those who did not hold any official positions but applied for emigration to Israel.

== Termination of the anti-Zionist campaign ==
On 11 April 1968, Secretary of the Central Committee Artur Starewicz gave Gomułka a comprehensive letter, in which he pointed out the destructiveness of the demagoguery, anti-Jewish obsession and other aspects of the campaign. In late April Gomułka realized that the campaign he allowed had outlived its usefulness and was getting out of control; many participants became overzealous and complaints from various quarters multiplied. However, ending it and restoring normal party control and discipline took several weeks of repeated warnings and other efforts. On 24 June, Gomułka sharply criticized Stefan Olszowski, the party propaganda chief and the role played by the PAX publications. Both were heavily involved in the "anti-Zionist", but also "nationalistic" media campaign from 11 March. On 1 July, Leopold Domb (Leopold Trepper), former chairman of the Sociocultural Association of Jews (in Poland), wrote a letter to his party boss Gomułka. Domb bitterly complained of the progressive liquidation of the thousand years of Polish-Jewish civilizational achievement and listed numerous instances of such destruction of society and culture taking place in contemporary communist Poland.

On 5 July, Gomułka acknowledged "certain problems" with the Ministry of Internal Affairs and announced the removal of Minister Moczar from the cabinet position, which disconnected him from his power base at that department. Moczar's sidelining was presented as a promotion: he became secretary of the Central Committee and a deputy member of the Politburo. "Comrade Moczar is a disciplined man and he'll do as he is told", was how Gomułka saw the resolution. Gomułka's ability to decisively dismantle the Internal Affairs' anti-Jewish smear campaign and punish its perpetrators (for challenging the party leadership) shows that he could have done so earlier, had he chosen to act in a timely manner. During the XII Plenum of the Central Committee (8–9 July), Zenon Kliszko officially closed the "anti-Zionist" campaign. Internal attacks and obstruction within the party, the military and the security services (SB), now directed against Gomułka and Kliszko, continued for some time. In reality, SB's "anti-Zionist" activities were never completely abandoned. During 1970–80, General Jaruzelski demoted to the rank of private 1,348 Jewish officers who had emigrated, not only around 1968. Such continued activities were conducted in secret.

The media propaganda machine was by early summer preoccupied with denouncing the Prague Spring. In August, the Polish People's Army participated in the Warsaw Pact invasion of Czechoslovakia.

== Consequences of the events of 1968 ==
The Fifth Congress of the PZPR took place in November, under Gomułka' s active lead. His position was confirmed. The gathering, numerically dominated by the supporters of Moczar, was maneuvered into complying with Gomułka faction's personnel decisions. The party now had 2.1 million members (only 40% were workers), after the recent purging of over 230,000. The Jewish activists were gone, but many other veterans remained, as the generational change in the communist leadership was beginning to take place. Gomułka was able to rule with his few close associates until December 1970, but his prestige suffered in Poland, abroad, and among the Soviet and other Eastern Bloc leaders.

A consequence of the protest events and their repercussions was the alienation of the regime from the leftist intelligentsia, who were disgusted at the official promotion of antisemitism and the adoption of nationalistic rhetoric. Many Polish intellectuals opposed the government campaign, often openly. Another effect was the activity by Polish emigrants to the West in organizations that encouraged opposition within Poland.

The alienation of Polish intelligentsia had a long afterlife and eventually contributed to the downfall of the communist dictatorship: the 1968 events were a turning point in the ideological evolution of those who would challenge the system in the years to come. Jacek Kuroń, for example, twice a party member and an activist imprisoned for his participation in the 1968 events, later played important roles in the Workers' Defence Committee and the Solidarity workers' movement. The events of 1968, preceded by those in 1956 and followed by those of 1970, 1976 and 1980, showed that Poland, with its strong nationalist traditions, a civil society, and the powerful Catholic Church, was the source of instability and weakness in the Eastern Bloc. The dangers presented to the PZPR by the "reactionary" coalition of 1968, against which some had already warned back then, turned out not to be imaginary, but their realization took another two decades.

The antisemitic, anti-intellectual and anti-student campaign damaged Poland's reputation, particularly in the West. Despite the worldwide condemnation of the March 1968 repressions, for many years the communist governments would not admit the antisemitic nature of the "anti-Zionist" campaign, though some newspapers published critical articles. In February and March 1988, the Polish communist government announced official apologies for the antisemitic excesses of 1968: first in Israel at a conference on Polish Jewry, and then in a statement printed in Trybuna Ludu. A Central Committee report even suggested an introduction of dual citizenship to improve relations with the Jews who left Poland.

== Aftermath ==
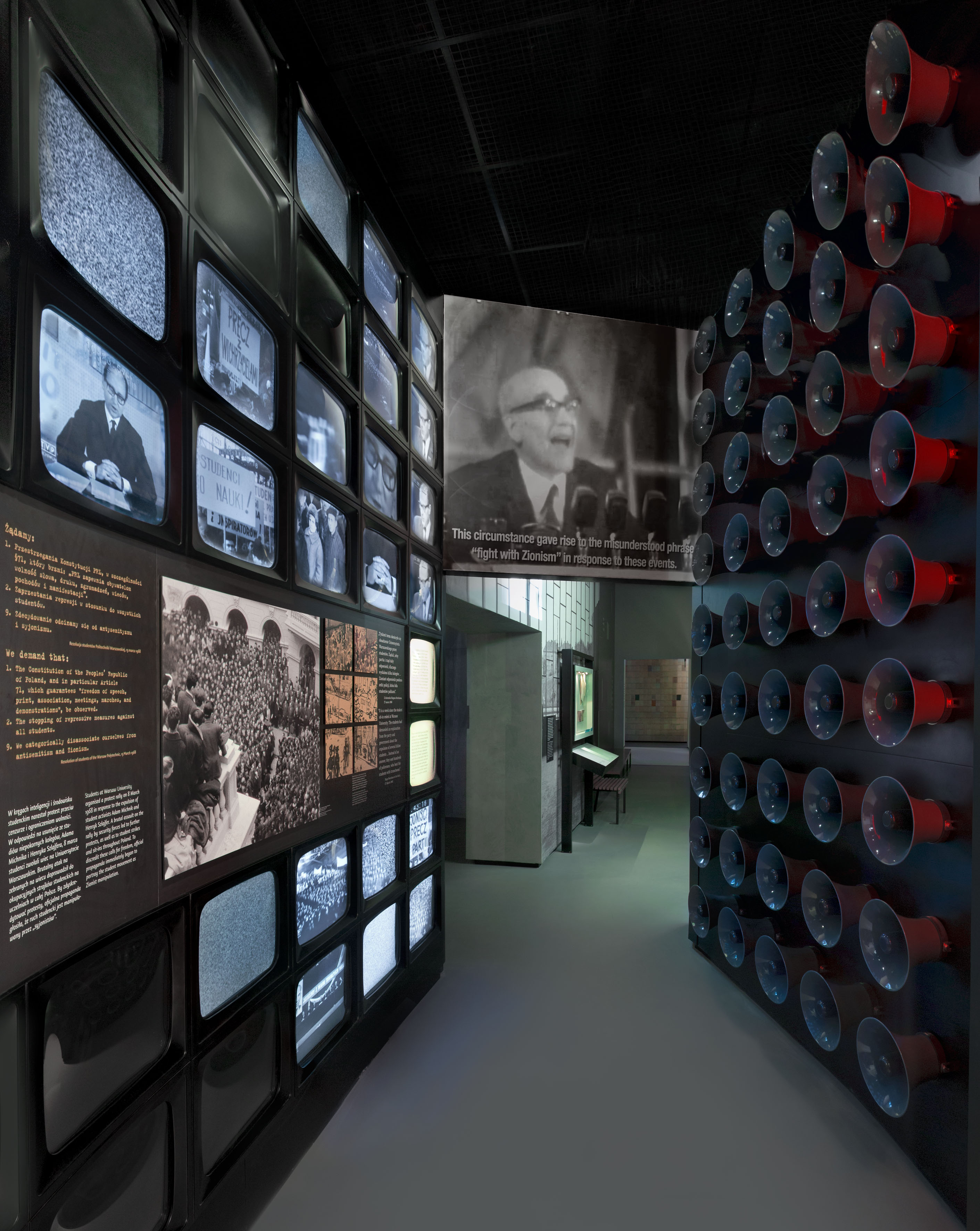
Part of a permanent exhibition dedicated to the March events at the POLIN Museum of the History of Polish Jews in Warsaw

After the fall of the communist rule, the Sejm in 1998 issued an official condemnation of the antisemitism of the March 1968 events. In 2000, President Aleksander Kwaśniewski gave his own apology in front of a group of Jewish students "as the president of Poland and as a Pole".

On the 30th anniversary of their departures, a memorial plaque was placed at Warszawa Gdańska train station, from which most of the exiled Poles took a train to Vienna.

In March 2018 Polish President Andrzej Duda said "We are sorry you're not here today" and "those were deported then and the families of those who were killed – I want to say, please forgive Poland for that" in relation to the 20,000 Jews expelled or forced to flee in 1968. However, Duda said that his generation was not responsible for the actions of the past communist administration. Duda's distinction between the past Polish government whom he framed as culpable, and Polish citizens whom he framed as innocent, was seen as a non-apology by critics. Duda's statement also echoed Jewish stereotypes in framing the loss to Poland: "You are the elite of the intelligentsia but in other countries, you are people of remarkable success, respected, but in other countries, your creative powers, your scientific output, your splendid achievements have not done credit to the Republic of Poland".

== See also ==
- Expulsions and exoduses of Jews
- Judaeo-Bolshevism
- Anti-Jewish violence in Central and Eastern Europe, 1944–1946
- Timeline of antisemitism in the 20th century
- Slánský trial
- Doctors' plot
- History of the Jews in Poland
- Operation Treblinka
- Protests of 1968
- Puławianie

== Notes ==
a. The following was written in 1968 by Andrzej Werblan, a PZPR publicist: "... a peculiar political alliance of several reactionary tendencies ... political pedigrees of the most aggressive speakers of the extraordinary general meeting of the Warsaw Chapter of the ZLP on 29 February 1968. Here are the representative figures of this political alliance: January Grzędziński – a Piłsudskiite, Stefan Kisielewski – a representative of backward Catholic circles, Paweł Jasienica – an active participant of the reactionary underground from 20 years ago, Antoni Słonimski – connected with cosmopolitan and Zionist coteries, Leszek Kołakowski – removed from the PZPR ranks for extremely revisionist views and activities a year and a half ago."
