= Warsaw Uprising =

Major World War II operation by the Polish resistance Home Army

- Part of Operation Tempest of the Polish Resistance and the Eastern Front of World War II
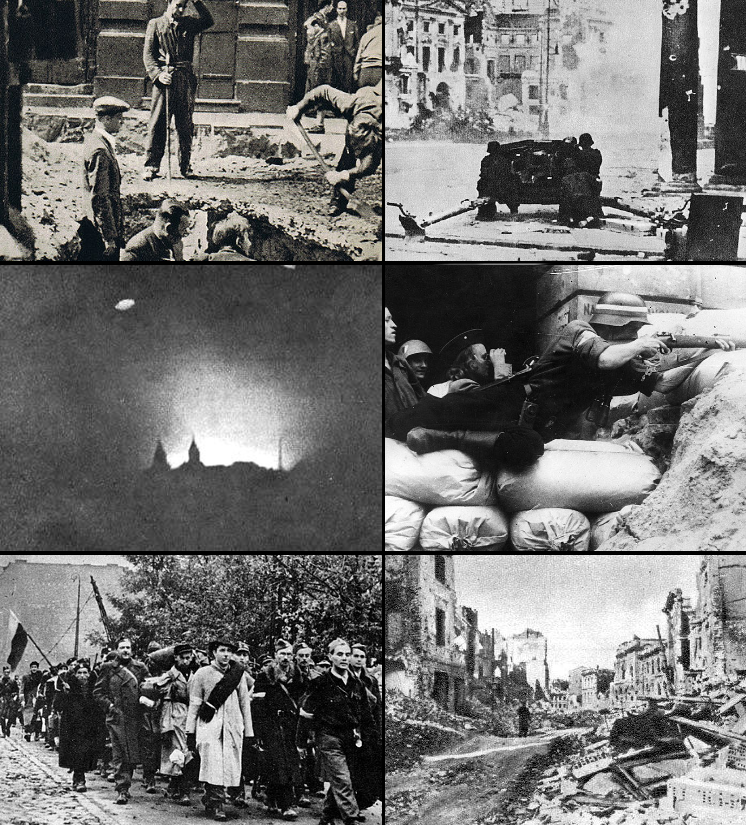
- Clockwise from top left: Civilians construct an anti-tank ditch in Wola district; German anti-tank gun in Theatre Square; Home Army soldier defending a barricade; Ruins of Bielańska Street; Insurgents leave the city ruins after surrendering to German forces; Allied transport planes airdrop supplies near Holy Cross Church.
Date	1 August – 2 October 1944 (63 days)
Location	Warsaw, Poland 52°13′56″N 20°58′51″E
Result	German victory: Surrender of Warsaw Home Army (see capitulation agreement)
Territorial changes	Soviet Lublin–Brest Offensive halted; 80–90% of Warsaw destroyed

Belligerents
Polish Underground State: Home Army; Polish Army in the East (from 14 September) Supported by: United Kingdom (4 August – 21 September); United States (only on 18 September); South Africa; Soviet Union (limited aid)	Germany: General Government

Commanders and leaders
(Polish Underground State) T. Komorowski (POW) (Polish Underground State) Tadeusz Pełczyński (POW) (Polish Underground State) Antoni Chruściel (POW) (Polish Underground State) Karol Ziemski (POW) (Polish Underground State) Edward Pfeiffer (POW) (Polish Underground State) Leopold Okulicki (Polish Underground State) Jan Mazurkiewicz; Zygmunt Berling	(Nazi Germany) Walter Model (Nazi Germany) Nikolaus von Vormann (Nazi Germany) Rainer Stahel (Nazi Germany) E. v.d. Bach-Zelewski (Nazi Germany) Heinz Reinefarth (Nazi Germany) Bronisław Kaminski (executed) (Nazi Germany) Oskar Dirlewanger (Nazi Germany) Robert von Greim (Nazi Germany) Paul Otto Geibel

Units involved
Home Army: City Center – North; City Center – South; Powiśle; Warsaw – North; Żoliborz; Kampinos Forest; Warsaw – South; Kedyw Units; (Poland) Polish First Army Warsaw Airlift: (United Kingdom) Royal Air Force (including Polish squadrons) (United States) US Army Air Force (South Africa) South African Air Force (Soviet Union) Soviet Air Force	(Nazi Germany) Warsaw Garrison; Kampfgruppe Rohr; Sturmbrigade RONA; Kampfgruppe Reinefarth; Sturmbrigade Reck; Sturmbrigade Schmidt; Sturmbrigade Dirlewanger; Schutzpolizei; Supported by: Luftwaffe

Strength
20,000–49,000; 2,500 equipped with guns (initially); 2 captured Panther tanks 1 captured Hetzer tank destroyer 2 captured armoured personnel carriers Improvised armored vehicles Warsaw Airlift: (United States) US Army Air Force: 107 B-17s; P-51 Mustangs	13,000–25,000 (initially); Dozens of tanks Luftwaffe: 6 Junkers Ju 87s

Casualties and losses
Polish resistance: 15,200 killed and missing 5,000 wounded in action 15,000 POW (incl. capitulation agreement); Polish First Army: 5,660 casualties Warsaw Airlift: 41 aircraft destroyed	German forces: 2,000–17,000 killed and missing 9,000 wounded in action Multiple tanks and armored vehicles
- 150,000–200,000 civilians killed 700,000 expelled from the city

The Warsaw Uprising (Polish: powstanie warszawskie; German: Warschauer Aufstand), sometimes referred to as the August Uprising (Polish: powstanie sierpniowe), or the Battle of Warsaw, was a major World War II operation by the Polish underground resistance to liberate Warsaw from German occupation. It occurred in the summer of 1944, and it was led by the Polish resistance Home Army (Polish: Armia Krajowa). The uprising was timed to coincide with the retreat of the German forces from Poland ahead of the Soviet advance. While approaching the eastern suburbs of the city, the Red Army halted combat operations, enabling the Germans to regroup and defeat the Polish resistance and to destroy the city in retaliation. The Uprising was fought for 63 days with little outside support. It was the single largest military effort taken by any European resistance movement during World War II. The defeat of the uprising and suppression of the Home Army enabled the pro-Soviet Polish administration, instead of the Polish government-in-exile based in London, to take control of Poland afterwards. Poland remained part of the Soviet-aligned Eastern Bloc throughout the Cold War until 1989.

The Uprising began on 1 August 1944 as part of a nationwide Operation Tempest, launched at the time of the Soviet Lublin–Brest Offensive. The main Polish objectives were to drive the Germans out of Warsaw while helping the Allies defeat Germany. An additional, political goal of the Polish Underground State was to liberate Poland's capital and assert Polish sovereignty before the Soviet Union and Soviet-backed Polish Committee of National Liberation, which already controlled eastern Poland, could assume control. Other immediate causes included a threat of mass German round-ups of able-bodied Poles for "evacuation"; calls by Radio Moscow's Polish Service for uprising; and an emotional Polish desire for justice and revenge against the enemy after five years of German occupation.

Despite the early gains by the Home Army, the Germans successfully counterattacked on 25 August, in an attack that killed as many as 40,000 civilians. The uprising was now in a siege phase which favored the better-equipped Germans and eventually the Home Army surrendered on 2 October when their supplies ran out. The Germans then deported the remaining civilians and razed the city itself.

While the Germans lost around 16,000 men during the Warsaw Uprising, Polish casualties were catastrophic. Although the exact number of casualties is unknown, it is estimated that about 16,000 members of the Polish resistance were killed and about 6,000 badly wounded. In addition, between 150,000 and 200,000 Polish civilians died, mostly from mass executions. Jews being harboured by Poles were exposed by German house-to-house clearances and mass evictions of entire neighbourhoods.

Historians and the public have debated and interpreted the impact of the Uprising in a wide range of ways, including as a deeply heroic effort and as a terrible loss with little gain. Polish and Western historians agree that Joseph Stalin tactically halted his forces from advancing on Warsaw in order to exhaust the Polish Home Army and to aid his political desires of turning Poland into a Soviet-aligned state. Some scholars argue that the two-month period of the Warsaw Uprising was a step in the direction of the Cold War.

== Background ==
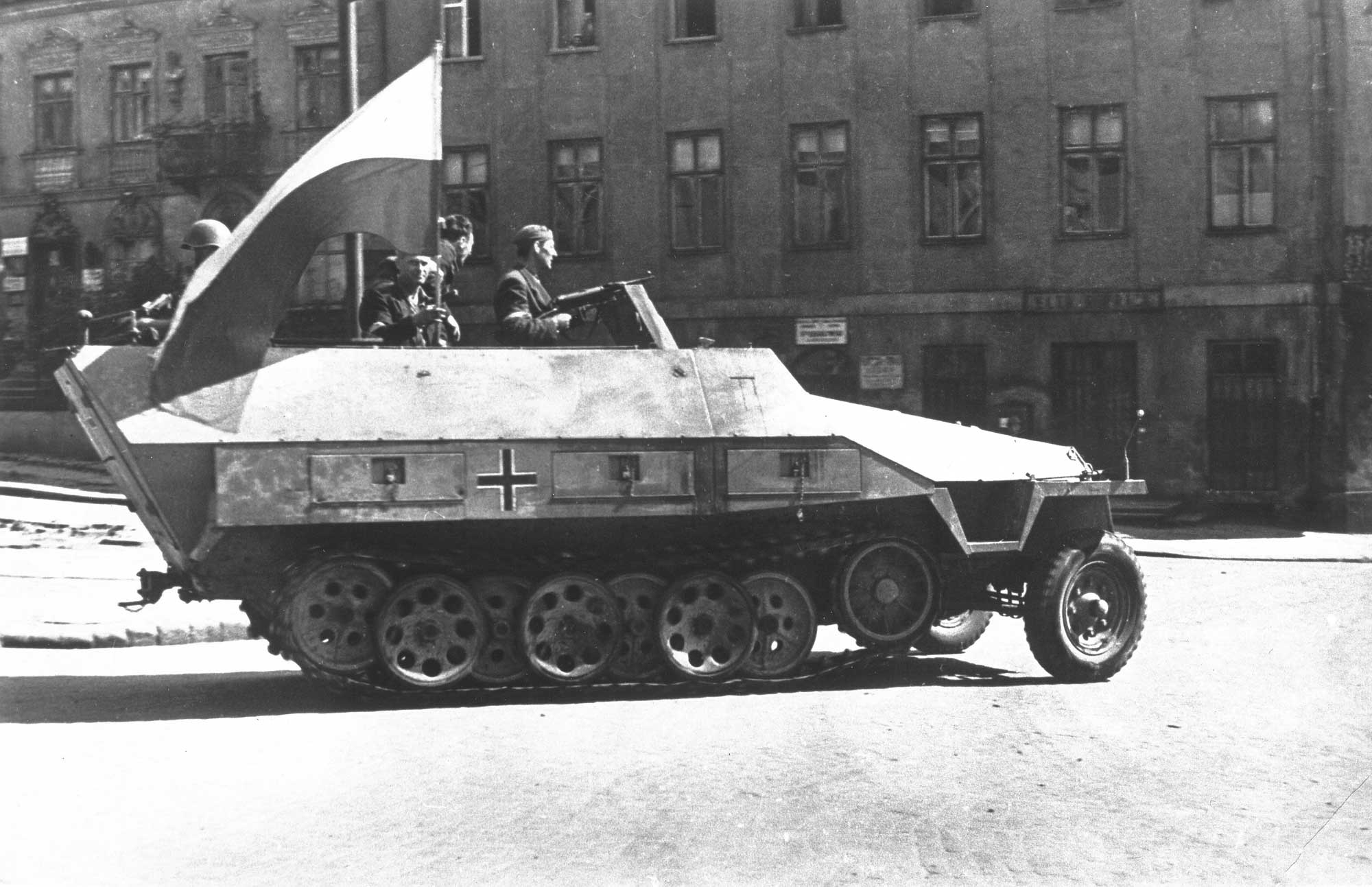
A captured German Sd.Kfz. 251 from the 5th SS Panzer Division, being used by the 8th "Krybar" Regiment. Furthest right; commander Adam Dewicz "Grey Wolf", 14 August 1944.

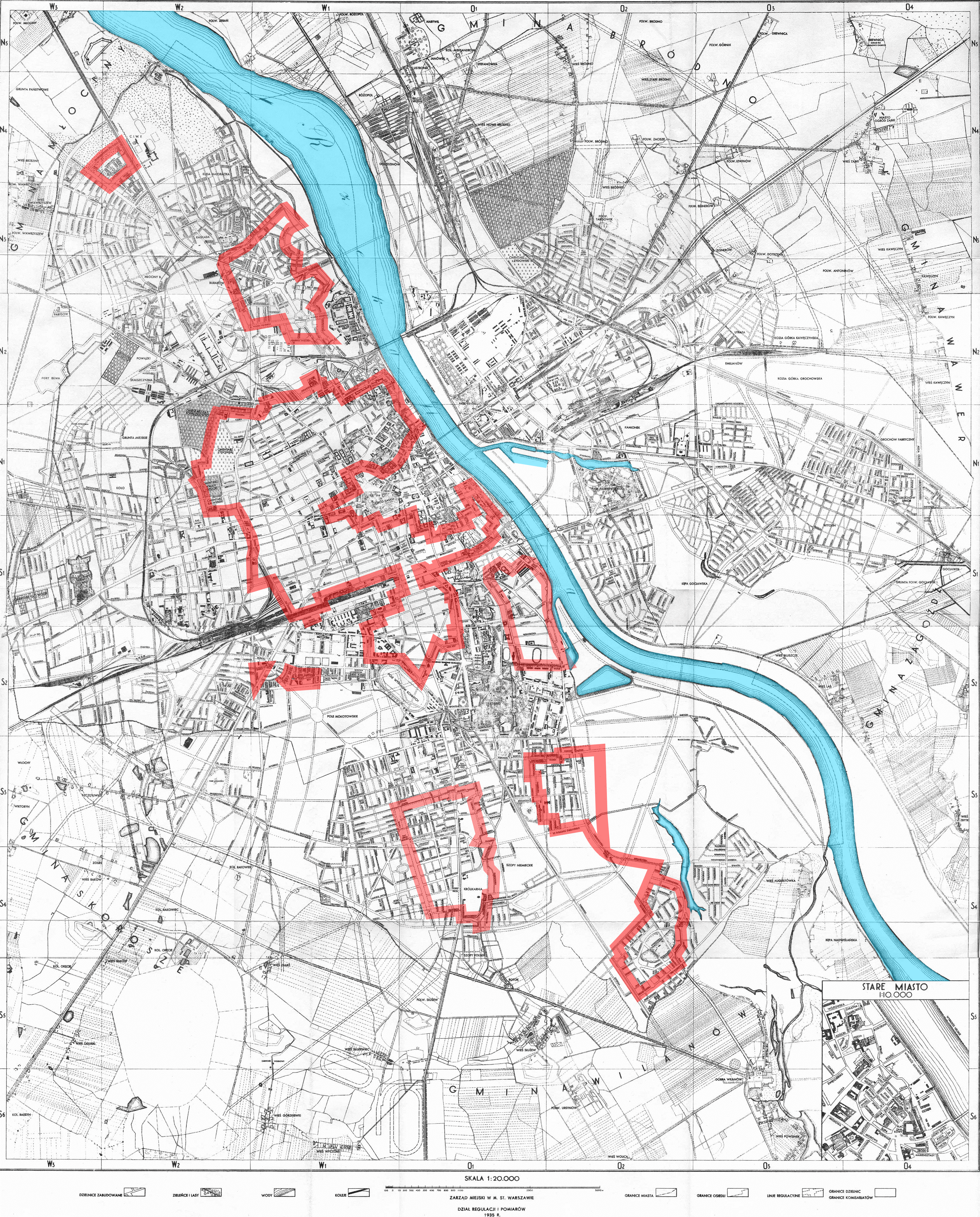
Polish Home Army positions, outlined in red, on the western bank of the Vistula (4 August 1944)

In 1944, Poland had been occupied by Nazi Germany for almost five years. The Polish Home Army planned some form of rebellion against German forces. Germany was fighting a coalition of Allied powers, led by the Soviet Union, the United Kingdom and the United States. The initial plan of the Home Army was to link up with the invading forces of the Western Allies as they liberated Europe from the Nazis. However, when the Soviet Army began its offensive in 1943, it became clear that Poland would be liberated by it instead of the Western Allies.

In this country, we have one point from which every evil emanates. That point is Warsaw. If we didn't have Warsaw in the General Government, we wouldn't have four-fifths of the difficulties with which we must contend. – German Governor-General Hans Frank, Kraków, 14 December 1943

The Soviets and the Poles had a common enemy – Germany – but were working towards different post-war goals: the Home Army desired a pro-Western, capitalist Poland, but the Soviet leader Stalin intended to establish a pro-Soviet, socialist Poland. It became obvious that the advancing Soviet Red Army might not come to Poland as an ally but rather only as "the ally of an ally".

The Home Commander was, in his political thinking, pledged to the doctrine of two enemies, in accordance with which both Germany and Russia were seen as Poland's traditional enemies, and it was expected that support for Poland, if any, would come from the West.

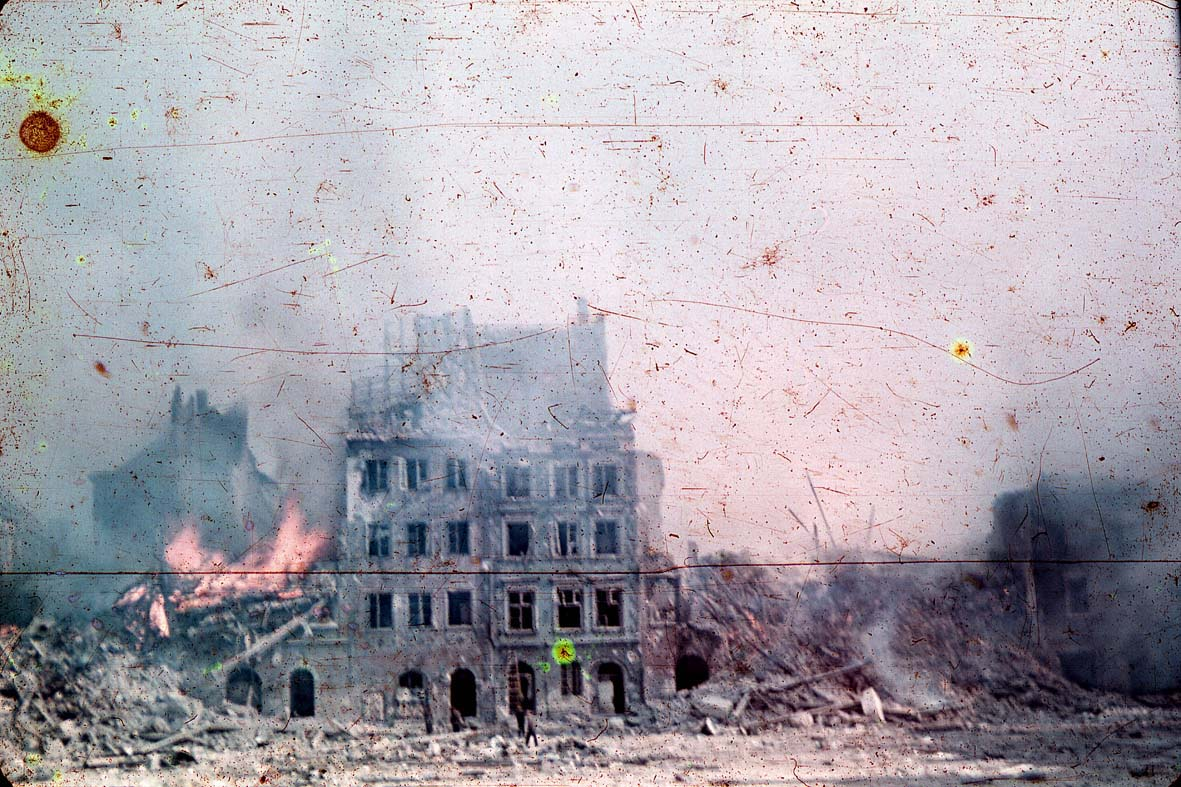
The Old Town in flames during the Warsaw Uprising

The Soviets and the Poles distrusted each other and Soviet partisans in Poland often clashed with a Polish resistance increasingly united under the Home Army's front. Stalin broke off Polish–Soviet relations on 25 April 1943 after the Germans revealed the Katyn massacre of Polish army officers, and Stalin refused to admit to ordering the killings and denounced the claims as German propaganda. Afterwards, Stalin created the Rudenko Commission, whose goal was to blame the Germans for the war crime at all costs. The Western alliance accepted Stalin's words as truth in order to keep the anti-Nazi alliance intact. On 26 October, the Polish government-in-exile issued instructions to the effect that, if diplomatic relations with the Soviet Union were not resumed before the Soviet entry into Poland, Home Army forces were to remain underground pending further decisions.

However, the Home Army commander, Tadeusz Bór-Komorowski, took a different approach, and on 20 November, he outlined his own plan, which became known as Operation Tempest. On the approach of the Eastern Front, local units of the Home Army were to harass the German Wehrmacht in the rear and co-operate with incoming Soviet units as much as possible. Although doubts existed about the military necessity of a major uprising, planning continued. General Bór-Komorowski and his civilian advisor were authorised by the government in exile to proclaim a general uprising whenever they saw fit.

== Eve of the battle ==
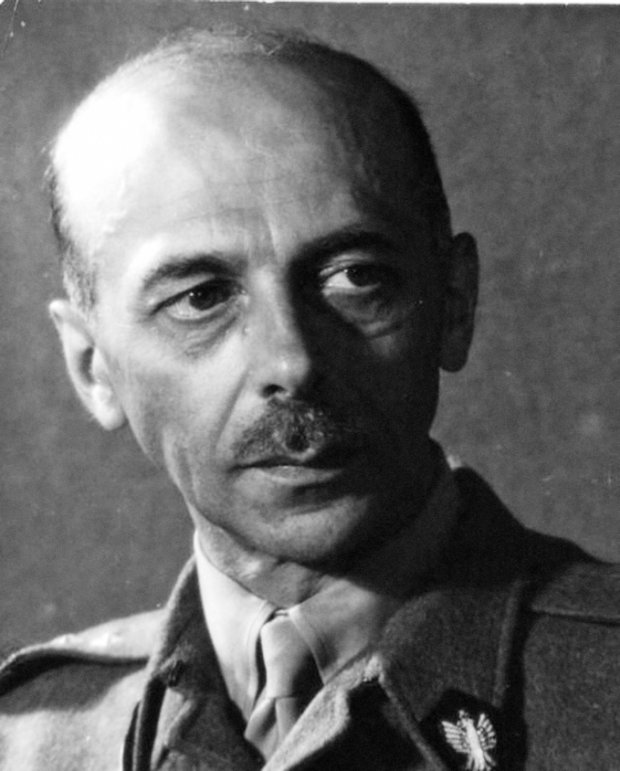
Tadeusz Bór-Komorowski, commander of the Polish Home Army

The situation came to a head on 13 July 1944 as the Soviet offensive crossed the old Polish border. At this point, the Poles had to make a decision: either initiate the uprising in the current difficult political situation and risk a lack of Soviet support, or fail to rebel and face Soviet propaganda describing the Home Army as impotent or worse, Nazi collaborators. They feared that if Poland was liberated by the Red Army, then the Allies would ignore the London-based Polish government in the aftermath of the war. The urgency for a final decision on strategy increased as it became clear that, after successful Polish-Soviet co-operation in the liberation of Polish territory (for example, in Operation Ostra Brama), Soviet security forces behind the frontline shot or arrested Polish officers and forcibly conscripted lower ranks into the Soviet-controlled forces. On 21 July, the High Command of the Home Army decided that the time to launch Operation Tempest in Warsaw was imminent. The plan was intended both as a political manifestation of Polish sovereignty and as a direct operation against the German occupiers. On 25 July, the Polish government-in-exile (without the knowledge and against the wishes of Polish Commander-in-Chief General Kazimierz Sosnkowski) approved the plan for an uprising in Warsaw with the timing to be decided locally.

In the early summer of 1944, German plans required Warsaw to serve as the defensive centre of the area and to be held at all costs. The Germans had fortifications constructed and built up their forces in the area. This process slowed after the failed 20 July plot to assassinate the Nazi leader Adolf Hitler, and around that time, the Germans in Warsaw were weak and visibly demoralized. However, by the end of July, German forces in the area were reinforced. On 27 July, the governor of the Warsaw District, Ludwig Fischer, called for 100,000 Polish men and women to report for work as part of a plan which envisaged the Poles constructing fortifications around the city. The inhabitants of Warsaw ignored his demand, and the Home Army command became worried about possible reprisals or mass round-ups, which would disable their ability to mobilize. The Soviet forces were approaching Warsaw, and Soviet-controlled radio stations called for the Polish people to rise in arms.

On 25 July, the Union of Polish Patriots, in a broadcast from Moscow, stated:

The Polish Army of Polish Patriots ... calls on the thousands of brothers thirsting to fight, to smash the foe before he can recover from his defeat ... Every Polish homestead must become a stronghold in the struggle against the invaders ... Not a moment is to be lost.

On 29 July, the first Soviet armoured units reached the outskirts of Warsaw, where they were counter-attacked by two German Panzer Corps: the 39th and 4th SS. On 29 July 1944, Radio Station Kosciuszko located in Moscow emitted a few times its "Appeal to Warsaw" and called to "Fight The Germans!":

No doubt Warsaw already hears the guns of the battle which is soon to bring her liberation. ... The Polish Army now entering Polish territory, trained in the Soviet Union, is now joined to the People's Army to form the Corps of the Polish Armed Forces, the armed arm of our nation in its struggle for independence. Its ranks will be joined tomorrow by the sons of Warsaw. They will all together, with the Allied Army pursue the enemy westwards, wipe out the Hitlerite vermin from Polish land and strike a mortal blow at the beast of Prussian Imperialism.

Bór-Komorowski and several officers held a meeting on that day. Jan Nowak-Jeziorański, who had arrived from London, expressed the view that help from the Allies would be limited, but his views received no attention.

In the early afternoon of 31 July the most important political and military leaders of the resistance had no intention of sending their troops into battle on 1 August. Even so, another late afternoon briefing of Bor-Komorowski's Staff was arranged for five o'clock(...) At about 5.30 p.m. Col 'Monter' arrived at the briefing, reporting that the Russian tanks were already entering Praga and insisting on the immediate launching of the Home Army operations inside the city as otherwise it 'might be too late'. Prompted by 'Monter`s report, Bor-Komorowski decided that the time was ripe for the commencement of 'Burza' in Warsaw, in spite of his earlier conviction to the contrary, twice expressed during the course of that day.

Bor-Komorowski and Jankowski issued their final order for the insurrection when it was erroneously reported to them that the Soviet tanks were entering Praga. Hence they assumed that the Russo-German battle for Warsaw was approaching its climax and that this presented them with an excellent opportunity to capture Warsaw before the Red Army entered the capital. The Soviet radio appeals calling upon the people of Warsaw to rise against the Germans, regardless of Moscow's intentions, had very little influence on the Polish authorities responsible for the insurrection.

Believing that the time for action had arrived, on 31 July, the Polish commanders General Bór-Komorowski and Colonel Antoni Chruściel ordered full mobilization of the forces for 17:00 the following day.

Within the framework of the entire enemy intelligence operations directed against Germany, the intelligence service of the Polish resistance movement assumed major significance. The scope and importance of the operations of the Polish resistance movement, which was ramified down to the smallest splinter group and brilliantly organized, have been in (various sources) disclosed in connection with carrying out of major police security operations.

— Heinrich Himmler, 31 December 1942

== Opposing forces ==
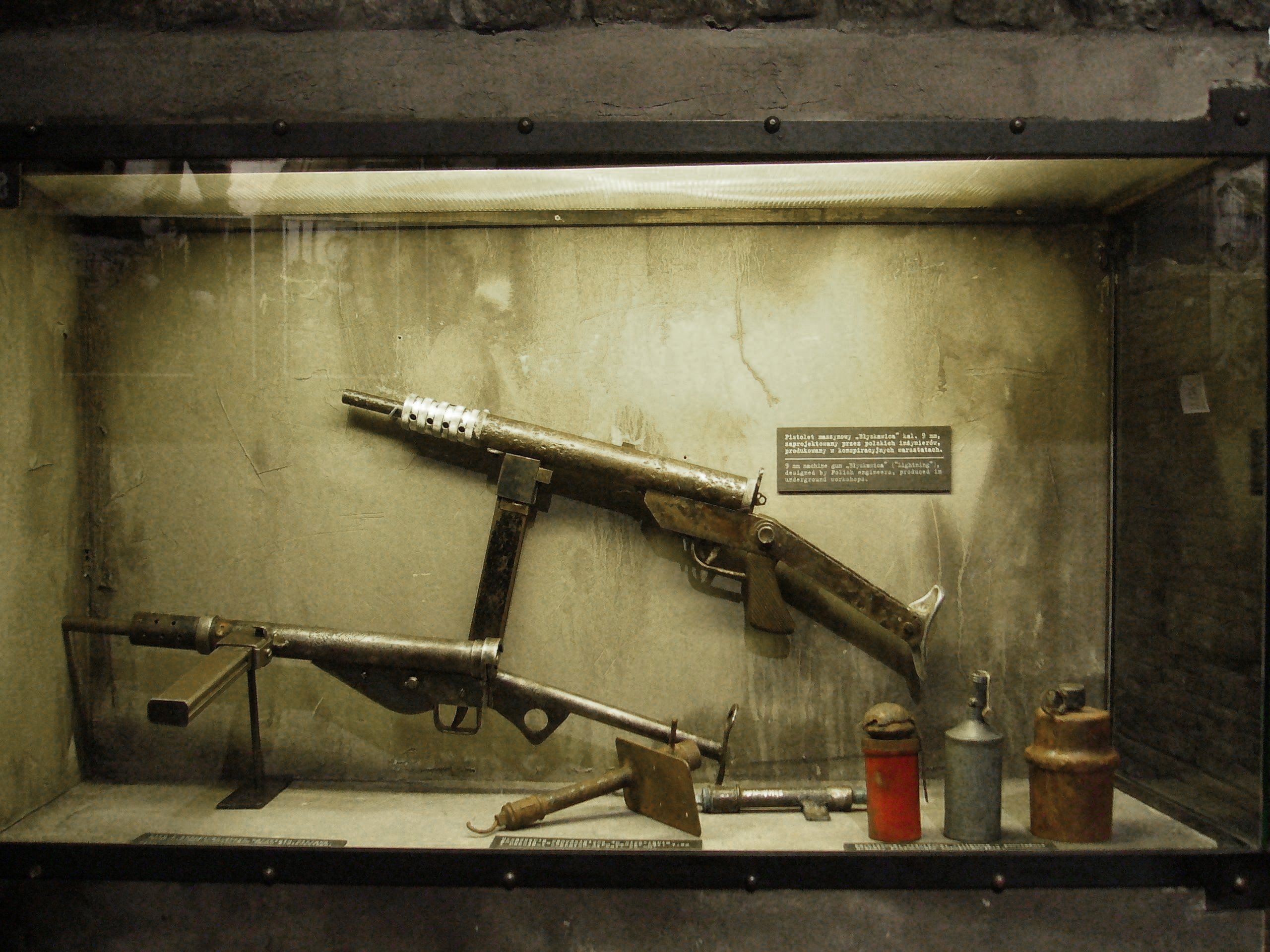
Weapons used by the resistance, including the Błyskawica submachine gun – one of very few weapons designed and mass-produced covertly in occupied Europe.

=== Polish forces ===
The Home Army forces of the Warsaw District numbered between 20,000, and 49,000 soldiers. Other underground formations also contributed; estimates range from 2,000 in total, to about 3,500 men including those from the National Armed Forces and the communist People's Army. Most of them had trained for several years in partisan and urban guerrilla warfare, but lacked experience in prolonged daylight fighting. The forces lacked equipment, because the Home Army had shuttled weapons to the east of the country before the decision to include Warsaw in Operation Tempest. Other partisan groups subordinated themselves to Home Army command, and many volunteers joined during the fighting, including Jews freed from the Gęsiówka concentration camp in the ruins of the Warsaw Ghetto. Morale among Jewish fighters was hurt by displays of antisemitism, with several former Jewish prisoners in combat units even killed by antisemitic Poles.

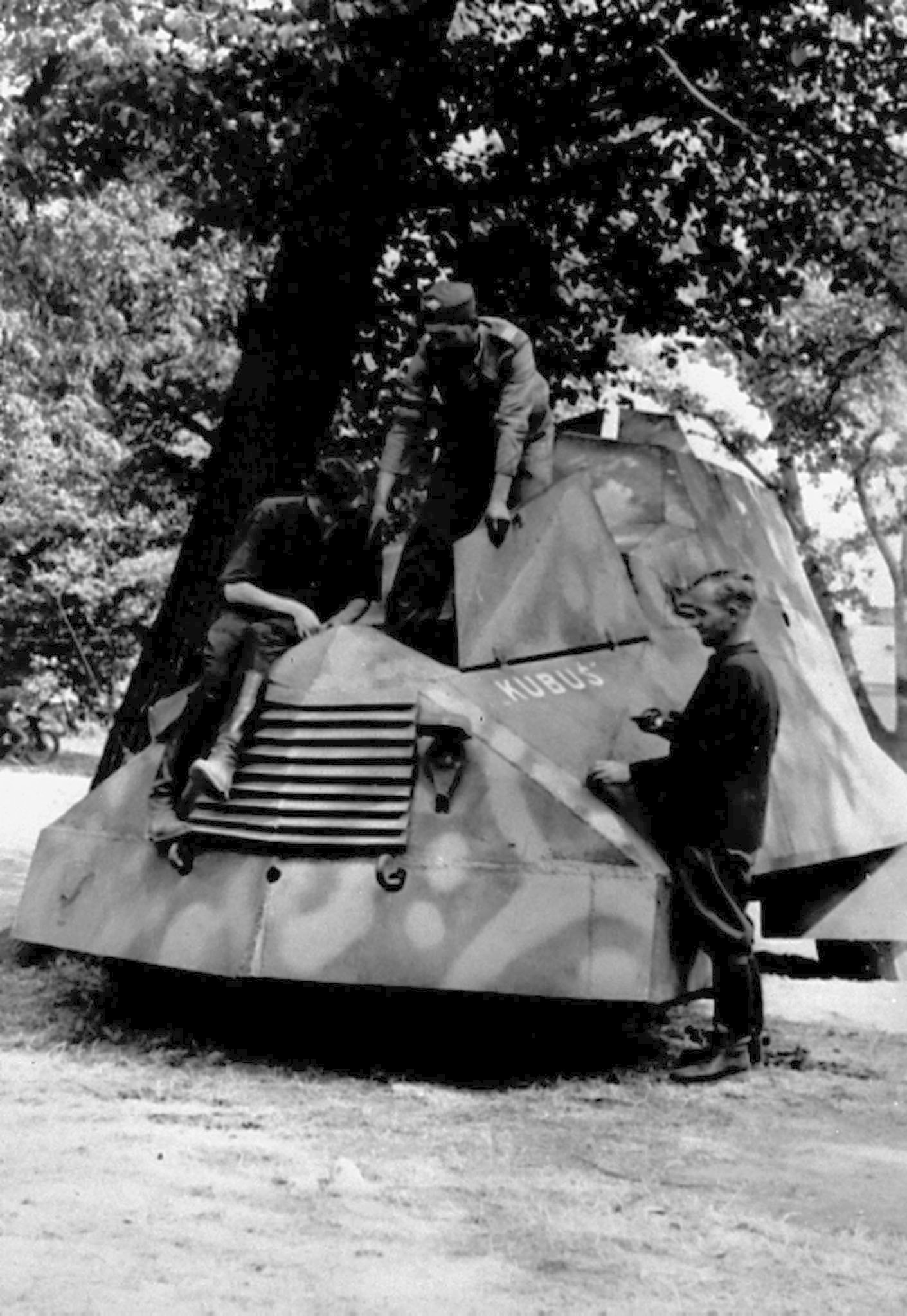
Kubuś, an armoured car made by the Home Army during the Uprising. A single unit was built by the "Krybar" Regiment on the chassis of a Chevrolet 157 van.

Colonel Antoni Chruściel (codename "Monter") who commanded the Polish underground forces in Warsaw, divided his units into eight areas: the Sub-district I of Śródmieście (Area I) which included Warszawa-Śródmieście and the Old Town; the Sub-district II of Żoliborz (Area II) comprising Żoliborz, Marymont, and Bielany; the Sub-district III of Wola (Area III) in Wola; the Sub-district IV of Ochota (Area IV) in Ochota; the Sub-district V of Mokotów (Area V) in Mokotów; the Sub-district VI of Praga (Area VI) in Praga; the Sub-district VII of Warsaw suburbs (Area VII) for the Warsaw West County; and the Autonomous Region VIII of Okęcie (Area VIII) in Okęcie; while the units of the Directorate of Sabotage and Diversion (Kedyw) remained attached to the Uprising Headquarters. On 20 September, the sub-districts were reorganized to align with the three areas of the city held by the Polish units. The entire force, renamed the Warsaw Home Army Corps (Polish: Warszawski Korpus Armii Krajowej) and commanded by General Antoni Chruściel – who was promoted from Colonel on 14 September – formed three infantry divisions (Śródmieście, Żoliborz and Mokotów).

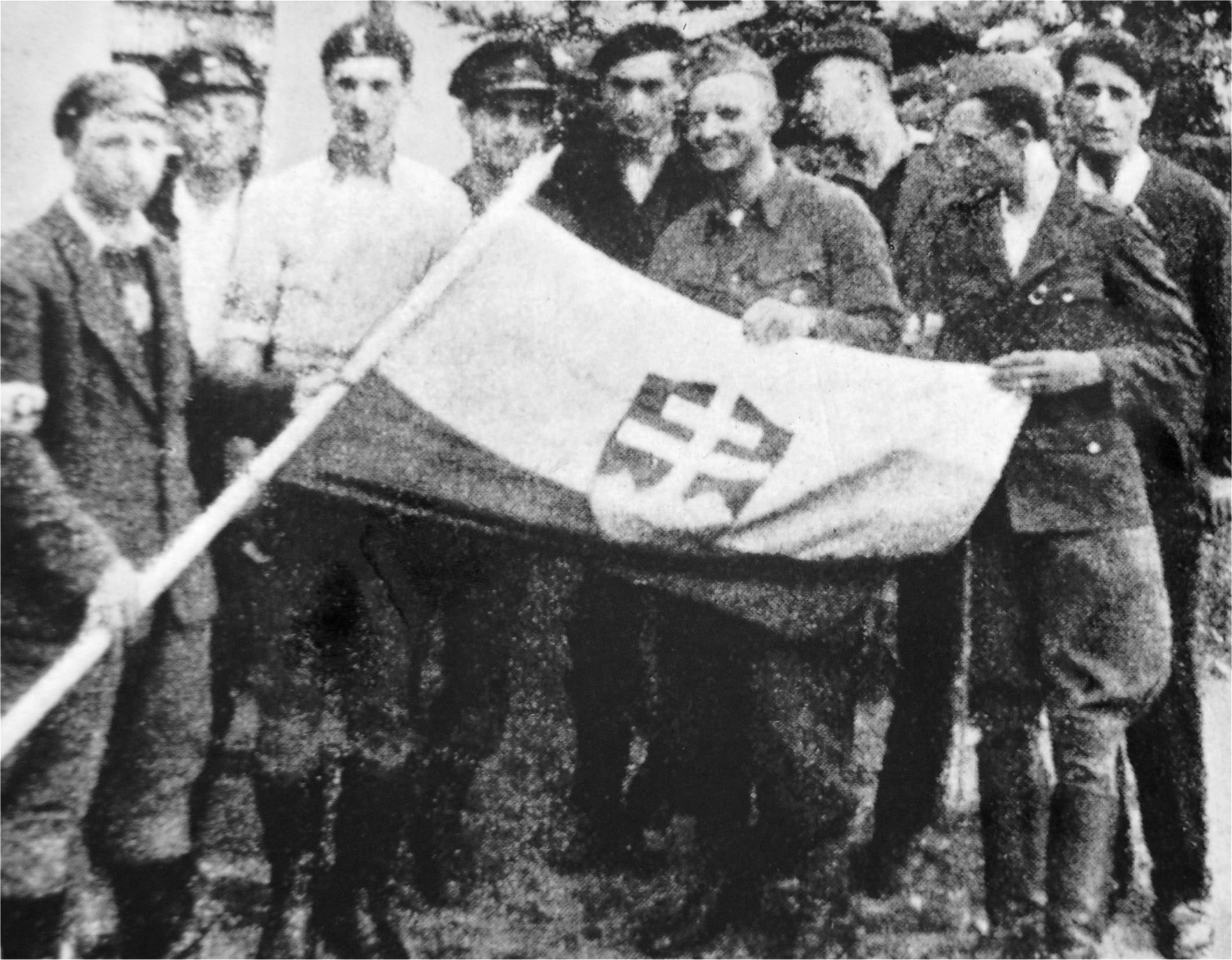
The 535th platoon of Slovaks under the command of Mirosław Iringh, part of the 1st company of the "Tur" battalion from the "Kryśka" Group fought in Czerniaków and Praga district during the uprising.

The exact number of the foreign fighters (obcokrajowcy in Polish), who fought in Warsaw for Poland's independence, is difficult to determine, taking into consideration the chaotic character of the Uprising causing their irregular registration. It is estimated that they numbered several hundred and represented at least 15 countries – Slovakia, Hungary, the United Kingdom, Australia, France, Belgium, the Netherlands, Greece, Italy, the United States, the Soviet Union, South Africa, Romania, Germany, and even Nigeria. These people – emigrants who had settled in Warsaw before the war, escapees from numerous POW, concentration and labor camps, and deserters from the German auxiliary forces – were absorbed in different fighting and supportive formations of the Polish underground. They wore the underground's red-white armband (the colors of the Polish national flag) and adopted the Polish traditional independence fighters' slogan 'Za naszą i waszą wolność' (For our and your freedom). Some of the 'obcokrajowcy' showed outstanding bravery in fighting the enemy and were awarded the highest decorations of the AK and the Polish government in exile.

During the fighting, the Poles obtained additional supplies through airdrops and by capture from the enemy, including several armored vehicles, notably two Panther tanks and two Sd.Kfz. 251 armored personnel carriers. Also, resistance workshops produced weapons throughout the fighting, including submachine guns, K pattern flamethrowers, grenades, mortars, and even an armored car (Kubuś). As of 1 August, Polish military supplies consisted of 1,000 guns, 1,750 pistols, 300 submachine guns, 60 assault rifles, 7 heavy machine guns, 20 anti-tank guns, and 25,000 hand grenades. "Such collection of light weapons might have been sufficient to launch an urban terror campaign, but not to seize control of the city".

=== Germans ===
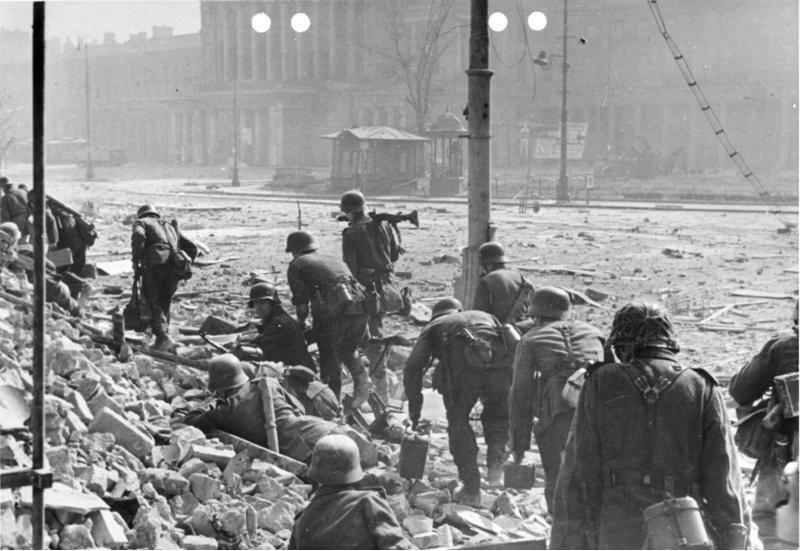
German soldiers fighting the Polish resistance at Theater Square in Warsaw, September 1944

In late July 1944 the German units stationed in and around Warsaw were divided into three categories. The first and the most numerous was the garrison of Warsaw. As of 31 July, it numbered some 11,000 troops under General Rainer Stahel.

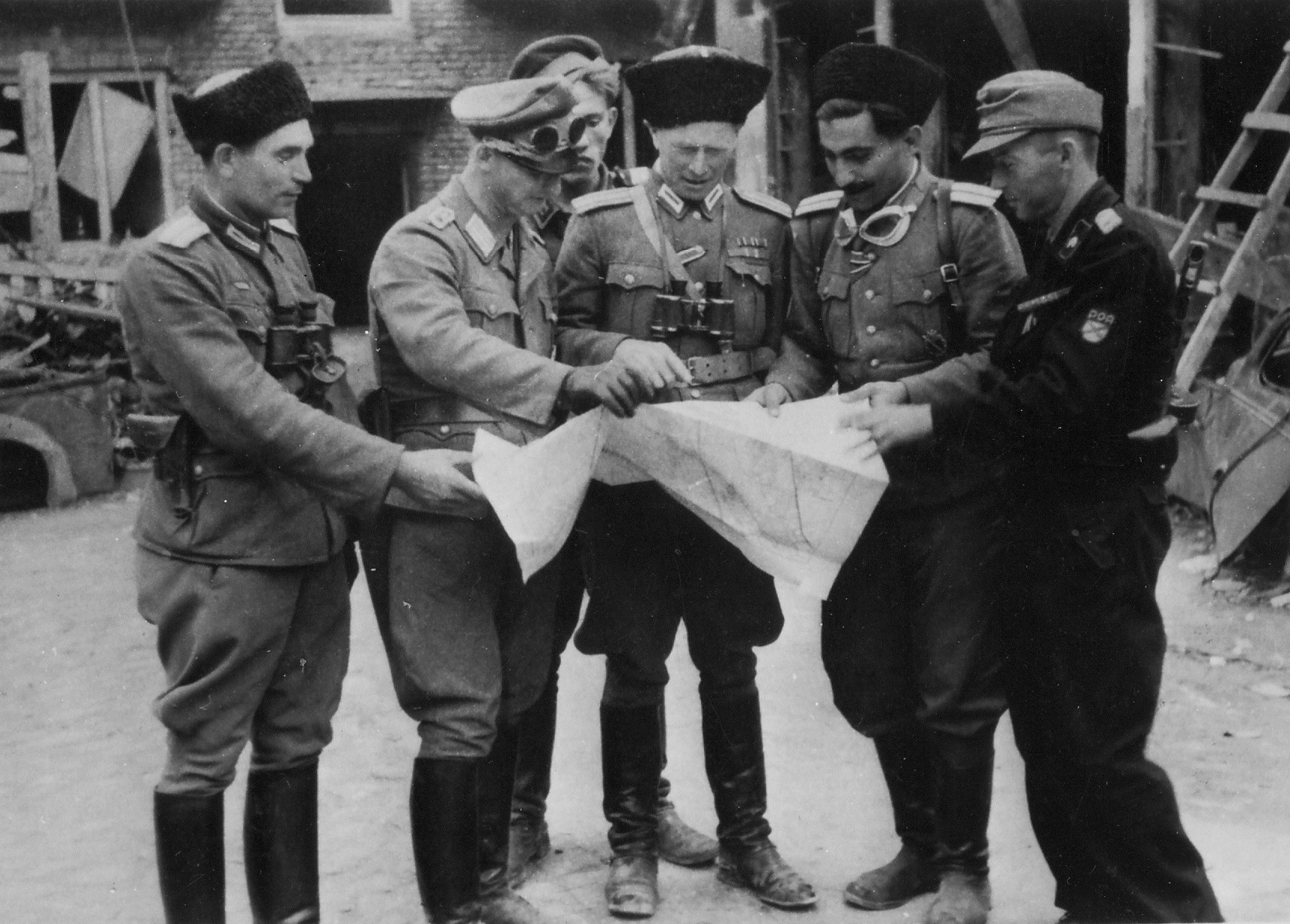
Commanding officers of the collaborationist Freiwillige (the Waffen-SS volunteers) brigade R.O.N.A. during the Warsaw Uprising, August 1944

These well-equipped German forces prepared for the defence of the city's key positions for many months. Several hundred concrete bunkers and barbed wire lines protected the buildings and areas occupied by the Germans. Apart from the garrison itself, numerous army units were stationed on both banks of the Vistula river and in the city. The second category was composed of police and SS, under SS and Police Leader SS-Oberführer Paul Otto Geibel, numbering initially 5,710 men, including Schutzpolizei and Waffen-SS. The third category was formed by various auxiliary units, including detachments of the Bahnschutz (rail guard), Werkschutz (factory guard) and the Polish Volksdeutsche (ethnic Germans in Poland) and Soviet former POW of the Sonderdienst and Sonderabteilungen paramilitary units.

During the uprising the German side received reinforcements on a daily basis. Stahel was replaced as overall commander by SS-General Erich von dem Bach in early August. As of 20 August 1944, the German units directly involved with fighting in Warsaw comprised 17,000 men arranged in two battle groups:

- Battle Group Rohr (commanded by Major General Rohr), which included 1,700 soldiers of the anti-communist S.S. Sturmbrigade R.O.N.A. Russkaya Osvoboditelnaya Narodnaya Armiya (Russian National Liberation Army, also known as Kaminski Brigade) under German command made up of Russian, Belorussian and Ukrainian collaborators,
- and Battle Group Reinefarth commanded by SS-Gruppenführer Heinz Reinefarth, which consisted of Attack Group Dirlewanger (commanded by Oskar Dirlewanger), which included Aserbaidschanische Legion (part of the Ostlegionen), Attack Group Reck (commanded by Major Reck), Attack Group Schmidt (commanded by Colonel Schmidt) and various support and backup units.

The Nazi forces included about 5,000 regular troops; 4,000 Luftwaffe personnel (1,000 at Okęcie airport, 700 at Bielany, 1,000 in Boernerowo, 300 at Służewiec and 1,000 in anti-air artillery posts throughout the city); as well as about 2,000 men of the Sentry Regiment Warsaw (Wachtregiment Warschau), including four infantry battalions (Patz, Baltz, No. 996 and No. 997), and an SS reconnaissance squadron with ca. 350 men.

== Uprising ==
=== W-hour or "Godzina W" ===
After days of hesitation, at 17:00 on 31 July, the Polish headquarters scheduled "W-hour" (from the Polish wybuch, "explosion"), the moment of the start of the uprising for 17:00 on the following day. The decision was a strategic miscalculation because the under-equipped resistance forces were prepared and trained for a series of coordinated surprise dawn attacks. In addition, although many units were already mobilized and waiting at assembly points throughout the city, the mobilization of thousands of young men and women was hard to conceal. Fighting started in advance of "W-hour", notably in Żoliborz, and around Napoleon Square and Dąbrowski Square. The Germans had anticipated the possibility of an uprising, though they had not realized its size or strength. At 16:30 Governor Fischer put the garrison on full alert.

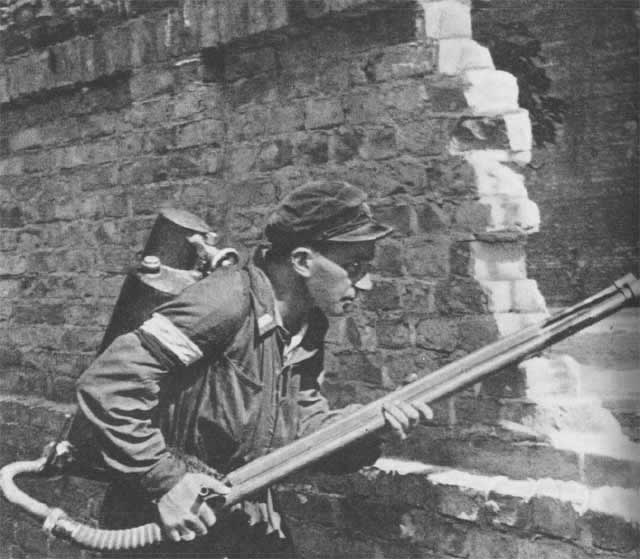
Resistance fighter armed with a K pattern flamethrower, 22 August 1944

That evening the resistance captured a major German arsenal, the main post office and power station and the Prudential building. However, Castle Square, the police district, and the airport remained in German hands. The first days were crucial in establishing the battlefield for the rest of the fight. The resistance fighters were most successful in the City Centre, Old Town and Wola districts. However, several major German strongholds remained, and in some areas of Wola the Poles sustained heavy losses that forced an early retreat. In other areas such as Mokotów, the attackers almost completely failed to secure any objectives and controlled only the residential areas. In Praga, on the east bank of the Vistula, the Poles were sent back into hiding by a high concentration of German forces. Most crucially, the fighters in different areas failed to link up with each other and with areas outside Warsaw, leaving each sector isolated from the others. After the first hours of fighting, many units adopted a more defensive strategy, while civilians began erecting barricades. Despite all the problems, by 4 August the majority of the city was in Polish hands, although some key strategic points remained untaken.

My Führer, the timing is unfortunate, but from a historical perspective what the Poles are doing is a blessing. After five, six weeks we shall leave. But by then Warsaw, the capital, the head, the intelligence of this former 16–17 million Polish people will be extinguished, this Volk that has blocked our way to the east for seven hundred years and has stood in our way ever since the First Battle of Tannenberg [in 1410]. After this the Polish problem will no longer be a great historical problem for the children who come after us, nor indeed will it be for us.

— SS Chief Heinrich Himmler to Adolf Hitler when he learned about the Warsaw Uprising

=== First four days ===
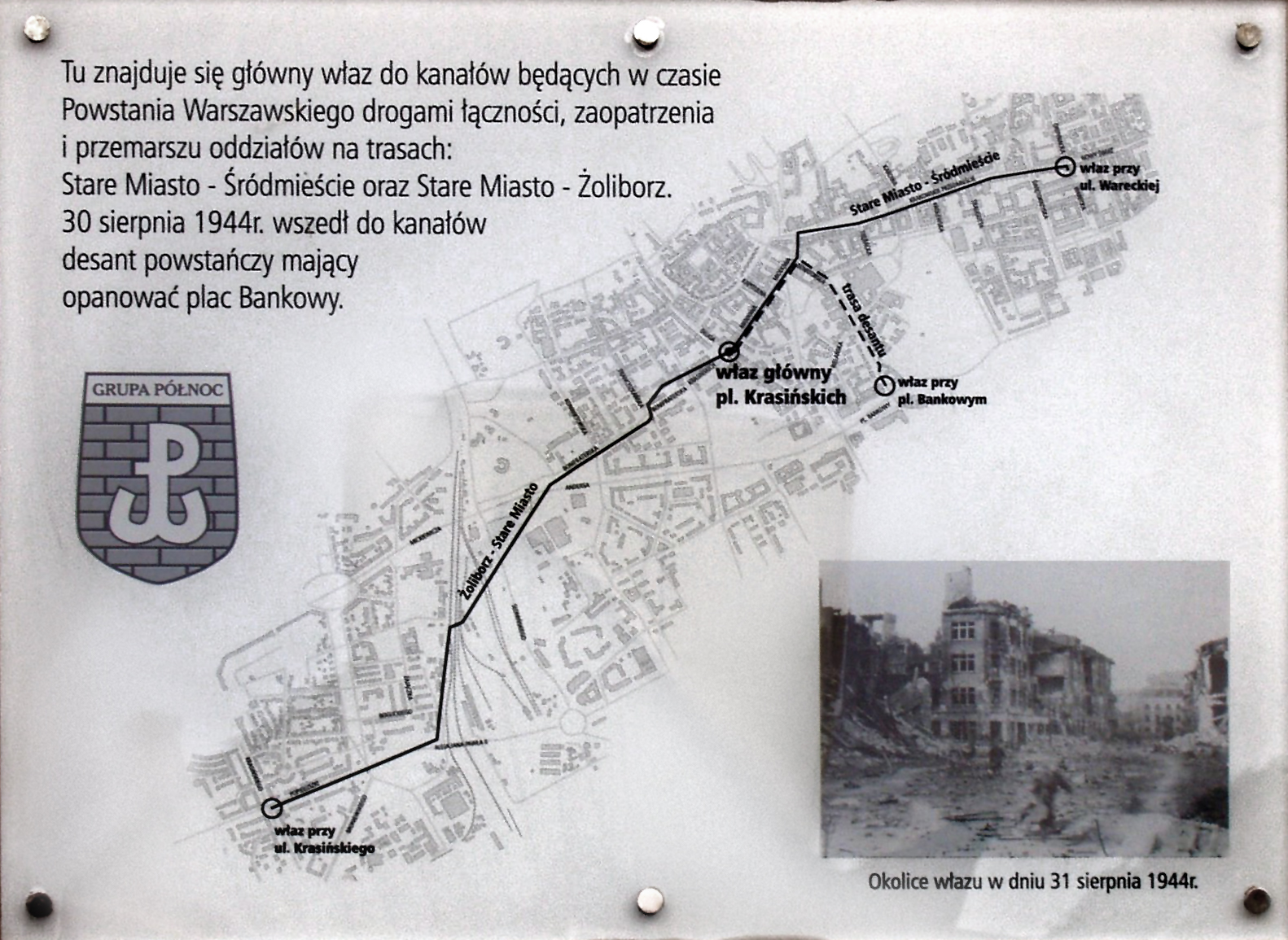
The city's sewer system was used to move resistance fighters between the Old Town, Śródmieście and Żoliborz districts.

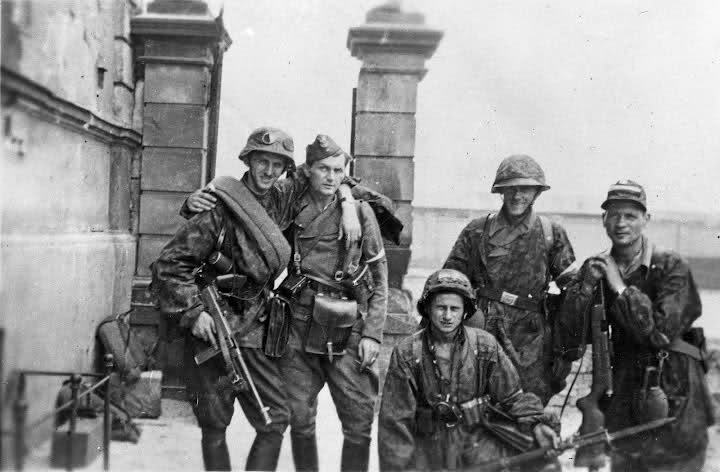
Home Army soldiers from Kolegium "A" of Kedyw formation on Stawki Street in the Wola District of Warsaw, September 1944

The uprising was intended to last a few days until Soviet forces arrived; however, this never happened, and the Polish forces had to fight with little outside assistance. The results of the first two days of fighting in different parts of the city were as follows:

- Area I (city centre and the Old Town): Units captured most of their assigned territory, but failed to capture areas with strong pockets of resistance from the Germans (the Warsaw University buildings, PAST skyscraper, the headquarters of the German garrison in the Saxon Palace, the German-only area near Szucha Avenue, and the bridges over the Vistula). They thus failed to create a central stronghold, secure communication links to other areas, or a secure land connection with the northern area of Żoliborz through the northern railway line and the Citadel.
- Area II (Żoliborz, Marymont, Bielany): Units failed to secure the most important military targets near Żoliborz. Many units retreated outside of the city, into the forests. Although they captured most of the area around Żoliborz, the soldiers of Colonel Mieczysław Niedzielski ("Żywiciel") failed to secure the Citadel area and break through German defences at Warsaw Gdańsk railway station.
- Area III (Wola): Units initially secured most of the territory, but sustained heavy losses (up to 30%). Some units retreated into the forests, while others retreated to the eastern part of the area. In the northern part of Wola the soldiers of Colonel Jan Mazurkiewicz ("Radosław") managed to capture the German barracks, the German supply depot at Stawki Street, and the flanking position at the Okopowa Street Jewish Cemetery (see Defense of the Wola cemeteries).
- Area IV (Ochota): The units mobilized in this area did not capture either the territory or the military targets (the Gęsiówka concentration camp, and the SS and Sipo barracks on Narutowicz Square). After suffering heavy casualties most of the Home Army forces retreated to the forests west of Warsaw. Only two small units of approximately 200 to 300 men under Lieut. Andrzej Chyczewski ("Gustaw") remained in the area and managed to create strong pockets of resistance. They were later reinforced by units from the city centre. Elite units of the Kedyw managed to secure most of the northern part of the area and captured all of the military targets there. However, they were soon tied down by German tactical counter-attacks from the south and west.
- Area V (Mokotów): The situation in this area was very serious from the start of hostilities. The partisans aimed to capture the heavily defended Police Area (Dzielnica policyjna) on Rakowiecka Street, and establish a connection with the city centre through open terrain at the former airfield of Mokotów Field. As both of the areas were heavily fortified and could be approached only through open terrain, the assaults failed. Some units retreated into the forests, while others managed to capture parts of Dolny Mokotów, which was, however, severed from most communication routes to other areas.
- Area VI (Praga): The Uprising was also started on the right bank of the Vistula, where the main task was to seize the bridges on the river and secure the bridgeheads until the arrival of the Red Army. It was clear that, since the location was far worse than that of the other areas, there was no chance of any help from outside. After some minor initial successes, the forces of Lt.Col. Antoni Żurowski ("Andrzej") were badly outnumbered by the Germans. The fights were halted, and the Home Army forces were forced back underground.
- Area VII (Powiat warszawski): this area consisted of territories outside Warsaw city limits. Actions here mostly failed to capture their targets.

An additional area within the Polish command structure was formed by the units of the Directorate of Sabotage and Diversion or Kedyw, an elite formation that was to guard the headquarters and was to be used as an "armed ambulance", thrown into the battle in the most endangered areas. These units secured parts of Śródmieście and Wola; along with the units of Area I, they were the most successful during the first few hours.

Among the most notable primary targets that were not taken during the opening stages of the uprising were the airfields of Okęcie and Mokotów Field, as well as the PAST skyscraper overlooking the city centre and the Gdańsk railway station guarding the passage between the centre and the northern borough of Żoliborz.

The leaders of the uprising counted only on the rapid entry of the Red Army in Warsaw ('on the second or third or, at the latest, by the seventh day of the fighting') and were more prepared for a confrontation with the Russians. At this time, the head of the government in exile Mikolajczyk met with Stalin on 3 August 1944 in Moscow and raised the questions of his imminent arrival in Warsaw, the return to power of his government in Poland, as well as the Eastern borders of Poland, while categorically refusing to recognize the Curzon Line as the basis for negotiations. In saying this, Mikolajczyk was well aware that the USSR and Stalin had repeatedly stated their demand for recognition of the Curzon Line as the basis for negotiations and categorically refused to change their position. 23 March 1944 Stalin said 'he could not depart from the Curzon Line; in spite of Churchill's post-Teheran reference to his Curzon Line policy as one 'of force', he still believed it to be the only legitimate settlement'. Thus, the Warsaw uprising was actively used to achieve political goals. The question of assistance to the insurrection was not raised by Mikolajczyk, apparently for reasons that it might weaken the position in the negotiations. 'The substance of the two-and-a-half-hour discussion was a harsh disagreement about future of Poland, the Uprising – considered by the Poles as a bargaining chip – turned to be disadvantageous for Mikolajczyk's position since it made him seem like a supplicant (...) Nothing was agreed about the Uprising.' The question of helping the "Home Army" with weapons was only raised, but Stalin refused to discuss this question until the formation of a new government was decided.

=== Wola and Ochota massacres ===
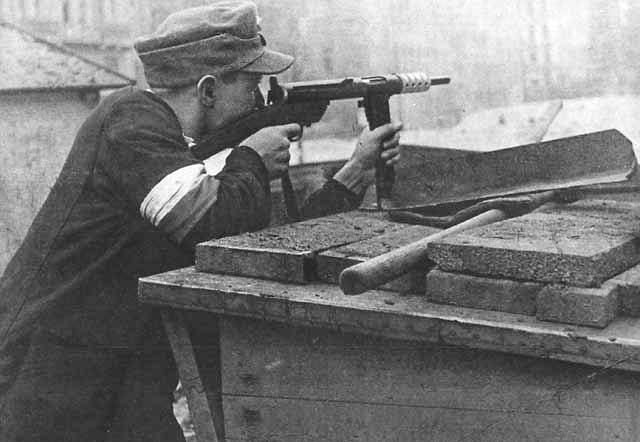
Home Army soldier armed with Błyskawica submachine gun defending a barricade in Powiśle District of Warsaw during the Uprising, August 1944

The Uprising reached its apogee on 4 August when the Home Army soldiers managed to establish front lines in the westernmost boroughs of Wola and Ochota. However, it was also the moment at which the German army stopped its retreat westwards and began receiving reinforcements. On the same day SS General Erich von dem Bach was appointed commander of all the forces employed against the Uprising. German counter-attacks aimed to link up with the remaining German pockets and then cut off the Uprising from the Vistula river. Among the reinforcing units were forces under the command of Heinz Reinefarth.

On 5 August Reinefarth's three attack groups started their advance westward along Wolska and Górczewska streets toward the main east–west communication line of Jerusalem Avenue. Their advance was halted, but the regiments began carrying out Heinrich Himmler's orders: behind the lines, special SS, police and Wehrmacht groups went from house to house, shooting the inhabitants regardless of age or gender and burning their bodies. Estimates of civilians killed in Wola and Ochota range from 20,000 to 50,000, 40,000 by 8 August in Wola alone, or as high as 100,000. The main perpetrators were Oskar Dirlewanger and Bronislav Kaminski, whose forces committed the cruelest atrocities.

Atrocities included multiple crowds of men and women being gunned down in churchyards. Householders were pulled into the streets to be butchered with bayonets and sabres. Pregnant women were drawn and quartered. Children were also chopped to pieces.

The policy was designed to crush the Poles' will to fight and put the uprising to an end without having to commit to heavy city fighting. With time, the Germans realized that atrocities only stiffened resistance and that some political solution should be found, as the thousands of men at the disposal of the German commander were unable to effectively counter the resistance in an urban guerrilla setting. They aimed to gain a significant victory to show the Home Army the futility of further fighting and induce them to surrender. This did not succeed. Until mid-September, the Germans shot all captured resistance fighters on the spot, but from the end of September, some of the captured Polish soldiers were treated as POWs.

=== Stalemate ===
This is the fiercest of our battles since the start of the war. It compares to the street battles of Stalingrad.

— SS chief Heinrich Himmler to German generals on 21 September 1944.

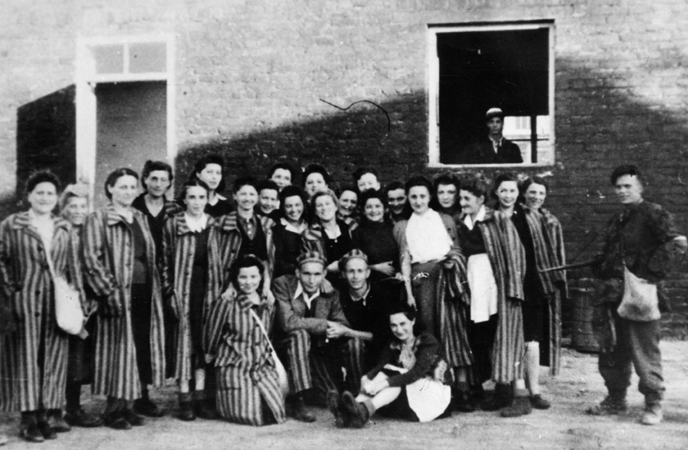
Jewish prisoners of Gęsiówka concentration camp liberated by Polish Home Army soldiers from "Zośka" Battalion, 5 August 1944

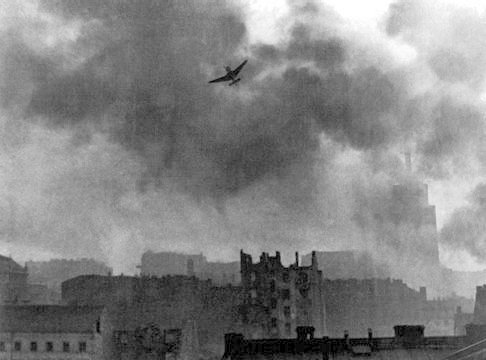
German Stuka Ju 87 bombing Warsaw's Old Town, August 1944; the rebels were unable to capture the airfields and only six German aircraft could make a large number of sorties, causing great destruction to the city

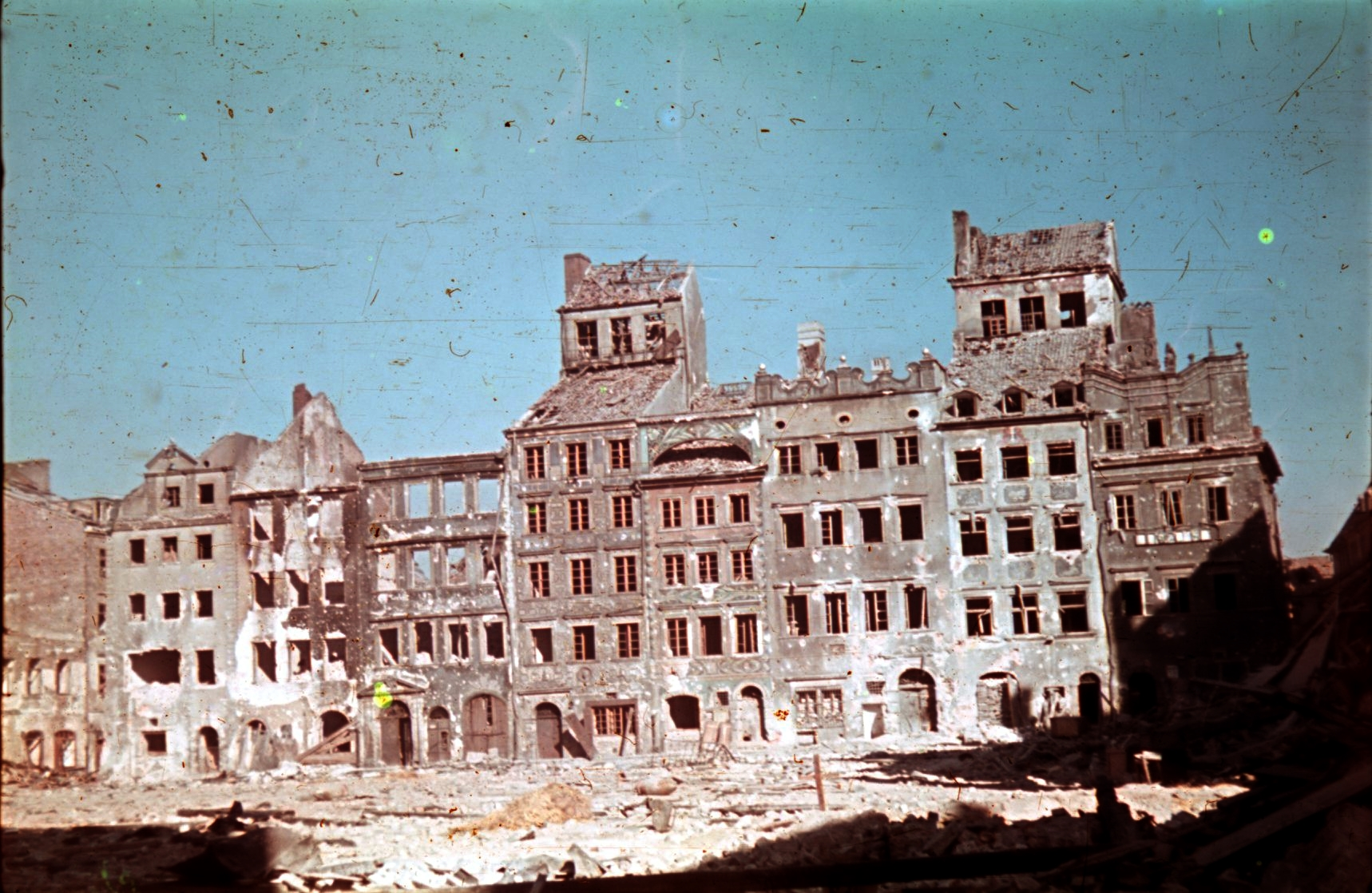
Warsaw's Old Town Market Place, August 1944

Despite the loss of Wola, the Polish resistance strengthened. Zośka and Wacek battalions managed to capture the ruins of the Warsaw Ghetto and liberate the Gęsiówka concentration camp, freeing about 350 Jews. The area became one of the main communication links between the resistance fighting in Wola and those defending the Old Town. On 7 August German forces were strengthened by the arrival of tanks using civilians as human shields. After two days of heavy fighting they managed to bisect Wola and reach Bankowy Square. However, by then the net of barricades, street fortifications, and tank obstacles were already well-prepared; both sides reached a stalemate, with heavy house-to-house fighting.

Between 9 and 18 August pitched battles raged around the Old Town and nearby Bankowy Square, with successful attacks by the Germans and counter-attacks from the Poles. German tactics hinged on bombardment through the use of heavy artillery and tactical bombers, against which the Poles were unable to effectively defend, as they lacked anti-aircraft artillery weapons. Even clearly marked hospitals were dive-bombed by Stukas.

Although the Battle of Stalingrad had already shown the danger a city can pose to armies which fight within it and the importance of local support, the Warsaw Uprising was probably the first demonstration that in an urban terrain, a vastly under-equipped force supported by the civilian population can hold its own against better-equipped professional soldiers – though at the cost of considerable sacrifice on the part of the city's residents.

The Poles held the Old Town until a decision to withdraw was made at the end of August. On successive nights until 2 September, the defenders of the Old Town withdrew through the sewers, which were a major means of communication between different parts of the Uprising. Thousands of people were evacuated in this way. Those that remained were either shot or transported to concentration camps like Mauthausen and Sachsenhausen once the Germans regained control.

=== Berling's landings ===
Soviet attacks on the 4th SS Panzer Corps east of Warsaw were renewed on 26 August, and the Germans were forced to retreat into Praga. The Soviet army under the command of Konstantin Rokossovsky captured Praga and arrived on the east bank of the Vistula in mid-September. By 13 September, the Germans had destroyed the remaining bridges over the Vistula, signalling that they were abandoning all their positions east of the river. In the Praga area, Polish units under the command of General Zygmunt Berling (thus sometimes known as berlingowcy – "the Berling men") fought on the Soviet side. Three patrols of his First Polish Army (1 Armia Wojska Polskiego) landed in the Czerniaków and Powiśle areas and made contact with Home Army forces on the night of 14/15 September. The artillery cover and air support provided by the Soviets was unable to effectively counter enemy machine-gun fire as the Poles crossed the river, and the landing troops sustained heavy losses. Only small elements of the main units made it ashore (I and III battalions of 9th infantry regiment, 3rd Infantry Division).

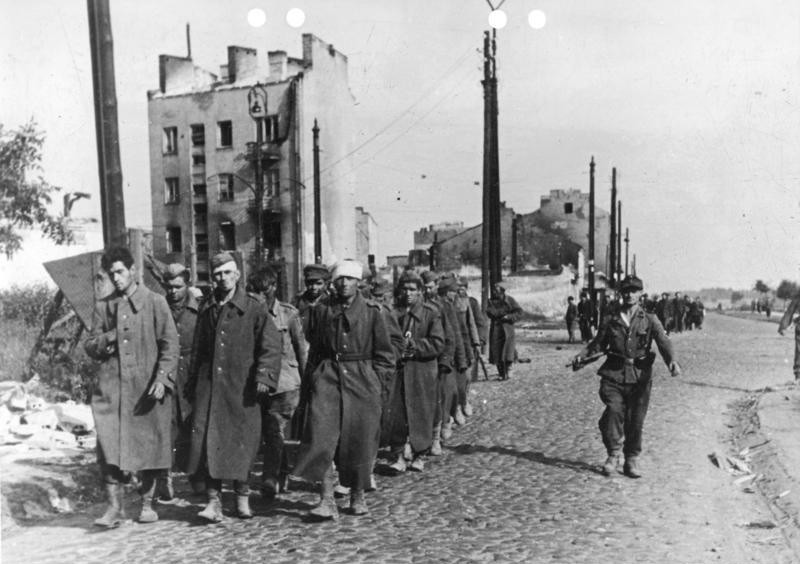
Captured soldiers from Berling's First Polish Army marching through Opaczewska Street in Ochota district, September or October 1944

The limited landings by the 1st Polish Army represented the only external ground force which arrived to physically support the uprising; and even they were curtailed by the Soviet High Command due to the losses they took.

The Germans intensified their attacks on the Home Army positions near the river to prevent any further landings, but were not able to make any significant advances for several days while Polish forces held those vital positions in preparation for a new expected wave of Soviet landings. Polish units from the eastern shore attempted several more landings, and from 15 to 23 September sustained heavy losses (including the destruction of all their landing boats and most of their other river crossing equipment). Red Army support was inadequate. After the failure of repeated attempts by the 1st Polish Army to link up with the resistance, the Soviets limited their assistance to sporadic artillery and air support. Conditions that prevented the Germans from dislodging the resistance also acted to prevent the Poles from dislodging the Germans. Plans for a river crossing were suspended "for at least 4 months", since operations against the 9th Army's five panzer divisions were problematic at that point, and the commander of the 1st Polish Army, General Berling was relieved of his duties by his Soviet superiors.

On the night of 19 September, after no further attempts from the other side of the river were made and the promised evacuation of wounded did not take place, Home Army soldiers and landed elements of the 1st Polish Army were forced to begin a retreat from their positions on the bank of the river. Out of approximately 900 men who made it ashore, only a handful made it back to the eastern shore of the Vistula. Berling's Polish Army losses in the attempt to aid the Uprising were 5,660 killed, missing or wounded. From this point on, the Warsaw Uprising can be seen as a one-sided war of attrition or, alternatively, as a fight for acceptable terms of surrender. The Poles were besieged in three areas of the city: Śródmieście, Żoliborz and Mokotów.

== Life behind the lines ==
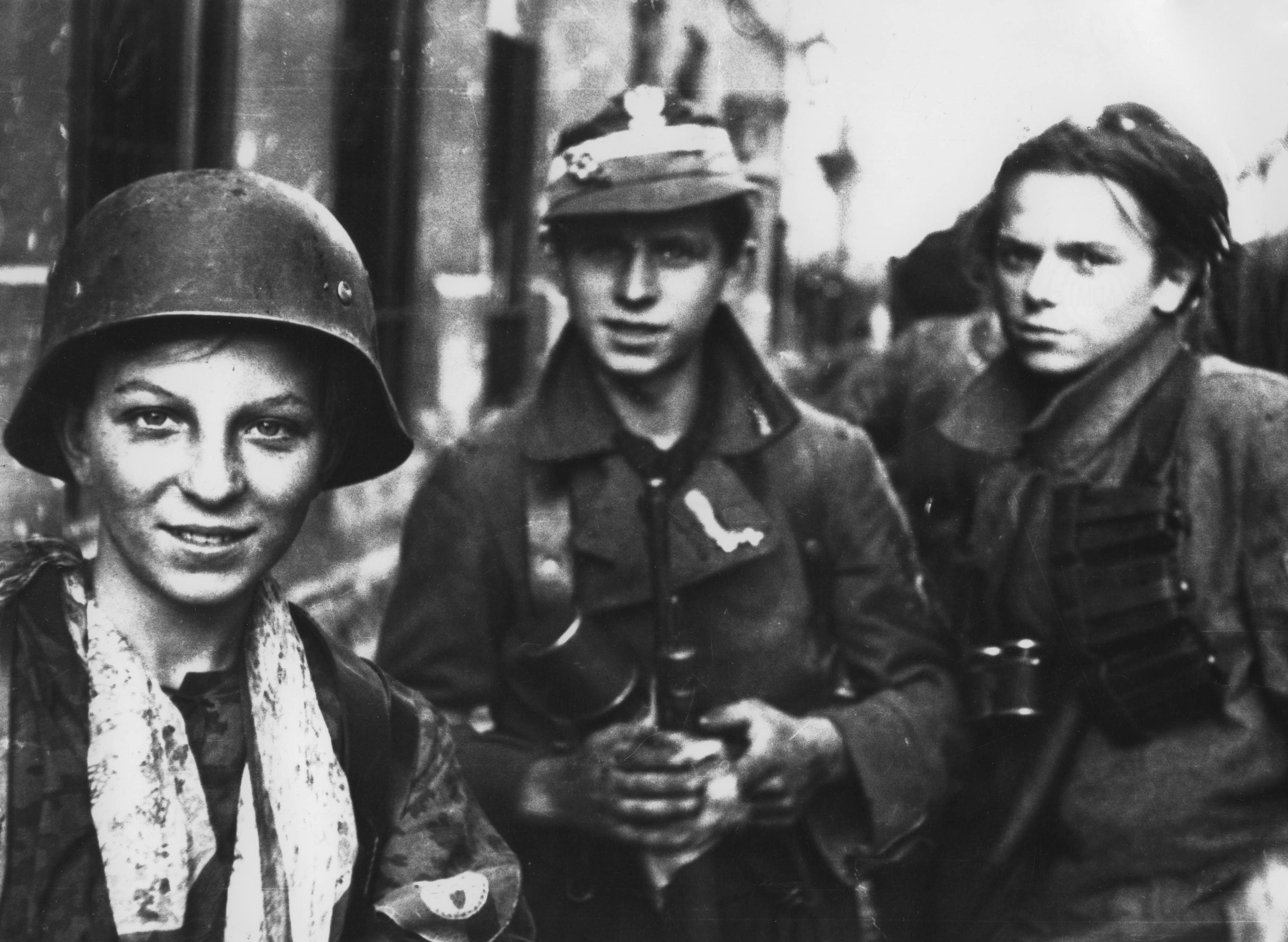
Tadeusz Rajszczak "Maszynka" (left), Ryszard Michał Lach, and one other young soldier from "Miotła" Battalion, 2 September 1944

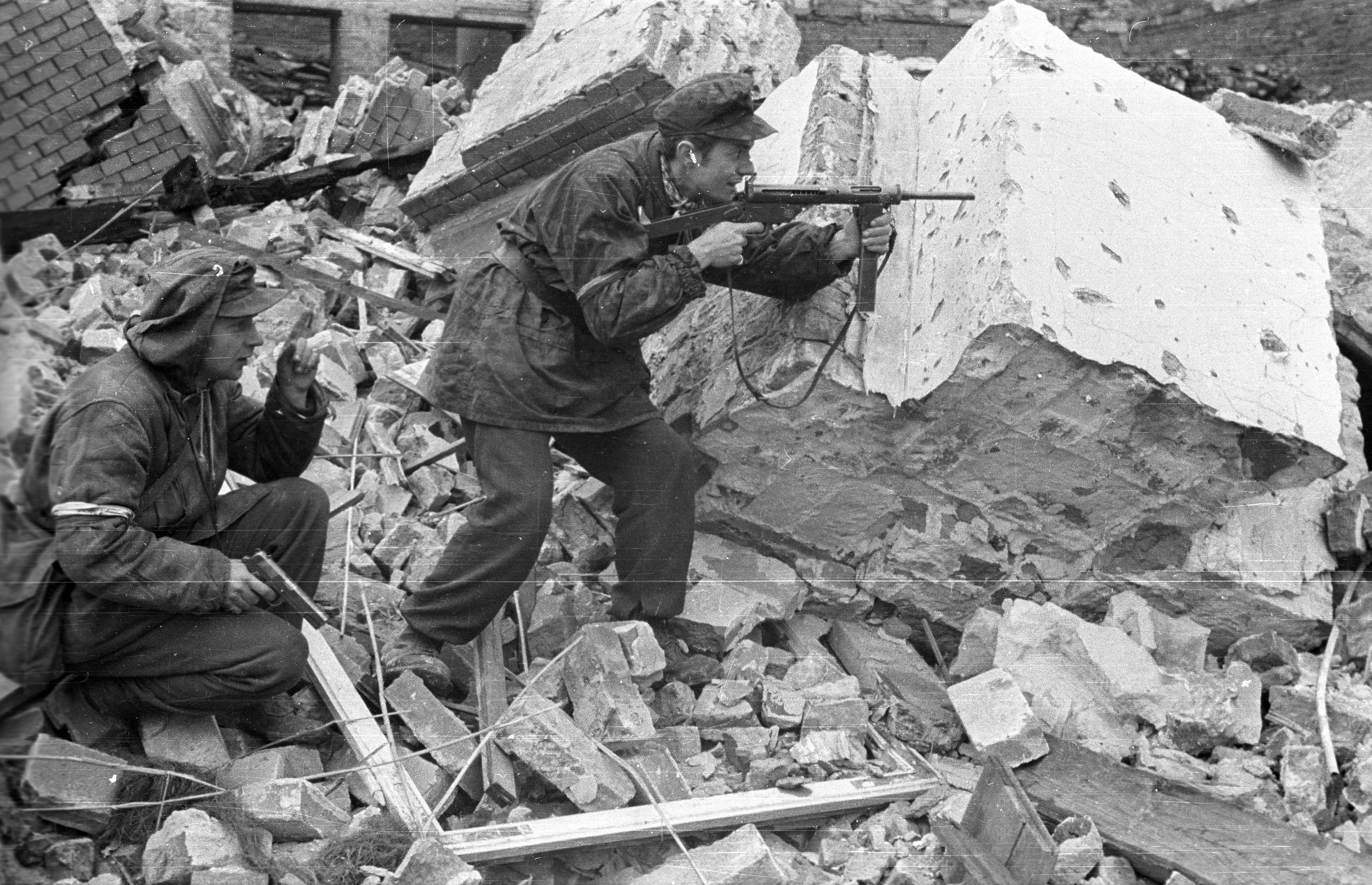
Home Army soldiers Henryk Ożarek "Henio" (left) holding a Vis pistol and Tadeusz Przybyszewski "Roma" (right) firing a Błyskawica submachine gun, from "Anna" Company of the "Gustaw" Battalion fighting on Kredytowa-Królewska Street, 3 October 1944

In 1939 Warsaw had roughly 1,350,000 inhabitants. Over a million were still living in the city at the start of the Uprising. In Polish-controlled territory, during the first weeks of the Uprising, people tried to recreate the normal day-to-day life of their free country. Cultural life was vibrant, both among the soldiers and civilian population, with theatres, post offices, newspapers and similar activities. Boys and girls of the Polish Scouts acted as couriers for an underground postal service, risking their lives daily to transmit any information that might help their people. Doctors, including Halina Chmielewska, set up sanitation stations around the city on the instruction of Stefan Starzyński. Near the end of the Uprising, lack of food and medicine, overcrowding and indiscriminate German air and artillery assault on the city made the civilian situation more and more desperate.

=== Food shortages ===
As the Uprising was supposed to be relieved by the Soviets in a matter of days, the Polish underground did not predict food shortages would be a problem. However, as the fighting dragged on, the inhabitants of the city faced hunger and starvation. A major break-through took place on 6 August, when Polish units recaptured the Haberbusch i Schiele brewery complex at Ceglana Street. From that time on, the citizens of Warsaw lived mostly on barley from the brewery's warehouses. Every day, up to several thousand people organized into cargo teams reported to the brewery for bags of barley and then distributed them in the city centre. The barley was then ground in coffee grinders and boiled with water to form a so-called spit-soup (Polish: pluj-zupa). The "Sowiński" Battalion managed to hold the brewery until the end of the fighting.

Another serious problem for civilians and soldiers alike was a shortage of water. By mid-August, most of the water conduits were either out of order or filled with corpses. In addition, the main water pumping station remained in German hands. To prevent the spread of epidemics and provide the people with water, the authorities ordered all janitors to supervise the construction of water wells in the backyards of every house. On 21 September, the Germans blew up the remaining pumping stations at Koszykowa Street and after that, the public wells were the only source of potable water in the besieged city. By the end of September, the city centre had more than 90 functioning wells.

=== Polish media ===
Polish Radio broadcast in English
A news programme on the daily fights in Warsaw

Before the Uprising the Bureau of Information and Propaganda of the Home Army had set up a group of war correspondents. Headed by Antoni Bohdziewicz, the group made three newsreels and over 30,000 meters of film tape documenting the struggles. The first newsreel was shown to the public on 13 August in the Palladium cinema at Złota Street. In addition to films, dozens of newspapers appeared from the first days of the uprising. Several previously underground newspapers started to be distributed openly. The two main daily newspapers were the government-run Rzeczpospolita Polska and military Biuletyn Informacyjny. There were also several dozen newspapers, magazines, bulletins and weeklies published routinely by various organizations and military units.

The Błyskawica long-range radio transmitter, assembled on 7 August in the city centre, was run by the military, but was also used by the recreated Polish Radio from 9 August. It was on the air three or four times a day, broadcasting news programmes and appeals for help in Polish, English, German and French, as well as reports from the government, patriotic poems and music. It was the only such radio station in German-held Europe. Among the speakers appearing on the resistance radio were Jan Nowak-Jeziorański, Zbigniew Świętochowski, Stefan Sojecki, Jeremi Przybora, and John Ward, a war correspondent for The Times of London.

== Outside support ==
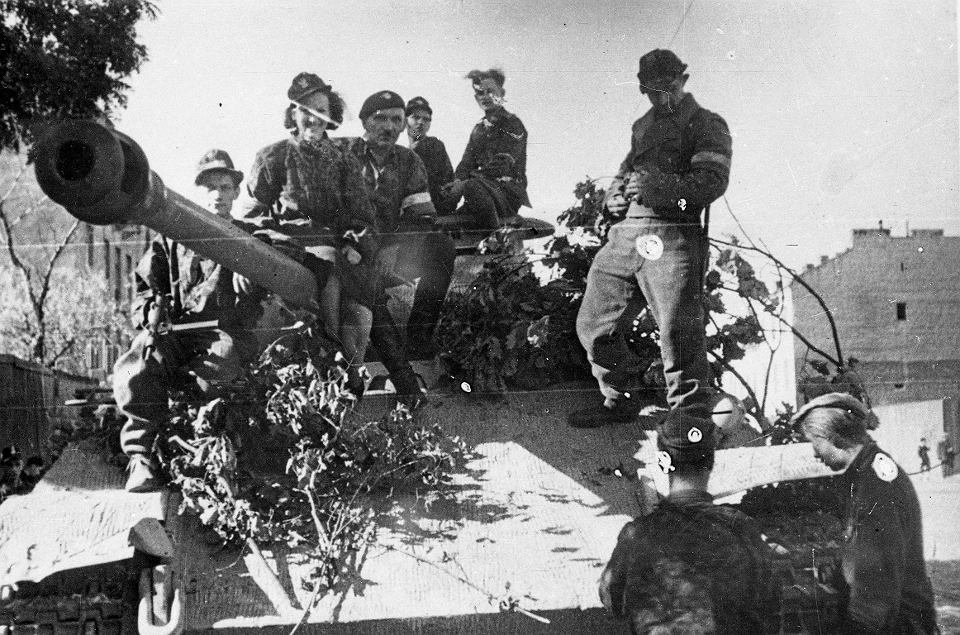
German Panther tank captured by resistance fighters from "Zośka" Battalion under the command of Wacław Micuta, 2 August 1944

According to many historians, a major cause of the eventual failure of the uprising was the almost complete lack of outside support and the late arrival of that which did arrive. The Polish government-in-exile carried out frantic diplomatic efforts to gain support from the Western Allies prior to the start of battle but the allies would not act without Soviet approval. The Polish government in London asked the British several times to send an allied mission to Poland. However, the British mission did not arrive until December 1944. Shortly after their arrival, they met up with Soviet authorities, who arrested and imprisoned them. In the words of the mission's deputy commander, it was "a complete failure". Nevertheless, from August 1943 to July 1944, over 200 British Royal Air Force (RAF) flights dropped an estimated 146 Polish personnel trained in Great Britain, over 4,000 containers of supplies, and $16 million in banknotes and gold to the Home Army.

The only support operation which ran continuously for the duration of the Uprising were night supply drops by long-range planes of the RAF, other British Commonwealth air forces, and units of the Polish Air Force, which had to use distant airfields in Italy, reducing the amount of supplies they could carry. The RAF made 223 sorties and lost 34 aircraft. The effect of these airdrops was mostly psychological – they delivered too few supplies for the needs of the resistance, and many airdrops landed outside Polish-controlled territory.

=== Airdrops ===
There was no difficulty in finding Warsaw. It was visible from 100 kilometers away. The city was in flames but with so many huge fires burning, it was almost impossible to pick up the target marker flares.

— William Fairly, a South African pilot, from an interview in 1982

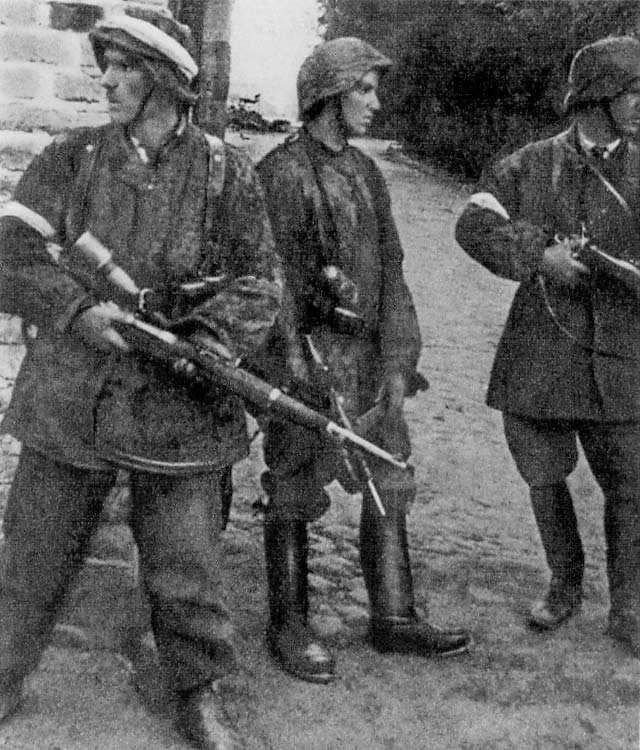
Home Army soldiers from "Zośka" Battalion liberating Gęsiówka concentration camp. Only Juliusz Deczkowski (centre) survived. Tadeusz Milewski "Ćwik" (right) was killed later in the day and Wojciech Omyła "Wojtek" (left) was killed several days later, 5 August 1944

From 4 August the Western Allies began supporting the Uprising with airdrops of munitions and other supplies. Initially the flights were carried out mostly by the 1568th Polish Special Duties Flight of the Polish Air Force (later renamed No. 301 Polish Bomber Squadron) stationed in Bari and Brindisi in Italy, flying B-24 Liberator, Handley Page Halifax, and Douglas C-47 Dakota planes. Later on, at the insistence of the Polish government-in-exile, they were joined by the Liberators of 2 Wing – No.31 and No. 34 Squadrons of the South African Air Force based at Foggia in Southern Italy, and Halifaxes, flown by No. 148 and No. 178 RAF Squadrons. The drops by British, Polish, and South African forces continued until 21 September. The total weight of allied drops varies according to source (104 tons, 230 tons or 239 tons), over 200 flights were made.

The Soviet Union did not allow the Western Allies to use its airports for the airdrops for several weeks, so the planes had to use bases in the United Kingdom and Italy which reduced their carrying weight and number of sorties. The Allies' specific request for the use of landing strips made on 20 August was denied by Stalin on 22 August. Stalin referred to the Polish resistance as "a handful of criminals" and stated that the Uprising was inspired by "enemies of the Soviet Union". Thus, by denying landing rights to Allied aircraft on Soviet-controlled territory the Soviets vastly limited effectiveness of Allied assistance to the Uprising, and even fired at Allied airplanes which carried supplies from Italy and strayed into Soviet-controlled airspace.

American support was also limited. After Stalin's objections to supporting the uprising, British prime minister Winston Churchill telegraphed US president Franklin D. Roosevelt on 25 August and proposed sending planes in defiance of Stalin, to "see what happens". Unwilling to upset Stalin before the Yalta Conference, Roosevelt replied on 26 August: "I do not consider it advantageous to the long-range general war prospect for me to join you".

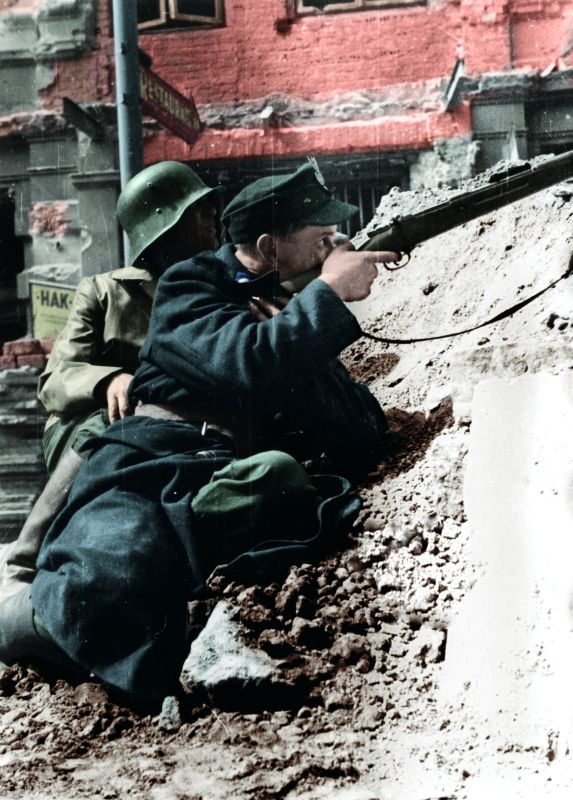
Soldier from the "Kiliński" Battalion pictured aiming his rifle at the German-occupied PAST building, 20 August 1944

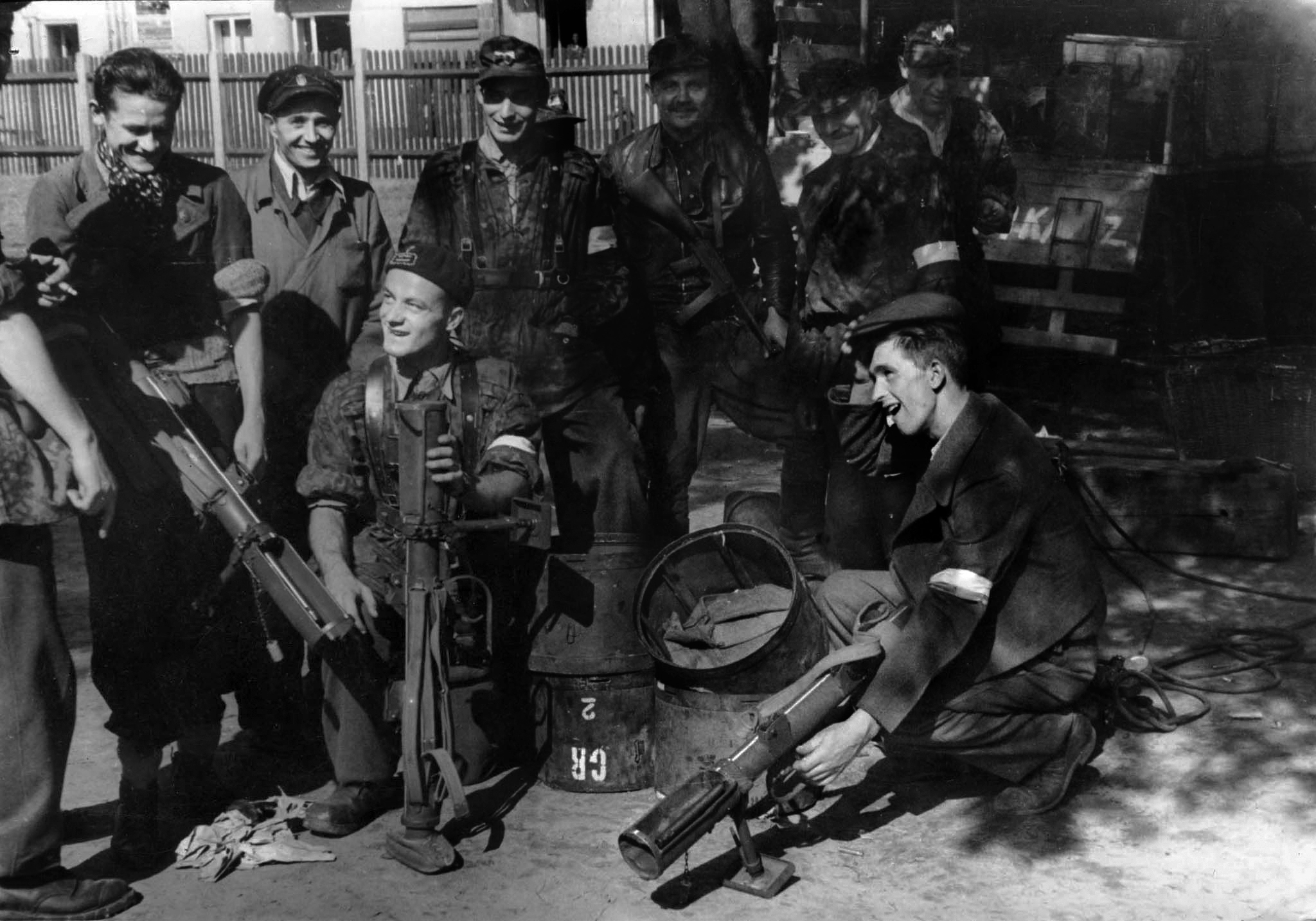
Polish insurgents in the Wola district recover PIAT anti-tank weapons from air-dropped containers.

Finally on 18 September the Soviets allowed a USAAF flight of 107 B-17 Flying Fortresses of the Eighth Air Force's 3rd Division to re-fuel and reload at Soviet airfields used in Operation Frantic, but it was too little too late. The planes dropped 100 tons of supplies but only 20 were recovered by the resistance due to the wide area over which they were spread. The vast majority of supplies fell into German-held areas. The USAAF lost two B-17s with a further seven damaged. The aircraft landed at the Operation Frantic airbases in the Soviet Union, where they were rearmed and refueled, and the next day 100 B-17s and 61 P-51s left the USSR to bomb the marshalling yard at Szolnok in Hungary on their way back to bases in Italy. Soviet intelligence reports show that Soviet commanders on the ground near Warsaw estimated that 96% of the supplies dropped by the Americans fell into German hands. From the Soviet perspective, the Americans were supplying the Nazis instead of aiding the Polish resistance. The Soviets refused permission for any further American flights until 30 September, by which time the weather was too poor to fly, and the Uprising was nearly over.

Between 13 and 30 September, Soviet aircraft commenced their own re-supply missions, dropping arms, medicines and food supplies. Initially these supplies were dropped in canisters without parachutes which led to damage and loss of the contents. Also, a large number of canisters fell into German hands. The Soviet Air Forces flew 2,535 re-supply sorties with small bi-plane Polikarpov Po-2s, delivering a total of 156 50-mm mortars, 505 anti-tank rifles, 1,478 sub-machine guns, 520 rifles, 669 carbines, 41,780 hand grenades, 37,216 mortar shells, over 3 million cartridges, 131.2 tons of food, and 515 kg of medicine.

Although German air defence over the Warsaw area itself was almost non-existent, about 12% of the 296 planes taking part in the operations were lost because they had to fly 1,600 kilometres (990 miles) out and the same distance back over heavily defended enemy territory (112 out of 637 Polish and 133 out of 735 British and South African airmen were shot down). Most of the drops were made during the night, at no more than 30–90 m (100–300 ft) altitude, and poor accuracy left many parachuted packages stranded behind German-controlled territory (only about 50 tons of supplies, less than 50% delivered, was recovered by the resistance).

The level of losses during the operation was very high, especially for the conditions of mid-1944. In the first flight on 4–5 August, 5 out of 7 aircraft were lost. In subsequent flights, the level of losses decreased, but remained very high. For example, on 13–14 August, 3 planes out of 28 were shot down, and 4 planes were forced to make forced landings in territories occupied by the USSR due to damage.

=== Soviet stance ===
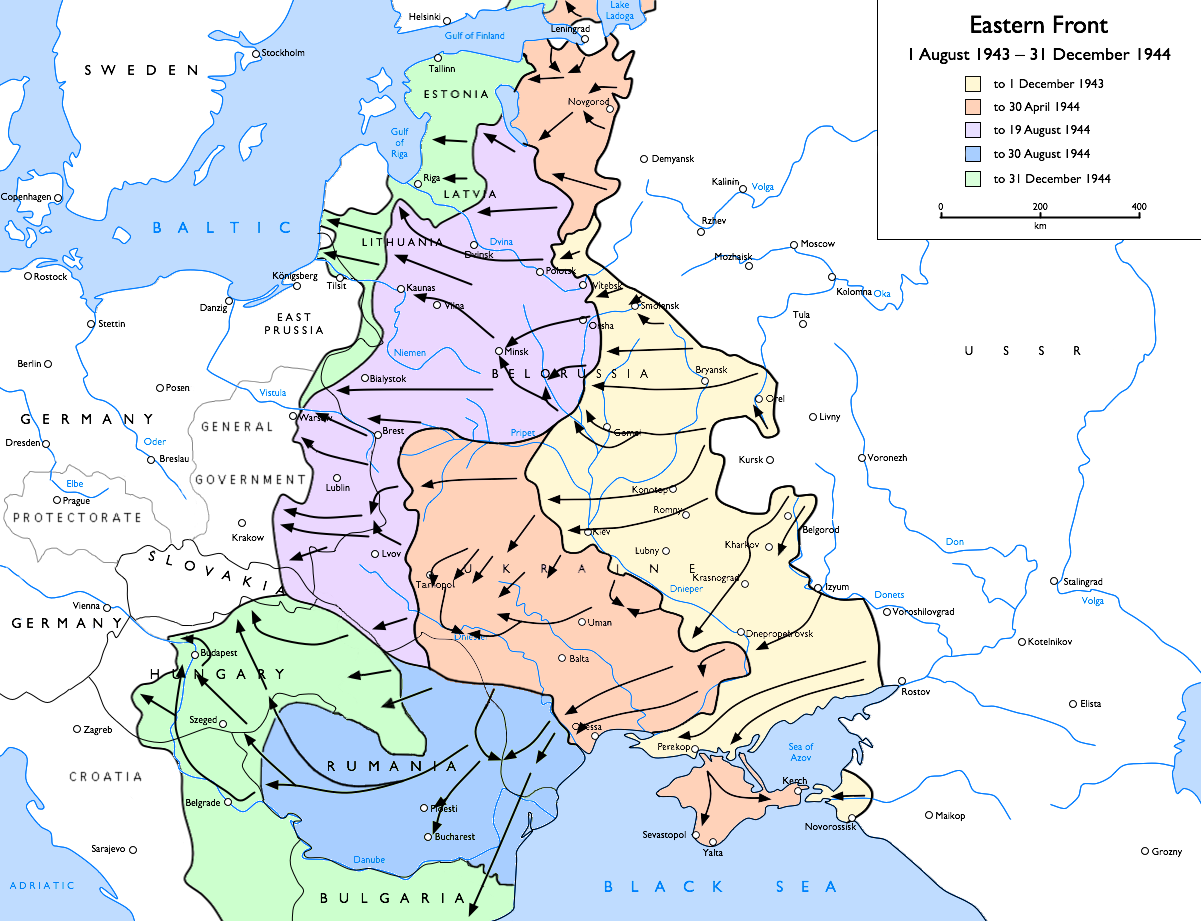
Soviet advances from 1 August 1943 to 31 December 1944: to 1 December 1943 to 30 April 1944 to 19 August 1944 to 30 August 1944 to 31 December 1944

Fight The Germans! No doubt Warsaw already hears the guns of the battle which is soon to bring her liberation ... The Polish Army now entering Polish territory, trained in the Soviet Union, is now joined to the People's Army to form the Corps of the Polish Armed Forces, the armed arm of our nation in its struggle for independence. Its ranks will be joined tomorrow by the sons of Warsaw. They will all together, with the Allied Army pursue the enemy westwards, wipe out the Hitlerite vermin from Polish land and strike a mortal blow at the beast of Prussian Imperialism.

— Moscow Radio Station Kosciuszko, 29 July 1944 broadcast

The role of the Red Army during the Warsaw Uprising remains controversial and is still disputed by historians. The Uprising started when the Red Army appeared on the city's doorstep, and the Poles in Warsaw were counting on Soviet front capturing or forwarding beyond the city in a matter of days. This basic scenario of an uprising against the Germans, launched a few days before the arrival of Allied forces, played out successfully in a number of European capitals, such as Paris and Prague. However, despite the easy capture of an area south-east of Warsaw barely 10 kilometres (6 miles) from the city centre and holding these positions for about 40 days, the Soviets did not extend any effective aid to the resistance within Warsaw. At that time city outskirts were defended by the under-manned and under-equipped German 73rd Infantry Division which was destroyed many times on the Eastern Front and was yet-again being reconstituted. The weak German defence forces did not experience any significant Soviet pressure during that period, which effectively allowed them to strengthen German forces fighting against uprising in the city itself.

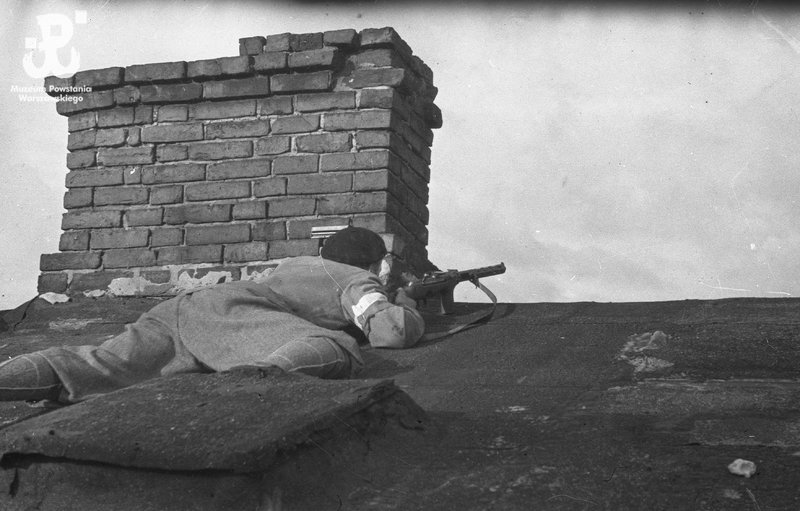
Soldier from the Pięść Battalion led by Stanisław "Agaton" Jankowski, pictured on a rooftop of a house near the Evangelical cemetery in the Wola district of Warsaw, 2 August 1944

The Red Army was fighting intense battles further to the south of Warsaw, to seize and maintain bridgeheads over the Vistula river, and to the north of the city, to gain bridgeheads over the river Narew. The best German armoured divisions were fighting on those sectors. Despite the fact, both of these objectives had been mostly secured by September. Yet the Soviet 47th Army did not move into Praga on the right bank of the Vistula, until 11 September (when the Uprising was basically over). In three days the Soviets quickly gained control of the suburb, a few hundred meters from the main battle on the other side of the river, as the resistance by the German 73rd Division collapsed quickly. Had the Soviets done this in early August, the crossing of the river would have been easier, as the Poles then held considerable stretches of the riverfront. However, by mid-September a series of German attacks had reduced the Poles to holding one narrow stretch of the riverbank, in the district of Czerniaków. The Poles were counting on the Soviet forces to cross to the left bank where the main battle of the uprising was occurring. Though Berling's communist 1st Polish Army did cross the river, their support from the Soviets was inadequate and the main Soviet force did not follow them.

One of the reasons given for the collapse of the Uprising was the reluctance of the Soviet Red Army to help the Polish resistance. On 1 August, the day of Uprising, the Soviet advance was halted by a direct order from the Kremlin. Soon afterwards the Soviet tank units stopped receiving any oil from their depots. Soviets knew of the planned outbreak from their agents in Warsaw and, more importantly, directly from the Polish prime minister Stanisław Mikołajczyk, who informed them of the Polish Home Army uprising plans: The Soviet side was informed post-factum. "The Russians learned about possibility for the first time from Mikolajczyk, at about 9 p.m. on 31 July, that is about 3 hours after Bor-Komorowski had given the order for the insurrection to begin".

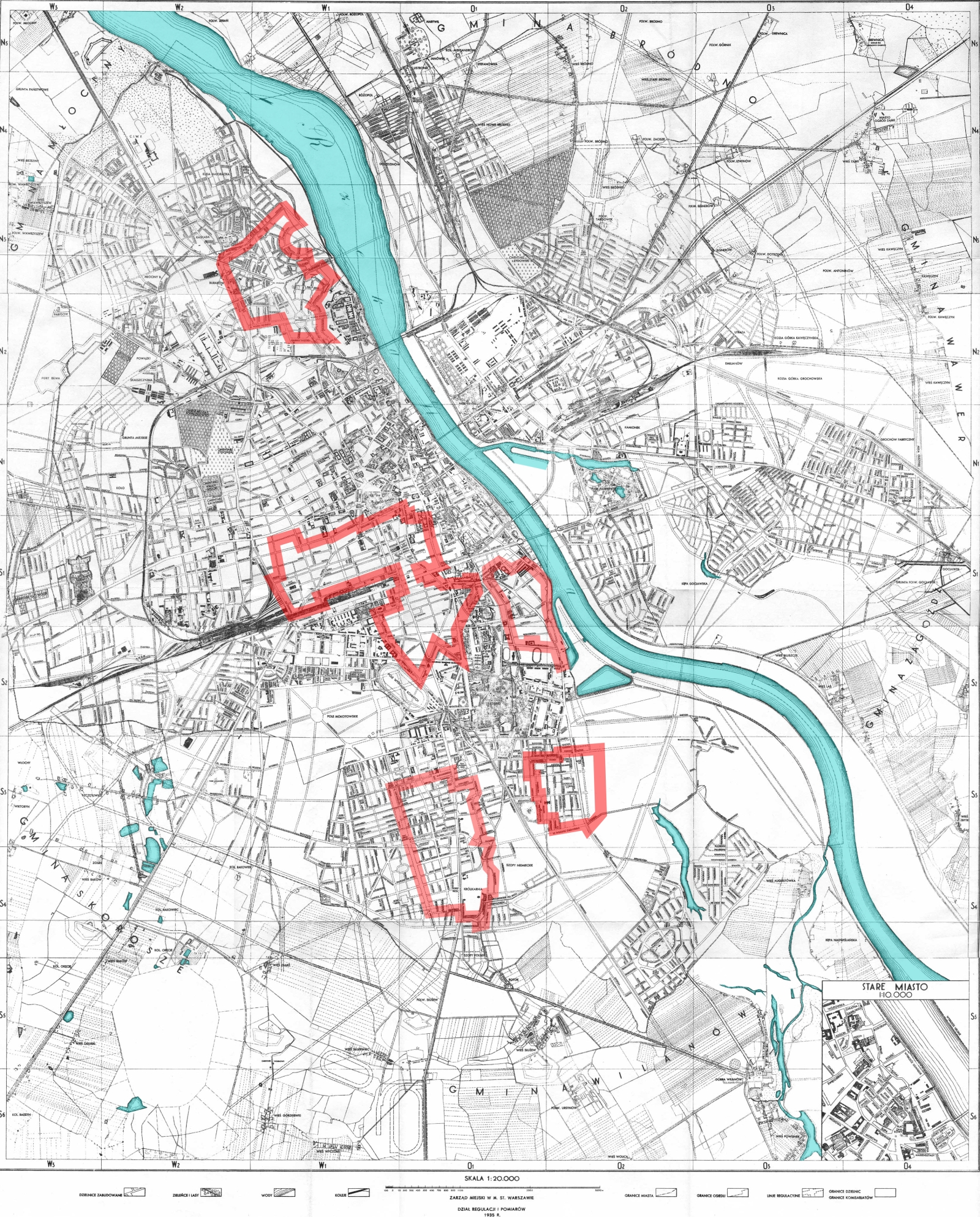
Polish-controlled areas of Warsaw after the fall of the Old Town, around 10 September 1944

One way or the other, the presence of Soviet tanks in nearby Wołomin 15 kilometers to the east of Warsaw had sealed the decision of the Home Army leaders to launch the Uprising. However, as a result of the initial battle of Radzymin in the final days of July, these advance units of the Soviet 2nd Tank Army were pushed out of Wołomin and back about 10 kilometres (6.2 miles). On 9 August, Stalin informed Premier Mikołajczyk that the Soviets had originally planned to be in Warsaw by 6 August, but a counter-attack by four Panzer divisions had thwarted their attempts to reach the city. By 10 August, the Germans had enveloped and inflicted heavy casualties on the Soviet 2nd Tank Army at Wołomin.

On 1 August 1944, the underground Polish Home Army, being in contact with and loyal to the Polish government-in-exile in London, began offensive operations in Warsaw, in an attempt to free the city from the occupying German forces before the Red Army could secure the capital. Zygmunt Berling became the deputy commander of the Polish Army in the USSR on 22 July 1944. With his own army stopped on the Vistula River and facing Warsaw itself, and without first consulting his Soviet superiors, Berling may have independently issued orders to engage the German enemy and to come to the aid of the Polish resistance but it was a small landing without any tactical support from Berling or other Soviet units that could not make a difference in the situation of Warsaw. Yet this behaviour may have caused Berlings' dismissal from his post soon after.

When Stalin and Churchill met face-to-face in October 1944, Stalin told Churchill that the lack of Soviet support was a direct result of a major reverse in the Vistula sector in August, which had to be kept secret for strategic reasons. All contemporary German sources assumed that the Soviets were trying to link up with the resistance, and they believed it was their defence that prevented the Soviet advance rather than a reluctance to advance on the part of the Soviets. Nevertheless, as part of their strategy the Germans published propaganda accusing both the British and Soviets of abandoning the Poles.

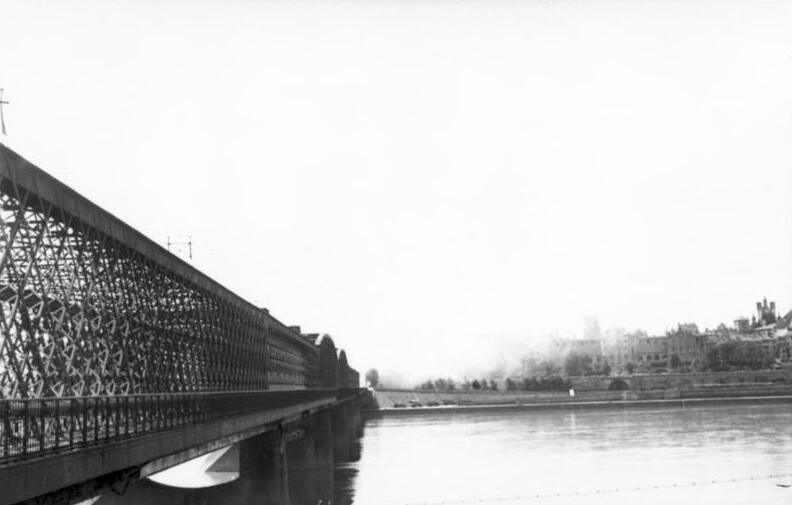
Picture of the Uprising taken from the opposite side of the Vistula river. Kierbedź Bridge viewed from Praga District towards Royal Castle and the Old Town, 1944; the rebels were unable to capture the bridges over the Vistula river and thus lost a light hope of connecting with the Red Army

The Soviet units which reached the outskirts of Warsaw in the final days of July 1944 had advanced from the 1st Belorussian Front in Western Ukraine as part of the Lublin–Brest Offensive, between the Lvov–Sandomierz Offensive on its left and Operation Bagration on its right. These two flanking operations were colossal defeats for the German army and completely destroyed a large number of German formations. As a consequence, the Germans at this time were desperately trying to put together a new force to hold the line of the Vistula, the last major river barrier between the Red Army and Germany proper, rushing in units in various stages of readiness from all over Europe. These included many infantry units of poor quality, and 4–5 high quality Panzer Divisions in the 39th Panzer Corps and 4th SS Panzer Corps pulled from their refits.

Other explanations for Soviet conduct are possible. The Red Army geared for a major thrust into the Balkans through Romania in mid-August and a large proportion of Soviet resources was sent in that direction, while the offensive in Poland was put on hold. Stalin had made a strategic decision to concentrate on occupying Eastern Europe, rather than on making a thrust toward Germany. The capture of Warsaw was not essential for the Soviets, as they had already seized a series of convenient bridgeheads to the south of Warsaw, and were concentrating on defending them against vigorous German counterattacks. Finally, the Soviet High Command may not have developed a coherent or appropriate strategy with regard to Warsaw because they were badly misinformed. Propaganda from the Polish Committee of National Liberation minimized the strength of the Home Army and portrayed them as Nazi sympathizers. Information submitted to Stalin by intelligence operatives or gathered from the frontline was often inaccurate or omitted key details. Possibly because the operatives were unable, due to the harsh political climate, to express opinions or report facts honestly, they "deliberately resorted to writing nonsense".

According to David Glantz (military historian and a retired US Army colonel, as well as a member of the Russian Federation's Academy of Natural Sciences), the Red Army was simply unable to extend effective support to the uprising, which began too early, regardless of Stalin's political intentions. German military capabilities in August – early September were sufficient to halt any Soviet assistance to the Poles in Warsaw, were it intended. In addition, Glantz argued that Warsaw would be a costly city to clear of Germans and an unsuitable location as a start point for subsequent Red Army offensives.

Declassified documents from Soviet archives reveal that Stalin gave instructions to cut off the Warsaw resistance from any outside help. The urgent orders issued to the Red Army troops in Poland on 23 August 1944 stipulated that the Home Army units in Soviet-controlled areas should be prevented from reaching Warsaw and helping the Uprising, their members apprehended and disarmed. Only from mid-September, under pressure from the Western Allies, did the Soviets began to provide some limited assistance to the resistance.

Modern Russian historians generally hold the view that the failure of the uprising in Warsaw was caused primarily by the mistakes of the leadership of the uprising. They argue that in July 1944, according to the Directive of the command, the Soviet troops did not have the goal of attacking Warsaw, but only to the suburbs of Warsaw – Praga with access to the Vistula river line. Since the Soviet command understood that it was unlikely to be possible to capture the bridges over the Vistula and the Germans would blow them up. The Soviet forces aimed to advance in the northern direction with the capture of East Prussia and with the priority task of reaching the line of the Vistula and Narew rivers and capturing bridgeheads. Then the offensive against East Prussia was to begin from these bridgeheads. ("on the West Bank of the Narew river in the area of Pultusk, Serotsk and South and North of Warsaw – on the West Bank of the Vistula river in the area of Demblin, Zvolen, Solec. In the future keep in mind to advance in the General direction of Thorn and Lodz").

According to this argument, the Home Army leadership mistook the left flank of the 2nd Tank army, which was advancing to north, for the vanguard, which was allegedly advancing on Warsaw and the order was given to start the uprising, which led to defeat. Modern Russian historians generally blame this lack of coordination on the Home Army's desire to liberate Warsaw before the Soviets arrived there.

== Aftermath ==
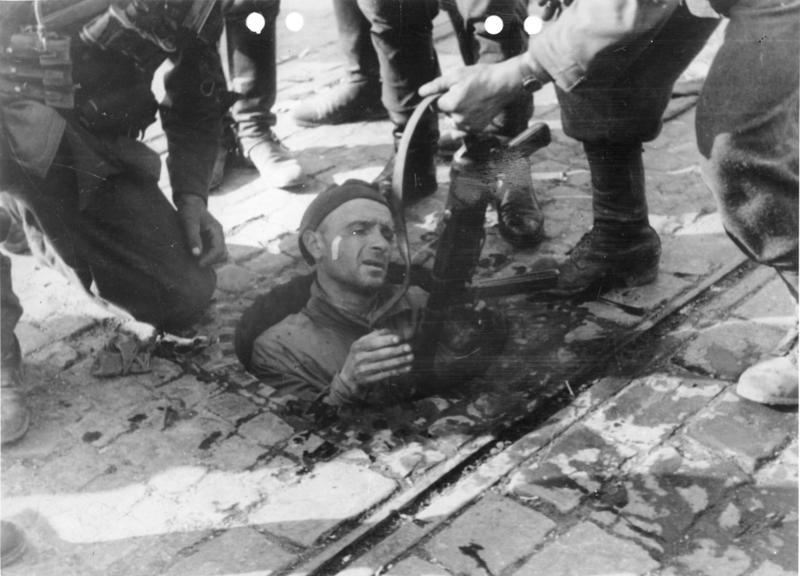
Home Army soldier from the Mokotów District surrenders to German troops.

=== Capitulation ===
The 9th Army has crushed the final resistance in the southern Vistula circle. The resistance fought to the very last bullet.

— German report, 23 September (T 4924/44)

By the first week of September both German and Polish commanders realized that the Soviet army was unlikely to act to break the stalemate. The Germans reasoned that a prolonged Uprising would damage their ability to hold Warsaw as the frontline; the Poles were concerned that continued resistance would result in further massive casualties. On 7 September, General Rohr proposed negotiations, which Bór-Komorowski agreed to pursue the following day. Over 8, 9 and 10 September about 20,000 civilians were evacuated by agreement of both sides, and Rohr recognized the right of Home Army soldiers to be treated as military combatants. The Poles suspended talks on the 11th, as they received news that the Soviets were advancing slowly through Praga. A few days later, the arrival of the 1st Polish army breathed new life into the resistance and the talks collapsed.

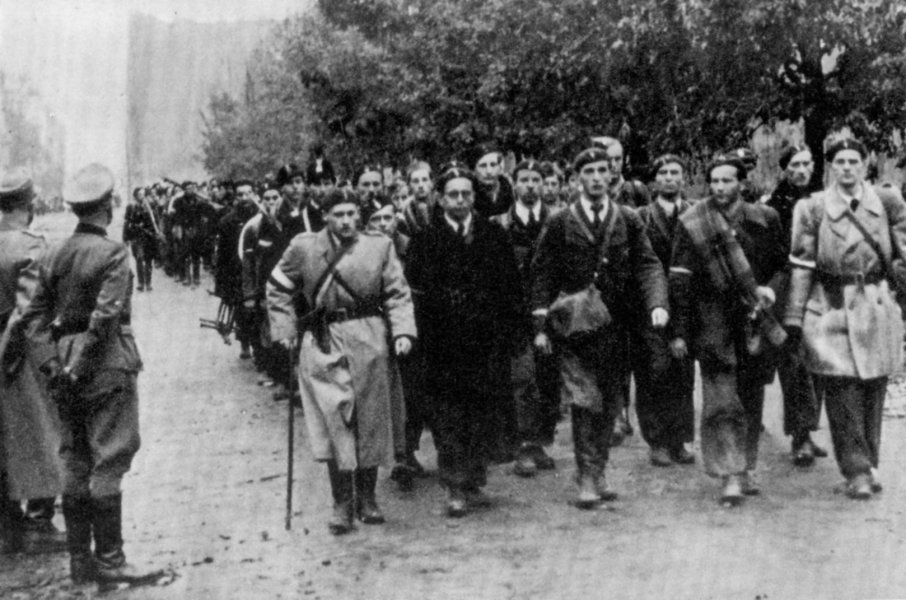
Surrender of the Warsaw Uprising resistance, 5 October 1944

However, by the morning of 27 September, the Germans had retaken Mokotów. Talks restarted on 28 September. In the evening of 30 September, Żoliborz fell to the Germans. The Poles were being pushed back into fewer and fewer streets, and their situation was ever more desperate. On the 30th, Hitler decorated von dem Bach, Dirlewanger and Reinefarth, while in London General Sosnkowski was dismissed as Polish commander-in-chief. Bór-Komorowski was promoted in his place, even though he was trapped in Warsaw. Bór-Komorowski and Prime Minister Mikołajczyk again appealed directly to Rokossovsky and Stalin for a Soviet intervention. None came. According to Soviet Marshal Georgy Zhukov, who was by this time at the Vistula front, both he and Rokossovsky advised Stalin against an offensive because of heavy Soviet losses.

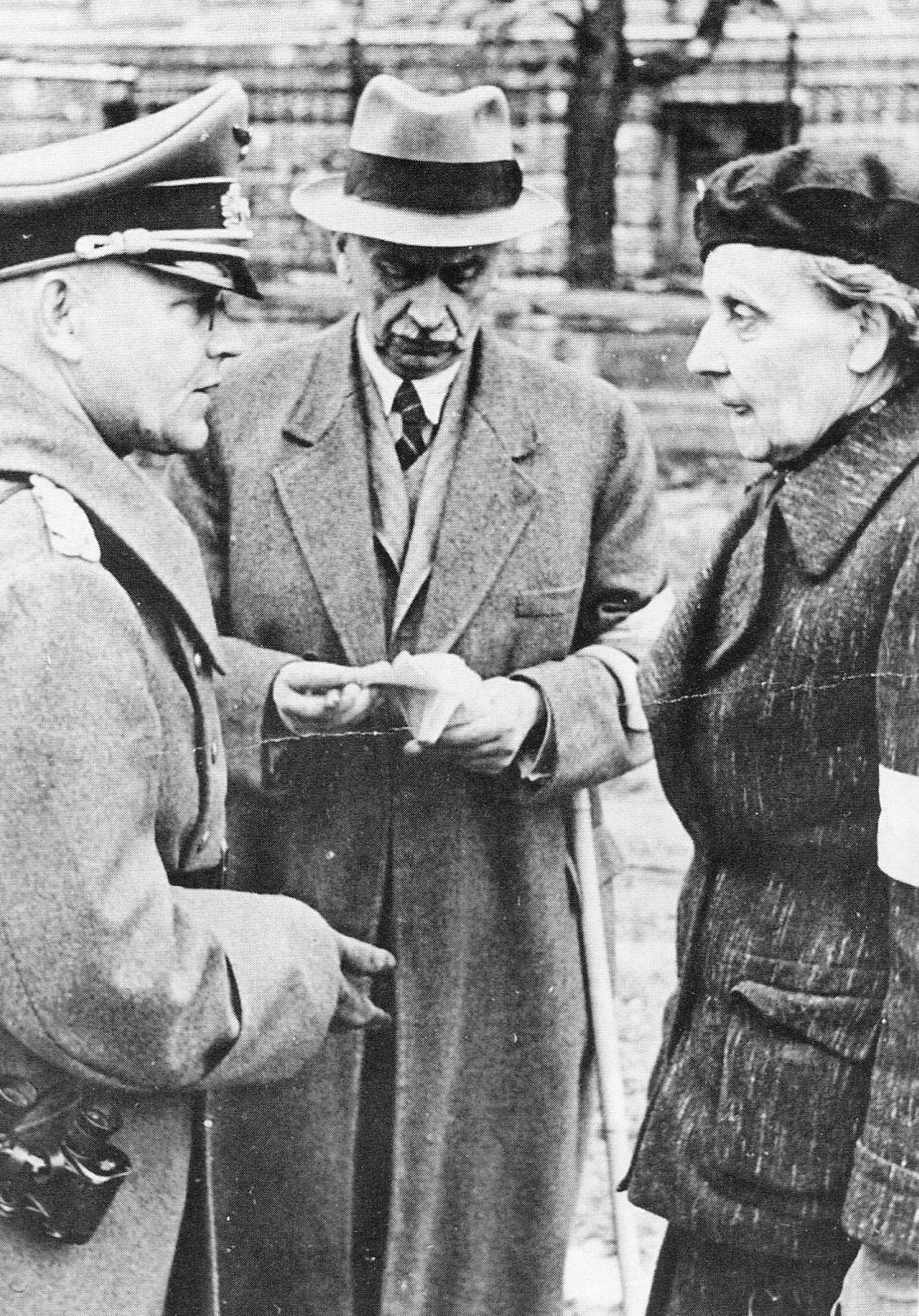
Capitulation talks with General Rohr and Maria Tarnowska

The capitulation order of the remaining Polish forces was finally signed on 2 October. All fighting ceased that evening. According to the agreement, the Wehrmacht promised to treat Home Army soldiers in accordance with the Geneva Convention, and to treat the civilian population humanely.

The next day the Germans began to disarm the Home Army soldiers. They later sent 15,000 of them to POW camps in various parts of Germany. Between 5,000 and 6,000 resistance fighters decided to blend into the civilian population hoping to continue the fight later. The entire civilian population of Warsaw was expelled from the city and sent to a transit camp Durchgangslager 121 in Pruszków. Out of 350,000–550,000 civilians who passed through the camp, 90,000 were sent to labour camps in the Third Reich, 60,000 were shipped to death and concentration camps (including Ravensbrück, Auschwitz, and Mauthausen, among others), while the rest were transported to various locations in the General Government and released.

The Eastern Front remained static in the Vistula sector, with the Soviets making no attempt to push forward, until the Vistula–Oder Offensive began on 12 January 1945. Almost entirely destroyed, Warsaw was liberated from the Germans on 17 January 1945 by the Red Army and the First Polish Army.

=== Destruction of the city ===
The city must completely disappear from the surface of the earth and serve only as a transport station for the Wehrmacht. No stone can remain standing. Every building must be razed to its foundation.

— SS chief Heinrich Himmler, 17 October, SS officers conference

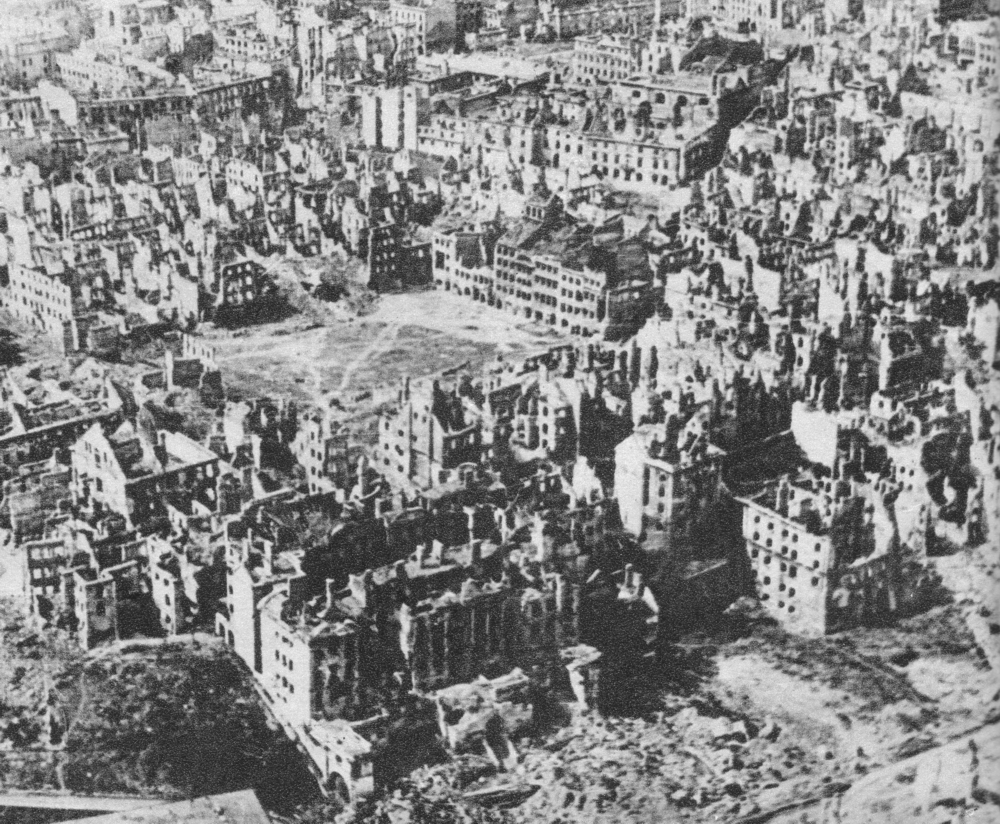
Old Town, Warsaw; after the Warsaw Uprising, 85% of the city was deliberately destroyed by the German forces.

The destruction of the Polish capital was planned before the start of World War II. On 20 June 1939, while Adolf Hitler was visiting an architectural bureau in Würzburg am Main, his attention was captured by a project of a future German town – "Neue deutsche Stadt Warschau". According to the Pabst Plan Warsaw was to be turned into a provincial German city. It was soon included as a part of the great Germanization plan of the East; the genocidal Generalplan Ost. The failure of the Warsaw Uprising provided an opportunity for Hitler to begin the transformation.

After the remaining population had been expelled, the Germans continued the destruction of the city. Special groups of German engineers were dispatched to burn and demolish the remaining buildings. According to German plans, after the war Warsaw was to be turned into nothing more than a military transit station, or even an artificial lake – the latter of which the Nazi leadership had already intended to implement for the Soviet/Russian capital of Moscow in 1941. The Brandkommandos (arson squads) used flamethrowers and Sprengkommandos (demolition squads) explosives to methodically destroy house after house. They paid special attention to historical monuments, Polish national archives and places of interest.

By January 1945, 85% of the buildings were destroyed: 25% as a result of the Uprising, 35% as a result of systematic German actions after the uprising, and the rest as a result of the earlier Warsaw Ghetto Uprising, and the September 1939 campaign. Material losses are estimated at 10,455 buildings, 923 historical buildings (94%), 25 churches, 14 libraries including the National Library, 81 primary schools, 64 high schools, University of Warsaw and Warsaw University of Technology, and most of the historical monuments. Almost a million inhabitants lost all of their possessions. The exact amount of losses of private and public property as well as pieces of art, monuments of science and culture is unknown but considered enormous. Studies done in the late 1940s estimated total damage at about US$30 billion. In 2004, President of Warsaw Lech Kaczyński, later President of Poland, established a historical commission to estimate material losses that were inflicted upon the city by German authorities. The commission estimated the losses as at least US$31.5 billion at 2004 values. Those estimates were later raised to US$45 billion 2004 US dollars and in 2005, to $54.6 billion.

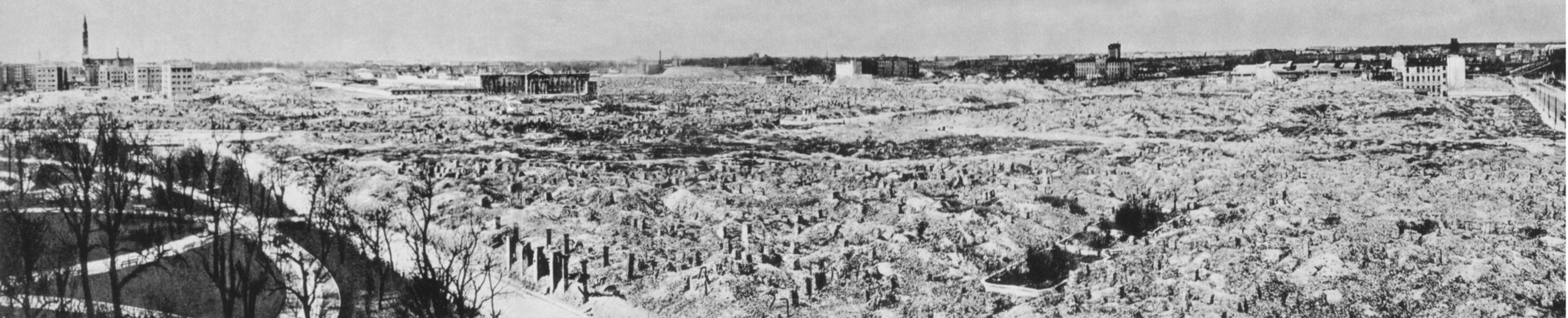
Warsaw c. 1950, still witness to the massive World War II destruction of the city. Northwest view of the Krasiński Gardens and Świętojerska Street.

=== Casualties (including both Uprising civilian soldiers and civilians) ===
The exact number of casualties on both sides is unknown. Estimates of Polish casualties fall into roughly similar ranges.

Side	Civilians	KIA	WIA	MIA	POW
Polish	150,000–200,000	15,200; 16,000; 16,200	5,000; 6,000; 25,000	all declared dead	15,000
German	unknown	2,000 to 17,000	9,000	0 to 7,000	2,000 to 5,000

Estimates of German casualties differ widely. Though the figure of 9,000 German WIA is generally accepted and generates no controversy, there is little agreement as to German irrecoverable losses (KIA+MIA). Until the 1990s the Eastern and the Western historiography stuck to two widely different estimates, the former claiming 17,000 and the latter 2,000. The 17,000 figure was first coined by a 1947 issue of a Warsaw historical journal Dzieje Najnowsze, allegedly based on estimates made by Bach Zelewski when interrogated by his Polish captors (and divided into 10,000 KIA and 7,000 MIA). This figure was initially repeated in West Germany. However, in 1962 a scholarly monograph by Hanns Krannhals coined the 2,000 estimate.

Until the late 20th century the 17,000 figure was consistently and unequivocally quoted in the Polish, though also in the East German and Soviet historiography, be it encyclopedias, scientific monographs or more popular works. It was at times paired or otherwise related to the figure of 16,000 German Warsaw KIA+MIA listed by the so-called Gehlen report of April 1945. The 2,000 figure was accepted in West Germany and generally spilled over to Western historiography; exceptions were studies written in English by the Poles and some other works.

Komorowski, who in 1995 opted for 16,000, changed his mind and 10 years later cautiously subscribed to the 2,000 figure; also scholars like Sawicki and Rozwadowski tentatively followed suit. A popular work of Bączyk, who concludes that 3,000 is the maximum conceivable (though not the most probable) figure. In his 2016 analysis Sowa dismissed the 17,000 figure as "entirely improbable" and suggested that its longevity and popularity resulted from manipulation on part of apologists of the Rising.

In Russian historiography it is given clear preference, be it in encyclopedias and dictionaries or general works; the same opinion might be found in Belarus. The 17,000 estimate made it also to the English literature, quoted with no reservations in popular compendia, warfare manuals and a handful of other works. The figure is advanced also by established institutions like BBC. Other works in English offer a number of approaches; some quote both sides with no own preference, some provide ambiguous descriptions, some set 17,000 irrecoverable losses as an upper limit, some provide odd numbers perhaps resulting from incompetent quotations and some remain silent on the issue altogether, which is the case of the only major English monograph.

A key argument supporting the 17,000 figure – apart from quotations from Bach and Gehlen – are total (KIA+MIA+WIA) losses sustained by Kampfgruppe Dirlewanger, one of a few operational units forming German troops fighting the Poles. They are currently calculated at some 3,500; if extrapolated, they might support the overall 25,000 German casualty estimate.

=== After the war ===
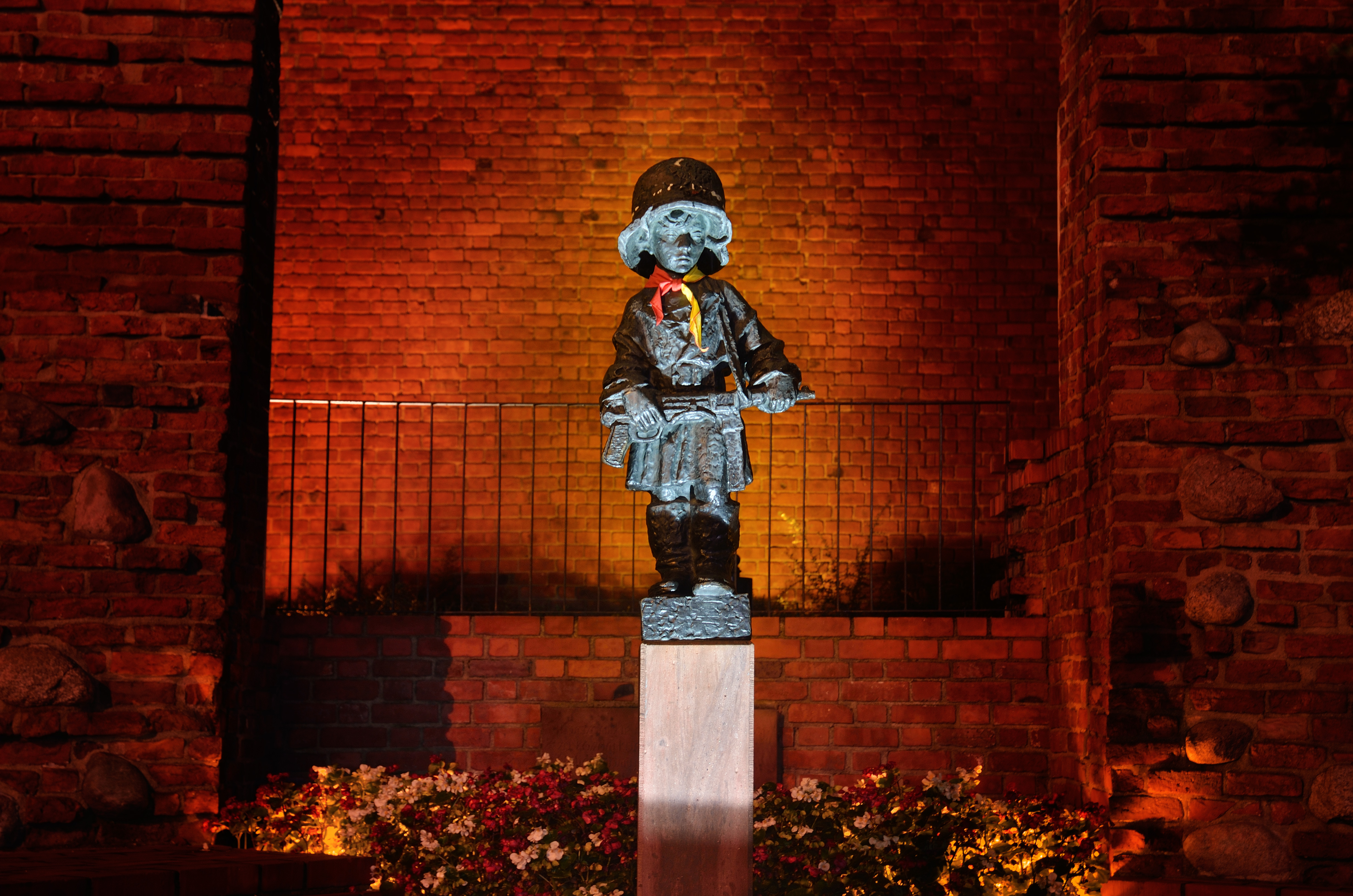
Mały Powstaniec ("Little Insurrectionist") Monument erected just outside Warsaw's medieval city walls in 1981, commemorates the children who fought in the Warsaw Uprising, against the German occupation.

I want to protest against the mean and cowardly attitude adopted by the British press towards the recent rising in Warsaw. ... One was left with the general impression that the Poles deserved to have their bottoms smacked for doing what all the Allied wirelesses had been urging them to do for years past,. ... First of all, a message to English left-wing journalists and intellectuals generally: 'Do remember that dishonesty and cowardice always have to be paid for. Don't imagine that for years on end you can make yourself the boot-licking propagandist of the Soviet régime, or any other régime, and then suddenly return to mental decency. Once a whore, always a whore.'

— George Orwell, 1 September 1944

By deciding to act without co-ordinating their plans with the Soviet High Command, authors of the insurrection assumed heavy responsibility for the fate of Warsaw and greatly contributed to the ensuing tragedy of this city and its people. They failed to realise that a badly armed Home Army could not, in the summer of 1944 successfully do battle with the Germans while simultaneously trying to oppose the Russians and the Polish Communists politically. Bor-Komorowski's and Jankowski's plans were too complicated and too hazardous to succeed in the existing political and military situation'

— Jan. M. Ciechanowski, Historian, participant of the Warsaw uprising.

Most soldiers of the Home Army (including those who took part in the Warsaw Uprising) were persecuted after the war; captured by the NKVD or UB political police. They were interrogated and imprisoned on various charges, such as that of fascism. Many of them were sent to Gulags, executed or disappeared. Between 1944 and 1956, all of the former members of Battalion Zośka were incarcerated in Soviet prisons. In March 1945, a staged trial of 16 leaders of the Polish Underground State held by the Soviet Union took place in Moscow – (the Trial of the Sixteen). The Government Delegate, together with most members of the Council of National Unity and the C-i-C of the Armia Krajowa, were invited by Soviet general Ivan Serov with agreement of Joseph Stalin to a conference on their eventual entry to the Soviet-backed Provisional Government.

They were presented with a warrant of safety, yet they were arrested in Pruszków by the NKVD on 27 and 28 March. Leopold Okulicki, Jan Stanisław Jankowski and Kazimierz Pużak were arrested on the 27th with 12 more the next day. A. Zwierzynski had been arrested earlier. They were brought to Moscow for interrogation in the Lubyanka. After several months of brutal interrogation and torture, they were presented with the forged accusations of collaboration with Nazis and planning a military alliance with Germany. Many resistance fighters, captured by the Germans and sent to POW camps in Germany, were later liberated by British, American and Polish forces and remained in the West. Among those were the leaders of the uprising Tadeusz Bór-Komorowski and Antoni Chruściel.

The Soviet government labelled all S.S. Sturmbrigade R.O.N.A. Russkaya Osvoboditelnaya Narodnaya Armiya soldiers as traitors, and those who were repatriated were tried and sentenced to detention in Soviet prisons or executed. In the 1950s and 1960s in the USSR, dozens of other former R.O.N.A. members were found, some of them also sentenced to death.

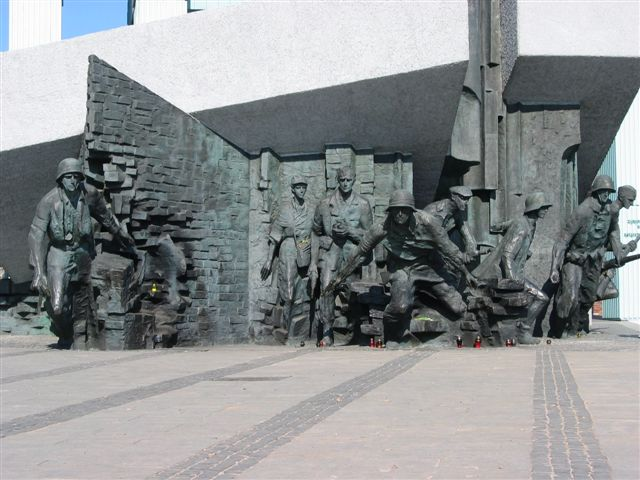
Monument to the resistance fighters who fought in the Warsaw Uprising.

The facts of the Warsaw Uprising were inconvenient to Stalin, and were twisted by propaganda of the People's Republic of Poland, which stressed the failings of the Home Army and the Polish government-in-exile, and forbade all criticism of the Red Army or the political goals of Soviet strategy. In the immediate post-war period, the very name of the Home Army was censored, and most films and novels covering the 1944 Uprising were either banned or modified so that the name of the Home Army did not appear. From the 1950s on, Polish propaganda depicted the soldiers of the Uprising as brave, but the officers as treacherous, reactionary and characterized by disregard of the losses. The first publications on the topic taken seriously in the West were not issued until the late 1980s. In Warsaw no monument to the Home Army was built until 1989. Instead, efforts of the Soviet-backed People's Army were glorified and exaggerated.

By contrast, in the West the story of the Polish fight for Warsaw was told as a tale of valiant heroes fighting against a cruel and ruthless enemy. It was suggested that Stalin benefited from Soviet non-involvement, as opposition to eventual Soviet control of Poland was effectively eliminated when the Nazis destroyed the partisans. The belief that the Uprising failed because of deliberate procrastination by the Soviet Union contributed to anti-Soviet sentiment in Poland. Memories of the Uprising helped to inspire the Polish labour movement Solidarity, which led a peaceful opposition movement against the Communist government during the 1980s.

=== 1989 to present ===
In December 1989, the Polish Constitution was revised to remove reference to the socialist order. Marxist references from the Soviet occupation were removed and the name of the country was changed back to the Polish Republic. For the first time since 1944, the Warsaw Uprising could be discussed, researched, and memorialized.

Numerous issues have made research into the Warsaw Uprising difficult. Understanding was boosted by the revolutions of 1989 due to the abolition of censorship and increased access to state archives. Yet access to some material in British, Polish and ex-Soviet archives was still restricted, with some records still classified. According to the British Government, other records of the Polish government were destroyed.

On 1 August 1994, Poland held a ceremony commemorating the 50th anniversary of the Uprising to which both the German and Russian presidents were invited. Guests included German president Roman Herzog and U.S. vice president Al Gore. The Russian president Boris Yeltsin declined the invitation. At the event, Herzog, on behalf of Germany, was the first German statesman to apologize for German atrocities committed against the Polish nation during the Uprising. During the 60th anniversary of the Uprising in 2004, official delegations included German chancellor Gerhard Schröder, UK deputy prime minister John Prescott and US secretary of state Colin Powell; Pope John Paul II sent a letter to the mayor of Warsaw, Lech Kaczyński, on this occasion. Russia again did not send a representative. A day before, 31 July 2004, the Warsaw Uprising Museum opened in Warsaw.

== Warsaw Uprising Memorial Day ==
Efforts by President Lech Kaczyński in 2009 led to recognition of 1 August as a State holiday, Narodowy Dzień Pamięci Powstania Warszawskiego.

The preamble of the act reads:

In honour of the heroes of the Warsaw Uprising - those who, in defence of the state, fought for the liberation of the capital city with weapons in their hands, strived to recreate the institutions of an independent Polish state, opposed the German occupation and the spectre of Soviet slavery threatening the next generations of Poles

A moment of silence is observed at 5:00 pm to symbolize the sires of 1 August 1944 at 5:00pm that marked the start of the battle as a signal to resistance fighters. Torches get lit in Warsaw's main square amidst rows of national white and red flags while honorary guards at the Tomb of the Unknown Soldier at Piłsudski Square present arms. Varsovians light firecrackers. Past memorials observers have linked arms to form a human kotwica in front of the Royal Castle.

== Photo gallery ==
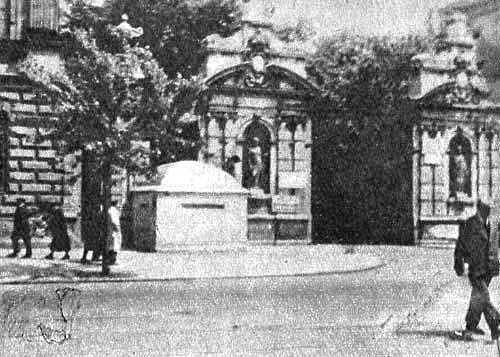
Bunker in front of gate to University of Warsaw converted to a base for Wehrmacht viewed from Krakowskie Przedmieście Street, July 1944

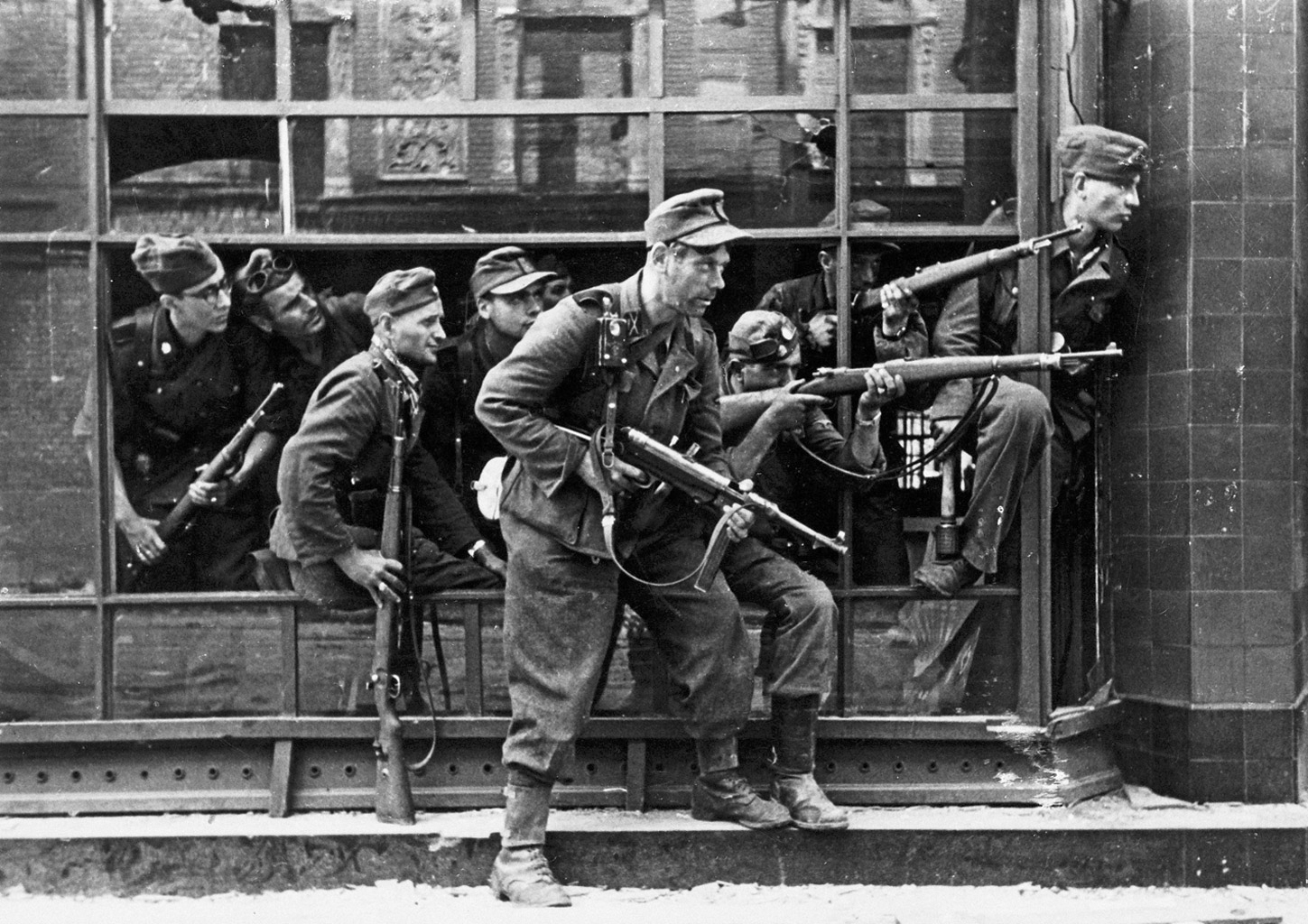
Members of the SS-Sonderregiment Dirlewanger fighting in Warsaw, pictured in window of a townhouse at Focha Street, August 1944

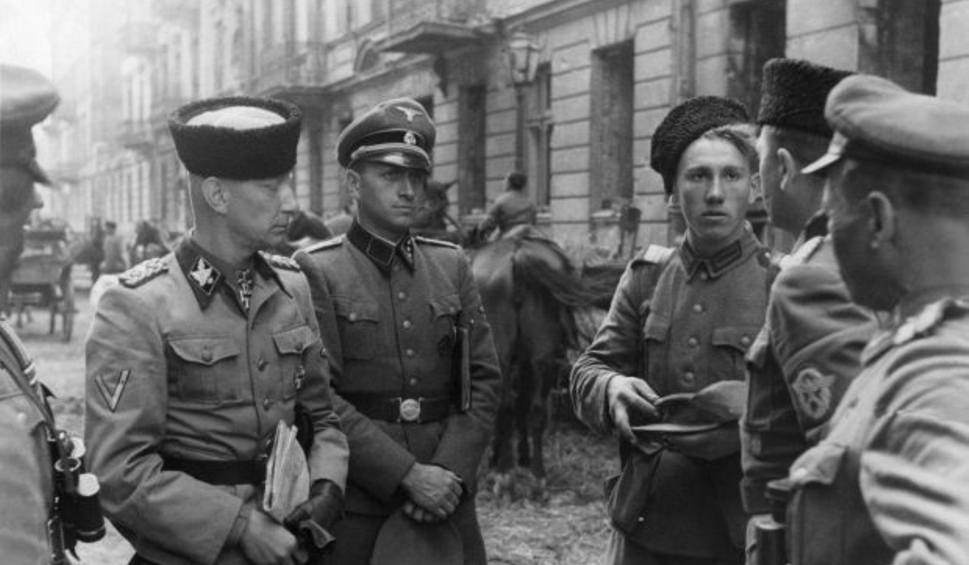
German SS-Gruppenführer Heinz Reinefarth, the "Butcher of Wola" (left, in Cossack headgear) with Jakub Bondarenko, commander of Kuban Cossack Infantry regiment, Warsaw Uprising

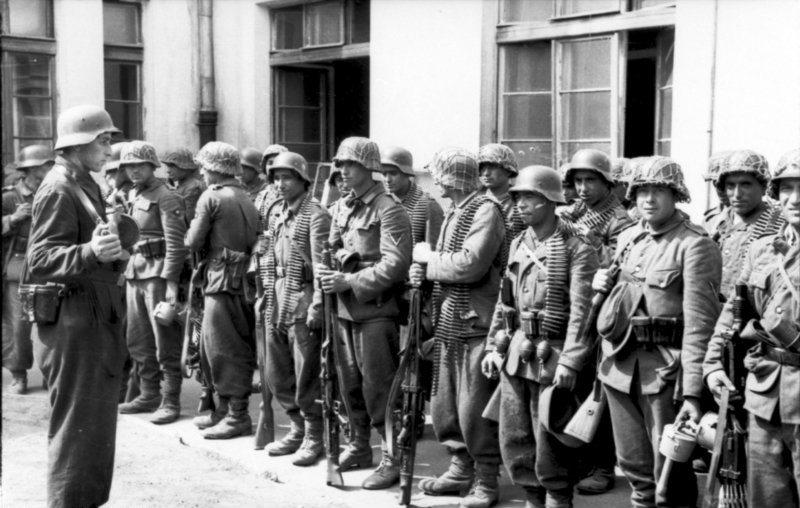
Well-armed soldiers of the "Dönmec" battalion, an Azerbaijani SS volunteer formation during the Warsaw Uprising

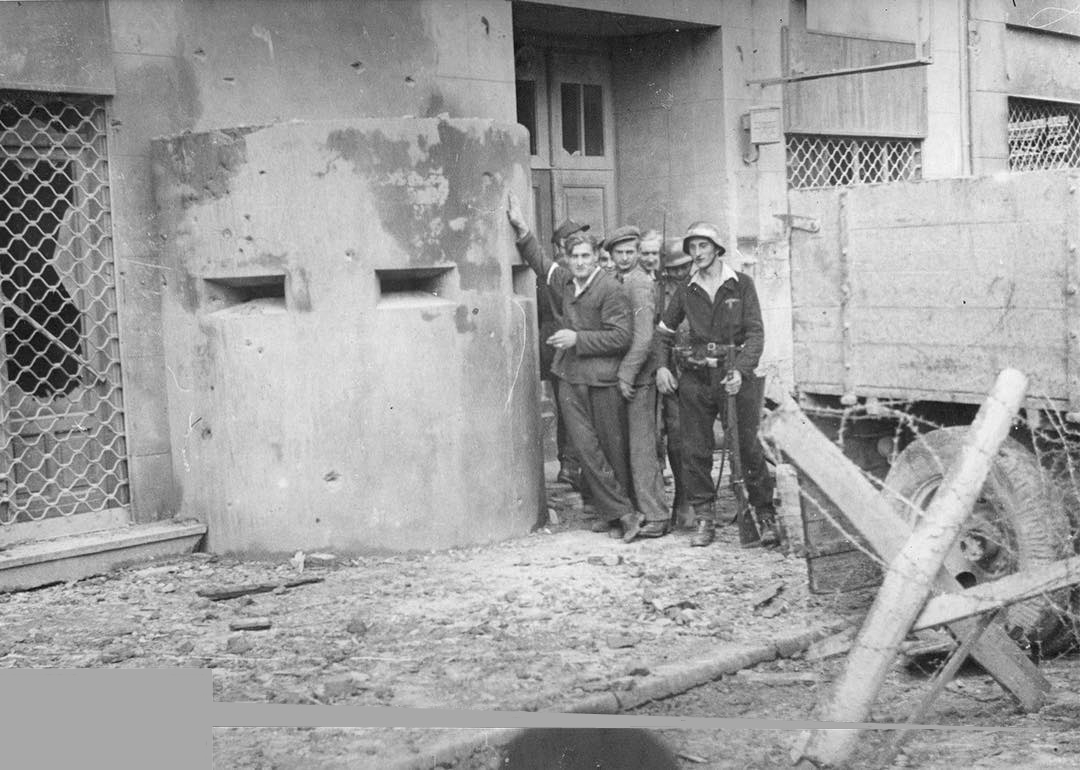
Resistance fighters from "Chrobry I" Battalion in front of German police station "Nordwache" at the junction of Chłodna and Żelazna Streets, 3 August 1944; only one rebel has a weapon

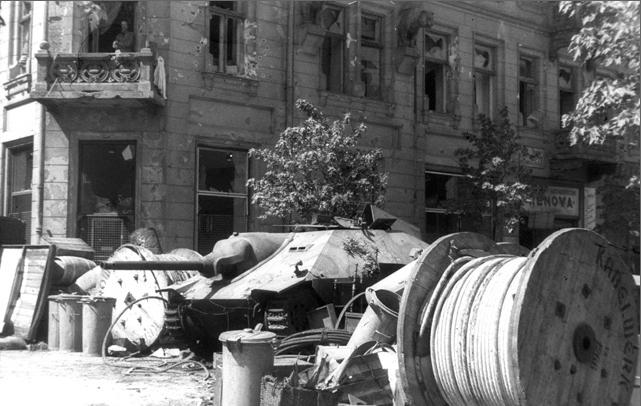
Barricade erected such on Napoleon Square. In background: captured Hetzer tank destroyer. 3 August 1944

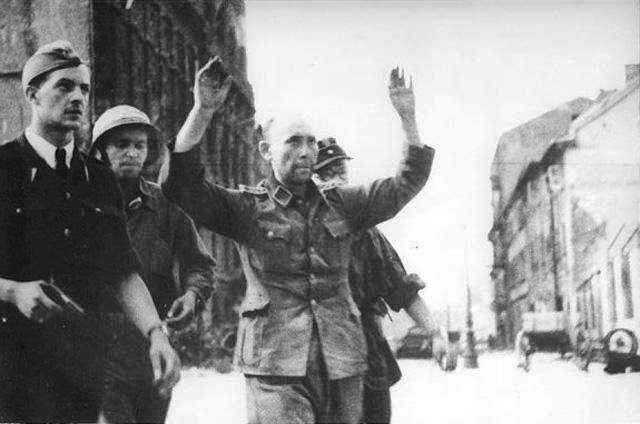
One of the German POWs captured during the fighting at the PAST building located on Zielna Street, 20 August 1944

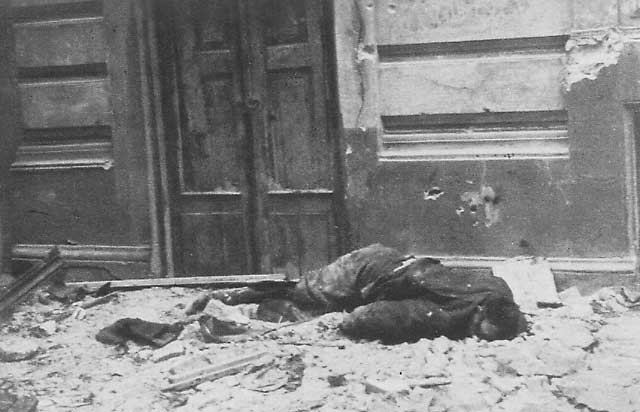
German soldier killed by the resistance during the attack on Mała PAST building. 23 August 1944

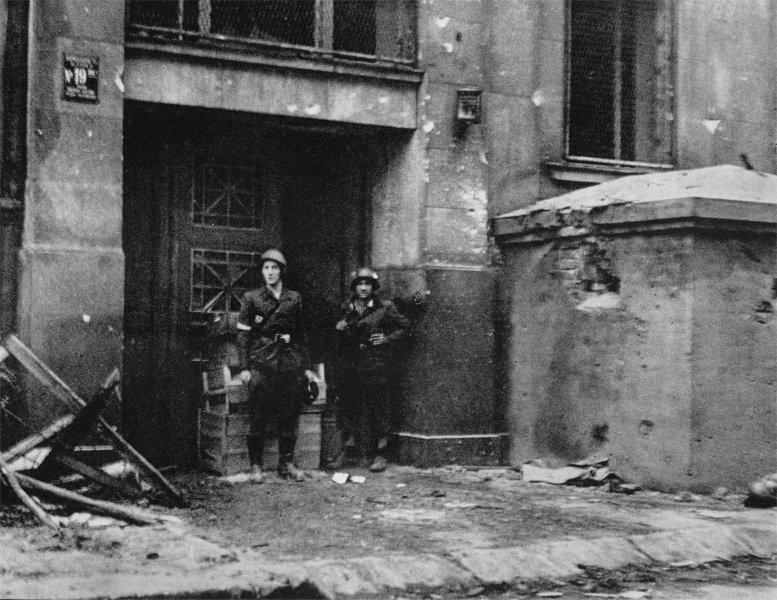
Home Army soldiers from "Ruczaj" Battalion (after a fire fight for the Mała PAST building) take pictures at the main entrance at Piusa Street next to a bunker, 24 August 1944

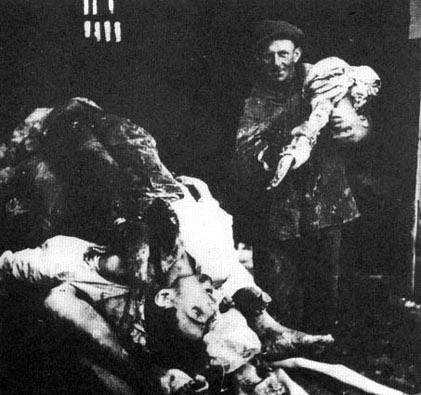
Polish victims of the Wola massacre burned by members of Verbrennungskommando.

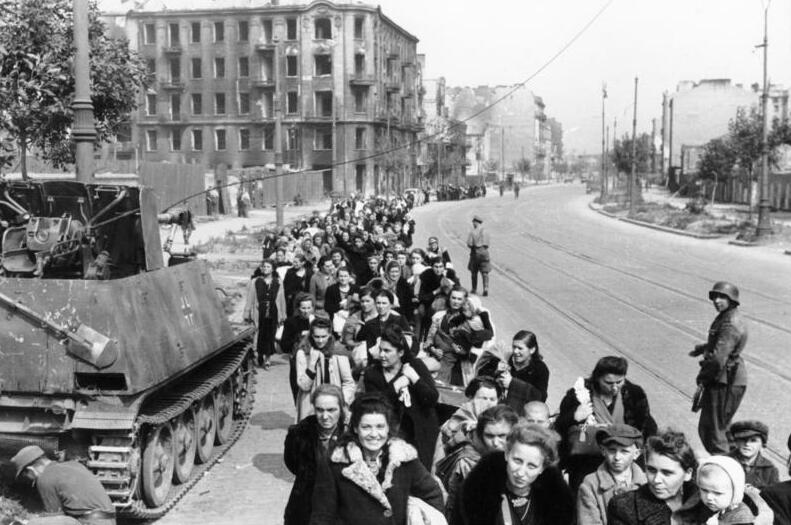
People of Wola leaving the city after the uprising

== Popular culture: music, television and cinema ==
Numerous works have been influenced by and devoted to the Uprising. In literature, they include: Kolumbowie. Rocznik 20 novel by Polish writer Roman Bratny.

In television, they include documentary film The Ramparts of Warsaw 1943–44, produced for the 70th anniversary of the Warsaw Uprising with support from the European Commission. The Warsaw Uprising is often confused with the revolt in the Warsaw Ghetto which took place a year earlier in the spring of 1943. Three young Europeans, Alexandra (France), Maria (Poland) and Roman (Germany) meet in Warsaw to enquire into these events; here they meet witnesses who took part in the Warsaw Uprising or lived in the ghetto. Beneath their white hair we can recognise the men and women who formed the living ramparts of freedom in the face of Nazism. Meanwhile, the Polish World War II TV drama series Time of Honor (Czas honoru; Series 7), which aired in 2014, was entirely devoted to the Warsaw Uprising.

In cinema, they include:

- Kanał, a 1956 Polish film directed by Andrzej Wajda. It was the first film made about the Warsaw Uprising, telling the story of a company of Home Army resistance fighters escaping the Nazi onslaught through the city's sewers.
- A 2014 film, Warsaw Uprising, directed by Jan Komasa and produced by the Warsaw Uprising Museum, was created entirely from restored and colourised film footage taken during the uprising. Komasa followed this up with Warsaw 44 (also known as Miasto 44, "City 44"), a story of love, friendship and the pursuit of adventure during the bloody and brutal reality of the uprising, which was a huge box office success in Poland in 2014.
- Roman Polanski's film The Pianist also briefly shows the uprising through the eyes of its main character Władysław Szpilman. Polish director Małgorzata Brama stated he intends to shoot a docudrama about the Warsaw Uprising.
- Niki Caro's 2017 film The Zookeeper's Wife depicts the Warsaw Uprising and Jan Żabiński's participation in it. At the end of the film, the viewer is informed that Warsaw was destroyed during the war and that only six percent of the Polish capital's prewar population was still in the city after the uprising.
- Warsaw, a 2019 turn-based tactical role-playing videogame developed and published by Polish studio Pixelated Milk, set during the uprising.
- The second film of Yuri Ozerov's epic Soldiers of Freedom of 1977 is mostly devoted to the uprising in Warsaw. The presentation of historical events is given from the Soviet point of view.

== Notable people ==
- Stanisław Bóbr-Tylingo (1919–2001), Polish-born historian
- Maria Cetys (1914–1944), Polish teacher and member of the Home Army whose final words inspired the Warsaw Uprising: Outline of military activities 1944 by Adam Borkiewicz

== See also ==
- Chronicles of Terror
- Cross of the Warsaw Uprising
- Kraków Uprising (1944)
- Liberation of Warsaw concentration camp
- Monument to Victims of the Wola Massacre
- Nazi war crimes during the Warsaw Uprising
- Ochota massacre
- Polish contribution to World War II
- Polish material losses during World War II
- Robinson Crusoes of Warsaw
- Tchorek plaques
- Verbrennungskommando Warschau
- Wola massacre
- Wola Massacre Memorial on Górczewska Street
- Participation of Ukrainians in the suppression of the Warsaw Uprising
- Executions in Warsaw's police district
- Explosion of the tank-trap in Warsaw
