= Liberation of Warsaw concentration camp =

- Part of World War II, Warsaw Uprising
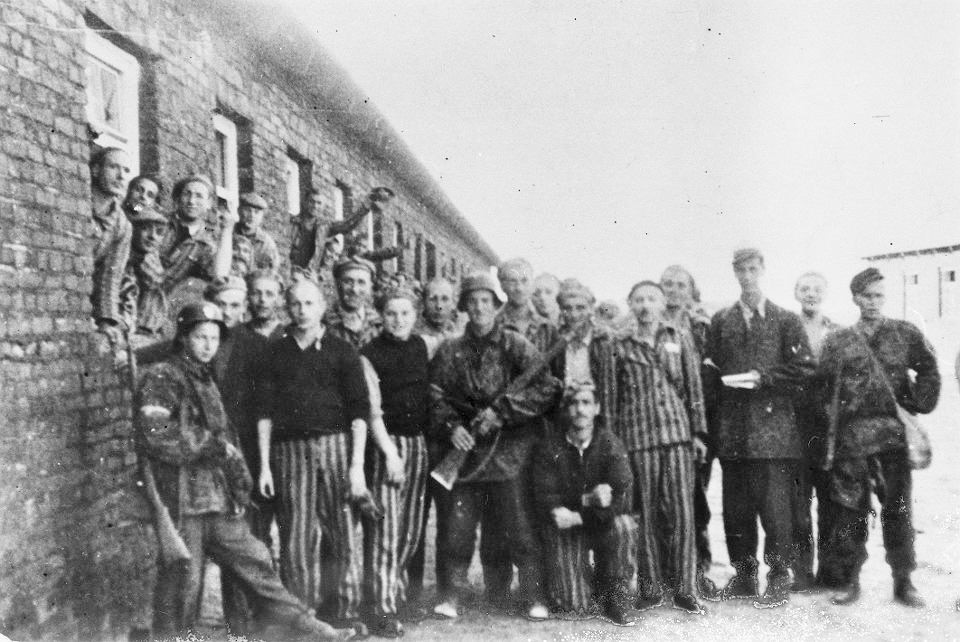
- Home Army soldiers among the liberated prisoners of Warsaw concentration camp
Date	5 August 1944
Location	Muranów, Warsaw 52°14′58″N 20°59′34″E
Result	Polish victory and liberation of 348 Jewish prisoners

Belligerents
Poland	Germany

Commanders and leaders
Ryszard Białous	Unknown

Units involved
2 infantry companies 1 tank	About 90 SS men

Casualties and losses
2 killed 1 wounded	At least 8 killed

The liberation of Warsaw concentration camp, also known as the liberation of Gęsiówka, was a successful assault on the Nazi Warsaw concentration camp (popularly known as Gęsiówka) carried out by the Zośka Battalion of the Home Army on 5 August 1944, on the fifth day of the Warsaw Uprising.

The aim of the Polish attack was to free the prisoners and establish a connection between Wola and the Old Town. The strong German defences were broken thanks to the use of a captured Panther tank. At a cost of minor casualties, the Home Army soldiers captured Gęsiówka and liberated 348 Jews, most of whom joined the uprising.

== Origins ==
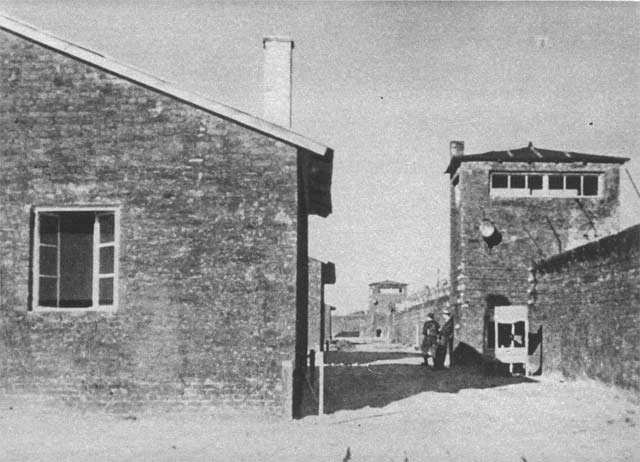
Barracks and watchtowers of Warsaw concentration camp

The concentration camp in Warsaw (German: Konzentrationslager Warschau) was established in July 1943 on the site of the former Warsaw Ghetto. It occupied a rectangular area bounded by Ludwik Zamenhof Street to the east, Gęsia Street to the south, Okopowa Street to the west, and Gliniana, Ostrowska, and Wołyńska streets to the north. The buildings of the pre-war Military Investigation Prison on 1 Gęsia Street were adapted for the needs of the camp. It was commonly referred to as Gęsiówka, and the population of Warsaw also began to use this name to refer to the Warsaw concentration camp.

At least 7,250 prisoners passed through the camp. Almost all of them, except for around 300 German criminals sent to serve as functionary prisoners, were Jews from various European countries. (Note: The Germans deliberately sought to place Jews from various European countries in Warsaw concentration camp, as they hoped that the language barrier would prevent them from making contact with Warsaw residents. As a result, only a small number of Polish Jews ended up in the camp (Kopka (2007, p. 53)).) Prisoners were forced to work on dismantling the ruins of the ghetto and on collecting and sorting any valuables still found on its premises. The camp and the adjacent ruins were also used by the Germans as a place of executions. Polish political prisoners, victims of roundups, and Jews caught on the "Aryan side" were shot there en masse. The total number of victims of Warsaw concentration camp is estimated at approximately 20,000.

In the summer of 1944, with the Red Army approaching, the Germans began evacuating Warsaw's prisons and camps. On 27 July, the commander of the Warsaw concentration camp's guards, SS-Unterscharführer Heinz Villain, ordered all prisoners who felt too weak to endure a march on foot to report to the camp infirmary. The SS men supposedly promised to provide the sick and exhausted Jews with transport in horse-drawn carts. In reality, all those who reported as unfit for the march were shot. The patients in the infirmary were murdered along with them, bringing the total number killed to around 400. The following day, almost 4,000 Jews were marched on foot towards Kutno. During the three-day march, they received no water or food, and the camp guards murdered anyone who lacked the strength to continue walking or who reacted too slowly to orders. Those who survived this death march were loaded into freight wagons and transported to the Dachau concentration camp. In total, up to 2,000 prisoners of the Warsaw concentration camp may have died during the evacuation.

Approximately 400 prisoners remained in the Warsaw concentration camp, whom the Germans intended to use for final cleanup work. This group consisted not only of the existing prisoners of the camp, but also of between 38 and 100 Polish Jews (including women), who were brought there on 28 July from the nearby Pawiak prison.

== First days of the uprising ==
On 1 August 1944, the Home Army launched an uprising against the Germans in Warsaw. The task of capturing Pawiak and the camp on Gęsia Street was assigned to the Łukasiński Battalion, but the attack carried out by its soldiers at the "W" Hour ended in failure.

At the same time, fighting broke out on Okopowa Street, adjacent to the western border of the camp. The Radosław Group – an elite unit of the Home Army that included, among others, units of the Home Army High Command's Kedyw – was operating there. At the "W" Hour, the Zośka Battalion, which belonged to the group, managed to capture the fortified barracks in the school at the corner of 55A Okopowa and St. Kinga streets without major losses, also occuping the nearby Jewish Cemetery and the Pfeiffer tannery at 58/72 Okopowa Street. At the same time, a Kedyw unit of the Warsaw District (known as Kolegium A), commanded by Lieutenant Stanisław Janusz Sosabowski, codenamed Stasinek, captured the large Waffen-SS warehouses on Stawki Street and the school at Niska Street. Stasinek's soldiers (Note: Two Jewish Home Army soldiers, Stanisław Aronson and Stanisław Likiernik, took part in the attack on the warehouses on Stawki Street (Engelking & Libionka (2009, p. 108)).) liberated about 50 Jews who had been sent that day from Warsaw concentration camp to load goods. (Note: According to other sources, the number of liberated prisoners was as high as 100. Most of them were Hungarian Jews (Borkiewicz (2018, p. 179)).) Almost all of those freed immediately expressed their willingness to join the uprising.

On the evening of 1 August, soldiers from the Alek Platoon of the Zośka Battalion conducted reconnaissance in front of Warsaw concentration camp. They discovered that the German garrison had abandoned the barracks and watchtowers on Okopowa Street, withdrawing deeper into the camp. Polish soldiers took advantage of this and occupied the corner watchtower and the ruins of the ghetto between Gęsia and Pawia streets. That same night, they also set fire to the camp barracks on Okopowa Street to illuminate the approaches to the Polish positions.

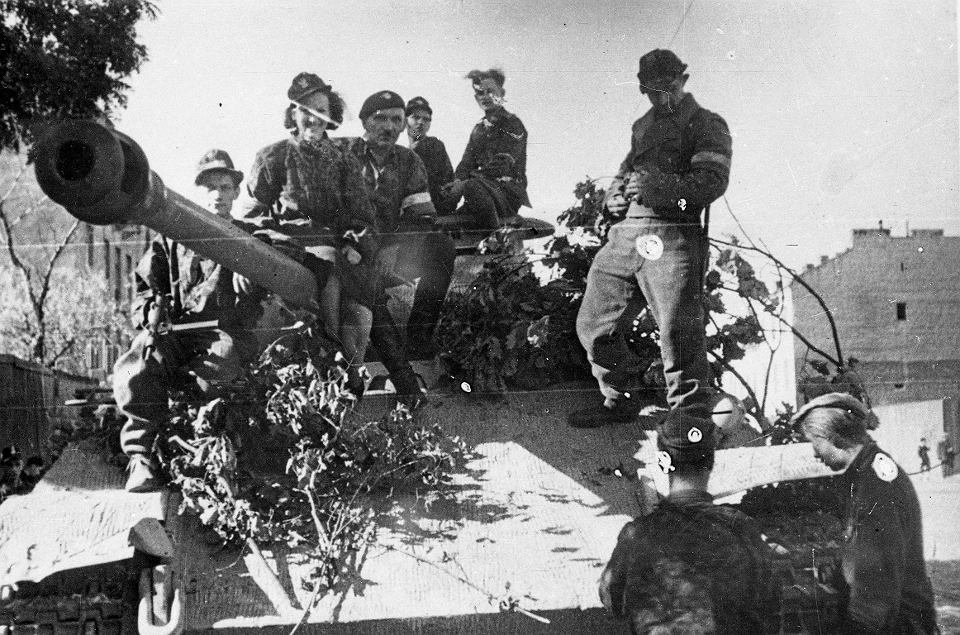
Captured Panther tank belonging to the Wacek Platoon

On the morning of 2 August, soldiers from the Radosław Group captured two German Panther tanks that had ventured into Okopowa Street. This success – combined with the capture of a German truck loaded with tank ammunition by soldiers of the Parasol Battalion – made it possible to form an insurgent armored platoon under the command of Lieutenant Wacław Micuta, codenamed Wacek. The newly formed subunit was incorporated into the Zośka Battalion.

On 3 August, patrols from the Zośka Battalion ventured deep into Gęsiówka several times. During a raid on the camp buildings on Gliniana Street, a skirmish broke out in which Tadeusz Tyczyński, codenamed Pudel, was killed. In his honor, one of the captured tanks was named "Pudel". (Note: Nevertheless, its crew called it "Magda" (Borkiewicz (2018, p. 241)).) That same evening, another soldier from the Zośka Battalion, Andrzej Długoszowski, codenamed Długi, was mortally wounded near Gęsia Street.

The Polish command was aware that the existence of strong German outposts in the former ghetto threatened to cut off the Radosław Group in the event of a collapse of the Polish defense in Wola. In the late afternoon of 4 August, Miotła and Zośka battalions, supported by the Wacek Platoon, launched an attack on German strongpoints in the area of Żelazna Street (building no. 103 at the Befehlstelle, the Sisters of Mercy facility, and the school at the corner of Żelazna and Leszno streets). However, the attack, led by Major Wacław Janaszek, codenamed Bolek, ended in failure, mainly due to a lack of coordination from Polish units operating in the area of Leszno Street. They did not launch their attack until the evening, after the collapse of the Radosław Group's offensive.

== Liberation of the camp ==
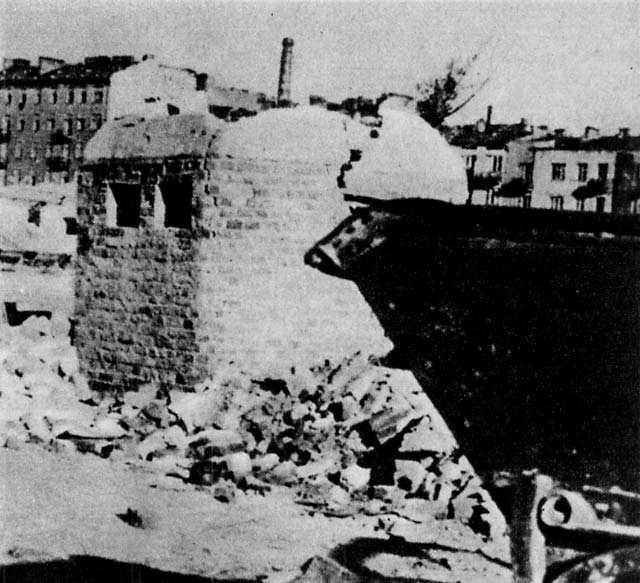
Bunker destroyed by fire from the insurgents' tank

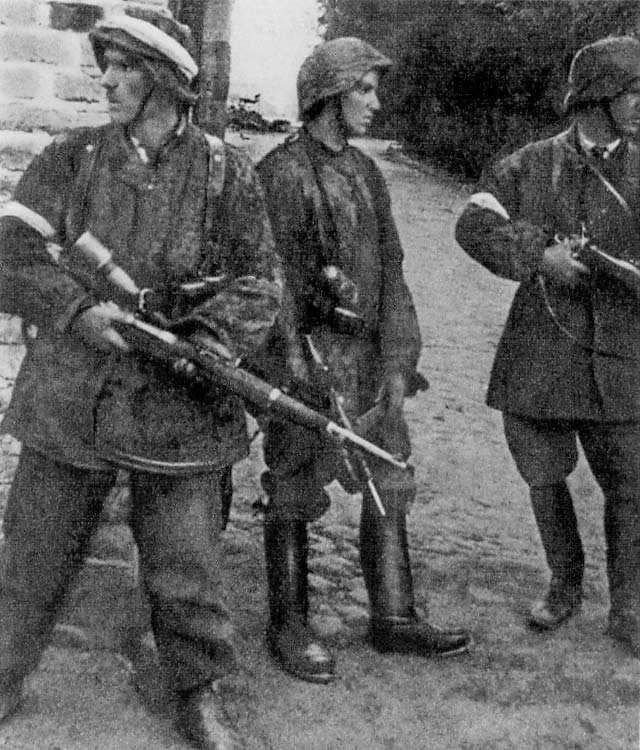
Soldiers of the Alek Platoon in the captured camp

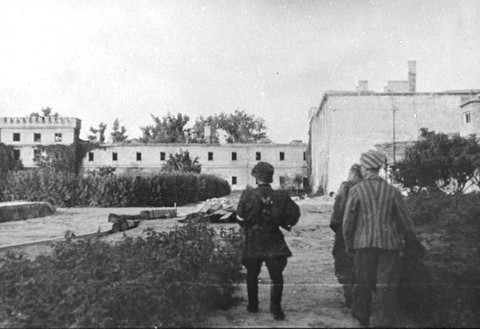
Juliusz Bogdan Deczkowski being shown around the camp by freed prisoners

For some time, officers of the Radosław Group had been considering a frontal assault on the camp on Gęsia Street. The commander of the Zośka Battalion, Lieutenant Ryszard Białous, codenamed Jerzy, recalled that on 1 August, the insurgents captured the "political commander of Gęsiówka", who testified that Jewish prisoners were still being held in the camp. It was clear that they could be murdered by the Germans at any moment. Wacław Micuta, codenamed Wacek, maintained that it was for this reason that several officers – the commander of the Broda 53 Brigade, Captain Jan Kajus Andrzejewski, codenamed Jan, Lieutenant Jerzy, and Wacek himself – went to the commander of the group with a request to issue an order to attack the camp. Colonel Jan Mazurkiewicz, codenamed Radosław, reportedly gave his reluctant consent, stipulating that the assault units must be small and composed only of volunteers.

Authors of studies on the Warsaw Uprising usually emphasized the military aspects of the attack on Gęsiówka, pointing out that capturing the camp allowed for the opening of a ground connection between Wola and the Old Town through the ruins of the ghetto. However, according to the memoirs of Jerzy, the insurgents' goals were to free the prisoners and to create a connection with the Old Town. According to Wacek, on the other hand, the decision to attack was motivated only by humanitarian considerations. (Note: On 5 August 1994, during the ceremony unveiling a plaque commemorating the liberation of the camp, he recalled:: "We all wanted to attack immediately: none of us thought in strategic terms about the further benefits that this attack could bring" (Kopka (2007, pp. 101–102)).) Some Polish historians and journalists, including Tomasz Szarota and Edward Kossoy, also lean towards this interpretation. According to Barbara Engelking and Dariusz Libionka, "the question of the motives behind the attack on Gęsiówka has not been definitively resolved".

The briefing before the battle took place on the morning of 5 August. Captain Jan announced that the assault would be commanded by Lieutenant Jerzy. Before the fighting began, Jerzy, together with Jan and Eugeniusz Stasiecki, codenamed Piotr Pomian, reconnoitred the area where the battle would take place.

The task facing the Zośka Battalion was very difficult. The camp garrison consisted of around 90 SS men. They were well-armed and had solid defensive support in the form of bunkers and watchtowers. The latter also provided them with a wide field of fire. Since an infantry attack had no chance of success under these circumstances, Jerzy believed that the key to victory was to use captured armored weapons. The detailed plan of attack he developed was as follows:

- The Pudel/Magda tank was to be at the forefront, followed by part of the Giewont Company. The attack was to proceed along Gęsia Street, with Jerzy in command of this section, accompanied by Piotr Pomian;
- The Felek Platoon, commanded by Officer Cadet Konrad Okolski, codenamed Kuba, was to advance along Gliniana Street, forming the left flank of the Polish assault;
- The second part of the Giewont Company was to form the forward right flank of the attack, led by the company commander, Lieutenant Władysław Cieplak, codenamed Giewont;
- The Alek Platoon was to take up positions on Okopowa Street and engage the German watchtowers with fire.

The Polish assault began at 10:00 AM, or according to other sources, before 11:00 AM. (Note: The Combat Diary of Radosław Group incorrectly states that the attack began at 4:50 PM, an error repeated by some historians (Borkiewicz-Celińska (1990, p. 573)).) A table set with a tureen of soup and bottles of alcohol was later found in the camp commandant's office, indicating that the Poles had surprised the garrison during their meal. Initially, the Germans mistook the insurgents' tank for one of their own and, according to the freed prisoners, reacted to its appearance with enthusiasm. It was only when Pudel broke through the barricade on Gęsia Street that they realized what was happening and opened rapid but ineffective fire with machine-guns. In response, the insurgent tank began methodically destroying German bunkers and watchtowers with shots from its 7.5 cm cannon. It then smashed through the iron gate, and the soldiers of the Zośka Battalion stormed into the camp behind it. After losing their fortifications, the Germans attempted to organize a defence around the commandant's building (known as the "white cottage"), but it was captured in a direct assault. The SS men began escaping in small groups into the ruins of the ghetto, coming under fire from a squad from the Maciek Company, which was stationed in the school on Stawki Street. Most of the Germans managed to escape under the cover of the Pawiak prison walls.

Polish casualties turned out to be relatively small. Juliusz Reyzz-Rubini, codenamed Piotr, was killed in action, while Zofia Krassowska, codenamed Zosia Duża, was seriously wounded and died the following day at the Wola Hospital. Jerzy Zastawny, codenamed Pręgus, was also wounded.

The Combat Diary of Radosław Group states that eight SS men were killed during the attack. A large amount of weapons and ammunition fell into the hands of the Home Army soldiers. A field kitchen was set up in the captured camp. The capture of Warsaw concentration camp ended the period of Polish initiative in the Warsaw Uprising. It enabled Radosław Group to establish a direct connection with the Old Town through the ruins of the ghetto and, according to Jerzy Kirchmayer, "was of great importance for the overall situation of the insurgents in Wola".

According to reports from the insurgents, 348 Jews, including 24 women, were liberated from the captured camp. Only 89 prisoners were Polish citizens, while the rest came from various European countries, including Hungary, Greece, France, the Netherlands, Czechoslovakia, and Lithuania. Captain Jerzy described the moment of the prisoners' liberation in the following words:

Now the barracks doors burst open under the pressure and the place swarmed with figures in striped uniforms. They ran with incredible shouts and waving arms, separating us, as if with a living wall, from the fleeing Germans [...] For a moment, I felt my throat tighten with joy that we had made it in time, because we were afraid that the Germans would liquidate the prisoners before our arrival.

Anna Borkiewicz-Celińska, in her monograph on the Zośka Battalion, describes another scene:

The freed Jews behaved in a touching way. When Lieutenant Wacek, tired and battered from the tank's jolting, went for a solitary walk after the battle, he found two rows of prisoners on a large square. One of the prisoners called the unit to attention and reported to Lieutenant Wacek: "Lieutenant,Officer Cadet Henryk Lederman of" – here he named the infantry regiment – "reports that the Jewish battalion is ready for battle".

Most Polish accounts describe the mutual emotion and joy at the prisoners' rescue, a mood also reflected in the surviving photographs from the liberated camp. The testimonies of Jewish survivors – and at least one unpublished Polish account – present a more complex picture, in which scenes of joy are accompanied by references to antisemitic incidents that occurred during the liberation.

== Fate of the liberated Jews ==
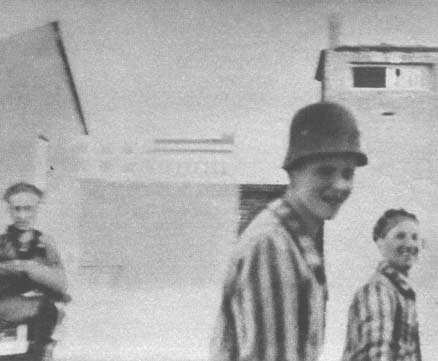
Liberated Jewish prisoners

The insurgent press reported on the capture of the camp and the liberation of Jewish prisoners. The Bureau of Information and Propaganda of the Home Army High Command intended to send a telegram to London on this matter. Ultimately, however, it was not sent – as Antoni Przygoński assumed, because its content was not accepted by General Tadeusz Komorowski, codenamed Bór.

The Home Army High Command initially viewed the appearance of a large number of foreign Jews in the uprising areas with some concern. On 4 August – the day before the liberation of Warsaw concentration camp – the Chief of Staff of the Home Army High Command, General Tadeusz Pełczyński, codenamed Grzegorz, ordered the commander of the Warsaw District, General Antoni Chruściel, codenamed Monter, to organize a camp for internees, where freed Jews and "other undesirable elements" would be sent. At the same time, he ordered that the insurgent units be given appropriate instructions "that would rule out any possible excesses against Jews". Ultimately, however, the plan to intern Jews was not carried out.

Former prisoners of Warsaw concentration camp unanimously expressed their willingness to join the uprising. This was motivated both by a desire for revenge against the Germans and, as Teresa Prekerowa emphasized, by the fact that they had nowhere else to go. For foreign Jews, deprived of their livelihoods, unfamiliar with the language and local realities, joining the uprising meant, in practice, an increased chance of survival in the besieged city. Due to the severe shortage of weapons afflicting the insurgents, most of the freed prisoners were assigned to auxiliary formations. It was probably the lack of sufficient weapons and ammunition that led to the abandonment of the idea of organizing a separate Jewish subunit within the Zośka Battalion.

Ultimately, around 50 former prisoners of Warsaw concentration camp joined the ranks of the Zośka Battalion. Some of this group, including Henryk Lederman, codenamed Heniek, were assigned to the armored platoon, where their technical skills proved very useful. Lederman and Dawid Goldman, codenamed Gutek – like Henryk Poznański, codenamed Bystry, who was assigned to the Parasol Battalion – also served as sewer guides on multiple occasions. A dozen or so Jews were assigned to the quartermaster section of the Broda 53 Brigade, and another 44 to the quartermaster section of the Wigry Battalion. The 150 former prisoners also formed the International Jewish Auxiliary Brigade of the People's Army, which was mainly involved in building barricades. Around 20 or so prisoners formed a rescue brigade, whose task was to extinguish fires and rescue people buried in the ruins. Other Jews joined various insurgent units in small groups. It is possible that some of them even joined the Old Town units of the National Armed Forces.

The prisoners of Warsaw concentration camp who served in the insurgent ranks were remembered by their Polish comrades-in-arms as combatants who fought with dedication and even contempt for death. Almost all of them died during the uprising. (Note: In the memoirs of some Jewish participants of the Warsaw Uprising, there is the opinion that casualties among the liberated prisoners were exceptionally high because the Home Army command deliberately assigned them particularly dangerous tasks (Paulsson (2009, pp. 269–270)).) Those who fell back into German hands were murdered. Foreign Jews, whose lack of knowledge of the Polish language and lack of documents betrayed them, had little chance of survival. Around 50 foreign Jews were killed during the Wola massacre; they were shot on 6 August on the grounds of an agricultural machinery warehouse of the Kirchmajer and Marczewski factory at 79/81 Wolska Street. Several dozen more were shot on 2 September at Krasiński Square, following the fall of the Old Town. Paul Förro, codenamed Paweł, and Sołtan Safijew, codenamed Dr Turek, were murdered by the Germans in Powiśle Czerniakowskie on 22 September.

Among the prisoners released from Warsaw concentration camp, the following survived the war: Chaim Goldstein, Zofia Samsztejn, Bronisław Anlen, Dawid Fogelman, Leon Kopelman, Ryszard Sutka, Abram Zylberstein, Stanisław Siemiński, Jacques Otidett (from Greece), N.N. Carl (from France), and Ernö Hermanovics (from Hungary).

== Commemoration ==
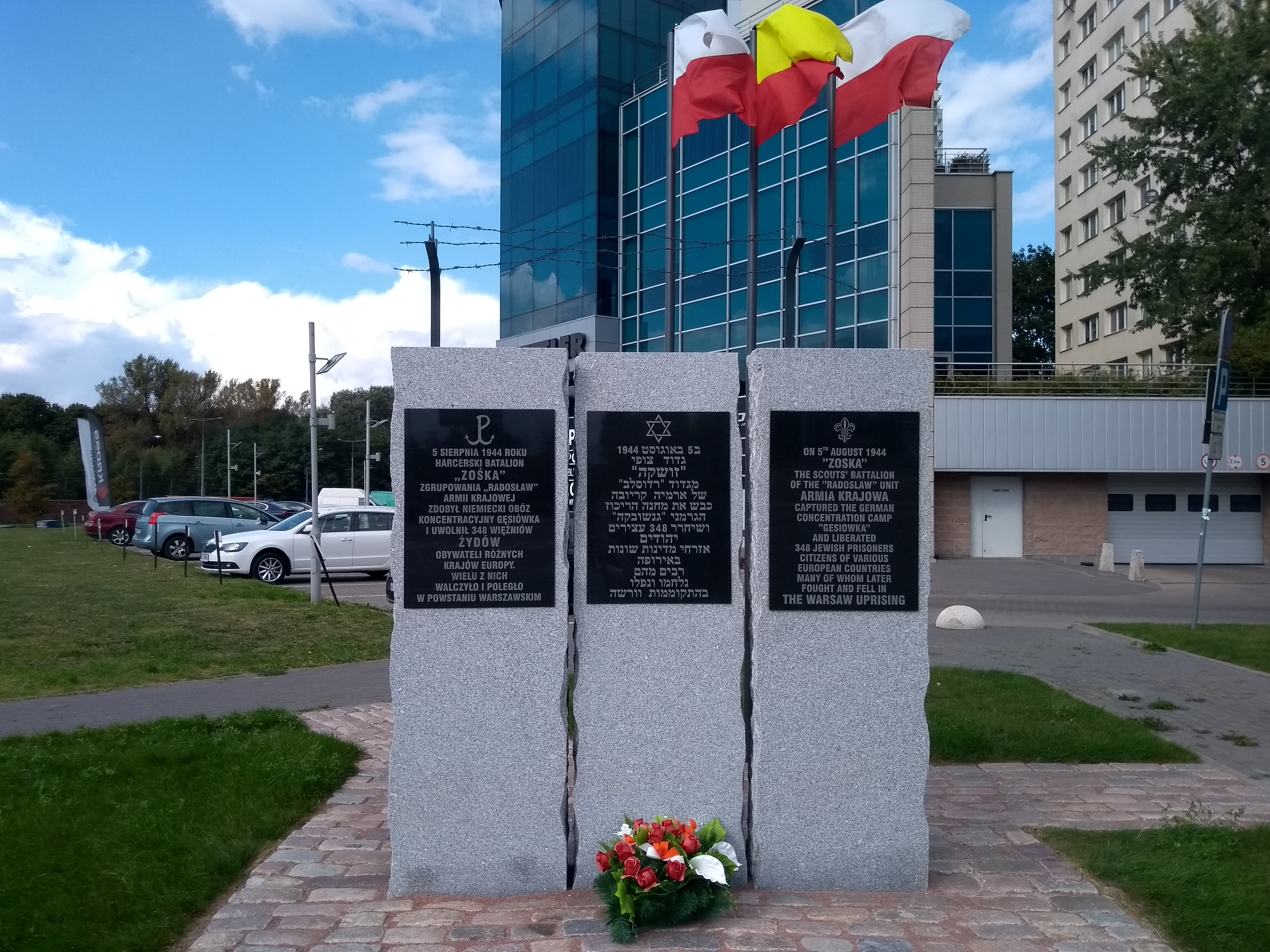
Plaques at the corner of Mordechai Anielewicz Street and Okopowa Street, commemorating the liberation of the camp

In 1994, plaques commemorating the liberation of Warsaw concentration camp were unveiled on the wall of the building at 34 Mordechai Anielewicz Street. They bear an inscription in Polish, Hebrew, and English:

On 5 August 1944, the Zośka Battalion of the Radosław Group of the Home Army captured the German Gęsiówka concentration camp and liberated 348 Jewish prisoners – citizens of various European countries. Many of them fought and died in the Warsaw Uprising.

In 2018, in order to "improve the conditions of the exhibition and the legibility of the historical message", the plaques were moved to the corner of Mordechai Anielewicz Street and Okopowa Street, where they were installed on three stone cuboids.

On 8 May 2003, during a special ceremony held at the University of Warsaw, the Zośka Battalion was honored by the Yad Vashem institute. The ceremony was attended by surviving participants of the attack on Gęsiówka.

== Bibliography ==
- Borkiewicz, Adam (2018). Powstanie warszawskie. Zarys działań natury wojskowej [The Warsaw Uprising: An Outline of Military Operations] (in Polish). Warsaw: Warsaw Rising Museum. ISBN 978-83-64308-20-8.
- Borkiewicz-Celińska, Anna (1990). Batalion „Zośka" [Zośka Battalion] (in Polish). Warsaw: State Publishing Institute PIW. ISBN 83-06-01851-6.
- Engelking, Barbara; Leociak, Jacek (2013). Getto warszawskie. Przewodnik po nieistniejącym mieście [The Warsaw Ghetto: A Guide to the Vanished City] (in Polish). Warsaw: Association Center for Research on the Extermination of Jews. ISBN 978-83-63444-27-3.
- Engelking, Barbara; Libionka, Dariusz (2009). Żydzi w powstańczej Warszawie [Jews in Insurgent Warsaw] (in Polish). Warsaw: Association Center for Research on the Extermination of Jews. ISBN 978-83-926831-1-7.
- Kirchmayer, Jerzy (1984). Powstanie Warszawskie [The Warsaw Uprising] (in Polish). Warsaw: Książka i Wiedza. ISBN 83-05-11-080-X.
- Kopka, Bogusław (2007). Konzentrationslager Warschau. Historia i następstwa [Konzentrationslager Warschau: History and Aftermath] (in Polish). Warsaw: Institute of National Remembrance. ISBN 978-83-60464-46-5.
- Motyl, Maja; Rutkowski, Stanisław (1994). Powstanie Warszawskie – rejestr miejsc i faktów zbrodni [The Warsaw Uprising: A Register of Places and Facts of Crimes] (in Polish). Warsaw: GKBZpNP-IPN. ISBN 978-83-7399-613-7.
- Nowożycki, Bartosz (2014). Zgrupowanie AK „Radosław" [Home Army Combat Group "Radosław"] (in Polish). Warsaw: Rytm. ISBN 978-83-7399-613-7.
- Paulsson, Gunnar S. (2009). Utajone miasto. Żydzi po aryjskiej stronie Warszawy (1940–1945) [Secret City: The Hidden Jews of Warsaw, 1940–1945] (in Polish). Kraków: Znak. ISBN 978-83-240-1252-7.
- Przygoński, Antoni (1980). Powstanie warszawskie w sierpniu 1944 r [The Warsaw Uprising in August 1944] (in Polish). Vol. I. Warsaw: PWN. ISBN 83-01-00293-X.
- Sumiński, Tadeusz, ed. (1981). Pamiętniki żołnierzy baonu „Zośka". Powstanie Warszawskie [Memoirs of Soldiers of The Zośka Battalion: The Warsaw Uprising] (in Polish). Warsaw: Nasza Księgarnia. ISBN 83-10-07687-8.
