= Edward Kossoy =

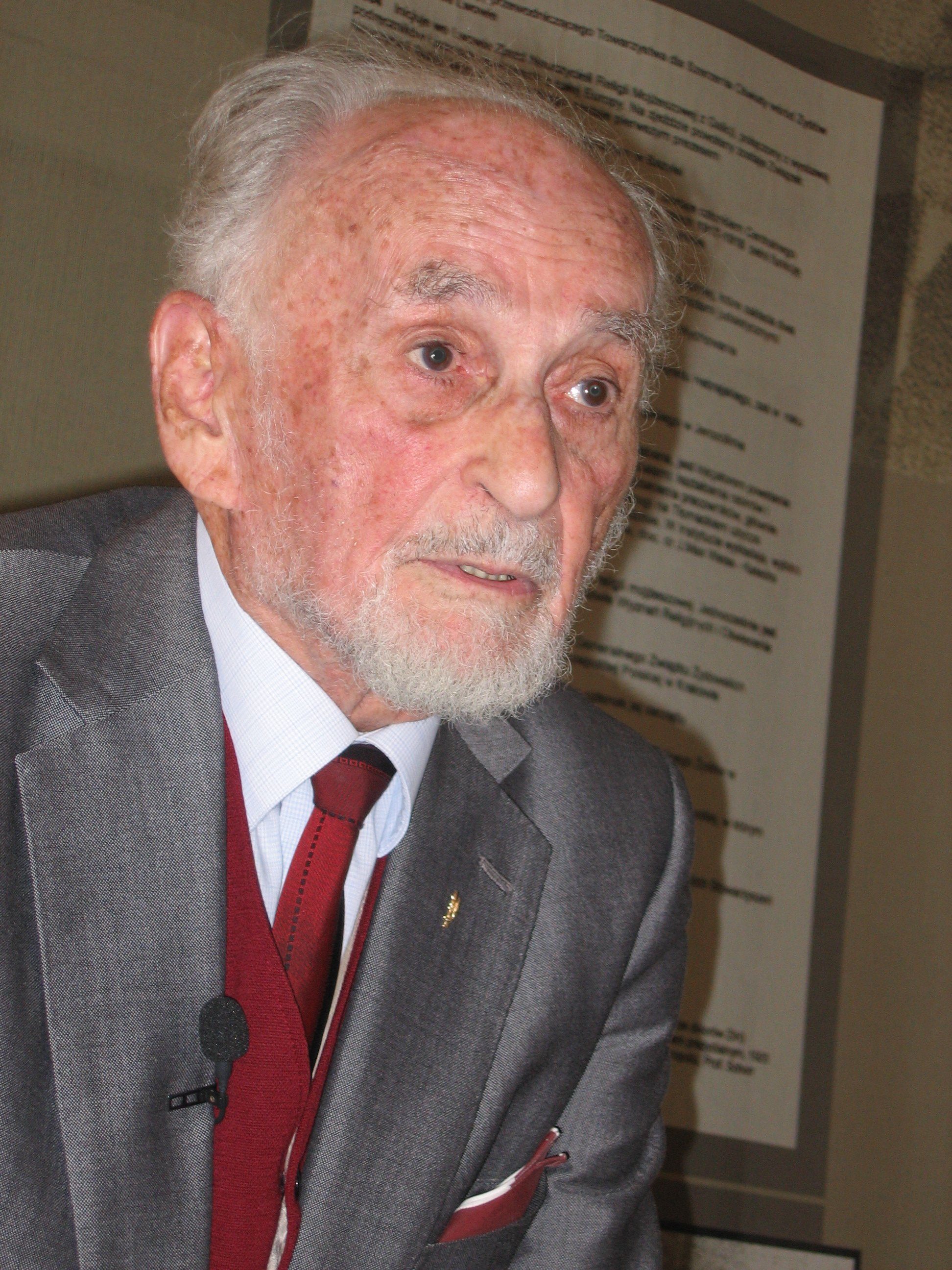
- Edward Kossoy in Warsaw in May 2007
- Born: 4 June 1913; Radom, Poland
- Died: 11 October 2012 (aged 99); Switzerland
- Other name: Marcinak
- Occupations: Holocaust survivor, Irgun guerrilla; lawyer, attorney, activist, essayist, memoirist

Edward Kossoy (used the nom de guerre Marcinak; 4 June 1913 – 11 October 2012) was a Polish lawyer, publicist and an activist for victims of Nazism.

== Early life ==
Kossoy was born in Radom but spent his childhood in Yekaterinoslav, Russian Empire, where his parents relocated during World War I.

== World War II ==
After the Polish-Soviet War and the Peace of Riga in 1921 he moved back to Poland. In 1930 he finished the Tytus Chałubiński National Gymnasium in Radom and then studied at the Law School of Warsaw University. He graduated in 1934. In 1939, in the wake of the Nazi invasion of Poland, Kossoy fled Warsaw and escaped eastward to Lviv which was taken over by the Soviet Union after the Soviet invasion of Poland. He was hoping to locate his family there and he himself planned on making his way through Romania to France to join the Polish army that was being recreated there. In 1940, he was arrested by the Soviet militia, charged with smuggling watches he was trying to sell to raise money for his family and for travel to France. During interrogation he admitted to having had a higher education and was handed over to the NKVD which charged him with espionage and "counter-revolutionary activity".

He was sentenced, according to the famous Article 58, to eight years in the Gulag and sent to one of the sub-camps of Vorkuta, Pechora. There he worked on the construction of the railway which connected the mouth of the Pechora River with the southern end of the Urals, according to the Russian inmates, the railway had two dead bodies under every rail. According to Kossoy, who contracted typhus in the camp, out of the 20,000 Poles who arrived at the camp in 1941, only 6,000 were alive two years later.

He was released after two years because of the Sikorski–Mayski Agreement. He evacuated the Soviet Union with the Anders Army. During World War II, his father, wife and daughter were murdered by the Germans as part of Operation Harvest Festival. He was officially discharged from the Anders Army in 1943 in Teheran due to illness; in addition to typhus he had also contracted malaria. By late 1943 he had made his way to the British Mandate of Palestine, where he would remain. In Tel Aviv in 1944, he wrote and published a series of essays, Stołypinka (named after the rail cars used to transport prisoners to the gulag), based on his experiences, but these essays weren't published in book form until 2003.

== 1947–1949 war ==
Kossoy was a member of Menachem Begin's underground Irgun guerrilla organisation, and in 1948 he participated in the 1947–1949 Palestine war in its ranks. After end of World War II Kossoy remarried. His wife had been born in Warsaw and taken part in that city's uprising. He lived in Israel until 1954, when he returned to Europe. He studied in Munich, Cologne and at the Graduate Institute of International Studies in Geneva, earning his Ph.D. in law and political science.

== Geneva ==
In Geneva he met Wacław Micuta, a former member of the Polish Home Army and a United Nations staff member, and the two quickly became friends. It was Micuta who first told Kossoy about the liberation of the Gęsiówka concentration camp by Polish resistance during the Warsaw Uprising. At first Kossoy was sceptical but he decided to investigate the matter farther and located some survivors of the camp among his clients, who confirmed Micuta's story. Kossoy wrote several historical articles on the subject, which were published by Yad Vashem and in the Polish emigre press (with the help from Jerzy Giedroyc).

== Work as an attorney ==
As an attorney, he represented around 60,000 victims of the Holocaust, involving restitution and reparations from the German government. His clients included Jews, Poles and Romani.

== Publications ==
He has published several books in various languages (English, German and Polish) and historical articles related to restitution for Nazi crimes, contemporary international relations and Polish-Jewish dialogue. Many were published in Zeszyty Historyczne (Historical Journals), published by the Literary Institute of Paris. His memoirs, entitled On the Margin..., were published in 2006, and nominated for the Nike Award in 2007. At the time of his death he was an honorary senator of the University of Tübingen. Until his death, he lived in Conches, Geneva, Switzerland.
