= Więckowski =

Wieckowski or Więckowski (feminine: Więckowska; plural: Więckowscy) is a Polish surname. Notable people with the surname include:

- Andrzej Więckowski (1945–2019), Polish-American scientist
- Bob Wieckowski (born 1955), American attorney and politician
- Ewa Więckowska (born 1958), Polish politician
- Irena Więckowska (born 1982), Polish sabre fencer
- Jan Więckowski (1923–2008), Polish military officer
- Marian Więckowski (1933–2020), Polish racing cyclist
- Mirosław Więckowski (born 1952), Polish luger

== See also ==
- Josh Winckowski (born 1998), American baseball player
