= Jan Więckowski =

- Born: Jan Józef Więckowski; July 25, 1923; Warsaw, Poland
- Died: July 11, 2008 (aged 84); Bryn Mawr, Pennsylvania, United States
- Burial place: Our Lady of Czestochowa Cemetery
- Spouse(s): First: Irena née Milko (1946); Second: Joanna née Gronkiewicz (1965)
- Relatives: Helena Więckowska, Maria "Marysia" Więckowska
- Military career
- Allegiance: Poland
- Branch: Home Army
- Service years: 1940–1948
- Rank: Captain
- Nickname: Drogosław
- Unit: Battalion Zośka
- Commands: II Company Rudy in Battalion Zośka
- Conflicts: World War II, Warsaw Uprising
- Awards: Cross of Valour (Twice), Cross of Merit, Order of Merit of the Republic of Poland

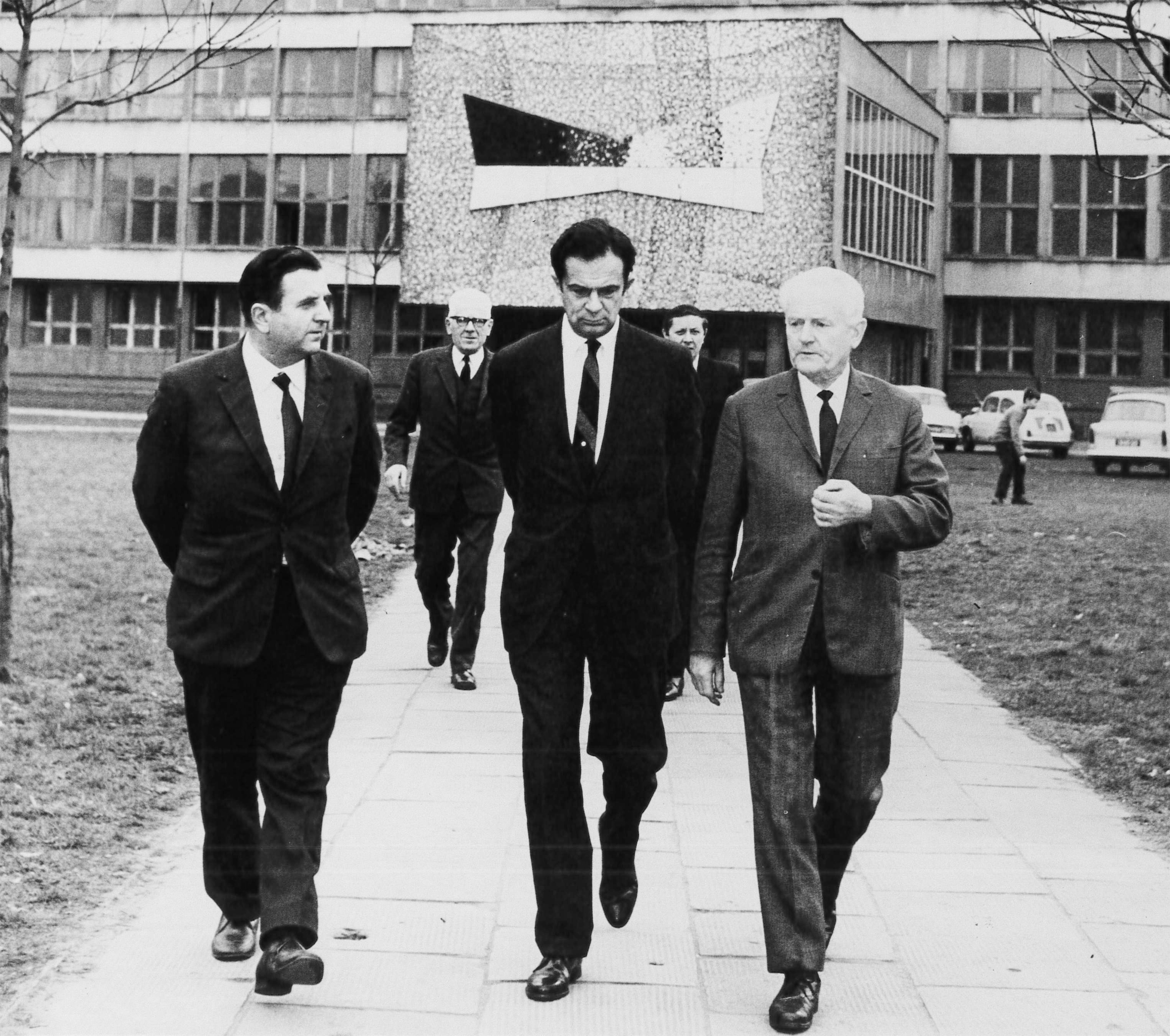
J.J. Więckowski (Vice-President of the Girard Trust Bank in Philadelphia, US), walking in the foreground alongside Col. Zdzisław Ciesiołkiewicz to his right, Chancellor Mieczysław Łubański to his left, and Col. Janusz Podgórski to his right in the background. Warsaw University of Technology, April 1971, after talks with Chancellor Łubiński.

Jan Józef Więckowski nom de guerre Drogosław (July 25, 1923, in Warsaw, Poland – July 11, 2008, in Bryn Mawr, Pennsylvania, US) was a Sub-Scout Master in the Polish Scouting Movement, a 2nd Lieutenant of the Home Army and a Captain of the Polish Armed Forces, Polish resistance member during the Warsaw Uprising, both Chief and Chief of Security for the Second Company Rudy of Battalion Zośka, and a 1951 graduate of international economics from Stetson University.

== Youth ==
Jan Więckowski, born Jan Józef Więckowski, was the son of Aleksander Więckowski – a veteran of the Polish-Soviet War and an architect engineer who worked in the Infrastructure Department of the Ministry of Military Affairs in Interwar Poland, and Dr. Helena Więckowska née Braunstein – a veteran of the Siege of Lwów, doctor of philosophy from the University of Warsaw, historian and director of the university library in Łódź. Jan was the brother of Maria Więckowska, a courier for the First Platoon "Sad" of the Battalion "Zośka" murdered during the Warsaw Uprising. Jan was a student of the Male Gymnasium & Lyceum of the Masovian Lands Society. One of his classmates was Andrzej Romocki. From 1935, Jan was a scout in the 21st Varsovian Scout Team Ignacy Prądzyński.

== Resistance ==
=== 1940–1944 ===
Jan Więckowski joined PET in 1940. PET was a small organization created by Polish students which allowed young Poles to continue their education in the Polish Underground. Through PET, Jan completed his schooling and passed his Matura examination in 1941. Once PET merged with the Gray Ranks, Więckowski was assigned to the southern scouting team SAD-400, commanded by his former classmate Andrzej Romocki. The unit specialized in minor sabotage and was referred to by the codename Wawer. Więckowski took part in Operacja Lornetka (Operation Binoculars) - an intelligence-gathering operation that allowed for the planning of another operation which concluded with the bombing of a German Wehrmacht troop transport train near Gołąb on June 30, 1943. In late August 1943, Battalion Zośka was established, and Więckowski was appointed Chief of the 2nd Company, nicknamed "Company Rudy". On June 1, 1944, he was appointed Chief of Security for all of Battalion Zośka. He was responsible for the preparation of all platoons in the battalion during sabotage and diversion operations, which included the notable Operation Kutschera - the successful assassination of SS and Reich Police Chief of Warsaw Franz Kutschera. In 1944, Więckowski graduated from the second round of training at the underground Infantry Cadets Reserve School Agricola. Wieckowski's mother - Helena Więckowska, was a member of the secret Government Delegation for Poland subordinated to the Polish Government in Exile and helped teach in the underground's school system.

=== Warsaw Uprising ===
During the first month of the Warsaw Uprising, Więckowski fought alongside Battalion Zośka in Wola and the Old Town. On the 19th day of the Uprising, Więckowski was wounded by an exploding grenade, resulting in hearing-loss in his left ear; he remained deaf in the left ear throughout the rest of his life. On August 31, along with his Company Rudy and Group A of the Kedyw Leadership, Więckowski successfully broke through German lines in the Saxon Garden to the Polish-held City Center as part of a larger, although unsuccessful, Polish operation to breakthrough to the City Center. Więckowski contributed greatly to this heroic breakthrough of his group thanks to his fluent knowledge of the German language.

Upon breaking through, Więckowski made his way to the southern district of Czerniaków where he made contact with the Kedyw Unit Broda 53. Afterwards, he returned to the City Center where he helped evacuate the less severely wounded soldiers to Czerniaków. Sometime within the first two weeks of September, Więckowski was cut off from his Battalion Rudy, and from September 13, he fought as an adjunct to the commander of Battalion Wigry - a youth scouting unit which had taken up arms and joined the Uprising. Więckowski participated in battles which helped hold back German forces, allowing Polish civilians and resistance fighters to evacuate and retreat from Warsaw.

At the capitulation of the Warsaw Uprising, Więckowski found himself a POW in German captivity. He was held captive in Oflag II D Gross Born (Grossborn-Westfalenhof), Stalag X-B near Sandbostel, Fallingbostel, and in the Bergen-Belsen concentration camp before being liberated by British forces from the Oflag X-C camp near Lübeck on May 2, 1945.

Jan Więckowski's 19-year-old sister - Maria Marysia Więckowska, first served as a nurse in the Second Team of the Oleńka Platoon before serving in the communications department of First Platoon Sad, which was one of several platoons in the II Company Rudy - the very company Jan was in charge of. Wounded some-time in late August, Maria was kept in a field hospital set up by the Polish Resistance in Building #23 on Miodowa Street, known as the "Miodowa 23 Hospital". On September 2, the hospital was liquidated by German and Ukrainian forces resulting in the murders of several injured Poles - including Maria Więckowska. During the liquidation of the "Miodowa 23 Hospital," several Greek Jews liberated previously by the Polish Resistance from Gęsiówka were also murdered by the Germans and Ukrainians.

== Post-WWII life ==
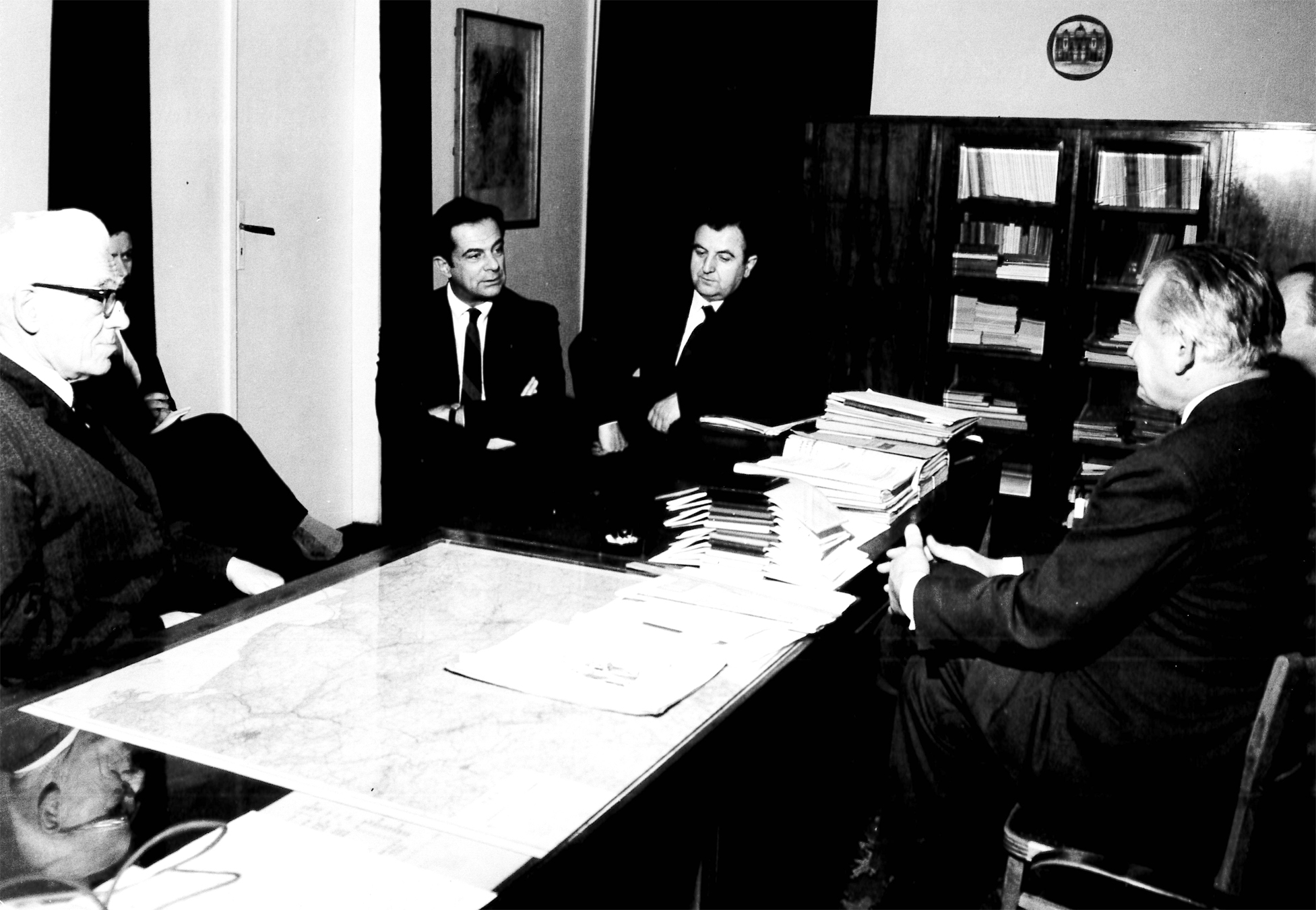
J.J. Więckowski (Vice-President of the Girard Trust Bank in Philadelphia, USA) sitting cross-armed by the door along with Col. Janusz Podgórski to his right, with Col. Zdzisław Ciesiołkiewicz to his left, Warsaw University of Technology Chancellor Mieczysław Łubiński across the table, and others, in April 1971.

Upon being liberated from Oflag X-C by the British, Więckowski left for Meppen in May 1945 and joined the Polish First Armoured Division. He was transported to France, and then Great Britain. There, he was incorporated into the Polish Armed Forces in Great Britain. He was transferred to the First Corpus of the Polish Armed Forces stationed in Edinburgh. In January 1946, he moved to London where he served on the staff of the Home Army Historical Commission of the Polish Commander-in-Chief, led by General Tadeusz Pełczyński and Colonel Kazimierz Iranek-Osmecki. As the personal adjunct adjutant to the Commander-in-Chief General Tadeusz Bór-Komorowski, Więckowski traveled alongside the General and visited the various Polish units stationed throughout Great Britain. Additionally, Więckowski served as the First Secretary of the Circle of Home Army Veterans in London.

Upon the demobilization of the Polish Armed Forces in Great Britain, Więckowski emigrated to the United States. From 1948 to 1951, Więckowski studied international economics at the Stetson University in DeLand, graduating in 1951 with a master's degree in international economics. From 1951, he worked for Girard Bank in Philadelphia, and in 1976, he was promoted to Vice-President of the bank. In 1986, he retired yet continued to work as an adviser for several financial firms. He acted as the Director of the Consultation Council of Bank Pekao in New York City. From 1990 to 1996, Więckowski served as an adviser to Bank Pekao's President in Warsaw.

Więckowski was an active member of the Zośkowcy Community - a veterans of Battalion Zośka. He donated his personal journals and documents to the Archive of the Gray Ranks. He was also a Council Member of the Józef Piłsudski Institute of America. On July 11, 2008, Jan Więckowski died in Bryn Mawr, Pennsylvania. He was laid to rest at the Our Lady of Czestochowa Cemetery in Doylestown, Pennsylvania.

== Promotions ==
- Second Lieutenant - 1944
- Lieutenant - 1990
- Captain - 2002

== Bibliography ==
- Borkiewicz-Celińska, Anna (1990). Batalion "Zośka" (in Polish). Warsaw: Państwowy Instytut Wydawniczy. ISBN 83-0601-851-6.
- Trojan, Włodzimierz (2002). Ci, którzy przeżyli... Biografie żołnierzy batalionu "Zośka" (in Polish). Warsaw: Środowisko Batalionu "Zośka" Armii Krajowej. pp. 390–393. ISBN 83-9168-760-0.
- Wachowicz, Barbara (2005). Wierna rzeka harcerstwa. Tom IV. To Zośki wiara! Gawęda o Harcerskim Batalionie AK "Zośka". Cz. 1 (in Polish). Warsaw: Oficyna Wydawnicza RYTM. ISBN 83-7399-079-8.
