= Henryk Lederman =

Polish resistance fighter

Henryk Lederman, (nom-de-guerre "Heniek") (born ?; died 5 September 1944 in Warsaw) was a cadet officer of the Polish Army who participated in the Warsaw Ghetto Uprising and the Warsaw Uprising. His branch in the Polish Army was the Radosław Group in the Broda 53 regiment.

After the end of the Warsaw Ghetto Uprising Lederman was placed in the Gęsiówka concentration camp. On the fifth day of the Warsaw Uprising Gęsiówka was liberated by a unit led by Wacław Micuta. Henryk Lederman gathered a group of the freed prisoners and presented them to Micuta as a Jewish Battalion ready to fight. He served as a mechanic in the armored platoon headed by Micuta. Shortly thereafter he fought in Old Town, in Wola, where, together with David Goldman he served as a guide through the sewers which he was familiar with since the Ghetto uprising.

He was wounded in later fighting and transported to the insurgent hospital on Drewniana street, in the Riverside district. On September 5 the hospital was taken by German troops and all its patients, including Lederman, were murdered.

He was posthumously awarded the Cross of Valor.
