= Anna Zakrzewska =

Polish resistance fighter (1925–1944)

Anna Zakrzewska "Hanka Biała" (White Hannah)
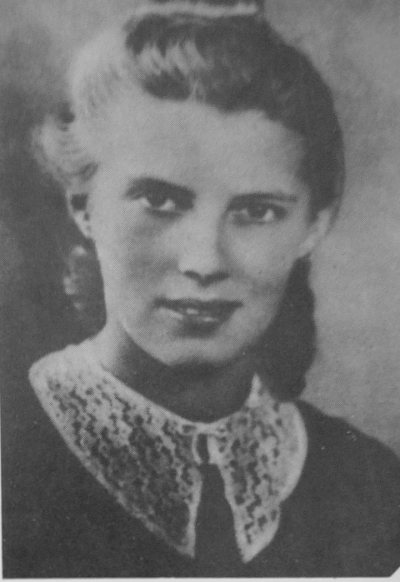
- Born: December 24, 1925
- Died: August 11, 1944 (aged 18); Warsaw, Poland
- Military career
- Allegiance: Poland
- Branch: Armia Krajowa (Home Army)
- Rank: Medical orderly
- Unit: Batalion Zośka
- Conflicts: Warsaw Uprising in World War II
- Awards: Krzyz Walecznych ("Cross of Valor")

Anna Zakrzewska (24 December 1925 – 11 August 1944) served with the Polish underground army as a courier and a medical orderly. She was killed in the course of desperate combat during the Warsaw Uprising.

== Service with the Home Army ==
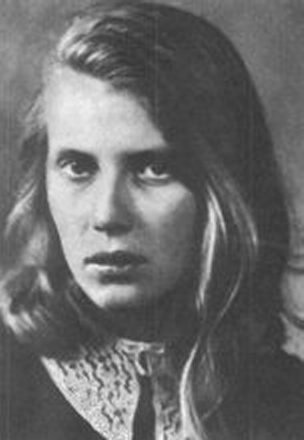
Anna Zakrzewska, known as "Hanka Biała" (White Hannah)

Zakrzewska's underground code name was Hanka Biała (White Hannah). She received training at the end of June and in July 1944 in the Wyszkowa forest. During the Warsaw Uprising, she was assigned to III Platoon ("Felek"), 2 Company ("Rudy") of Batalion Zośka. Batalion Zośka was established by leaders of the Polish Scouting movement (code name: Szare Szeregi), a centre of resistance to the Nazi occupation.

== Participation in the Warsaw uprising ==
The Warsaw Uprising began on 1 August 1944. On 11 August 1944, Zakrzewska was killed along with many other soldiers of Batalion Zośka, which was then engaged in combat with the German forces in the Wola district of Warsaw. Work as a courier was extremely hazardous; other women of Rudy company who were killed during the uprising included Stefania Grzeszczak, Dorota Łempicka, Zofia Kasperska, and Zofia Krassowska.

On 8 August 1944 Batalion Zośka had seized a school building and taken the defending Germans prisoner. The Germans counterattacked, and the battalion held the school for three days. The nurses of the battalion kept a lookout for the enemy, distributed orders, ammunition, and meals, and cared for the wounded. The battalion was forced to evacuate the building, and Zakrzewska left with the others. During the evacuation, they were forced to cross some open ground. It was at this point that Zakrzewska was struck by bullets, probably from a machine gun, and killed. A soldier of the Armia Krajowa who was with her when she died, reported the circumstance of Zakrzewska's death to her parents, Irena and Jan.

== Military honors ==
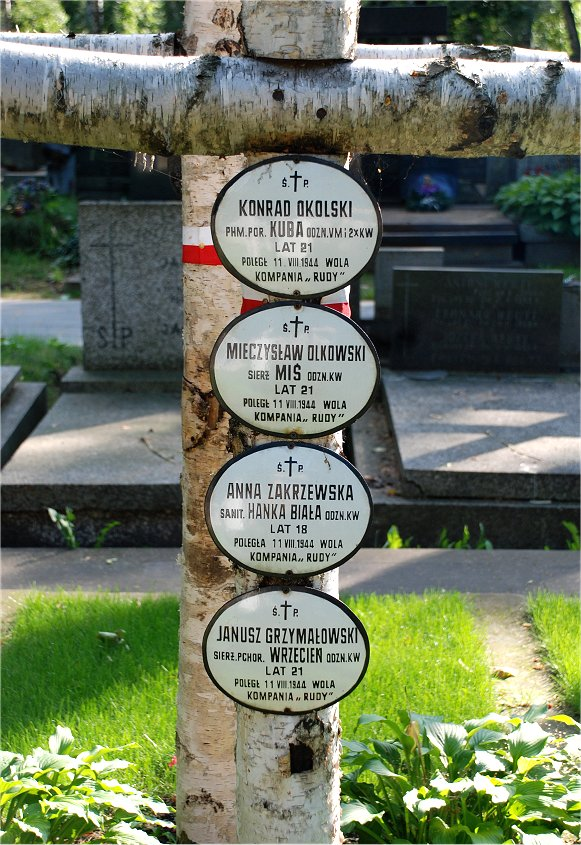
Monument to Anna Zakrzewska and three other members of Batalion Zośka.

Stanisław Sieradzki (code name "Świst"; 1921–2009), the soldier with Zakrzewska at the time of her death, described her as "heroic." Zakrzewska was posthumously awarded the Krzyż Walecznych ("Cross of Valor").

== Sources ==
- (in Polish) Warsaw Uprising 1944: list of members of Batalion Zoska
- (in Polish) Stanisław Sieradzki: Kartki z Powstania Warszawskiego. Hanka Biała sanitariuszka plutonu "Felek"
- (in Polish) Anna Zakrzewska na Wirtualnym Murze Pamięci Muzeum Powstania Warszawskiego
