= Zośka Battalion =

Battalion Zośka
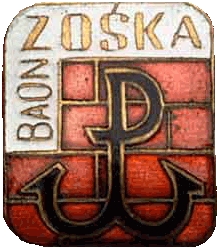
- Active: 1943—1944
- Allegiance: Polish Underground
- Branch: Armia Krajowa (Home Army)
- Type: Paramilitary
- Role: Close combat HUMINT; Irregular warfare Raiding; Reconnaissance; Tracking; Urban warfare
- Size: Battalion
- Engagements: Warsaw Uprising

Battalion Zośka (pronounced /'zɔɕ.ka/; 'Sophie' in Polish) was a paramilitary scouts battalion that specialized in field intelligence gathering, irregular warfare and scouting of the Polish resistance movement organisation - Home Army (Armia Krajowa or "AK") during World War II. It mainly consisted of members of the Szare Szeregi paramilitary Boy Scouts. It was formed in late August 1943. A part of the Radosław Group, the battalion played a major role in the Warsaw Uprising of 1944.

Zośka was named after Tadeusz Zawadzki, who used the name as his pseudonym during the AK's early days. He was killed during a partisan action.

== History ==
The battalion was formed in late August 1943 as part of the Radosław Group, fighting in Wola and the Starówka, from where they allowed the "Rudy" company to do a breakthrough to the centre of the city through the Saxon Garden which eventually failed. After capturing two Panther tanks in 2 August, an armoured platoon was formed under the command of Wacław Micuta. The battalion gained the War Order of Virtuti Militari.

== Liberation of the concentration camp "Gęsiówka" ==
Zośka fighters liberated prisoners of the concentration camp Gęsiówka in August 1944. The 383 able-bodied prisoners (including 348 Jews), both men and women who were left in Gęsiówka to assist with the destruction of the evidence of mass murder, were rescued from certain death. Most of these survivors joined the Zośka unit and fought in the Warsaw uprising.

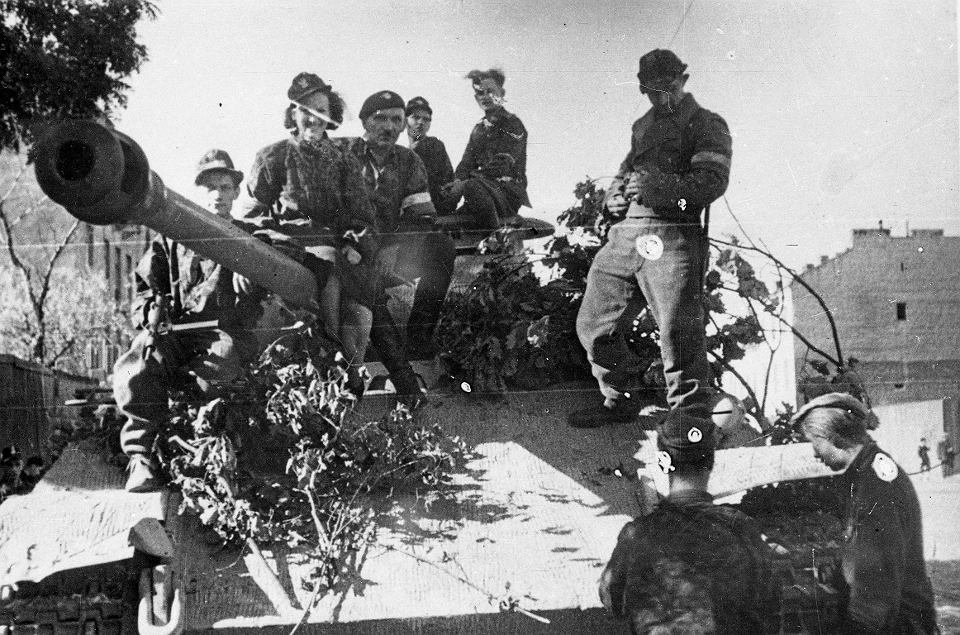
Captured German Panther tank – armored platoon of Battalion Zośka under command of Wacław Micuta

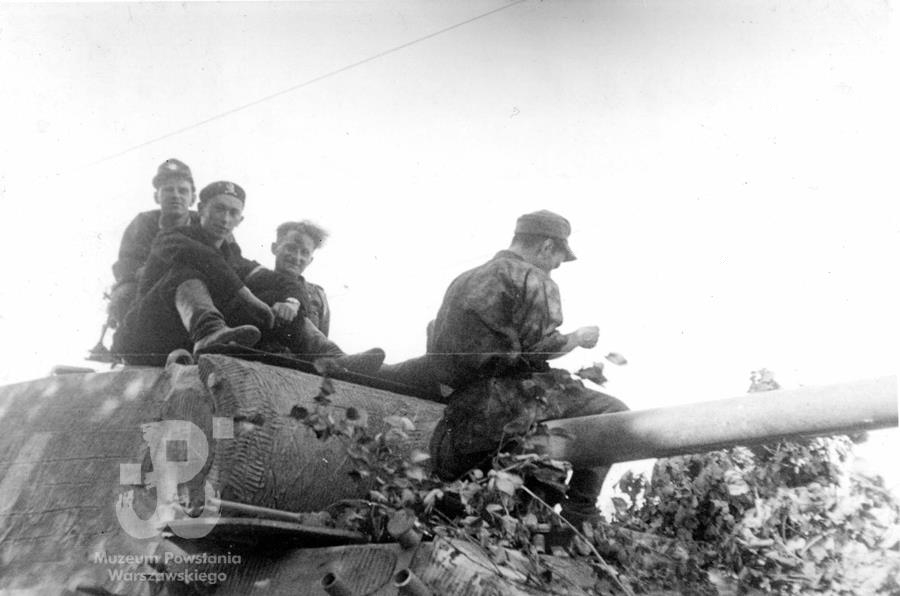
Captured tank

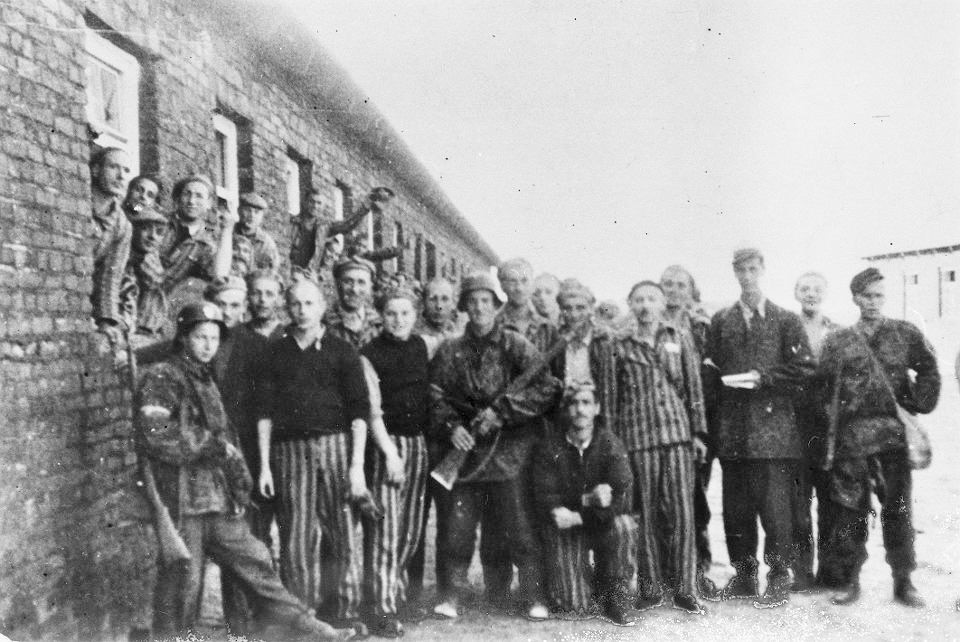
Prisoners of Gęsiówka and the Zośka fighters after the liberation of the camp in August 1944

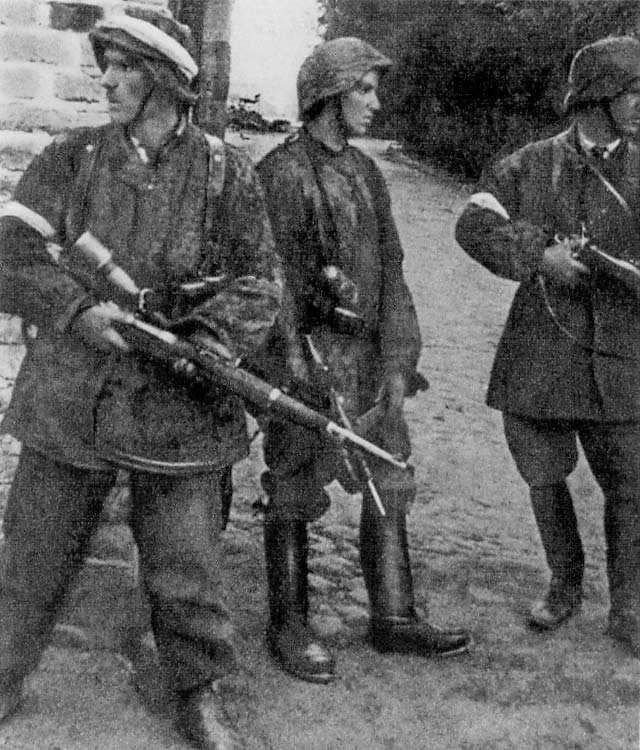
Warsaw Uprising 5 August 1944 in Gęsiówka. The men are dressed in captured German uniforms and armed with confiscated German weapons. From left: Wojciech Omyła "Wojtek", Juliusz Bogdan Deczkowski "Laudański" and Tadeusz Milewski "Ćwik". Milewski was killed on the same day. Omyla was killed several days later on 8 August 1944.

Other famous Home Army battalions were: Miotła, Czata, Pięść, and Batalion Parasol. Between 1944 and 1956, all surviving former members of Batalion Zośka were incarcerated in the Soviet NKVD prisons.

== Commanding officers during the Warsaw Uprising ==
Order of battle
| Commander | Second Commander | HQ Officers |
Leadership during the Warsaw Uprising
| por. kpt. "Jerzy" Ryszard Białous | kpt. hm. "Piotr Pomian" Eugeniusz Stasiecki † | por. "Szczerba" Jerzy Berowski † por. "Jurek TK" Jerzy Pepłowski † por. "Xen" Bolesław Stańczyk por. "Brzechwa" Roman Grzybowski ks. "Ojciec Paweł" Józef Warszawski |
1st Company "Maciek"
| por. phm. "Blondyn" Andrzej Łukoski † | | ppor. "Kmita" Henryk Kozłowski † ppor. "Skalski" Tadeusz Schiffers † |
1st Platoon "Włodek"
| por. "Tyka" Jerzy Golnik † |
2nd Platoon
| ppor. "Skalski" Tadeusz Schiffers † | | ppor. "Poraj" Stefan Kowalewski † |
3rd Platoon
| ppor. "Zagłoba" Andrzej Sowiński plut. pchor. "Marian" Marian Bielicki † | | sierż. pchor. "Borsuk" Wiesław Brauliński † |
4th Platoon
| ppor. phm. "Kindżał" Leszek Kidziński † |
2nd Company "Rudy"
| plut. pchor. ppor. por. kpt. "Morro" Andrzej Romocki † plut. pchor., ppor. "Drogosław" Jan Więckowski | por. "Florian" Jerzy Jagiełło † |
1st Platoon "Sad"
| por. phm. "Jerzyk" Jerzy Weil † | | ppor. "Sielakowa" Jacek Majewski † |
2nd Platoon "Alek"
| ppor. phm "Kołczan" Eugeniusz Koecher † ppor. phm. "Maryśka" Jan Jaworowski † ppor. phm. "Mały Jędrek" Andrzej Makólski † st. sierż. "Kolka" Czesław Nantel † por. phm. "Xiąże" Andrzej Samsonowicz † ppor. phm. "Lolek" Leonard Pecyna † |
3rd Platoon "Felek"
| por. phm. "Kuba" Konrad Okolski † por. phm. "Słoń" Jerzy Gawin † |
3rd Company "Giewont"
| por. hm. "Giewont" Władysław Cieplak † | ppor. phm. "Czarny Jaś" Jan Wuttke † ppor. hm. "Tadeusz" Jan Kubacki † |
1st Platoon
| ppor. hm. "Howerla" Stanisław Kozicki † |
2nd Platoon
| ppor. "Michał" Michał Glinka |
Female Platoon "Oleńka"
| sanit. "Zosia Duża" Zofia Krassowska † |
Tank Platoon "Wacek"
| por. kpt. "Wacek" hm. Wacław Micuta |
Platoon "Kolegium A"
| ppor. "Śnica" Bolesław Górecki |

== Notable Battalion fighters ==
- Krzysztof Kamil Baczyński
- Roger Barlet
- Ryszard Białous
- Andrzej Cielecki
- Lidia Daniszewska
- Aleksy Dawidowski
- Juliusz Bogdan Deczkowski
- Jerzy Gawin
- Jerzy Jagiełło (porucznik)
- Jacek Karpiński
- Tadeusz Kosudarski
- Jan Kopałka
- Andrzej Łukoski
- Henryk Kozłowski
- Zygmunt Kujawski
- Wacław Micuta
- Tadeusz Maślonkowski
- Wiktor Matulewicz
- Krystyna Niżyńska
- Konrad Okolski
- Jerzy Ossowski
- Jerzy Pepłowski
- Jan Rodowicz
- Eugeniusz Romański
- Andrzej Romocki
- Jan Romocki
- Jan Rossman
- Eugeniusz Stasiecki
- Tadeusz Sumiński
- Anna Wajcowicz
- Kazimierz Wasiłowski
- Jerzy Weil
- Jan Wuttke
- Anna Zakrzewska
- Jan J. Więckowski

== Bibliography ==
- "Pamiętniki żołnierzy baonu Zośka", Nasza Księgarnia, Warsaw 1986 ISBN 83-10-08703-9. (in Polish)
- Agnieszka Pietrzak: Żołnierze Batalionu Armii Krajowej "Zośka" represjonowani w latach 1944–1956. Warsaw: Instytut Pamięci Narodowej, 2008. ISBN 978-83-60464-92-2. (in Polish)
- Aleksander Kamiński: Zośka i Parasol : opowieść o niektórych ludziach i niektórych akcjach dwóch batalionów harcerskich. Warsaw: Iskry, 2009. ISBN 978-83-244-0091-1. (in Polish)
