= Andrzej Romocki =

Polish Home Army soldier (1923–1944)

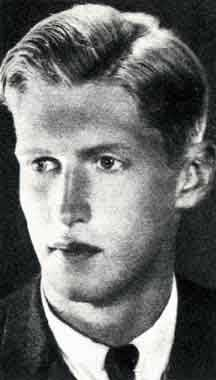
- Born: 16 April 1923; Warsaw, Poland
- Died: 15 September 1944 (aged 21); Warsaw

Andrzej Romocki (16 April 1923 – 15 September 1944), also known by his nom de guerre Morro, was a Polish resistance fighter, scouting instructor and officer of the Home Army (Armia Krajowa). During the Warsaw Uprising of 1944, he commanded the 2nd Company "Rudy" of the Zośka Battalion and served as deputy battalion commander. He was posthumously promoted to captain.

Romocki joined the Polish underground resistance in 1940 and became a member of the Gray Ranks in 1942. He took part in several sabotage and combat operations against German occupation forces before the uprising. During the uprising, he fought in Wola, the Old Town and Czerniaków, notably leading a group of insurgents through German-held territory into central Warsaw on 31 August 1944.

He was killed on 15 September 1944 while attempting to establish contact with troops of the Polish First Army crossing the Vistula. The circumstances of his death remain disputed, with accounts attributing the fatal shot either to German fire or to mistaken fire from Polish or Soviet troops. He was awarded the Silver Cross of the Virtuti Militari and twice the Cross of Valour.

== Wola and Starówka ==
The Zośka Battalion fought in the most difficult areas of Warsaw throughout the uprising. At the beginning of August 1944, Zośka was stationed in the Wola district, where, after early successes by the insurgents, which included the liberation of 350 Jews from the Gęsiówka concentration camp, the Germans launched their first major counter-offensive of the uprising (and also committed some of their worst atrocities - the Wola massacre). After 11 August, when Wola fell, Romocki and the entire Zośka Battalion relocated to Warsaw Old Town ("Starówka" or "Stare Miasto" in Polish), where they fought valiantly for the next three weeks.

By the end of August the Germans were bombing the encircled Old Town from the air every 15–20 minutes while their artillery also shelled the area throughout the day. Wave after wave of attacks by German tanks, Goliath tracked mines and infantry had been repelled by the insurgents despite heavy casualties, but they were nevertheless gradually losing ground to the vastly superior forces deployed against them, while also running out of ammunition, medical supplies, food and water.

After a failed attempt to break out of their encirclement and re-connect the Old Town with the city centre to the south and Żoliborz to the north on 30–31 August, the AK took the reluctant decision to evacuate from the Old Town via the sewers.

Only insurgents from the Zośka Battalion, commanded by Romocki, managed to escape from the Old Town to the city centre on 31 August. At one point they took off their red and white armbands and marched through enemy-held territory as if they were Germans (like many of the insurgents they wore stolen German uniforms adorned with Polish insignia). Zośka lost so many soldiers during the first month of the uprising that Romocki, despite himself being wounded in the face during the escape, became commander of the whole battalion after it relocated to the city centre.

== Czerniaków ==
In early September Zośka was redeployed to the Czerniaków district, on the left bank of the river Vistula. On 15 September 1944, units of the LWP made their first attempt to cross the river and link up with the insurgents in Czerniaków, in spite of Joseph Stalin's ban. The exact circumstances of Romocki's death are uncertain, but it is possible that he was accidentally killed by a soldier of the LWP who mistook Romocki for a German due to the fact that he was wearing a German uniform.

== Awards ==
- Virtuti Militari, V class
- Cross of Valour (Krzyż Walecznych), twice
- Home Army Cross (Krzyż Armii Krajowej) (16 July 1985)

== See also ==
- Jan "Bonawentura" Romocki
