= St. John of God Church, Warsaw =

St. John of God Church
- Kościół św. Jana Bożego w Warszawie
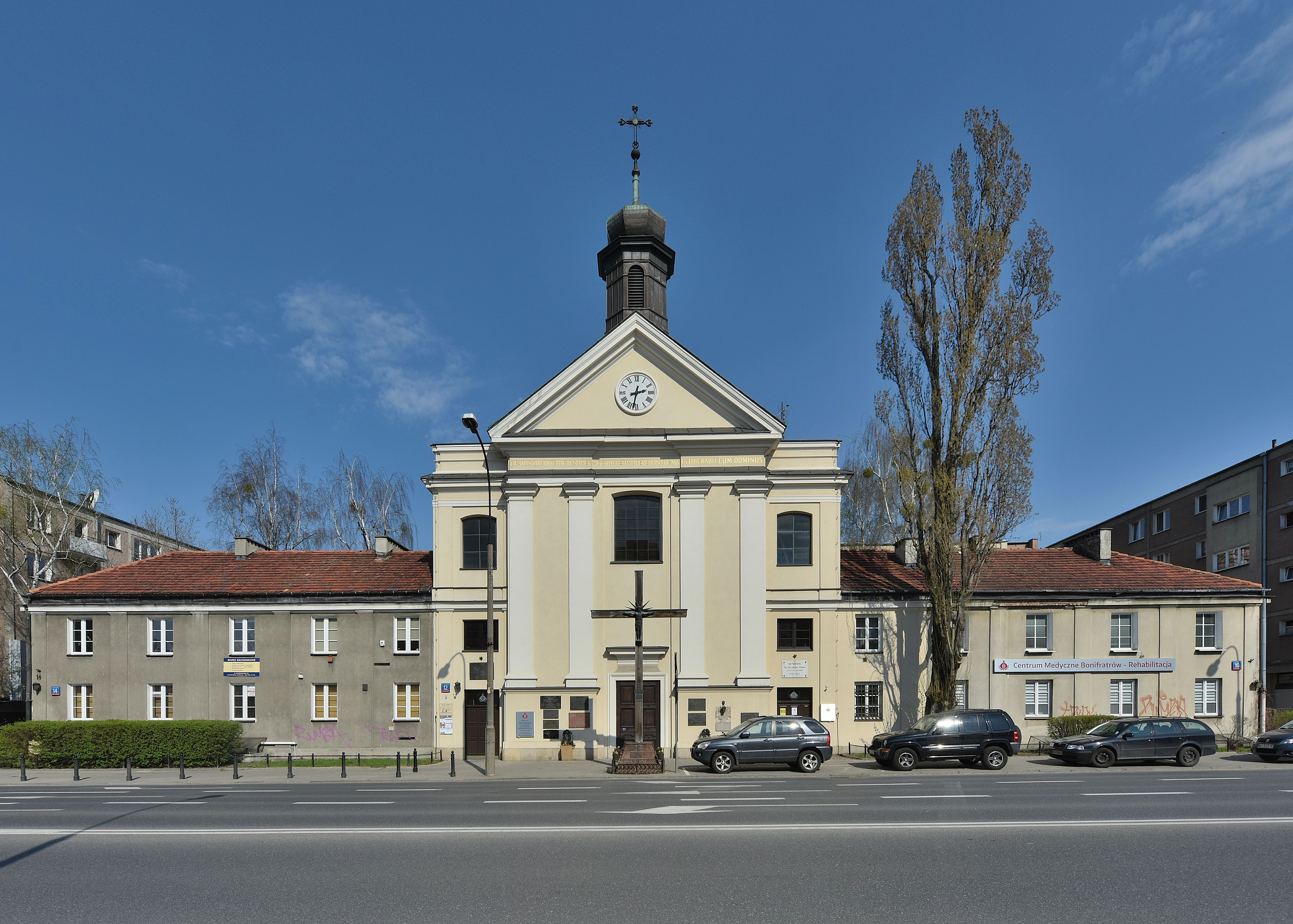
- The front of the church on Bonifraterska Street
- St. John of God Church
- 52.253611°N 21.000556°E
- Location: Warsaw
- Country: Poland
- Denomination: Roman Catholic

Architecture
- Architect(s): Antonio Solari; Jakub Fontana
- Completed: 1728

Administration
- Archdiocese: Warsaw

The St. John of God Church is a Roman Catholic church belonging to the Brothers Hospitallers of St. John of God (the Bonifratrzy). It is located at 12 Bonifraterska Street in Warsaw. From 1976 to 2013 it was the seat of the now defunct parish of St. John of God (Parafia św. Jana Bożego w Warszawie).

== History ==
In 1650, Bogusław Leszczyński, in his hereditary village of Leszno near Warsaw, founded a church and monastery bonifratellom as it was then called the Brothers (Bonifratrów). The first prior of the monastery was a Neapolitan priest Father Modest Genoino, a popular surgeon in Warsaw. The foundation was modest and the location too far from the center. The Brothers Hospitallers were supported by the Morsztyn brothers: clerk to the Crown, Tobiasz Morsztyn and poet and Royal secretary Jan Andrzej Morsztyn.

Seeing how far the church and monastery were from the center of Warsaw, they provided money for its move.

Jan Wielopolski had given Tobiasz Morsztyn a square which was on Wielopole and in this area Jan Andrzej Morsztyn built the Saxon Palace at what is now Piłsudski Square.

The construction of the new church and convent was completed in 1673.

In 1713, Augustus II the Strong bought Morsztyn's palace as his residence and expanded it into neighbouring areas which included the monastery and church. Therefore, funds were allocated for the construction of a new church on the spot where it is now.

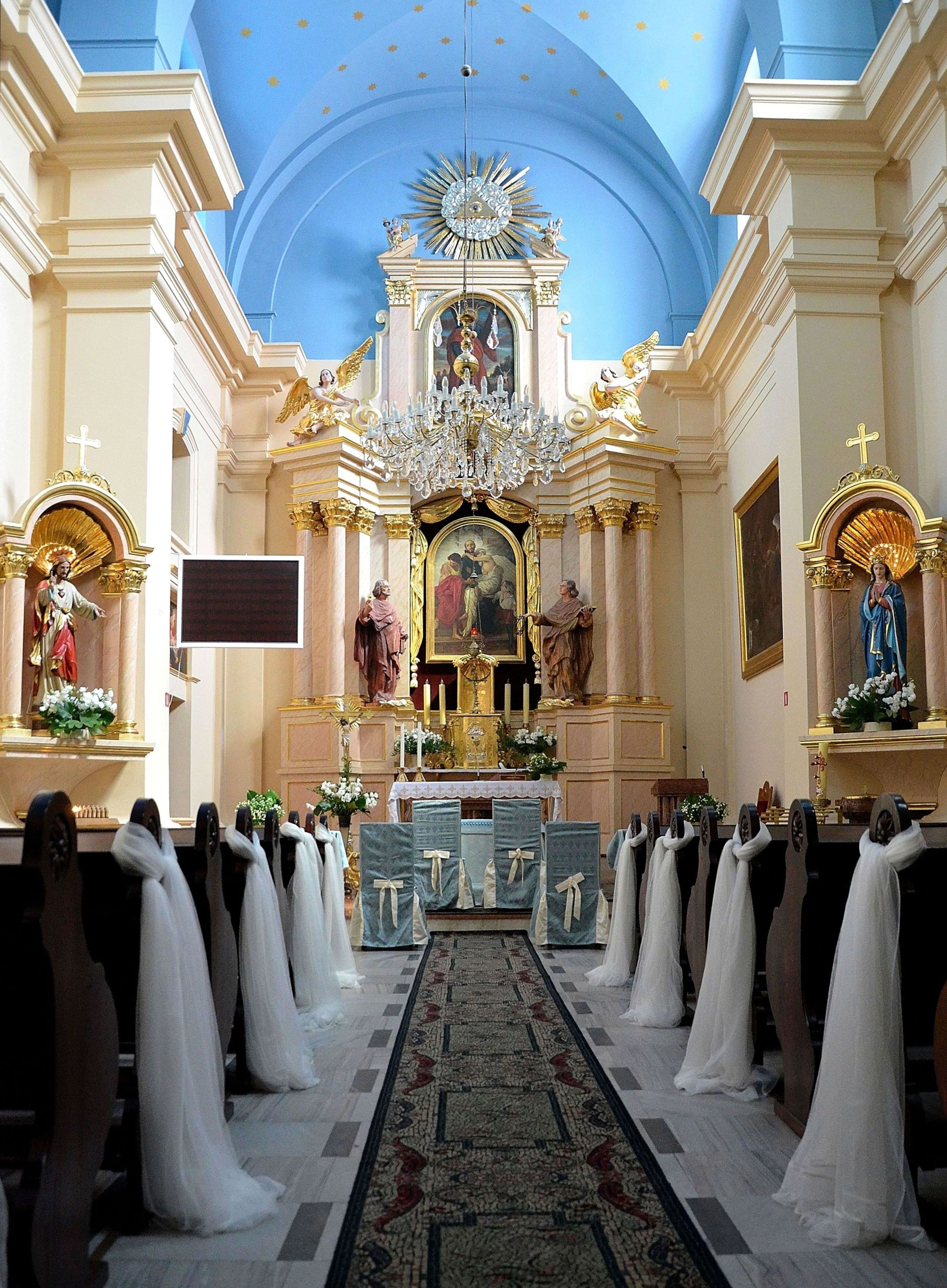
The interior of the church

Work began in 1728 and a few years later, the Bishop of Poznań Jan Joachim Tarło dedicated the church and monastery.

When the church was built, a hospital was also built. Initially, it only had 8 beds. In 1760, Prince August Aleksander Czartoryski, voivode of the Ruthenian province, built a new building for 34 patients and several ancillary rooms. Also, the builder of the church, architect Jakub Fontana left 74,000 złoty for maintenance and to help the sick, in his will dated March 20, 1773. This provision was approved by a parliamentary delegation in 1775.

Initially the brothers were not only priests and sacristan, and the chaplain exercised his priestly ministry. In time, the brothers became interested in medicine for mercy. The former provincial of Poland, Paschal Stirzelheimer received his doctorate in medicine in Zamość.

At the time of the annexation, the Brothers Hospitallers were victimized by the tsarist authorities for helping the insurgents of 1831 and 1863.

During the Warsaw Uprising, the church, hospital and monastic buildings were essential points in the insurgent resistance. They were defended by troop battalions Zośka, Parasol and Watch 49 until 25 August 1944. The buildings suffered badly during these battles.

The church was rebuilt after the war but the hospital was not. Inside the church there are almost no monuments - only the image of St. Andrew from the seventeenth century (by the altar) and the Virgin Mary on the altar. There is a full array of memorials, some of them devoted to the memory of the Home Army and Father Serafinowi Klocowi who enabled and supported the restoration of the church.
