= Wacław Micuta =

Polish economist and WWII veteran

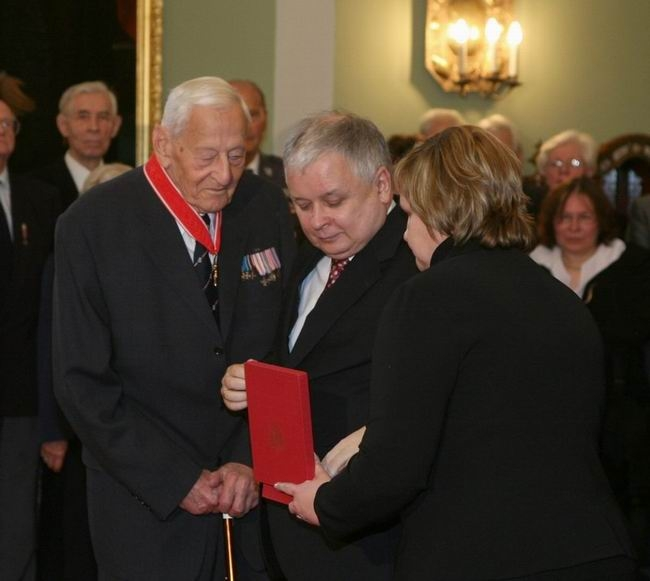
- Micuta (left) receiving the Polonia Restituta medal from Polish President Lech Kaczyński, 10 April 2007
- Born: December 6, 1915; Petrograd, Petrograd Uyezd, Petrograd Governorate, Russian Empire
- Died: September 21, 2008 (aged 92); Geneva, Republic and Canton of Geneva, Switzerland
- Military career
- Allegiance: Polish Armed Forces; Secret Polish Army; Polish People's Republic; United Nations; Polish Armed Forces
- Branch: Zośka Battalion
- Rank: Lieutenant colonel
- Nickname: Wacek
- Unit: Radosław Group
- Conflicts: Battle of the Bzura; Warsaw Uprising
- Awards: Cross of Valour; Virtuti Militari; Order of Polonia Restituta
- Other work: The Renewable Energies Development Institute

Wacław Micuta (pseudonym Wacek; 6 December 1915, in Petrograd, Russia – 21 September 2008, in Geneva, Switzerland) was a Polish economist, World War II veteran, and United Nations functionary.

He took part in the September 1939 defense of Poland and, in the 1944 Warsaw Uprising, commanded one of two tanks that had been captured from the Germans.

== Life ==
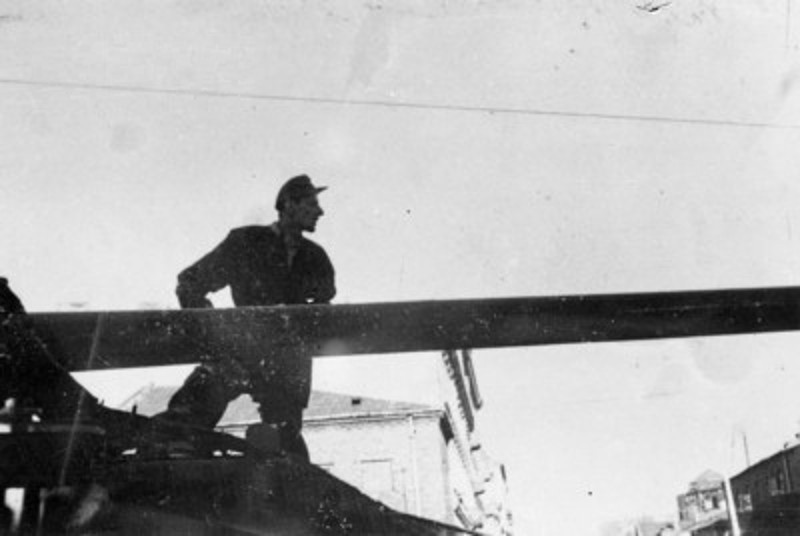
Warsaw Uprising: Micuta, commander of Batalion Zośka armored platoon, on a captured German Panther tank

Micuta was born to a Polish Kresy family in Petrograd, Russia. He was the son of Leonard Micuta (1885-1916) and Wanda Pawłowicz (1880-1956). In 1922 his family moved to Poznań, in western Poland, where he completed secondary school and studied economics. He was also active in the scouting movement. He finished his military enlistment at Włodzimierz Wołyński, in eastern Poland, in the rank of second lieutenant.

After completing his studies in June 1939, he became secretary to the Governor of Silesia Province, Michał Grażyński, but he held this position only briefly due to the outbreak of World War II.

Mobilized, he took part in the September Campaign of 1939, fighting, among others, at the Battle of the Bzura. On 19 September, during an attack on German positions at Laski, he suffered a serious wound to his right hand. Captured and sent to a German prisoner-of-war camp, he escaped in 1940 and made his way to Warsaw.

There he was brought into the Armed Resistance by Jan Nowak-Jeziorański. At first he was adjutant to Major Jan Włodarkiewicz. However, in September 1940 he became a Szare Szeregi (boy-scout soldiers) instructor. After 1941 he served as an instructor in Lwów until July 1942, when he was arrested by the Gestapo. Under interrogation and torture he confessed to nothing and gave up none of his underground comrades. Thanks to friends' efforts on his behalf, after several months he was freed. He resumed underground activity and was promoted to first lieutenant.

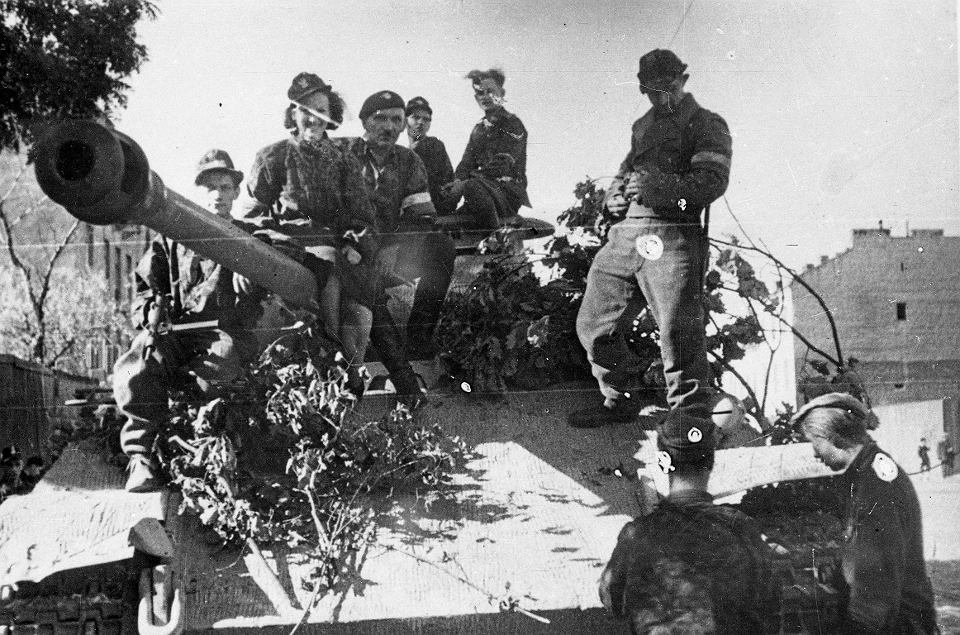
Batalion Zośka armored platoon on a captured German Panther tank

In summer 1944, Micuta returned to Warsaw, where he became a special-assignments officer for the Home Army's Scouting Batalion Zośka. During the Warsaw Uprising the battalion captured two German Panther tanks, and Micuta was made commander of a newly formed armored platoon (unique in its kind on the insurgent side) which fought in Warsaw's Wola district.

Micuta was the actual commander of one of the captured tanks, which was nicknamed Magda, and used it in an operation which liberated the Gęsiówka concentration camp. The operation freed some 350 Polish, Greek, Hungarian and French Jews. One of the freed inmates, Henryk Lederman, organized a battalion from the liberated Jews, which he presented to Micuta. This unit fought under Micuta for the remainder of the uprising, according to Micuta "[fighting] like mad... I think only three of them survived."

On 11 August 1944 the Polish insurgents had to abandon the captured tanks, which had been heavily damaged, and evacuated Wola via the sewer system for Warsaw's Old Town.

In subsequent fighting Micuta was wounded in his left lung, but after a short stay at an insurgent hospital he returned to battle, later taking part in fighting in the Czerniaków and Śródmieście districts.

During the Uprising he was promoted to captain.

== Postwar ==
After the war, Micuta kept his activities with the Home Army secret from the Communist authorities, who were prosecuting and persecuting former Home Army members. He worked in Zakopane and Łódź as a driving instructor. From 1946 he worked in the Ministry of Central Planning.

In 1948 he obtained permission to travel with his family to Switzerland, where he decided to remain. He began working for the United Nations Economic Commission for Europe and afterwards in other U.N. commissions. His tasks included compiling economic data and writing economic reports about Poland and other countries of the Eastern Bloc. In 1960 he volunteered to take part in a U.N. peace mission to the war-torn Belgian Congo. He also participated in other missions in Rwanda and Burundi. Between 1965 and 1968 he was vice president of the U.N. Development Program for Europe. He served as U.N. representative in the Republic of Chad. In 1971 he was Deputy Director of Operations for the U.N.'s Division on Narcotic Drugs.

After retiring in 1976, Micuta continued his activities on behalf of developing countries. He was also a pioneer in, and tireless promoter of, renewable energy and founder of the Renewable Energies Development Institute in Geneva. While working for the institute, he developed a low-cost fuel-efficient stove which could be easily constructed and used in poor countries. This stove design was published by the HEDON Household Energy Network in their journal, Boiling Point.

He was the author of numerous professional publications and recipient of a number of awards. He was active in the Organization of Poles in Switzerland and in organizations concerned with Polish-Jewish relations. In February 2000 he was promoted to lieutenant colonel of the Polish Armed Forces on inactive duty.

He died on 21 September 2008 in Geneva.

== Awards ==
For his part in the Polish September 1939 Campaign, Micuta received the Cross of Valor and the Order of Virtuti Militari. He was awarded a second Virtuti Militari for his part in the Warsaw Uprising.

On 10 April 2007 he was awarded the Cross with Star of the Order of Polonia Restituta.

== See also ==
- Polish resistance movement in World War II
- Warsaw Uprising
- Gęsiówka
- List of Poles
