= Jan Romocki =

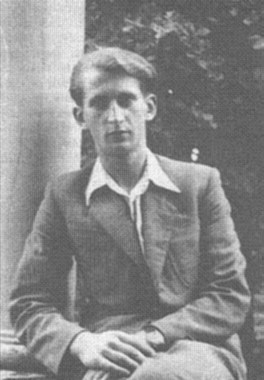
- ps. "Bonawentura"
- Born: 17 April 1925; Warsaw, Poland
- Died: 18 August 1944 (aged 19); Warsaw, Poland

Jan Romocki codename: Bonawentura (17 April 1925 – 18 August 1944) was a Polish Scoutmaster (podharcmistrz), Second Lieutenant of AK-Szare Szeregi, poet and younger brother of fellow resistance figure Andrzej "Morro" Romocki.

Romocki was born in Warsaw, Second Polish Republic, and died in a hospital at 23 Miodowa Street in Warsaw during the Warsaw Uprising after it was bombed in a German air raid.

== Awards ==
- Cross of Valour (Krzyż Walecznych) - 4 August 1944
- Silver Cross of the Virtuti Militari, Class V - 21 August 1944
- Home Army Cross (Krzyż Armii Krajowej) - 16 July 1985
