= Juliusz Bogdan Deczkowski =

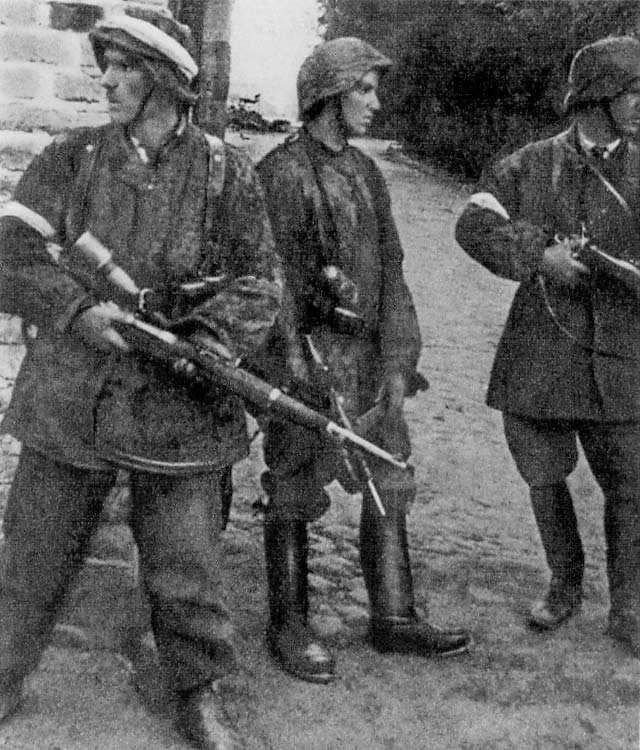
- Soldiers of "Zośka" batalion on Wola during the Warsaw Uprising. Juliusz Bogdan Deczkowski is in the centre. The other two men in this photo were killed during the uprising.
- Born: 20 April 1924; Poland
- Died: 22 June 1998 (aged 74); Poland
- Occupations: Soldier during World War II, and later an engineer and inventor

Juliusz Bogdan Deczkowski "Laudański" (20 April 1924 in Bydgoszcz – 22 June 1998 in Ciechocinek) was a noted Polish soldier during World War II, and later an engineer and inventor, as well as writer.

== Life ==
Deczkowski left school in 1939, the year of the September Campaign, and joined the Home Army. During the invasion, he became a runner with the Polish Scouting Association, which was then operating as the underground Szare Szeregi. In 1944, he took part in the Warsaw Uprising as a member of the Batalion Zośka.

In 1949, during the darkest years of Stalinism in Poland, he was arrested by the Polish security service and in 1950, he was convicted and sentenced by a military court to 5 years in prison. After the death of Joseph Stalin, he was released from prison on 23 March 1953. After his release, he graduated from the Warsaw University of Technology in November 1953, and became an inventor of medical equipment. On 29 December 1956, the Supreme Court of Poland rehabilitated him, clearing his name from his 1950 conviction.

He published in Poland two books of wartime memoirs "Wspomnienia żołnierza baonu AK "Zośka" and "Wróbel" z "Kamieni na szaniec".

== Works ==
- Juliusz Bogdan Deczkowski "Pamiętniki żołnierzy baonu "Zośka" I edition – 1957, VI edition in 1997 ISBN 83-10-07687-8
- Juliusz Bogdan Deczkowski "Wspomnienia żołnierza baonu AK "Zośka", Instytut PAN, 1998 ISBN 83-88909-18-5
- Juliusz Bogdan Deczkowski "Wróbel" z "Kamieni na szaniec", Ascon, 1992 ISBN 83-87545-23-6

== See also ==
- List of Poles
