= Eugeniusz Stasiecki =

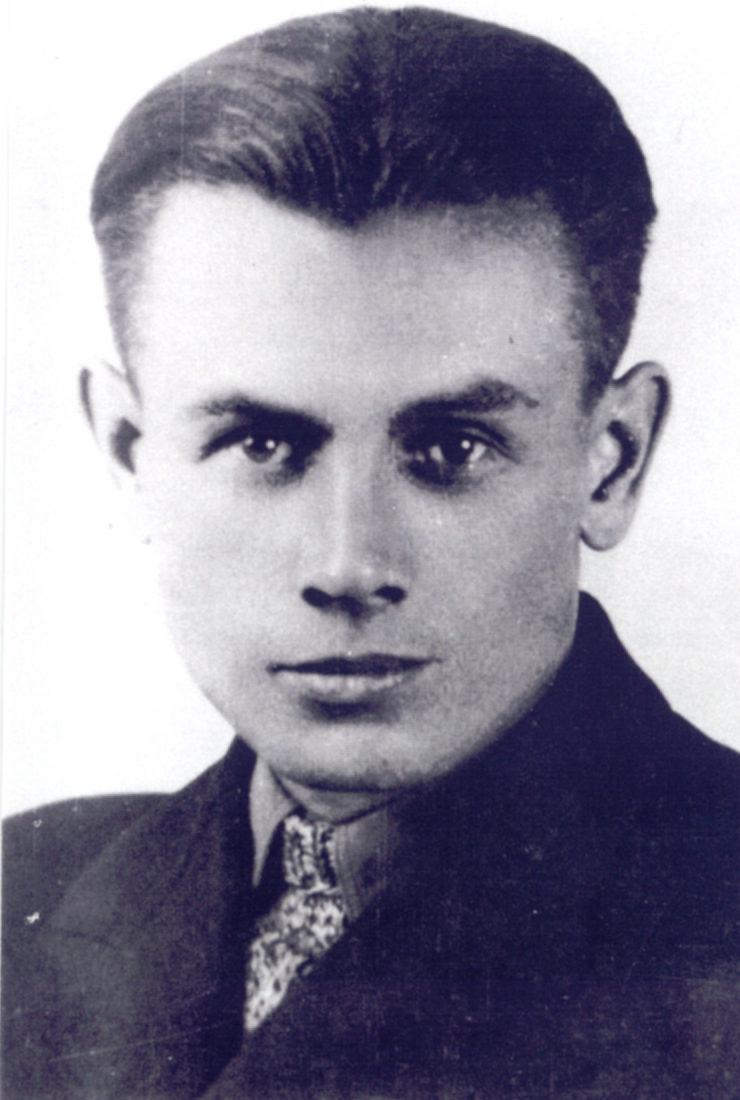
- Stasiecki in 1944
- Born: 19 February 1913; Radom, Congress Poland, Russian Empire
- Died: 16 August 1944 (aged 31); Warsaw, Poland

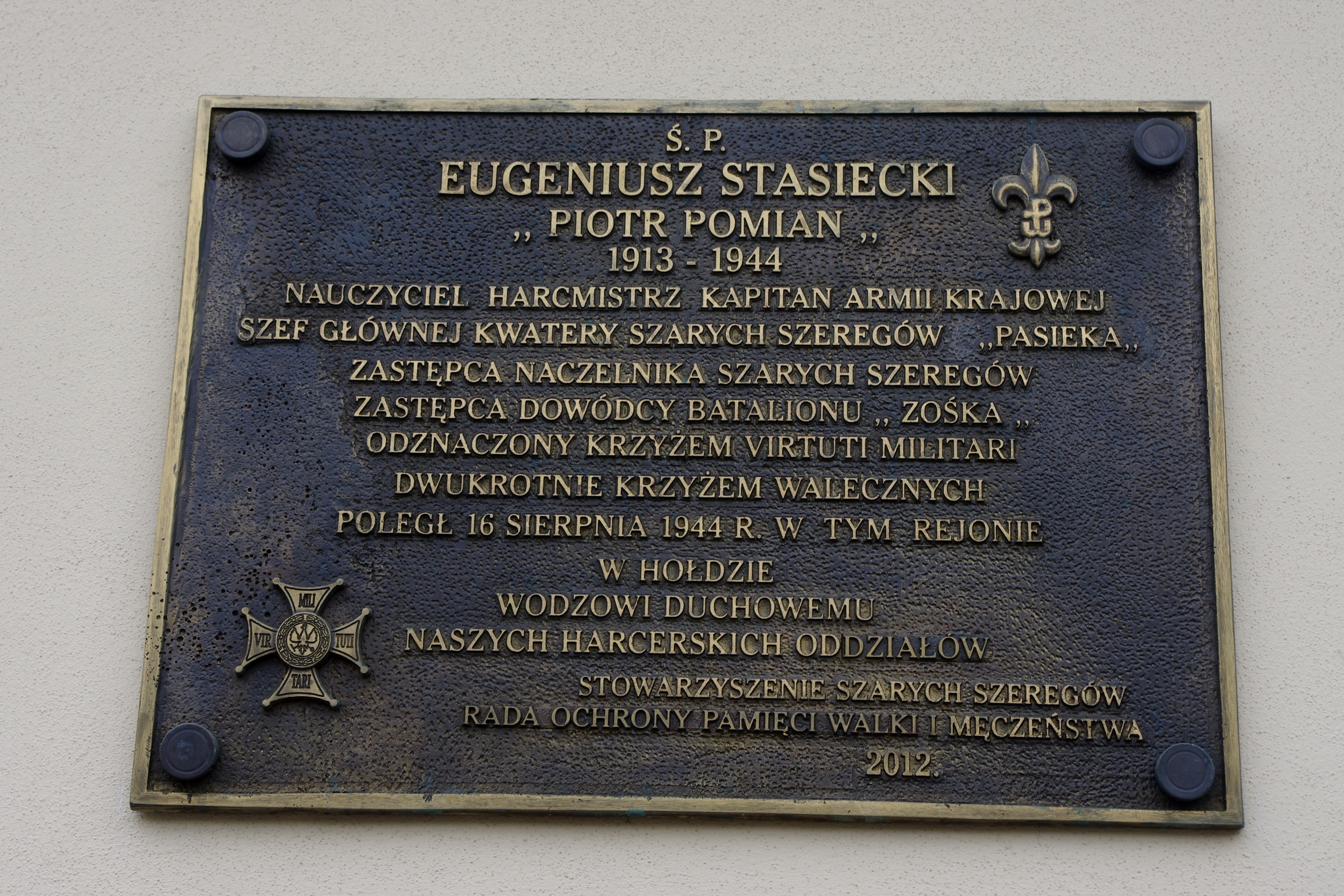
Stasiecki's plaque at the Church of John of God in Warsaw

Eugeniusz Stasiecki (codenames: Piotr Pomian, Poleski, Piotr) was a scoutmaster (harcmistrz) in the scouting movement in Poland and was a leader in the underground paramilitary scouting association AK-Szare Szeregi during World War II.

Stasiecki was born on 19 February 1913 in Radom, Poland. He died in fighting in the Warsaw Uprising on the night of 16 August 1944 at the age of 31. A plaque commemorating him is found at Church of John of God, Warsaw.

== Awards ==
- Cross of Valour (Krzyż Walecznych), twice
- Virtuti Militari, V class (15 August 1944)
