= Radosław Group =

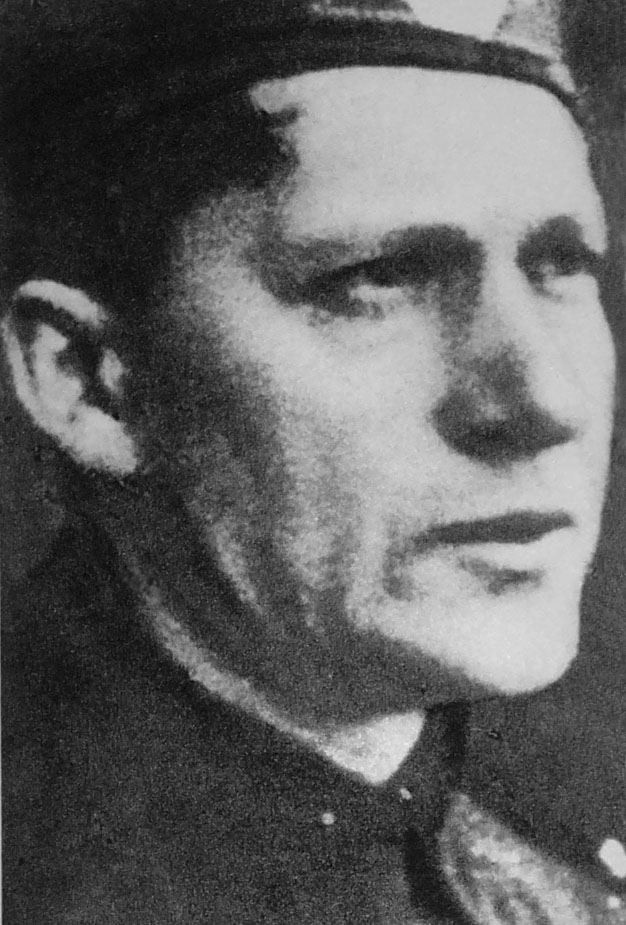
Jan Mazurkiewicz, "Radosław", the commander of the Group.

Radosław Group (Polish: Zgrupowanie Radosław) was the codename of a group of units of the Kedyw, a Polish World War II Armia Krajowa organization, during World War II. It was created shortly before the outbreak of the Warsaw Uprising in 1944 and was destroyed during it.

== Organization ==
The Radosław Group took its name from the pseudonym of its leader, Jan Mazurkiewicz, the chief of conspiratorial diversionary units of General Headquarters of Armia Krajowa and Kedyw.

Composition of the group:

- Diversionary Brigade Broda 53 – Cpt. J.K. Andrzejewski, later R. Białous
- Battalion Czata 49 – Maj. Tadeusz Runge ps. "Witold"
- Battalion Miotła (Broom) – Cpt. Franciszek Mazurkiewicz ps. "Niebora"
- Battalion Parasol (Umbrella) – Cpt. Adam Borys ps. "Pług"
- Battalion Pięść (Fist) – Maj. Alfons Kotowski ps. "Okoń"
- Reserve Battalion Igor – Maj. Tadeusz Grzmielewski ps. "Igor".
- Battalion Zośka – Lt./Cpt. Ryszard Białous ps. "Jerzy"

== During the Warsaw Uprising ==
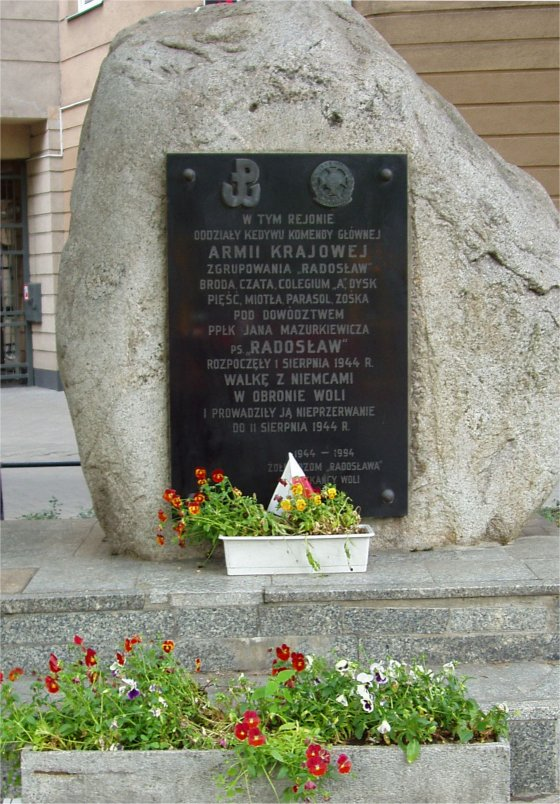
A commemorative stone on Warsaw's Okopowa Street where the Radosław Group began its fight during the Warsaw Uprising.

Before W-hour, the group was located in the Wola district near the cemeteries and Okopowa, Młynarska and Kercelaka streets. The strategic goal of the group was to take control of the Wola district and protect the Headquarters of the AK, which was stationed nearby on Dzika Street.

During the fighting the Zośka Battalion, which was largely made up of Polish Boy Scouts, attacked the Gęsiówka concentration camp, which was being liquidated at the time, and freed 383 prisoners, including 350 Jews, most of whom joined the unit and fought in its ranks for the remainder of the uprising. The group also managed to establish contact with the Stare Miasto district of Warsaw, controlled Okopowa street, captured several arms depots and took part in heavy fighting in the areas around Młynarska, Wolska, Żytnia, and Karolkowa streets.

In mid August the group took part in an unsuccessful attack on German positions near the Gdańska station, the aim of which was to connect with the insurgent forces in Żoliborz. Due to increasing enemy pressure, units of the group retreated from the area. At the end of August, battalions Czata 49 and Broda 53 began a night operation in an attempt to link with Śródmieście district. Due to the lack of success of the attack, an order was issued to evacuate the insurgent members and civilians authorities through the sewers into Śródmieście. The main part of the group evacuated on the night of September 1. On 2 September, members of Radosław Group emerged from the sewers in Warsaw New Town, near the corner of Warecka St.

On the night of 4 September, the unit deployed in the Czerniaków district near Książęca and Ludna streets, along Rozbrat street, and along the Vistula river from Łazienkowska Street on. The purpose of the deployment was to support Krysek Group, which had been fighting in Czerniaków from the beginning of the uprising. The task of the groups was to hold positions on the Vistula river, as the insurgents expected incoming help (which never arrived) from the Red Army which was stationed on the other bank of the river in the Praga district.

The defense of Powiśle collapsed on 6 September. The Germans began a mass attack on Czerniaków. During the fighting communications with units in the town centre were cut off. The only way to Śródmieście and Mokotów, where the insurgents were still defending themselves, was once again through the sewers. Consequently, due to high combat losses and lack of ammunition, Col. "Radosław" made the decision to evacuate through the canals to Mokotów on the night of September 19. Battalions Czata and Broda held of the Germans while the evacuation took place, and defended their positions until September 22.

The remains of the group took part in further fighting in Mokotów. After plans of an attempt at a break out to the Chojnowski forest were abandoned, on 25 September around 120 soldiers evacuated to Śródmieście through the sewers where they joined up with around 230 soldiers and officers. That is all that was left of a combat group which on September 1 had around 2,300 soldiers.
