= Gęsiówka =

Former prison and Nazi concentration camp in Warsaw, Poland

Coordinates: 52°14′40.7″N 20°58′44.18″E

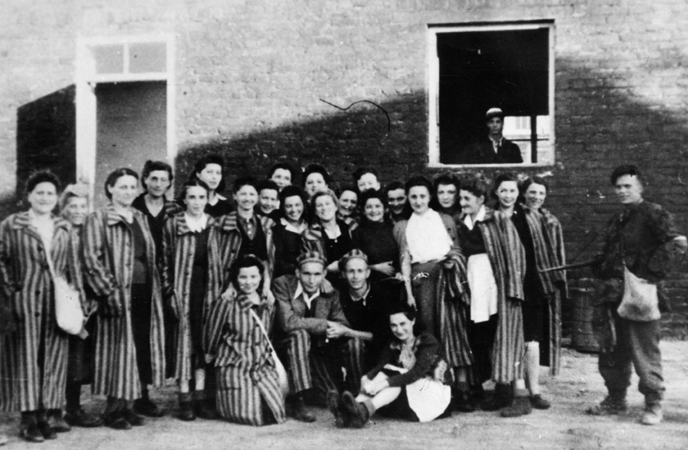
- Liberated Jewish women with Polish resistance fighters of the Zośka Battalion, 5 August 1944
- Interactive map of Gęsiówka
- Location: Warsaw, Poland
- Opened: 1875
- Closed: 1956
- Former name: Waffen-SS Konzentrationslager Warschau

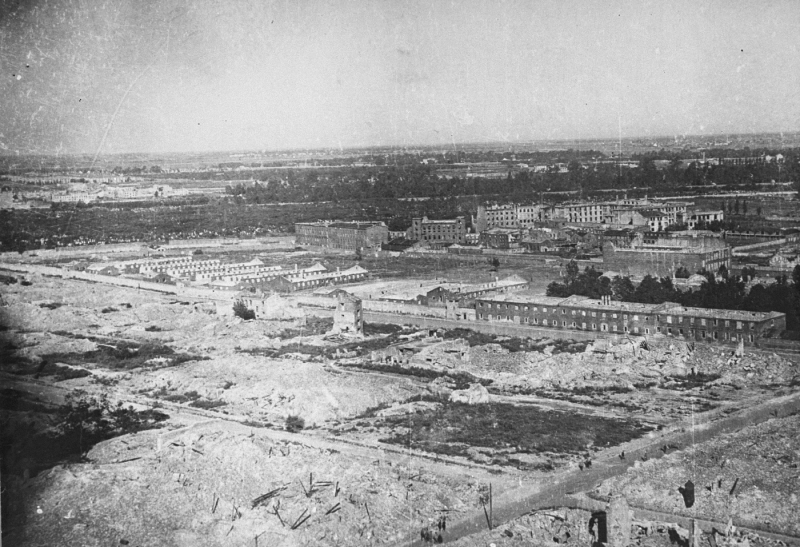
View from a tower of St. Augustine Church on Nowolipki 18 Street towards Warsaw Ghetto. In front ruins on Pawia Street behind them surrounded by high wall with watch towers, is the west side of the Gesiowka prison. The Jewish cemetery on Okopowa Street is visible in the background on the left behind Gesiowka prison. Spring 1945

Gęsiówka (Polish pronunciation: [ɡɛ̃ˈɕufka]) is the colloquial Polish name for a prison that once existed on Gęsia ("Goose") Street in Warsaw, Poland, and which, under German occupation during World War II, became a Nazi concentration camp.

After the war, in 1945–56, the Gęsiówka served as a prison and labour camp, operated first by the Soviet NKVD to imprison Polish resistance fighters of the Home Army and other opponents of Poland's new Stalinist regime, then by the regime's secret police UB (later SB).

== History ==
Before World War II, the Gęsiówka was a Polish Army military prison on Gęsia Street (now Anielewicza Street), near the intersection with Okopowa Street and the Okopowa Street Jewish Cemetery. Beginning in 1939, with the German occupation of Poland, it became a re-education camp of the German security police (Arbeitserziehungslager der Sicherheitspolizei Warschau).

In 1943 the prison was turned into a concentration camp, mostly for Jewish prisoners from countries other than Poland, particularly from Greece and Hungary. Over the course of its operation, the camp, known as the Warsaw concentration camp, housed an estimated 8,000–9,000 prisoners, who were engaged in slave labor. 4,000 to 5,000 prisoners are estimated to have died in the camp, during the death march from the camp, during the Warsaw Uprising, and while in hiding after the Uprising.

The former Gęsiówka prison is now the site of the POLIN Museum of the History of Polish Jews.

== Liberation during Warsaw Uprising ==
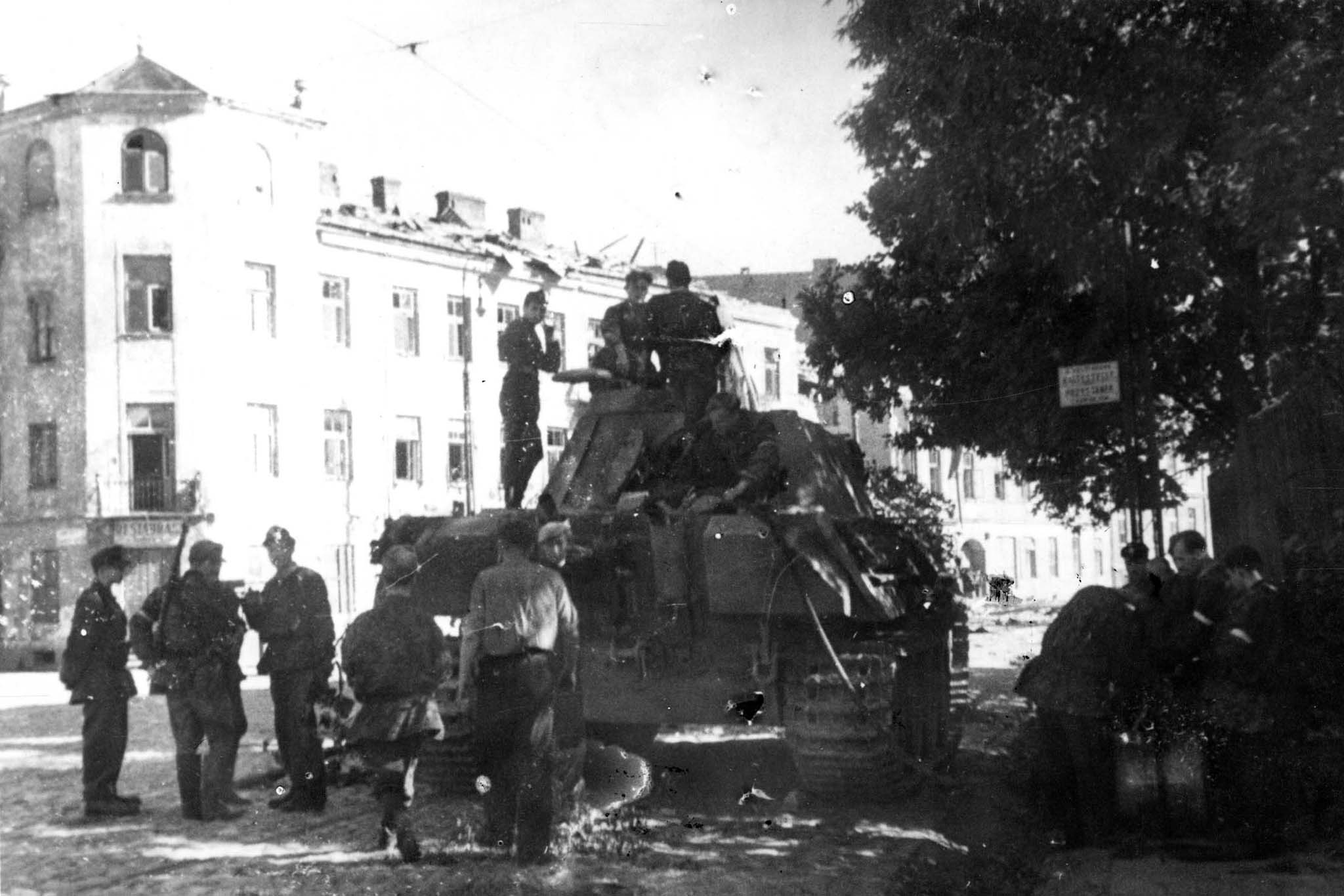
Soldiers of the Wacek armored platoon of the Zośka Battalion, corner of Okopowa and Żytnia Streets, 2 August 1944

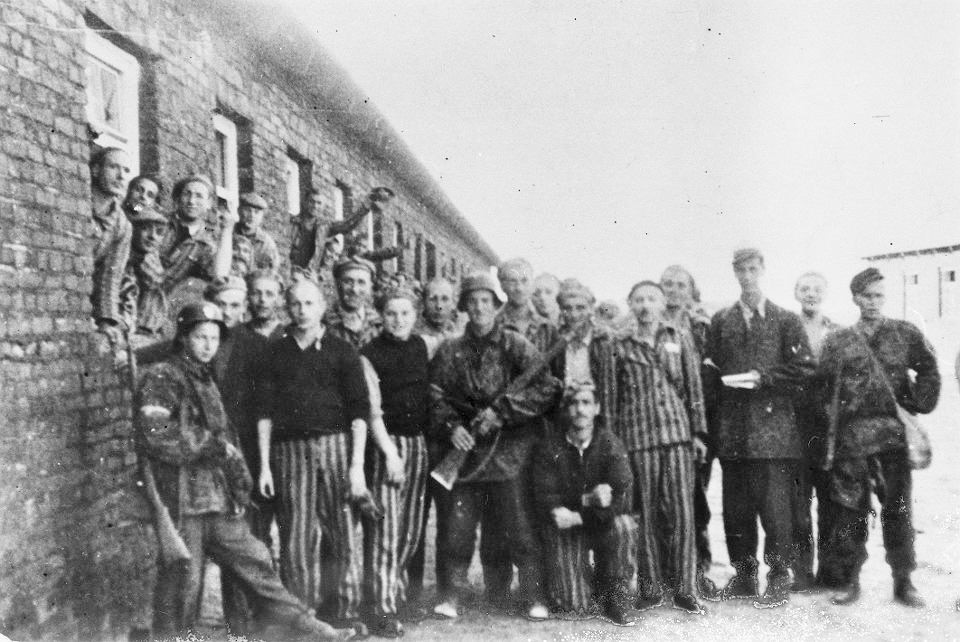
Jewish prisoners of Gęsiówka and Polish resistance fighters of the Home Army's "Zośka" battalion after the camp's liberation in August 1944

On 5 August 1944, early in the Warsaw Uprising, the Zośka Battalion of the Home Army's Radosław Group, led by Ryszard Białous and Eugeniusz Stasiecki, attacked the Gęsiówka camp, which was being liquidated by the Germans. Magda, one of two Panther tanks that had been captured by Polish insurgents on 2 August, and assigned to Zośka's newly formed armoured platoon commanded by Wacław Micuta, supported the assault with fire from its main gun. In the one-and-a-half-hour battle, most of the SD guards were killed or captured, though some fled toward the Pawiak prison.

Only two Polish fighters were killed in the attack. Rescued from certain death were 348 able-bodied Jewish prisoners who had been retained by the Germans as slave labour after the Germans' 1943 liquidation of the Warsaw Ghetto and had been left behind after the evacuation of most of the Gęsiówka camp's inmates in July 1944.

Many of the Jewish prisoners joined the ranks of the insurgents, and most were killed in the next nine weeks of fighting, as were most of their liberators (the Zośka battalion lost 70% of its members in the Uprising).

== After World War II ==
In January 1945 Gęsiówka was used by the Soviet NKVD to imprison Polish resistance fighters of the Home Army and other opponents of Poland's new Stalinist regime, who were kept there in poor conditions. The Polish communist secret police took over the administration of the camp later that year and continued to use it as a prison and labour camp for criminal and political prisoners, including so-called class enemies, until 1956.

== Gęsiówka liberation memorial ==
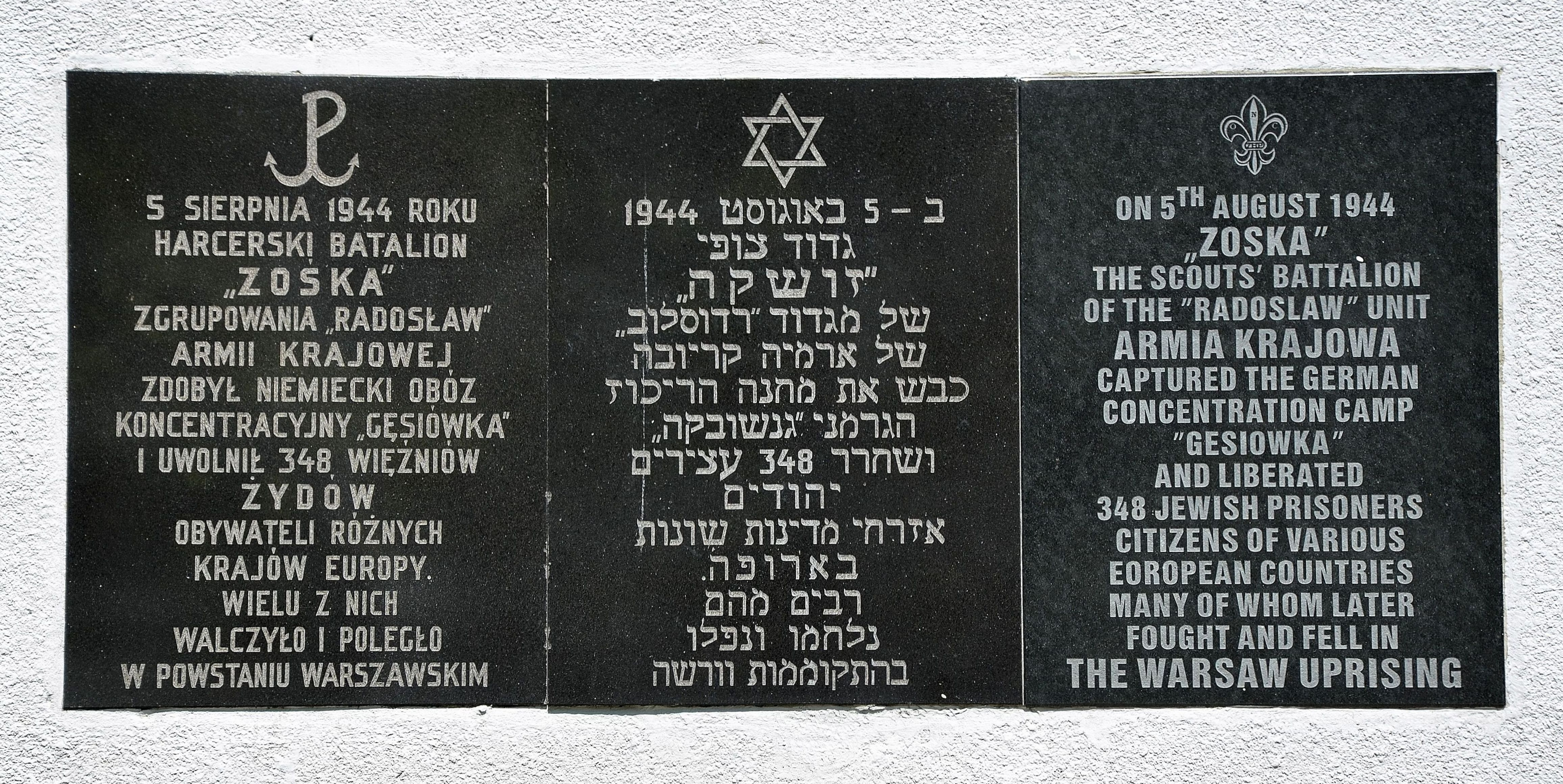

The Gęsiówka was demolished in the 1960s. The only visible evidence of its previous existence is a plaque, on the wall of 34 Anielewicza Street, commemorating the camp's 1944 liberation.

The memorial was unveiled during the commemoration of the fiftieth anniversary of the Warsaw Uprising in 1994. Wacław Micuta, commander of the armoured platoon of the Zośka battalion, said the following words at the ceremony:

On 27th July the Germans decided to evacuate the Gęsiówka camp to Dachau. More than 400 inmates, incapable of marching, were shot....A column of about 4,000 Jews was marched off, but disappeared without trace. And now the Zośka battalion was standing in front of this camp. They remembered the Scouting Statute, which says that a scout is a friend to every other human being and a brother to every other scout. We all wanted to attack immediately....and since we had captured a couple of tanks, the situation was rather better than in the previous days. So four of us went back to "Radosław" [Jan Mazurkiewicz, commander of the insurgent forces in Warsaw's Wola district] to ask for permission. Radosław was a cautious man and shared the view that the fortified positions should not be attacked frontally. But he agreed on condition that the attacking force be small in number and be composed entirely of volunteers....We carried it off by surprise. Our tank was a great success because the Germans [in the camp] had no anti-tank weapons. After the main gateway was destroyed Felek's platoon moved in....

The memorial features inscriptions in Polish, Hebrew and English.

== Gallery ==
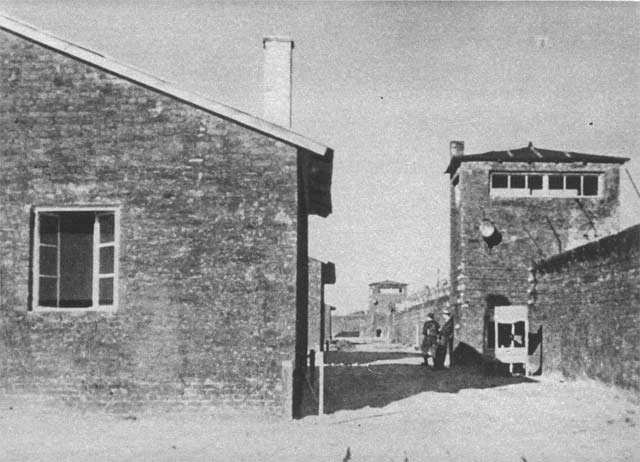
Polish resistance fighters from the "Giewont" company of the "Zośka" battalion secure Gęsiówka after the liberation (5 August 1944)

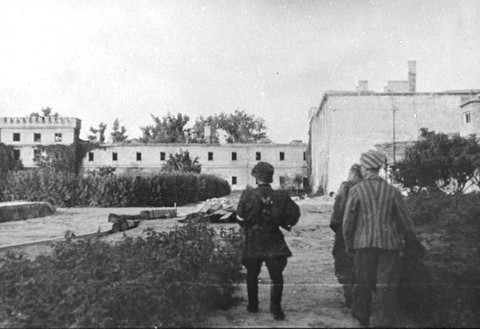
Gęsiówka after the liberation – in the picture, a Polish resistance fighter and two of the 348 liberated Jews (5 August 1944)

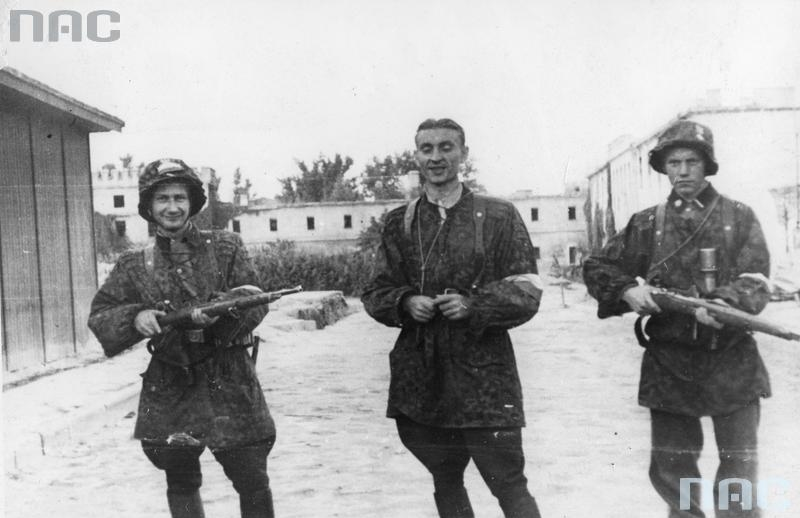
Three Polish resistance fighters pictured after liberating the "Gęsiówka” concentration camp – from left to right: an unknown insurgent, Stanisław Kozicki (code name "Howerla") and Wacław Cyniak (code name "Orlicz")

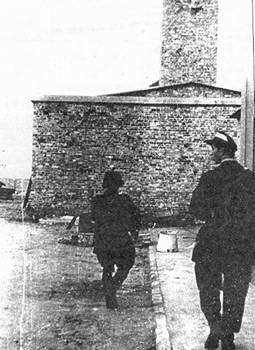
Polish resistance fighters from the "Giewont" company of the "Zośka" battalion secure Gęsiówka after the liberation. The crematorium building is visible in the background

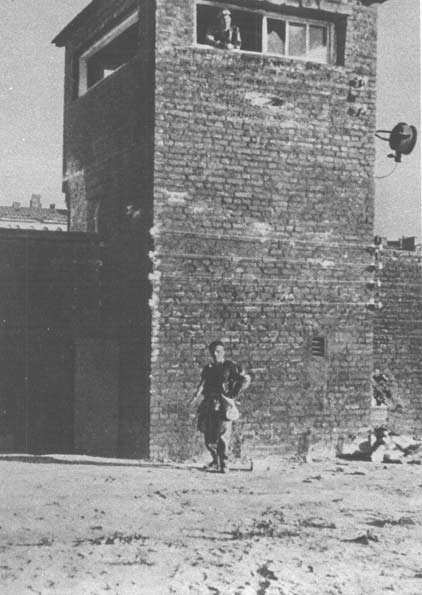
Polish resistance fighters in the Gęsiówka watchtower after the liberation

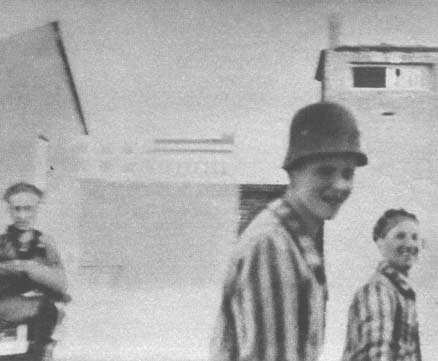
Liberated Jewish prisoners – one wearing a German Stahlhelm – smiling for the camera

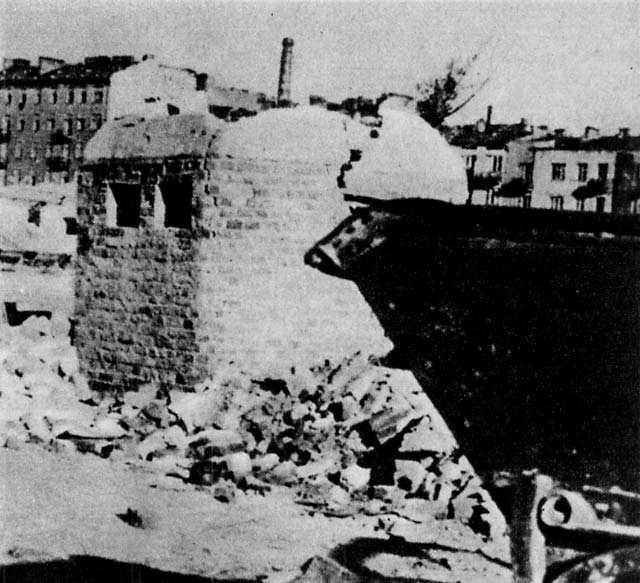
Gęsiówka bunker destroyed by soldiers of the "Zośka" battalion

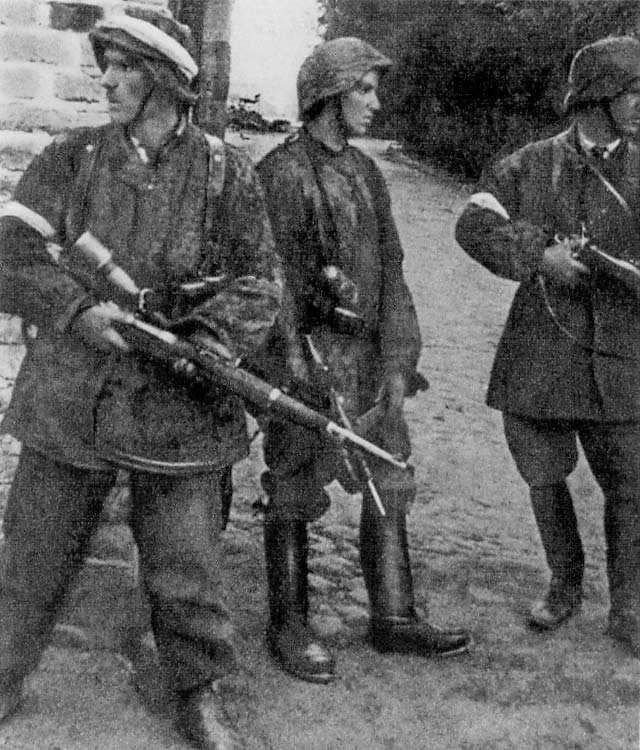
Three Polish resistance fighters pictured after liberating the "Gęsiówka" concentration camp – from left to right: Wojciech Omyła (code name “Wojtek"), Juliusz Bogdan Deczkowski (code name “Laudański") and Tadeusz Milewski (code name "Ćwik")

== See also ==
- Chronicles of Terror
- Central Arrest in the Warsaw Ghetto
- German camps in occupied Poland during World War II
- Pawiak
- Polish resistance movement in World War II
- Wacław Micuta
- Warsaw concentration camp
- Warsaw Uprising
