= Ryszard Białous =

Polish Army officer

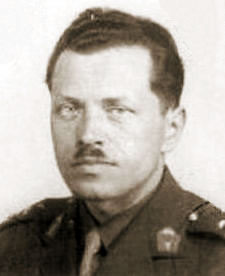

Personal details
- Born: April 4, 1914 Warsaw, Kingdom of Poland
- Died: March 24, 1992 (aged 77) Neuquén, Argentina

Military service
- Allegiance: Polish Armed Forces; Home Army
- Branch/service: Zośka Battalion
- Rank: Kapitan (Captain)
- Battles/wars: Warsaw Uprising

Ryszard Białous codename: Jerzy (b. 4 April 1914 in Warsaw - 24 March 1992 in Neuquén, Argentina) was a Polish scoutmaster (harcmistrz) captain of the AK-Szare Szeregi. Commander of the Batalion Zośka before and during the Warsaw Uprising. He was also known under the noms de guerre "Zygmunt" and "Taran".

== Promotions ==
- Podporucznik (Second lieutenant) - January 1941
- Porucznik (First lieutenant) - May 1943
- Kapitan (Captain) - September 1944

== Awards ==
- Silver Cross of Virtuti Militari
- Commander's Cross with Star of Order of Polonia Restituta ( posthumously,31 July 2019)
- Knight's Cross of Order of Polonia Restituta (3 May 1966)
- Krzyż Walecznych (three times)
- Golden Cross of Merit for ZHP (posthumously 19 July 2019)
