= Defense of the Wola cemeteries =

Defensive battles during World War II in Warsaw

Defense of Wola cemeteries
- Part of Warsaw Uprising
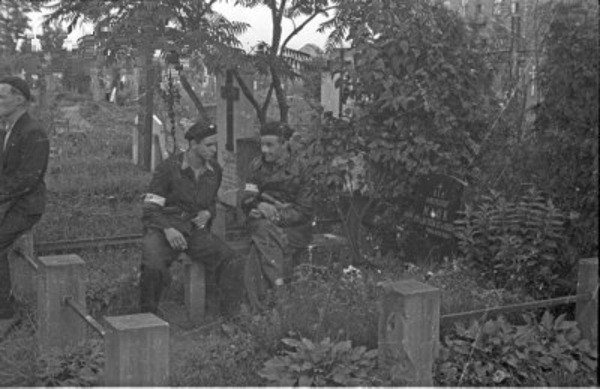
- Soldiers of the Pięść Battalion among the graves of the Evangelical cemetery
Date	6–11 August 1944
Location	Complex of religious cemeteries and the area of Okopowa Street in Warsaw's Wola district
Result	German victory

Belligerents
Polish Underground State	Nazi Germany

Commanders and leaders
Jan Mazurkiewicz; Wacław Janaszek	Heinz Reinefarth; Willi Schmidt; Max Reck

Strength
About 1,650 soldiers 2 captured tanks	About 3,800 soldiers and policemen supported by armored vehicles, artillery, and aviation Armored Train No. 75

Casualties and losses
50% of the original state of the Radosław Group	Unknown

The defense of the Wola cemeteries consisted of defensive battles in the area of Powązki and Okopowa Street in Warsaw, conducted by soldiers of the Home Army's Kedyw during the Warsaw Uprising.

From August 6 to 11, 1944, the units of the Radosław Group fiercely defended the cemetery zone in Wola. Fighting in partial encirclement, they managed to tie down significant enemy forces in this area, thereby giving the Home Army command time to organize the defense of the Old Town. Not having received permission from superiors to evacuate to the nearby Kampinos Forest, Lieutenant Colonel Jan Mazurkiewicz, codenamed Radosław, was ultimately forced to withdraw his units through the ruins of the Warsaw Ghetto to the Old Town. The battles in defense of the Wola cemeteries cost the Radosław Group more than half of its original personnel.

== Prelude ==
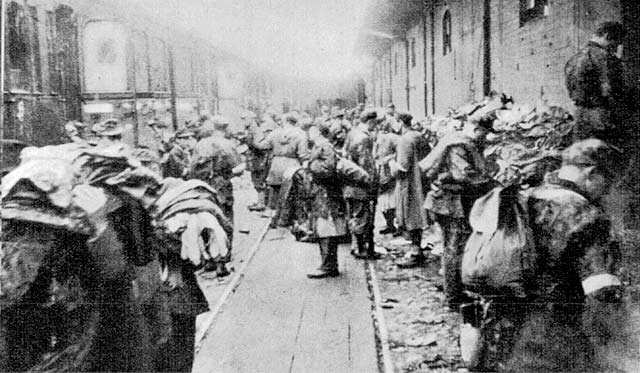
Home Army soldiers in captured warehouses at Stawki Street, 1 August 1944

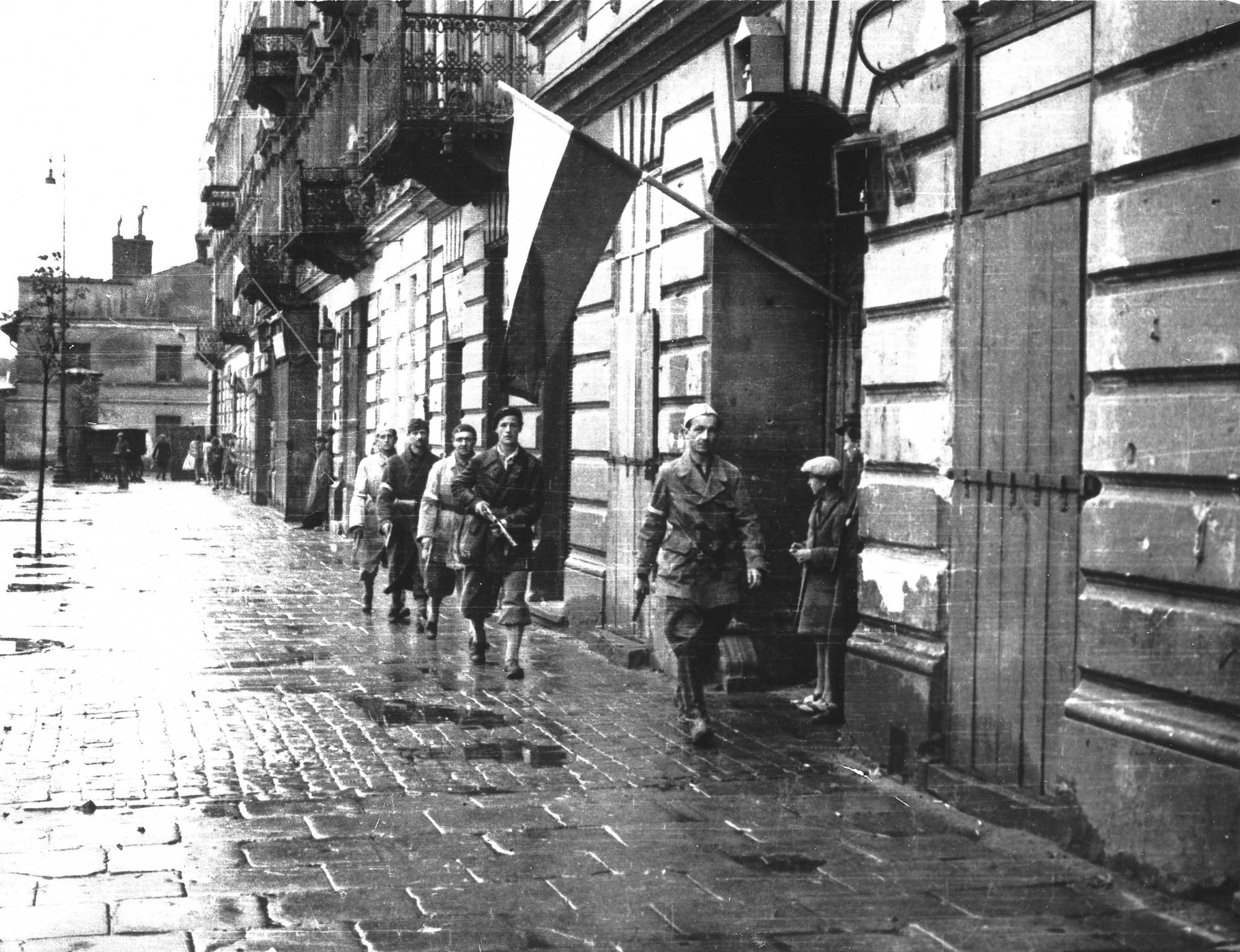
Lieutenant Agaton's patrol from the Pięść Battalion at Kazimierz Wielki Square en route to the city center, early August 1944

The Radosław Group (named after the pseudonym of its commander, Lieutenant Colonel Jan Mazurkiewicz) was the strongest and most elite group of the Home Army (AK) fighting in the Warsaw Uprising. It included relatively well-armed units experienced in clashes with the Germans, including the later-famous Grey Ranks battalions Zośka and Parasol.

In the uprising plans, the Radosław Group played a special role. It was intended to be a reserve exclusively at the disposal of the Home Army Headquarters, and also to provide direct protection to the leadership of the Polish Underground State – both against the Germans and upon the entry of Red Army units into the city. Since the Home Army command chose the Kamler Factory at 72 Dzielna Street in Wola as its headquarters, Kedyw received the order to secure its immediate vicinity. For this purpose, Lieutenant Colonel Radosław's units were to capture objects located in the eastern part of Wola – the area around Okopowa Street and the nearby religious cemeteries at Powązki. The specific tasks assigned to Kedyw units were the main reason why the fighting in Wola took on the character of unconnected actions by the Radosław Group and units of the Wola Subdistrict command in the first days of the uprising.

The deployment of the group before the "W" Hour took place under unfavorable circumstances. Due to the Home Army command's decision to shorten the mobilization time to 12 hours, only 40% of the soldiers reached the assembly points on time. The units were not fully armed, as some weapons did not arrive on time or were intercepted by German patrols (e.g., one of the transports of the Zośka Battalion was caught on Chłodna Street). Moreover, even before the "W" Hour, Radosław's soldiers became involved in unplanned skirmishes with the Germans. At 4:10 PM, a German car arrived at the Kamler Factory, where the Home Army Headquarters had already gathered, to collect uniforms stored there. A shootout ensued with the protective platoon of Lieutenant Jerzy Kamler, codenamed Stolarz, which alerted German posts stationed in the nearby Tobacco Monopoly factory. As a result, even before the uprising began, the Home Army Headquarters found itself under siege. Almost simultaneously, a chance firefight occurred with passing German cars near the Telefunken factory on Mirecki Street, where the assembly point of the Broda 53 Sabotage Brigade was located. This skirmish turned into a regular fight with the German police relief force, which arrived in three cars at Kercelego Square. Eventually, soldiers rushing to the assembly point from various units defeated the Germans and forced them to flee into the ghetto ruins. (Note: A dozen policemen burst into a house at 20 Okopowa Street, where they murdered several Polish men before they were apprehended (Borkiewicz (1969, p. 53)).) Only the German armored car participating in the fight managed to break through to Ulrychów.

Despite the aforementioned difficulties, the Radosław Group, as one of the few insurgent units, managed to capture most of the designated objectives on 1 August 1944. This was mainly due to the fact that German posts in the Okopowa Street area were relatively weak. As a result, the Zośka Battalion managed to capture the fortified barracks in the St. Kinga School at 55A Okopowa Street with minimal losses (32 prisoners were taken), and also secured the nearby Jewish cemetery and Pfeiffer's tannery at 58/72 Okopowa Street. Simultaneously, the Pięść Battalion occupied the Evangelical cemetery, and the Parasol Battalion the Calvinist cemetery. The unit of the Warsaw District Kedyw (the so-called Kolegium A) subordinated to Radosław, commanded by Lieutenant Stanisław Sosabowski, codenamed Stasinek, captured the large Waffen-SS warehouses at Stawki Street and the school at Niska Street (about 100 Hungarian Jews were freed there). (Note: Borkiewicz (1969, p. 69) and Przygoński (1980, p. 150) stated that Lieutenant Porawa's company from the Pięść Battalion also participated in the capture of the warehouses at Stawki Street and the school at Niska Street. However, this is not confirmed by the monograph on the Pięść Battalion authored by Bielecki & Kulesza (1996, pp. 300–314).) Meanwhile, after clashing with the German police at Kercelego Square, the Miotła Battalion secured the intersection of Okopowa and Żytnia streets, as well as the sections of Leszno and Wronia streets. Around 7:30 PM, an improvised unit composed of selected squads from Zośka, Miotła, and Parasol battalions also repelled the Germans from the Kamler Factory, thus freeing the leadership of the Polish Underground State from the siege. On the night between August 1 and 2, Radosław's soldiers additionally captured the Tobacco Monopoly buildings on Dzielna Street. The entire Okopowa Street – from Powązkowska Street to Kercelego Square – was under the control of the insurgents.

== Fighting in Wola ==
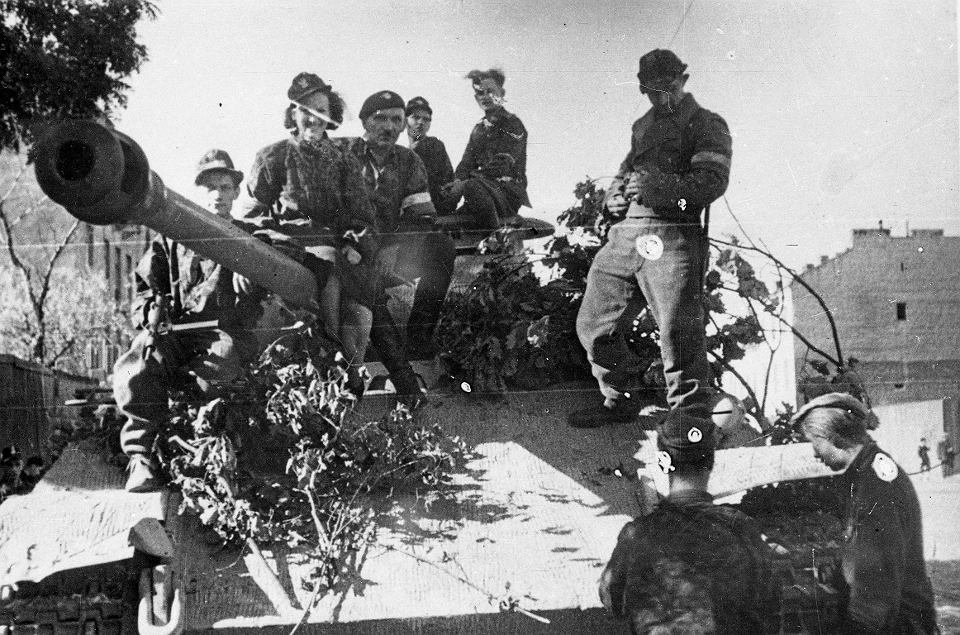
Captured Panther tank belonging to the Wacek Platoon

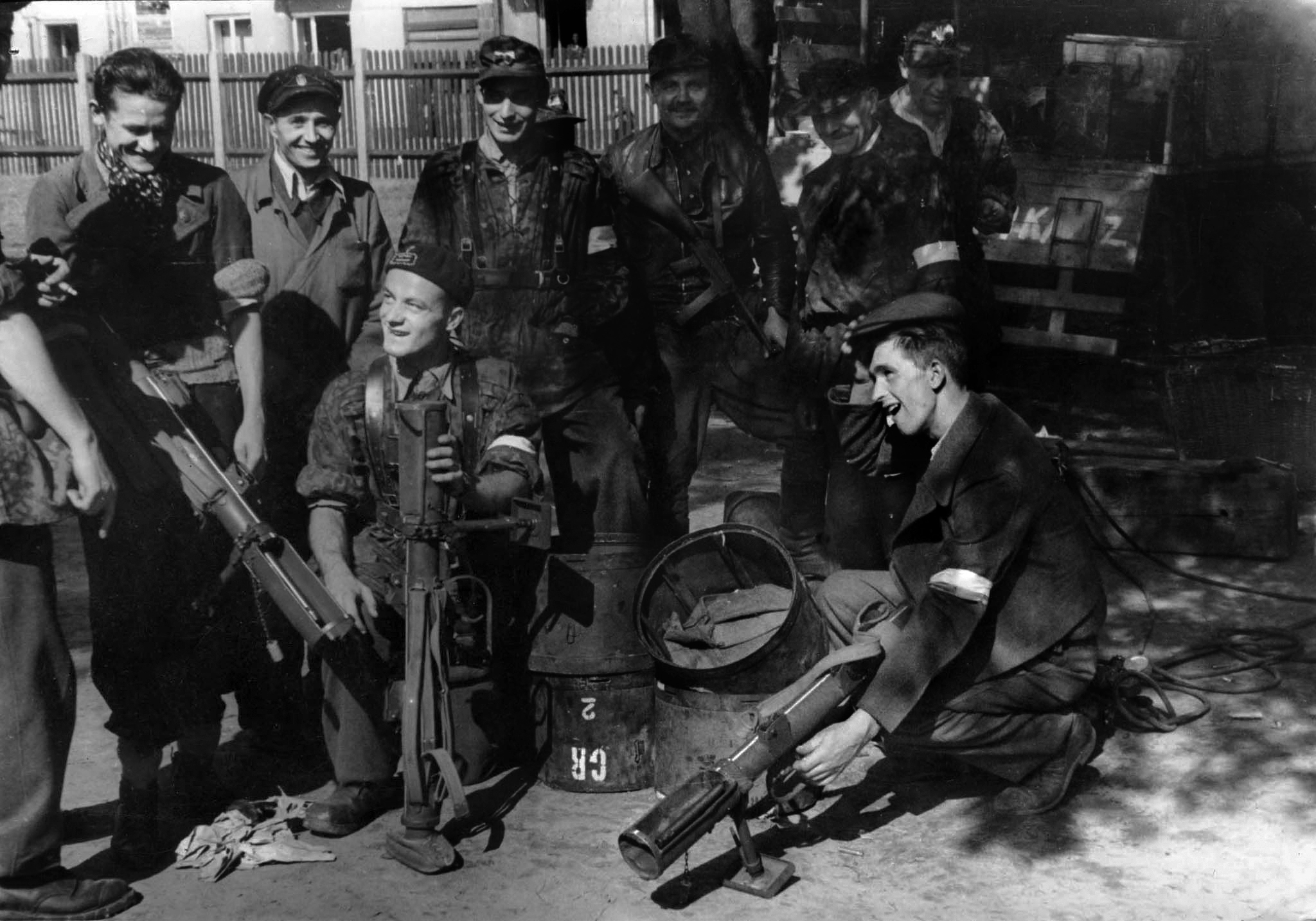
Soldiers from the Czata 49 Battalion retrieving PIAT grenades from containers dropped by Allied aircraft

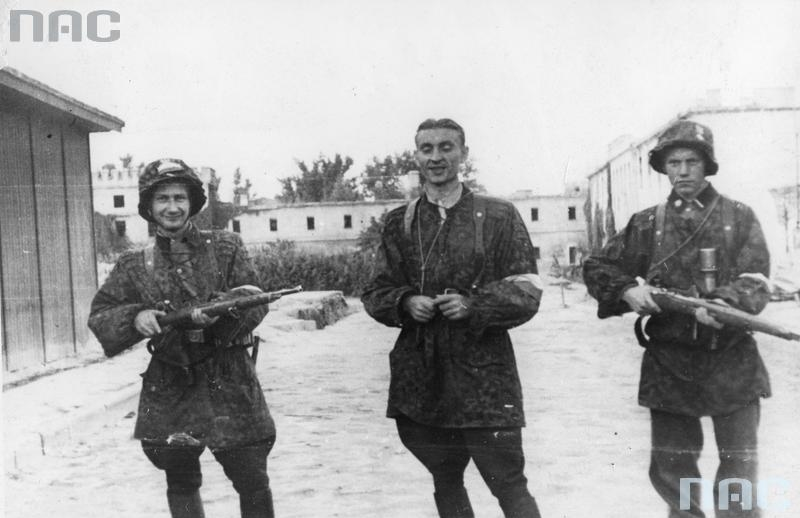
Soldiers from the Zośka Battalion on the grounds of the captured Gęsiówka

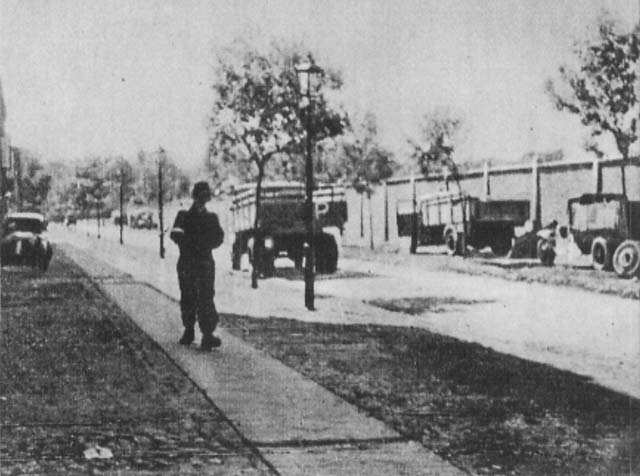
Captured motor pool of the Radosław Group in the vicinity of Mirecki Street. The wall surrounding the RKS Skra stadium is visible in the background

In other parts of Wola, the course of the battles was unfavorable for the Polish side. The units of the Wola Subdistrict failed to capture most of their designated objectives, leaving only the eastern part of the district under the control of the insurgents. The course of the fighting in Wola was particularly influenced by the fact that one of the city's most important thoroughfares, the Wolska–Chłodna–Elektoralna–Senatorska–Kierbedź Bridge route (known as the Wola artery), ran through the district from west to east. In the summer of 1944, this was one of the most critical supply routes on the central section of the eastern front, connecting German units on the right bank of the Vistula with their rear areas. At the end of July and beginning of August 1944, units of the elite 1st Fallschirm-Panzer Division Hermann Göring, transferred to Warsaw from the Italian front, were moving along this crucial artery. Elements of this division began unloading at the railway stations in Pruszków and Piastów around July 26, from where they were gradually transported to the right bank of the Vistula, taking part in the German counteroffensive on the outskirts of Praga. At the outbreak of the uprising in Wola, elements of the Hermann Göring Division, numbering about 1,000 soldiers and 20 tanks, were present, which contributed decisively to the failure of the Wola Subdistrict's offensive.

The few and poorly armed units of the Wola Subdistrict were almost immediately pushed onto the defensive. From August 2 to 4, elements of the Hermann Göring Division tried to force their way through the Wola artery. The enemy attacks primarily targeted the insurgent barricades in the area of Wolska and Górczewska streets, manned by soldiers of the Wola Subdistrict and supporting units of the People's Army (AL). Initially, the Radosław Group remained somewhat on the periphery of these struggles, with its actions not extending westward beyond the line of the Wola cemeteries. On August 2, small groups of German armored vehicles repeatedly penetrated Okopowa Street from the north, attempting to break through to the city center. Some of these were ambushed and the Zośka Battalion captured two German Panther tanks. (Note: The tanks were part of the 1st Battalion of the 27th Armored Regiment of the 19th Panzer Division, specifically its 3rd Company, which was temporarily subordinated to the Hermann Göring Division.) This success, combined with the earlier capture of a German truck with tank ammunition by soldiers from the Pięść Battalion, enabled the formation of an insurgent armored platoon under the command of Lieutenant Wacław Micuta, codenamed Wacek. Meanwhile, the Zośka Battalion soldiers also managed to capture the school on Spokojna Street, where they defeated a unit of Russian-speaking collaborators (the school henceforth became the main stronghold of the Polish defense on the northern flank of the Radosław Group). Around 2:00 PM, however, the Germans launched a strong attack along Okopowa Street, driving 50 Polish hostages tied to a ladder in front of their tanks. Kedyw soldiers managed to hold the barricade on Okopowa Street and the positions at Pfeiffer's tannery and the St. Kinga school, but the German tanks succeeded in breaking through to Śródmieście.

On August 3, the enemy did not display significant activity on Kedyw's sector. The Germans merely aimed to tie down Radosław's soldiers with mortar fire and the actions of individual tanks. After an unsuccessful attempt to break through to Kampinos, the Paweł Group (previously the reserve of the commander of the Warsaw District) subordinated itself to Lieutenant Colonel Radosław. On August 4, the Czata 49 and Parasol battalions suffered heavy losses due to enemy air raids. To aid the beleaguered People's Army and Wola Subdistrict units defending the Wola artery, Radosław sent his reserve under the command of Captain Mieczysław Kurkowski, codenamed Sawa. Meanwhile, nearly half of Radosław's forces were engaged in the ruins of the Warsaw Ghetto, where the enemy maintained strong positions separating Kedyw's positions from the Old Town (Pawiak, the Warsaw concentration camp on Gęsia Street, building No. 103, and St. Sophia's Hospital on Żelazna Street). Securing a direct connection with this district was at that time the most pressing issue occupying the attention of Lieutenant Colonel Radosław and his staff. An uncoordinated attack on German positions in the Żelazna Street area, conducted on August 4 by soldiers from the Zośka, Miotła, and Chrobry I battalions, ended in failure. On the night between August 4 and 5, Allied aircraft made supply drops over Wola, most of which fell into the hands of Radosław's soldiers.

Meanwhile, on August 4, the first units of the German "relief forces" designated to suppress the uprising appeared on the outskirts of Warsaw. German plans foresaw that the main focus of the attack would be on Wola, where an improvised police group from the Reichsgau Wartheland (commanded by SS-Gruppenführer Heinz Reinefarth), the SS-Sonderregiment Dirlewanger, as well as Azerbaijani collaboration units and a reserve battalion from the Hermann Göring Division, were to be deployed. Their objective was to liberate Governor Ludwig Fischer and General Reiner Stahel (cut off in the "government district" around Piłsudski Square) and to unblock the Wola artery. At the moment the German counterattack began (August 5), the Radosław Group occupied a vast area bounded by: to the south – Wolska and Chłodna streets; to the north – Spokojna Street and the adjacent Powązki Cemetery; to the west – Młynarska Street and the Calvinist, Evangelical, and Jewish cemeteries; to the east – the ruins of the Warsaw Ghetto. At that time, the group comprised about 1,650 soldiers, with 70% being armed. More specifically, Radosław's units were deployed as follows:

- The Czata 49 Battalion, along with Kolegium A, secured Kedyw's defense from the south, occupying the Gizów colony (the block between Leszno and Żytnia streets) along with the barricade at the intersection of Żytnia and Młynarska streets;
- The Parasol Battalion occupied the Calvinist cemetery and the barricade at the intersection of Żytnia and Młynarska streets;
- The Pięść Battalion occupied the Evangelical cemetery;
- The Paweł Group (the Wigry Battalion and the Antoni Battalion) defended the barricades at the intersections of Młynarska and Długosz streets and Ostroroga and Obozowa streets;
- The Broda 53 Diversion Brigade (without the Zośka Battalion) occupied the area of Okopowa Street (the St. Kinga School, the Telefunken factory), while also maintaining security on the Jewish and Catholic cemeteries;
- The Miotła and Zośka Battalions, along with the Wacek Platoon, were turned toward the ghetto ruins;
- The reserve Igor Battalion was stationed on Karolkowa Street, near the Evangelical cemetery;
- The 1806 Squadron (unarmed) secured the warehouses on Stawki Street.

On August 5, the Zośka Battalion, supported by two captured Panther tanks from Lieutenant Wacek's platoon, launched a fierce assault and captured the Warsaw concentration camp on Gęsia Street (Gęsiówka), where 348 Jews were liberated. This success allowed the Radosław Group to establish a direct connection with the Old Town. Simultaneously, the German counterattack unfolded in Wola. Reinefarth's and Dirlewanger's units stormed Polish barricades on Wolska and Górczewska streets from the early morning, brutally massacring Polish civilians in the process. From the Radosław Group, the 1st Company of the Parasol Battalion, led by Second Lieutenant Jerzy Zborowski (codenamed Jeremi), participated in these battles, notably defending the so-called Michler's Palace on Wolska Street. Initially, the enemy only conducted weak tying attacks on the main Kedyw sector. Although the Germans reached the line of Młynarska Street that day, they failed to dislodge the insurgents from their positions. Only the Czata 49 Battalion found itself in a difficult situation, as its positions were on the axis of Reinefarth's main attack. Despite significant losses, Czata soldiers managed to repel all enemy attacks.

In the afternoon, the Germans captured the main insurgent barricade at the intersection of Wolska and Młynarska streets and reached the intersection of Chłodna and Towarowa streets. Kedyw's southern flank found itself on the front line. Lieutenant Colonel Radosław was forced to reinforce it with part of his forces, namely the Miotła Battalion and the Maciek Company from the Zośka Battalion. In the afternoon, Radosław also decided to launch a counterattack from the Evangelical cemetery area, aimed at the flank of the German "relief forces" moving along Wolska Street. Initially, it was planned that the group's main forces would strike west towards the school on Gostyńska Street, then turn south – to the rear of Reinefarth's units. However, due to the progress of the German advance, Radosław decided to conduct another counterattack, along Młynarska and Karolkowa streets directly to the south. This second attack was to be carried out by Parasol and Zośka subunits, while the attack on the school on Gostyńska Street was to be carried out by the Pięść Battalion along with part of the Czata 49 Battalion. Kedyw's counterattack ended in failure. The attack by Pięść and Czata broke down under heavy enemy fire. Zośka and Parasol soldiers, on the other hand, clashed with a German assault moving along Karolkowa Street supported by armored vehicles, which pushed the Poles back to their starting positions. The only Polish success was slowing the enemy's advance and rescuing the Nałęcz Battalion (cut off in a house at 39 Wolska Street). That night, under enemy fire, the Karol and Maria Hospital on 136 Leszno Street was partially evacuated.

Ultimately, the Germans did not manage to unblock the Wolska artery that day, but the AL and AK "Wola" District units defending it were largely destroyed. The Radosław Group lost about 20 soldiers killed and 40 wounded, but it managed to hold the exit of Okopowa Street at Kercelego Square and the barricades at the intersections of Leszno with Karolkowa and Młynarska streets.

== Beginning of the battle for the cemeteries ==
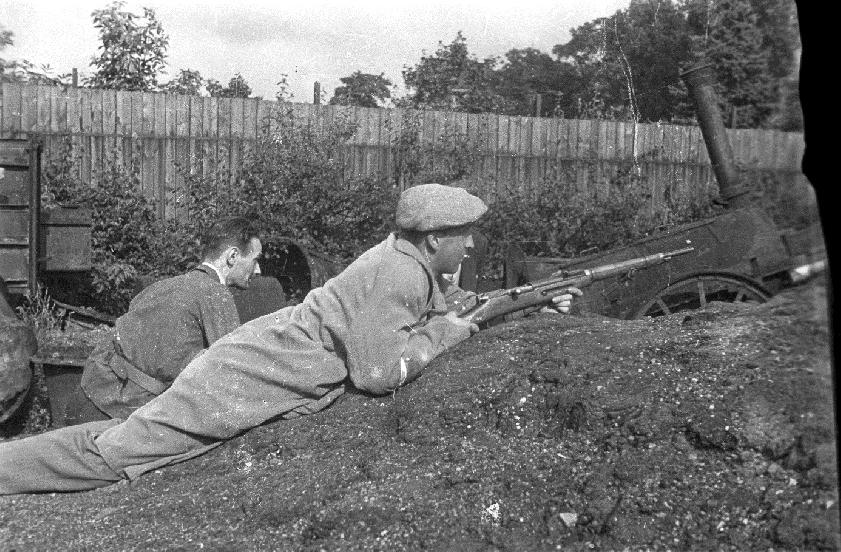
Soldiers of the Pięść Battalion in the Evangelical cemetery area

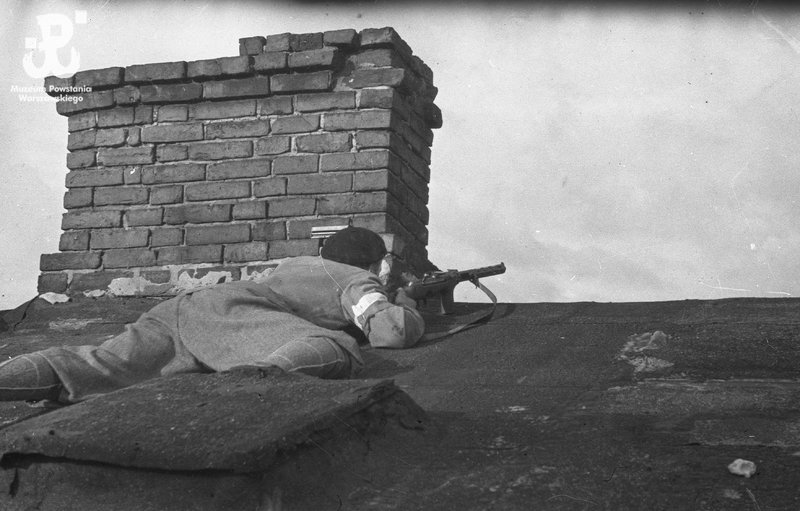
Insurgent lookout on the roof of the gravedigger's house at the Evangelical cemetery

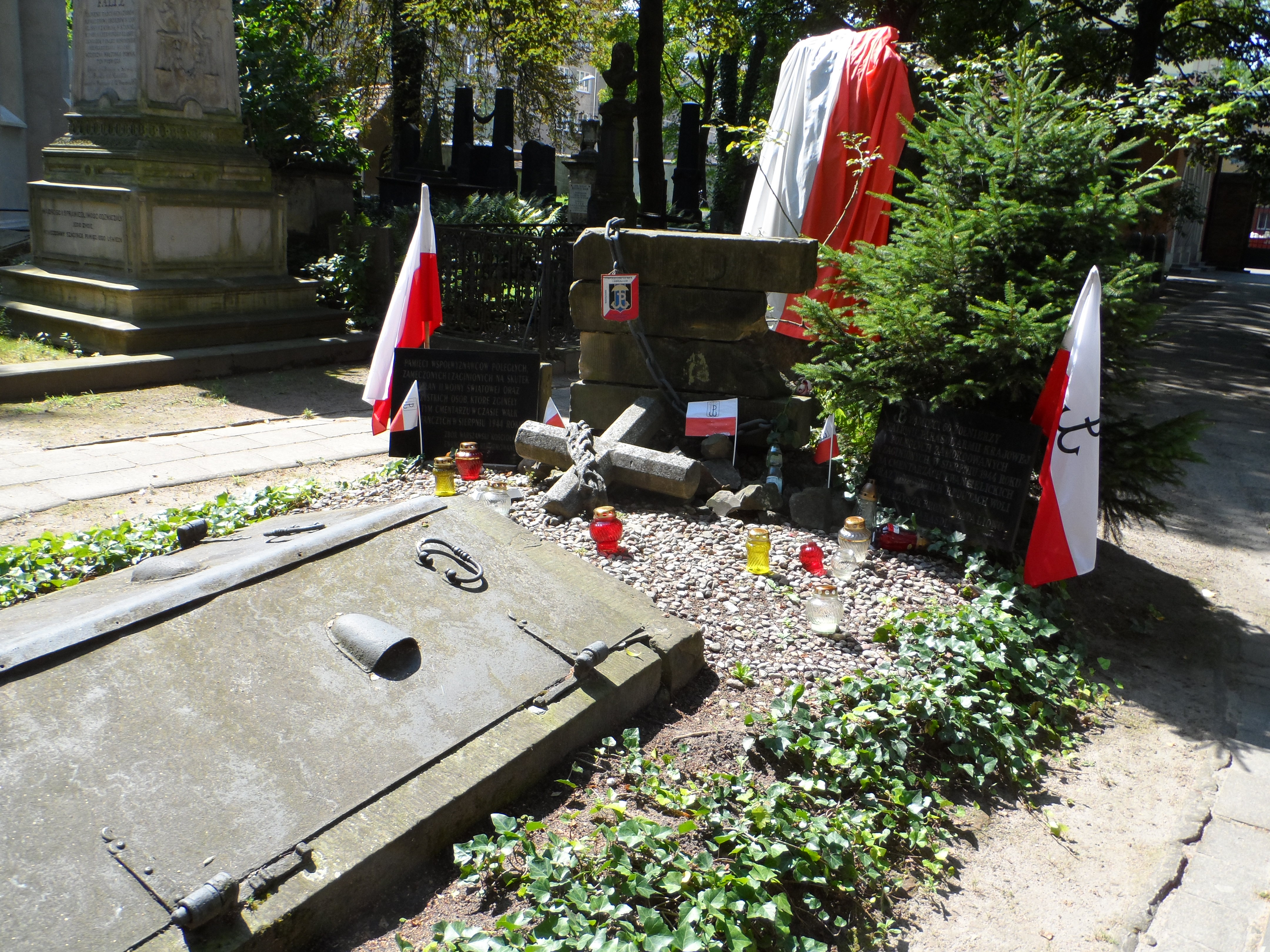
Tombstone in the Calvinist cemetery, commemorating the Parasol Battalion soldiers who died defending Wola

On the night between August 5 and 6, the Germans received substantial reinforcements. As a result, on the second day of the assault, German forces in Wola numbered over 6,000 soldiers (including Warsaw garrison units cut off in the Piłsudski Square area). Their actions were to be supported by 10 heavy tanks from the Hermann Göring Division, armored train No. 75, and aircraft from the 6th Air Fleet (Luftflotte 6). The course of the battles on August 5 made the German command realize that continuing the assault along the Wola artery could be very risky if a strong Kedyw group remained on the flank of Reinefarth's units. SS-Obergruppenführer Erich von dem Bach-Zelewski, newly appointed by Heinrich Himmler as the commander of German forces in Warsaw, therefore decided to engage Radosław's units with a concentric attack from two sides. On the western sector, the newly arrived 608th Guard Regiment (Note: The regiment had about 620 officers and soldiers. It was commanded by Colonel Willi Schmidt (Borkiewicz (1969, p. 128)).) was to launch a frontal assault on the cemeteries, while the police units from the Reichsgau Wartheland were tasked with tying up the Poles with an attack from the south, from the Wolska Street area. The Dirlewanger Regiment was to continue the assault along the Wola artery.

As reported by Adam Borkiewicz and other authors, on the night between August 5 and 6, Lieutenant Colonel Radosław also regrouped his units. The decimated Czata 49 Battalion was to leave its current positions in the Gizów colony and move to the Telefunken factory on Mirecki Street, where it would remain as a reserve. In its place, the group commander was to introduce a company from the Pięść Battalion (about 120 soldiers). (Note: The authors of the monograph of the Pięść Battalion, on the other hand, claimed that on August 6 the unit remained in reserve, and only entered combat at the end of the day (Bielecki & Kulesza (1996, pp. 335–337)).) That same night, a platoon from Pięść Battalion led by Lieutenant Stanisław Jankowski (codenamed Agaton) occupied the Kamler Factory on Dzielna Street, thus assuming the role of direct protection for the Home Army Main Command. The rest of the Kedyw units remained at their current positions.

On August 6, from the early hours, the cemeteries and the barricade at the intersection of Żytnia and Młynarska streets were shelled by German tanks, artillery, and the guns of armored train No. 75, moving along the perimeter railway line. The enemy fire soon forced the front-line subunits of the Parasol Battalion to retreat from the intersection to the cemetery grounds. Among those killed was courier Krystyna Wańkowicz (codenamed Anna) – the daughter of Melchior Wańkowicz. During an inspection of forward positions, the commander of the Parasol Battalion, Captain Adam Borys (codenamed Pług), was severely wounded (he was replaced by Second Lieutenant Jeremi). At 6:00 AM, the German police attacked Radosław's southern flank along the entire sector from Młynarska Street to Kercelego Square. Two and a half hours later, a frontal assault by the 608th Guard Regiment on the Calvinist cemetery began. The attack from the south was temporarily halted by the Poles along Żytnia Street. However, on the western sector, the Germans managed to penetrate the Calvinist cemetery. A counterattack by the Parasol Battalion momentarily stopped the enemy's advance there but failed to push the Germans out of the necropolis walls. During the cemetery fighting, the commander of the 2nd Company of Parasol, Officer Cadet Stanisław Jastrzębski (codenamed Kopeć), was seriously wounded. Meanwhile, German artillery fire broke through the wall of the adjacent Evangelical cemetery. Pressured heavily by the enemy, Parasol companies had to retreat deeper into the cemeteries and organize a defense within the maze of graves. With the looming threat of the Germans capturing the Wola artery, the Home Army Main Command, along with the Government Delegation for Poland and the close protection platoon, evacuated from Wola, setting up a new headquarters at the school on Barokowa Street in the Old Town. Following them, units of the Paweł Group also moved to the Old Town, and at night, the remnants of the People's Army units. Unarmed soldiers were dismissed from the ranks. These events severely weakened the cohesion of the Polish defense. By 4:00 PM, the Calvinist and Evangelical cemeteries were captured by the Germans, and their defenders were pushed back to Okopowa Street. Threatened with encirclement from the north, the Parasol and Pięść subunits were also forced to withdraw from Młynarska Street and the Gizów colony towards Okopowa Street. The enemy was satisfied with these successes and did not continue the assault towards the Jewish cemetery and Okopowa Street.

Radosław Group began preparations for a counterattack. The reserve Igor Battalion (composed of unarmed soldiers) was withdrawn to the camp on Gęsia Street, and the reserve Czata 49 Battalion was deployed to block Okopowa Street (at the level of the Evangelical cemetery), simultaneously feigning preparations for a counterattack. Meanwhile, the Broda 53 Brigade manned the Jewish cemetery. Its commander, Captain Jan Kajus Andrzejewski (codenamed Jan), fired signal rockets towards enemy positions in the neighboring Evangelical cemetery, causing German "Stuka" to mistakenly bomb their own troops. In the ensuing confusion, soldiers from the Zośka Battalion (platoons Sad and Alek), supported by tanks from the Wacek Platoon, launched an attack and between 6:05 PM and 7:05 PM, without any losses, recaptured both lost cemeteries and positions on Leszno and Żytnia streets. They captured a small amount of weapons, including a heavy machine gun. After a day of fighting, the Radosław Group occupied positions in a quadrilateral: from the west – Młynarska Street (Pięść and Parasol battalions); from the south – Żytnia and Leszno streets up to the barricade at the end of Okopowa Street at Kercelego Square (Czata 49 Battalion); from the east – Wronia and Wolność streets (Miotła Battalion), and from the north – the walls of the Jewish cemetery with a barricade at Sołtyk Street (Broda 53 Brigade). The reserve Igor Battalion along with unarmed soldiers from the Czata 49 and Miotła Battalions were sent to the camp on Gęsia Street.

On this day, however, the Germans managed to achieve a breakthrough on the main assault sector. The lead battalion of the Dirlewanger Regiment broke through to the German "government district" in the Piłsudski Square area, while the bloodied Home Army and People's Army units were pushed behind Żelazna Street. The Germans had not yet established a permanent connection with the "government district" because the section of Chłodna Street from Żelazna Street to Iron Gate Square remained a "no man's land". The situation for the Kedyw units became significantly complicated. However, the Radosław Group units still maintained contact with Major Sosna's unit manning the courthouse on Leszno, and through Gęsia Street, the ruins of the ghetto, and Stawki – with the defenders of the Old Town. Some ruins of the ghetto, from Pawiak to the St. Sophia Hospital at the intersection of Żelazna and Żytnia streets, were still held by German forces.

On August 7, the Germans finally secured the Wola artery up to the Saxon Garden. Major Sosna's group defending the courthouse on Leszno was pushed to Muranów. Meanwhile, the isolated Radosław Group had to face another German assault. From the early morning hours, the cemetery area was shelled by German artillery and bombed by aircraft. Small enemy units supported by armored weapons attacked Kedyw's southern flank along Okopowa and Karolkowa streets. The Germans managed to push the 2nd Company of Parasol from the gardens of the Karol and Maria Hospital and the barricade at the intersection of Żytnia and Młynarska streets, forcing it to retreat towards the Calvinist cemetery. Further assault was halted at the barricades at the intersections of Żytnia with Okopowa and Karolkowa streets. The insurgents managed to damage a German tank and an armored car there. The Germans also attacked from the front – on the Jewish cemetery, skirmishes occurred at very close range. German tanks were breaking down the cemetery walls with artillery fire. Around 2:00 PM, nearly 20 German Heinkel He 111 bombers started an air raid on the Calvinist cemetery. To avoid losses, Second Lieutenant Jeremi withdrew the soldiers of the 1st and 3rd companies of Parasol from the cemetery, while the 2nd Company began regrouping, moving forward positions towards the cemetery. The necropolis became a "no man's land" for a while, but before Jeremi could reoccupy it, a German infantry assault supported by two tanks occurred (at 5:00 PM). The Calvinist cemetery fell into enemy hands. Around 6:20 PM, the soldiers of Parasol, supported by Zośka platoons and captured tanks from the Wacek Platoon, launched a counterattack. After a short but fierce fight, the Poles regained the necropolis. The Germans lost one tank, destroyed by a precise shot from an insurgent Panther tank. However, the lost Gizów colony was not recaptured, as Lieutenant Colonel Radosław, due to the Home Army units' retreat from Leszno, was forced to withdraw the southern flank of his group to the Żytnia Street line.

== Concept of evacuation to Kampinos ==
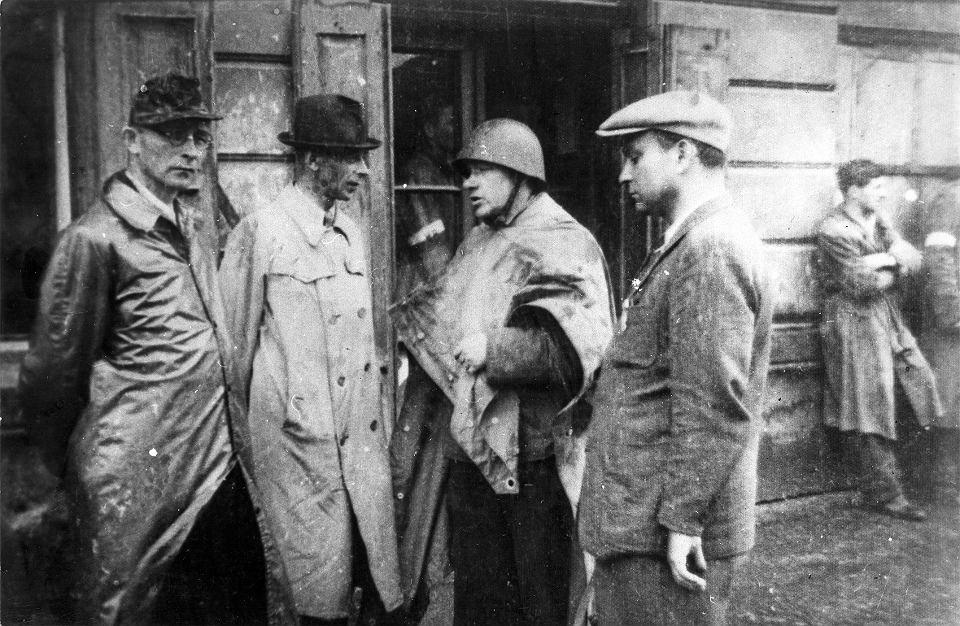
General Bór (second from the left) and Lieutenant Colonel Radosław (in helmet) at a briefing near the Kamler Factory

As a result of the fierce fighting between August 5 and 7, the strength of the Radosław Group dwindled to about 1,000 soldiers. Ammunition shortages were becoming apparent. At the same time, the loss of the Wola artery put Kedyw in a very difficult tactical situation. The Radosław Group was cut off from the city center and, from August 7, it essentially fought in isolation. Although contact with the Old Town was still maintained, the presence of strong enemy outposts in the ghetto ruins and the growing activity of the Germans on Kedyw's previously calm northern flank made the group's command seriously consider the threat of imminent encirclement. Despite this, Radosław Group units defended the cemetery area for 4 more days. This turn of events was the result of Radosław's concept of evacuating to the Kampinos Forest. As early as August 5, the Kedyw commander had concluded that continuing the fight in Warsaw would doom his elite group, composed of experienced sabotage soldiers and select young scouts, to senseless destruction. Radosław demanded that Kedyw be spared the exhausting street fights and withdrawn through Powązki to nearby Kampinos. There, the group would join the Home Army forest units of the Kampinos Group and, after receiving Allied airdrops of weapons and ammunition, could effectively harass the rear of the German units fighting in Warsaw.

Meanwhile, on August 7, the Radosław Group – previously directly subordinate to the Home Army Headquarters – was organizationally subordinated to the so-called Północ Group forming in the Old Town. (Note: In addition to Kedyw, it included Home Army units fighting in the Old Town, Żoliborz and the Kampinos Forest.) Its commander, Lieutenant Colonel Karol Ziemski, codenamed Wachnowski, firmly opposed Radosław's intentions, fearing that Kedyw's retreat to Kampinos would expose the still-forming defense of the Old Town to a German attack. Wachnowski was convinced that positions in the Wola cemetery area and the ghetto ruins were untenable. For this reason, he expected Radosław to leave only weak security at the exposed position in the Okopowa Street area, while the main forces would withdraw to Muranów. In his vision, this estate was to serve as an advanced bastion of Old Town defense – shielding the most vulnerable flank of the Północ Group (the western one) from attack, while also serving as a staging base for offensive actions towards Żoliborz. The Home Army Headquarters also did not approve of the group's evacuation to Kampinos. According to Captain Pług's account, the Kedyw commander was told in response to his proposals that carrying out the plan would doom the uprising.

Radosław, however, did not intend to abandon his concept and prolonged the fight in the Powązki area, hoping to persuade the Home Army command to approve the group's evacuation to Kampinos. Additionally, both the Home Army Headquarters and Wachnowski temporarily allowed him to continue the fight in the Powązki area, mistakenly assuming that Home Army units from the Kampinos Forest would conduct a relieving attack on the German flank in this area on the night between August 8 and 9.

Radosław organized his units in such a way that they could continue defending the cemeteries while being ready for an immediate march out of the city. The Czata 49 Battalion, consisting of 120 soldiers, was positioned facing the Warszawa Gdańska railway station with the aim of breaking through to Kampinos.

Grzegorz Jasiński proposed a completely different explanation for Lieutenant Colonel Radosław's actions from August 7 to 9. Based on preserved reports of the Radosław Group, he concluded that the maneuvers of the Polish units towards the railway line were not driven by the desire to retreat to the Kampinos Forest, but by the goal of breaking through the German barrier separating the Old Town from Żoliborz, which in this case would align with Lieutenant Colonel Wachnowski's intentions.

== Fighting from August 8 to 10 ==
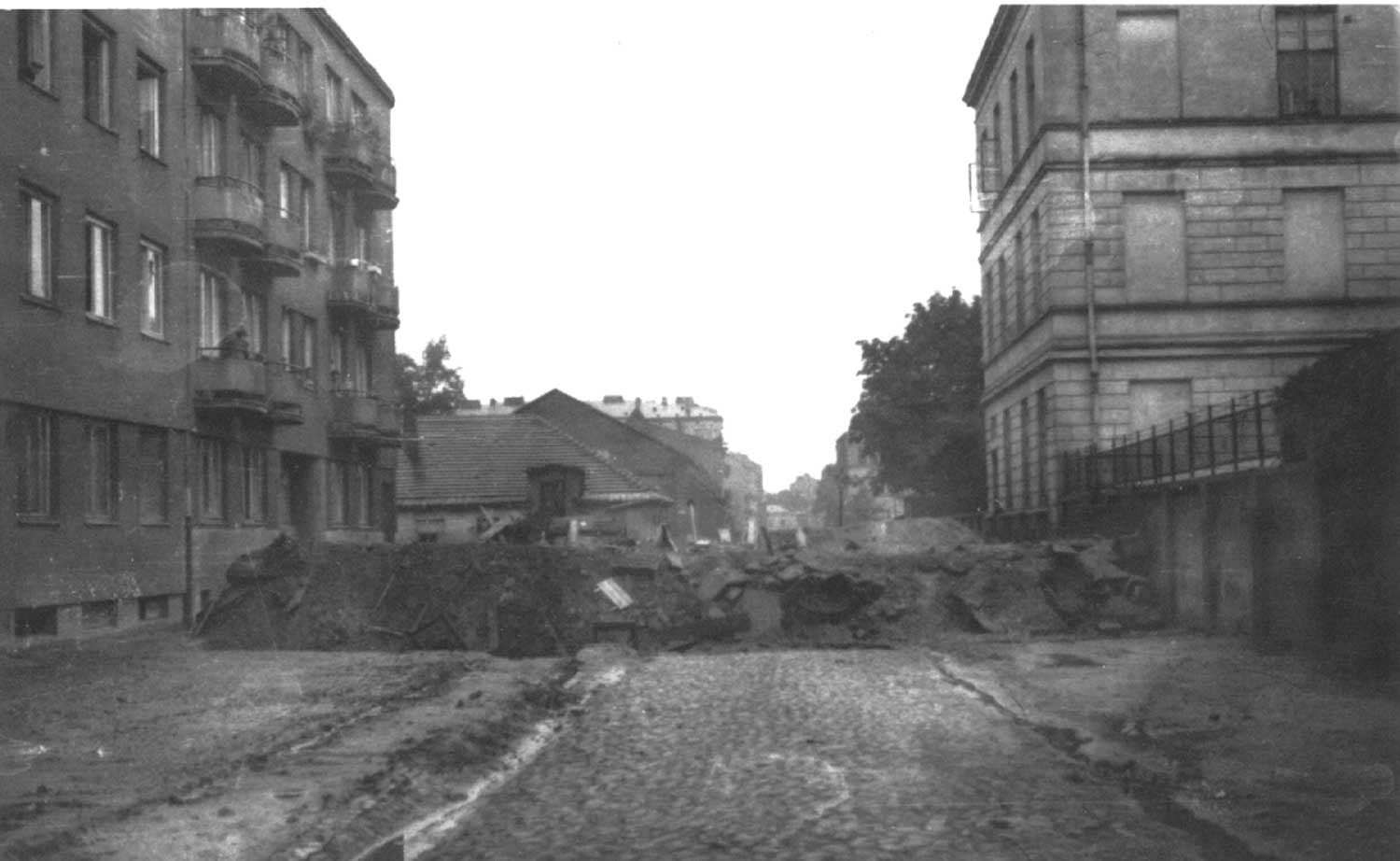
Insurgent barricade at the intersection of Żytnia and Karolkowa streets

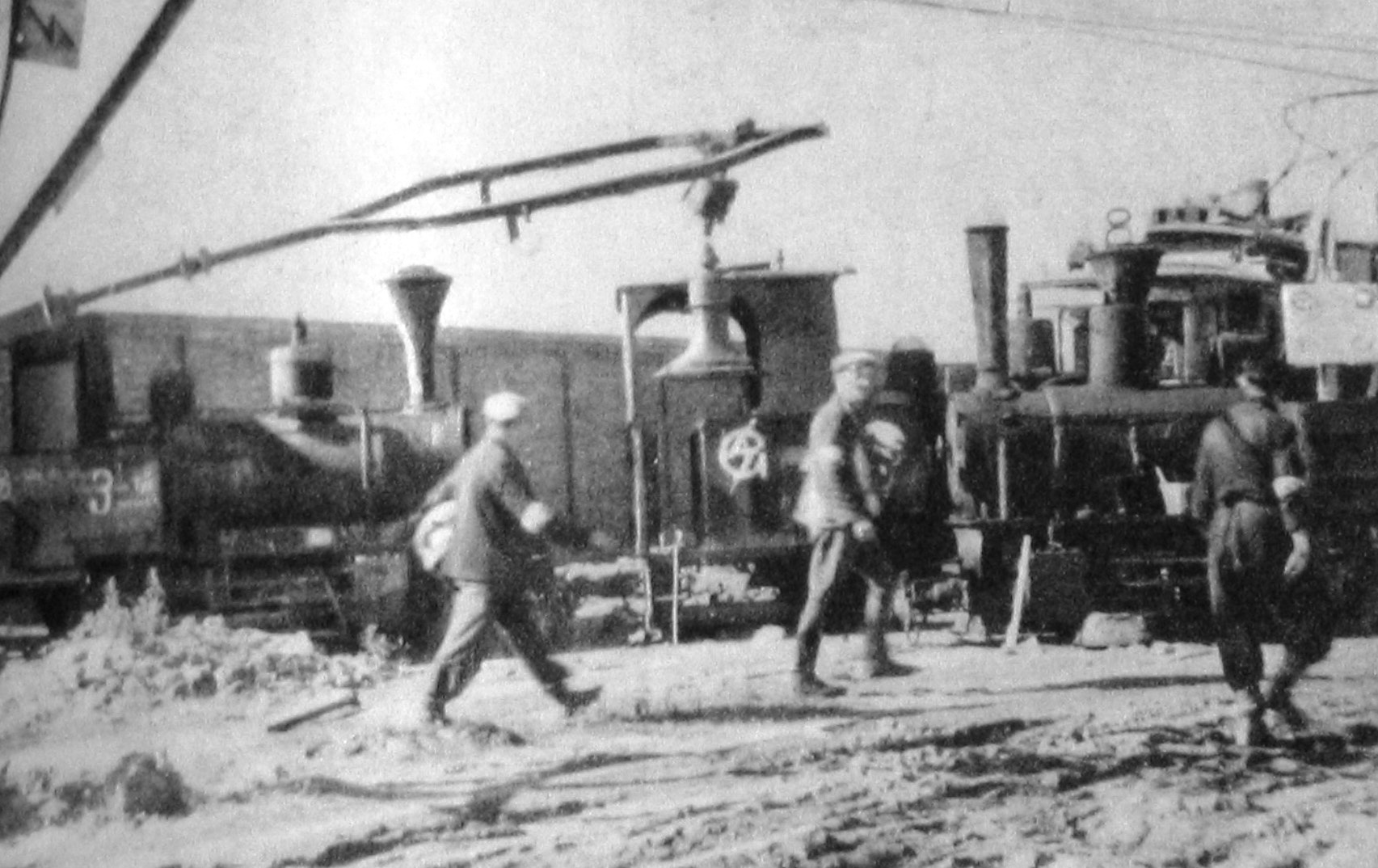
Insurgent barricade on Okopowa Street

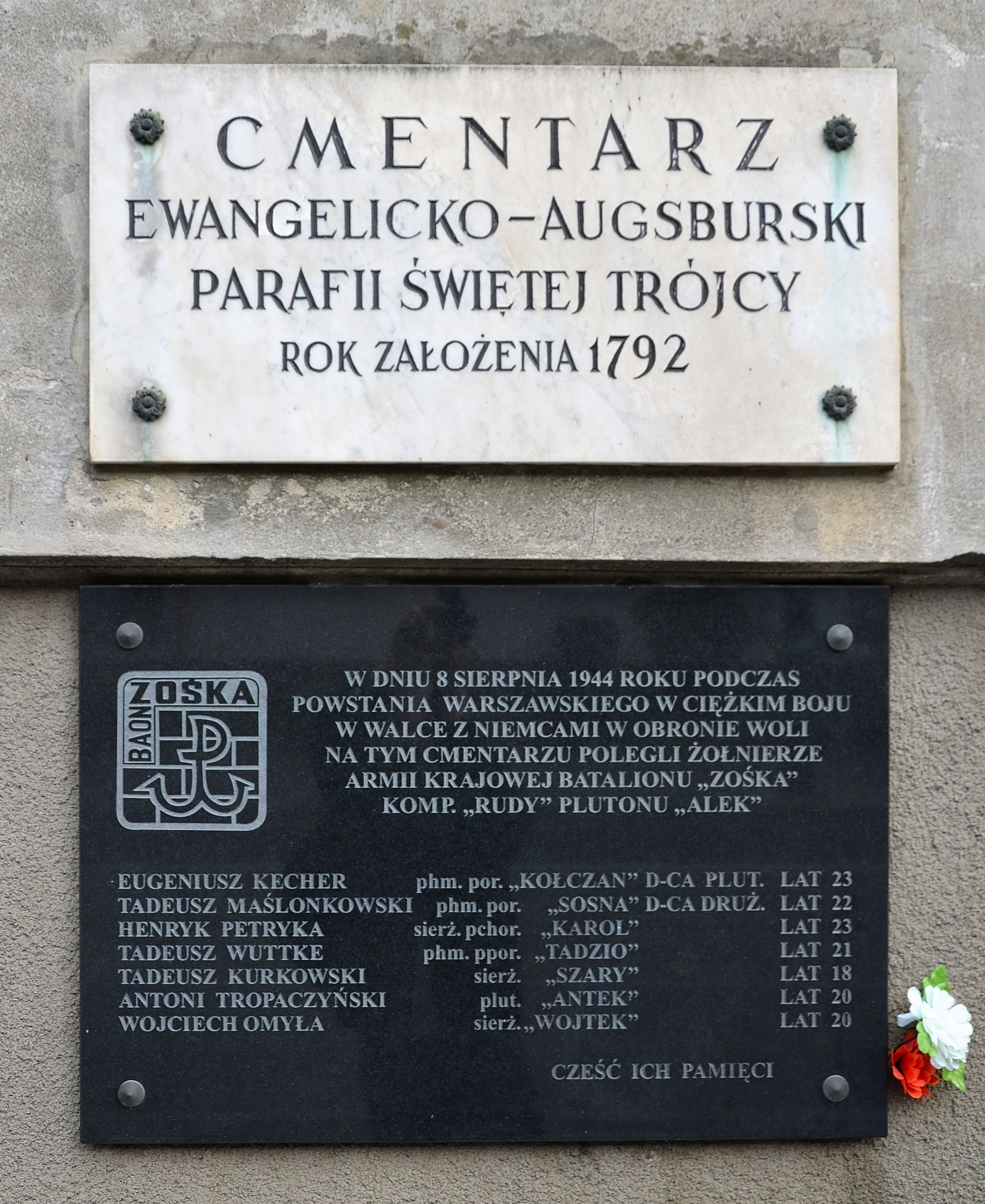
Plaque commemorating Zośka Battalion soldiers who died in battles at the Evangelical cemetery

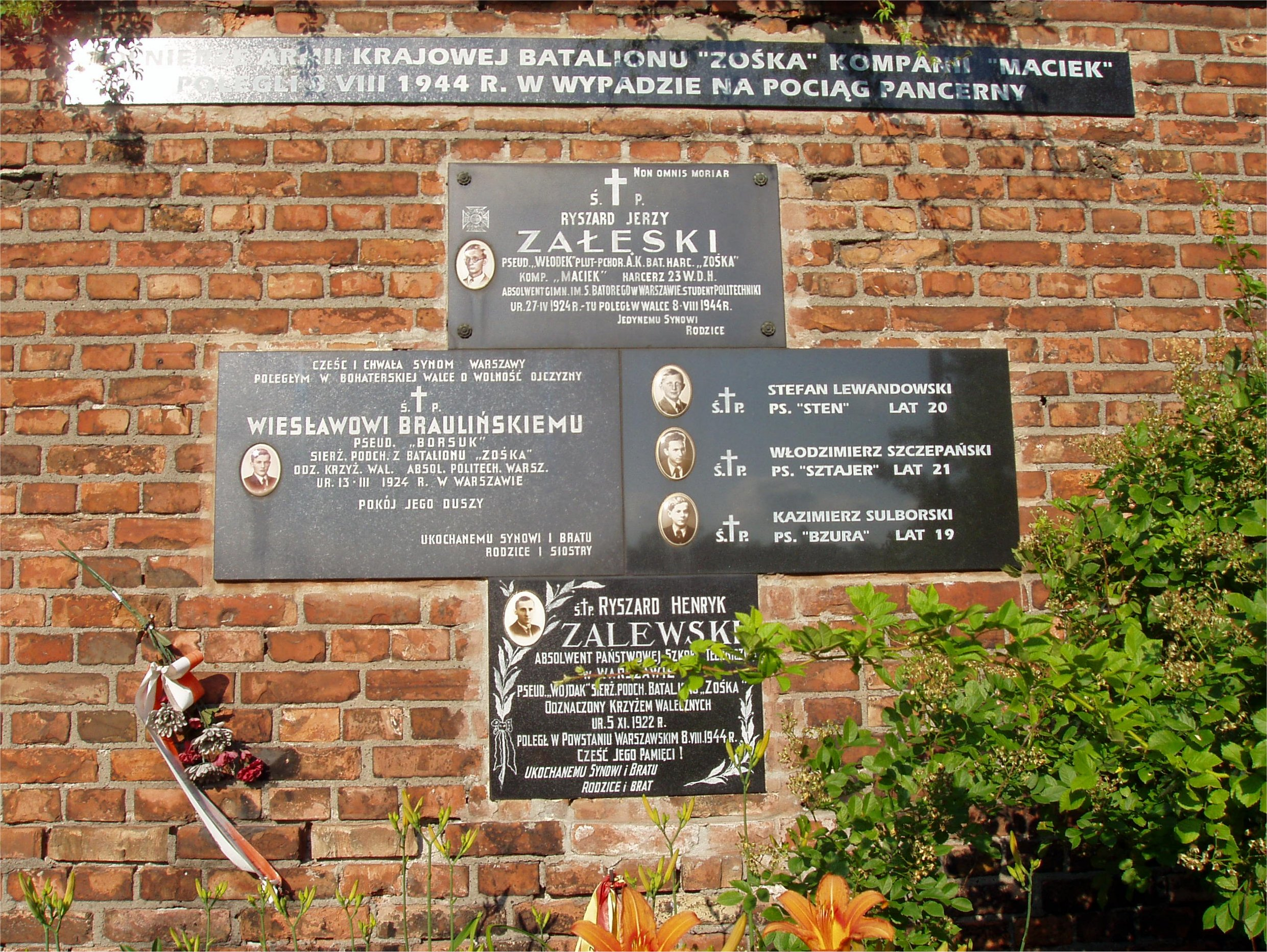
Plaques commemorating Zośka Battalion soldiers who died during the raid on the German armored train

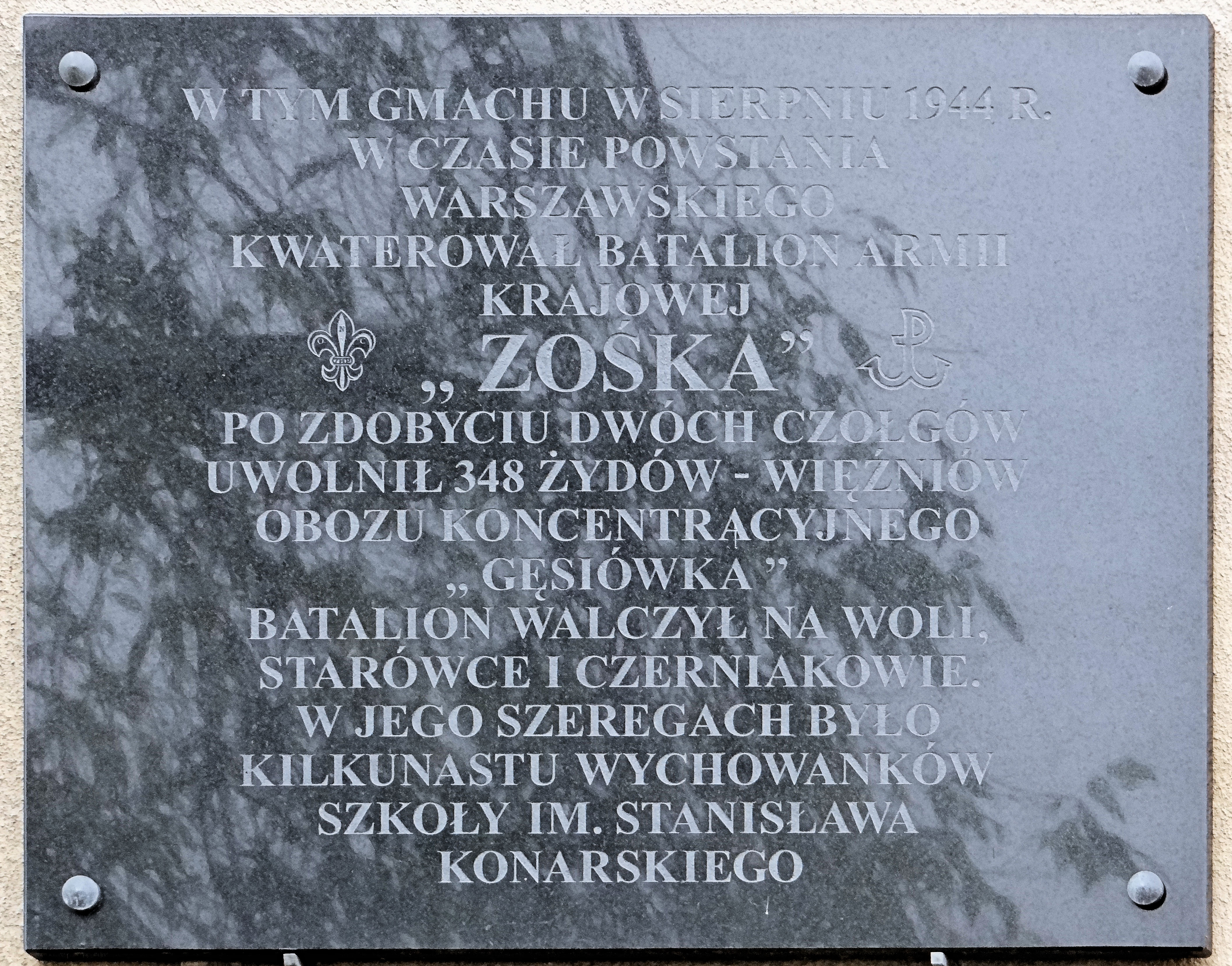
Plaque commemorating the defenders of the "fortress" at 55A Okopowa Street

On the night between August 7 and 8, the Radosław Group was deployed as follows:

- The Zośka Battalion manned the Jewish cemetery and part of the Evangelical cemetery;
- The Parasol Battalion manned the Calvinist cemetery and part of the Evangelical cemetery;
- The Broda 53 Brigade (excluding Zośka) stationed in the area of St. Kinga's School on Okopowa Street;
- The Pięść Battalion manned the southern flank of Kedyw (the intersections of Żytnia Street with Karolkowa and Okopowa streets); (Note: Part of the battalion, along with its commander, Major Alfons Kotowski, codenamed Okoń, moved to Muranów (Kirchmayer (1984, p. 288)).)
- The Miotła Battalion manned Pfeiffer's tannery on Okopowa Street, while also maintaining positions on Wolność Street and in the Tobacco Monopoly building on Dzielna Street;
- The Czata 49 Battalion remained as a reserve in the Telefunken factory on Mireckiego Street;
- The reserve Igor Battalion still manned the camp on Gęsia Street, and the 1806 Squadron, reinforced by a Kedyw team, manned the warehouses on Stawki Street.

On the night between August 7 and 8, an attempt was made to disable the German armoured train, whose artillery was severely affecting the cemetery defenders. A 20-man raid group was formed from the Zośka Battalion, led by Sergeant Cadet Andrzej Sowiński, codenamed Zagłoba. Due to inaccurate reconnaissance, the unit stumbled upon a camouflaged German position near the tracks. Six Polish soldiers died, and several others, including Zagłoba, were wounded. The train could still move along the railway line unimpeded.

On the morning of August 8, the Germans launched another assault on Kedyw's positions. That day, the Radosław Group was attacked from nearly all sides. At 8:00 AM, units of the Kalmyks (Note: The residents of the capital collectively referred to the collaborators pacifying Warsaw from the eastern volunteer formations as Ukrainians or Kalmyks, and these terms appear most frequently in the recollections. In this case, it is most likely referring to soldiers of the Eastern Turkestan Waffen-SS Combat Union or soldiers from one of the Azerbaijani battalions (Borkiewicz (1969, p. 144)).) and police from Wartheland, supported by tanks, struck the Polish barricades at the corners of Żytnia and Karolkowa streets and Żytnia and Okopowa streets. Fierce fighting occurred, especially for the Evangelical Old People's Home building at the intersection of Żytnia and Karolkowa streets. On Karolkowa Street, the enemy drove a "human shield" of Polish civilians captured in Wola before them. Around 9:00 AM, the 608th Security Regiment began a frontal assault on the cemeteries from the west. The Pawiak crew also engaged in actions behind Kedyw's lines. Okopowa Street and insurgent positions in the ruins of the ghetto came under heavy fire from German machine guns stationed on the towers of Pawiak, St. Augustine's Church, and St. Charles Borromeo's Church. The all-day battle was fierce. On the southern section, the Parasol and Pięść battalions twice repelled attacks by the German police, halting them on Żytnia Street and the edge of the Calvinist cemetery (10:00 AM and 12:00 PM). (Note: In the situation report No. 2 from the commander of Północ Group on 8 August 1944 (6:00 PM), it was reported that the Germans began their assault on the southern flank of Radosław Group as early as 6:00 AM. Within three hours, the Poles had repelled four enemy attacks. Then, at 11:30 AM, another attack was repelled in the area of Karolkowa Street, and at 11:45 AM, an assault on the Evangelical cemetery was also repelled (Stachiewicz (1983, pp. 61–62); Przygoński (1980, p. 408)).) In some places, hand-to-hand combat occurred. Despite fierce defense and a counterattack, Polish soldiers were ultimately driven from the Calvinist cemetery. In the east, a weak attack by the Pawiak crew was easily repelled, but enemy sniper and machine gun fire caused significant losses in Polish units. The unarmed 1806 Squadron had to withdraw from the Stawki warehouses to Spokojna Street. On the western section, after hours of fighting, the Germans managed to capture the Evangelical cemetery and push the defenders into the Mirecki Street area (around 7:00 PM). Among the fallen was Lieutenant Eugeniusz Koecher, codenamed Kołczan – commander of the Alek Platoon in the Zośka Battalion. One of the captured tanks from the Wacek Platoon was immobilized due to damage. The situation for the Radosław Group became critical, as an hour earlier, the Germans, reinforced by a reserve Wehrmacht battalion, broke through Polish defenses on Żytnia Street and pushed the Pięść and Parasol platoons into the Mirecki Street area. German assault groups Schmidt and Reck, attacking from the west and south, established direct contact. Radosław was forced to withdraw the bloodied Pięść Battalion to the Old Town. The situation was saved by a daring counterattack by the Zośka Battalion from the Jewish cemetery on the flank of the German assault. After hand-to-hand combat with German infantry and a clash with tanks at the intersection of Sołtyka and Młynarska streets, Polish soldiers recaptured the Evangelical cemetery (7:45 PM). During the counterattack, the insurgents captured 6 machine guns, a mortar, dozens of rifles, and a large amount of ammunition (the Radosław Group's diary reported: Captured 2 heavy machine guns, 1 light machine gun, and 1 mortar). Both sides suffered significant losses. At the same time, on the southern section, the Parasol Battalion managed to stop the enemy's assault along the Mirecki Street line.

The course of the fighting on August 8 was unfavorable for the Polish side. The Calvinist cemetery was lost, and Kedyw's southern flank was pushed from Żytnia Street to the Mireckiego Street area. Radosław's forces dwindled to about 800 soldiers. In this situation, the Kedyw commander decided to break through to Kampinos Forest. Without consulting Lieutenant Colonel Wachnowski (his formal superior), he informed the Home Army Headquarters of the plan to march and began preparations for evacuation without waiting for approval. Kedyw units began concentrating in the camp on Gęsia Street, and the Czata 49 unit, previously transferred to Stawki, set off towards Kampinos just before midnight (tasked with leading the way). Meanwhile, Lieutenant Colonel Wachnowski arrived at Radosław's command post and, authorized by the Home Army Headquarters, gave the Kedyw commander an oral order to stay in their current positions. Evacuation preparations were halted. Radosław's units now took positions limited from the south by the line: Evangelical cemetery–Mireckiego Street–Dzielna Street. The Miotła Battalion manned Pfeiffer's factory with positions in the Tobacco Monopoly and on Gęsiówka. The 1st Company of Parasol, together with Miotła subunits, manned the intersection of Okopowa and Mireckiego streets (including the Telefunken factory), and the 3rd Company held the Evangelical cemetery. The Zośka Battalion defended the fortress at 55A Okopowa Street, the Jewish cemetery, and the school at 13 Spokojna Street. Captain Mieczysław Kurkowski's, codenamed Sawa, detachment manned Temler's tannery, closing off the northern exit of Okopowa Street. Czata 49 remained at Stawki.

On August 9, German artillery and aviation shelled Polish positions from morning. Numerous patrol skirmishes took place at the Evangelical cemetery. Due to a lack of ammunition and the Germans' stiff defense, the insurgent attack on the Evangelical Old People's Homes failed. Around 4:00 PM, German infantry supported by tanks and artillery began an assault on the Evangelical cemetery from two sides. The Germans broke into the necropolis, but Parasol soldiers briefly halted them at the Halpert, Jung, and Wedel chapels. The fighting was fierce over every alley and tomb. After 3 hours, Parasol was driven from the cemetery. German patrols began infiltrating the Jewish cemetery, directly threatening Spokojna, Okopowa, and Stawki streets. The exhausted Parasol was withdrawn to the Old Town, where it went into reserve for the Północ Group. (Note: During the fights in defense of the Wola cemeteries, Parasol Battalion lost nearly 40% of its original manpower (Stachiewicz (1984, p. 526)).) Zośka, introduced in its place, managed to retake the Evangelical cemetery by the end of the day. Meanwhile, skirmishes also occurred around the Jewish cemetery and the school on Spokojna Street. Miotła repelled an attack by Germans from the Pawiak crew. The retreat of Parasol, combined with the earlier withdrawal of Pięść and the transfer of Czata 49 to Stawki, meant that only units of the Broda 53 Brigade (including the Zośka Battalion) and the Miotła Battalion remained in the cemetery area. The defenders' forces numbered only between 600 and 700 soldiers. Radosław again asked for permission to evacuate his units to Kampinos. In preparation, Major Tadeusz Runge, codenamed Witold, commander of Czata 49, moved his unit to Stawki on the morning of August 9 and ordered the soldiers to prepare for the journey by gathering backpacks, food, and ammunition. However, on August 10, Colonel Wachnowski arrived at Stawki and categorically forbade leaving Warsaw. Despite the opposition from the commander of the Północ Group, the Home Army High Command allowed Radosław to continue fighting in the Okopowa Street area. On the night between August 9 and 10, another attempt was made to disable the armored train. This time, they aimed to blow up the railway tracks, but the Germans were prepared, and the attempt failed.

On August 10, the Germans conducted several reconnaissance attacks in the Okopowa Street area. The German assault that began at 5:00 AM on the southern sector pushed the Zośka and Miotła units from their positions at the Evangelical cemetery and Mireckiego Street. The Germans captured the Telefunken factory building. The Włodek Platoon from the Zośka Battalion, fighting in the Skra soccer field area, suffered heavy losses, including the death of their commander, Second Lieutenant Jerzy Golnik, codenamed Tyka. The German assault was stopped only around the corner of Okopowa and Dzielna streets. The ghetto area was shelled by the armored train's artillery throughout the day. German attacks also targeted the vicinity of the Catholic cemetery, indicating the enemy was starting to threaten the northern sector of the Polish defense for the first time. At 6:30 AM, the Germans, driving a group of Polish hostages ahead of them, attacked Temler's tannery on Okopowa Street. Home Army soldiers opened the factory gates, letting the women inside, and then bombarded the enemy with heavy fire. After a two-hour battle, the Germans retreated. After 8:00 AM, an attack on the school on Spokojna Street, defended by the Felek Platoon from the Zośka Battalion, began. Simultaneously, three German tanks and an armored car tried to penetrate Okopowa Street. The attacks were repelled by Zośka and Miotła soldiers. The last captured Panther tank destroyed the armored car and damaged one of the tanks with precise fire. A well-aimed shot from the insurgent tank also destroyed a German position on the tower of the St. Charles Borromeo's Church. In the evening, Zośka soldiers repelled another German attack on the Jewish cemetery. At night, Captain Tomasz Wierzejski, codenamed Zgoda, successfully dispersed a 30-man German outpost at the corner of Burakowska and Piaskowa streets.

The combat diary of the German 9th Army recorded on August 10 that their assault groups were advancing slowly in Warsaw. The insurgents were reinforcing their strongpoints with barricades. The combat group deployed from the northwest captured the Jewish and Evangelical cemeteries. Meanwhile, Combat Group Reinefarth received additional reinforcements, including the 302nd Tank Battalion, equipped with 50 Goliath tracked mines.

== Retreat to the Old Town ==
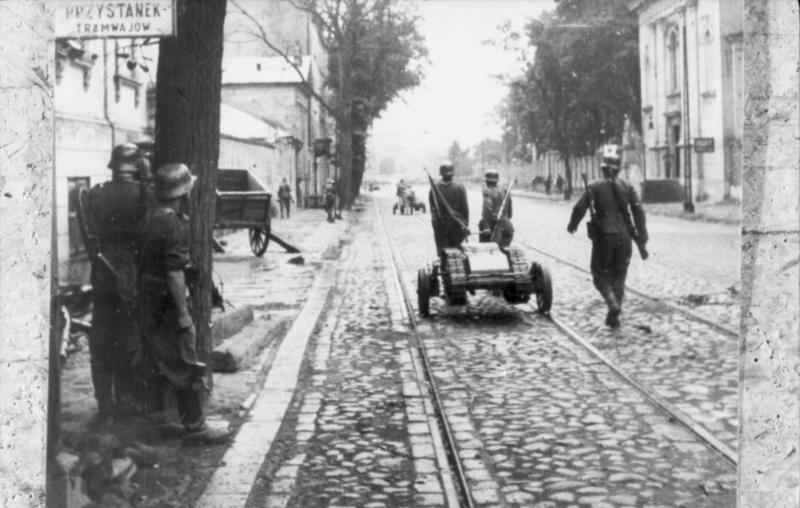
German soldiers dragging a Goliath tracked mine along Powązkowska Street

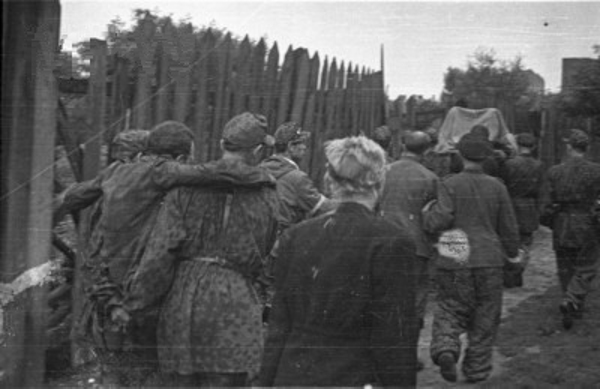
Evacuation of wounded soldiers from the Pięść Battalion near the Evangelical cemetery

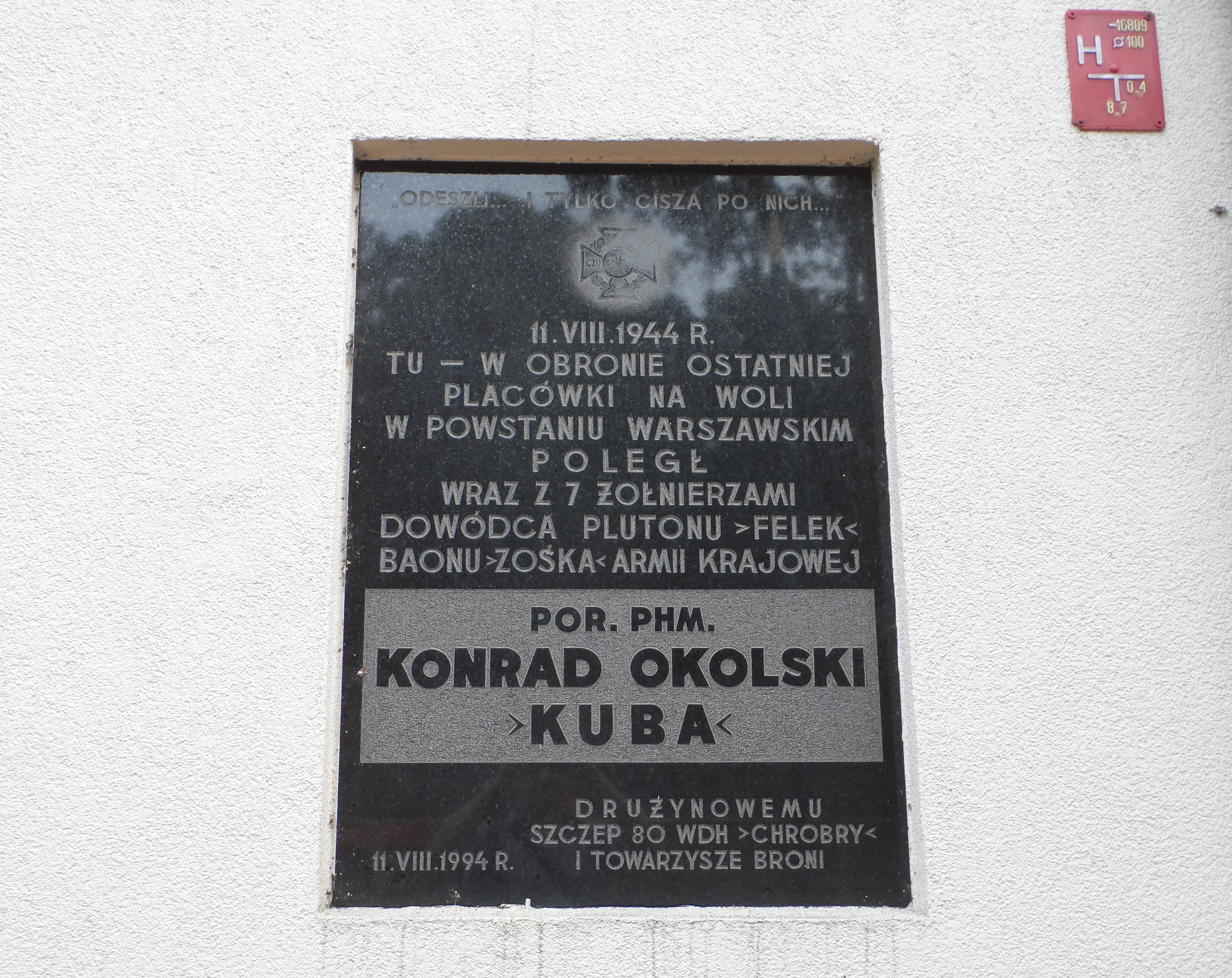
Plaque at 13 Spokojna Street commemorating Cadet Konrad Okolski, codenamed Kuba

On the evening of August 10, the Radosław Group began evacuating the wounded and prisoners to the Old Town using captured vehicles. This evacuation was carried out under difficult conditions, through the rubble of the ghetto and under fire from German positions. However, the main forces of Kedyw were still holding in the Okopowa Street area. Meanwhile, from dawn on August 11, the Germans heavily shelled the insurgent positions. The shelling was conducted by mortars, grenade launchers, and a battery of five guns from Wola, as well as by the armored train's artillery. At 4:00 AM, Lieutenant Witold's company was forced to abandon the barricade at the intersection of Ostroroga and Młynarska streets. At 8:00 AM, a powerful German assault began from Młynarska Street and the Catholic cemetery, encompassing the entire Broda 53's sector from Gęsia Street to Spokojna Street. The Germans used Goliaths for the first time in this sector, with one of the mines being disabled by Lieutenant Mały. After an hour of fighting at the Jewish cemetery, the enemy approached assault distance to the Polish positions on Okopowa Street. The central point of Broda's defense became the "fortress" in the St. Kinga school at 55A Okopowa Street and Pfeiffer's tannery. Polish positions in the camp on Gęsia Street were also attacked from the direction of Pawiak. The greatest threat emerged on the northern flank of Radosław Group. The German 608th Security Regiment, supported by assault guns and anti-tank guns towed by infantry, conducted a strong attack towards Parysowski Square and Stawki, defended by the Czata 49 Battalion and a platoon from the Pięść Battalion. Around 9:00 AM, the Germans launched a sudden assault, capturing the warehouses and pushing the defenders back to Muranowska Street. Only Captain Sawa's unit held its positions on Dzika Street. The Germans also attacked the positions of the Leśnik Group, capturing the Customs Office building, although the remaining posts were held by the Poles. Radosław's units were at risk of being cut off from the Old Town.

In this critical moment, the Kedyw commander organized and personally led a counterattack on the southern flank of the German assault. The Miotła Battalion, about 300 soldiers, supported by the last tank from Wacek's platoon, took part in the counterattack. The Polish soldiers executed a swift maneuver along Niska Street, then, running through the ghetto ruins, struck the German positions at Parysowski Square and the Stawki warehouses. Soldiers from the Leśnik Group and the Chrobry I Battalion also attacked from Muranów. With a bold counterattack, Miotła and Chrobry I soldiers recaptured the Stawki warehouses and Parysowski Square around 10:30 AM, while Captain Wilnianin's company from the Leśnik Group pushed the enemy's left flank north of Inflancka Street towards the Warszawa Gdańska railway station, although they could not regain the Customs Office building. The insurgents captured many weapons, including two anti-tank guns and a heavy machine gun. However, the victory came at a high cost. Nearly 60 Miotła soldiers were killed, including the battalion commander, Captain Franciszek Mazurkiewicz, codenamed Niebora (brother of Lieutenant Colonel Radosław), Lieutenant Tadeusz Wiwatowski, codenamed Olszyna (commander of Kolegium A), and four other officers. Another 60 Miotła soldiers were wounded. Radosław himself was severely wounded. The last insurgent Panther tank was lost. Leśnik Group unit suffered 60 casualties, killed and wounded. Piotr Stachiewicz estimated Polish losses at 115 killed and 140 wounded.

Major Wacław Janaszek, codenamed Bolek, who took command of the group in place of the wounded Radosław, had to withdraw the depleted Miotła and position it along Dzika Street. The regained Stawki was again manned by the Czata 49 Battalion. Meanwhile, around 2:00 PM, the German pressure on Polish positions in the Okopowa Street area intensified. The remnants of the Alek Platoon were pushed out of the Jewish cemetery, although the Zośka Battalion still held the fortress and the school on Spokojna Street. Continuing the fight was pointless, so Major Bolek ordered a retreat to the Old Town. By 4:00 PM, the evacuation of equipment, prisoners, and wounded was completed, and under enemy fire, the main forces of the Broda 53 Brigade began withdrawing from the Okopowa Street area. The retreat was covered by Captain Sawa's unit, supported by the immobilized Panther's gunfire. By 5:30 PM, Broda regrouped at the school on Stawki. Czata 49 continued to hold the Stawki warehouses, maintaining communication with the Leśnik Group units on Inflancka Street until the afternoon of August 12, while the depleted Miotła was withdrawn to Długa Street, where it went into reserve. The Radosław Group's command moved to the tram depot on Muranowska Street. Stawki was to become a forward bastion of Old Town defense.

The most dramatic retreat was that of the Felek Platoon from the Zośka Battalion. Throughout the day, its soldiers fiercely defended the school on Spokojna Street, where the evacuation order reached them too late due to heavy enemy fire. During the retreat through the gardens on Kolska Street, the platoon commander, Cadet Konrad Okolski, codenamed Kuba, and several soldiers were killed. Due to heavy enemy fire, only about 15 insurgents reached the assembly point at the fortress on Okopowa Street by 4:00 PM. Five soldiers and three nurses, led by Andrzej Samsonowicz, codenamed Xiąże, arrived only after the evacuation was completed. Unable to march through the ghetto ruins due to heavy enemy fire, Felek Platoon soldiers hid in a garbage truck in the fortress yard. After numerous adventures and nearly five days, the entire group reached Kampinos, where they joined the local Home Army unit. Then, Felek soldiers, along with a detached forest unit, moved to Żoliborz and on August 24, after passing through the sewers, joined their comrades from Zośka fighting in the Old Town.

== Aftermath ==
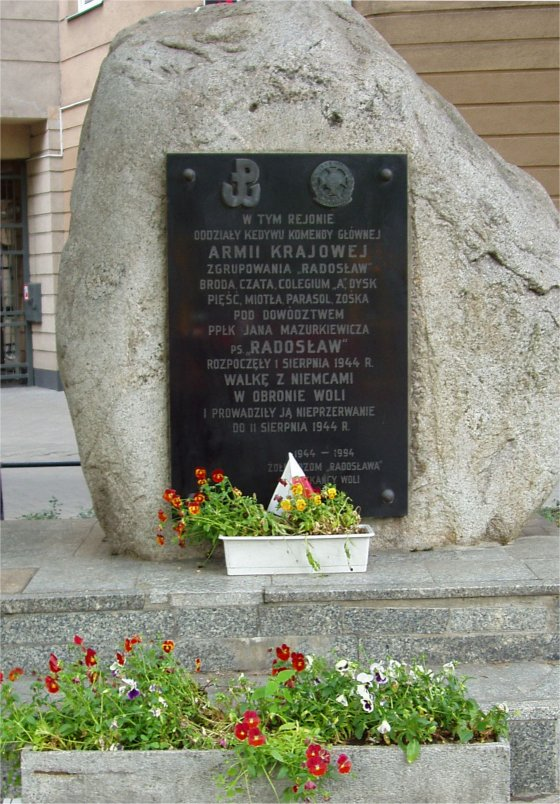
Boulder and plaque at 33 Okopowa Street commemorating the participation of the Radosław Group in the defense of Wola

By stubbornly defending the Wola cemetery complex, Kedyw managed to tie down the main forces of the German Kampfgruppe Reinefarth in this area for nearly six days. This delay gave Lieutenant Colonel Wachnowski precious time to complete the organization of the Old Town's defense. However, this was achieved at a tremendous cost. The Radosław Group was reduced to between 600 and 700 soldiers, which was less than half of its original strength. Particularly painful was the loss of many experienced officers and soldiers. After the battle for the cemeteries, only the Zośka, Parasol, and Czata 49 battalions were immediately ready to continue fighting.

Some historians have questioned the wisdom of the prolonged defense of the Wola cemeteries. Antoni Przygoński believed that the Home Army command would have been wiser to direct Kedyw's main forces to defend the Wola artery in the early days of August, where the main focus of the German assault was located. In this way, the defense of Wola might have been significantly extended. Przygoński also argued that by August 7, the Home Army High Command should have withdrawn the Radosław Group to the Old Town, as cooperating with other Home Army units in the more defensible positions in Muranów could have more effectively and cheaply protected the organization of the Old Town's defense. Instead, by engaging in a lone fight in partial encirclement, the elite Kedyw group was significantly bloodied, wasting the chances to prolong or even successfully conclude the defense of the Old Town. Piotr Stachiewicz believed that the prolonged defense of the Wola cemeteries led to disproportionate losses for the Radosław Group units, which were not justified by the overall tactical plan. The authors of the emigration publication Polish Armed Forces in World War II also considered that the Kedyw commander "prolonged the battles in the area of the St. Kinga school and Pfeiffer's factory on Okopowa Street beyond what was necessary for the Old Town as a whole."

In contrast, Bartosz Nowożycki took the opposite view, arguing that Wachnowski, by placing the Parasol Battalion in reserve, unnecessarily allowed significant territory to be surrendered. According to him, the loss of the cemeteries, caused partly by the lack of contact with Kampinos Forest, made the fall of the Old Town inevitable. Nowożycki believed that concentrating a large number of Home Army soldiers and civilians in a small area worsened the supply situation in that district. Furthermore, the departure of Kedyw from Wola facilitated the Germans in cutting off the Old Town, while it prevented the Polish side from conducting offensive manoeuvres.

== Commemoration ==
The participation of the Radosław Group in the battles fought in August 1944 in the Wola district has been commemorated by nine memorial plaques or boulders:

- 34 Anielewicza Street – a plaque on the building wall commemorates the liberation of 348 prisoners from Warsaw concentration camp by soldiers of the Zośka Battalion.
- 54/58 Młynarska Street – a plaque on the wall of the Evangelical cemetery commemorates 7 soldiers from the Alek Platoon, Rudy Company and Zośka Battalion, who fell on the cemetery grounds on 8 August 1944.
- 54/58 Młynarska Street – another plaque on the wall of the Evangelical cemetery (by the gate) commemorates soldiers of the Pięść Battalion who died in the battles for the Wola cemeteries.
- 33 Okopowa Street (corner of Mirecki Street) – a boulder and plaque commemorate the spot where soldiers of the Radosław Group began their insurgent battles in Wola.
- 55A Okopowa Street – a plaque on the wall of the Michał Konarski School Complex commemorates soldiers of the Zośka Battalion, particularly their role in the defense of Wola.
- Ostroroga Street, corner of Tatarska Street – plaques on the wall of the Powązki Cemetery commemorate soldiers of the Maciek Company and Zośka Battalion who died on 8 August 1944 during an unsuccessful raid on a German armored train.
- 13 Spokojna Street – a plaque on the wall of the Photographic School Complex commemorates cadet Konrad Okolski, codenamed Kuba, and 7 other soldiers from the Felek Platoon and Zośka Battalion who died on 11 August 1944.
- 40 Wolska Street – a boulder commemorates the defense of the Michler's Palace by soldiers of the 1st Company of the Parasol Battalion.
- 42 Żytnia Street – a gravestone in the Evangelical cemetery commemorates 60 soldiers of the Parasol Battalion who died, were murdered, or went missing in August 1944 during the defense of Wola.

== In culture ==
The fierce and costly battles fought by Kedyw in defense of the Wola cemeteries have been reflected in literature and film. They are depicted in the book Zośka and Parasol by Aleksander Kamiński, the second volume of the novel Columbuses. Year of Birth 20 by Roman Bratny, and the fourth episode of the TV series based on it. The battles in the Wola cemeteries are also mentioned in Melchior Wańkowicz's autobiographical novel Ziele na kraterze. The defense of the Wola cemeteries is also depicted in the 2014 film Warsaw 44 directed by Jan Komasa.

== Bibliography ==
- Bartoszewski, Władysław (2008). Dni walczącej stolicy: Kronika powstania warszawskiego (in Polish). Warsaw: Świat Książki. ISBN 978-83-247-1202-1.
- Bielecki, Robert; Kulesza, Juliusz (1996). Przeciw konfidentom i czołgom. Oddział 993/W Kontrwywiadu Komendy Głównej AK i batalion AK "Pięść" w konspiracji i Powstaniu Warszawskim 1944 roku (in Polish). Warsaw: Radwan-Wano. ISBN 83-906159-1-6.
- Borkiewicz, Adam (1969). Powstanie warszawskie. Zarys działań natury wojskowej (in Polish). Warsaw: Pax.
- Borkiewicz-Celińska, Anna (1990). Batalion "Zośka" (in Polish). Warsaw: Państwowy Instytut Wydawniczy. ISBN 83-06-01851-6.
- Kirchmayer, Jerzy (1984). Powstanie Warszawskie (in Polish). Warsaw: Książka i Wiedza. ISBN 83-05-11-080-X.
- Nowożycki, Bartosz (2011). "Czata 49": Relacje i wspomnienia żołnierzy batalionu Armii Krajowej w zasobie Archiwum Akt Nowych. Warsaw: Wydawnictwo historyczna.com.pl. ISBN 978-83-933204-1-7.
- Przygoński, Antoni (1980). Powstanie warszawskie w sierpniu 1944 r (in Polish). Vol. I. Warsaw: PWN. ISBN 83-01-00293-X.
- Stachiewicz, Piotr (1984). "Parasol". Dzieje oddziału do zadań specjalnych Kierownictwa Dywersji Komendy Głównej Armii Krajowej (in Polish). Warsaw: Pax. ISBN 83-211-0273-5.
- Stachiewicz, Piotr (1983). Starówka 1944. Zarys organizacji i działań bojowych Grupy "Północ" w powstaniu warszawskim (in Polish). Warsaw: MON. ISBN 83-11-06881-X.
