= Pałacyk Michla =

1944 song by Józef Szczepański

"Pałacyk Michla" (Michler Palace) is a 1944 song by poet and insurgent Józef Szczepański. Written during the Warsaw Uprising, it is one of his best known songs.

During the Warsaw Uprising of 1944 the Michler Palace in Warsaw was a site of intense fighting around August 4 and 5 involving the Parasol Battalion insurgent unit. Insurgent poet Józef Szczepański, a member of the Parasol unit, wrote a song (Pałacyk Michla) about those events, performing it in its vicinity on the evening of August 4. The song, published shortly afterward in an insurgent newspaper, quickly gained popularity among the partisans, was performed for them by a popular singer Mieczysław Fogg, and later, became known in the entire Poland. On the next day the Germans captured the building, which, damaged in the fighting, was demolished shortly after. The song has been called Szczepański's most famous song.

The song's tune was based on an earlier, pre-war Polish song "Nie damy Popradowej fali". That tune has been authored by the Slovak composer Jan Šťastný.
