= Red plague =

Red plague can refer to the following diseases:

- Smallpox
- Erysipelas
- Vibriosis, a systemic bacterial infection of marine and estuarine fishes, caused by the Vibrio genus. Also known as red pest, red boil, or saltwater furunculosis.

It can also have the following meanings:

- Red plague (corrosion), the corrosion of silver-plated copper
- Red plague, an epithet referring to communism. In this context it has been used in Józef Szczepański's 1944 poem "Czerwona Zaraza" (Polish for "Red Plague") and in the German marching song "Teufelslied".
- "Red plague" (Ciuma Roșie), an epithet referring to Social Democratic Party (Romania) used by the anti-corruption protesters supporting the independence of the judiciary in the context of 2017-2019 Romanian protests, alongside other complaints and accusations brought to the government.
- The Scarlet Plague, a novel written by Jack London
