= White Death =

White Death may refer to:

== Arts and entertainment ==
- White Death (novel), a 2003 book by Clive Cussler and Paul Kemprecos
- White Death (film), a 1936 Australian film starring Zane Grey as himself
- The White Death (film), a 1921 German silent drama film
- White Death (board game), a 1979 wargame published by Game Designers Workshop
  - White Death (video game), a 1989 video game based on the board game
- Cukor Bila Smerť (Sugar — White Death), an avant-folk band from Kyiv, Ukraine
- The White Death, an album by Fleurety
- "White Death", a song by Sabaton from Coat of Arms
- "White Death", a 2006 album by V/Vm
- "White Death", English translation of "Belaja smert", a song by KYPCK from Zero

== People ==
- Nikephoros II Phokas (c. 912–969), Byzantine emperor and general, known in the Muslim world as "White Death of the Saracens"
- Simo Häyhä (1905–2002), Finnish sniper in the Winter War, nicknamed "White Death" by the Red Army

== Other uses ==
- White death, a colloquial name for tuberculosis

== See also ==
- White plague (disambiguation)
