= Warsaw Uprising (disambiguation) =

Warsaw Uprising may refer to:

- Warsaw Uprising (1794)
- The opening stage of the November Uprising (1830)
- Warsaw Uprising (1905)
- Warsaw Ghetto Uprising (1943)
- Warsaw Uprising (1944)
- Cross of the Warsaw Uprising

== See also ==
- Battle of Warsaw (disambiguation)
- Powstanie Warszawskie (album)
