= Red Plague =

1944 poem by Józef Szczepański

"Red Plague" (Polish: "Czerwona Zaraza") is a Polish poem, written in 1944 by Józef Szczepański, a World War II–era poet, who died during the Warsaw Uprising. "Red Plague" inspired Polish Oscar-winning film director Andrzej Wajda to create the movie Kanał. The poem, which described the dashed hopes of Warsaw insurgents that the Red Army would save them, was banned in the People's Republic of Poland due to its anti-Soviet context; during the Joseph Stalin era the very possession of it was punishable by imprisonment.

Szczepanski wrote it on August 29, 1944, just a few days before his death (he died on September 10).

The author expressed his anger at the Red Army, telling the tale of desperation, of being brought to a point that the only way to save anything from this total ruin that engulfed Poland (with the Battle of Warsaw being the backdrop and an end game for Polish resistance fighters who made that last stand) was to surrender Poland to their worst, eternal and most despised of the enemies, one that could have helped but chose not to, one that was responsible for the majority of historical calamities that have befallen Poland, the source of all evil and darkness, a place that takes, never gives, a giant succubus that drained the Polish peoples' soul, sapped their spirit and feasted upon Poland's rotting carcass for centuries).

Red Army units, which were positioned on the eastern bank of the Vistula, did not help the insurgents:

We are waiting for you, red plague... you will be salvation welcomed with revulsion... we are waiting for you, our eternal enemy... bloody murderer of so many of our brethren.... Your red, victorious army has been lying at the bright feet of burning Warsaw and is feeding its soul with bloody pain of a handful of madmen who are dying in the ruins.

"Red Plague" was recorded by De Press on their album Myśmy Rebelianci in 2009. Excerpts of the poem were used by a Polish rock band, Lao Che, in its Warsaw Uprising album (in the song "Czerniakow").

== See also ==
- Polish literature
