= Michler's Palace =

Former townhouse in Warsaw, Poland

Coordinates: 52°14′4.4″N 20°58′13.7″E

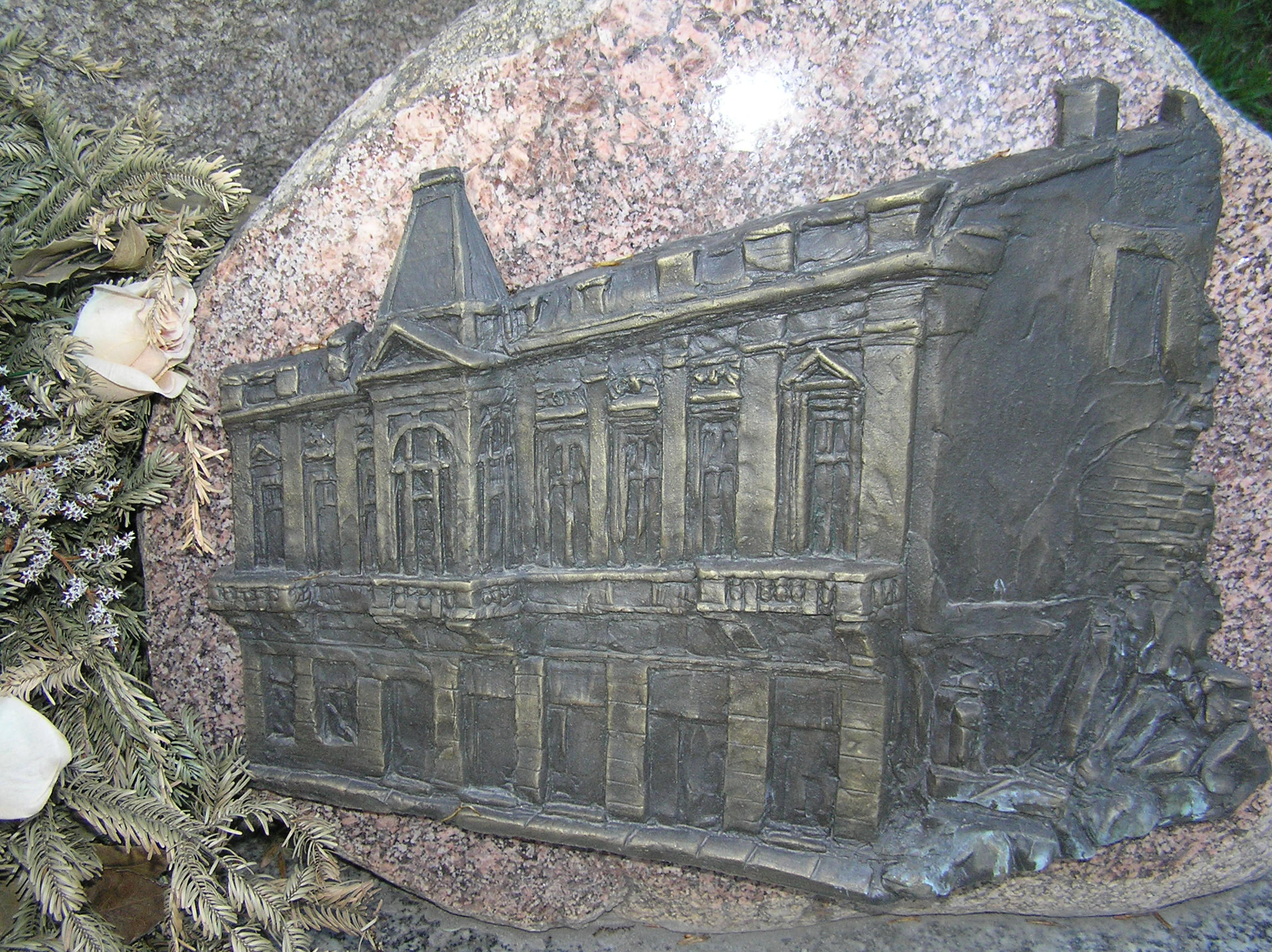
Michler Palace as shown in a monument now located near the building's former location

Michler Palace (Polish: Pałacyk Michlera, Pałacyk Michla) was a townhouse in Warsaw located at Wolska Street no 40 in the Wola district. It was constructed in the late 19th century and destroyed during the Warsaw Uprising in 1944. It is known for an eponymous wartime song, Pałacyk Michla, which was written by poet and insurgent Józef Szczepański.

== History ==
The term palace is colloquial, and the building was a townhouse (built in the eclecticism style) rather than formally a palace. It was nicknamed in such a way because it stood out as a high quality, decorative construction amidst its more mundane surroundings. The building belonged to Karol Michler, a merchant, miller and entrepreneur, who also had a small food factory in its vicinity, producing pasta and bread. The factory was taken over by Nazi Germany following their invasion of Poland in 1939.

During the Warsaw Uprising of 1944, the building was the site of intense fighting around August 4 and 5 involving the Parasol Battalion insurgent unit. Insurgent poet Józef Szczepański, a member of the Parasol unit, wrote a song (Pałacyk Michla) about those events, performing it in its vicinity on the evening of August 4. The song, published shortly afterward in an insurgent newspaper, quickly taken up by the partisans, was performed for them by a popular singer Mieczysław Fogg, and later, became known across Poland. On the next day the Germans captured the building, which, damaged in the fighting, was demolished shortly after. The song has been called Szczepański's most famous song, and its tune was based on an earlier, pre-war song by the Slovak composer Jan Šťastný.

In 2007, a monument commemorating the building and the fighting that took place during the Uprising was unveiled near the building's former location on Wolska Street.

== See also ==
- Wola massacre
