= Lao Che =

Lao Che may refer to:

- Lao Che (Indiana Jones), character of the Indiana Jones and the Temple of Doom
- Lao Che (band), a Polish music band
