= Zbigniew Rylski =

Polish lieutenant colonel (1923–2025)

Lieutenant Colonel Zbigniew Wiesław Rylski
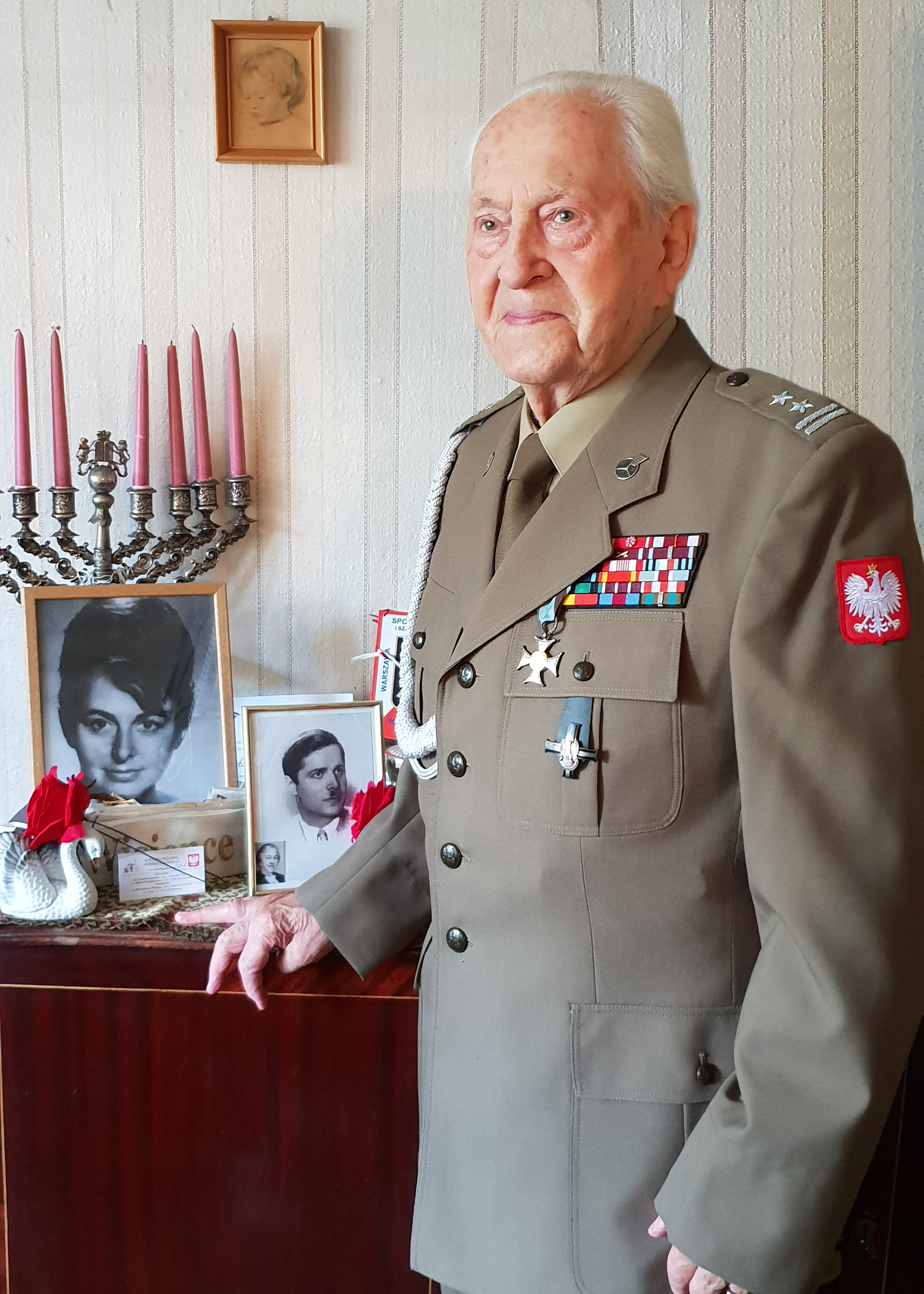
- Born: Zbigniew Wiesław Rylski; 23 January 1924; Lida, Poland
- Died: 7 November 2025 (aged 102) Warsaw, Poland
- Allegiance: Poland
- Branch: Home Army
- Service years: 1940–1945
- Rank: Podpułkownik
- Units: Parasol Battalion
- Conflicts: World War II

Zbigniew Wiesław Rylski (23 January 1923 – 7 November 2025) was a Polish Lieutenant Colonel and a veteran of the Second World War. He died on 7 November 2025, at the age of 102.
