= White plague =

White plague may refer to:

- Mycobacterium tuberculosis, the causative agent of tuberculosis
- White plague (intermetallic), a white gold-aluminium intermetallic compound
- White plague (coral disease), a disease caused by Aurantimonas coralicida bacteria
- The White Plague, a 1982 science fiction novel by Frank Herbert

== See also ==
- Black plague, a massively deadly plague of the 1300s
- Purple plague, an intermetallic compound of gold and aluminium
- Red plague (disambiguation)
- The White Disease, a 1937 play by Karel Čapek
