= Monument of Jews and Poles Common Martyrdom, Warsaw =

Monument in Poland

Monument of Jews and Poles Common Martyrdom in Warsaw
- Pomnik Wspólnego Męczeństwa Żydów i Polaków w Warszawie
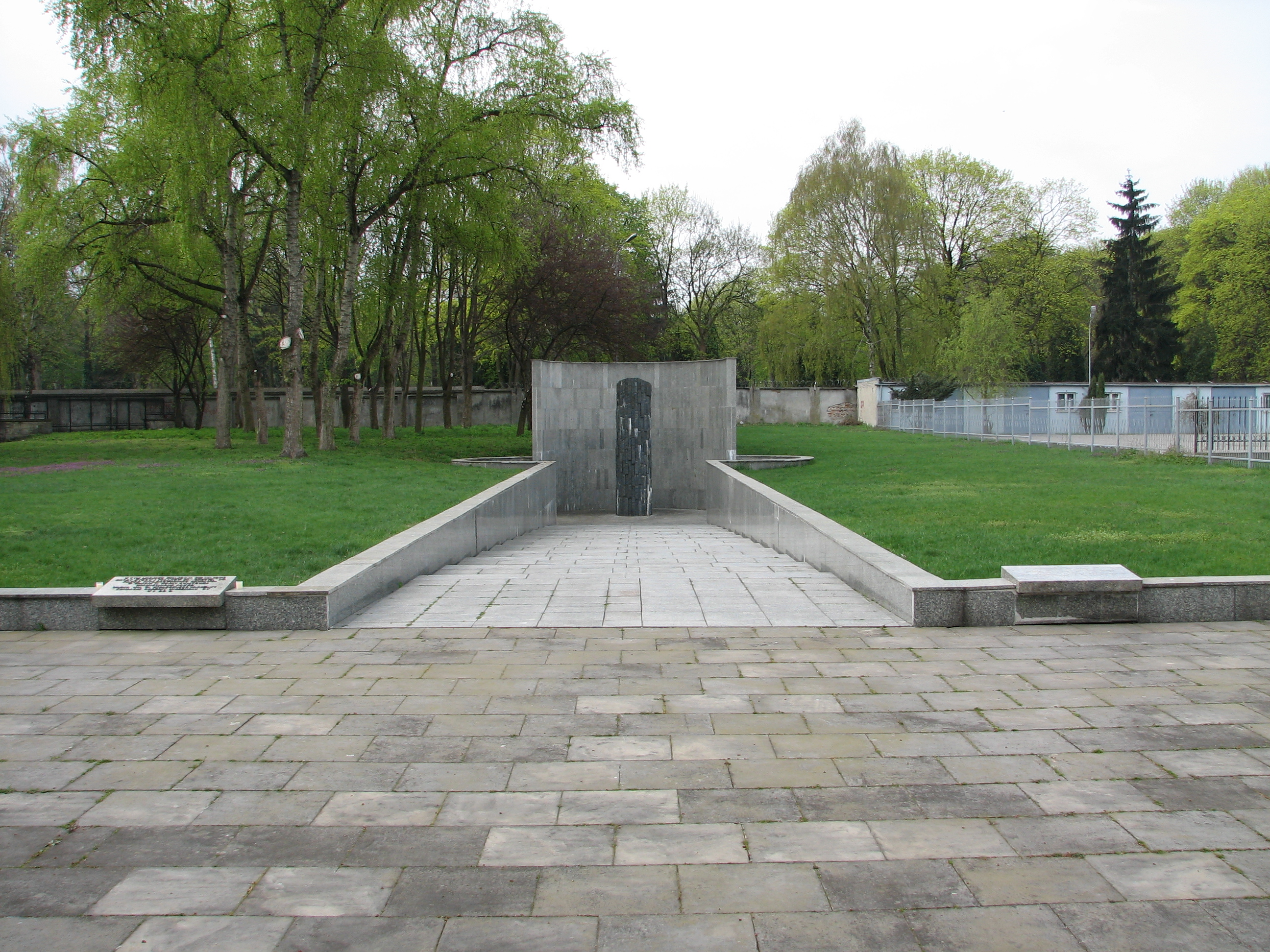
- Interactive map of Monument of Jews and Poles Common Martyrdom in Warsaw
- Location: Warsaw, Poland
- Coordinates: 52°14′36.7″N 20°58′27.5″E
- Designer: Tadeusz Szumielewicz, Marek Martens
- Completion date: 1989

Monument of Jews and Poles Common Martyrdom in Warsaw commemorates the martyrdom and death of seven thousand Jews and Poles who were murdered in mass executions in this place in 1940-1943 during the German occupation of Poland in World War II.
