= Jerzy Zborowski =

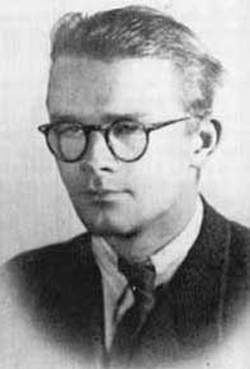
- Born: 26 July 1922; Warsaw, Second Polish Republic
- Died: 22 September 1944 (aged 22); Warsaw, General Government
- Burial place: Powązki Military Cemetery
- Military career
- Allegiance: Home Army
- Branch: Grey Ranks
- Rank: Porucznik (First lieutenant)
- Nicknames: Jeremi, Kajman Okularnik
- Unit: Parasol Battalion
- Commands: Commander of the Battalion
- Conflicts: Warsaw Uprising
- Awards: Silver Cross of Virtuti Militari; Officer's Cross of Polonia Restituta; Cross of Valour (twice); Gold Cross of Merit with Swords

Jerzy Eugeniusz Zborowski (nom de guerre: Jeremi, Jurek, Jurek Kowalski, Kajman Okularnik, Jurek Żoliborski) was born on 26 July 1922 in Warsaw and died in September 1944 in Warsaw, Poland). Zborowski was a partisan during Operation Arsenal and the assassin of Franz Bürkl in 1943.

He was a Polish Scoutmaster (harcmistrz), scouting resistance activist, porucznik of the Armia Krajowa and commander of the Battalion Parasol during the Warsaw Uprising. He was wounded during the Uprising and captured by the Germans. His subsequent fate remains unknown, he is assumed to have been murdered by the Germans.

== Awards ==
- Cross of Valour (Krzyż Walecznych), twice
- Gold Cross of Merit with Swords (Krzyż Zasługi z Mieczami)
- Silver Cross of Virtuti Militari
