= Lao Che (band) =

Polish rock band

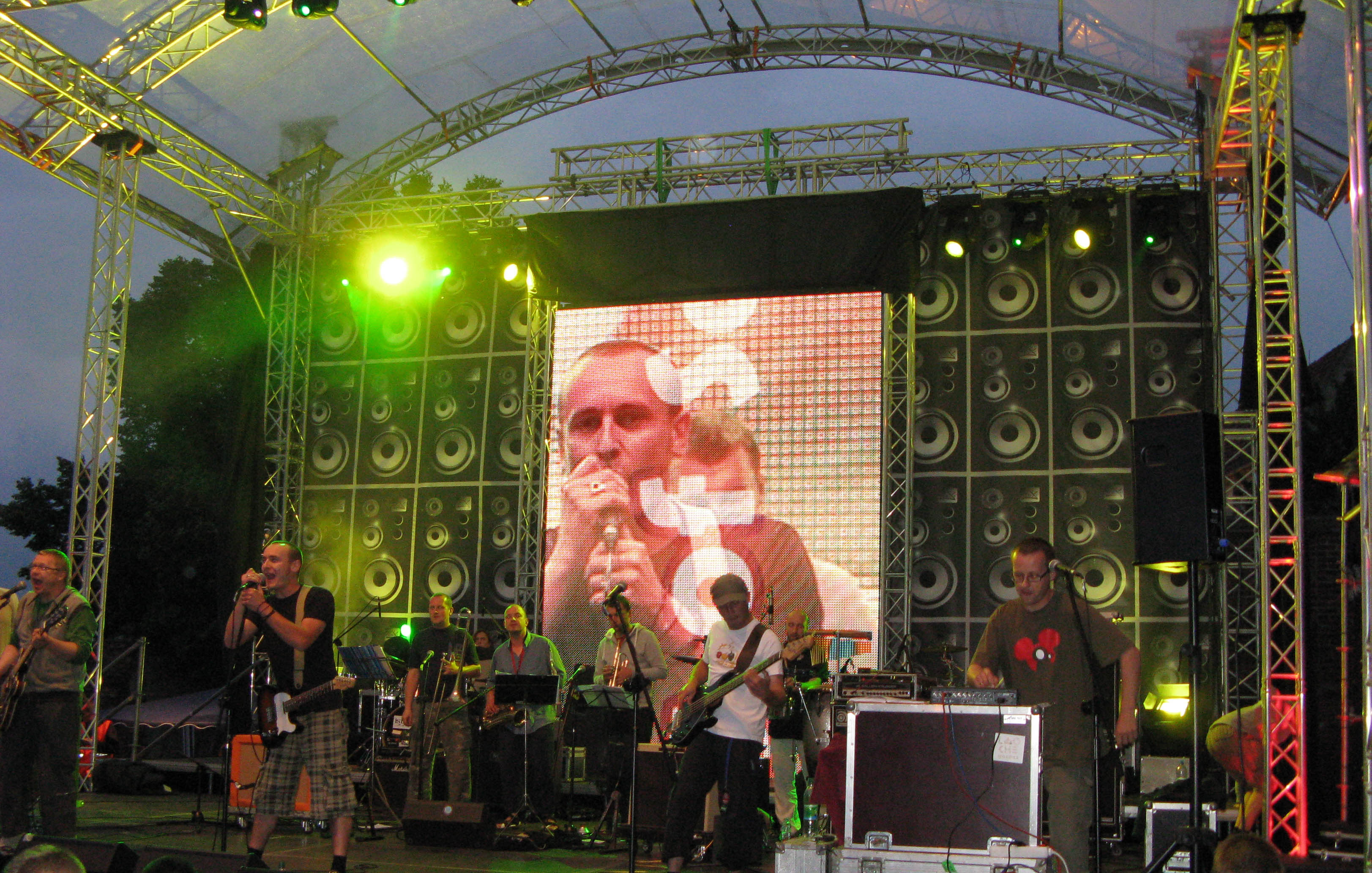

Background information
- Origin: Płock, Poland
- Genres: Alternative rock, folk, art rock
- Years active: 1999–2020
- Labels: S.P. Records; Ars Mundi; Mystic Production
- Website: www.laoche.art.pl

Lao Che is a Polish rock band formed in 1999 in Płock by former members of the band Koli. Lao Che's musical genre is a crossover of various styles such as ska, ambient, and folk. The band's popularity grew quickly after their Powstanie Warszawskie (Polish for "Warsaw Uprising") concept album, which received many prestigious nominations and awards. Its name comes from the character Lao Che from the movie Indiana Jones and the Temple of Doom.

Current members

- Mariusz Denst – sampler
- Hubert Dobaczewski – guitars, vocals
- Michał Jastrzębski – drums
- Filip Różański – keyboards
- Rafał Borycki – bass
- Maciek Dzierżanowski – percussion

Former members

- Jakub Pokorski – guitars
- Michał Warzycki - guitars

== Discography ==
=== Albums ===
Title	Album details	Peak chart positions	Sales	Certifications
Title	Album details	POL	Sales	Certifications
Gusła	Released: December 17, 2001; Label: S.P. Records; Formats: CD	—		
Powstanie Warszawskie	Released: March 21, 2005; Label: Ars Mundi; Formats: CD, LP, digital download	13	POL: 35,000+	POL: Gold
Gospel	Released: February 25, 2008; Label: Antena Krzyku; Formats: CD, LP, digital download	3		
Prąd stały/Prąd zmienny	Released: March 1, 2010; Label: Antena Krzyku; Formats: CD, digital download	5		
Soundtrack	Released: October 19, 2012; Label: Mystic Production; Formats: CD, digital download	3	POL: 15,000+	POL: Gold
Koncerty w Trójce. Volume 10	Released: December 3, 2013; Label: Polskie Radio; Formats: CD, digital download	36		
Dzieciom	Released: March 6, 2015; Label: Mystic Production; Formats: CD, digital download, vinyl	3	POL: 30,000+	POL: Platinum
Wiedza o społeczeństwie	Released: February 16, 2018; Label: Mystic Production; Formats: CD, digital download, vinyl	1	POL: 30,000+	POL: Platinum
"—" denotes a recording that did not chart or was not released in that territory.

=== Video albums ===
Title	Album details
Powstanie Warszawskie	Released: October 2006; Label: Muzeum Powstania Warszawskiego; Formats: DVD
Przystanek Woodstock	Released: December 4, 2008; Label: Złoty Melon; Formats: DVD
Powstanie Warszawskie. Spektakl muzyczny.	Released: April 8, 2014; Label: Muzeum Powstania Warszawskiego; Formats: DVD
