= Powstanie Warszawskie (album) =

Studio album by Lao Che
- Released: March 2005
- Genres: Alternative rock, punk rock, ska
- Length: 45:17
- Label: Ars Mundi

Lao Che chronology
Gusła (2002)	Powstanie Warszawskie (2005)	Gospel (2008)

Powstanie Warszawskie (Polish for "Warsaw Uprising") is a second studio album released in March 2005 by Polish band Lao Che. It consists of 10 songs illustrating the course of 1944 uprising in Warsaw, Poland. The album received many prestigious nominations and awards:

- No. 1 Event in 2005's Polish music by Gazeta Wyborcza
- The best album of 2005 by listeners of Polskie Radio—Program III
- One of the five best albums in 2005 by Przekrój
- Nominee in The Best Alternative Album category of Fryderyki 2005.

== Track listing ==
Titles in brackets are translated from Polish.

1. "1939 / Przed Burzą" (1939 / Before the Storm)
2. "Godzina W" (W-Hour)
3. "Barykada" (Barricade)
4. "Zrzuty" (Airdrops)
5. "Stare Miasto" (Old Town)
6. "Przebicie do Śródmieścia" (Breakout to the City Center)
7. "Czerniaków"
8. "Hitlerowcy" (Hitlerites)
9. "Kanały" (Sewers)
10. "Koniec" (The End)
