= Józef Szczepański =

Polish poet (1922–1944)

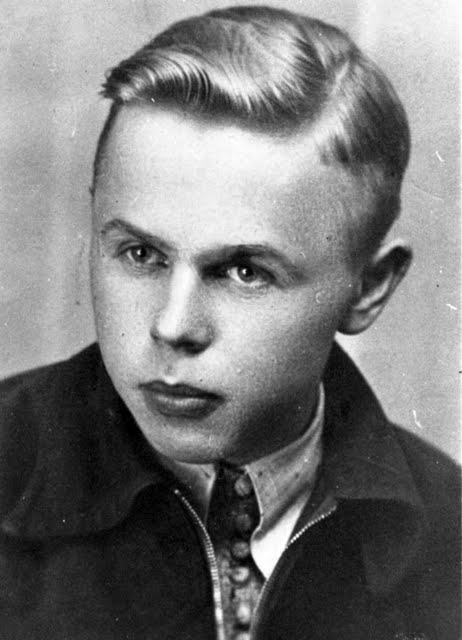
- Józef Szczepański
- Born: 30 November 1922; Warsaw, Second Polish Republic
- Died: 10 September 1944 (aged 21); Warsaw
- Burial place: Powązki Military Cemetery
- Military career
- Allegiance: Home Army
- Branch: Grey Ranks
- Rank: Podporucznik (Second lieutenant)
- Nickname: Ziutek
- Unit: Parasol Battalion
- Conflicts: Warsaw Uprising
- Awards: Silver Cross of Virtuti Militari; Cross of Valour (twice)

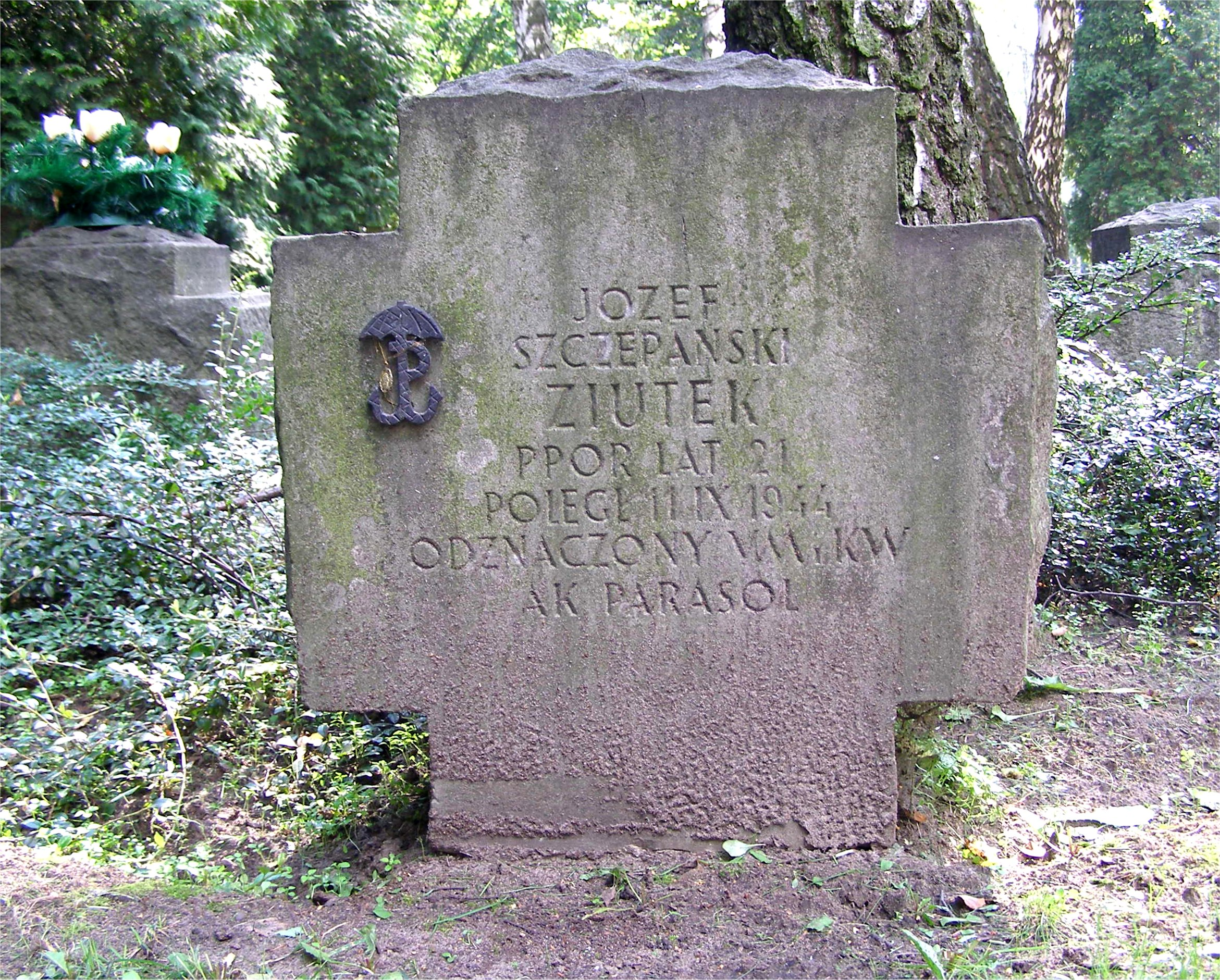
Józef Szczepański tombstone at Warsaw's Powązki Cemetery

Józef Szczepański (Polish pronunciation: [ˈjuzɛf ʂt͡ʂɛˈpaj̃skʲi]; 30 November 1922 in Łęczyca – 10 September 1944 in Warsaw) was a Polish poet who was a member of the Armia Krajowa Polish resistance. Commander of the Battalion Parasol during the Warsaw Uprising, known under his codename Ziutek, he was also a notable poet of the occupation period. Many of his poems were made into songs; the most notable one was "Pałacyk Michla".^{[a]}

== Biography ==
Szczepanski spent his childhood in several places, such as Łęczyca, Grudziądz, Jablonna and finally, some time in mid-1930s, he moved with the family to Warsaw. During the Polish September Campaign, he fled with parents to Volhynia, then moved to Rzeszów and Dębica. Finally, some time in the early 1940s, he returned to the capital of Poland. Back in Warsaw, Józef Szczepański continued his education in underground courses; interrupted by the German and Soviet attack on Poland. He also joined the Polish resistance (see: Szare Szeregi), becoming an officer candidate. He was a member of the squad that attempted to assassinate Nazi official, Wilhelm Koppe. Szczepanski was the soldier of the 1st Platoon of the 1st Company Agat of the Battalion Parasol, he publicly recited his first poem "Dzis ide walczyc - mamo" ("Today, I am going fighting, mother"), on 31 December 1943 in a house at 12 Swietojanska street in Warsaw. Soon afterwards, he became a bard of Parasol

During the Warsaw Uprising he was a squad leader in the Battalion Parasol (mostly composed of youths, many of them from Szare Szeregi underground scouting). He took command of the entire unit after its previous commander was killed. Wounded on the same day (1 September) in Warsaw Old Town, he was evacuated by his soldiers to Warszawa-Śródmieście but would die on 10 September.

Recipient of the Cross of Valour (twice), and the Virtuti Militari (5th class, posthumously).

== Poetry ==
Many of Szczepański's poems became popular in occupied Warsaw, particularly as he used them to chronicle the fights of the 'Parasol' Battalion; some were made into songs. Many were however destroyed during the Uprising; less than 20 survive to this day. His poetry, particularly his poem Red plague, was also one of the things that inspired Polish Oscar-winning film director, Andrzej Wajda, to create the movie Kanał. The poem, which described the failed hopes of Warsaw insurgents that the Red Army would save them, was banned in the People's Republic of Poland due to its anti-Soviet context; during the Joseph Stalin era the very possession of it was punishable by imprisonment. ^{[b]}

He is counted among the Generation of Columbuses - generation of Polish artists whose lives were dramatically impacted by the Second World War.

== Notes ==
a You can listen to "Pałacyk Michla" here

b Fragments of Red Plague: "We are waiting for you, red plague... you will be salvation welcomed with revulsion... we are waiting for you, our eternal enemy... bloody murderer of so many of our brethren...."
