= Parasol Battalion =

Unit of the Home Army's Kedyw for special tasks (Warsaw Uprising; Poland; 1943–1944)

Battalion Parasol (Umbrella)
- Emblem
- Active: 1944
- Country: Poland
- Allegiance: Polish Underground
- Branch: Armia Krajowa (Home Army)
- Type: Underground and urban warfare
- Engagements: Warsaw Uprising
- Decorations: Order Wojenny Virtuti Militari V class

Commanders
- Current commander: Józef Szczepański
- Notable commanders: Adam Borys

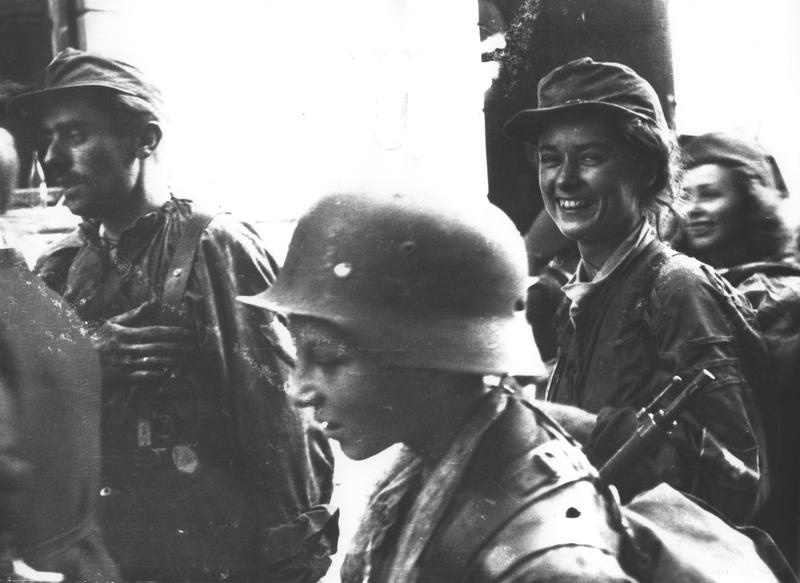
Parasol fighters during the Warsaw Uprising

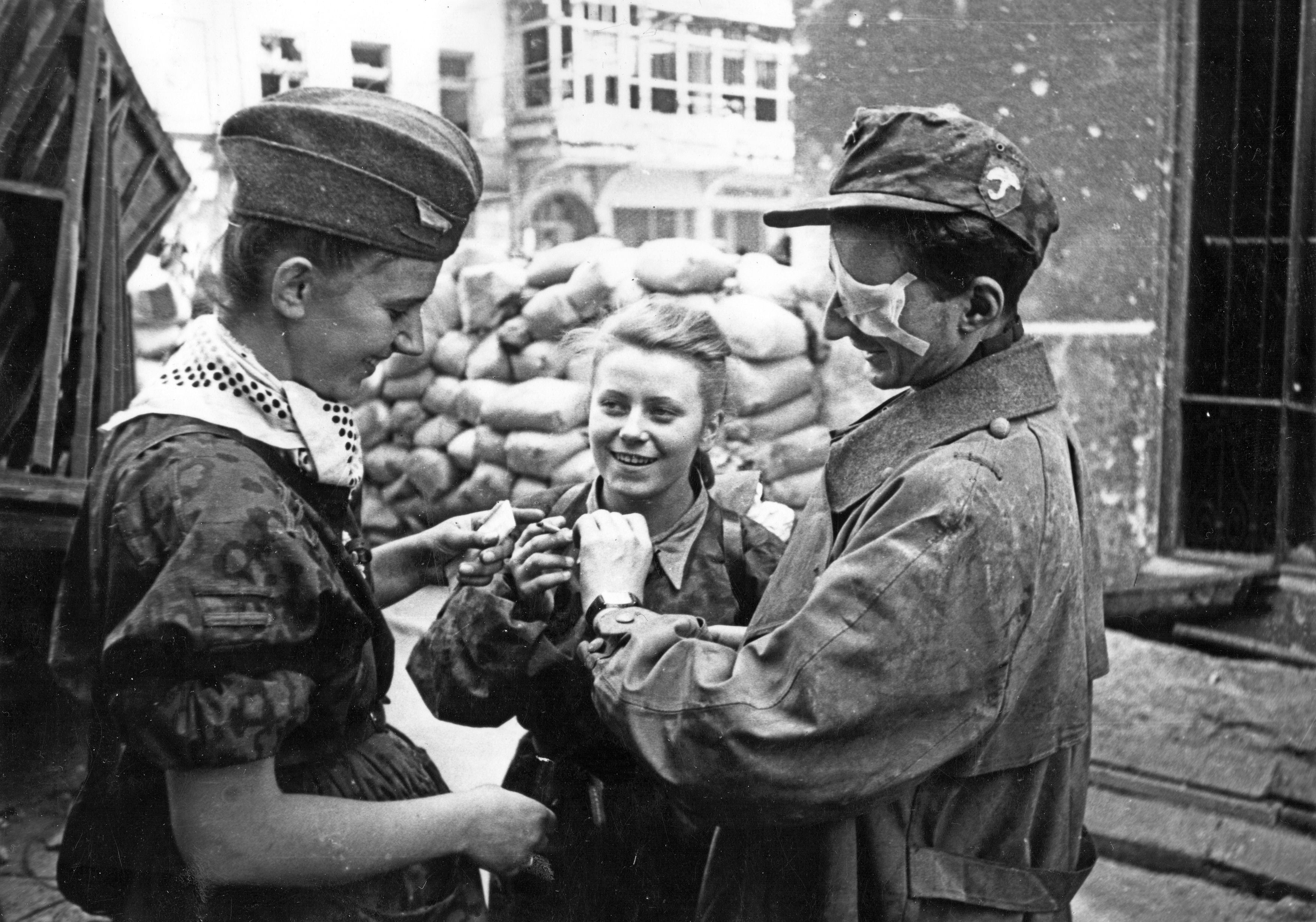
Soldiers of the battalion after coming out of sewers at Warecka Street (North Śródmieście district); Maria Stypułkowska-Chojecka "Kama" (center) and Krzysztof Palester "Krzych" (right)

Battalion Parasol (Polish: Batalion Parasol) was a Scouting battalion of the Armia Krajowa, the primary Polish resistance movement in World War II. It consisted primarily of members of the Gray Ranks. The battalion distinguished itself in numerous underground operations and took part in the Warsaw Uprising of 1944, as an element of the Radosław Group.

== History ==
It was first organized as "Agat" ("Anti-Gestapo") unit by Adam Borys "Pług", a Cichociemni elite soldier parachuted from England in the fall of 1943. Due to arrest of Tadeusz Kostrzewski "Niemira" on 2 January 1944 it changed its name to "Pegaz" ("Przeciw Gestapo – Against the Gestapo"), and after another arrest it was reorganized as "Parasol" (umbrella) battalion. The last name referred to a parachute, as the unit was intended to join Polish 1st Independent Parachute Brigade in free Poland.

The battalion is renowned for its numerous military actions in 1943–1944. It organized assassination missions, targeting key Gestapo officers and high-ranking Nazi Germany officials who were responsible for extreme terror in the Warsaw District. One such mission was successfully carried out under the code name Operation Kutschera, which resulted in assassination of the SS and Police Leader Franz Kutschera, who was shot in the center of Warsaw (in front of the SS Headquarters) in February 1944.

Józef Szczepański, a poet, was among the commanders of this unit. The poet Krzysztof Kamil Baczyński fought in its ranks and was killed in action by a German sniper in the first few days of the Warsaw Uprising.

Heir to the tradition of the battalion is JW Komandosów and its detachment Zespół Bojowy C.

== Notable members ==
- Krzysztof Kamil Baczyński
- Adam Borys
- Józef Szczepański
- Jerzy Zborowski
- Czeslaw Gajewski
- Zbigniew Rylski

== Losses during the Warsaw Uprising ==
district	casualties	%
Wola	54	19.2
Stare Miasto	118	41.8
Czerniaków	91	32.3
Mokotów	2	0.7
other	17	6.0
overall	282	100
