= Warsaw concentration camp =

Nazi concentration camp in German-occupied Poland during World War II

Warsaw
- Nazi concentration camp
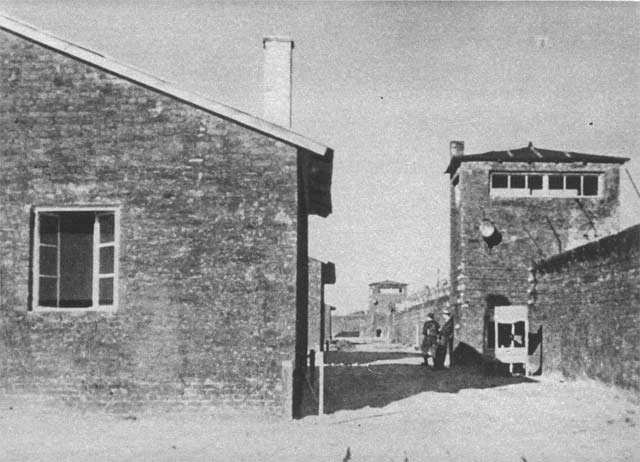
- Barracks and watchtowers of KL Warschau during capture of the concentration camp by Battalion Zośka, 5 August 1944
- Coordinates: 52°14′54.3″N 20°59′23.7″E
- Other names: See relevant section
- Known for: Discredited extermination camp theory
- Location: Warsaw, General Government, German-occupied Poland
- Built by: Camp's inmates
- Operated by: Nazi Germany
- Commandant: Wilhelm Göcke (June 1943 – September 1943); Nikolaus Herbet (September/October 1943 – April 1944); Wilhelm Ruppert (May–June 1944)
- Original use: Gęsiówka prison
- First built: 19 July 1943 – 10 June 1944
- Operational: 19 July 1943 – 5 August 1944
- Inmates: Mostly Jews from countries other than Poland (Greece and Hungary in particular); 300 Germans
- Number of inmates: 8,000–9,000
- Killed: 4,000–5,000 prisoners total: 20,000
- Liberated by: Home Army during the Warsaw Uprising

Warschau (see other names) was a Nazi concentration camp in German-occupied Poland during World War II. It was formed on the base of the since-demolished Gęsiówka prison, in what is today the Warsaw neighbourhood of Muranów, on the order of Reichsführer-SS Heinrich Himmler. The camp operated from July 1943 to August 1944.

Located in the ruins of the Warsaw Ghetto, KL Warschau first functioned as a camp in its own right, but was demoted to a branch of the Majdanek concentration camp in May 1944. In late July that year, due to the Red Army approaching Warsaw, the Nazis started to evacuate the camp. Around 4,000 inmates were forced to march on foot to Kutno, 120 km (75 mi) away; those who survived were then transported to Dachau. On 5 August 1944, KL Warschau was captured by Battalion Zośka during the Warsaw Uprising, liberating 348 Jews who were still left on its premises. It was the only German camp in Poland to be liberated by anti-Nazi resistance forces, rather than by Allied troops. After the Red Army definitively expelled the Germans from Warsaw in January 1945, the new communist administration continued to run the buildings as a forced labour camp, and then as a prison, until it was closed in 1956. All the camp's premises were demolished in 1965.

The Encyclopedia on Camps and Ghettos says that a total of 8,000 to 9,000 inmates were held there, while Bogusław Kopka estimates the number as at least 7,250 prisoners, all but 300 of whom were Jews from various European countries, in particular from Hungary and Greece. The Jewish inmates were used as forced labor to clean the ruins of the Warsaw Ghetto, with the ultimate goal of creating a park in the former ghetto's territory. They also had to find and sort whatever precious items were still left on its territory. The camp and adjacent ruins were additionally used by the German administration as a place of execution, the victims being Polish political prisoners, Jews caught on the "Aryan side", and generally people rounded up on the streets of Warsaw. About 4,000 to 5,000 prisoners died during the camp's existence, while the total number of people murdered in the camp is estimated at 20,000.

The camp played a comparatively minor role in the Holocaust and thus seldom appears in mainstream historiography. However, it has been at the centre of a conspiracy theory, first promoted by Maria Trzcińska, a Polish judge who served for 22 years as a member of the Chief Commission for the Prosecution of Crimes against the Polish Nation. The theory, refuted by mainstream historians, contends that KL Warschau was an extermination camp operating a giant gas chamber inside a tunnel near Warszawa Zachodnia railroad station and that 200,000 mainly non-Jewish Poles were gassed there.

== Name ==
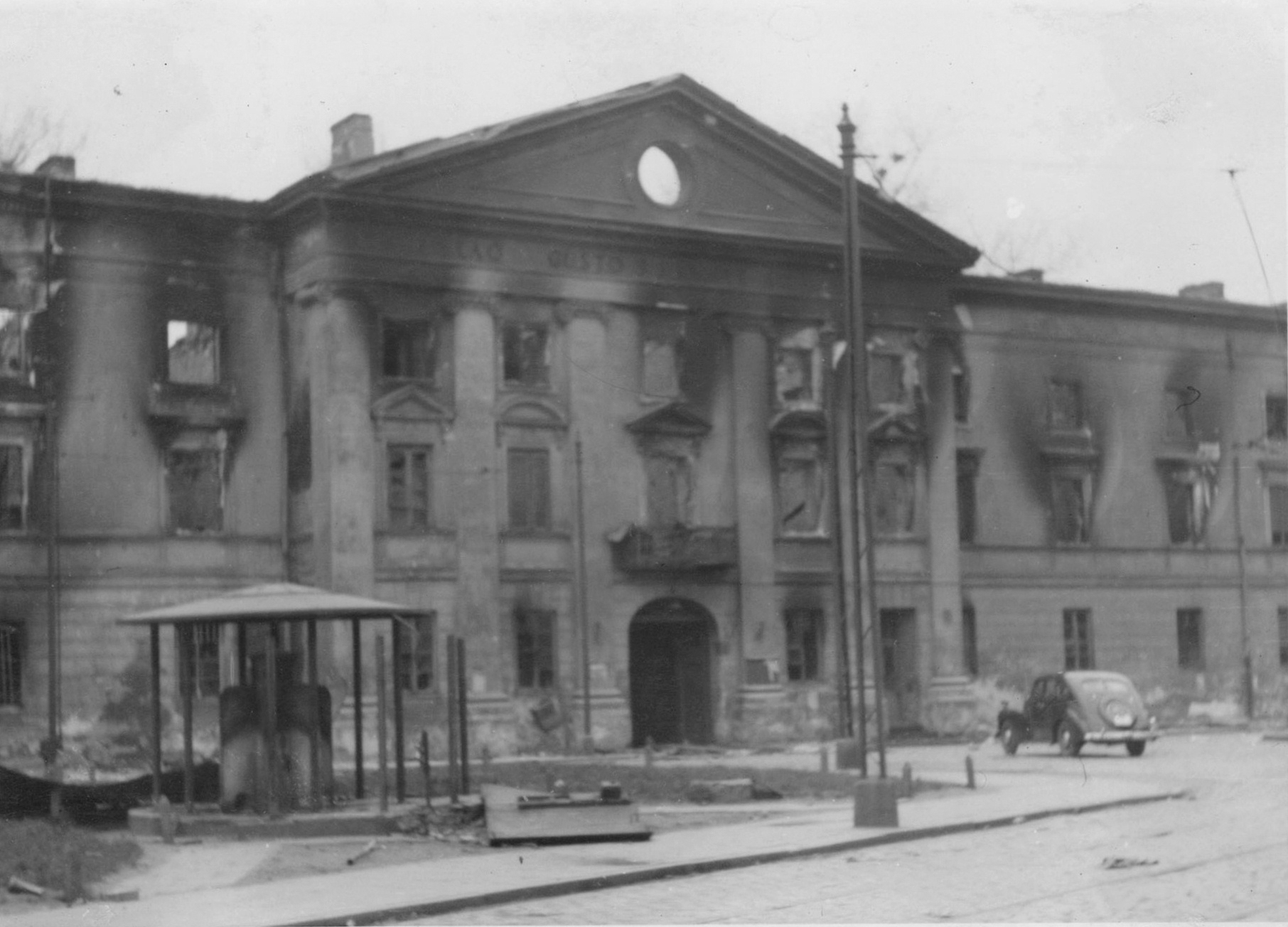
The building of the Wołyń Caserns was commonly known as Gęsiówka. Photo of the burnt edifice taken during the Warsaw Ghetto Uprising

During the first nine months, the Warsaw concentration camp functioned in its own right. At this time it carried the official name of Waffen-SS Konzentrationslager Warschau (often referred to as KL Warschau for short in Nazi documents and in Polish scholarship, or, in most contemporary German-language works, KZ Warschau). In May 1944, KL Warschau became a branch of Majdanek concentration camp, (Note: Majdanek also served as an extermination camp) so the camp's name changed to Waffen-SS Konzentrationslager Lublin – Arbeitslager Warschau, 'Waffen-SS Concentration Camp Lublin – Labour Camp Warsaw'. It was also sometimes referred to in German sources as Arbeitslager Warschau.

The name Gęsiówka (IPA: [ɡɛ̃ˈɕufka]) often appears in Polish sources. This is due to the fact that the camp occupied the complex of now non-existent Wołyń Caserns, which were relatively well-preserved after the Warsaw Ghetto Uprising. The caserns, at the corner of then-existing Gęsia and Zamenhof streets, were a military prison before World War II. During German occupation, they accommodated the central prison for the Jewish district, the correcting labour camp of the Sicherheitspolizei, as well as the Judenrat. The prison complex became colloquially known as Gęsiówka (named for Gęsia street), which nickname transferred to KL Warschau as well. Supporters of the Trzcińska's theory tend to prefer the German name, which Aleksandra Ubertowska says has to do with the name being perceived as more serious.

After World War II, the camp, although with changed purposes, was still run by Communist authorities under other names (see the relevant section for details).

== Creation ==
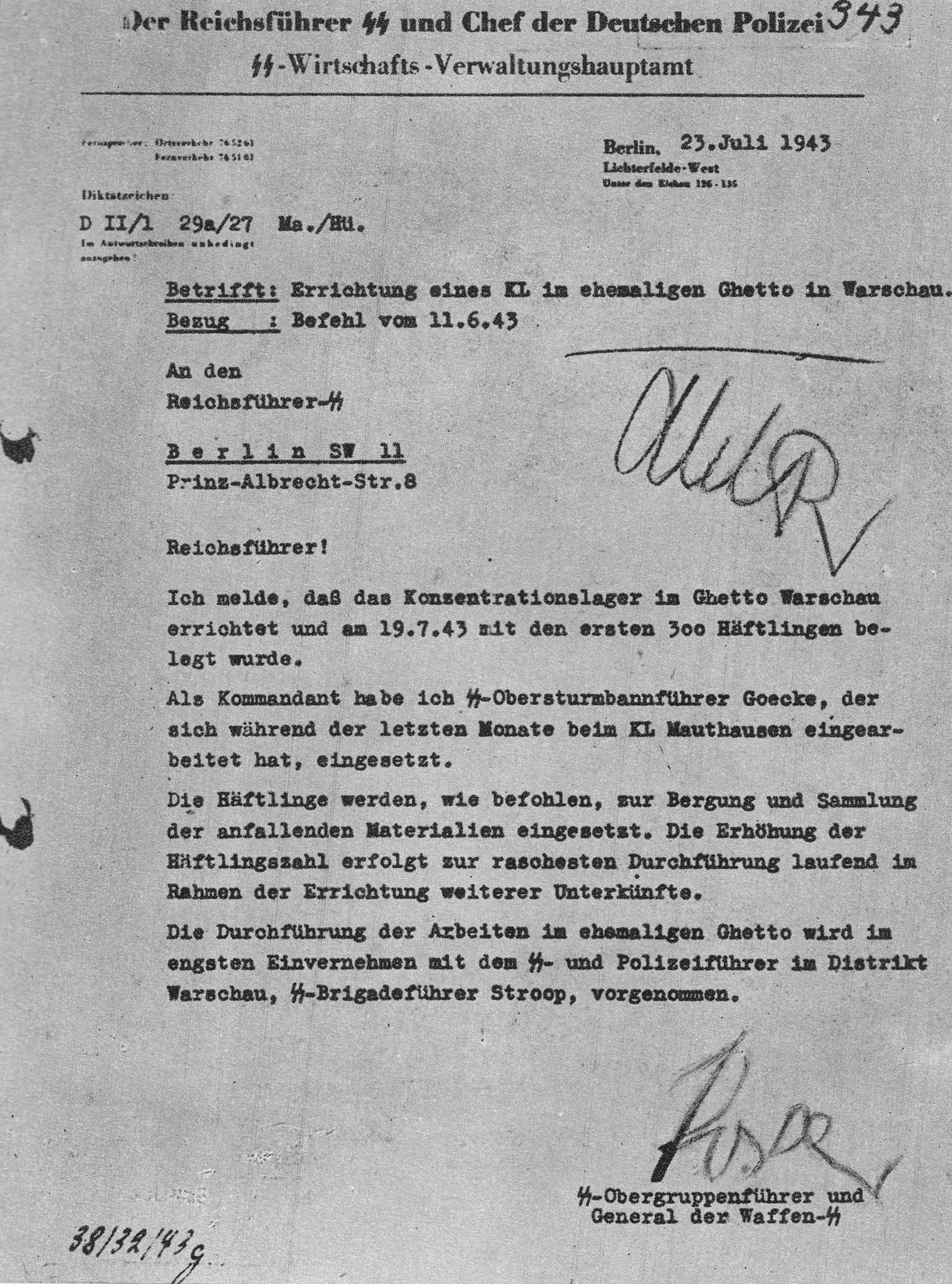
Letter from Oswald Pohl to Heinrich Himmler, dated 23 July 1943, on the creation of KL Warschau, noting arrival of the first 300 prisoners

According to Bogusław Kopka, the first person behind the idea of creating a new concentration camp in Warsaw was Heinrich Himmler, head of the Schutzstaffel (SS), who mentioned it in a letter dated 9 October 1942. The letter informed the local posts of SS and the Wehrmacht in the General Government that all Jewish craftsmen who so far had managed to avoid deportation to extermination camps were to be "assembled by SS-Obergruppenführer Krüger and SS-Obergruppenführer Pohl on the spot, i.e. in the concentration camps in Warsaw and Lublin (Note: The "Lublin camp" (Majdanek) was already functioning when the letter was written)". The two camps were also intended to host Jewish labourers, who were supposed to be working for weapons factories operating on-site; as for production facilities, they were planned to be successively moved to concentration camps near Lublin, and then farther east. Himmler assumed that concentrating all Jewish labour in the camps controlled by the SS Main Economic and Administrative Office (SS-WVHA) would be the basis for the creation of an SS economic empire in the East. His ideas, however, were met with resistance from the military, the police and civil administration of the General Government, as well as from the Reich Ministry of Armaments and War Production and from German companies using Jewish slave labour. Himmler was thus unable to bring his idea to fruition, so the concentration camp in Warsaw did not appear, nor did all factories using Jewish labour become controlled by SS.

As plans to demolish the Warsaw Ghetto appeared, Himmler soon returned to the idea of creating a concentration camp in Warsaw. In a letter dated 16 February 1943, Himmler instructed SS-Obergruppenführer Oswald Pohl, head of SS-WVHA, to create a concentration camp in the "Jewish district" and ordered all German-owned private enterprises operating in the Ghetto to be relocated there. The camp, together with its enterprises and inhabitants, was planned to be "transported as quickly as possible to Lublin and nearby areas". On the same day, Himmler also wrote a letter to SS-Ogruf Friedrich-Wilhelm Krüger, Higher SS and police leader for the General Government, which demanded that the buildings of the deserted ghetto be demolished after the concentration camp was transported to Lublin. The task of demolition, it was suggested, was to be handed over to the local Jews. The idea's implementation was marred with numerous difficulties, so when the Germans decided to accelerate the deportations on 19 April, they met strong resistance from the Jews, who began the Warsaw Ghetto Uprising. The concentration camp failed to materialise again, and only part of the enterprises, together with some of the Jews, were evacuated to the concentration camps in Majdanek, Trawniki, and Poniatowa.

The idea of the camp was revived once again after the failure of the Warsaw Ghetto Uprising. SS-Brigadeführer Jürgen Stroop, who led the efforts aimed at quashing the insurgency, proposed on 16 May 1943, the day the uprising came to an end, to convert the Pawiak prison to a concentration camp. The building was previously used by the SD and the Sicherheitspolizei (Security Police). It is suggested that by creating such a camp, the Germans wanted to destroy evidence of the crimes committed during the suppression of the uprising as well as to enrich themselves by the loot that would be collected in the rubble by slave labourers. Himmler agreed to the proposal and issued the order, which read:

I herewith order, that the Dzielna prison [Pawiak prison – note] in the former ghetto of Warsaw, is to be transformed into a concentration camp. The prisoners are to gather and secure the millions of building stones, scrap iron, and other building material from the former ghetto. Special care is to be taken for the secure guards of the prisoners during this work.

I instruct [...] to make sure that during this cleaning up the city center of the former ghetto is to be flattened completely and every cellar and every canalization is to be filled in.

After the work is finished the area is to be covered up with earth and a large park is to be planted.

— Heinrich Himmler, letter to Oswald Pohl ordering him to make the Jews completely flatten the destroyed Warsaw Ghetto, 11 June 1943 (emphasis in original)

Eventually, Pawiak's status as a prison did not change, but the concentration camp was created on nearby Gęsia street, which was also located inside the Ghetto walls. One of the reasons why Gęsiówka was chosen was because it was among the only buildings left intact in the area previously occupied by the Ghetto. In addition to that, Bogusław Kopka argues that its position within a deserted area with restricted access to civilians was also a factor. Another advantage was the camp's proximity to the warehouses at Umschlagplatz as well as German militarised units: an SS outpost on Żelazna street, a strong German army command at Stawki street and the staff of the Pawiak prison, all of whom could be quickly dispatched in case of mutiny.

On 19 July 1943, the first 300 prisoners, who were German and predominantly criminals, were transported from Buchenwald concentration camp. This date is considered to be the day when KL Warschau started operation.

== Description ==
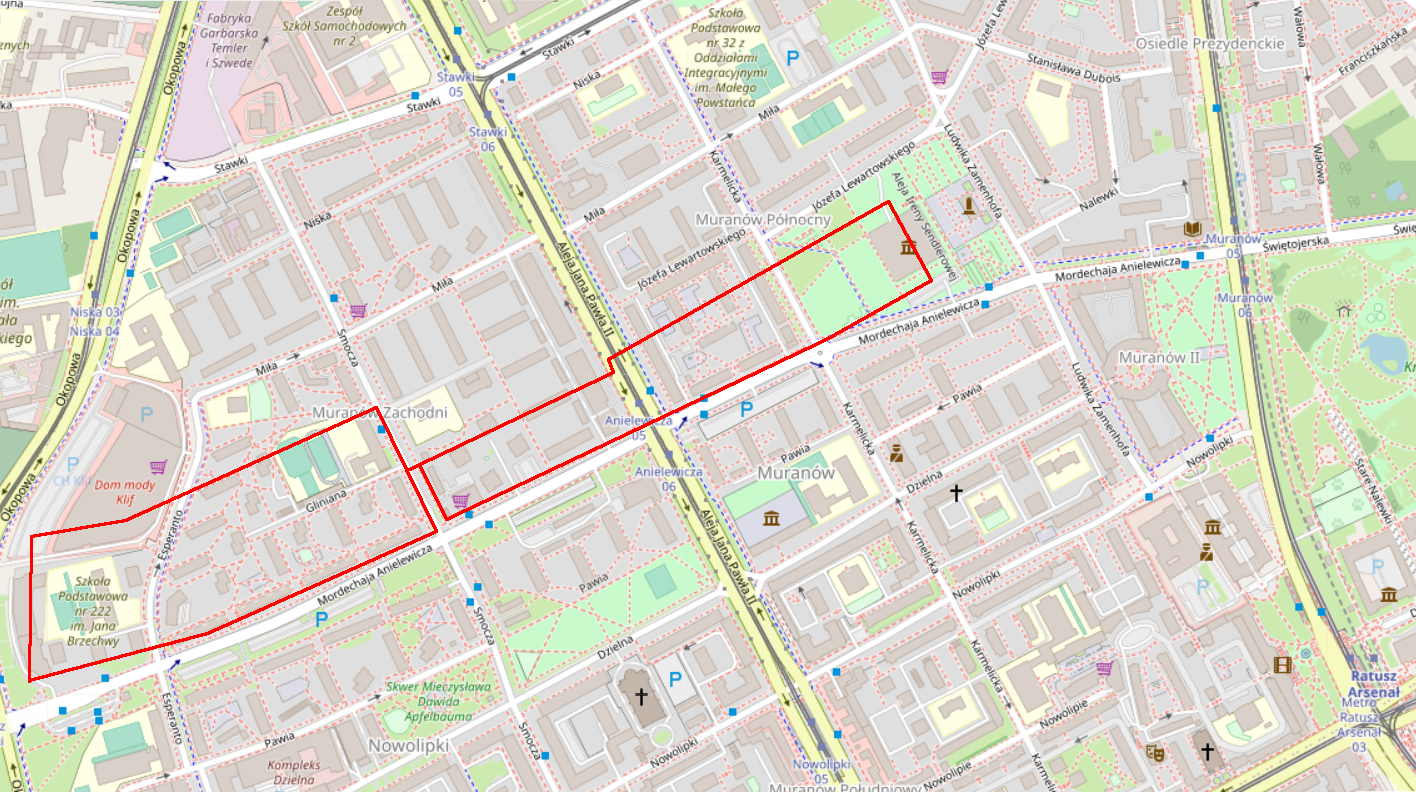
Outline of the Warsaw concentration camp as overlaid on today's map of Warsaw. The Lager I (old part) is to the east of Smocza Street, while Lager II (new part) is to its west

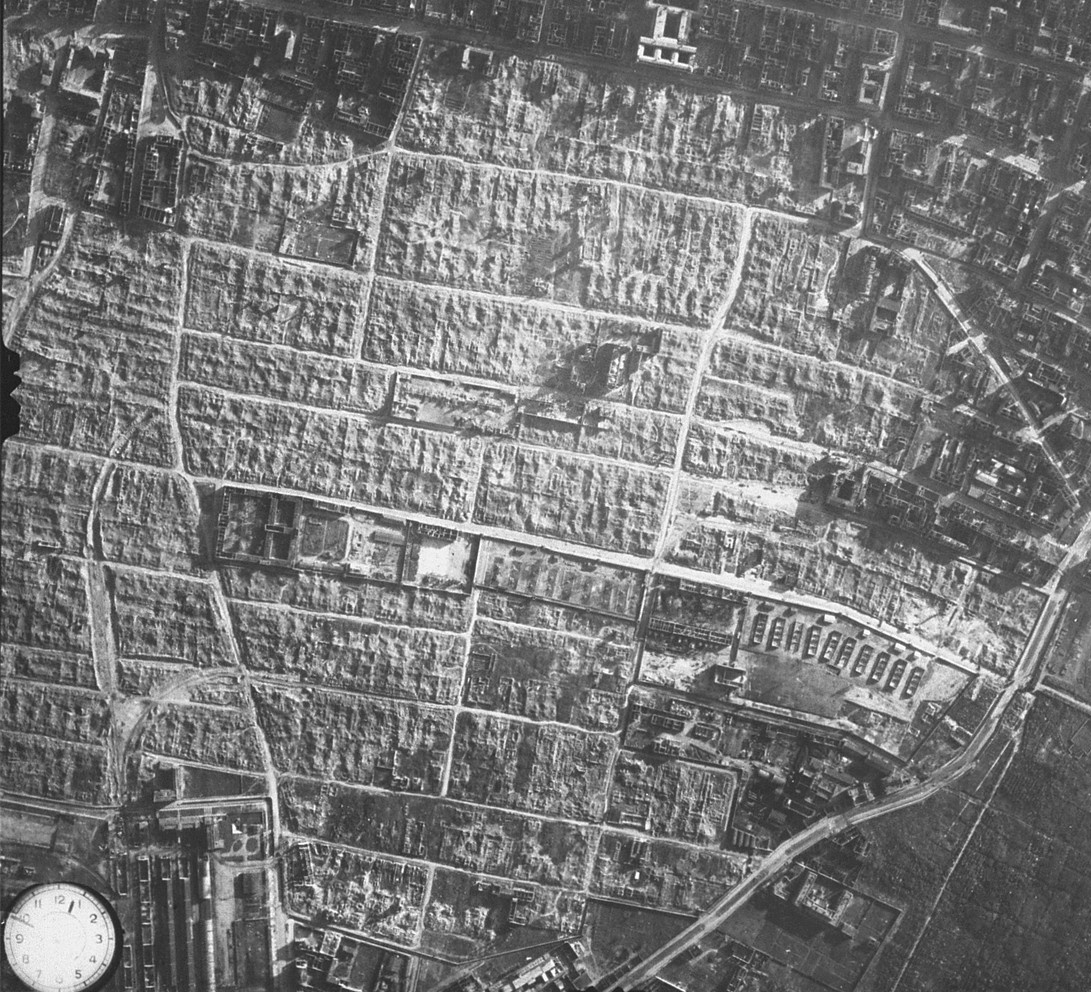
An aerial photograph of the Warsaw Ghetto (south to the top), probably taken in November 1944, showing the camp's structure (a long and narrow rectangle in the image's centre) surrounded by the ghetto's ruins. For the detailed scheme of the camp, see external links section

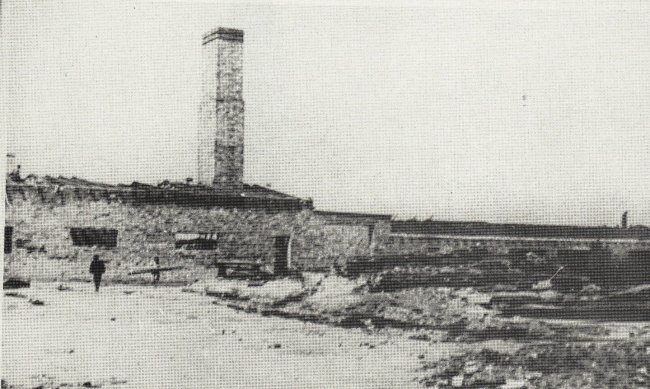
Warsaw concentration camp's crematorium

=== Location and facilities ===
The Warsaw concentration camp was created inside a closed and deserted zone of the former ghetto, which was surrounded by walls regularly patrolled by German guards and the police. Gęsiówka, a former military prison, and spaces along Gęsia Street were adapted for the purposes of the camp. Since none of the camp's buildings survived, its general appearance and facilities can only be deduced from witness testimony, aerial photography, and photos made during exhumations and after the camp's liberation. According to the evidence, KL Warschau was divided into two parts. The first, called Lager I and also known as "the old camp", was located between what is now John Paul II Avenue and Smocza Street, and comprised Gęsiówka proper (the camp's easternmost part) and wooden barracks erected during the initial months of the camp's operation. The camp's second part, between Smocza and Okopowa Streets, was called Lager II or "the new camp" and contained brick barracks. (Note: The initial project of the Warsaw concentration camp created by Hans Kammler assumed that three camp sectors would have appeared by late February 1944, but the third never materialised, and the camp's capacity was halved.) In total, 21 barracks were built, each around 70 m (230 ft) long with a capacity of c. 600 inmates.

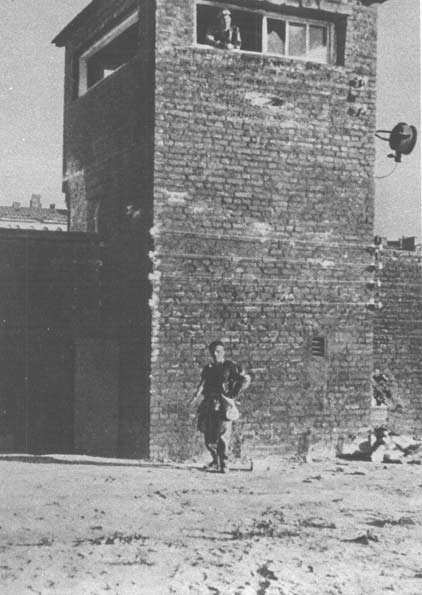
Close-up of one of the towers protecting the concentration camp. Photo taken during the camp's liberation. Soldiers from Zośka Battalion appear in the photo

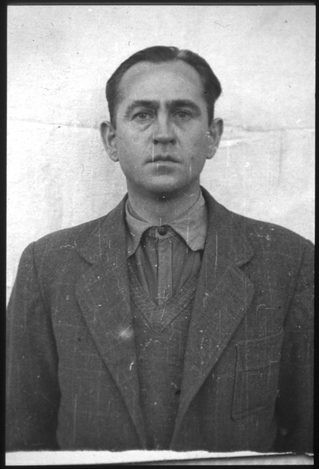
Wilhelm Ruppert, the last commandant of KL Warschau. Mugshot taken in Allied custody

The camp was surrounded by high walls guarded by watchtowers. The main entrance was located at what was then Gęsia Street 24. The former military prison and Judenrat seat, at what is today Karmelicka Street 17a, served as a crematorium for bodies of dead inmates and executed civilians from outside the camp. The Germans also started building two other cremation sites, but did not manage to open them before they evacuated the camp; even the one that existed was not operated in the camp's final days. Additionally, one of Gęsiówka's buildings was used as a torture room, while a prison yard came to be an SS officers' mess. A bathhouse was built in late 1943 and early 1944, and bunkers were also available on-site. By February 1944, the camp's infrastructure was in an advanced stage of completion, with 90% of Lager I and 75% of Lager II finished (Berenstein gives figures of 95% and 60%, respectively). However, the construction was repeatedly halted due to the recurring typhus epidemic, which decimated the inmate population and forced the camp's administration to quarantine the premises twice (in January and February 1944, see below, and again in April and May). Therefore, work on the camp was only completed in June 1944.

=== Personnel ===
Initially, about 380 SS soldiers were maintaining the concentration camp, approximately the size of a company. The number of SS guards was relatively low, as the former ghetto, itself a closed zone, was surrounded by patrolled walls, and due to the fact that the prisoner functionaries were Germans from the initial transport and were thus delegated much more power than was usual for their counterparts in other camps. The original SS unit was gathered from various other camps, including the Trawniki concentration camp and the Sachsenhausen concentration camp. Following the attachment to Majdanek in May 1944, they were replaced with SS personnel from Lublin, and the guard was reduced to 259 people. Leadership positions were occupied by high- and middle-ranking SS members who were pre-war Third Reich citizens (Reichsdeutsche), while the rank-and-file were usually recruited among the Volksdeutsche, mainly from Southeast Europe but also from other areas.

In comparison with other concentration camps, KL Warschau had a less sophisticated internal structure. Bogusław Kopka writes that the camp lacked the political department (Politische Abteilung), and some other positions remained unoccupied. Conversely, the Institute of National Remembrance's report on the investigation of the crimes committed in KL Warschau says that the Politische Abteilung did exist, but it was directly subordinate to the commandant of Sicherheitsdienst and Sicherheitspolizei in Warsaw, instead of being the main department of the camp's administration. Among the 208 identified members of the camp's administration, SS-Uscharf Karl Leuckel was the director of the administrative department, SS-Oberscharführer Franz Mielenz was the Rapportführer and the person responsible for prisoner work management, while SS-Hstuf Willy Jobst and SS-Hstuf Heinrich Schmitz were camp doctors. The camp's staff was subordinate to SS-WVHA, but it also was obliged to cooperate closely with the SS and police leader for the Warsaw District due to an agreement reached between the two SS institutions. The coordination was particularly strong during the pacification that happened at the turn of 1943/44, which was targeted at the Polish population of the capital.

There were three concentration camp commandants (German: Lagerkommandant) in the course of the camp's history:

- SS-Obersturmbannführer Wilhelm Göcke served until September 1943, when he was transferred to the newly created concentration camp in Kaunas in Generalbezirk Litauen;
- SS-Hauptsturmführer Nikolaus Herbet commanded the camp from September or October 1943 until his arrest in late April 1944;
- SS-Obersturmführer Friedrich Wilhelm Ruppert was appointed in May 1944 and dismissed in late June the same year.

As for the Schutzhaftlagerführer, who was simultaneously the camp director and the chief of the guards, SS-Obersturmführer Wilhelm Härtel served in this role from KL Warschau's creation until his arrest in late April 1944, while SS-Unterscharführer Heinz Villain occupied the position for the remainder of the camp's existence.

The Warsaw concentration camp usually featured SS officers who were deemed to be low-value workers. The first two commandants exhibited incompetence and little interest in the functioning of the camp. Many of the Volksdeutsche were hardly able to speak German, while some were illiterate. Corruption was rampant and extended up to the apex of the camp's hierarchy, which Andreas Mix attributes to the fact that like the senior SS officers, the kapos were Germans, therefore, the SS officers frequently made illicit agreements with them. The irregularities were so numerous that SS authorities eventually intervened. Mix suggests an escape of a Reichsdeutsche prisoner triggered this intervention.

In late April 1944, Commandant Nikolaus Herbet, Schutzhaftlagerführer Wilhelm Härtel as well as Lagerälteste (camp supervisor) Walter Wawrzyniak, were all arrested. The whole command of the camp was dissolved and almost all of its members were relieved of duty. By early May, the guards who were until then performing their duties in Warsaw were transported to Sachsenhausen and were replaced by personnel delegated from Majdanek. This scandal coincided with the degradation of the status of KL Warschau to a subcamp of Majdanek on 1 May 1944, and was thus renamed "Lublin concentration camp – Warsaw labour camp". According to some sources, it came due to deportations of prisoners to other camps as well as the advances of the Soviet army towards the territory of the General Government. Bogusław Kopka, Andreas Mix and Paweł Wieczorek write, however, that it was the corruption scandal that was the causative agent for the change in status, though, as the former two historians say, the camp's reorganisation failed to get rid of the corruption issues.

=== Prisoners ===
==== General information ====
The trait that distinguished the Warsaw concentration camp from the other ones was that, with the exception of the initial transport of 300 Germans, the inmates were uniformly Jewish. Additionally, KL Warschau only accepted prisoners who were previously in concentration camps under the jurisdiction of SS-WVHA; in contrast, it did not accept those prisoners who were to serve in concentration camps due to a decision of the Reich Security Main Office (RSHA), local Security Police outposts, or new prisoners. These were predominantly young males (under 40 years old), whom the Germans deemed to be suitable for demanding physical work. Only in the last days of the camp's existence was a group of Jewish women from the nearby Pawiak prison delivered to KL Warschau. The Nazis were trying to transport Jews from various European countries and specifically sought to exclude Polish-speaking Jews, hoping that the lack of knowledge of Polish would prevent them from communicating with the residents of Warsaw. Therefore, few Polish Jews were detained at the Warsaw concentration camp.

The first inmates, who previously were German prisoners in the Buchenwald concentration camp, arrived on 19 July 1943. Among these 300 people, 224 were professional criminals (Berufsverbrecher, or BV for short), 41 were deemed political prisoners, and 35 were considered "asocial". They became prisoner functionaries, such as kapos and Blockältester (block supervisors). Walter Wawrzyniak got hold of the chief position of camp supervisor (Lagerältester). Most of the German kapo prisoners, in particular those imprisoned as criminals, intimidated fellow Jewish inmates and acted towards them with cruelty, seeing them as expendable; though, as Gabriel Finder argues, this was not in most cases due to inherent anti-Semitism but rather due to the fact such violence granted them survival. Unlike in most other Nazi camps, Jewish kapos were absent from the camp and there is little evidence an internal hierarchy among Jewish prisoners has ever developed.

The first transport of Jewish prisoners arrived from Auschwitz-Birkenau on 31 August 1943, and three subsequent ones were made up to 27 November the same year, bringing 3,683 Jews in total, according to official data. The labourers represented Jews from various countries – the most numerous were Greek Salonican Jews, but some Austrian, Belgian, French, Dutch, German and even 50 Polish representatives of that religion (who only came because Germans had to meet 1,000 people transport quota) arrived to Warsaw as well. The ethnic composition changed substantially in spring 1944, when several trains from Auschwitz delivered c. 3,000 Hungarian Jews (most of whom originally were deported from ghettos in Mukachevo, Uzhhorod, Khust and Tiachiv, then in Hungarian-occupied Carpathian Ruthenia) who became the majority in the Warsaw concentration camp in the last months of its existence.

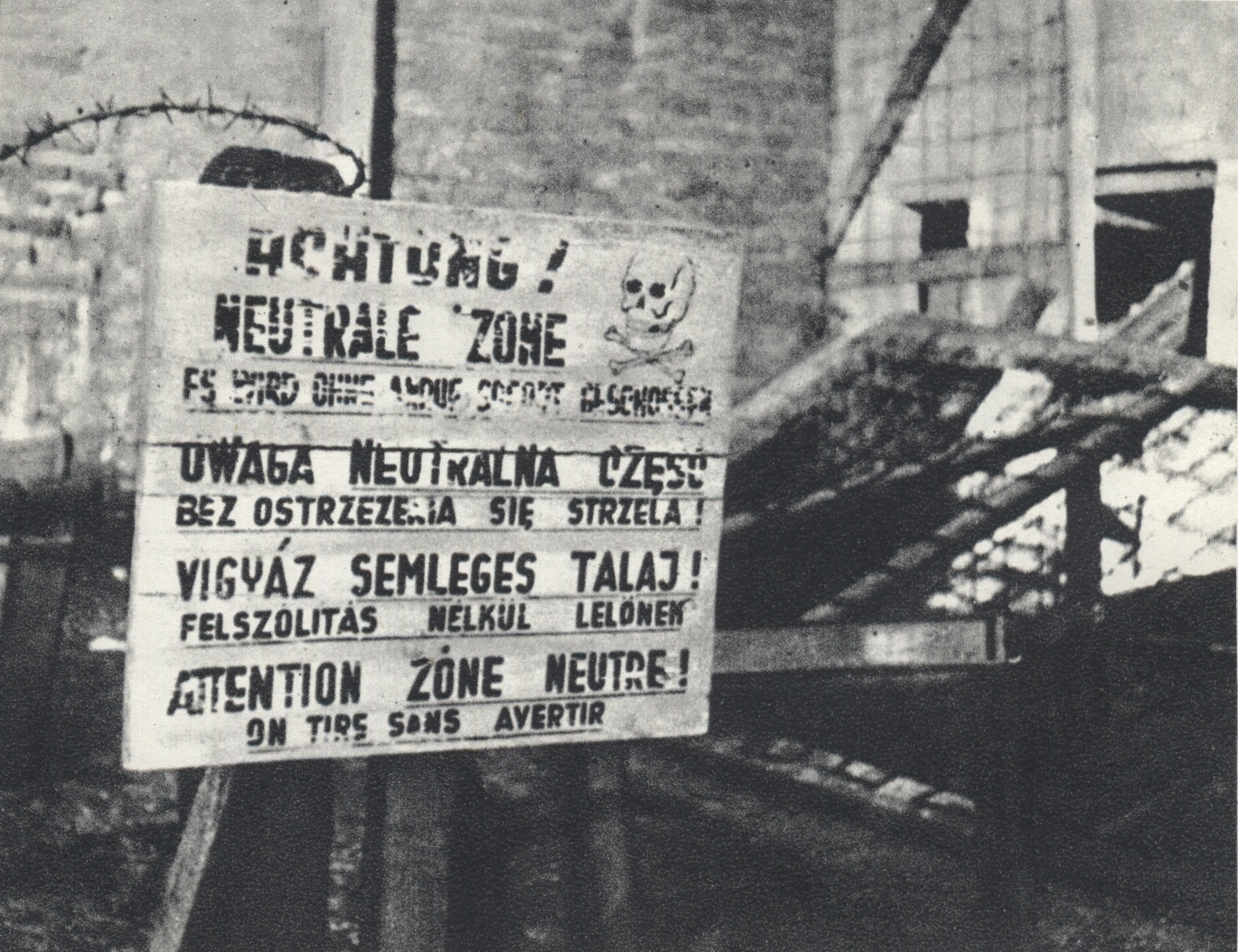
A multilingual sign saying that those who trespass the so-called "neutral zone" may be shot at without warning

The exact number of prisoners who went through KL Warschau remains difficult to ascertain, as witness and expert estimates vary from 1,500 to 40,000. As Gabriel N. Finder noted, the Warsaw concentration camp played a minor role in the Holocaust in comparison to other camps and is thus often absent from standard narratives of the period. In his entry in the Encyclopedia of Camps and Ghettos, he suggested that some 8,000–9,000 people were incarcerated there. Bogusław Kopka says in his monograph that at least 7,250 inmates went through the Warsaw concentration camp, including 300 German prisoner functionaries, about 3,700 Jews who arrived in 1943 and 3,000 Jews who came in 1944 from Auschwitz, in addition to 50 highly skilled Jews sent to the camp by the Ostbahn railway company in 1943 and 200 Jews moved from the Pawiak prison. Successful escapes were rare and Jews who were caught in the attempt were hanged in front of the assembled prisoner population.

==== Tasks ====
Prisoners were tasked with constructing the concentration camp they were residing in, demolishing the remaining ruins of the ghetto, clearing 2,640,000 m^{3} (93,000,000 ft^{3}) of rubble and with flattening the terrain at 1.20 m (3.9 ft) above the previous ground level, so as to convert the former ghetto into a park as Himmler envisaged in his order from 11 June 1943. While doing that, the workers were also ordered to salvage building materials (mainly scrap metal and bricks) for the German war effort. 10,000,000 m^{2} (110,000,000 ft^{2}) of buildings were demolished, which yielded some 8,105 tonnes of metal (of which about 7,300 tonnes of ferrous scrap metals and 805 tonnes of non-ferrous metals) and 34 million bricks. A separate search team was formed to find whatever precious items, such as money or jewellery, were left in the ruins; yet another team was working on the Umschlagplatz near Stawki street, where salvaged items were sorted and stored in warehouses. The forced labour, from the Nazi point of view, was meant to "resocialise" the prisoners.

Tatiana Berenstein and Adam Rutkowski estimate the value of the pre-war houses demolished at 220 million pre-war zlotys (i.e. slightly above US$800 million in 2021 dollars), but, according to Andreas Mix, the salvaged materials were only worth 5 million Reichsmarks, thus, with the initial investment of 150 million Reichsmark, the camp ran at steep losses.

A couple thousand Polish civilians, who were paid, also worked in the area, as did dozens of German technicians. At one period, these people, who usually handled more sophisticated tasks, such as the maintenance of demolition machines and handling explosives, outnumbered the inmates. German constructions companies, including Berlinisches Baugeschäft (Berlin), Willy Keymer (Warsaw), Merckle (Ostrów Wielkopolski), and Ostdeutscher Tiefbau (Naumburg), operated there on contract and benefitted from slave labour provided by the prisoners. The Ostbahn assisted them.

==== Conditions ====
The conditions in KL Warschau were extremely harsh. Prisoners' food rationing was meagre and hunger was common among the inmates, which was exacerbated by lack of food parcels from the outside, as these were not delivered to the camp. The shortages, however, were somewhat alleviated by the presence of Polish workers contracted to remove the ruins of the ghetto, as this was an opportunity for the inmates to clandestinely buy food for whatever valuables they could find in the ruins, and, in later days, when such items became scarce, for gold fillings extracted from their teeth. However, the gold contained there was also of interest of the SS guards, who strictly forbade removal of the teeth. They sought to enrich themselves by getting the precious metal after the death of the labourers, which they sometimes accelerated by murdering gold-toothed inmates.

The Jews were subjected to extermination through labour. The demolition and salvage work were hard and perilous labor, carried out at a brisk pace with no regard to loss of life of the prisoners, so fatal workplace incidents were commonplace. Work tools were rudimentary for the type of job the inmates were supposed to do, and there was no personal protective equipment. The guards were torturing and murdering the Jews on a whim, viewing them as enemies of the state, and prisoner functionaries, particularly criminal prisoners, were hardly better in their treatment of fellow inmates. Salonican Jews, who constituted the bulk of KL Warschau's prisoners, also had to deal with an unfamiliarly cold climate, especially problematic during often-freezing Polish winters.

Sanitation was sorely lacking to the extent that hungry and drained prisoners were decimated by outbreaks of infectious diseases, and the lack of hygiene gave way to infestations of lice and fleas. In particular, a typhus epidemic in January and February 1944 decreased the prison population by two-thirds, though the sanitary situation improved somewhat by the time the leadership was changed and the camp's construction was finished. The camp infirmary, according to Felician Loth, was "a parody of a sick ward", and patients who were unable to continue work were usually killed. For these reasons, almost 75% of original prisoners have died by March 1944, reducing the camp's population to around 1,000 inmates. This prompted the Germans to supply about 3,000 Hungarian Jews from Auschwitz.

Just as the Jews in other concentration camps, the inmates in KL Warschau were forced to wear camp uniforms and wooden clogs. The former had the Star of David badge sewn on it and a Latin letter marking the inmate's provenance. The newly arrived prisoners had their hair cut to a short length and then underwent a procedure of bathing and disinsectisation, which, before the bathhouse was built in the camp, was happening in Pawiak prison. Prisoner functionaries, however, were treated differently – they lived in a separate barrack (with the exception of the Blockältester), could wear civilian clothes, bear arms, and were even sometimes allowed to go outside the camp's premises. Jewish inmates speaking German and/or Polish also had slightly better conditions, the former because they could easily understand the guards' orders and communicate with them, while the latter could barter more efficiently with the Polish workers.

== Executions ==
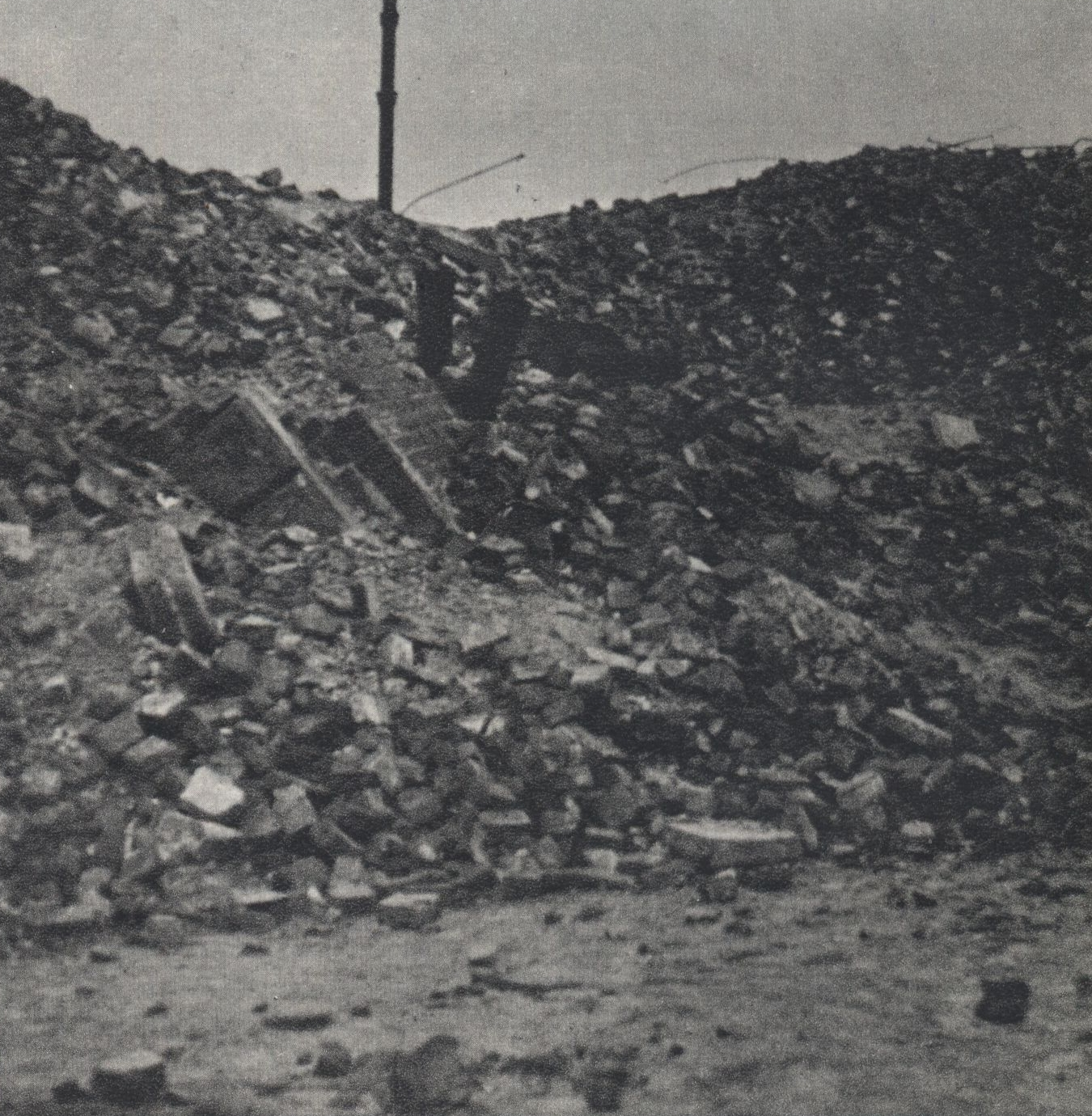
Ruins of the tenement house at 27 Dzielna Street in former Warsaw Ghetto, near Pawiak prison. This site was used as an execution spot in 1943–1944.

In 1943–1944, camp inmates, Polish Jews caught hiding on the "Aryan side" of Warsaw or in the ghetto's ruins, Polish political prisoners (Pawiak inmates) and Polish hostages captured during the street roundups (łapanki) were executed in the ruins of the former ghetto, which surrounded the camp. These executions took place almost daily and on some days, the number of victims reached dozens or even hundreds. The bodies were then burnt, first in open air pyres and later in the camp's crematorium.

The ruins of the ghetto supplanted previous execution sites, which were operating in the countryside around Warsaw, such as in Kampinos Forest (the site of the Palmiry massacre). The proximity of the Pawiak prison and the isolation of the former ghetto from the rest of the city, made them – from the German perspective – a far more suitable place for mass killings. Members of KL Warschau personnel, along with the members of other SS and Ordnungspolizei formations in Warsaw, were among the executioners. Furthermore, a special Sonderkommando, composed of the Jewish prisoners of the KL Warschau, was used to dispose the bodies of the victims. The members of that detachment were often murdered after completing the task, too.

It is impossible to determine the exact number of victims of executions in the ruins since the documents related to the camp were destroyed during its evacuation. Bogusław Kopka and Jan Żaryn estimate that some 20,000 people died as a result of the camp's activity, of which 10,000 were Poles. The number includes prisoner deaths as well as victims of executions in and around the camp, among whom were Polish political prisoners and Polish Jews caught hiding on the "Aryan side" of Warsaw or in the restricted zone of the former Warsaw Ghetto. Kopka later clarified that 10,000 people at most could have died in the camp itself. The Encyclopedia of Camps and Ghettos gives a smaller estimate of 4,000–5,000 people, counting only prisoners of KL Warschau, while Vági and Kádár suggest 3,400 to 5,000 prisoners.

== Last days ==
=== Evacuation ===
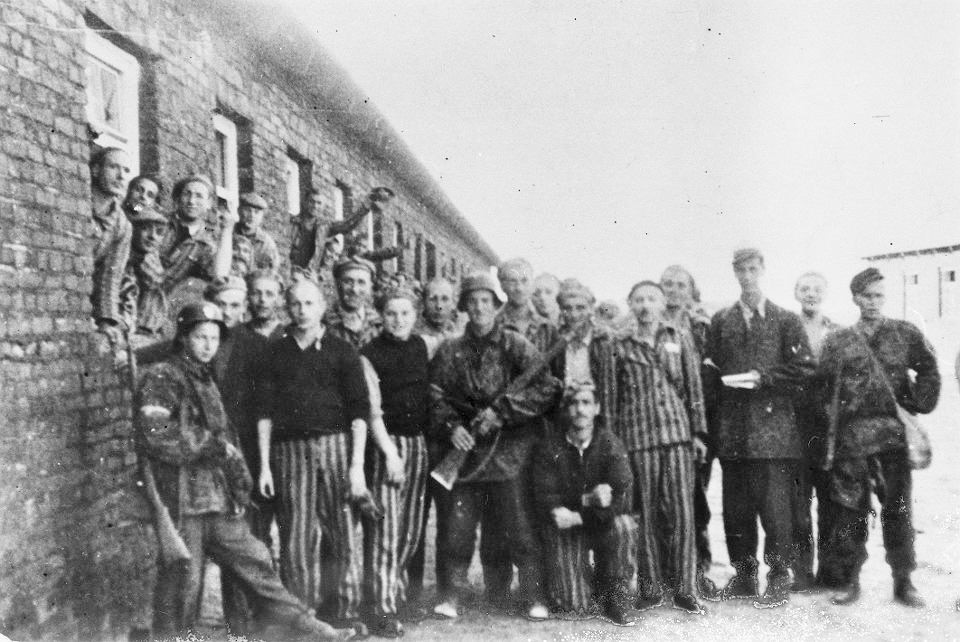
Prisoners of camp with Polish soldiers from Battalion Zośka on 5 August 1944

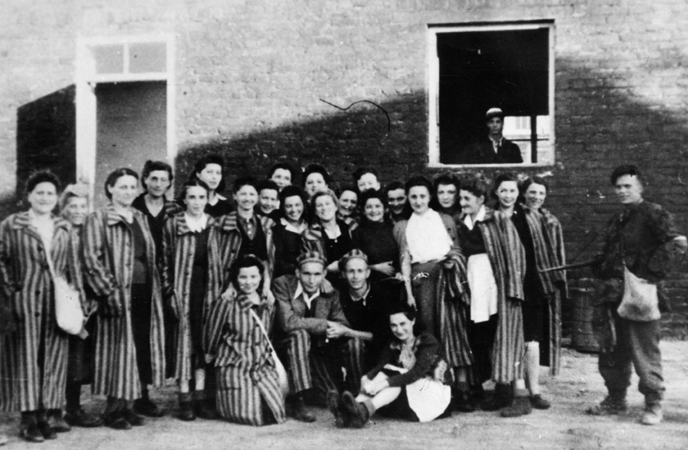
Female prisoners constituted part of the prisoner population by the end of the camp's existence. Photo taken at liberation, 5 August 1944

In summer 1944, as the Red Army was approaching, the Germans decided to evacuate the prisons and camps in Warsaw. By the end of July, Schutzhaftlagerführer Heinz Villain demanded that all prisoners who would not be able to endure a march to assemble, promising the sick and exhausted that they would be transported in horse carriages. However, on 27 July, all those who appeared on the camp director's call were shot. The same day, all patients in the camp's infirmary were also killed. In total, around 400 prisoners, including at least 180 Hungarians, died due to these actions.

The evacuation of the Warsaw concentration camp started on 28 July. About 4,500 inmates were then forced to march to Kutno, 120 km (75 mi) away, in sweltering heat. During the march, which lasted for three days, the prisoners were not given water nor food; the guards additionally murdered everyone who was unable to proceed or who was too slow to execute orders. Those who survived were loaded in freight carriages on 2 August, where poor conditions and the guards' cruelty added to the tally of dead prisoners. A total of 3,954 prisoners eventually arrived at the Dachau concentration camp on 6 August, of which there were only 280 Greek Jews who arrived at the beginning of the camp's existence. The Encyclopedia of Camps and Ghettos says that at least 500 inmates died during the operation, while Kopka gives a higher estimate of approximately 2,000 prisoners. Most of the prisoners were subsequently transported to Dachau's subcamps in Mühldorf, Kaufering and Allach-Karlsfeld, while a few were sent to Flossenbürg's subcamp in Leitmeritz (today's Litoměřice in the Czech Republic).

The Warsaw concentration camp was still operating, however. Ninety SS personnel stayed there, as did about 400 prisoners who volunteered to stay in the camp to demolish it. Among those were about 300 original prisoners as well as dozens of Jewish prisoners of Pawiak (38–100 people, including 24 women), who were moved to KL Warschau on 28 July.

=== Liberation ===
On 1 August, the Home Army (AK) started an uprising against Germans in Warsaw. In the first day of fighting, the Kedyw (sabotage command) for the Home Army District of Warsaw led by Lt. Stanisław Janusz Sosabowski "Stasinek" (son of Stanisław Sosabowski) captured Waffen-SS warehouses on Stawki street (Umschlagplatz) and a school on nearby Niska street, setting free around 50 KL Warschau prisoners who were working there. By that time, the Home Army also partially controlled the area of "the new camp", located near Okopowa street. In light of these advances by AK, the concentration camp's staff and the prisoners retreated to the fortified defence positions in "the old camp".

In the following few days, the patrol of the insurgent forces made several incursions into KL Warschau, with little success. Meanwhile, Cpt. Jan Kajus Andrzejewski "Jan", head of the Diversionary Brigade Broda 53, asked his superior, Lt. Col. Jan Mazurkiewicz "Radosław", to storm the buildings of Gęsiówka. Control over the concentration camp's area was important from a tactical standpoint, as the Home Army could gain control over the road leading to the Old Town via the ghetto's ruins, while also serving a humanitarian purpose of liberating the prisoners, who could be murdered. "Radosław" eventually agreed, and according to the plan, scout Battalion Zośka was handed the task of capturing the concentration camp's premises.

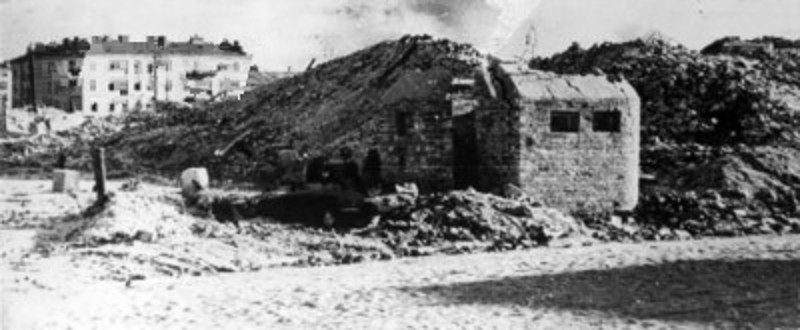
A bunker of the concentration camp near Okopowa street, destroyed by Battalion Zośka. Photo taken in 1945

KL Warschau was attacked on 5 August at 10:00, when Ryszard Białous "Jerzy", Zośka's commander, and Wacław Micuta, who commanded one of its platoons, started the offensive. The military advantage was on the Polish side due to their prior capture and usage of a Panther tank, which destroyed the camp's watchtowers and bunkers. German defenders were stunned by the attack from what they assumed was a friendly unit. The German defence eventually collapsed and SS personnel hid in the Pawiak prison walls. Battalion Zośka's losses were rather small – one person was killed in action, another died of wounds and one person was wounded in action but survived; German losses are unknown but were presumably larger. The Home Army thus liberated 348 Jews, among which 24 were women. Those released were mostly Hungarian (200–250 people) and Greek Jews, with some Czechoslovaks and Dutch Jews, who knew very little Polish. It is known that only 89 people among the liberated had been Polish citizens, and historians have only been able to identify 73 prisoners by name. The Warsaw concentration camp was the only German concentration camp in Poland that was not liberated by main Allied troops, but by resistance fighters. (Note: Another camp liberated by partisan forces was the one in Holýšov, a branch of the Flossenbürg concentration camp. This was done, with consent of the US Army, by the NSZ's Holy Cross Mountains Brigade on 5 May 1945, days before World War II ended in Europe.)

The vast majority of released Jewish prisoners swiftly took part in the uprising, which Gabriel Finder attributes to an informal political group which that prevented the camp's inhabitants from moral deterioration. Some of them were fighting along with other soldiers, but most, given their lack of combat experience, were helping with logistical issues, rescuing those under ruins as well as extinguishing fires. Morale among Jewish fighters was hurt by displays of antisemitism, with several former Jewish prisoners in combat units killed by antisemitic Poles, in particular those associated with the National Armed Forces. After the defeat of the uprising, the survivors fled or hid in bunkers. There were as few as 200 Jewish survivors (former prisoners as well as Jews who were hiding on the "Aryan" side) on 17 January 1945, on which date the Red Army entered Warsaw.

== Postwar ==
After the retreat of the German forces from Warsaw, the former Nazi camp was first operated by the Soviet NKVD for German prisoners of war, as well as for the soldiers of the Home Army loyal to the Polish government-in-exile and other persons suspected of opposing the Soviet occupation. As in the case for the German period, the prisoners were held in poor conditions and it is probable that numerous executions were taking place in the camp.

The camp was then turned over to the Polish Ministry of Public Security (MBP) in mid-1945, when it became known as the Central Labour Camp for Warsaw's Reconstruction (Centralny Obóz Pracy dla Odbudowy Warszawy). Its prisoners were used for construction and demolition works in the capital. Most of the prisoners of war were released in 1948 and 1949, and in November 1949 the labour camp was converted to a prison. The facility, which became known under two names: Central Prison – Labour Centre in Warsaw (Centralne Więzienie – Ośrodek Pracy w Warszawie) or Central Prison Warsaw II Gęsiówka (Centralne Więzienie Warszawa II Gęsiówka), did not de facto change its purpose. The inmates were still producing building materials for Warsaw's reconstruction, and Gęsiówka still used forced labour, but instead of prisoners of war, common criminals and people accused by the Special Commission for Fighting Abuse and Economic Sabotage of economic wrongdoings were sent there. According to Bogusław Kopka, 1,800 people died in the postwar prison; though an estimate of 1,180 victims also appears in the literature. The fact that the former Nazi camp was taken and run by the communist authorities was the main reason why the Chief Commission for the Investigation of German Crimes in Poland ceased its investigation in 1947.

The prison was closed in 1956 and was demolished in 1965. No element of the Nazi camp was preserved. As of 2023, the site is occupied by a garden square, residential buildings, and the building of the POLIN Museum of the History of Polish Jews.

== Inquiries ==
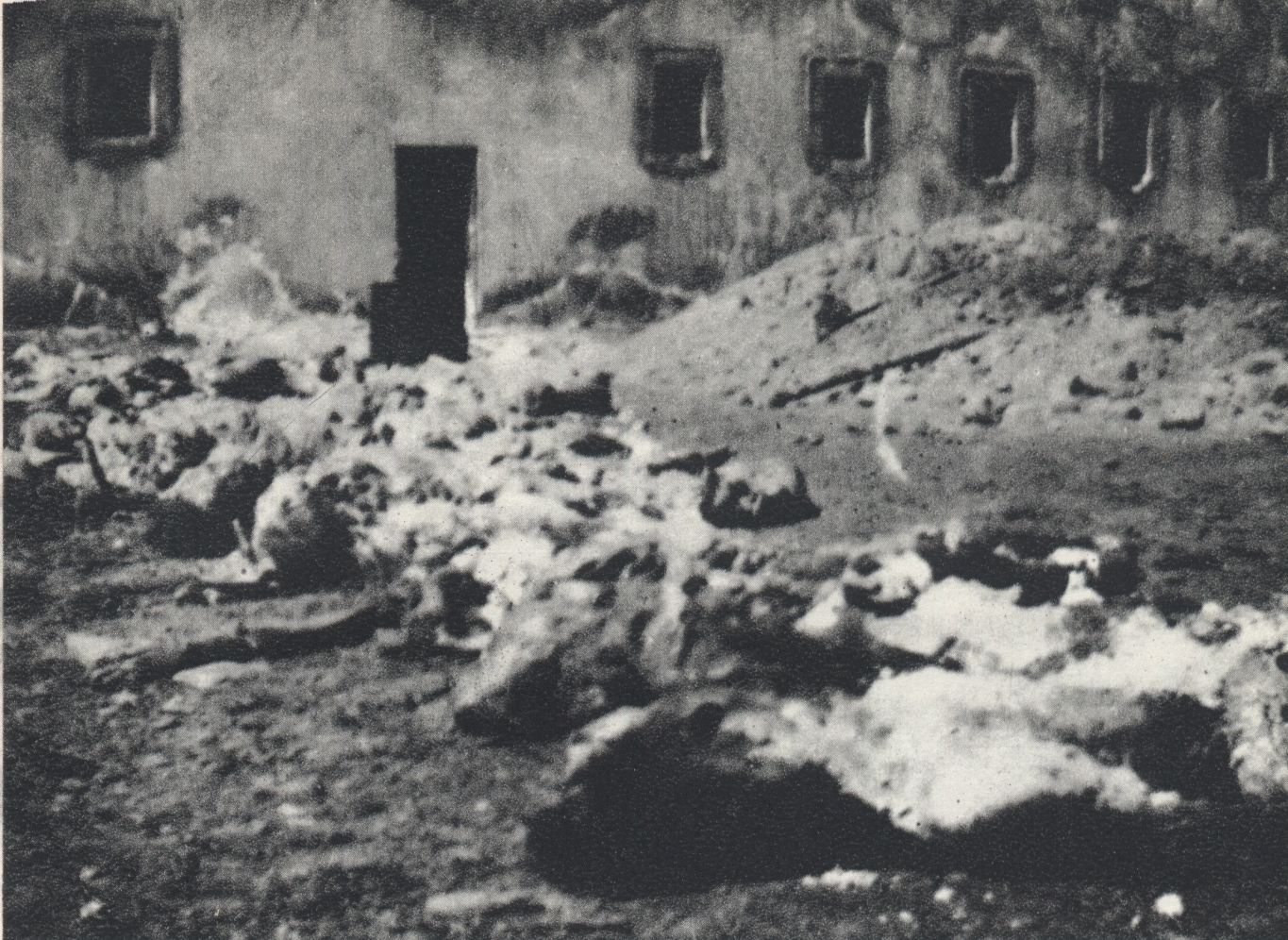
Exhumed bodies in Gęsiówka prison courtyard, part of Polish government's September 1946 inquiry into crimes committed in the camp

It did not take long for the newly established Communist government in Poland to start analysing the events that happened in the camp's history. Already in May 1945, the Warsaw Circuit Commission for the Investigation of German Crimes in Poland launched a formal inquiry into the crimes committed in Warsaw concentration camp. Prosecutors inspected the premises several times, which yielded rich photographic documentation of the camp's buildings. On 15–25 September 1946, a total of 2180 kg of human corpses was exhumed and analysed (the corpses were then buried again in Wola Cemetery); however, the exhumations did not cover the whole territory of the camp.

In 1947, the inquiry was halted for the first time due to political considerations, as the former concentration camp came under the jurisdiction of the Communist Ministry of Public Security. It was only in 1974 that the investigation was continued on the request of the Central Office of the State Justice Administrations for the Investigation of National Socialist Crimes in Ludwigsburg, Germany; however, after two years, it was again suspended as the prosecutors deemed it impossible to retrieve more evidence in Poland. The investigation was once again opened in 1986, only to be closed in 1996 due to the unavailability of the perpetrators for interrogation (who either went missing or were already dead). A parallel inquiry by German federal officials was also closed.

The topic of the camp returned to prominence in early 2000s, not least due to the July 2001 Sejm resolution commemorating the victims of the concentration camp, so the Regional Prosecutor's Office in Warsaw decided to open the Warsaw concentration camp case once again in 2002. The case was first managed by the Institute of National Remembrance's District Commission in Warsaw, then it was transferred to Łódź, but was promptly returned to the capital. On 23 January 2017, the case was closed for the fourth time.

=== Criminal responsibility of perpetrators ===
Following Allied victory in World War II, some people related to the Warsaw concentration camp's history were convicted in criminal or military courts.

- 53 SS officers and prisoner functionaries were convicted by the judiciary of the Polish People's Republic, who in most cases received relatively light sentences. Five SS officers from the camp were executed for their role in administering KL Warschau; seven died in prison and the rest was released in 1956 at the latest.
- Some members of KL Warschau staff were convicted in Dachau trials in the American zone of Allied-occupied Germany. Wilhelm Ruppert, Alfred Kramer and Franz Mielenz, for instance, received death penalties in the Dachau camp trial (Ruppert and Kramer were executed in 1946, while Mielenz died in prison); Willy Jobst, the camp doctor, also received capital punishment and was hanged in 1947, though he was indicted in a different trial, which concerned the Mauthausen-Gusen camp.
- Walter Wawrzyniak, who was a prisoner functionary, was also sentenced to death for his activities in KL Warschau in an East German court in 1950, but this was reduced to life imprisonment on appeal.
- Heinz Villain, whom Bogusław Kopka described as among the most cruel staff members of KL Warschau, was ultimately convicted in the Third Majdanek Trial. In 1981, a court in Düsseldorf in West Germany gave him a 6-year prison term.

Additionally, Theodor Szehinskyj, a former guard who immigrated to the US in the 1950s, had his US citizenship revoked as a federal court in Pennsylvania found in July 2000 that he had lied in his initial visa application about his past in the SS Totenkopf Division, including in the Warsaw concentration camp; the decision was upheld on appeal to the 3rd Circuit. Jürgen Stroop's trial in 1950 also included significant evidence relating to the concentration camp (Stroop was hanged in Warsaw in 1952).

Most of the staff of KL Warschau, however, did not face consequences for the war crimes. In particular, the whereabouts of Nicolaus Herbet, the second commandant of the camp, as well as Schutzhaftlagerführer Wilhelm Härtel remained unknown. The Institute of National Remembrance's (IPN) prosecutors inquired about 208 people whom it identified to be staff members of the concentration camp in 2014, but the Ludwigsburg office only sent information about a fraction of them because of staffing issues related to processing the request of this breadth. In January 2017, IPN's prosecutors speculated that some SS officers involved in KL Warschau might be still alive, but decided to discontinue the investigation due to the fact the prosecutors had no confirmation of this.

== Discredited extermination camp story ==
=== Hypothesis ===
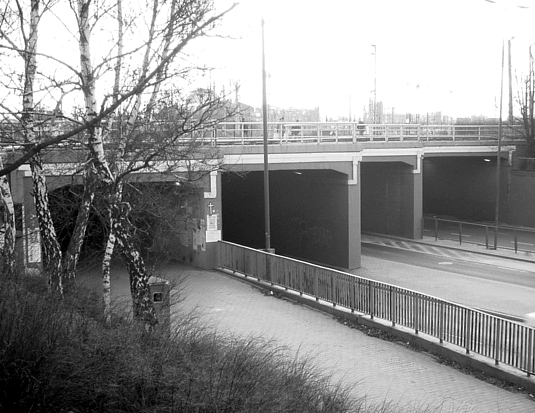
Tunnels near Warsaw West rail and bus station. The second tunnel from the left supposedly housed a German gas chamber used to exterminate ethnic Poles.

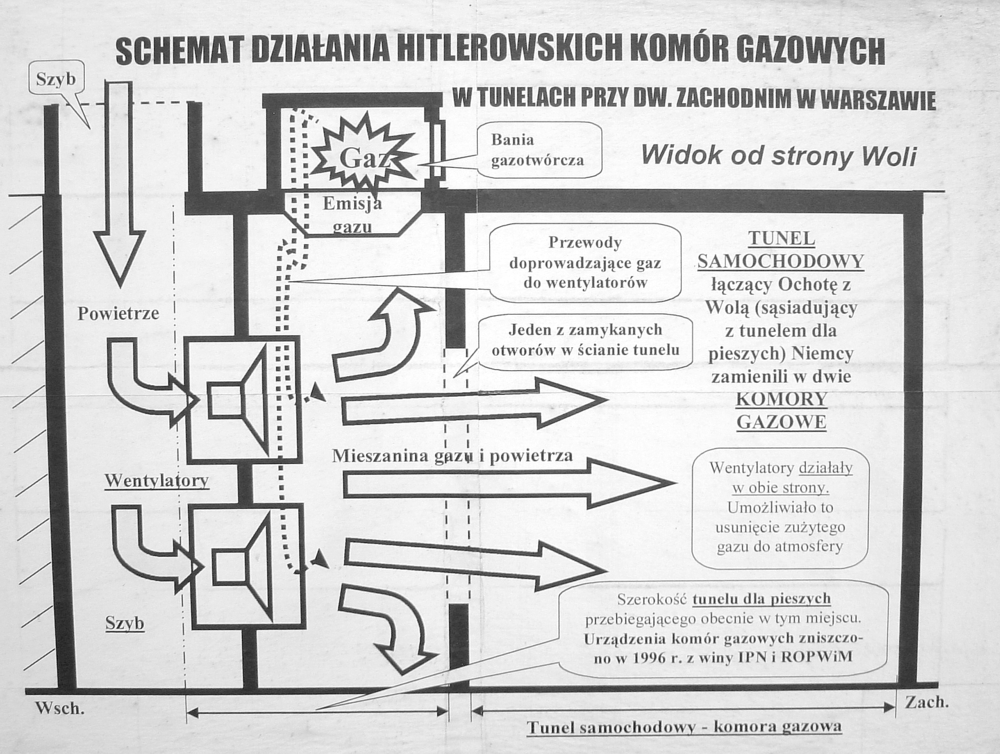
A purported scheme, in Polish, of the gas chamber in the tunnels near Warszawa Zachodnia station. (Note: According to the scheme, a ventilation shaft, which was located closer to the railway station and is seen on the left of the scheme, pumped in air from the outside. In the meantime, hydrogen cyanide gas appearing from Zyklon B was transported by two pipes to the ventilators, where the gas was mixed with air, and then blown into the tunnel via vents in its walls that could be closed. These were the two gas chambers that Trzcińska alleged to have existed. The gas was then pumped out of the gas chambers by the ventilator engines and released into the atmosphere. The scheme says that the Institute of National Remembrance and the Council for the Protection of Struggle and Martyrdom Sites are to blame for the destruction of what is said to be the remnants of the gas chamber infrastructure in 1996.)

Despite the availability of reliable information about the Warsaw concentration camp, in the 1980s a since-discredited legend or conspiracy theory developed concerning the camp. Maria Trzcińska, a Polish judge who served in 1974–1996 as a member of the Chief Commission for Investigation of Hitlerite Crimes in Poland (named Chief Commission for Investigation of Crimes against the Polish Nation after 1991), was assigned to investigate German documents that her counterparts in Ludwigsburg had found. In mid-1988, testimony began to emerge suggesting that the concentration camp was also located near Warszawa Zachodnia railway station, more than 3 km (1.9 mi) away from Gęsia Street, and included gas chambers. These witnesses said that other camps had also existed in the vicinity of the camp's generally recognised area. The earliest mention of the gas chambers appeared in the early 1970s in an issue of Perspektywy, a Polish weekly political magazine discontinued in 1990.

Thereafter Trzcińska advocated commemoration of the concentration camp's victims, based on the testimony from the late 1980s. In 2002 Trzcińska published a book, Obóz zagłady w centrum Warszawy. Konzentrationslager Warschau (The Extermination Camp in the Centre of Warsaw: Konzentrazionslager Warschau). According to Jan Żaryn, when the idea of a monument to the victims of the Warsaw concentration camp approached fruition, the interested parties were unable to agree on inscriptions to be placed on it, so Trzcińska requested that the IPN verify which version was correct. The institute's conclusions, published in a book by Bogusław Kopka, however, diverged so strongly from hers that she retracted her section of the book and independently published her own conclusions, reiterating the points she had made five years before. (Note: This English Wikipedia article was created in 2004 and for 15 years presented Trzcińska's extermination-camp story as fact, despite it having been discredited by 2007. The story was removed in August 2019 and drew media attention in October 2019, when Omer Benjakob of Haaretz called it "Wikipedia's longest-standing hoax".) Her contentions can be summarised as follows:

- KL Warschau started its operation in October 1942, just after Himmler's first order (see Creation section);
- The Warsaw concentration camp was an extensive complex consisting of five subcamps. The main camp, which purportedly had previously served as a POW camp for the Polish Army soldiers detained after September 1939, was located in a small forest called Lasek na Kole; two subcamps were located in the former ghetto (one on Gęsia street, which is the generally recognised location, and another on Bonifraterska street); and two were located near the Warszawa Zachodnia station. (Note: According to her theory, the subcamps near Warszawa Zachodnia station were to be located on both sides of the tunnel supposedly containing a giant gas chamber. One of them supposedly had an area of about 30 hectares (74 acres) and was situated between Mszczonowska, Armatnia and Józef Bem streets; the other was located on the other side of the railway tracks, near what was then Skalmierzycka street (today's part of Jerusalem Avenue running from Niemcewicza street to the road tunnel).) These are said to have extended over an area of around 120 hectares (300 acres), containing 119 barracks capable of housing 41,000 inmates.
- KL Warschau operated as an extermination camp for Poles. 200,000 people, mostly ethnic Poles, supposedly died by gassing and mass shootings. A road tunnel under the railway line, which is today part of Aleja Prymasa Tysiąclecia (then part of Józef Bem Street), was allegedly converted into a gas chamber, which plays a central part in her extermination story.
- The Polish People's Republic authorities were unwilling to investigate the Warsaw concentration camp or commemorate its victims as they were afraid of disclosing the information about activities of the Soviet NKVD and Polish Communist MBP on its premises.

=== Refutation ===
These contentions, in addition to not being confirmed by Bogusław Kopka, have also been refuted by the IPN in a later analysis by Zygmunt Walkowski. The findings were also cast in doubt by other historians, including Władysław Bartoszewski, Tomasz Szarota, Andreas Mix, Jan Żaryn and Martyna Grądzka-Rejak. In particular, they say that:

- no credible evidence exists for the assertion that KL Warschau had more camps than the one at Gęsia street. There is no testimony whatsoever about the existence of the camp at Bonifraterska street; as for three other camps which supposedly existed, available testimony is scarce, is contradictory and contains few details. There is also no evidence for a POW camp in Koło neighbourhood that had allegedly existed before KL Warschau, or in general of any spatially separated camps;
- there is no credible evidence for the hypothesis that KL Warschau was an extermination camp, or that it featured a giant gas chamber under the railway tracks. Neither the Polish Underground State reports nor the German archives reveal any such information, nor did any piece of testimony coming from wartime period or shortly thereafter mention it. The oral and written submissions Trzcińska relied on were created more than 40 years after the war, and their veracity is dubious. Moreover, retired workers of "Kolprojekt", a rail construction bureau, and available documents of the enterprise suggest that the ventilation shafts near Józef Bem Street, which supposedly were remnants of the gas chamber, were in fact built in the 1970s and that in 1960, the technical plan of Warszawa Zachodnia station did not have any gas chambers detected;
- known estimates of the losses Warsaw endured in World War II contradict the notion that 200,000 people could have died in the Warsaw concentration camp. Bogusław Kopka suggested that this number is in fact a sum of those who died in the Warsaw Uprising, the deaths in the camps and some other civilian deaths in Warsaw.

External videos
- Zygmunt Walkowski's lecture about aerial photography of the Warsaw concentration camp (in Polish; 1h 40m 22s)

In 2010, the Institute of National Remembrance commissioned a report from historian and aerial photography expert Zygmunt Walkowski, which was submitted in December 2016 (it is not yet published as of August 2022). The report confirmed that the only place KL Warschau existed on was on Gęsia Street and that no camp infrastructure existed in the areas said to have contained other subcamps. Walkowski also noted that the tunnels were not closed and that vehicles could drive through them, while the two ventilation shafts and a ventilator engine that were supposedly used to pump Zyklon B into the tunnel were only built in the 1970s. It was also shown that during the German occupation, access to the forest near Koło was not restricted for civilians, the barracks were already built in the 1930s and were used by civilians, while the purported "death wall" only emerged in 1972.

=== Reactions ===
According to Christian Davies, the discredited story that the Germans built a gas chamber to kill non-Jews, together with the fact of some 200,000 Polish fatalities in the 1944 Warsaw Uprising (for a total of 400,000 non-Jewish deaths in Warsaw, which is also the usual estimate of the number of Jews imprisoned in Warsaw), has been used by the story's advocates to seek parity between Jewish and non-Jewish victimhood that would make the Holocaust seem less unique, a notion that Davies dubbed the "Polocaust". He also pointed to Law and Justice party (PiS) officials' endorsement for Mira Modelska-Creech, who emerged as one of the main proponents of the extermination camp hypothesis after Trzcińska died in 2011, (Note: For publications advocating Trzcińska's thesis since she died in 2011, see: Zaorska, Aldona (2013). KL Warschau. Historia obozu zagłady w Warszawie [KL Warschau. History of an extermination camp in Warsaw] (in Polish). Warsaw: Bollinari Publishing House. ISBN 978-83-63865-48-1. OCLC 855590248.; Bojarski, Włodzimierz Witold, ed. (2014). Plan zagłady Warszawy: KL Warschau [Plan of Warsaw's extermination: KL Warschau]. Warszawa: Wydawnictwo "Myślę Ojczyzna". ISBN 978-83-939232-2-9. OCLC 924728007.; Modelska-Creech, Mira (2015). KL Warschau: to miała być zbrodnia doskonała... [KL Warschau: it was supposed to be a perfect crime...]. Warsaw: Wydawnictwo Instytutu Teologicznego Księży Misjonarzy. ISBN 978-83-7869-226-3. OCLC 939908797.) and IPN's lack of reaction when the commemorative plaque citing Trzcińska's data was unveiled in 2017. Nasz Dziennik, a right-wing to far-right Catholic newspaper, and affiliated Radio Maryja, have promoted the hypothesis as an emblem of Polish martyrdom. These media outlets have also advocated for introducing the story into school curricula and for constructing a museum of KL Warschau.

In 2001, Bartoszewski dismissed the gas chamber theory as being propagated among those "who think that too few people have died in Warsaw". Havi Dreifuss, Jan Grabowski, and Gideon Greif have related the gas-chamber story to the current Polish government's history policy and interpreted the account as a conspiracy theory (Grabowski) or fake history (Dreifuss). Walkowski, who said he was bemused by the fact that people were unhappy with his findings about fewer deaths, told reporters he had received threats. Historian Daniel Blatman, on the other hand, while seeing the hypothesis as "one of numberless stories that Holocaust deniers around the world are posting online", warned against generalising on the Polish society or the governments it brought to power.

== Commemoration ==
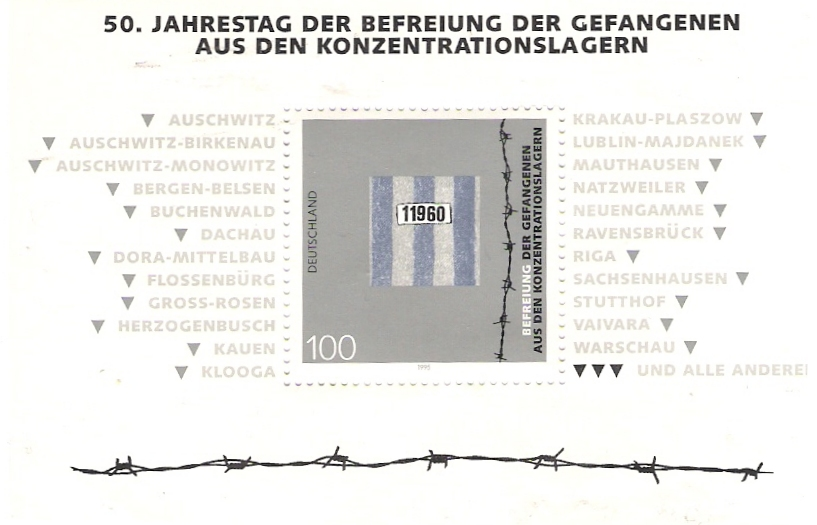
A 1995 German post stamp, mentioning the Warsaw concentration camp

Probably in the 1950s, a Tchorek plaque, which said that "in 1943–1944, Polish patriots were repeatedly shot to death and burnt by the Hitlerites in this building", was installed on a wall of the burnt-out Wołyń Caserns, specifically on the east wall, facing Zamenhof Street. The plaque was lost in 1965, when Gęsiówka was demolished. Bogusław Kopka says, though, that during his visit to Warsaw in 1959, Richard Nixon, then Vice President of the United States, managed to lay a wreath in front of the main building of the former concentration camp.

Commemoration efforts were renewed in July 2001, when the Sejm, the lower house of the Polish parliament, adopted a resolution commemorating the victims of the concentration camp while calling to create a monument "in remembrance of thousands of Polish inhabitants of Warsaw who were murdered in the Warsaw concentration camp as part of the plan of annihilating the Capital City of Poland, as well as murdered citizens of other nationalities: Jews, Greeks, Gypsies, Belarusians and Italian officers".

In March 2004, the Warsaw city council allowed to build a commemoration site on the Alojzy Pawelek square in the southern part of Wola district, next to what Trzcińska contended were gas chambers and subcamps of KL Warschau. It became a place of informal monthly gatherings of supporters of Trzcińska's hypothesis. Despite the fact that relevant authorities consider the monument an illegal building and do not cover it by protection afforded to other monuments as it cites false historical data, the monument still stands.

The resolution that initially allowed the monument's construction was cancelled in October 2009 after consultations with the Council for the Protection of Struggle and Martyrdom Sites, a governmental body responsible for the preservation of sites of wartime persecution, and it was decided to place a new monument in the neighbourhood of Muranów, on the site of what was then Serbia prison, some 200 m (660 ft) away from the walls of the actual concentration camp. (Note: As of March 2022, the monument in Muranów has not yet appeared.) That decision was opposed by supporters of Trzcińska's hypothesis, who argued that placing the monument there would suggest that only Jews were victims of the concentration camp, but the Supreme Administrative Court denied their request to invalidate the new resolution.

Supporters of the extermination camp theory have created their own commemoration sites. Their efforts have resulted in the 2004 monument, a plaque on a nearby church on Józef Bem Street, placed in 2009 and consecrated by Archbishop Kazimierz Nycz, and another two in 2017, one on a church in the Warsaw district of Praga-Południe and its copy in the Jasna Góra Monastery in Częstochowa; all of these are repeating Trzcińska's conjecture about 200,000 Poles murdered in the Warsaw concentration camp. An unofficial plaque was also installed in the Lasek na Kole forest, contending that a place of execution connected with the Warsaw concentration camp existed there. Marius Gudonis and Benjamin T. Jones, in their book History in a Post-Truth World, relate the fact such plaques appeared to the indifference to established facts and to an ideological devotion to the preferred historical narrative, which, in the case of the 2009 plaque, was further cemented by approval of high church authorities.

As a result, the only place of commemoration of the Warsaw concentration camp in the area of KL Warschau is a plaque that was initially embedded into a wall of a building at 34 Anielewicza Street in 1994; it was moved in 2018 and is now located on the corner of Anielewicza and Okopowa Streets, which was the south-west corner of KL Warschau. The plaques, written in Polish, Hebrew and English tell about the camp's liberation by Battalion Zośka and the subsequent participation of the prisoners in the Warsaw Uprising. A plaque in remembrance of the victims was also unveiled near the Museum of Pawiak Prison in November 2013.

The camp's name appears on the 1995 German post stamp, prepared for the 50th anniversary of the liberation of prisoners from Nazi concentration camps. In 2020, a 10 PLN silver commemorative coin was issued by the National Bank of Poland, honouring the camp's victims.

Commemoration of the Warsaw concentration camp

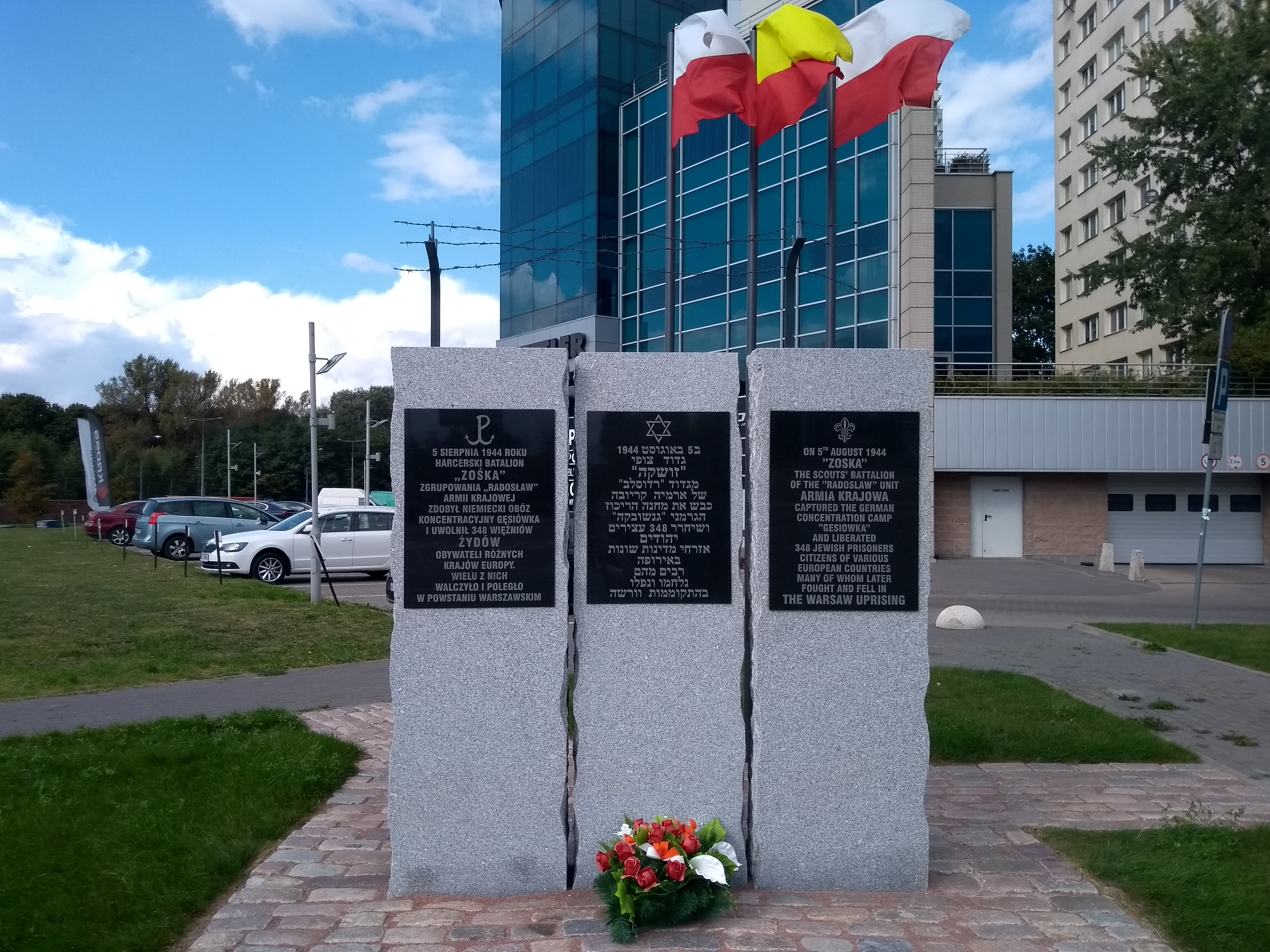
Official commemorative site of the Warsaw concentration camp, on the corner of Anielewicza and Okopowa street, near the camp's south-west corner.

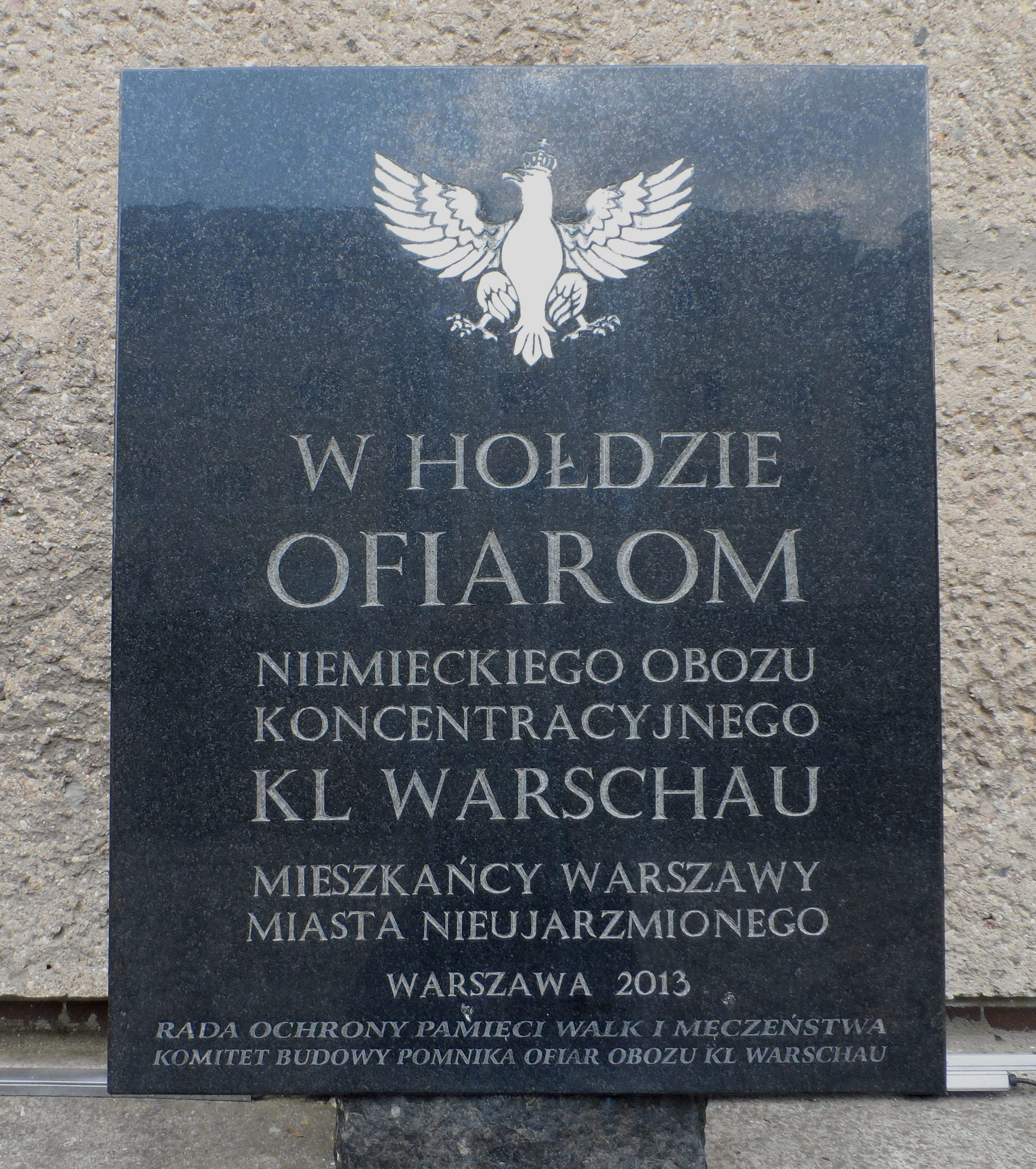
Commemorative plaque near Pawiak Prison

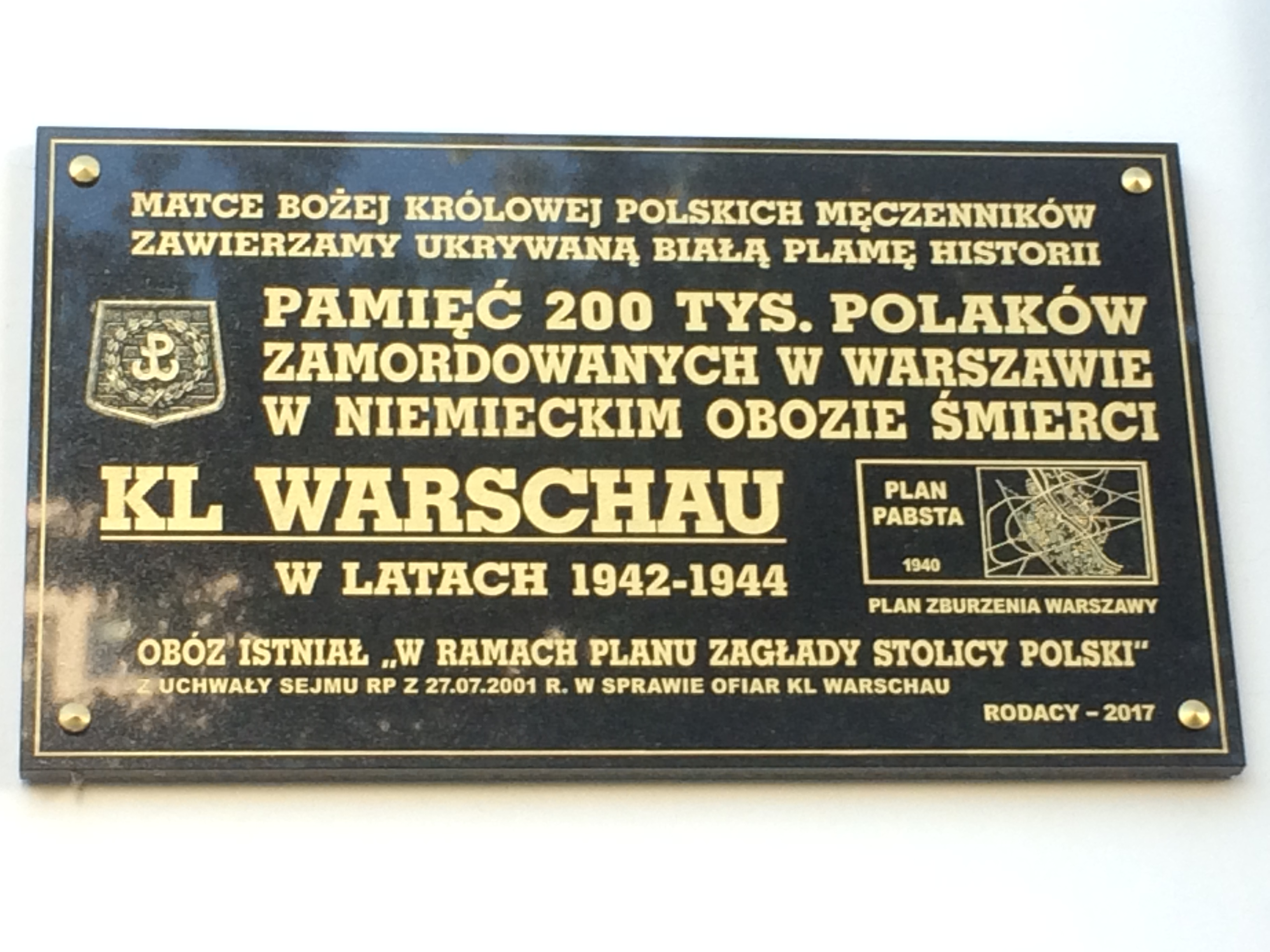
Commemorative plaque placed in Warsaw in 2017, contending that 200,000 Poles were murdered in KL Warschau, which it says was "a white blot of history that was being hidden". Its copy was placed in Częstochowa

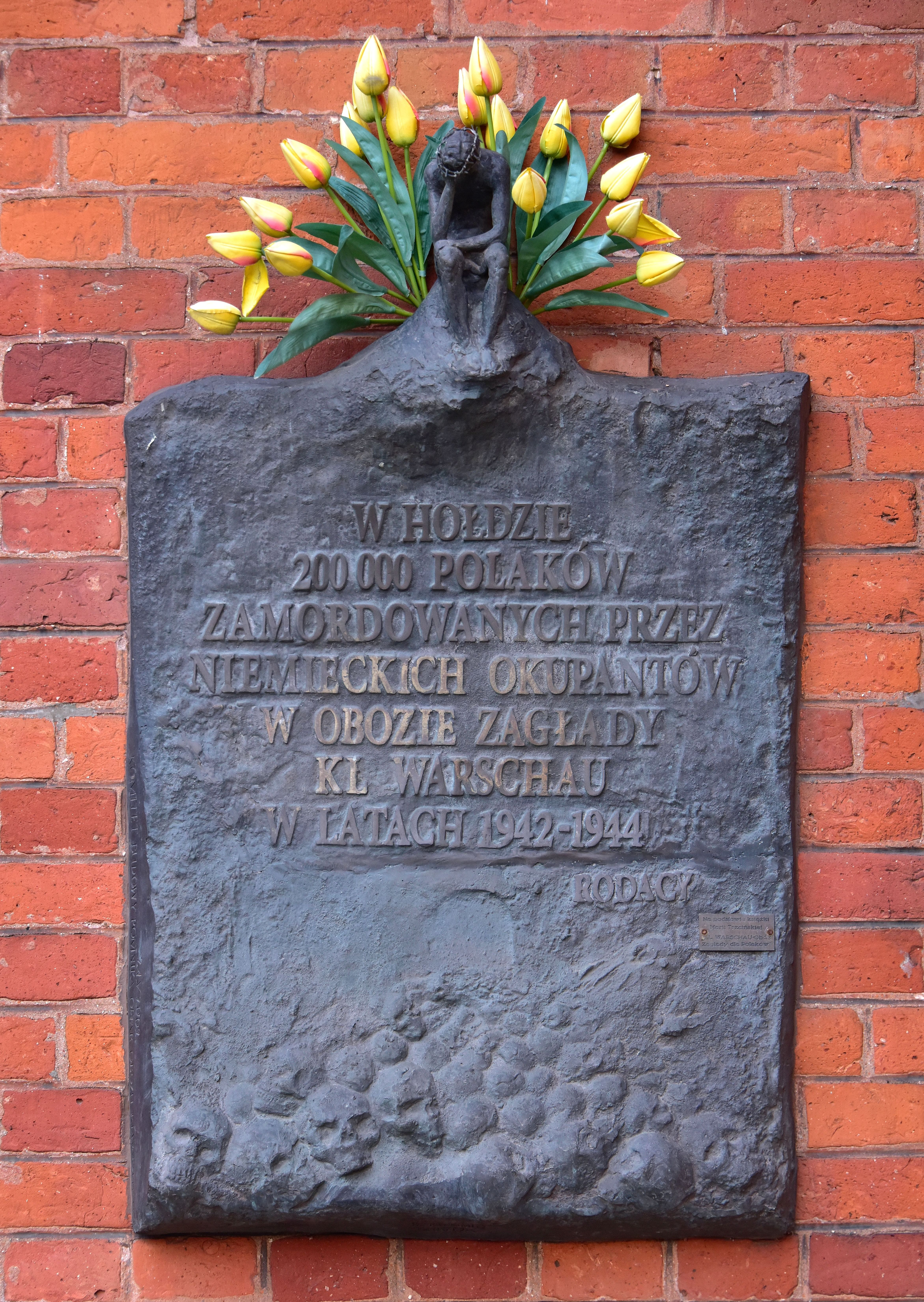
Another commemorative plaque citing the same number

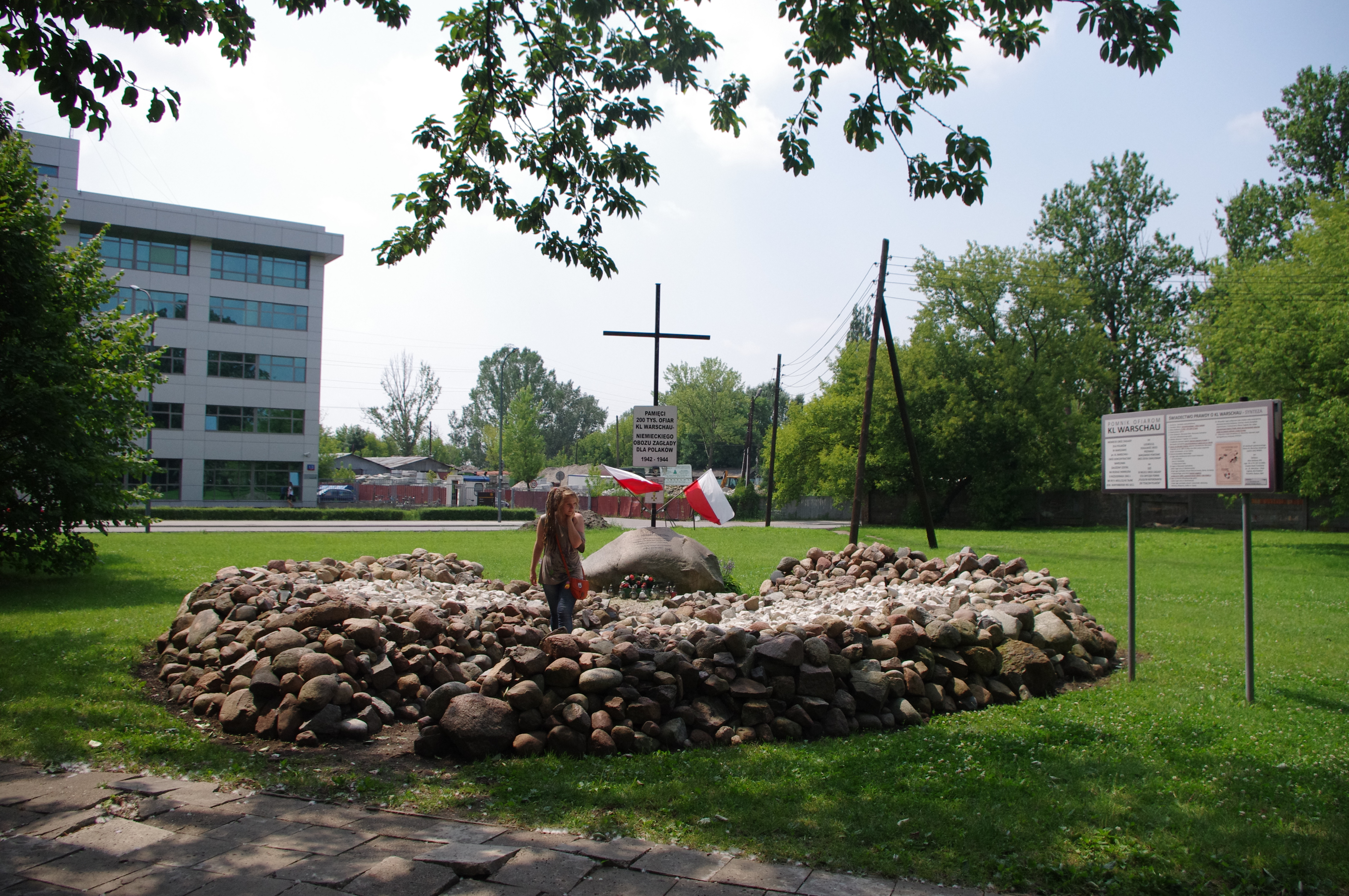
Commemoration site for the Warsaw concentration camp on Alojzy Pawelek square, an unofficial gathering place of Trzcińska's supporters. Photo taken in 2012

== Bibliography ==
- Bartoszewski, Władysław (1970). Warszawski pierścień śmierci 1939–1944 [Warsaw Ring of Death 1939-1944] (in Polish). Warszawa: Interpress.
- Berenstein, Tatiana; Rutkowski, Adam (1967). "Obóz koncentracyjny dla Żydów w Warszawie (1943-1944)" [A concentration camp for the Jews in Warsaw (1943-1944)]. Bulletin of the Jewish Historical Institute (in Polish). pp. 3–22. Archived from the original on 1 November 2021 – via Central Jewish Library.
- Borkiewicz-Celińska, Anna (1990). Batalion "Zośka" [Battalion Zośka] (in Polish). Warsaw: Państwowy Instytut Wydawniczy. ISBN 83-06-01851-6.
- Domańska, Regina (1978). Pawiak – więzienie Gestapo. Kronika lat 1939–1944 [Pawiak – the prison of Gestapo. Chronography of 1939-1944] (in Polish). Warsaw: Książka i Wiedza.
- Engelking, Barbara; Leociak, Jacek (2013). Getto warszawskie. Przewodnik po nieistniejącym mieście [Warsaw Ghetto. A guide to a non-existent city] (in Polish). Warsaw: Stowarzyszenie Centrum Badań nad Zagładą Żydów. ISBN 978-83-63444-27-3.
- Kopka, Bogusław (2007). Konzentrationslager Warschau. Historia i następstwa [Konzentrationslager Warschau. History and consequences] (in Polish). Warsaw: Institute of National Remembrance. ISBN 978-83-60464-46-5.
- Kopka, Bogusław (2019). Gułag nad Wisłą. Komunistyczne obozy pracy w Polsce 1944–1956 [GULag on the Vistula. Communist forced labour camps in Poland in 1944-1956] (in Polish). Kraków: Wydawnictwo Literackie. ISBN 978-83-08-06753-6.
- Longerich, Peter (2011). Heinrich Himmler: A Life. New York: Oxford University Press. ISBN 9780199592326.
- Łuszczyna, Marek (2017). "Antifa, czyli punkt widzenia Heinza Grischke". Mała zbrodnia: Polskie obozy koncentracyjne (in Polish). Warsaw: Znak-Horyzont. ISBN 978-83-240-4175-6.
- Mix, Andreas (2008). "Warschau-Stammlager". In Benz, Wolfgang; Distel, Barbara (eds.). Der Ort des Terrors. Geschichte der nationalsozialistischen Konzentrationslager (in German). Vol. 8. Munich: C.H.BECK. ISBN 978-3-406-57237-1.
- Salter, Michael (11 June 2007). Nazi War Crimes, US Intelligence and Selective Prosecution at Nuremberg: Controversies Regarding the Role of the Office of Strategic Services. Routledge. ISBN 978-1-135-33133-7.
- Stroop, Jürgen (1943). The Warsaw Ghetto is no more. New Haven: Yale Law School Lillian Goodman Law Library. ISBN 978-83-7629-455-1.
- Szarota, Tomasz (2014). "Konzentrationslager Warschau". In Komorowski, Krzysztof (ed.). Warszawa walczy 1939–1945. Leksykon [Warsaw fights 1939-1945. A dictionary] (in Polish). Warsaw: Fundacja Warszawa Walczy 1939–1945/Bellona Publishing House. ISBN 978-83-1113474-4.
- Trzcińska, Maria (2002). Obóz zagłady w centrum Warszawy. Konzentrationslager Warschau [An extermination camp in the centre of Warsaw. Konzentrationslager Warschau] (in Polish). Radom: Polskie Wydawnictwo Encyklopedyczne. ISBN 83-88822-16-0.
