= Gocke =

Gocke or Göcke is a German surname. Notable people with the surname include:

- Brent Gocke, American television personality
- Justin Gocke (1978–2014), American actor
- Wilhelm Göcke (1898–1944), German Nazi SS concentration camp commandant
