= Maria Trzcińska =

Polish judge and historian (1931–2011)

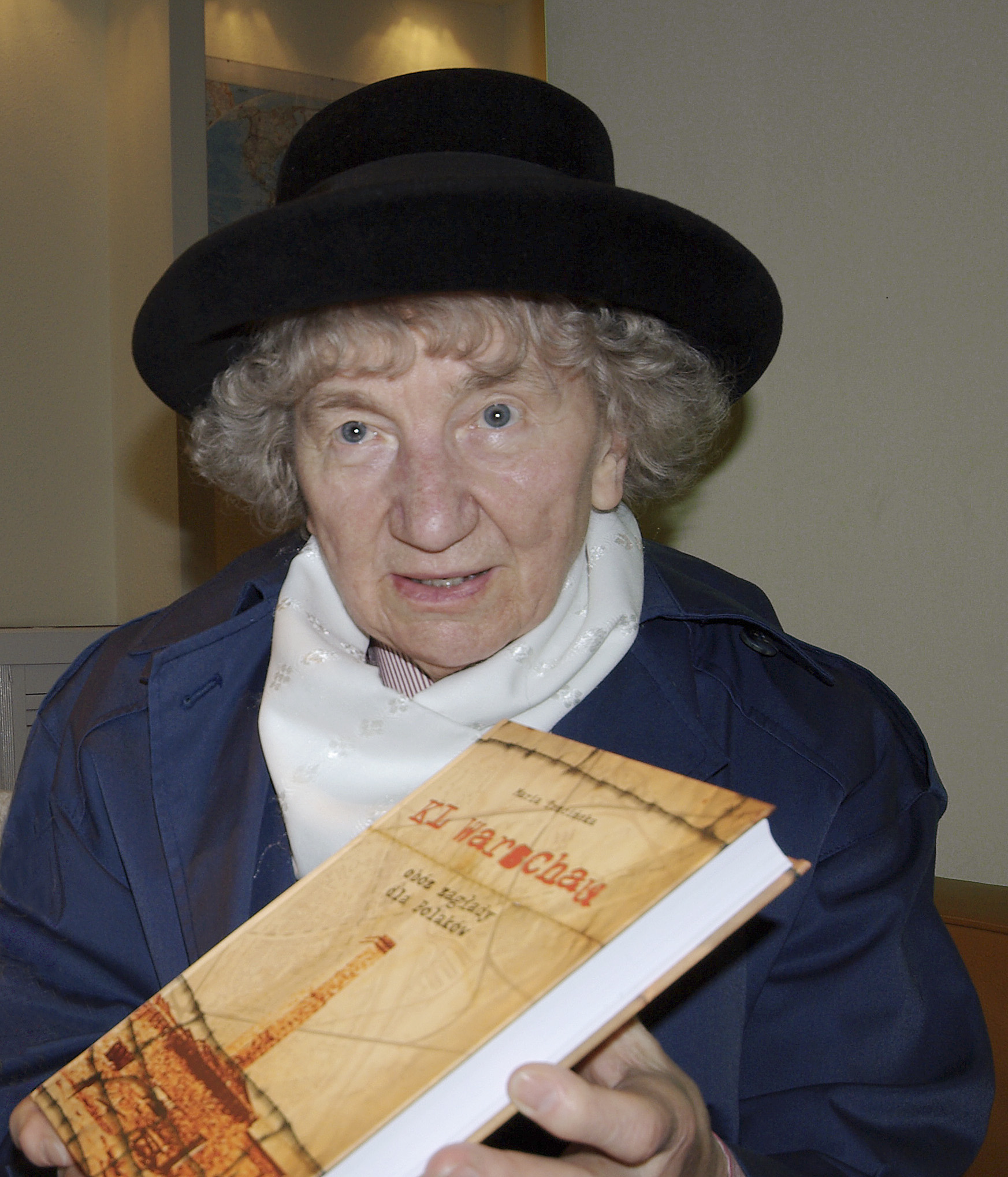
Maria Trzcińska holding a copy of her publication KL Warschau – obóz zagłady dla Polaków, 2008

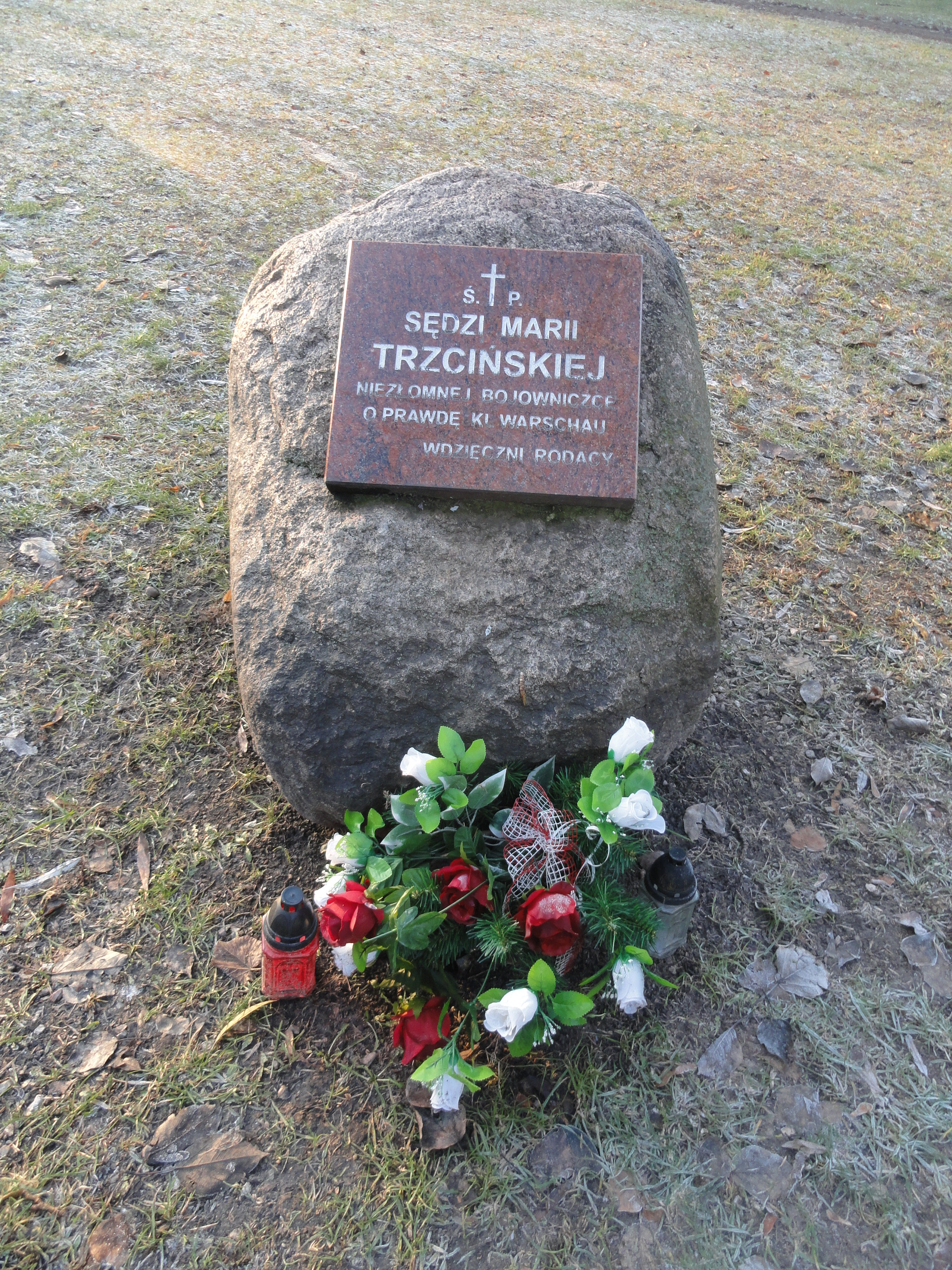
Memorial stone commemorating Maria Trzcińska at Alojzego Pawełka square in Warsaw

Maria (Marianna) Trzcińska (22 March 1931 – 22 December 2011 in Warsaw) was a Polish judge employed for over 30 years in the People's Republic of Poland at the Chief Commission for the Investigation of Nazi Crimes in Poland (Główna Komisja Badania Zbrodni Hitlerowskich w Polsce). She investigated and researched German World War II crimes in Poland.

Trzcińska was the author of a controversial monograph about the Warsaw concentration camp (KL Warschau) set up by the SS in occupied Poland. The book, published in the 1990s, presented a fringe theory which a decade later was definitively rejected by historians. Until 2007, however, her book was the only monograph dedicated to the camp.

== Fringe theory controversy ==
After the collapse of the Eastern Bloc in 1989, Trzcińska asserted that the number of victims of KL Warschau was ten times greater than previously assumed by historians. She had propagated the claim that the camp operated gas chambers, which was rejected by the IPN as unproven. She also argued that the number of victims in the camp was 200,000, about ten times greater than accepted by mainstream historians. Her theory was based on a single interview she conducted during her tenure in the Chief Commission for the Prosecution of Crimes against the Polish Nation (GKBZNwP).

Trzcińska appeared on Radio Maryja and in chauvinist media speaking about the fact that the Nazi German camp in the capital was used in Stalinist Poland as a detention facility for the anti-Nazi resistance. She engaged in a conflict with GKBZNwP successor, the Institute of National Remembrance (IPN), regarding the content of her research, as IPN historians increasingly disagreed with her conclusions, and opposed its further publication. Her copyright request was rejected by the IPN as concerning state property already paid for, including historical documents and testimonies of survivors. Her additional claims made on behalf of a public-monument committee, which unsuccessfully attempted to raise support for a monument dedicated to the alleged much greater size of the German camp extending beyond Warszawa Zachodnia station, a theory Trzcińska promoted in several monographs as well, but that was also refuted by the IPN and other mainstream historians, who consider her fringe theory, based on a single interview, not substantiated enough.

== Bibliography ==
- Maria Trzcińska, KL Warschau. Obóz zagłady dla Polaków, Polskie Wydawnictwo Encyklopedyczne Polwen (in Polish)
- Maria Trzcińska, Obóz zagłady w centrum Warszawy, Polskie Wydawnictwo Encyklopedyczne, Radom 2002, ISBN 83-88822-16-0. (in Polish)
