= Nikolaus Herbet =

Nazi Warsaw concentration camp commandant

Nikolaus Herbet (20 March 1889 – date of death unknown) was a German SS officer and the second and last commandant of Warsaw concentration camp, during the period from September 1943 to July 1944. He was preceded in this function by Wilhelm Göcke.

Herbet was admitted into the SS in March 1927 (member number 2,394), and rose to the rank of SS-Untersturmführer by 1934. In the SS, he served only in an honorary capacity. After joining the NSDAP (Nazi Party member number 68,494) in early April 1927, he was employed mainly at a party publishing house in Dresden. Herbert reached the rank of SS-Hauptsturmführer in 1938. After the beginning of World War II, he was first employed as a member of the Waffen-SS in Mauthausen-Gusen concentration camp in 1940. From September 1943 to July 1944, he was commandant of the Warsaw concentration camp.

Herbet was arrested together with the Schutzhaftlagerführer and the Lagerältester of Warsaw concentration camp in the wake of a corruption scandal in this concentration camp in the spring of 1944. They were accused by the prisoners of extortion of valuables. All three defendants were detained in Sachsenhausen concentration camp. But, Herbet was soon able to return to the concentration camp service.

== Bibliography ==
- Wolfgang Benz, Barbara Distel (ed.): Der Ort des Terrors. Geschichte der nationalsozialistischen Konzentrationslager. Vol. 8: Riga-Kaiserwald, Warschau, Vaivara, Kauen (Kaunas), Płaszów, Kulmhof/Chełmno, Bełżec, Sobibór, Treblinka. Munich 2008, ISBN 978-3-406-57237-1

Military offices
Preceded by SS-Obersturmbannführer Wilhelm Göcke	Commandant of Warsaw concentration camp September 1943 – July 1944	Succeeded by None
