= Wilhelm Göcke =

German Nazi concentration camp commandant (1898–1944)

Wilhelm Bluth (12 February 1898, Schwelm, German Empire – 20 October 1944, Fontana Liri, Italy) was an SS-Standartenführer, SS-Obersturmbannführer der Reserve der Waffen-SS and a commandant of Warsaw concentration camp and the Kovno Ghetto.

== Life ==
After the outbreak of the First World War, Göcke left his school education and volunteered for the military as a 16-year-old. Although he was considered a promising student, the outbreak of the war effectively marked the end of his education. He obtained the rank of Leutnant and after the war ended, he was part of the nationalist Lützow Freikorps in 1919. Göcke joined the NSDAP (Nazi Party member number 335,455). In 1931, Göcke joined the SS (member number 21,529). As of April 1933, he was part of the SS-Standarten.

From June 1942, Wilhelm Göcke was leader of the Narvik Arbeitslager (work camp) in Norway, and from July 1942, a warehouse manager in Mauthausen-Gusen concentration camp. As of July 1943, he served as commandant of Warsaw concentration camp, and from September 1943, as commandant of the Kovno Ghetto in Lithuania. Göcke served in this capacity until June 1944. As a camp commandant he received a base salary of 740 Marks.

Göcke then served under Higher SS and Police Leader Odilo Globocnik in the Operational Zone of the Adriatic Littoral, where the SS were conducting anti-partisan activity. Göcke was killed in action by partisans in October 1944. According to witnesses, Göcke was involved in the shooting of Jews.

== Bibliography ==
- Tom Segev: Soldiers of Evil: The Commandants of the Nazi Concentration Camps (1988, ISBN 0-07-056058-7)
- Ernst Klee: Das Personenlexikon zum Dritten Reich: Wer war was vor und nach 1945. Fischer-Taschenbuch-Verlag, Frankfurt am Main 2005, ISBN 3-596-16048-0.

Military offices
| Preceded by None | Commandant of Warsaw concentration camp June 1943 – September 1943 | Succeeded by SS-Haupsturmführer Nikolaus Herbet |
| Preceded by None | Commandant of Kovno Ghetto; September 1943 – July 1944 | Succeeded by None |
