= Bogusław Tadeusz Kopka =

Polish historian

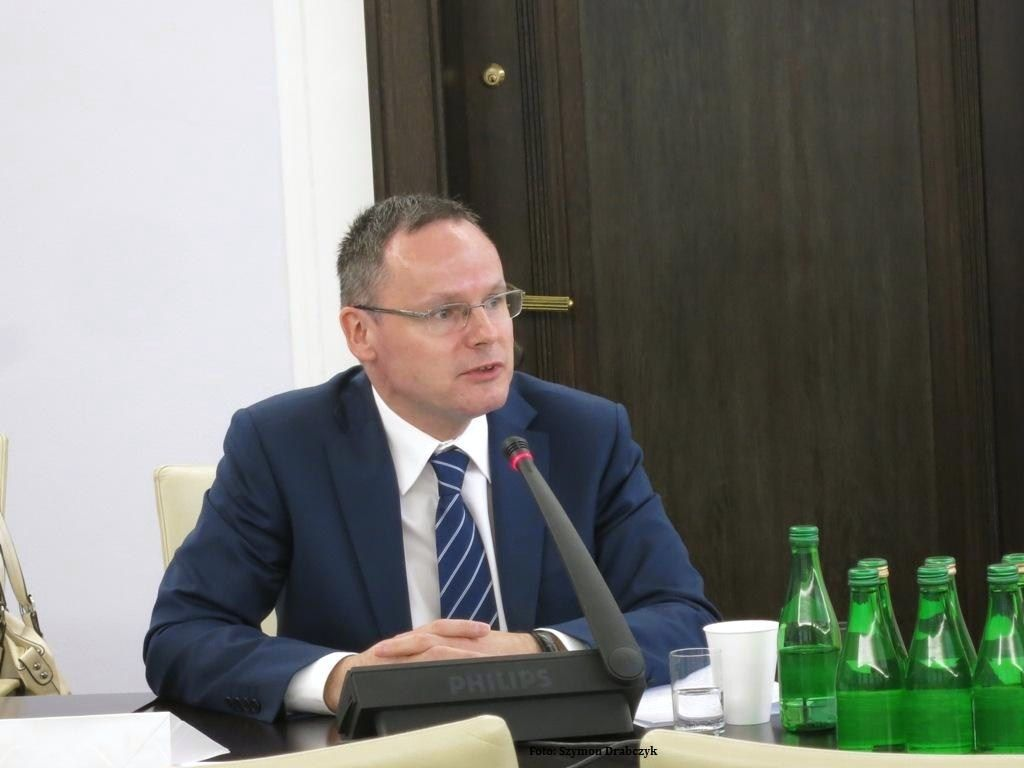
Bogusław Tadeusz Kopka

Bogusław Tadeusz Kopka (born 1969) is a Polish historian and professor. He serves a professor at University of the National Education Commission and as an associate professor at the Warsaw University of Technology Faculty of History and Social Sciences and at the Warsaw Family Alliance Institute of Higher Education. Kopka was formerly a professor at Academy Zamoyska.

Graduated from the Department of History at the University of Warsaw (1994). From 1994 to 2004 worked for the Solidarity Archives Association (Stowarzyszenie "Archiwum Solidarności"). In 1994 became a member of scientific staff of the Central Commission for the Prosecution of Crimes against the Polish Nation (Główna Komisja Badania Zbrodni przeciwko Narodowi Polskiemu) and later on, from 2001 to 2012, worked for the Institute of National Remembrance (Instytut Pamięci Narodowej). In 2006, for his dissertation Obozy pracy w stalinowskim systemie więziennictwa PRL (1944–1950) – organizacja i podstawy funkcjonowania (Labour Camps of the Stalinist Penitentiary System in the People’s Republic of Poland (1944–1950) – organisation and principles of workings) received a doctoral degree in history from the Department of History at the University of Warsaw and in 2011, for his dissertation Das KZ Warschau: Geschichte und Nachwirkungen (the Concentration Camp Warsaw: the History and Repercussions) received a postdoctoral degree in humanities from the Faculty of History and Social Sciences at Cardinal Stefan Wyszyński University in Warsaw (Wydział Nauk Historycznych i Społecznych Uniwersytetu Kardynała Stefana Wyszyńskiego w Warszawie). Since 2012 an associate professor at the Department of Law and Administration of the Faculty of Administration and Social Sciences at the Warsaw University of Technology (Zakład Prawa i Administracji Wydziału Administracji i Nauk Społecznych Politechniki Warszawskiej). 30 October 2013 – 24 June 2014: Vice-Dean for Science at the Faculty of Administration and Social Sciences of the Warsaw University of Technology.

== Awards and distinctions ==
- Stypendium im. Marty Fik (Marta Fik Scholarship) awarded by Fundacja Kultury w Warszawie (Culture Foundation in Warsaw) to write Obozy pracy w Polsce 1944–1950. Przewodnik encyklopedyczny (Labour Camps in Poland 1944 – 1950, An Encyclopaedic Guidebook),
- Nagroda KLIO (KLIO Award) (2007) for Konzentrationslager Warschau. Historia i następstwa (the Concentration Camp Warsaw: the History and Repercussions).
- Awarded a Special Mention in the Janusz Kurtyka Book Prize (2020) for his book Gułag nad Wisłą. Komunistyczne obozy pracy w Polsce 1944–1956 (on Communist labour camps on the territory of Poland, 1944–1956).

== Selected works ==
- Rodem z Solidarności: sylwetki twórców NSZZ "Solidarność" (with Ryszard Żelichowski) (1997) (They Originated from Solidarity: Profiles of the Founders of Solidarity Workers' Union)
- Stan wojenny w dokumentach władz PRL (1980–1983) (with Grzegorz Majchrzak) (2001) (Martial Law in Official Documents)
- Stan wojenny (with Antoni Dudek, Anna Piekarska, Małgorzata Strasz) (2002) (Martial Law)
- Obozy pracy w Polsce 1944–1950: przewodnik encyklopedyczny (2002) (Labour Camps in Poland 1944 – 1950, An Encyclopaedic Guidebook)
- Operacja "Poeta": Służba Bezpieczeństwa na tropach Czesława Miłosza (with Grzegorz Majchrzak, Grzegorz Musidlak) (2007) (Operation Poet: Security Service Tracking Czesław Miłosz)
- Konzentrationslager Warschau: historia i następstwa (2007) (the Concentration Camp Warsaw: the History and Repercussions)
- Aparat bezpieczeństwa wobec V Światowego Festiwalu Młodzieży i Studentów w Warszawie (31 lipca – 14 sierpnia 1955 r.), (w:) „Przegląd Archiwalny Instytutu Pamięci Narodowej" 2008, t. 1 (Security Apparatus against the 5th World Youth Festival in Warsaw – 31 July – 14 August 1955)
- Das KZ Warschau: Geschichte und Nachwirkungen, aus dem Polnischen von Jürgen Hensel (2010)
- Księga bezprawia: akta normatywne kierownictwa resortu Bezpieczeństwa Publicznego (2011) (the Record of Abuse of Authority: Normative Acts Issued by the Management of the Ministry of Public Security)
- Poland First to Fight (współpraca: Paweł Kosiński) (2018)
- Szlaki historyczne w Polsce. Podróże wybrane (wspólnie z R. Andrzejczykiem) (2018).
- Historical Trails in Poland. Selected Journeys (with R. Andrzejczyk) (2018).
- Gułag nad Wisłą. Komunistyczne obozy pracy w Polsce 1944–1956 (2019).
- Wydarzenia bydgoskie 1939 roku (Bydgoszcz events in 1939) (2022).
- Aktion Zamość (1942-1943) (scientific editing with R. Skrzyniarzem i I. Hajscewicz-Zimek) (2023).
- The Vistula GULAG: Communist Labour Camps in Poland 1944-1956 (2024)
- Not only Proust. Józef Czapski in Gryazowiec 1940-1941. Facts and artifacts (in:) "Arcana" 2026, no. 190
