= Wilhelm Jobst =

German physician and convicted war criminal (1912–1947)

Wilhelm Jobst (October 27, 1912 – May 28, 1947), aka Willi Jobst and Willibald Jobst, was a German physician and convicted Nazi war criminal who held the rank of SS Hauptsturmführer as a concentration camp doctor.

== Nazi Germany ==
Jobst came from a German family living in Czech Sudetenland which was ultimately annexed through the Munich Agreement by the Third Reich in September 1938. He joined the NSDAP on November 1, 1938, (membership number 6,749,388), and later became a member of the Waffen-SS in September 1939. During this time he was drafted into the SS-Verfügungstruppe and served with the SS Motorized Division Das Reich (later 2nd SS-Panzer-Division Das Reich) until March 15, 1941. Jobst later took part in fighting on the Eastern Front from June 21, 1941, with the Leibstandarte SS Adolf Hitler (later 1st SS-Panzer Division Leibstandarte-SS Adolf Hitler). He was then transferred, and was initially employed as a camp doctor at the Gross-Rosen concentration camp until 1942 when he was moved to the Sachsenhausen concentration camp. From May 1944 to April 1945 Jobst additionally worked at the Ebensee and Mauthausen concentration camp.

== Post-war ==
After World War II ended, Jobst was among 61 other defendants in the first Mauthausen-Gusen camp trial. Jobst was accused of giving injections to terminally ill prisoners in his capacity as camp doctor in Ebensee from 1944 to 1945. Witnesses also accused him of having tolerated the beating of sick inmates by the Kapos, and of having hit and kicked these inmates himself. Other accusations included neglecting the medical care of inmates in Ebensee. The arrival of a transport consisting of 1,000 to 1,500 prisoners from Silesia in February 1945 was of particular importance in this regard, as 200 are said to have died within a short time. Jobst denied having selected sick prisoners for injections saying he did what was within his means to ensure the care of the camp inmates. He attributed the death rate of the inmates to their poor state of health before they arrived at the camp. The US military court did not believe his story, and Jobst was found guilty of ill-treatment, torture and murder of prisoners in his capacity. He was sentenced to death by hanging on May 13, 1946, and executed on May 28, 1947, at Landsberg Prison.

== See also ==
- List of Nazi doctors
