= Scouting and Guiding in Poland =

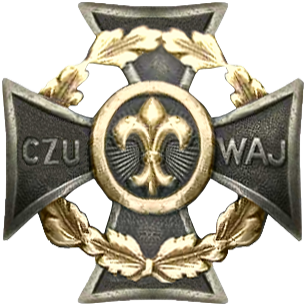
Scouting Cross (Krzyż Harcerski) - the emblem of Polish Scouting

The Scouting and Guiding movement in Poland (Polish: Harcerstwo) consists of about 12 independent organizations with an overall membership of about 160,000 Scouts and Guides. The largest organization by membership is Polish Scouting and Guiding Association (Związek Harcerstwa Polskiego; ZHP) with about 140,000 members.

== History of the Scout movement in Poland ==
=== Background ===
At the beginning of the 20th century, Poland was partitioned between the German, Russian, and Austro-Hungarian Empires. Poles, both adult and young, formed many grass-roots movements and organizations, aimed at preserving the nation and preparing for the eventual struggle for independence. One such group was the youth organization "Zarzewie".

=== Beginning of the Scout movement ===
Scouting was introduced to the Austria-Hungary partition of Poland by Polish writer and publicist Edmund Naganowski, who wrote an article about the organization of Boy Scouts and Boys' Brigades in Słowo Polskie (Lwów, 16 September 1909), among his other articles about English system of education. Later he corresponded with the Chief Scout of the World, Baden-Powell, who encouraged Naganowski to the introduction of scouting in Poland and presented him with a copy of his scouting manual, Scouting for Boys. The manual was translated to Polish by an activist of Zarzewie, Andrzej Małkowski. The work had been assigned to him as a punishment for being a notorious latecomer. Małkowski became enthusiastic and worked to implement the new movement with his wife Olga.

As a result, the Polish Scout movement was started in 1910 in Lwów. At first, the Scouts did not have a standardized uniform, as some of the formed groups wanted to remain independent. However, all the groups accepted similar style and design, and the worldwide scout badge with a lily and the extra letters ONC (standing for "Ojczyzna, Nauka, Cnota", i.e. "Fatherland, Study, Virtue"). The program was made up of three parts; the common Scout idea, the science, especially study of national history and language with national values, and basic military training.

Various independent Scout groups were developed under the oversight of the existing organizations, mainly gymnastics society "Sokół", independence-oriented "Zarzewie", or the abstinence organization "Eleusis" (pl). Thanks to the influence of the latter, to this day Scouting code in Poland obliges "to be pure in thinking, in speech, and in deeds; not to smoke; not to drink alcohol".

The rapid development and popularity of Boy Scouts continued up to 1914, but was interrupted by the outbreak of World War I.

=== World War II ===
After the German invasion of Poland of 1939 the ZHP was deemed a criminal organization by the Nazis (who had gone so far as to begin executing many scouts and guides, along with other possible resistance leaders), but they carried on as a clandestine organization. They received the code namethe Grey Ranks (Szare Szeregi), and cooperated with the Polish Secret State, in particular the Union of Armed Struggle and the Armia Krajowa.

Some Older Scouts carried out sabotage missions and armed resistance. The Girl Guides formed auxiliary units working as nurses, liaisons and munition carriers. At the same time the youngest Scouts were involved in so-called "small sabotage" under the auspice of the Wawer organization, which included dropping leaflets or painting the kotwica sign on the walls. During Operation Tempest, the Scouts actively participated in the fights, especially during the Warsaw Uprising.

==== Notable personalities ====
Name / Notability / References

|- style="vertical-align:text-top;" class="vcard" | class="fn" |Ryszard Białous | class="note" |Scouter. Szarych Szeregów. | style="text-align:center;" | |- style="vertical-align:text-top;" class="vcard" | class="fn" |Jan Roman Bytnar | class="note" |Scouter. Szarych Szeregów. | style="text-align:center;" | |- style="vertical-align:text-top;" class="vcard" | class="fn" |Sławomir Maciej Bittner | class="note" |Scoutmaster. Officer, Armia Krajowa. Arrested and killed by Gestapo. | style="text-align:center;" | |- style="vertical-align:text-top;" class="vcard" | class="fn" |Stanisław Broniewski | class="note" |Naczelnik (Chief Scout), Szare Szeregi. Officer, Armia Krajowa. | style="text-align:center;" | |- style="vertical-align:text-top;" class="vcard" | class="fn" |Tadeusz Chciuk / Celt Marek | class="note" |Biali Kurierzy, Szare Szeregi. | style="text-align:center;" | |- style="vertical-align:text-top;" class="vcard" | class="fn" |Maciej Aleksy Dawidowski | class="note" |He was born in 1920 and died in 1943 after getting shot during Operation Arsenal. He was a member of the Szare Szeregi and the Armia Krajowa during World War II. He held the rank of sergeant and served as a scoutmaster, taking part in underground resistance activities against the German occupation. | style="text-align:center;" | |- style="vertical-align:text-top;" class="vcard" | class="fn" |Jadwiga Falkowska | class="note" |Co-Founder of Polish Girl Guides. Executed by the Russians. | style="text-align:center;" | |- style="vertical-align:text-top;" class="vcard" | class="fn" |Stefan Wincenty Frelichowski | class="note" |Scout. Scouter. Priest. Died in Nazi prison. Beatified. | style="text-align:center;" | |- style="vertical-align:text-top;" class="vcard" | class="fn" |Józef Andrzej Grzesiak | class="note" |Scoutmaster. Szarych Szeregów. | style="text-align:center;" | |- style="vertical-align:text-top;" class="vcard" | class="fn" |Kazimierz Iwiński | class="note" |Teacher. Education official. Scouter. Commander of Scout resistance fighters. | style="text-align:center;" | |- style="vertical-align:text-top;" class="vcard" | class="fn" |Ryszard Kaczorowski | class="note" |President of Poland in exile. He was a Scouting instructor of a local branch of the Polish Scouting Association. Following the Invasion of Poland in the beginning of World War II he recreated the Scout movement – then delegalised by the Soviet authorities – clandestinely, and became a head of the Białystok banner of the Szare Szeregi. | style="text-align:center;" | |- style="vertical-align:text-top;" class="vcard" | class="fn" |Aleksander Kamiński | class="note" |Teacher, Scoutmaster, Szarych Szeregów. Editor-in-Chief, Biuletyn Informacyjny, Armia Krajowa. Declared Righteous Among the Nations. | style="text-align:center;" | |- style="vertical-align:text-top;" class="vcard" | class="fn" |Józefa Kantor | class="note" |Founder of Mury, the clandestine Polish Girl Guide group inside Ravensbrück concentration camp. | style="text-align:center;" | |- style="vertical-align:text-top;" class="vcard" | class="fn" |Bronisław Maria Komorowski | class="note" |President of Poland. For many years he was affiliated with the Scout Movement. He belonged to the 75th Mazovian Scout Team in Pruszków. During his studies he was a Scout instructor in 208 WDHiZ Batalion in Mokotów. He met his future wife through Scouting. | style="text-align:center;" | |- style="vertical-align:text-top;" class="vcard" | class="fn" |Florian Marciniak | class="note" |Naczelnik (Chief Scout), Szare Szeregi. Executed by the Nazis. | style="text-align:center;" | |- style="vertical-align:text-top;" class="vcard" | class="fn" |Maria Irena Mileska | class="note" |Scout. "Jaga", war resister | style="text-align:center;" | |- style="vertical-align:text-top;" class="vcard" | class="fn" |Władysław Ossowski | class="note" |Scout. Biali Kurierzy, Szare Szeregi. | style="text-align:center;" | |- style="vertical-align:text-top;" class="vcard" | class="fn" |Kazimierz Piechowski | class="note" |Arrested by the Nazis for being a Scout. Escaped from Auschwitz concentration camp. Joined Armia Krajowa; fought the Nazis. Jailed seven years by the Russians. "I will be a Scout to the end of my life." | style="text-align:center;" | |- style="vertical-align:text-top;" class="vcard" | class="fn" |Witold Pilecki | class="note" |ZHP Scout and soldier. Armia Krajowa intelligence officer. Allied spy and war hero who voluntarily infiltrated Auschwitz death camp, escaped, and reported to the world the Nazis' conduct of the Holocaust! Executed by Soviet-aligned Communists for working for the Allies - the story of his heroism consigned to oblivion and surviving in the memories of Polish emigres abroad. Declared a Righteous Among the Nations. Pilecki's life story started to be told after the collapse of Communism in 1989. Posthumously conferred the Order of Polonia Restituta in 1995 and the Order of the White Eagle (the highest Polish decoration) in 2006. | style="text-align:center;" | |- style="vertical-align:text-top;" class="vcard" | class="fn" |Józef Pukowiec | class="note" |Teacher. Scoutmaster. Tortured and killed by Nazis. | style="text-align:center;" | |- style="vertical-align:text-top;" class="vcard" | class="fn" |Rudolf Regner | class="note" |Scout. Biali Kurierzy, Szare Szeregi. | style="text-align:center;" | |- style="vertical-align:text-top;" class="vcard" | class="fn" |Jan Rodowicz | class="note" |Scouter. Szarych Szeregów. | style="text-align:center;" | |- style="vertical-align:text-top;" class="vcard" | class="fn" |Andrzej Romocki | class="note" |Scouter. Szarych Szeregów. | style="text-align:center;" | |- style="vertical-align:text-top;" class="vcard" | class="fn" |Jan Romocki | class="note" |Scouter. Szarych Szeregów. | style="text-align:center;" | |- style="vertical-align:text-top;" class="vcard" | class="fn" |Stanisław Sedlaczek | class="note" |Professor. Scoutmaster. Murdered at Auschwitz. | style="text-align:center;" | |- style="vertical-align:text-top;" class="vcard" | class="fn" |Eugeniusz Stasiecki | class="note" |Scouter. Szarych Szeregów. | style="text-align:center;" | |- style="vertical-align:text-top;" class="vcard" | class="fn" |Tadeusz Strumiłło | class="note" |Scouter. President of the ZHP. Professor of the underground university system. | style="text-align:center;" | |- style="vertical-align:text-top;" class="vcard" | class="fn" |Anna Zawadzka | class="note" |Sister of Tadeusz Zawadzki. Scouter. Szarych Szeregów. Teacher. Vice President of the post-Communist ZHP. | style="text-align:center;" | |- style="vertical-align:text-top;" class="vcard" | class="fn" |Tadeusz Zawadzki | class="note" |Codename "Zośka." Scouter. Szarych Szeregów. After whom the famous Batalion Zośka was named. | style="text-align:center;" | |- style="vertical-align:text-top;" class="vcard" | class="fn" |Jerzy Eugeniusz Zborowski | class="note" |Scoutmaster. Commander, Batalion Parasol, Armia Krajowa. | style="text-align:center;" | |}

=== In communist Poland ===
OH ZMP Badge − "czuwajka".

In 1945, the ZHP restored its former name and returned to public existence. However, the communist authorities of Poland pressured the organization to become a member of the Pioneer Movement, and eventually, in 1949, banned it, while its members joined the Polish United Workers' Party as a result. A new organization under the same name was created by communist government after the death of Soviet premier Joseph Stalin on the basis of membership of the government-sponsored Scouting and Guiding Organization of the Union of Polish Youth (Organizacja Harcerska Związku Młodzieży Polskiej, OH ZMP).

=== History of Scouting in Greater Poland ===
Bernard Chrzanowski and Ksawery Zakrzewski decided to create a new Scout movement in the area. On October 17, 1912 in the flat of Henry Śniegocki, came into existence the first organization of Greater Poland Boy Scouts, formed by Cezary Jindra, Henryk Śniegocki, Wincenty Wierzejewski, Edmund Weclawski, Leonard Skowroński, and Tadeusz Wolski.

Before, in September 1912, Tadeusz Strumiłło and Jerzy Grodyński (pl) helped to start the Scout movement in Greater Poland. At first the roles they divided as between friends, alternating. Gradually, more and more authority fell upon Wincenty Wierzejewski. In 1915, Wierzejewski deserted from the Army and made Scouting first priority. Henryk Śniegocki became with time his "alter ego", a dedicated and trusted proxy. The other members aksi accepted his leadership. They gained more outstanding people, for example Jan Konkolewski, who previously collected a group of boys dedicated to diversion and sabotage of the German Army, the so-called "Zouaves". By 1913, the patrol grew to a troop, including patrols named after Bolesław the Brave, Kazimierz the Great and Mieszko the First. Next the troop became a group, and the patrols increased to troops. The second troop was named after Władysław Jagiełło.

Soon more patrols grew into troops. Despite the rapid growth, the Scouts remained in hiding, acting illegally. The same happened with two troops of Girl Guides, named after Emilia Plater and Queen Jadwiga.

==== World War I ====
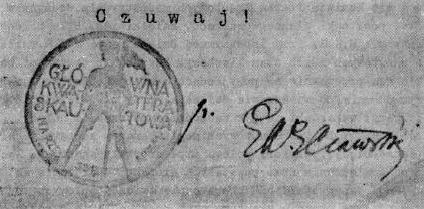
Reproduction of the seal of Scout headquarters on the German Reich territory - signed by Węcławski, the secretary

Around the end of 1914 and the beginning of 1915, the Scout movement resumed, but continued in hiding. The temporary interruption was not exactly caused by the imposed martial law, but mainly the absence of the mature leadership, who were mobilized in the German Army.

In January 1915, Henryk Śniegocki came back from the front on sick leave and managed to extend his leave. A few weeks later the wounded Wierzejewski turned up for treatment. After recovery, he decided to desert. Henryk Śniegocki, who now took the command of the Scout troops after Wierzejewski, tried to make the status of scouting legal with the pretext of caring for the boys whose fathers were mobilized in the Army, but without success. Bronisław Drwęski, commanding the Scout troop named after Kazimierz the Great, died a few days after serving a 3 months prison term.

On April 2, 1916, they created MKS, the Local Scouts Command, including all troops from the city and aiding, if necessary, the troops from the provinces.

In November 1915, Ksawery Zakrzewski died and Wincenty Wierzejewski took his place as leader. Henryk Śniegocki took command of the Scout Groups. Thanks to the aid of Józef Kostrzewski, Wierzejewski arranged a secret den in the Museum of PSFAS (Poznań Society of Friends of Arts and Sciences) and lived there. He also took a calculated risk himself, on the strength of a self-produced passport and travel document he tried to cross the border to Switzerland and contact the Polish Aid Committee.

By the end of 1916, the integration progressed further, resulting in the creation of a secret Headquarters of Scouts in the German Reich (territory).

==== Post-World War I ====
Henryk Śniegocki became the Chief of Scouts troop in the Directorate of Greater-Poland Scout Troops (with Anna Krysiewicz, commanding the Girl Guides). In July 1919, he was one of three delegates for the meeting, resulting in a merger of Greater-Poland Scouts with the ZHP. However, in 1920, he volunteered, as an already experienced organizer to the plebiscite of the Mazurs and next fought in the second and third Silesia uprisings.

In the newly formed Poland, he became a teacher in a primary school, at the same time continuing his Scout work. A few years later, he again commanded the Greater-Poland Banner, but not for long. With the ruling Sanacja unfriendly, he was transferred away from Poznań and had to resign from the honorable Scout role. He appealed to the court justice, and won several times, only to be sent away again repeatedly, a further distance each time, in "the interest of the school" behind the Pińsk. Finally, he won the case and came back to Poznań, but many years had passed. Yet this maybe allowed him to outlive the first occupation, imprisoned and displaced he survived in Częstochowa. When he came back to Poznań he was again removed by the communist Government, both from the Scouts as well from school. The rest of his life he fought for the truth in the history commissions.

=== Other notable personalities ===
Name / Notability / References

|- style="vertical-align:text-top;" class="vcard" | class="fn" |Karolina Kaczorowska | class="note" |First Lady of Poland in exile | style="text-align:center;" | |- style="vertical-align:text-top;" class="vcard" | class="fn" |Anna Komorowska | class="note" |First Lady of Poland | style="text-align:center;" | |- style="vertical-align:text-top;" class="vcard" | class="fn" |Kazimierz Lutosławski | class="note" |Physician, priest, Scouter; designed Scout cross | style="text-align:center;" | |- style="vertical-align:text-top;" class="vcard" | class="fn" |Andrzej Małkowski and Olga Drahonowska-Małkowska | class="note" |Founders of Scouting and Guiding in Poland; Andrzej translated Scouting for Boys into Polish. | style="text-align:center;" | |- style="vertical-align:text-top;" class="vcard" | class="fn" |Kazimierz Aleksander Sabbat | class="note" |President of Poland in exile | style="text-align:center;" | |}

== Scouting organizations ==
=== National organizations ===
- Polish Scouting and Guiding Association (in Polish: Związek Harcerstwa Polskiego, ZHP), member of the World Organization of the Scout Movement, the World Association of Girl Guides and Girl Scouts and of the International Scout and Guide Fellowship
- Scouting Association of the Republic (in Polish: Związek Harcerstwa Rzeczypospolitej, ZHR), observer at the Confédération Européenne de Scoutisme
- Stowarzyszenie Harcerstwa Katolickiego "Zawisza" Federacja Skautingu Europejskiego, member of the International Union of Guides and Scouts of Europe
- Royal Rangers Polska
- Stowarzyszenie Harcerskie

=== Local small organizations ===
- in Warsaw, Pułtusk and Warka: Stowarzyszenie Harcerskie
- in Masuria: Harcerski Ruch Ochrony Środowiska im. św. Franciszek z Asyżu
- in Tricity: Niezależny Krąg Instruktorów Harcerskich Leśna Szkółka
- in Jarocin: Organizacja Harcerska "Rodło"
- in Kraków: Szczep Czerwonych Maków im. Bohaterów Monte Cassino
- in Tricity: Krąg Harcerski "LS - Drzewo Pokoju"
- in Dzierżoniów County: Związek Harcerstwa Wiejskiego
- in Skawina: Niezależny Związek Harcerstwa "Czerwony Mak"
- in Toruń: Harcerstwo Polskie
- in Warsaw and Białystok: Skauci Świętego Bernarda z Clairvaux

=== Polish Scouting abroad ===
Polish Scouts-in-Exile organizations include

- Związek Harcerstwa Polskiego Poza Granicami Kraju (not affiliated to Polish Scouting and Guiding Association in Poland) with chapters in Australia, Argentina, Canada, France, Germany, Sweden, the United Kingdom and the United States
- Związek Harcerstwa Polskiego na Litwie (Polish Scouting in Lithuania)
- Republikańskie Społeczne Zjednoczenie "Harcerstwo" (Białoruś) (Polish Scouting in Belarus)
- Harcerstwo Polskie na Ukrainie (Polish Scouting in Ukraine)
- Związek Harcerstwa Polskiego na Łotwie (Polish Scouting in Latvia)
- Harcerstwo Polskie w Republice Czeskiej (Polish Scouting in the Czech Republic)
- Niezależny Hufiec Harcerstwa Polskiego "Leśna Szkółka - Kaszuby" in Sweden
- Związek Harcerstwa Rzeczypospolitej w Kanadzie (Scouting Association of the Republic (Poland) in Canada; not affiliated to Scouting Association of the Republic in Poland)

== International Scouting units in Poland ==
In addition, there are USA Girl Scouts Overseas in Warsaw, serviced by way of USAGSO headquarters in New York City; American Cub Scouts and Boy Scouts linked to the Horizon District of the Transatlantic Council of the Boy Scouts of America, which supports units in west-and-central Europe, the Near East and North Africa.

== Poland Network Scout Fellowship ==
The Poland Network Scout Fellowship is a British forum for members of The Scout Association with a specific interest in Poland, assisting and forging links with Scouting there.

== See also ==
- Scouting in displaced persons camps
