= Małkowski (surname) =

Małkowski is a Polish masculine surname. Its feminine counterpart is Małkowska. It may refer to:

- Andrzej Małkowski (1888–1919), Polish scout
- Ed Marlo (born Edward Malkowski, 1913–1991), American magician
- Eugeniusz Geno Malkowski (1942–2016), Polish painter
- Gary Malkowski (born 1958), Canadian provincial politician
- Maciej Małkowski (born 1985), Polish association football player
- Olga Drahonowska-Małkowska (1888–1979), Polish scout, wife of Andrzej
- Sebastian Małkowski (born 1987), Polish association football player
- Zbigniew Małkowski (born 1978), Polish association football player
