= Naganowski =

Naganowski (feminine: Naganowska) is a Polish-language surname. It may refer to:

- Edmund Naganowski (1853–1915), Polish publicist and writer
- Egon Naganowski (1913–2000), Polish literary critic, essayist, and literary translator
- Irena Naganowska (1914–1990) Polish award-winning translator from German
