= Biali =

Biali may refer to

- Laila Biali (born 1980), Canadian jazz singer and pianist
- Berba language or Biali language of Benin
- Biali Kurierzy, a group of Polish boy scouts and soldiers that existed in 1939–1940

== See also ==
- Bialis
- Bialy
- Biały
