= The Troubles of a Gnome =

Children's book by Zofia Kossak-Szczucka

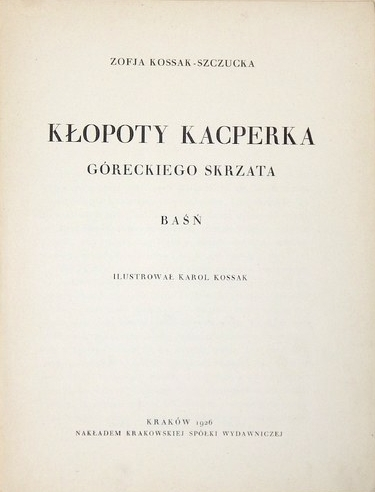
- Title page of the first edition
- Author: Zofia Kossak-Szczucka
- Language: Polish
- Genre: children's and young adult literature
- Publisher: Krakowska Spółka Wydawnicza
- Publication date: 1926
- Publication place: Poland

The Troubles of a Gnome (Polish: Kłopoty Kacperka góreckiego skrzata) is a 1926 children's fairy tale by Polish writer Zofia Kossak-Szczucka. Set in Cieszyn Silesia shortly after the region became part of the Second Polish Republic, it follows Kacperek, a centuries-old household gnome and guardian spirit of a manor in Górki Wielkie, as he attempts to recover his stolen magical talisman from the demon Sato.

Kossak-Szczucka based the setting on the manor in Górki Wielkie where she lived and wrote the book for her children, who appear in the story. The work combines elements of fantasy and Polish folklore with descriptions of the region's landscape and culture, and explores themes including Polish identity and patriotism, religion, the relationship between humanity and nature, and the struggle between good and evil.

The book was translated into English by Monica Mary Gardner as The Troubles of a Gnome in 1928 and has subsequently appeared in numerous Polish editions and several stage adaptations. Its language and descriptions of nature have received particular critical praise, and several Polish literary scholars have regarded it as one of the finest Polish fairy tales. In 2021 it was added to the compulsory reading list for the first three grades of Polish primary schools, a decision that generated debate over its suitability for contemporary children and its treatment of German and Silesian identity.

== Background and development ==
Zofia Kossak-Szczucka settled in Górki Wielkie in Cieszyn Silesia in the early 1920s, shortly after Poland regained independence following the dissolution of Austria-Hungary, which previously controlled the region. Following the death of her husband, she moved there with her two children to live with her parents, who had rented an old manor in the village. Kossak became fascinated with the landscape, customs and culture of Cieszyn Silesia, as well as its traditions and distinctive dialect. The manor and its immediate surroundings became the setting of The Troubles of a Gnome. This was Kossak-Szczucka's third book and the only work she wrote for children. Her target audience were not only children in general, but also her own, Julka and Tadzio, who have been written into the story.

The book appeared near the beginning of what became a recurring Silesian strand in Kossak-Szczucka's writing. She wrote much of her prewar work at Górki Wielkie, and her later works concerning Silesia included Nieznany kraj (Unknown Country, 1932), Z dziejów Śląska (From the History of Silesia, 1933), Skarb Śląski (The Silesian Treasure, 1937), and Na Śląsku (In Silesia, 1939). Her association with the region continued throughout the interwar period; in 1932 she received the literary award of the Silesian Voivodeship.

== Editions and translations ==
The first edition was published in 1926 by Krakowska Spółka Wydawnicza. Subsequent editions appeared in 1938 (dated 1937), 1946, 1958, 1968, 1985 (twice), 1996, 2004 (twice), 2008, and 2019. In 1928, the book was translated into English by Monica Mary Gardner, illustrated by Charles Folkard and published by A & C Black in London. The title of the English translation has been shortened, removing the main character's name – the Polish title literally reads The Troubles of Kacperek the Gnome.

The book has been illustrated by various artists over the years; the first edition featured illustrations by Karol Kossak, and other illustrators included Adam Kilian (1958), Antoni Boratyński (1968), Krystyna Gorecka-Wencel (1985), Krzysztof Marcinek (1985), Katarzyna Słowiańska (1986), Joanna Ciombor (2004, 2008), Feliks Matyjaszkiewicz (2004), and Bartłomiej Grudzień (2019).

== Sequels and adaptations ==
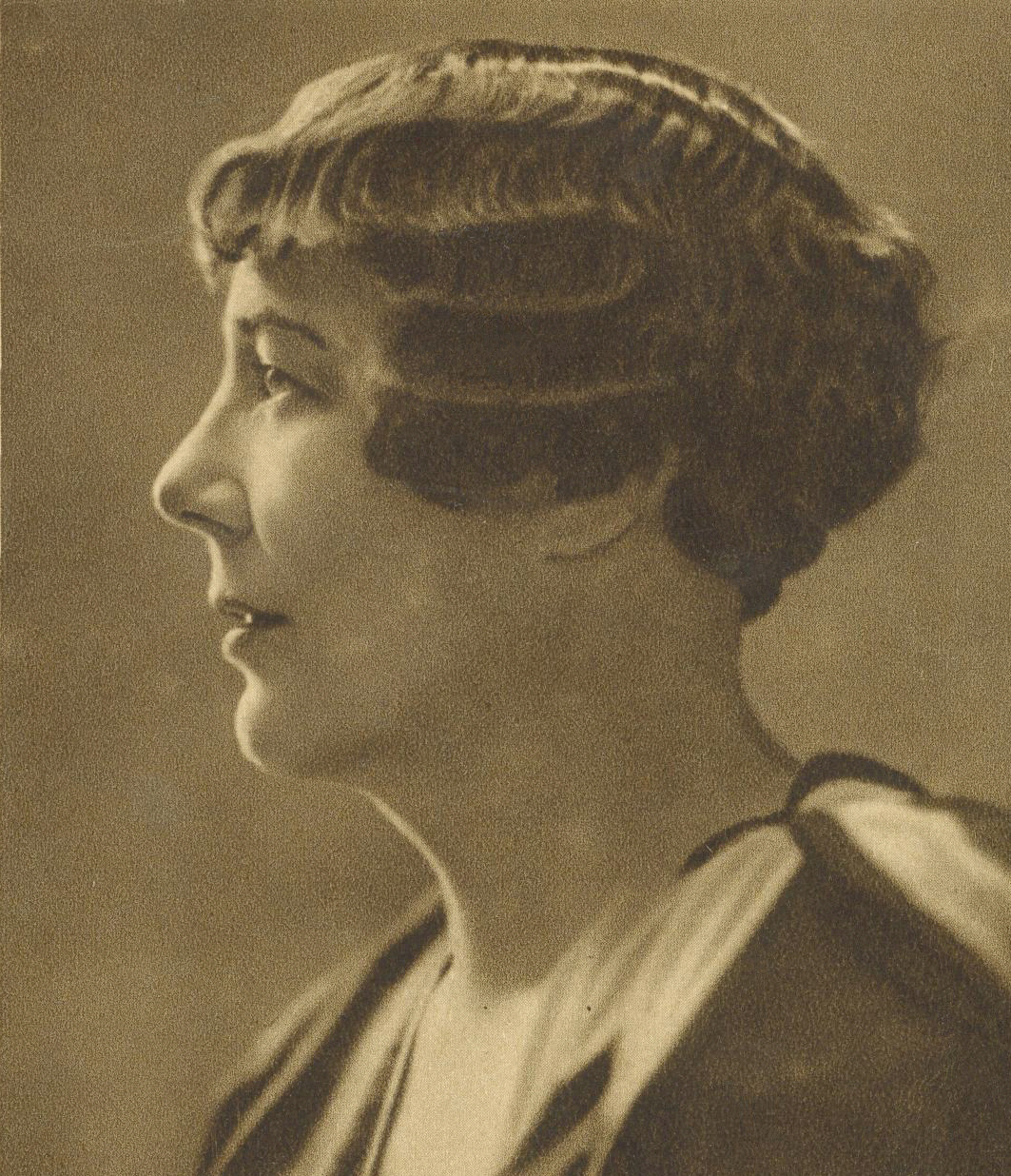
Zofia Kossak-Szczucka

The author considered writing a sequel to the novel, but this plan was not realized. The work was adapted for the stage, including productions in 1998 (Lalka Theatre) and 2016 (Gry i Ludzie Theatre).

In the early 2000s, Se-ma-for worked on a puppet film based on the book titled Maru – Tajemniczy Talizman (Maru – The Mysterious Talisman), directed by Jacek Łechtański. The film was described in the media as a planned Polish animated superproduction with over 50 puppet characters, but it was never completed. The book is also available as an audiobook (2017, read by Anna Polony).

== Plot ==
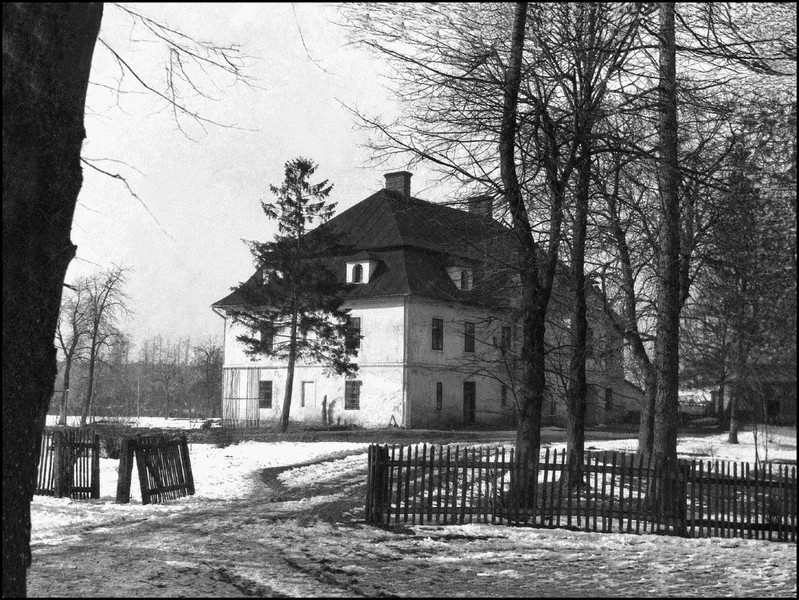
Kossak's family manor house in Górki Wielkie

The novel is set in Cieszyn Silesia shortly after the region became part of the Second Polish Republic. Its protagonist is Kacperek, a 314-year-old household gnome (Note: In the English translation, the Polish term skrzat was translated as gnome; however, Kossak also refers to the main character in-text using the term less common term podciepek (Borodo, 2015).) and the benevolent guardian spirit of the manor in Górki Wielkie. Kacperek has guarded the manor for more than three centuries. He grows old and increasingly inactive during the years in which the house is occupied by a German family, longing for its former inhabitants and the Polish language. Following the restoration of Polish rule, the Germans leave and Poles again inhabit the manor; overjoyed by the change, Kacperek is magically rejuvenated and resumes his duties as guardian of the house.

Armed with the magical earring known as the maru, which grants invisibility and the ability to travel instantly, he keeps order among the many lesser supernatural creatures living in and around the house, featuring both creatures inspired by local folklore as well as others invented by the author. These creatures include entities ranging from Hlacz Chlustacz, the ruler of the Brennica river, to sprites invented by the author (e.g., kanapony, which collect useful objects in the worn-out sides of sofas). His greatest enemy is the malicious demon hobgoblin Sato, who dwells beneath nearby Zebrzydka, guarding a hidden robber's treasure and envying the freedom that the maru gives to household gnomes.

The main story begins when the family living in the manor rescues and shelters an injured owl. While recovering, the owl discovers Kacperek's hiding place and steals the unattended maru, carrying it to Sato. Deprived of his magical powers, Kacperek is unable to fulfill his duties and, after learning who stole the talisman, sets out to recover it. Assisted by loyal animals, friendly household spirits and other supernatural beings, he follows the trail to Sato's domain, while the demon uses the stolen maru to extend his influence and gather allies among evil creatures.

The ensuing adventure leads Kacperek through the forests, rivers and mountains of Cieszyn Silesia. The search culminates in Sato's kidnapping of Kacperek and a battle between the forces of good and evil, in which his friends and allies come to his rescue. Sato is defeated, the maru is recovered, and peace returns to Górki Wielkie, while Kacperek resumes his role as the manor's guardian spirit.

== Analysis ==
=== Style ===
The language of The Troubles of a Gnome has been repeatedly singled out by critics and scholars. In 1929, Julian Krzyżanowski, reviewing the English translation for The Slavonic and East European Review, praised the rich style of the original and argued that Monica M. Gardner's translation successfully preserved its atmosphere; he suggested that in some passages the translation even achieved a greater unity of form and content than the Polish text itself. In another article, published in the Polish journal Przegląd Współczesny, he also commended Gardner's adaptation of the characters' names for English readers and Charles Folkard's illustrations, which he considered well suited to the book and effectively harmonizing with its text.

In 2004, literary scholar Krystyna Heska-Kwaśniewicz described the book's language as a "model of beauty, correctness, and simplicity". Michał Borodo similarly characterized it in 2015 as a "truly Polish fairy tale, with a deeply religious undertone, written in beautiful, occasionally slightly archaic Polish". In her 2020 analysis, Heska-Kwaśniewicz drew particular attention to the language's "onomatopoeic and semantic qualities", the emphasis on colors, hues and scents, and Kossak-Szczucka's inventive names for fantastic creatures. She also praised the "masterful" descriptions of nature and characters.

The qualities admired by scholars have also been regarded as potentially making the book difficult for contemporary children. In 2021, the author's grandson, literary scholar François Rosset, called the book "wonderful" but considered it "difficult for most children today due to its complex, though beautiful, language". Zofia Ozaist-Zgodzińska, writing in 2022, observed that its original intended audience was younger children, approximately eight to ten years old, growing up in the period before World War II.

=== Themes ===
==== Polish identity and patriotism ====
Polish national identity is a prominent element of the work. Borodo noted the importance that the titular gnome Kacperek attaches to Polishness, particularly the Polish language, as well as to God. Borodo noted the book's numerous positive references to Poland and its history, arguing that it "could potentially contribute to a positive image of Poland in English-speaking countries", but that this potential was limited by the English translation appearing in only one edition. Heska-Kwaśniewicz similarly characterized the work as a "lesson in honesty and patriotism and an unforgettable adventure".

This aspect of the book has also attracted criticism. In 2021, journalist Wojciech Szot described the work as outdated, anti-German and anti-Silesian. He objected to its negative depiction of Germans and argued that Silesians are absent because their presence and language would disrupt what he regarded as the book's idealized Polish image of the region.

==== Nature, folklore and regional setting ====
Krzyżanowski praised Kossak-Szczucka's blending of fantasy with a realistic rural setting rooted in Polish folklore, emphasizing in particular the work's depiction of the bond between humanity and nature. Heska-Kwaśniewicz likewise drew attention to its elaborate representations of nature, including colors, hues and scents, and considered its descriptions of nature and characters "masterful".

The regional setting also gives the book an educational dimension. Heska-Kwaśniewicz noted its detailed depiction of the Cieszyn Silesia region and wrote that the book "can still serve as an excellent guide to [that region]". When the book was included in the Polish primary-school reading list in 2021, the Ministry of National Education, according to Anna Józefowicz, justified its inclusion as intended to "strengthen regional identity".

==== Morality and religion ====
Heska-Kwaśniewicz interpreted the struggle between Kacperek and Sato as an example of the classic motif of the battle between good and evil. She also noted the book's religious layer, including "assurances of divine protection" and other references to Christianity. Borodo also described the fairy tale as having a "deeply religious undertone" and noted the importance Kacperek places on God. Likewise, Krzyżanowski identified friendship, self-sacrifice and the triumph of good over evil as central to the book's moral dimension.

In a 2020 review for the zine Esensja, Wojciech Gołąbowski similarly interpreted the book as a story about the struggle between good and evil, but also about overcoming personal weakness. He highlighted its treatment of the consequences of serving evil or pretending that evil does not concern oneself, as well as friendship, kindness and the possibility of finding courage despite cowardice. Heska-Kwaśniewicz also emphasized the darker side of this moral conflict: some passages are designed to evoke horror and disgust, particularly the descriptions of antagonists and their fates, including the death of the owl who serves as the demon's helper.

== Reception ==
=== Reception ===
Following the publication of the English edition in 1928, Austrian literary historian Otto Forst de Battaglia praised the book as "one of the most beautiful fairy tales in the world". Reviewing the translation the following year, Krzyżanowski described it as one of the finest introductions to Polish fairy tale literature available in English.

The book continued to receive strong praise from Polish literary scholars. In 2004, philologist Jolanta Ługowska called it "one of the most beautiful Polish fairy tales". Heska-Kwaśniewicz, who wrote the preface to one of the book's editions, likewise considered it the most beautiful Polish fairy tale and called it a "masterpiece of its genre".

A book of educational materials, Wokół „Kłopotów Kacperka góreckiego skrzata” Zofii Kossak: materiały dla nauczycieli przedszkoli i szkół podstawowych (Around "The Troubles of a Gnome" by Zofia Kossak: Materials for Preschool and Primary School Teachers), was published in 2004. Reviewing these materials, Barbara Pytlos argued that the book, when used with the accompanying educational resources, could teach children history, geography and mathematics. She also praised Joanna Ciombor's illustrations for the 2004 edition.

=== School curriculum debates ===
The book was included as required reading for grades 1–3 of Polish primary schools in 2021 (Note: In 2017, it was listed in a parliamentary interpellation as a candidate for the list of compulsory readings for primary schools (Gołąbowski 2020).) and remained on the list in the 2025/2026 school year.

Its inclusion generated disagreement over both its suitability for contemporary children and the reasons for its selection. Rosset considered the addition of several of Kossak-Szczucka's works to the reading list an "ideological-political operation", while simultaneously describing The Troubles of a Gnome itself as "wonderful", although linguistically difficult for most contemporary children. Szot criticized the choice on the grounds that the book was outdated, anti-German and anti-Silesian. By contrast, according to Józefowicz, the Ministry of National Education presented the work as a means of strengthening regional identity.

In 2023, Jacek Podsiadło also criticized the book, comparing it unfavorably with the more recent fantasy novel The Ruins of Gorlan by Australian writer John Flanagan, which he considered a more valuable work. He facetiously described Kossak-Szczucka's works as "perfectly suited by the Minister of Education to the interests of the modern student", citing such subjects as "the carrying capacity of hens or the richness of plant cover".
