= Goślinowo =

- Village
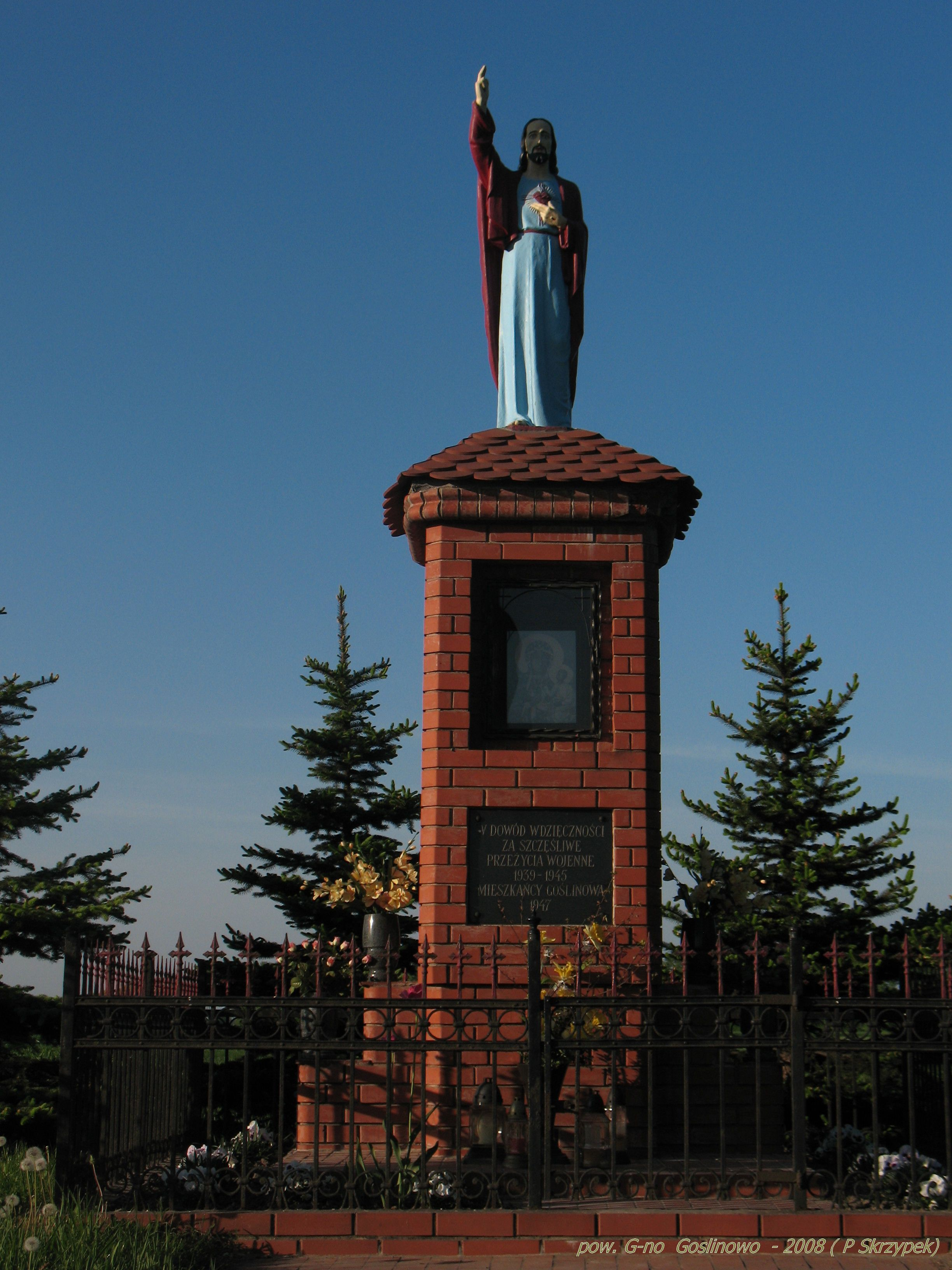
- Wayside shrine in Goślinowo

- Location within Poland
- Coordinates: 52°35′N 17°38′E
- Country: Poland
- Voivodeship: Greater Poland
- County: Gniezno
- Gmina: Gniezno
- Time zone: UTC+1 (CET)
  - Summer (DST): UTC+2 (CEST)
- Vehicle registration: PGN

Goślinowo [ɡɔɕliˈnɔvɔ] is a village in the administrative district of Gmina Gniezno, within Gniezno County, Greater Poland Voivodeship, in west-central Poland.

== History ==
During the German occupation of Poland (World War II), in 1939, the occupiers carried out expulsions of Poles, who were then placed in a transit camp in nearby Gniezno, and afterwards deported to the General Government in the more eastern part of German-occupied Poland, while their houses and farms were handed over to German colonists as part of the Lebensraum policy.

== Transport ==
The Polish S5 highway runs nearby, west of the village.

== Notable people ==
- Ksawery Zakrzewski (1876–1915), Polish physician, independence activist, co-founder of Polish scouting in Greater Poland, director of the "Sokół" Polish Gymnastic Society in Poznań
- Eugeniusz Czajka (1927–2011), Polish Olympic field hockey player
