= Henryk Śniegocki =

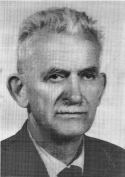
Henryk Śniegocki

Henryk Śniegocki (January 18, 1893, in Kościan – December 1, 1971, in Poznań) was a teacher and a participant in the Greater Poland Uprising (1918–1919). He was a leader of a Regional Scout Command of Wielkopolska in the Polish Scouts in interwar Poland, 1926–1928. He commanded the underground Polish Scout movement during the German occupation of Poland.

== See also ==
- History of the Scout movement in Poland
- Scouting in Poland
