= Władysław Ossowski =

Polish soldier

- Born: November 5, 1925; Iwaszkowice, Stanisławów Voivodeship, Second Polish Republic
- Died: August 5, 2000 (aged 74); Legnica, Lower Silesian Voivodeship, Poland
- Military career
- Allegiance: Polish Underground State
- Branch: Grey Ranks
- Service years: 1939–1940
- Nicknames: Maly Wladzio, Smyk, and Pitolcio
- Unit: Biali Kurierzy
- Conflicts: WWII

Władysław Ossowski (5 November 1925 – 5 August 2000) was a Polish boyscout and member of the White Couriers.

== Biography ==
Ossowski was born on 5 November 1925 in the village of Iwaszkowce. Using the pseudonyms Maly Wladzio, Smyk, and Pitolcio Ossowski, as a 14-year-old boy, he began leading Polish escapees from Soviet-occupied Eastern Poland. Between late 1939 and mid-1940, Ossowski, together with a group of Polish scouts mostly from Lwów, led scores of people across the Soviet-Hungarian border in the Eastern Carpathians. He would lead to Budapest those Poles who wanted to escape Soviet occupation. From Hungary, he would bring newspapers and directives of General Władysław Sikorski. Ossowski, who was born and raised in the borderland area (before the war, there had been the Polish–Czechoslovak border), used his knowledge and skills.

On 8 May 1940 Ossowski was arrested in a house in the village of Komarniki, on the way to Hungary. At first, he was transported to a military prison in Drohobycz, but the trial of the whole group of couriers took place in Lwów. Ossowski was sentenced to death, but due to his young age (14 at the time), the sentence was commuted to 30 years of hard labour. He was taken to a Gulag in Siberia and his nationality was changed from Polish to Ukrainian, which made it impossible for him to return to Poland in later years.

Ossowski was released in 1955 and settled in Krasnoyarsk. In the following years, he was arrested multiple times and his adventures were described in a book written by Marek Celt. Despite living in the Soviet Union for several decades, he never forgot the Bałak jargon of the Polish language.

In 1991 Ossowski and his family were accidentally found and the following year they returned to Poland, after 52 years spent in Siberia. Initially, he settled in Szczecin, where he tried to run a pizzeria, given to him by a generous person. He frequently met local boyscouts, telling them about his adventures. Some time in the late 1990s, Ossowski moved to Legnica, where he died on 5 August 2000.

== See also ==
- Political repression in the Soviet Union
- Rudolf Regner
