= Bialis =

Bialis is a surname. Notable people with the surname include:

- Laura Bialis, American-Israeli filmmaker
- Morris Bialis (1897–1996), American labor union leader

== See also ==
- Biali (disambiguation)
