= Edmund Garratt Gardner =

British historian

Edmund Garratt Gardner, FBA (12 May 1869 – 27 July 1935) was an English scholar and writer, specializing in Italian history and literature. At the beginning of the twentieth century, he was regarded as one of the foremost British Dante scholars.

== Career ==
Gardner was born in Kensington in 1869, the fifth of six children of John Gardner, a member of the stock exchange, and his wife Amy Vernon Garratt. His sister was the Polish scholar Monica Mary Gardner.

He attended Beaumont College in Old Windsor before starting a science degree at University College London. He transferred to Gonville and Caius College, Cambridge in 1887, with the intention of reading medicine. His studies were interrupted in 1890 due to health problems that were to persist throughout his life; during his convalescence in Florence, he received his only formal training in Italian from a Florentine bookseller. He eventually graduated with a B.A., having been granted an aegrotat in Part I of the Natural Sciences Tripos.

Gardner decided to engage in literary studies instead of following a medical career. In 1893 he was teaching English literature at the Cambridge Extension School and had his first article on Dante published in Nature. He proceeded to contribute to a series of popular travel guides on cities in Italy published by J. M. Dent, while producing a steady scholarly output on Dante, Ariosto and their period. His interest in Roman Catholic mysticism resulted in books on Saint Catherine of Siena, Saint Bernard and Dante and the mystics, in which he argued that Dante was "a scholastic in theology but a mystic in religion". He wrote several articles for the Catholic Encyclopedia.

His academic contributions were recognized with his appointment as Barlow lecturer on Dante at University College London between 1910 and 1926. He was promoted to reader in 1918. The following year he became the first holder of the Serena Professorship in Italian Studies at the University of Manchester. In 1922 he won the Serena Medal of the British Academy, established in 1920. From 1923 to 1925 he was Professor of Early Italian Language and Literature at the University of London, becoming Professor of Italian there from 1925 until his retirement in 1934. In 1925 he became a member of the British Academy. A fund was set up in early 1935 to mark his retirement, its main purpose being to finance the Edmund G. Gardner Memorial Prize in Italian Studies, to be awarded every five years by a committee from University College London.

He was appointed an officer of Order of the Crown of Italy in 1921, a commendatore in 1929, and a grand officer in 1935.

Gardner died in 1935 as a result of complications during an operation at Middlesex Hospital, London.

== Selected publications ==
- Gardner, Edmund Garratt. Dante, (1921). Proceedings of the British Academy, vol. 10, 97–112. Master-Mind Lecture.
- Gardner, Edmund Garratt. The story of Florence (1900). London : J.M.Dent. 435 pages.
- Gardner, Edmund Garratt. "Dante's Ten Heavens" (1898). London : A. Constable. 310 pages.
