= Józef Retinger =

Polish diplomat and activist (1888–1960)

Józef Hieronim Retinger
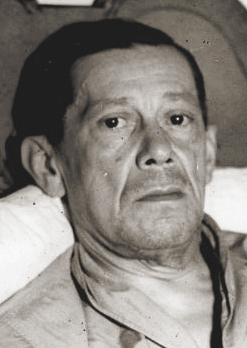
- Józef Retinger, circa 1944
- Born: 17 April 1888; Kraków, Kingdom of Galicia and Lodomeria
- Died: 12 June 1960 (aged 72); London, United Kingdom
- Citizenship: Polish
- Known for: Bilderberg Group, European Movement International
- Awards: Nobel Peace Prize Nomination 1958
- Scientific career
- Fields: Economics, international relations, politics
- Workplaces: Sorbonne University Phd, London School of Economics, Polish government-in-exile

Józef Hieronim Retinger (World War II noms de guerre Salamandra, "Salamander", and Brzoza, "Birch Tree"; 17 April 1888 – 12 June 1960) was a Polish politician, scholar, international political activist with access to some of the leading power brokers of the 20th century, a publicist and writer.

Already as a gifted student in Paris and London he mixed with the leading lights of music and literature. Most notably, he became a friend of compatriot Joseph Conrad. During World War I, the young Retinger became politically active in Austria-Hungary and Russia on behalf of the Polish independence movement. Following a failed attempt to broker peace between Austria-Hungary and the Allies of World War I, he had to retreat to Central America, where he became an economic adviser.

After the outbreak of World War II, he was principal adviser to the Polish government-in-exile. Early in 1944, a daring mission into Occupied Poland by parachute, with the help of British intelligence, added to his air of mystery and subsequent controversy.

A Freemason with a reputation as a grey eminence, after World War II he went on to co-found the European Movement, which led to the establishment of the European Union, and was instrumental in forming the secretive Bilderberg Group. In 1958, he was nominated for the Nobel Peace Prize.

== Early life ==
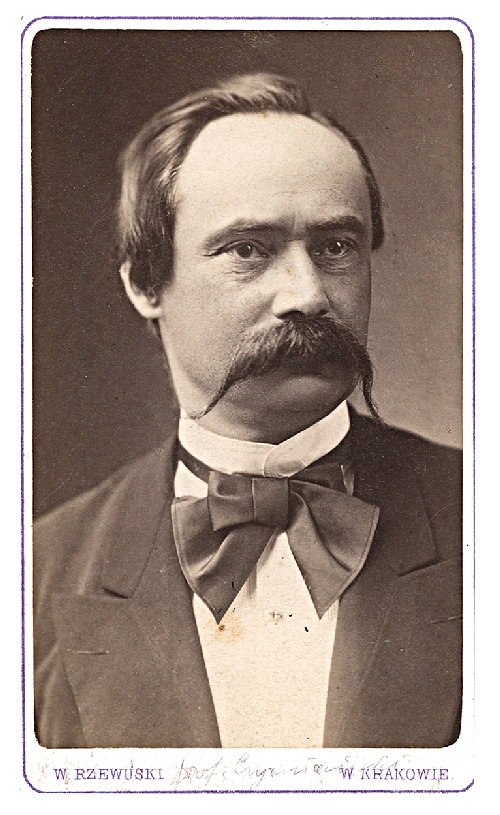
Emilian Czyrniański, Retinger's maternal grandfather, 1878 photo by Walery Rzewuski

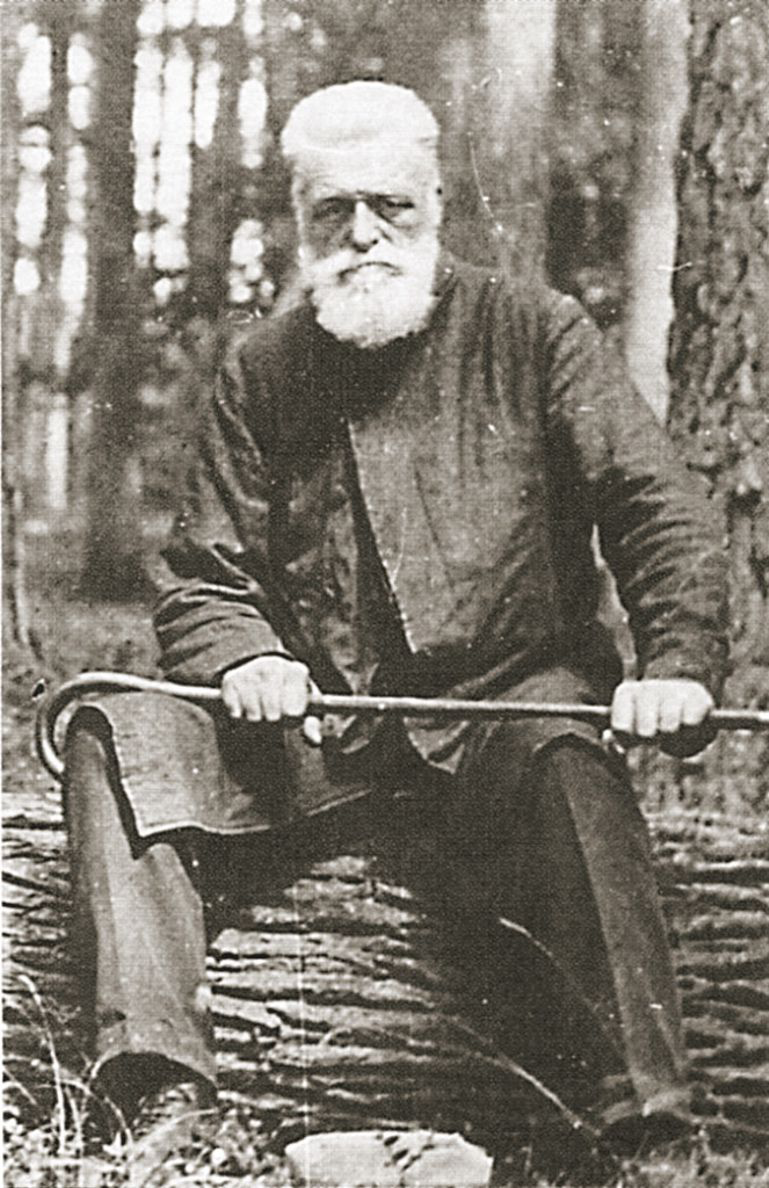
Władysław Zamoyski (1853–1924)

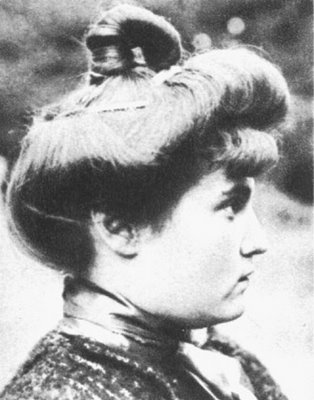
Misia Godebska Sert, Retinger's Parisian cousin

Józef Retinger was born in Kraków, Poland (then part of Austria-Hungary), the youngest of five children: his father had a daughter, Aniela, from a first marriage to Helena Jawornicka. His mother was Maria Krystyna Czyrniańska, daughter of a Greek Catholic Lemko professor of chemistry at the Jagiellonian University. His father, Józef Stanisław Retinger, was the personal legal counsel and successful adviser to French-born Count Władysław Zamoyski. Retinger's great-grandfather, Filip Rettinger, was a Jewish tailor from Tarnów who, with his family, had converted to Catholicism in 1827.

When Count Zamoyski's lawyer grandson died, the Count took the promising youngster, Józef Retinger, into his household and paid for him to attend Kraków's Bartłomiej Nowodworski Lyceum.

Retinger's eldest brother, Emil, became a commander in the Polish Navy, and his son, Witold Retinger, was during World War II (1943–45) stationed in the United Kingdom as a member, then leader, of Squadron 308 of the Polish Air Force. Retinger's brother Juliusz taught physiological chemistry at the University of Chicago and University of Wilno.

Retinger himself initially considered a career in the priesthood, but three months in the Jesuit novitiate in Rome confirmed that he was not suited to the priesthood.

Further financed by Count Zamoyski in 1906, Retinger entered simultaneously the Ecole des sciences politiques and the Sorbonne in Paris and two years later, aged twenty, became the youngest person ever to earn there a Ph.D. in literature.

While in the French capital, armed with introductions from Zamoyski and his own relative, the salonnière and pianist Misia Sert, he moved in intellectual circles and was befriended by among others, André Gide, François Mauriac, Bernard Grasset, Jean Giraudoux, Erik Satie and Maurice Ravel.

His early literary ambitions were stopped in their tracks when he presented his first novel, Les Souffleurs, to André Gide for his opinion. Gide told him: "Joseph, you will never be a writer."

He next went to Munich to study comparative psychology for a year. From there, encouraged by Zamoyski, in 1910 he moved to England, where he entered the London School of Economics for a year's study and began a lobbying operation on behalf of the Polish cause and its populations scattered across three ailing empires. Formally he became Director of the London Office of the Polish National Committee (1912–1914).

Thanks to an introduction by Arnold Bennett, whom he had met in Paris, Retinger developed a close friendship with his older Polish compatriot, the already well-established novelist, Joseph Conrad. Retinger urged Conrad to visit Poland, and on 28 July 1914, the day World War I broke out, Retinger, his wife Otolia, and Conrad and his wife and two sons arrived in Kraków, the two men's childhood stamping grounds (they were alumni of the same secondary school). Due to the closeness of the Russian border (Russia was then allied to Great Britain), the Conrads soon sought greater safety in the Tatra Mountains resort of Zakopane.

Retinger would write about Conrad in his 1943 book, Conrad and His Contemporaries. Historian Norman Davies suggests that it was probably Conrad who introduced the "polyglot and polymath" Retinger to the British intelligence services.

Later Retinger became a personal friend of Major-General Sir Colin Gubbins, wartime head of SOE, and after the war an MI6 "asset".

=== World War I ===
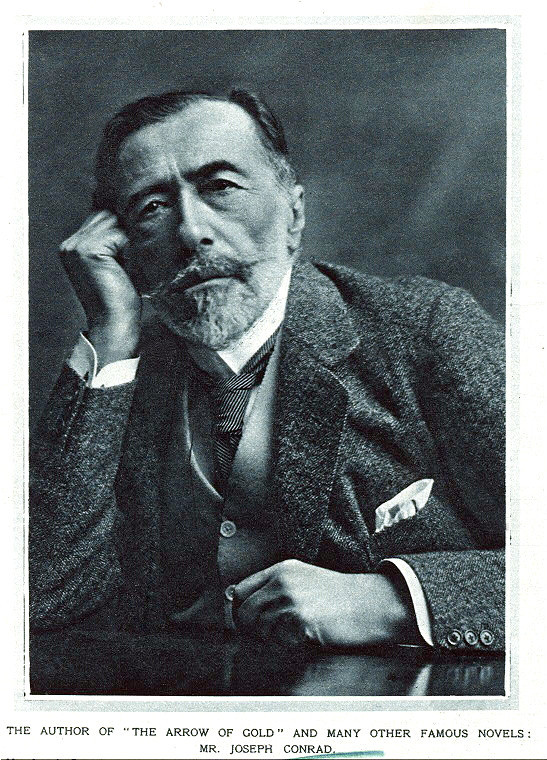
Joseph Conrad

With war clouds closing in, the project of writing a play together with Conrad based on the latter's novel, Nostromo, had to be abandoned as both men hurriedly left Austria-Hungary. Retinger would have been eligible for military call-up in Galicia (no mention of this is made by his biographers).

He put aside literary endeavours and once more assumed the role of a political lobbyist for Poland, publishing pamphlets and travelling between London, Paris, and New York, aided by Conrad in London. In the first years of the war, this was not on the agenda of the major powers.

Retinger looked instead for other potential alliances and political leverage, which led to meetings with leading Zionists of the time, including Chaim Weizmann, Vladimir Zhabotinski, and Nahum Sokolow, who were seeking international recognition and rights for the Jewish diaspora.

In 1916, guided by Zamoyski and with the approval of H. H. Asquith, David Lloyd George, and Georges Clemenceau with his old Parisian connections, Sixtus and Xavier de Bourbon Parme, the Duchess of Montebello and Marquis Boni de Castellane, as well as Zamoyski's friend the Polish General of the Jesuits, Włodzimierz Ledóchowski, Retinger became a "courier" in the secretive European dynastic negotiation suing for peace with Austria. It became known as the Sixtus Affair and was a failure, due to Germany's refusal to cooperate, thus making Austria more dependent on Germany.

In 1917 Retinger met Arthur "Boy" Capel, the half-French dilettante, polo player, and "sponsor" of Coco Chanel. Capel is said to have planted in Retinger's mind the idea of a world federal government based on an Anglo-French alliance.

After concerns for his personal safety due to his "political meddling" in Austria-Hungary and in the emergent Soviet Union, in 1918 Retinger was banned from France, and for several months sought sanctuary in Spain.

== Mexican years ==
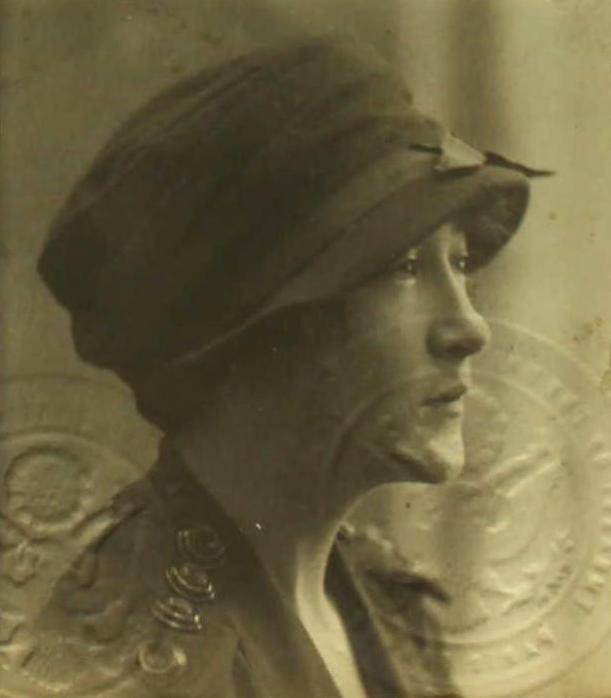
US journalist Jane Anderson, 1917

Retinger travelled on to Cuba and then to Mexico, where he became an unofficial political adviser to union organizer Luis Morones, whom he had fortuitously met crossing the Atlantic, and to President Plutarco Elías Calles.

A glimpse of Retinger, newly divorced and lovelorn for the American journalist Jane Anderson, appears in the biography of another American woman, the communist sympathiser Katherine Anne Porter, a member of the Morones circle. In it he is described as a "Polish intriguer" and "British Marxist". In 1921, while on an obscure mission to the United States to buy saddles, Retinger was arrested and imprisoned in Laredo, and Porter was dispatched from Mexico to get him released. That same year Retinger had proposed that Katherine Porter and her friend Mary Doherty accompany him to Europe to do "collaborative work", an offer that was spurned.

Retinger helped advance Mexico's nationalization of its oil industry in 1928. His activities in Mexico lasted almost seven years and only ended with Calles' fall from power in 1936. They inspired Retinger to write three volumes on the tumultuous events in that Latin American republic. The Mexican years were punctuated by trips back to Europe, where he took on the role of representative in the United Kingdom of the Polish Socialist Party (1924–1928).

In 1926 he married his second wife, Stella, with whom he travelled to Mexico on one occasion. After her death in 1933 his two daughters were left in the care of their maternal grandmother and were estranged from him until the 1950s.

In the rest of the interwar period, he published many contributions in periodicals such as the Polish Wiadomości Literackie (Literary News), on literary and political subjects.

== Building blocks on the table ==
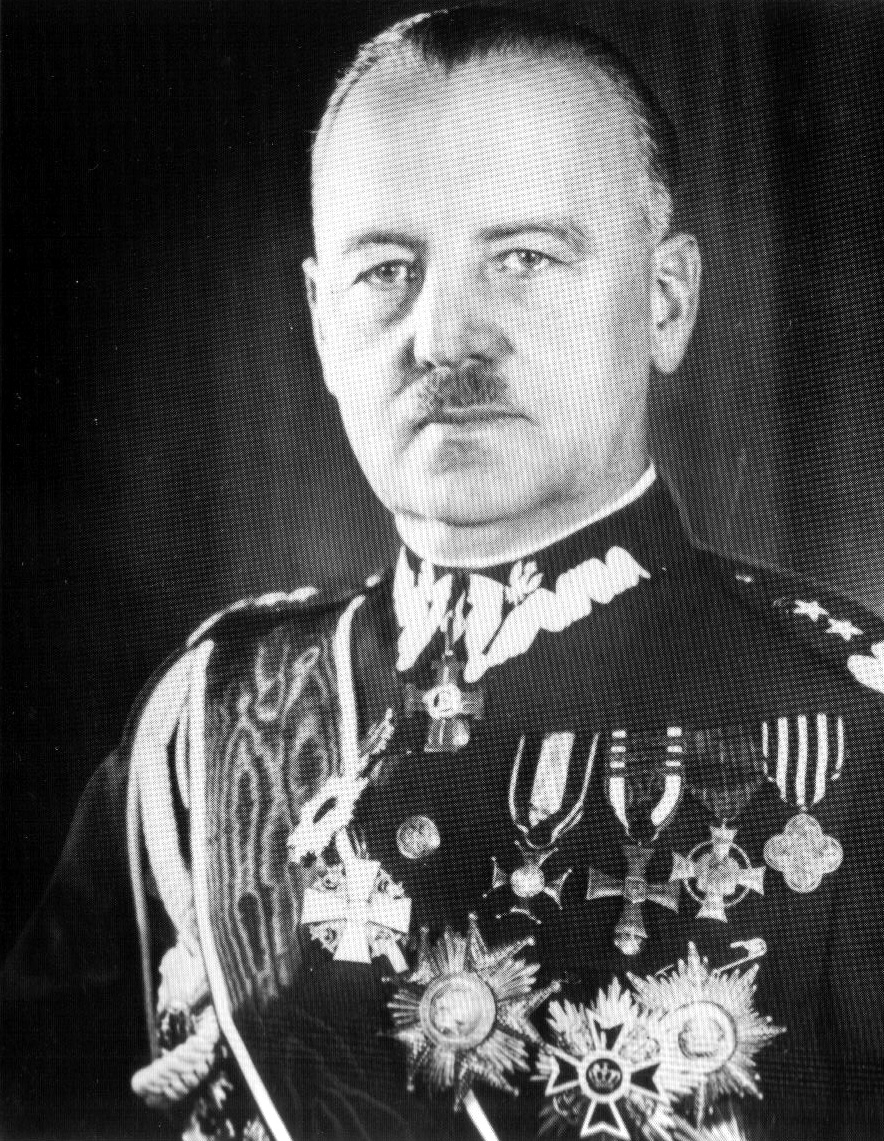
Władysław Sikorski, Polish prime minister in 1923

During World War II, Retinger, who was in London, was involved in arranging for Polish troops to be evacuated to Britain from France. He was asked by Winston Churchill personally to escort Władysław Sikorski by plane to England from France, which had just capitulated to the invading Germans.

Retinger became principal adviser and confidant to the Prime Minister of the Polish Government-in-Exile now established in London. Their political relationship actually went back to 1916 and had been strengthened during Sikorski's earlier brief stint as prime minister, 1922–23, in newly independent Poland.

Sikorski's dependence on Retinger was the greater as Sikorski had no mastery of the English language. Retinger was dispatched to talk with other exiled government representatives in London, who included Marcel-Henri Jaspar, Paul Van Zeeland, and Paul-Henri Spaak, in preparation for a postwar geopolitical landscape. He went on to posit a "Sikorski Plan" consisting of two stages, the first of which was signed in January 1942 and proposed a Polish-Czech confederation. The idea was to expand it into a Central European confederation with Poland and Lithuania, Czechoslovakia as its nucleus around which would be grouped Romania, Hungary, Yugoslavia, and Greece. The agenda behind this was to create a common political blueprint for smaller countries abutting larger European powers and became the basis of a Belgian-Dutch union which would mirror the Polish-Czech arrangement.

This scheme of Retinger's caused problems between London and Moscow. In order not to tread on Soviet toes, the British altered their position and refused to back Sikorski's negotiations with the eight smaller European states. In his speech on the Council of Europe, Winston Churchill BBC radio broadcast on 21 March 1943 referred to the necessity of smaller nations forming groupings, but that it was too early to go into detail. The most Retinger was able to achieve was to push through the Sikorski-Mayski Agreement, signed on 30 July 1941, which provided for the formation of the Anders' army, thus ridding Stalin of the immediate human problem posed by the hundreds of thousands of Polish POWs and deportees from the Soviet occupied Kresy regions of the former Second Polish Republic, who after an arduous odyssey across thousands of miles would eventually end up as the United Kingdom's human problem. This trade-off foreshadowed the Tehran and Yalta Conferences.

== Brushes with death ==
Retinger just avoided perishing at Gibraltar with Władysław Sikorski, in July 1943, when he was not needed in the Premier's Near East troop inspection and was thought better employed in London. The spare seat on the plane went to Sikorski's daughter, who died with her father.

Retinger was devastated by this turn of events. His relations with Sikorski's successor, Stanislaw Mikolajczyk, were much more ambivalent, but he obtained the latter's consent to go on a special SOE mission to Poland in April 1944.

With an SOE brief and without prior training, Retinger, aged 56, parachuted into German-occupied Poland with 2nd Lt. Tadeusz Chciuk-Celt in Operation Salamander to meet with Polish underground figures, to deliver money to the Polish underground, and to "explain to his fellow Poles in the homeland 'how we are going to lose this war'". Following at least one assassination attempt on him, Retinger expressed his frustration:

You know why I came. The [Underground] Delegate knows as well.... They know that I only want to convince them that it will be necessary in the future to cooperate with the Communists, because no English are coming here, only Russians. If we do not get along with them somehow, it will be a terrible tragedy, because we well know what Stalin and the NKVD are. And it's about trying to make people here understand this fact. And they want to murder me!

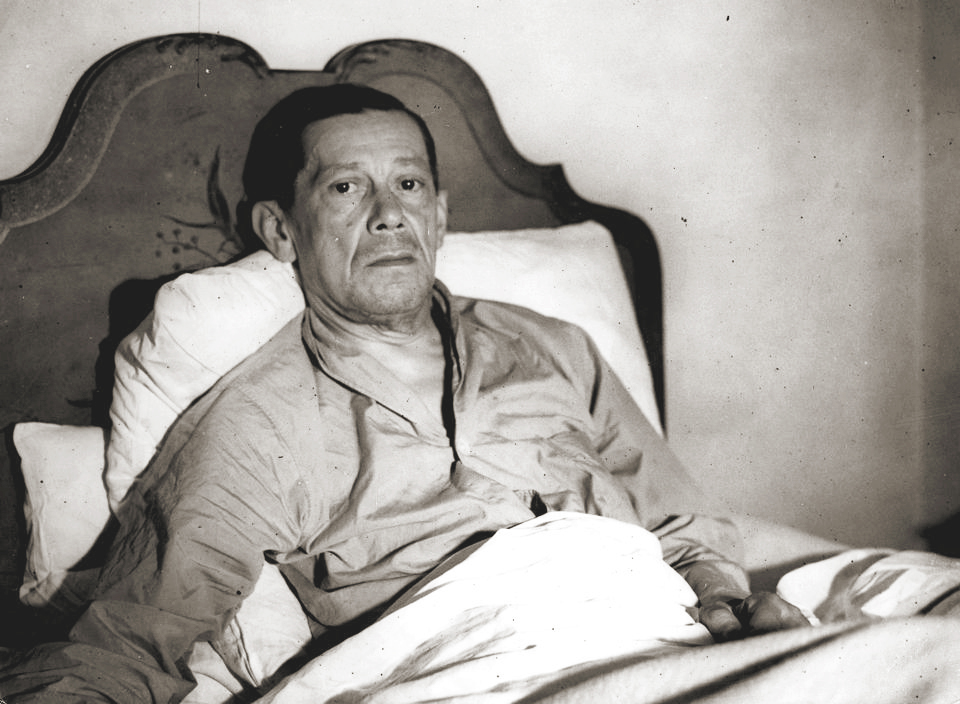
Retinger recovering from poisoning, ca. 1944

The latter reference was to elements in the Polish underground Home Army who were convinced Retinger was not acting in the interests of his country and should therefore be "removed". One apparent attempt to liquidate him was allegedly based on a "death sentence" sanctioned by General Kazimierz Sosnkowski. It was foiled by the intervention of an old friend and Home Army member, Tadeusz Gebethner. During his visit in Poland, there was also a failed attempt to kill him with poison.

On return to London, he spent some time in the Dorchester Hotel in London's Park Lane, recovering from his trip ordeal, which left him lame in one leg for the rest of his life, possibly due to polyneuritis brought on by the poison. His first visitor at the Dorchester was Foreign Secretary Sir Anthony Eden.

Immediately after the war, in 1945–46, Retinger travelled to Warsaw with emergency aid for the capital's population. It consisted largely of tons of British and US army surplus, such as equipment, blankets, and field kitchens. When his erstwhile military escort from Operation Salamander, Tadeusz Chciuk, and his new wife Ewa were arrested as subversives by the Polish communist security service, Retinger allegedly appealed to Vyacheslav Molotov in Moscow to have them released. Apparently the personal intervention succeeded. In 1948 the Chciuks became refugees in Germany.

=== Unwanted intrusion ===
Dark days followed World War II when tensions rose between former Western and Eastern allies and in April 1946 Retinger's flat in Bayswater, West London, was broken into and his and his secretary's files ransacked by persons unknown. He reported the matter to Scotland Yard, but the Metropolitan Police were not overly bothered. Retinger escalated his complaint and ended up being interviewed by the British security services. His view was that the newly established communist embassy of the Polish People's Republic was responsible for the break-in.

From the moment that Churchill made his "Iron Curtain" speech in Fulton, Missouri, in April 1946, Retinger turned his efforts to a modified European project he had harboured for decades.

== Vision for Europe ==
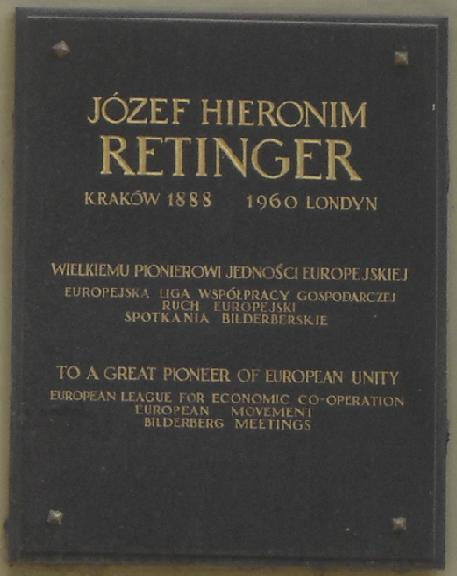
Kraków plaque commemorating Retinger, "great pioneer of European unity".

After World War II, Retinger feared another devastating war in Europe, this time fought between "Russia" and "the Anglo-Saxons". He became a leading advocate of European unification as a means of securing peace. He helped found both the European Movement and the Council of Europe, somewhat to the dismay of the philosopher Count Richard Coudenhove-Kalergi, the post-World War I anti-bolshevist founder of the Paneuropean Union movement.

Retinger, with his connections in Holland, Belgium, and Switzerland (he was a friend of Denis de Rougemont), took his cue from Winston Churchill's 1946 Zürich speech and found fertile ground with thirteen British Conservative members of Parliament who backed the idea of a loose European association of states. Retinger was the driving force in the creation of the European League for Economic Cooperation (initially called the Independent League of Economic Cooperation).

He subsequently approached Duncan Sandys, Churchill's son-in-law and chairman of the United Europe Movement, about improving cooperation among the various organisations pursuing European unity. They agreed to organise a small meeting of their two organisations with the Nouvelle Equipes Internationales and the European Union of Federalists. This was held in Paris on 20 July 1947, when it was agreed to establish the Committee for the Coordination of the International Movements for European Unity. In December 1947 this was renamed the International Committee of the Movements for European Unity, with Sandys as Executive Chairman and Retinger as its Honorary Secretary.

They organised the 1948 Hague Congress which brought together the two camps of those for a unified Europe and those in favour of a federal Europe.

During the congress, Retinger networked assiduously among the delegates, who included the Vatican diplomat Giovanni Montini, future Pope Paul VI. Ensuing discussions led eventually to the formation in 1951 of a European Coal and Steel Community.

=== Creator of Bilderberg ===
Retinger was the initiator and architect of the informal Bilderberg conferences in 1952-54 and was their permanent secretary until his premature death in London in 1960. The original group which met in the eponymous Dutch hotel in 1954 was gathered by Retinger and included David Rockefeller, Denis Healey with Prince Bernhard of the Netherlands, as chairman. The purpose was to stimulate understanding between Europe and the US as the Cold War developed by bringing together financiers, industrialists, politicians and opinion formers. All discussions were to be strictly under Chatham House Rules. A founding member of the group, later British Labour Foreign Secretary, Healey, described the secretive Bilderberg meetings as the "brainchild" of Retinger.

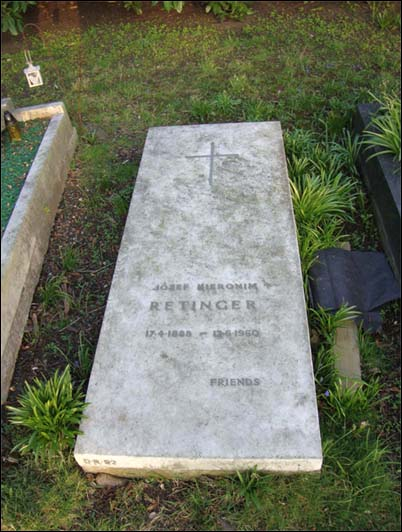
Grave, North Sheen Cemetery, London

Despite eschewing any distinctions or medals throughout his life, in 1958 he was nominated for the Nobel Peace Prize. He died in poverty of lung cancer. He was buried at North Sheen Cemetery in the presence of five British cabinet ministers as well as of his two younger daughters who were finally reconciled with him. According to the oration of Sir Edward Beddington-Behrens, Retinger not only had special access to 10 Downing Street but also to the White House.

Retinger's long-time personal assistant and the editor of his posthumous memoirs, John Pomian, actually Jan Pomian-Bławdziewicz, was another Polish émigré in London, later a director of the Heim gallery in London's St James's, owned by the influential Polish art historian and philanthropist, Andrzej Ciechanowiecki.

== Personal life ==
Retinger married twice. In 1912 he wed the well-born Otolia Zubrzycka (divorced 1921, died 1984), with whom he had a daughter, Malina (later Puchalska). In 1926 he wed Stella Morel (died 1933) – daughter of French-born pacifist and Dundee member of Parliament, E.D. Morel, and Mary, née Richardson – with whom he had two daughters, Marya (later Fforde) and Stasia (later French). Among his grandchildren are David French – translator into English of Andrzej Sapkowski's Witcher Saga – and fantasy novelist Jasper Fforde.

During World War I and after, Retinger appears to have fallen under the spell of several women, especially the American journalist Jane Anderson, a supposed lover of Joseph Conrad. Retinger's own liaison with Anderson brought about the breakdown of Retinger's marriage to Otolia and drove a wedge between him and his friend Conrad. However, Conrad biographer John Stape gives an alternative version for the cooling of relations between the two men, suggesting that as Retinger's enthusiasms were not shared by the novelist, shortly after the war – without Retinger's charming wife Otolia by his side – Retinger's proneness to exaggeration and tactlessness made him less socially acceptable.

== Controversy ==
Over the decades since his 1960 death, the left-leaning Retinger continues to draw fascination and controversy with his political skill, his apparently selfless single-mindedness, and his lasting institutional legacy in Europe and beyond. Adam Pragier, a notable Polish exile and trenchant political commentator (and a secondary-school contemporary of Retinger's), has described him as "a sort of adventurer, but in the good sense of the word". On the other hand, detractors impugn his influence due to alleged connections, with deeply secret and malign factions, for which there is so far no reliable evidence. He remains an enigma, and probably the one substantial contributor to post-war European peace who has no physical monument.

In 2000 The Daily Telegraph's Ambrose Evans-Pritchard revealed, from declassified US Government records, that:

The leaders of the European Movement – Retinger, the visionary Robert Schuman and the former Belgian prime minister Paul-Henri Spaak – were all treated as hired hands by their American sponsors. The US role was handled as a covert operation. ACUE's funding came from the Ford and Rockefeller Foundations as well as business groups with close ties to the US government.

This revelation touching on Cold War circumstances was subsequently analysed in greater detail in 2003 by Le Figaro commentator Rémi Kauffer. However, as professor Hugh Wilford shows, the initiative to win American backing for a "United States of Europe" came neither from Allen Dulles, deputy chief, then chief of the CIA, nor from Senator William Fulbright, chairman of the American Committee on United Europe, but from European lobbyists of disparate motivation, namely Coudenhove-Kalergi and Retinger, the latter eclipsing the former due to Retinger's close connection with Winston Churchill on European matters.

Retinger's plan was that the United States should be integral to political and economic support for a war-damaged Western Europe. As "head of casting" for his project, he set about finding key Americans to collaborate with him, among them Charles Douglas Jackson, Time-Life publisher in the 1940s and one-time head of propaganda at the Eisenhower White House.

Retinger has inspired disparate opinions. He was a figure whose allegiances, like his roots, remain obscure and whose accounts of himself varied according to his audience, thus undercutting his reliability – as reflected in various Joseph Conrad biographies and numerous other sources, including the considered, annotated review, by Norbert Wójtowicz of Poland's Institute of National Remembrance, of Marek Celt's 2006 posthumously published Z Retingerem do Warszawy i z powrotem. Raport z podziemia 1944 [To Warsaw with Retinger and Back. A Report from the Underground 1944], edited by Wojciech Frazik. The disparity in views on Retinger, despite the perception of some personality flaws, does not alter Retinger's mature postwar European legacy.

== Selected works ==
By J. H. Retinger:

- Le conte fantastique dans le romantisme français [Fantastical Tales in the French Romantic Tradition] (in French). Genève: Slatkine Reprints, 1973. 1908.
- Histoire de la littérature française du romantisme à nos jours [The History of French Literature from Romanticism to the Present Day] (in French). Paris: B. Grasset. 1911.
- The Poles and Prussia. London. 1913. available at University of Leeds Library
- La Pologne et l'Équilibre européen [Poland and the Stability of Europe] (in French). Paris. 1916.
- Morones of Mexico; a history of the labour movement in that country. London: The Labour Pub. Co. Ltd. 1926.
- Tierra mexicana; the history of land and agriculture in ancient and modern Mexico. London: N. Douglas. 1928.
- Polacy w cywilizacjach zagranicznych [Poles in Foreign Civilizations] (in Polish). Warsaw. 1934.
- "Historja i polityka: Nowy czynnik w dyplomacji międzynarodowej" [History and Politics: A new factor in international diplomacy]. Wiadomości Literackie (50) (in Polish). 4 December 1938.
- "Historja i polityka: Zastój w międzynarodowej działalności Rosji" [History and Politics: Suspension of Russian activity in international relations]. Wiadomości Literackie (51) (in Polish). 11 December 1938.
- All about Poland: facts, figures, documents. London: Minerva Pub. Co. 1941.
- Conrad and His Contemporaries. New York: Roy. 1942 [First published by Minerva, London, 1941].
- The European Continent? Address given to the Royal Institute of International Affairs in London (PDF). London. 7 May 1946.
- The Bilderberg Group. Hertfordshire, UK. 1959.
- Under Polish eyes. United Kingdom: Joseph Conrad Society. 1975.

About Retinger:

- Poraj, Stanisław (19 June 1938). "The knight among nations". Tydzień Literacki Polski Zbrojnej, 2 (24) (in Polish).
- de Rougemont, Denis (1961). Retinger, J.H. (ed.). A Biographical Sketch. In Tribute to a Great European. Geneva: Centre Europeén de la Culture. pp. 20–50.
- Siemaszko, Zbigniew Sebastian (1967). "Retinger w Polsce 1944 r.". Zeszyty Historyczne, 12 (in Polish). Paris.
- Pomian, John, ed. (1972). Józef Retinger: Memoirs of an Eminence Grise. Sussex University Press/Chatto & Windus. ISBN 0-85621-002-1. OCLC 844436367..
- Nowak, Jan (1978). Kurier z Warszawy (in Polish). London: Odnowa. ISBN 0-903705-37-0.
- Józef Hieronim Retinger (1888-1960) (in Polish). Vol. XXXI. Polski Słownik Biograficzny. 1988–1989.
- In remembrance of Joseph Retinger 1988-1960, Initiator of the European League for Economic Cooperation. Brussels: European League for Economic Cooperation. 1996.
- Grosbois, Thierry (1999). "L'action de Józef Retinger en faveur de l'idée européenne 1940-46". Revue Européenne d'Histoire (in French). 6 (34).
- Kalicki, Włodzimierz (2010). "Gracz, który budował Europę" [The Player who built Europe]. Gazeta Wyborcza (in Polish) (219).
- Marek Celt; Jan Chciuk-Celt (2013). Parachuting into Poland, 1944: Memoir of a Secret Mission with Jozef Retinger. McFarland. ISBN 978-1-4766-03384.
- Podgórski, Bogdan (2013). Józef Retinger – prywatny polityk [Józef Retinger - a private politician] (in Polish). Universitas. ISBN 97883-242-2351-0.

== See also ==
- European Movement
- European Union
- List of governments in exile during World War II
- List of Poles: Politics, Diplomacy
