= Eugeniusz Czajka =

Polish field hockey player

- Born: 25 March 1927; Goślinowo
- Died: 5 February 2011 (aged 83)

Eugeniusz Czajka (25 March 1927 – 5 February 2011) was a Polish field hockey player who competed in the 1952 Summer Olympics. He was born in Goślinowo, Gniezno County. He was part of the Polish field hockey team, which competed in the 1952 Olympic tournament.
