= Ksawery Zakrzewski =

Polish physician and activist

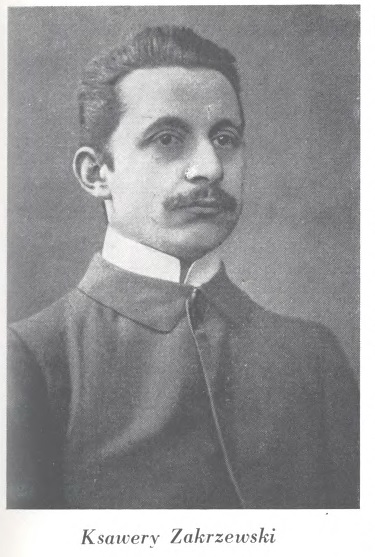
Ksawery Zakrzewski

Ksawery Faustyn Ignacy Zakrzewski (15 February 1876 in Wełna [now Goślinowo] – 18 November 1915 in Poznań) was a Polish physician, independence activist, director of Poznań's Polish Gymnastic Society "Falcon", co-editor of biweekly magazine Sokół, co-founder (with Marian Seyda) of magazine Kurier Poznański. According to Bernard Chrzanowski, Zakrzewski was an initiator and co-creator of scouting in Greater Poland. He was one of the main organiser of Polish scouting in the Prussian partition of Poland.

His 1903 medical doctoral thesis was titled Zur Statistik und Casuistik der Rückenmarkstumoren (On the Statistics and Casuistry of Spinal Cord Tumors).

== See also ==
- History of the Scout movement in Poland
