= Walls (scout group) =

Clandestine Polish Scouting organization

- Mury
- Leaders: Zofia Janczy; Józefa Kantor; Maria Rydarowska
- Dates active: November 30, 1941–April 30, 1945
- Country: Nazi Germany
- Allegiance: Polish Underground State
- Active regions: Ravensbrück
- Political position: Anti-fascism
- Size: 100
- Part of: ZHP

Mury (The Walls) was a clandestine Girl Scouts group organized by young Polish women who were political prisoners in the Ravensbrück concentration camp. The group, led by Scout Group Leader Józefa Kantor, was established on 30 November 1941.

At first, Mury consisted of a small number of patriotic Girl Scouts. Then, later on, it grew to five units with about 100 young women. Their main activities included organizing food and medical supplies for the sick fellow prisoners, moral, psychological and religious support for the group members and other women in the concentration camp.

The members of the group held regular meetings in various blocks in the concentration camp, where they received not only new tasks and daily instructions from the group leaders, but also acquired Scouting knowledge and high school education from fellow prisoners who had been experienced academic teachers (and subsequently incarcerated in the concentration camp as political prisoners).

Based on the Nazis' incomplete transport list Zugangsliste consisting of 25,028 names of women sent by Nazis to the camp, it is estimated that inmates of Ravensbrück ethnic structure was the following: Poles 24.9%, Germans 19.9%, Jews 15.1%, Russians 15.0%, French 7.3%, Gypsies 5.4%, other 12.4%. The Gestapo categorized the inmates as follows: political 83,54%, anti-social 12,35%, criminal 2,02%, Jehovah's Witnesses 1.11%, racial defilement 0.78%, other 0.20%. The list is one of the most important documents, preserved in the last moments of the camp operation by members of the Mury Girl Guides unit. The rest of the camp documents were burned by escaping SS overseers in pits or in the crematorium.

== See also ==
- Grey Ranks
