= Józefa Kantor =

Polish Scout leader

- Born: March 6, 1896; Tarnów, Austria-Hungary
- Died: September 25, 1990 (aged 94)
- Resting place: Szopienice-Burowiec
- Other name: Ziuta
- Occupation: Teacher
- Organization: ZHP
- Known for: Founding the Walls group
- Parents: Franciszek (father); Antonina née Jaworska (mother)
- Relatives: Tadeusz Kantor

Józefa Kantor (6 March 1896, Tarnów - 25 September 1990) was a Polish teacher, Scoutmaster (harcmistrzyni), and founder of the Girl Scouts group "Mury". She was the aunt of the painter Tadeusz Kantor.

Kantor was arrested on 9 November 1940 by the Gestapo and sent to the Ravensbrück concentration camp (inmate number 7261) Where she is referred to as "Rector" because of her spiritual guidance, where she established the secret Girl Scout group "Mury" in November 1941.
