= Egon Naganowski =

Egon Naganowski (31 March 1913, Innsbruck – 23 January 2000, Poznań) is a Polish literary critic, essayist and literary translator (mostly from German).

He was married Irena Naganowska, also translator, who co-worked with him.

== Books ==
- Magiczny klucz: opowieść o życiu i twórczości młodego Martina Nexø (1958)
- Telemach w labiryncie świata: o twórczości Jamesa Joyce’a (1962)
- Podróż bez końca: opowieść o życiu i twórczości Roberta Musila (1980)
- Robert Musil (1980)
- Poznań'56 (1981, collection of essays)
- Młodzieńczy eros i inne wspomnienia z dawnych lat (1992, memoirs)

== Awards ==
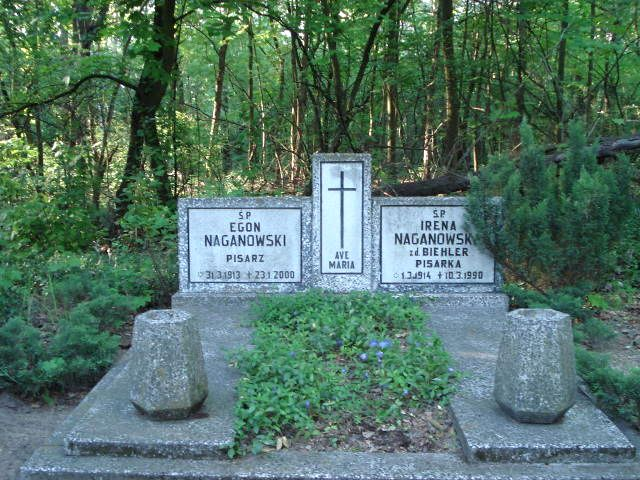
Burial place of Naganowskis

- 1988: Karl Dedecius Prize For Polish translators from German, Germany
- 1990: Officer's Cross of the Order of Polonia Restituta
- 1993: Artistic Award of the City of Poznań
- 1987 Austrian Cross of Honour for Science and Art, First Class
