= Tadeusz Chciuk-Celt =

Polish journalist

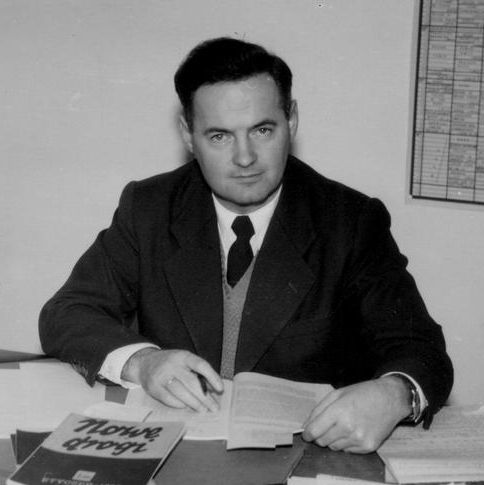
- Tadeusz Chciuk-Celt in the 1960s, at his desk at Radio Free Europe.
- Born: 17 October 1916; Drohobytsch, Austria-Hungary (now Drohobych, Ukraine)
- Died: 10 April 2001 (aged 84); Munich, Germany
- Other name: Marek Celt
- Education: Jan Kazimierz University
- Occupations: Underground soldier, journalist, non-fiction writer
- Known for: "Silent-unseen" special forces

Tadeusz Chciuk-Celt (17 October 1916 – 10 April 2001) was a World War II Polish Silent Unseen, and later a journalist and author.

His two parachute missions into German-occupied Poland and his courage were honored with the order of Virtuti Militari.

After the war he was persecuted by Polish Stalinists, and in 1948 he left Poland. Chciuk-Celt worked for four decades at Radio Free Europe. He also wrote several books, beginning in 1945 with By Parachute to Warsaw under the pen name Marek Celt.

After the collapse of the Soviet Union he was declared a national hero of Poland, and on 28 May 2001 he was interred in Warsaw. Seven years later, on 5 September 2008, he was posthumously awarded one of Poland's highest honors, the Commander's Cross with Star of the Order of Polonia Restituta.

== Early life and education ==
Tadeusz Chciuk was born on 17 October 1916 to the Polish Catholic family of Michal Chciuk and his wife, Maria; the fourth of their five children in the city of Drohobycz in the crumbling Austro-Hungarian Empire. In the reborn Poland Chciuk became active in the Polish Scouting Association from 1927 on, and was a Scoutmaster from 1936. After graduating from Jagiello High School, he went on to obtain his master's degree in law at the Jan Kazimierz University in Lwow in 1939. He also got an intermediate degree in music at the Szymanowski Conservatory in Lwow.

== Career ==
=== World War II ===
During the World War II, Tadeusz Chciuk took active part in fighting the Soviet and German occupiers. He was involved in the Biali Kurierzy (or White Couriers) who specialized in smuggling small groups of people across the border into Hungary. In May 1940, he joined up with the Polish Army units in France, and after France fell, he was eventually stationed in Scotland, where he finished Artillery Officers' Candidate School with the rank of 2nd Lieutenant. He also completed parachute training at RAF Ringway, Manchester England (this base was used for male and female agents of the Special Operations Executive as well as all [60,000] allied paratroopers trained in Europe during World War II).

==== Operation "Jacket" ====
On the night of 27 December 1941, Tadeusz Chciuk took part in Operation Jacket, in which a small group of special agents (called Cichociemni, lit. The Silent Dark Ones) parachuted into Poland. They were apprehended by the German Grenzschutz and a firefight ensued, resulting in several casualties. He was sent as an emissary of the Polish Government in Exile, which was led in London by General Wladyslaw Sikorski. His code name was "Celt," actually an anagram of his initials and those of his fiancée, Ewa Lovell. His mission was to make a report to the General on the state of the Polish underground. He spent several months in Poland making a detailed assessment of the situation. In addition to meetings with the Chief Delegate (the acting head of the government) and political and underground leaders, he also smuggled himself into the Warsaw Ghetto and witnessed horrifying scenes. Owing to the many challenges involved with getting back to London through German-occupied Europe, it took him a whole year to get back with his report. During his travels (via Hungary, Croatia, Switzerland and France), he took on a series of disguises, including wearing a full Roman Catholic priest's garb and claiming to be the Hungarian priest Andor Varga, and claiming to be a French railroad maintenance worker. He was captured by the Spanish Guardia Civil while crossing into Spain from Andorra, and was held in jail in Gerona until he was transferred to a concentration camp in Miranda de Ebro. A yellow fever epidemic raged there, and Chciuk escaped when an inmate who had qualified for release died and Chciuk claimed to be that man. He made his way to Gibraltar and was flown back to London. (General Sikorski died in a plane crash while departing Gibraltar en route to London.) On returning to Great Britain in June 1943, Chciuk submitted his report to the military authorities. He was one of the first agents to return with first-hand accounts of the systematic and total extermination of Poland's Jewish population by the Germans. He was awarded Poland's highest military distinction for outstanding valor, the Virtuti Militari.

==== Operation "Salamander" ====
After working for several months at the underground radio station Świt, which broadcast to Poland from England, Tadeusz Chciuk was summoned by the Prime Minister of the Polish Government in Exile, Stanislaw Mikolajczyk, to go on a second Cichociemny parachute mission to Poland as Mikolajczyk's personal emissary. His code name was "Sulima," but he was also called "Celt." The mission departed from the RAF Base at Brindisi on the night of 3 April 1944. His mission was two-fold: first, to have urgent talks with the Chief Delegate and other key political figures, apprising them of the results of the Teheran Conference, which were very unfavorable indeed for Poland, and of the pressing need to come to some sort of diplomatic understanding with the Soviets; and second, to see to the safety of the other man on the mission, the political advisor Dr. Józef Retinger, code named "Salamander," who parachuted into Poland with him at the age of 56 and was also there to talk to the key political players. They were airlifted back out of Poland in dramatic circumstances in the early hours of 26 July 1944, in Operation Wildhorn III.

=== Postwar experiences and Radio Free Europe ===
Tadeusz Chciuk-Celt was sent to Poland in December 1945 as the Secretary of the Demobilization Mission, along with Dr. Jozef Retinger, the director of this mission, which distributed many tons of American and British military surplus equipment to Poland. He married Ewa Lovell in Kraków within days of his return, on 19 December 1945. They were both arrested by the UB (Secret Police of the Ministry of Public Security of Poland) in April 1946, and held as prisoners for several months, until the personal intervention of Stanislaw Mikolajczyk secured their release. After that, he worked in Kraków for the Polish Peasants' Party (PSL) until the Communists started cracking down hard. With his young wife and one-year-old daughter Aleksandra, taking only what they could carry, Tadeusz Chciuk-Celt fled Poland in September 1948, not to return for 43 years. Many of his friends and colleagues spent the next eight years in prison in Poland.

After staying in United Nations refugee camps in Austria, the young family eventually made their way to Paris, where they would live for three years in severe poverty. While Ewa finished her university studies at the Sorbonne and gave birth to a son, Luc, Tadeusz worked for the emigre PSL and took whatever odd jobs he could.

In 1952, Tadeusz Chciuk-Celt was invited to be one of the founders of the Polish section of Radio Free Europe, a U.S.-funded station based in Munich, broadcasting news, commentary and entertainment to the countries behind the Iron Curtain. He was an editor and commentator, with a particular focus on rural and agricultural matters. His on-air name was Michal Lasota. His family grew in Munich, with the birth of daughter Maria in 1954 and son Jan in 1955. He stayed with R.F.E. throughout the fifties, sixties and seventies, and was the deputy director of the Polish desk by the time he retired in 1983. He also stayed with the emigre PSL, and was its last President when it was merged with the original PSL in Poland in 1991.

== Later life and death ==
After retiring from Radio Free Europe in 1983, Tadeusz Chciuk-Celt remained in Germany and wrote several books in Polish. He died in Munich on 10 April 2001, aged 84.

== Awards and decorations ==
- Silver Cross of Virtuti Militari (1943)
- Commander's Cross with Star of the Order of Polonia Restituta (posthumously, 2008)
- Commander's Cross of the Order of Polonia Restituta (1994)
- Cross of Valour (twice)
- Cross of the Home Army (1973)
- Cross of the Peasant Battalions (1998)
- Army Medal for War (four times)
- September Campaign Cross (1985)
- Cross of Merit for Polish Scouting and Guiding Association (1996)

== Bibliography ==
- By Parachute to Warsaw, Marek Celt -pen name of Tadeusz Chciuk-Celt, 1945, Polish National Hero & wartime agent. The author's eye-witness account of conditions in Poland on his second parachute courier mission in April–July 1944. Published in London by Dorothy Crisp & Co Ltd
- Biali Kurierzy ("The White Couriers") described his activities as a courier in the first months of the war.
- Koncert ("Concerto for Four Colts") was an account of the first days of Operation "Jacket," and described a dramatic firefight with German forces.
- Raport z Podziemia 1942 ("Report From the Underground 1942") describes the state of the Polish Underground at that time as well as his own adventures.
- Raport z Podziemia 1944—Z Retingerem do Warszawy i z Powrotem tells the story of Operation "Salamander" and his interaction with Dr. Retinger. It has been translated into English and was published by McFarland Publishing Co. in June 2013 as Parachuting into Poland, 1944 -- Memoir of a Secret Mission with Józef Retinger.
