= Morris Bialis =

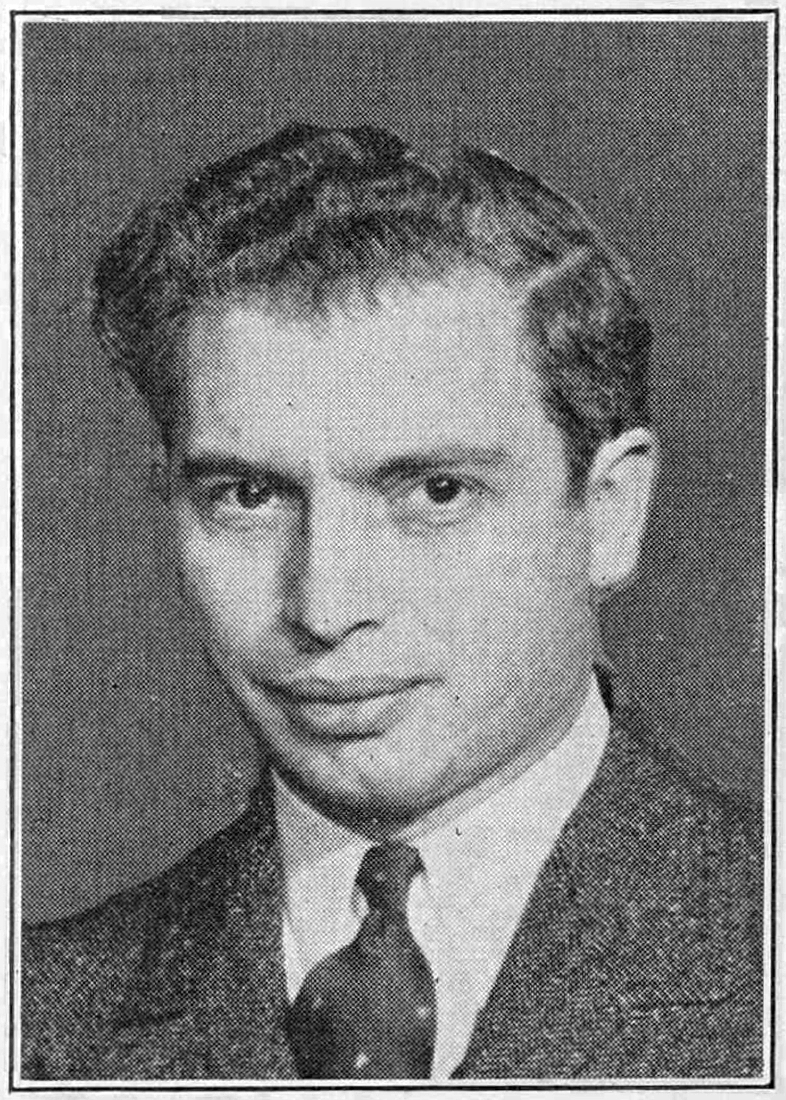
- Bialis c. 1936
- Born: January 14, 1897; Tikten, Congress Poland, Russian Empire
- Died: January 31, 1997 (aged 100); Escondido, California, U.S.
- Occupation: Labor leader
- Known for: Vice-President of the Chicago Federation of Labor and ILGWU

Morris Bialis (January 14, 1897 in Tikten, Poland – January 31, 1996 in Escondido, California) was a labor leader in International Ladies' Garment Workers' Union, the Jewish Labor Committee, and the Chicago Federation of Labor.

Morris Bialis was a vice-president of the ILGWU and the Chicago Federation of Labor. Bialis arrived in the United States from Poland in May 1910, and by 1920, he was recording secretary of the Chicago Cloakmakers Union Local 5 and Executive Board member and delegate of the Chicago Joint Board. Bialis served as a business agent (1922–1923) and later manager of the Chicago Joint Board. In 1928, he was elected vice-president of the ILGWU, and in 1934 was appointed director of the Midwest Region. Bialis retired from the ILGWU in 1976.

In addition to his work with the ILGWU, Bialis was involved with numerous organizations throughout his career. He was trustee of Roosevelt University, board member of the Chicago Municipal Tuberculosis Sanitarium, member of the Mayor's Commission on Human Relations, vice president of the Jewish Labor Committee, chairman of the Chicago Federation of Labor and Cook County CIO Labor Conference, and member of the Illinois Advisory Council on the Improvement of the Economic and Social Status of Older People. Bialis was named executive board member of the Chicago Federation of Labor in 1955, and in 1973, was named the organization's vice president.

== Sources ==
ILGWU. Communications Department biography files. 5780/177. Kheel Center for Labor-Management Documentation and Archives, Martin P. Catherwood Library, Cornell University.

"Morris Bialis, 100, Labor Union Official." Chicago Tribune. 7 Feb. 1997. Web. 26 Jan. 2011.
