= Monica Mary Gardner =

English Polonist and biographer (1873–1941)

- Born: 26 June 1873; Roehampton, England
- Died: 16 April 1941 (aged 67); London, England
- Writing career
- Subject: Translator of Polish literature

Monica Mary Gardner (26 June 1873 – 16 April 1941) was an English writer on Poland and Polish writers and a translator of Polish literature.

== Life and work ==
Gardner was born in 1873 at Roehampton Lane, Roehampton, Surrey. the eldest of the six children of John Gardner, a member of the stock exchange, and his wife Amy Vernon Garratt. Her brother was the Italian scholar Edmund Garratt Gardner.

Gardner studied the Polish language and literature after being intrigued at school by Bonnie Prince Charlie's mother who was the Polish aristocrat Clementina Sobieska. In 1899 she began to get assistance in her obsession for Polish and Poland by the writer Edmund Naganowski. He was able to support her until the First World War prevented further communication. Naganowski was to die in 1915. Gardner taught herself how to research sources in Polish and how to find out more about Poland. Her first monograph in 1911 was on Adam Mickiewicz who was regarded as the national poet of Poland.

She followed this with more books on her single theme. She was known as one of the few English speaking writers who studied Polish literature and history. She wrote Poland: a Study in National Idealism in 1915 and The Anonymous Poet of Poland: Zygmunt Krasiński in 1919. In 1922 she and her brother made what may have been her only visit to Poland. They visited Poznań and Kraków. She wrote The Patriot Novelist of Poland: Henryk Sienkiewicz in 1926. The latter was said to have been published to coincide with the return of Sienkiewicz's body from Switzerland to be encrypted in Warsaw Cathedral.

In between the wars Gardner lived with her mother and her brother who was dedicated to Italy and Italian. Monica's knowledge and expertise made their house a place to visit by notable visiting Poles.

With the outbreak of World War Two, which Britain entered after the German invasion of Poland, Gardner's expertise became all the more important. She died as a result of a German land mine which landed on her house. One of her manuscripts was recovered from the bomb site, but another was lost. Gardner's funeral was an important event that was attended by the President of Poland, Władysław Raczkiewicz.

== Works ==
- Adam Mickiewicz: The National Poet of Poland (1911)
- Poland A Study in National Idealism (1915)
- Poland (1917; 2nd ed. 1926; 3rd ed. 1942) - "Peeps at Many Lands" series, with illustrations after Artur Grottger
- The Anonymous Poet of Poland: Zygmunt Krasiński (1919)
- Kościuszko: A Biography (1920; 2nd ed. 1942)
- The Patriot Novelist of Poland: Henryk Sienkiewicz (1926)
- Tales from Henryk Sienkiewicz (editor, 1931) - "Everyman's Library" series, no. 871
- Queen Jadwiga of Poland (1934)
- The Spirit of Poland (1940)
