= Edmund Naganowski =

- Born: Edmund Wacław Naganowski; 26 September 1853; Gostyń, Kingdom of Prussia
- Died: 28 January 1915 (aged 61); Lviv, Austria-Hungary
- Other names: E. Działosz, Latarnik, Edmund Sas
- Education: University of Dublin

Edmund Wacław Naganowski (26 September 1853 – 28 January 1915), was a Polish publicist and writer also known under pen names E. Działosz, Latarnik and Edmund Sas (Sas most likely refers to his Sas coat of arms).

== Life ==
Naganowski was born in Gostyń, Greater Poland, then in Grand Duchy of Posen, that after 1815 was part of the Kingdom of Prussia. After finishing his studies in England, he was a teacher in a high school in Waterford in Ireland and he later worked at the British Museum. On 14 February 1903 he became naturalized in Great Britain, under the name Edmund Sas de Naganowski.

He served as secretary of the Literary Association of the Friends of Poland in London

He is credited with the introduction of scouting in Poland.

Monica Mary Gardner acknowledged the influence and support of Naganowski on her interests in Polish culture from 1899 to the outbreak of the First World War.
