= Ivashkivtsi, Lviv Oblast =

Ivashkivtsi Івашківці
- Village
- Location in Lviv Oblast Location in Ukraine
- Coordinates: 48°52′06″N 23°06′47″E
- Country: Ukraine
- Oblast: Lviv
- Raion: Sambir
- Area: 0.4 km^{2} (0.15 sq mi)
- Population: 52
  - Density: 130/km^{2} (340/sq mi)

Ivashkivtsi (Ukrainian: Івашківці, Polish: Iwaszkowice) is a village (selo) in Sambir Raion, Lviv Oblast, in south-west Ukraine. It belongs to Borynia, one of the hromadas of Ukraine.

There is a Saint Michael Orthodox church in the village, built in 1921.

Until 18 July 2020, Ivashkivtsi belonged to Turka Raion. The raion was abolished in July 2020 as part of the administrative reform of Ukraine, which reduced the number of raions of Lviv Oblast to seven. The area of Turka Raion was merged into Sambir Raion.
