= Rudolf Regner =

Polish soldier

- Born: 1917; Dolina, Kingdom of Galicia and Lodomeria, Austria-Hungary
- Died: 1941 (aged 23–24); UkrSSR, Soviet Union
- Military career
- Allegiance: Polish Underground State
- Branch: Grey Ranks
- Service years: 1939-1941
- Nickname: Rudek
- Unit: Biali Kurierzy
- Conflicts: WWII

Rudolf "Rudek" Regner (1917 in Dolina – probably in June 1941), was a Polish scout, soldier and member of the White Couriers. Before World War II, he worked as a bookkeeper in a cooperative located in southeastern Polish town of Turka (now in Ukraine).

Between late 1939 and mid-1940, Regner, together with a group of Polish scouts mostly from Lwow, led scores of people across Soviet-Hungarian border (see: Molotov–Ribbentrop Pact) in the Eastern Carpathians. He would lead to Budapest those Poles who wanted to escape Soviet occupation. From Hungary, he would bring newspapers and directives of General Wladyslaw Sikorski. Regner, who was born and raised in the borderland area (before the war, there had been the Polish–Czechoslovak border), used his knowledge and skills.

The circumstances of his death are unknown. According to some sources, he was captured by the NKVD in May 1940, while leading a group of escapees. However, it is more likely that he was arrested in Komarniki on 8 July 1940 and incarcerated in Drohobycz military prison. On 16 May 1941 he was sentenced to death by the court of the Kiev Military District. He was shot in Lwow prison in early June 1941, just days before Operation Barbarossa (see: NKVD prisoner massacres).

== See also ==
- Political repression in the Soviet Union
- Wladyslaw Ossowski
