= Biali Kurierzy =

Unit of the WWII Polish Underground

White Couriers
- Biali Kurierzy
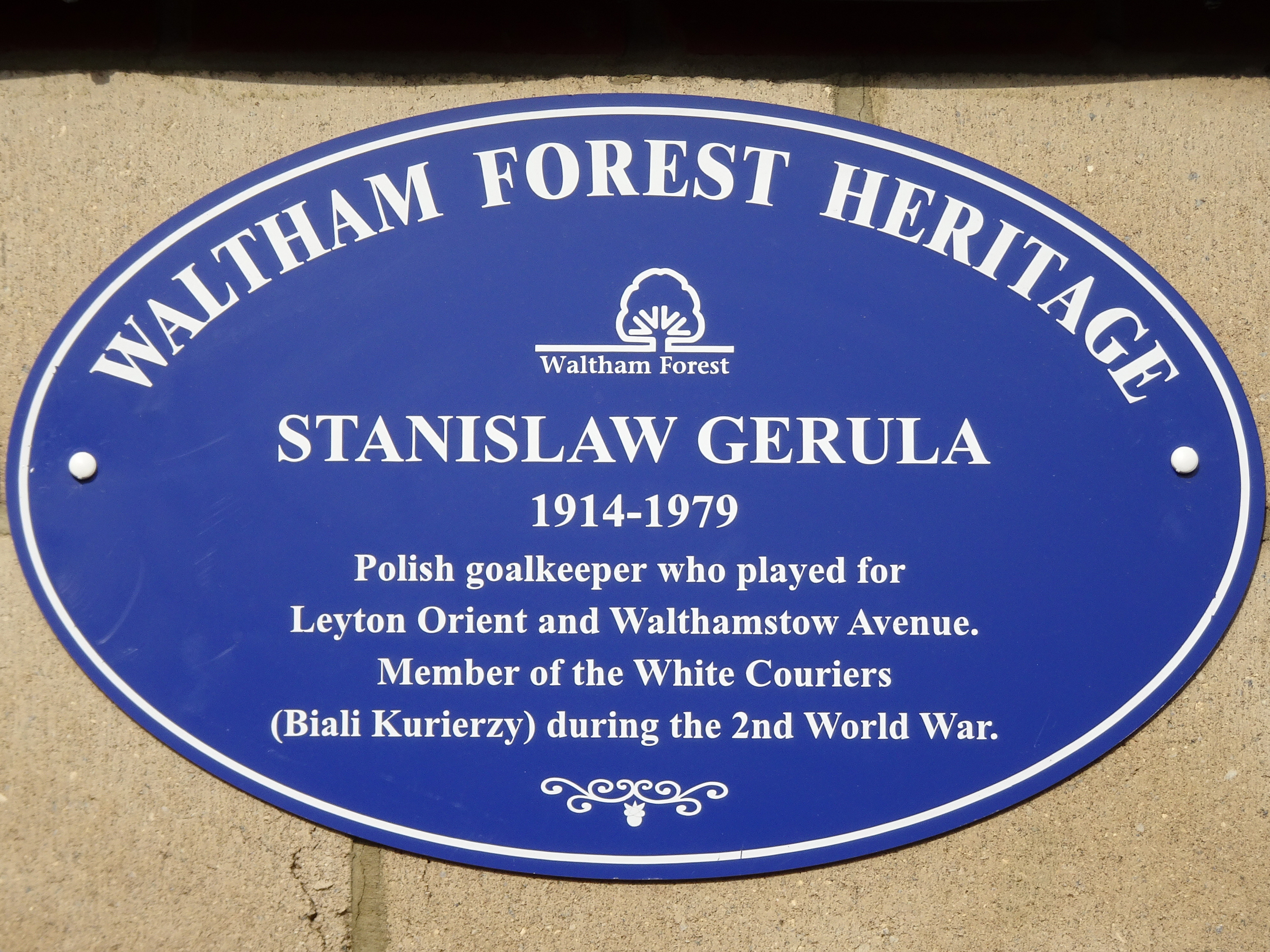
- A plaque dedicated to the White Courier Stanisław Gerula, in Waltham Forest
- Active: October 1939
- Disbanded: July 1940
- Countries: UkrSSR; General Government (District of Galicia)
- Allegiance: Polish Underground State
- Branch: Grey Ranks
- Role: Evacuation of Poles from the occupied kresy
- Size: 30
- Engagements: WWII

White Couriers (Polish: Biali Kurierzy) was a group of around 20-30 Polish boy scouts and former soldiers of the Polish Army, most of whom had been associated with the interbellum sports club Junak Drohobycz. It existed between October 1939 and July 1940, when it was broken up by the Soviet NKVD. The task of the White Couriers was to smuggle people from the Soviet-occupied southeastern part of the former Second Polish Republic, to the Hungarian region of Carpathian Ruthenia and further to Budapest. The White Couriers were part of the Grey Ranks, a wartime codename for the underground Polish Scouting Association.

Following the Molotov–Ribbentrop Pact, eastern Poland, known as the Kresy, was annexed by the Soviet Union. The Soviets immediately began a campaign of large-scale mass terror, with hundreds of thousands of people deported to Siberia. The terror was mostly aimed at Polish professionals and their entire families.

== Activities ==
The creation of the White Couriers was a direct response to the Soviet terror, as hundreds of people, mostly from the city of Lwow, decided to escape the Soviet Union across the Soviet-Hungarian border in the Eastern Carpathians, which had been established as a result of the Polish September Campaign. The Couriers were mostly young men in their 20s or even teens, members of the prewar Polish Scouting Association and athletes of the Junak Drohobycz sports club. They knew the landscape very well and within 10 months they managed to smuggle an unknown number of persons. On their way back from Hungary, they took money, Polish-language newspapers published in the West as well as orders of the Government in exile.

The group was subject to the Ewa department (an abbreviation of the word evacuation) of the Polish Embassy in Budapest and, among others, was supported by Major Mieczyslaw Mlotek. The name came from a humorous dialogue of Szczepko and Tońko, popular Polish Radio Lwow characters of the Wesola lwowska fala broadcast.

The couriers worked alone or in pairs. All had to be physically and emotionally strong, it was crucial for them to know the borderland area, guarded by the NKVD border guard. Altogether, there were up to 30 of them. Only four survived World War II, with the majority captured and executed by the Soviet occupiers. One of the survivors, Tadeusz Chciuk-Celt, also known as Marek Celt, wrote a book White Couriers (Biali Kurierzy), in which he described their fate.

== Known members of the White Couriers ==
Note: the list is incomplete:

- Tadeusz Chciuk-Celt (nom de guerre Zawadkowski)
- Szczepan Michalski, murdered in Soviet prison in June 1941
- Ferdynand Freimuth
- Rudolf Regner, murdered in Soviet prison in June 1941
- Tadeusz Żelechowski, (nom de guerre Lopek)
- Władysław Ossowski
- Zbigniew Janicki
- Zbigniew Twardy
- Jan Hammerling
- Jan Antoni Krasulski (nom de guerre Naganowski), a Batiar from Lwow, killed by the NKVD border troops in 1940
- Stanisław Gerula, goalkeeper of Junak Drohobycz, and later Leyton Orient and Walthamstow Avenue
- Bronisław Lisowski
- Helena Świątek, née Kamińska

== See also ==
- Home Army
- Political repression in the Soviet Union
- Rudolf Regner
- Wladyslaw Ossowski
- Polish contribution to World War II
