= Polish Scouting and Guiding Association =

Polish Scouting organization

The Polish Scouting and Guiding Association
- Polish: Związek Harcerstwa Polskiego
- Headquarters: ZHP Headquarters Warsaw, Konopnickiej 6
- Country: Poland
- Founded: 1 November 1918; 10 December 1956 (reestablished)
- Founders: Andrzej Małkowski, Olga Małkowska
- Membership: 142 692 as of 2023
- Naczelnik: Martyna Kowacka
- Affiliation: World Organization of the Scout Movement, World Association of Girl Guides and Girl Scouts
- Website www.zhp.pl

Scout	Girl Scout

The Polish Scouting and Guiding Association (Polish: Związek Harcerstwa Polskiego, ZHP) is the coeducational Polish Scouting organization recognized by the World Organization of the Scout Movement and the World Association of Girl Guides and Girl Scouts. It was founded in 1918 and currently is the largest Scouting organization in Poland (142,692 members in 2023). The first ZHP was founded in 1916, the current one is the fourth organization with this name. It is a public benefit organization as defined by Polish law.

== History ==
=== Pre-war history ===
The Polish Scout movement was started in 1910. Initially, the ideas of Scouting were implemented by Andrzej Małkowski and his wife Olga. The three main branches of Polish Scouting included the Strzelec paramilitary organization for boys, a sport and education society Sokół and the anti-alcoholic association Eleusis. However, it wasn't until the Partitions of Poland came to an end that the ZHP would be officially founded by the merging of existing groups.

Soon after the merger in 1918, the ZHP members fought in all the conflicts Poland was engaged in around this time: Great Poland Uprising, Polish-Bolshevik War, Silesian Uprisings, and Polish-Ukrainian War, much like their predecessors during the Siege of Mafeking.

All of the units joined in 1918 and formed the ZHP, one of the founding members of the World Organization of the Scout Movement. Although many units retained their own traditions, a common law, common symbols, and a common oath were introduced. The primary difference between most Scouting organizations and the Polish Harcerstwo was described by Andrzej Małkowski:

Harcerstwo is Scouting plus independence.

Before 1939 the ZHP was one of the largest social and educational associations in Poland with over 200,000 members. Among the "sponsors" of Polish Harcerstwo were all the presidents of Poland and several high-ranking officers of the Polish Land Forces, including general Józef Haller.

=== Grey Ranks ===
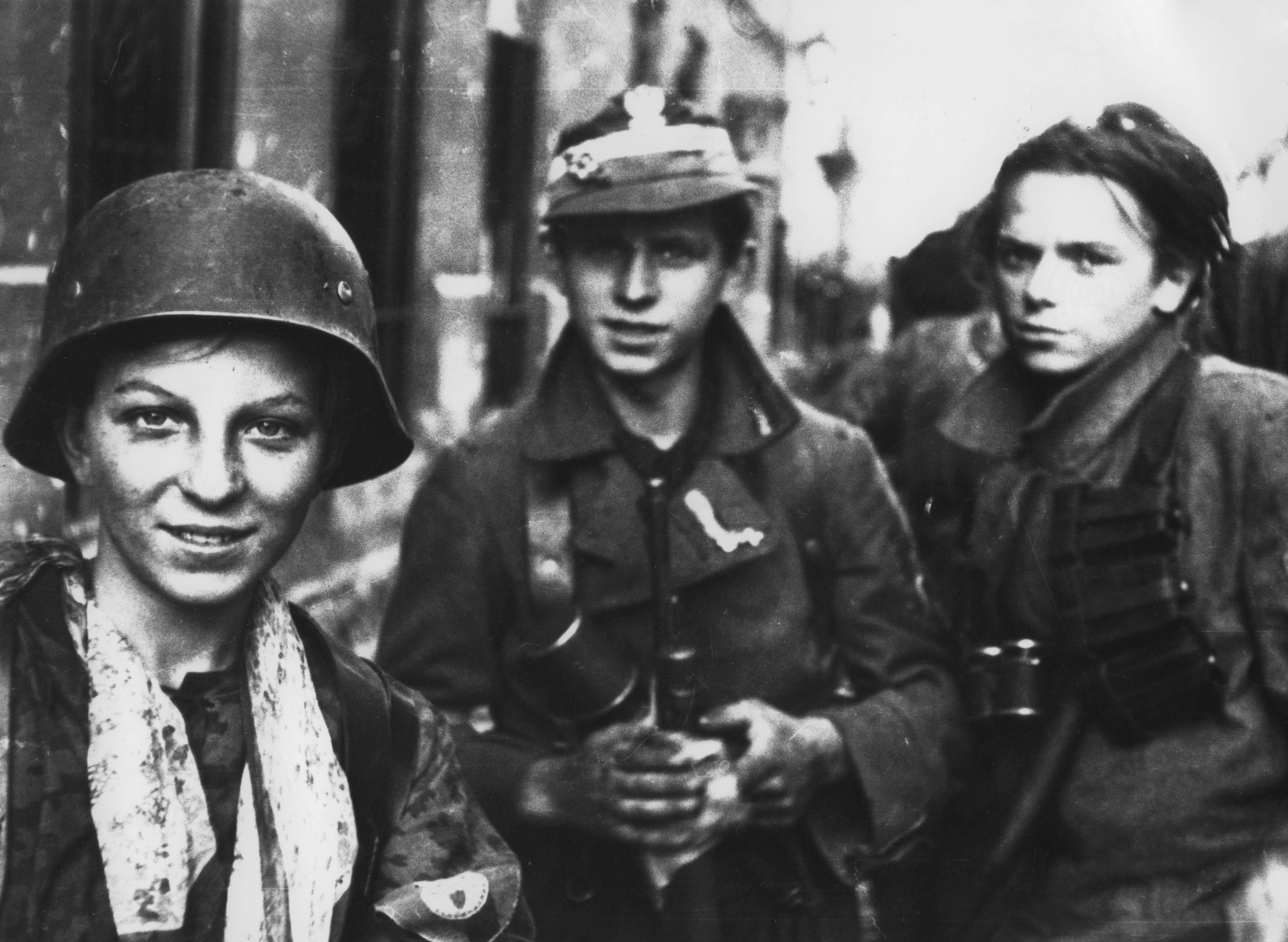
Polish Boy Scouts fighting in the Warsaw Uprising

After the invasion of Poland of 1939, the ZHP, many of whom joined defense militias, were branded partisans and criminals by Nazi Germany, who had executed many scouts and guides, along with other possible resistance leaders (for example during the Katowice massacre). Nonetheless, the ZHP carried on as a clandestine organization. In 1940, the Soviet Union executed most of the Boy Scouts held at Ostashkov prison.

The wartime scouts evolved into the paramilitary Szare Szeregi (Grey Ranks), cooperating with the Polish underground state and the Armia Krajowa resistance. Older scouts carried out sabotage, armed resistance, and assassinations. The Girl Guides formed auxiliary units working as nurses, liaisons, and munition carriers. At the same time, the youngest scouts were involved in so-called small sabotage under the auspice of the Wawer organization, which included dropping leaflets or painting the kotwica sign on the walls. During Operation Tempest, and especially during the Warsaw Uprising, the scouts participated in the fighting, and several Szare Szeregi units were some of the most effective in combat.

In December 1944 the Polish Committee of National Liberation (PKWN) reformed the scouting movement under the name of the pre-WWII scouting organization, though with authorities loyal to the new government and an ethos in line with that of the Soviet Pioneer Movement, pressuring the organization to become a member thereof, eventually altogether disbanding in even in that form in 1949. The organization was integrated into the Polish United Workers' Party (PZPR), with most of its members now part of a new Soviet-style, government-sponsored pioneer organization – the Scouts of the Working Youth of Poland (Scouting Organisation of the Association of Polish Youth – Organizacja Harcerska Związku Młodzieży Polskiej or ZMP-OH), which retained the original Polish scouting movement's motto while adopting pioneer traditions of Eastern Bloc countries, save for the uniform and the pioneer salute used in the Soviet Union and other pioneer associations of the Eastern Bloc (the scouts retained the two-finger salute in honor of the young boys and girls who fought in the Second World War with both the Polish People's Army and the Home Army). The only existing part of pre-war ZHP is the ZHP pgK, established to serve Polish scouts outside their homeland.

=== Modern history ===
Emblem of the Organizacja Harcerska Związku Młodzieży Polskiej 1950–1956

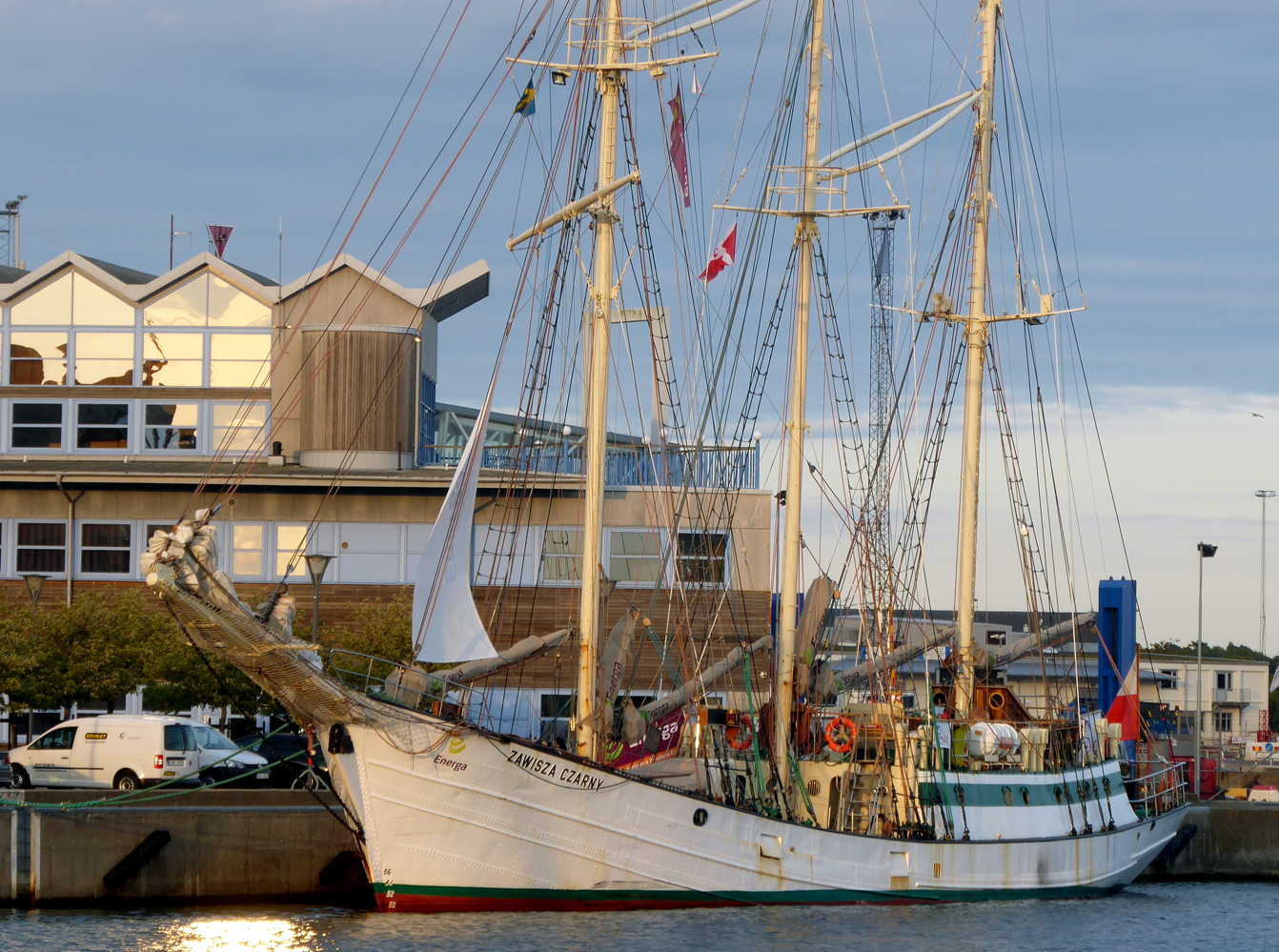
Zawisza Czarny owned by the Polish Scouting and Guiding Association, ZHP.

In 1956, after Stalin's and Bolesław Bierut's death, the Polish United Workers' Party youth movement ZMP OH was transformed and renamed to ZHP. However the new ZHP did not consider itself as a continuation of the pre-war ZHP, but as a new organization (until 1980). After 1958 many pre-war instructors were removed from the new ZHP or marginalized (like Aleksander Kamiński) and the original oath, law, educational content and methods were changed (mention of God was removed from the oath, Lenin introduced as a hero, the Bolshevik Revolution was commemorated, the brigades became co-educational similar to Eastern Bloc Pioneer associations). The two-finger salute common to the Polish Scouts was retained, and a new uniform debuted.

Despite this, the Polish Scouting and Guiding Association became one of the very few official organizations that retained some independence from the ruling PZPR party. Because of this, its growth was rapid, and in 1980 it had more than three million active members. The Polish Scouts were engaged in a variety of duties, varying from helping in the fields of the poorest regions to organizing the visits of Pope John Paul II. After the martial law was imposed in 1981 the ZHP was the only large social organization not to be banned. The "VIII ZHP Convention" even supported the martial law. However, many of its high-ranking officials were interned because of their involvement in the Solidarność movement, as well as several Scoutmasters. The ZHP would later be admitted in the 1980s as part of the Patriotic Movement for National Rebirth.

In 1989, after the period of peaceful transformation began, many groups of instructors formed separate Scouting organizations (like the ZHR, Stowarzyszenie Harcerstwa Katolickiego Zawisza or ZHP-1918). These moves were prompted by political disagreements with the character of ZHP; they felt that its communist takeover left a permanent mark upon the organisation, and that the only way to effectively reform the movement was to found a new organisation. ZHR's founding will serve as an adequate example of this principle. After pope John Paul II's first pilgrimage to Poland in August 1980, some "non-conforming" instructors inside the ZHP created the Andrzej Małkowski Circle of Scout Instructors (KIHAM), with the objective to restore original Scout ideals. These instructors presented reformative motions to the 7th Congress of ZHP at the beginning of 1981, but these were all rejected. When martial law was imposed in December 1981, a large number of organisations were outlawed, so ZHR was forced to conduct their activities – weekly meetings, yearly camps and so on – underground. The underground movement came to light in the fall of 1988. After they were unsuccessful in reforming the ZHP their way, the ZHR was founded.

In this reformative climate, ZHP did adopt some of Polish Scouting's pre-war traditions: e.g. the original oath and Scouts Law were reintroduced, and of course the overt communist aspects, such as the glorification of Lenin, were removed. However, the organisation remains co-educational. In 1993 Lech Wałęsa became the honorary protector of the ZHP, just like all former Polish presidents. In 1996 the ZHP rejoined the World Organization of the Scout Movement. The Scout Association is also a member of the World Association of Girl Guides and Girl Scouts (since 1996), International Scout and Guide Fellowship, International Catholic Conference of Scouting, International Catholic Conference of Guiding. These memberships have allowed ZHP to claim the greatest legitimacy, successfully dominating the other organisations of Polish Scouting, such as ZHR and ZHP pgK, the organisation which brings together Polish Scouts in the international Emigree community, with members in Australia, Argentina, Belarus, Canada, France, Great Britain, Kazakhstan, Lithuania, Sweden, the United States, Ukraine, among other countries with Polish residents in the diaspora and as such the organization is affiliated to the International Link of Orthodox Christian Scouts. ZHP PGK, also known as ZHP Świat, has adopted policies similar to those of the Boy Scouts of America, where agnostics and atheists are not allowed to be instructors.

== Structure and age groups ==
=== Age groups ===
There are four age groups, although the age limits are not strictly adhered to:

- zuchy (Cub Scouts and Brownies) – 6–10 years
- harcerze and harcerki (Scouts and Guides) – 10–13 years
- harcerze starsi and harcerki starsze (Venture Scouts and Venture Guides) – 13–16 years
- wędrownicy and wędrowniczki (Rovers and Rangers) – 16–21 years

=== Structure ===
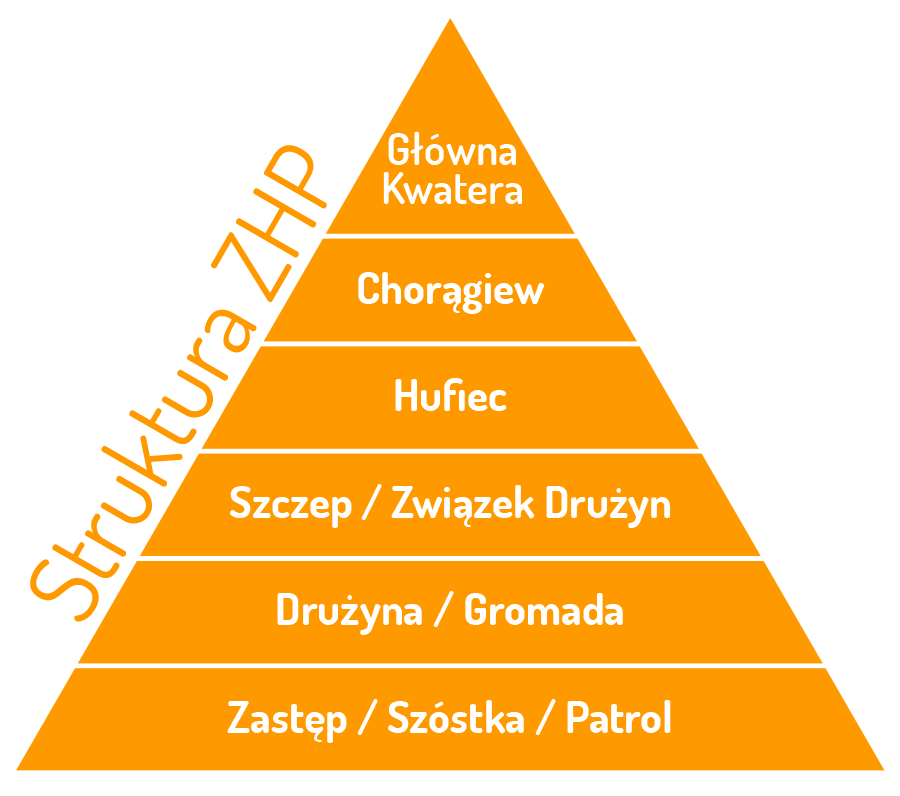
Structure of ZHP

The basic unit of ZHP is a drużyna (troop), consisting of approximately 30 boys or girls. Each drużyna is formed by several units named zastęp (patrol) consisting of about seven people. A few troops (especially working at the same school or housing estate) can be connected in one szczep (group). Several groups or/and troops from a specified area (borough, village, town) form a hufiec (district) which in turn is a part of one of the regions called chorągiew (literally banner). For example, a particular Scout can be a member of

- zastęp starszoharcerski Pantery (patrol of senior Scouts The Panthers)
- 156 Warszawska Drużyna Harcerzy Dżungla (156th Warsaw Troop of Boy Scouts Jungle)
- Szczep 156 Warszawskich Drużyn Harcerskich i Zuchowych (Group of 156th Warsaw Troops of Boy Scouts and Girl Guides and Cub Scouts)
- Hufiec ZHP Warszawa-Mokotów (Warsaw-Mokotów District)
- Chorągiew Stołeczna ZHP (Warsaw (Capital) Region of ZHP)

== See also ==
- Scouting and Guiding in Poland
