= Andrzej Małkowski =

Polish Scoutmaster activist

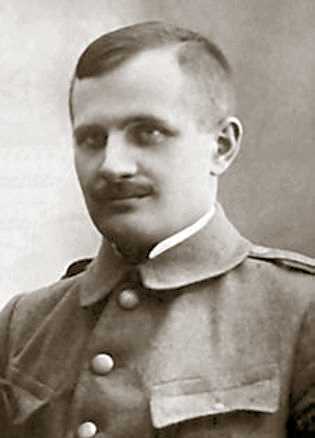
Andrzej Małkowski 1913

Andrzej Juliusz Małkowski (31 October 1888, Trębki - 15 January 1919, Strait of Messina) was a Polish Scoutmaster (harcmistrz) activist of youth and independence organisations. He and his wife, Olga, are widely regarded as the founders of Scouting in Poland. To honor his name, his troop wrote a song about him called Na Polanie.

Małkowski decided to join the Polish Legions, along with many of the boys in his Scout troop. Before he left, he organised a cottage for his wife and the boys and girls who had no homes, and she opened a café to earn her living. After he left, there was one Boy Scout troop and one large Girl Guide Company of 300 girls. They paraded each morning in the central square and gave reports to and took orders from his wife. They took on a huge number of tasks including supplementing the postal service, organising a children's home, helping with the harvest, and setting up a hospital.

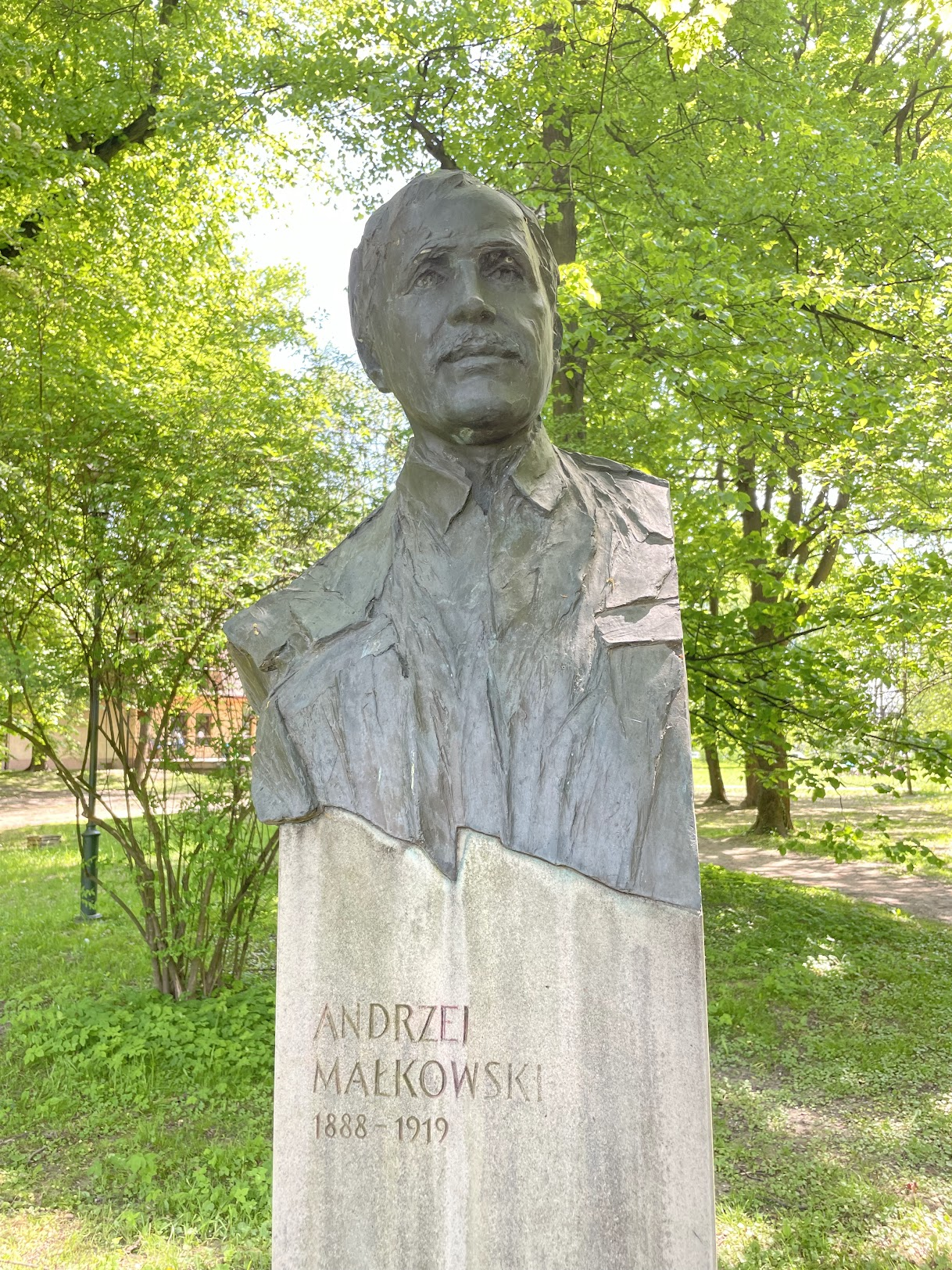
Bust of Andrzej Małkowski sculpted by Maciej Zychowicz found in Henryk Jordan Park, Kraków, Poland

In 1915 they were forced to leave Zakopane by the Austrian government, and they moved through Switzerland to the United States. Their son, Lutyk, was born in the United States on 30 October 1915. Afterwards they returned to Switzerland in 1916, where she worked as a teacher and custodian of the Polish museum. In 1919 Andrzej Małkowski died at the age of 30 on a mission given him by Polish Army. His widow never remarried.

In 2018, at a ceremony held at the Royal Castle in Warsaw on the 100th anniversary of Poland regaining its independence, Polish President Andrzej Duda posthumously conferred the country's highest distinction, the Order of the White Eagle, upon 25 distinguished Poles including Małkowski.
