= Olga Drahonowska-Małkowska =

Polish scout

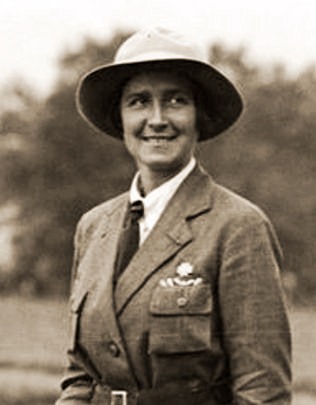
- Olga Drahonowska-Małkowska in 1932
- Born: January 9, 1888; Krzeszowice, Poland
- Died: January 15, 1979 (aged 91); Zakopane, Poland
- Spouse: Andrzej Małkowski

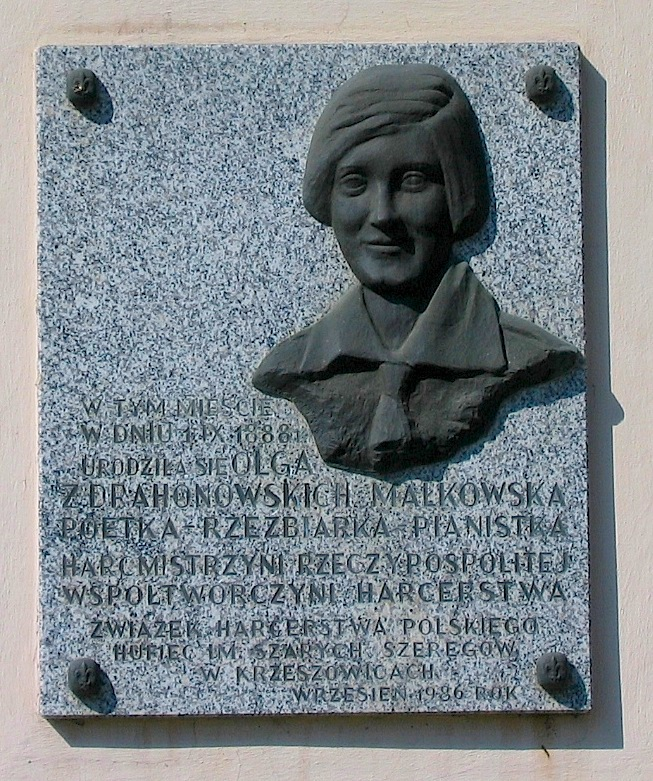
Krzeszowice, memorial plaque to Olga Małkowska

Olga Drahonowska-Małkowska (January 9, 1888, Krzeszowice, Poland – January 15, 1979, Zakopane, Poland), with her husband, founded scouting in Poland.

== Childhood and adolescence ==
Olga Drahonowska-Małkowska was born in Krzeszowice, the second daughter of Zofia and Karol Drahonowski. Her father, Karol, whose background was Armenian, was a trustee of a farm for a Polish baron. Although she has Czech origins, she always emphasized her Polish nationality. She finished her primary and secondary school extramural (at home) with very good grades. After baccalaureate she started studies in the Music Conservatory of Lwów, when she discovered talents in poetry and sculpture. She was also an instructor of physical education in Sokół, and a member of the Eleusis organization, where she met Andrzej Małkowski. He convinced her to join Zarzewie, a Polish independence organization, where she became a Lieutenant.

== 3rd Lwów Girl Scout Company ==
Olga Drahonowska was introduced to Scouting by her friend, and later husband, Andrzej Juliusz Małkowski. She became Scoutmaster (harcmistrzyni) of the 3rd Lwów Girl Scout Company (the 1st, 2nd and 4th Companies were Boy Scouts). This consisted of about twenty girls aged between 15 and 20 years. She was also first chief of Girl Guides in Poland (1911–1912). She and Ignacy Kozielewski were co-authors of the lyrics to the Polish Scout anthem "Wszystko co nasze". In 1913 she moved to Zakopane to benefit her health. There she married Andrzej Małkowski. The priest who tied the knot was Kazimierz Lutosławski.

== World War I ==
In the summer of 1914, just before the start of World War I, her health having recovered, Drahonowska-Małkowska organised the first national Scout camp. Girls (by now renamed Guides) who originated from the Russian and German-controlled areas of Poland came to the camp under assumed names and false passports. One girl turned out to be a spy and was caught looking through Drahonowska-Małkowska's tent for a list of these Guides names.

One morning a detachment of the Secret Military Police (some of whom were brothers to the Guides) came to announce that war had been declared. Andrzej Małkowski wrote to say the camp should close at once and that, as the borders had closed, he had found accommodation in Zakopane for those girls who could not get home. The Małkowski's were asked by the Mayor of Zakopane to organise the night watch for the town because there was insufficient police and older people were too scared.

Andrzej Małkowski decided to join the Polish Legions, along with many of the boys in his Scout troop. Before he left, he organised a cottage for his wife and the boys and girls who had no homes, and she opened a café to earn her living. After Małkowski left, there was one Boy Scout troop and one large Girl Guide Company of 300 girls. They paraded each morning in the central square and gave reports to and took orders from Drahonowska-Małkowska. They took on a huge number of tasks including supplementing the postal service, organising a children's home, helping with the harvest, and setting up a hospital. In 1915 they were forced to leave Zakopane by the Austrian government, and they moved through Switzerland to the United States. Their son Lutyk, was born in the USA on 30 October 1915, and after that returned to Switzerland in 1916, where she worked as a teacher and custodian of the Polish museum. In 1919 Andrzej Małkowski died on a mission given him by Polish Army. She never remarried.

== Between wars ==
In 1921 Małkowska decided to come back to Poland, where she started working as a teacher in Zakopane, and started scoutmaster courses in Kuźnice. In 1924 she was chief of Girl Guides meeting in Świder (near Warsaw), and chief of the Polish contingent for Girl Guides Scoutmasters Meeting in Foxlease, England. In 1925 she set up the School of Scout Work in Sromowce Wyżne which was an orphanage and boarding school for Polish children. Her school was considered a very modern centre of new education and promoter Scouting principles. She was also given the rank of Harcmistrz Rzeczypospolitej.

In 1932 she was leading VII World Girl Guides Conference in Bucz, where she was elected to the Girl Guides World Committee. She was also elected Scout delegate to the Committee of Child and Adolescent in the League of Nations. The Polish government awarded her the Officer's Cross of the Order of Polonia Restituta and the Cross of Independence.

== World War II ==
At the start of World War II, Drahonowska-Małkowska was running a school using Scouting principles. When war broke out she took the children by train to a neutral country. The train was frequently under fire from machine guns mounted on aeroplanes. Drahonowska-Małkowska claimed that the children's Scouting training saved their lives, as when the train was attacked, the children were disciplined enough to obey her order to scatter, which made them far less easy targets for snipers than other passengers who formed huddles. She decided to move to the U.K. When she reached the UK, the Girl Guides Association (now Girlguiding UK) awarded her their Bronze Cross for Gallantry. She set up a Polish orphanage, and worked in the Polish Scout organization. She was also organising food transport for children in Warsaw.

== After WWII ==
Between 1948-60 Małkowska was leading the Polish Children's Home in Hawson Court in Buckfastleigh, Devon. She moved to Poland in 1961, first living in Wrocław ul. Nowa 8 in the former house of Corps Borussia Breslau and then in Zakopane. She was given the Honour Medal of Friend of Children. She died in 1979 aged 91, on the 60th anniversary of her husband's death, and she was buried with him in Zakopane. Over their grave there is a granite monument of the founders of Polish Scouting.
