= Jan Rodowicz =

Polish resistance fighter (1923–1949)

Jan Rodowicz "Anoda"
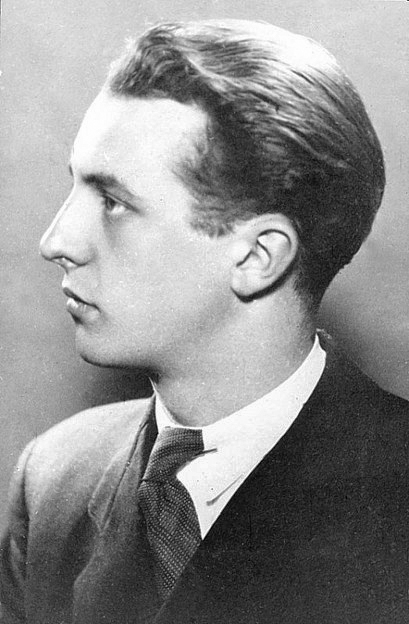
- Born: 7 March 1923; Warsaw, Poland
- Died: 7 January 1949 (aged 25); Warsaw, Poland

Jan Rodowicz (7 March 1923 – 7 January 1949), alias "Anoda", was a Polish scout, soldier of the Grey Ranks, the Home Army and of the Armed Forces' Delegation, lieutenant.

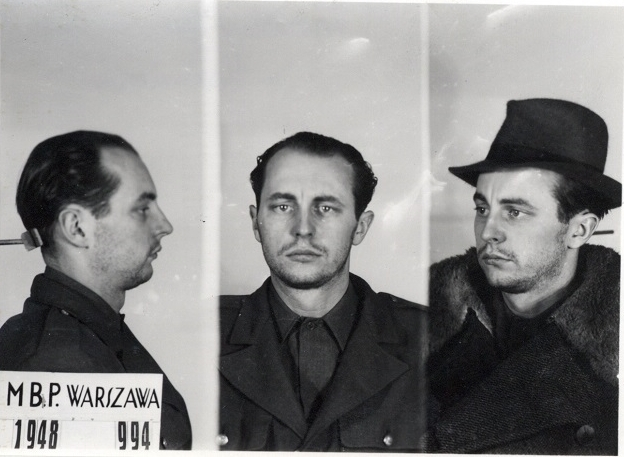
Jan Rodowicz after arrest by MBP

== Biography ==
=== Youth ===
Rodowicz was a son of Kazimierz Rodowicz, an engineer and professor at the Warsaw University of Technology, and Zofia Bortnowska, sister of General Władysław Bortnowski. He attended the Private School of the Society of the Mazovian Land, where he became a member of the 21st Warsaw Scouting Team named after General Ignacy Prądzyński. In the years 1935-1939, Rodowicz attended the Stefan Batory State Gymnasium and Lyceum, where he passed his so-called small matura exam in the spring of 1939. During that time Rodowicz continued his scouting activity in the ranks of the 23rd Warsaw Scouting Team "Bolesław Chrobry" - famous "Orangery", where he met many legendary members of the Grey Ranks, including Tadeusz Zawadzki, Aleksy Dawidowski and Jan Bytnar. Rodowicz obtained the rank of petty scoutmaster.

=== German occupation ===
After the defeat of the Polish army during the September campaign, Rodowicz became involved in underground activity and became a member of the Grey Ranks in October 1939. He participated in many small sabotage operations within the Wawer organization. At the same time, attended secret classes of the Batory Junior High School. He passed his matura exam in 1941. Rodowicz then took up a job in the electrical workshop of engineer Tadeusz Czarnecki, and then in the Radio Workshop of Philips. In 1941, after completing a course in mechanical and electrical engineering, he began his studies at the Secondary School of Electrical Engineering, which he graduated from in 1943, Rodowicz continuously maintained his underground activity. From July to December 1942, he took part in the second turn of the Substitute Course of the Officers' School of Infantry Reserves ZWZ-AK "Agricola", after which he obtained the rank of platoon officer cadet. Rodowicz had also completed courses in combat training and a great diversion. In November 1942 he became the deputy commander of the 2nd team of Feliks Pendelski alias "Felek" at the Centre Troup of Grey Ranks Assault Groups. Rodowicz took an active part in many combat operations:

- 26 March 1943 - Operation "Mexico II" (Operation Arsenal) - liberation from the hands of the Gestapo of Jan Bytnar "Rudy" and all the prisoners transported with him from the Gestapo headquarters at J. Ch. Szucha Avenue 25 to the Pawiak prison; "Anoda" had commanded the "Bottles" section, and during his retreat rescued Aleksy Dawidowski, who was attacked by a German civilian. Rodowicz received the Cross of Valour in May 1943 for taking part in this operation.
- During the night of 20–21 May 1943, an operation code-named "Celestynów" - taking over a carriage carrying 49 prisoners from the concentration camp at Majdanek to the concentration camp at Auschwitz;
- 27 May 1943, codename "Salt" - seizure of warehouses at a chemical factory in the Prague District in order to obtain potassium chlorate needed for the production of explosives; "Anoda" commanded the backup section;
- 20 August 1943, operation "Tape” - "Anoda" was a member of the "Attack I" group, which attacked a Grenzschutz post in Sieczychy.

Between June and July 1943, Jan Rodowicz participated in preparations for the operation of liberating prisoners in Jaktorow. In September of the same year, after the reorganization of the Assault Groups and establishment of the "Zośka" Battalion, Rodowicz took the position of deputy commander of the 3rd platoon of Konrad Okolski "Kuba", 1st company "Felek", commanded by Sławomir Bittner "Maciek". In November, Rodowicz was promoted to the rank of sergeant officer cadet and became acting the commander of platoon "Ryszard" of the 2nd company "Rudy". He participated in every combat mission with his platoon:

- 10 September 1943 – preparations of the action for the release of prisoners in Milanówek,
- during the night from 23 to 24 September 1943 - derailment and shooting of the military holiday train near Pogorzela on the Warsaw - Dęblin railway line,
- 26 September 1943, an attack on a German police station, a navy blue police station, and a "streifa" station on the Powsin road, as well as airmen's barracks (Operation Wilanów),
- during the night from 5 to 6 June 1944, a railway culvert was blown up in Rogóżne near Przeworsk on the Rzeszów - Przeworsk railway line,
- during the night from 22 to 23 June 1944, shooting and grenading German cars on the Warsaw - Góra Kalwaria road.

From May to July 1944, Rodowicz stayed with his platoon in the forests of the White Wilderness in the region of Wyszków, conducting intensive military training. He returned to Warsaw at the end of July.

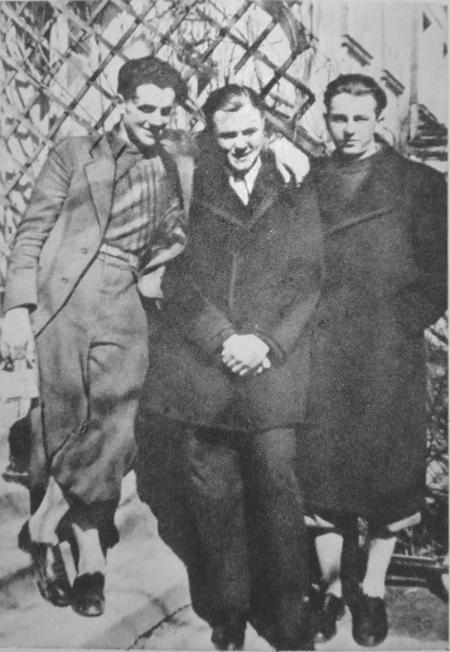
Jan Rodowicz (on the right) with his colleagues - Sławomir Szymankiewicz "Czarnota" (left) and Józef Saski "Katoda" (middle)

=== Participation in the Warsaw Uprising ===
During the uprising Rodowicz initially fought in the Wola District as a deputy commander of the 3rd platoon "Felek" of the 2nd company "Rudy" of the "Zośka" Battalion, which was a part of the group of Kedyw KG AK commanded by Colonel Jan Mazurkiewicz "Radosław". On 2 August, together with the 2nd and 4th platoon teams "Felek", Rodowicz took part in the occupation of the school building at 13 Spokojna Street in the vicinity of the Powazki Cemetery. He was particularly notable for his fight for the cemeteries on 8 August, during the counteroffensive of the "Felek" platoon, led from the Evangelical Cemetery in the direction of Mlynarska and Sołtyka Streets. The platoon forced the Germans out of the cemetery and began to occupy parts of Sołtyka and Młynarska Streets, and at the same time capturing significant amounts of weapons and inflicting large losses on the enemy. On 9 August, Rodowicz was seriously injured in his left lung during an attack on the school building at 13 Spokojna Street. He was transported to the John of God Hospital at 12 Bonifraterska Street in the Old Town, and then to the battalion hospital at 23 Miodowa Street. On 11 August for his outstanding role in combat within the "North" Group, Rodowicz received the Silver Cross of the Order of Virtuti Militari V Class. He was also promoted to the rank of lieutenant. On 31 August, during the evacuation of the Old Town, Rodowicz walked through the sewers with a group of wounded soldiers of the "Zośka" Battalion to the Downtown-North District. Until 8 September, he was being treated in the hospital at 36 Hoża Street, from where he joined his unit in the Upper Czerniaków. On 15 September, during the last defense of the units of "Brody 53" Rodowicz was injured again. This time in the left arm and shoulder with a bone crack. On the next day, on his way to the hospital, he was hit yet again in his left hand with shards. On the night of 17–18 September, soldiers of the 3rd Infantry Regiment from the 1st Army of the Polish Army commanded by General Zygmunt Berling, evacuated him on a pontoon across the Vistula River to the Prague District.

=== Post-war period ===
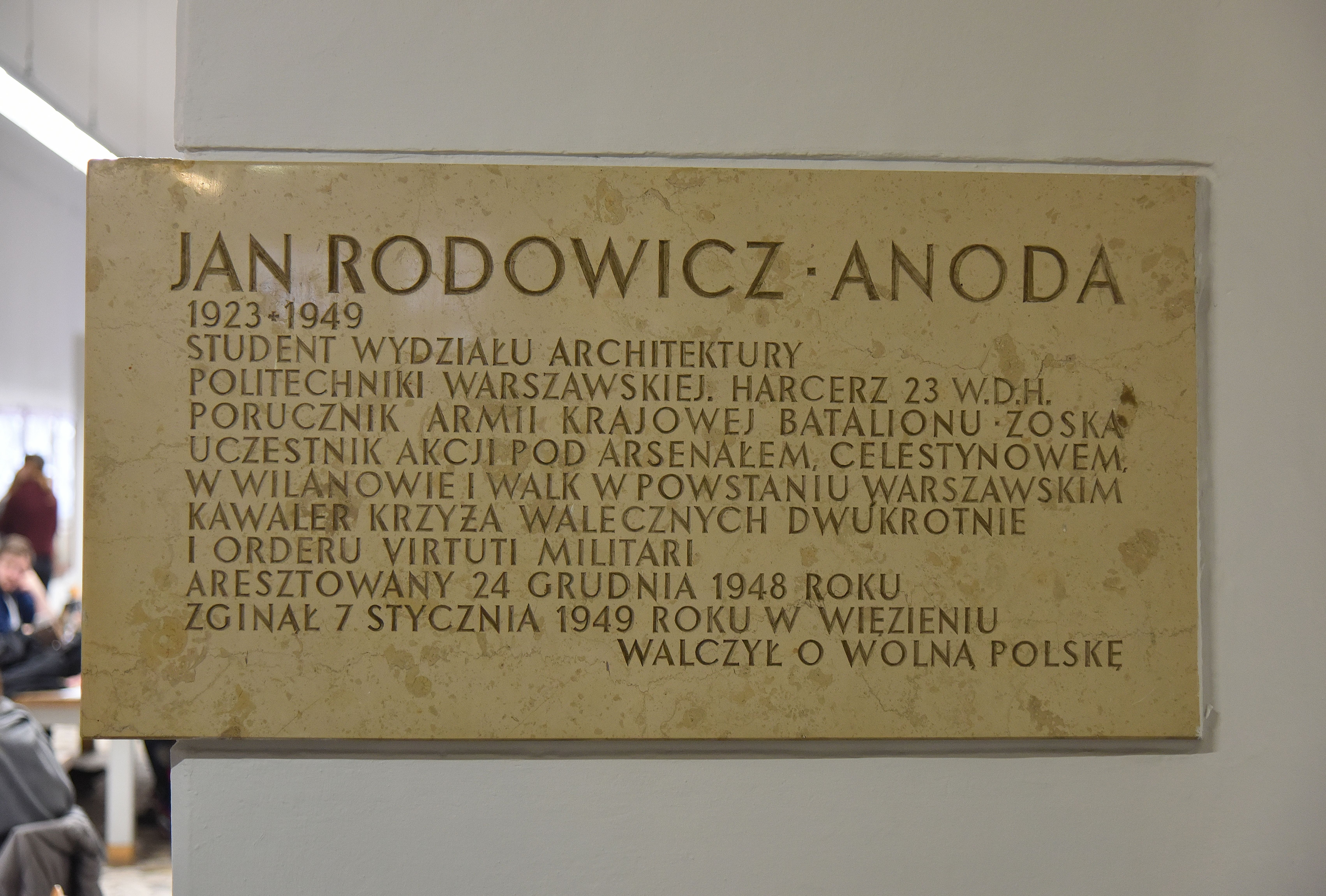
Memorial plaque on the first floor of the building of the Faculty of Architecture of the Warsaw University of Technology at 55 Koszykowa Street

After a long treatment in the Otwock hospital, Rodowicz came to his family in Milanówek at the beginning of 1945. There, he established a contact with his former colleagues from the "Zośka" Battalion, who survived the Warsaw Uprising, including Henryk Kozłowski "Kmita", former acting commander of the 1st company "Maciek". Thanks to him, Rodowicz became the commander of the dispatch unit of the Head of the Central District of the Delegation of the Armed Forces, Colonel J. Mazurkiewicz. Rodowicz led propaganda campaigns against the communist government, gathered information on public security offices, prisons and protected briefings of the DAF command.

In August 1945, after the dissolution of the DAF and his unit, Rodowicz hid some of the weapons. He then moved to Warsaw, where his family received an apartment. He took care of former soldiers of the "Zośka" Battalion, exhumations and funerals of killed comrades in the Powązki Cemetery and also created designated insurgent quarters. On September 19, as a result of the call of Col. J. Mazurkiewicz, Rodowicz revealed himself in front of the Liquidation Committee of the former Home Army Central District. He worked briefly in the office of the Liquidation Committee. Rodowicz used this time to prepare, with the help of his colleagues from the "Zośka" Battalion, lists of fallen and missing soldiers of the battalion. He also initiated the creation of the "Zośka" Battalionon Archives. He encouraged and persuaded his colleagues to look for and secure historical materials about the unit and write memoirs. In the autumn of 1945, Rodowicz began studies at the Faculty of Electrical Engineering of the Warsaw University of Technology, after which he moved to the second year of the Faculty of Architecture of the Warsaw University of Technology in 1947.

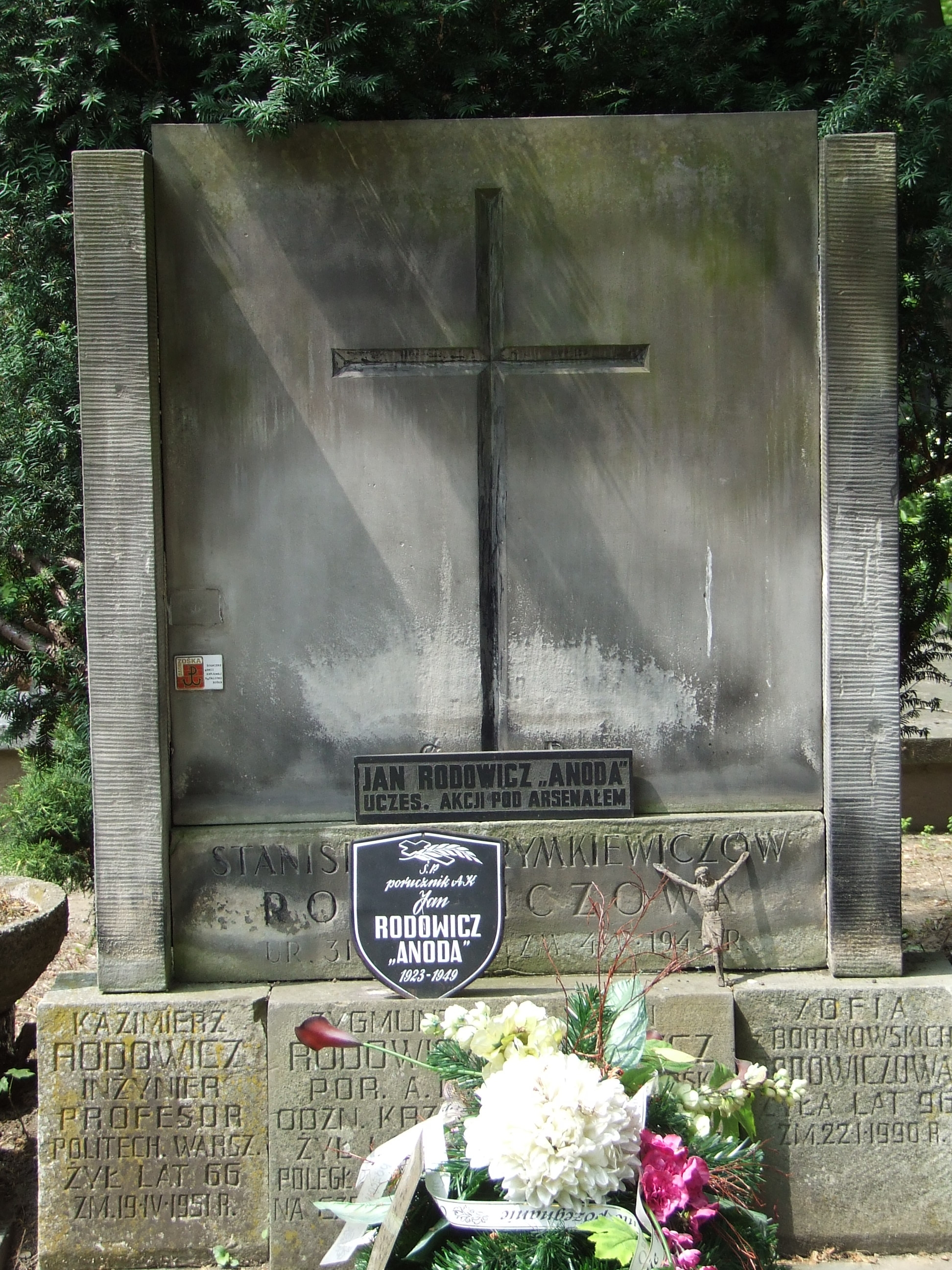
Jan Rodowicz's grave at the Powązki Cemetery, Warsaw

On 24 December 1948, Rodowicz was arrested by officers of the Ministry of Public Security, who were commanded by Lieutenant Colonel Wiktor Herer, Head of the Department IV at the Department V of the Ministry of Public Security. Rodowicz died on 7 January 1949 during a brutal investigation at the Ministry headquarters at Koszykowa Street. According to the prosecutor and the Security Office, the reason for his death was a suicide jump from the window on the fourth floor of the building. It is possible that he was thrown out of it, or murdered in some other circumstances. On 12 January 1949, his body was secretly transported to a funeral facility and then anonymously buried at the Powązki Cemetery. His family was not notified of his death until March 1. On March 16, the family was informed by the gravedigger about the burial place and exhumed the body. The coffin was placed in a family grave at Stare Powązki.

A symbolic grave is also located in the "Łączka" quarters of the Military Cemetery in Warsaw.

== Decorations ==
- The Cross of Valour (twice: April 1943 and April 1944).
- Order of Virtutti Militari Class V (11 August 1944)
- The Commander's Cross of the Order of Polonia Restituta (posthumously, by the decision of President Lech Wałęsa of 25 July 1994, "for outstanding achievements in the fight for the independence of the Republic of Poland").
- The Grand Cross of the Order of Polonia Restituta (posthumously, by the decision of President Lech Kaczyński of 7 July 2008 "for outstanding merits for the independence of the Republic of Poland", the ceremony took place on 3 August during the celebration of the 64th anniversary of the outbreak of the Warsaw Uprising).
- Cross of the Home Army

== Honors ==
- He is the patron of the 265th Warsaw "Czata" Scouting Team and the 1st "Las" Scouting Team in Murowana Goślina (ZHR).
- He is also the patron of 129 Bialystok Senior Scouting Team.
- Memorial plaque on the first floor of the building of the Faculty of Architecture of the Warsaw University of Technology at 55 Koszykowa Street
- A commemorative plaque at the Ministry of Justice.
- In September 2005 his name was given to the street in the Ursynów district, Warsaw. In 2013, a memorial stone was unveiled on a strip between the roads (near an intersection with Ciszewskiego Street).
- His name was given to the street in Łódź, in the Teofilów neighborhood.
- He is the patron of the Second Veil of Scouting and Cub Teams from the ZHP Poznań-Wilda Troup.
- In 2011, the Museum of the Warsaw Uprising established the Jan Rodowicz "Anoda" Award, awarded in two categories: for the entirety of achievements and attitude to life, which is an example to follow for the younger generations, and for an exceptional act
- In 2018, a memorial plaque was installed on the house at Lwowska 7 in Warsaw, where he lived and was arrested by the Security Office.
