= Kedyw =

Polish World War II Home Army unit

Kedyw (Polish pronunciation: [ˈkɛdɨf], partial acronym of Kierownictwo Dywersji ("Directorate of Sabotage") was a Polish World War II Home Army force that conducted active and passive sabotage, propaganda and armed operations against Nazi German forces and collaborators.

== Operations ==
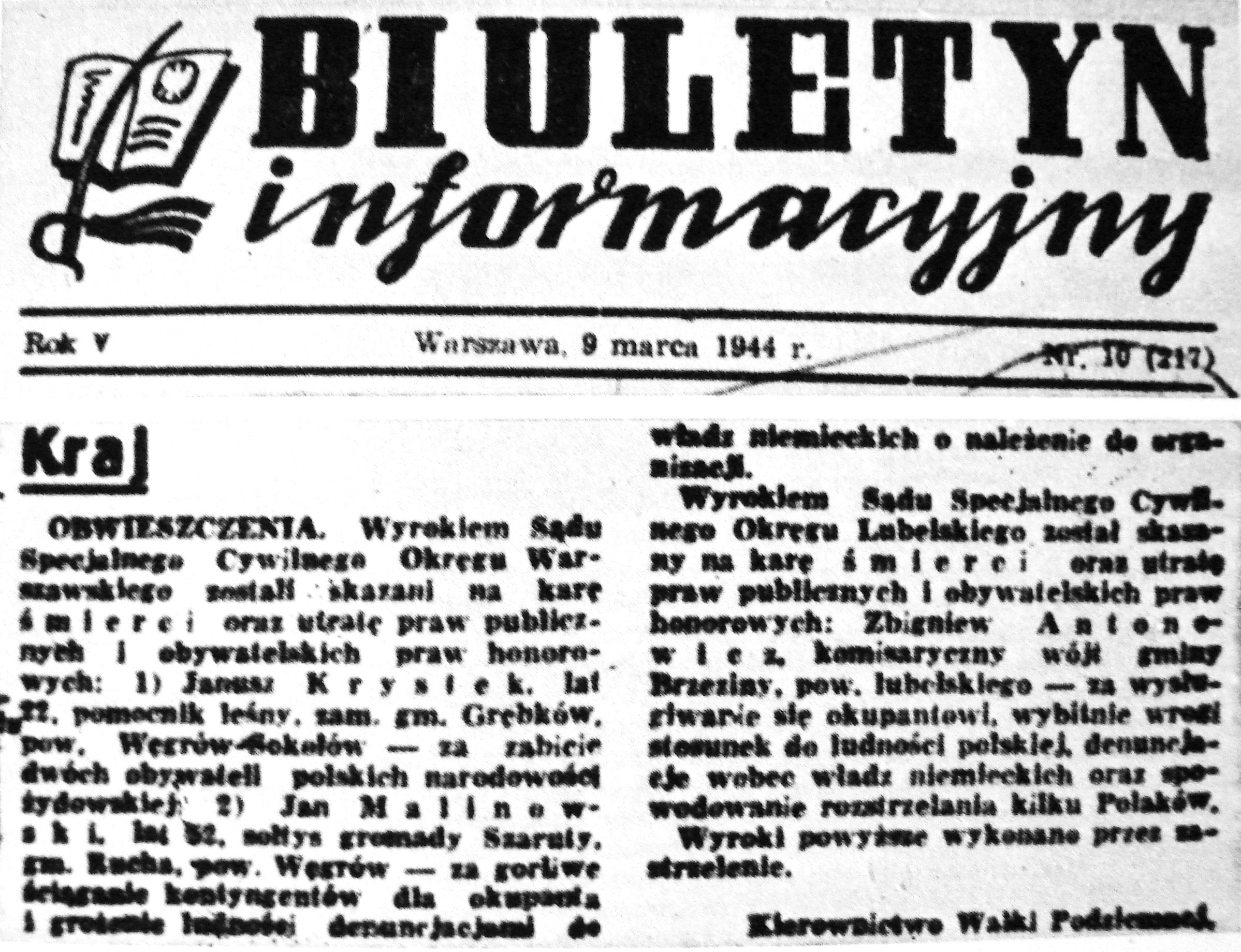
Biuletyn Informacyjny from March 9, 1944, informing about the execution of the death penalty for "killing two citizens of Polish Jewish nationality" by Kedyw.

Kedyw was created on January 22, 1943, from two pre-existing Home Army organisations: the Union of Retaliation and Wachlarz. Initially, the units were small and town-based. Eventually, as more were formed, some moved into forested areas to begin partisan warfare. Kedyw organized weapon and munition factories, military schools, intelligence, counter-intelligence, field hospitals and a communication network.

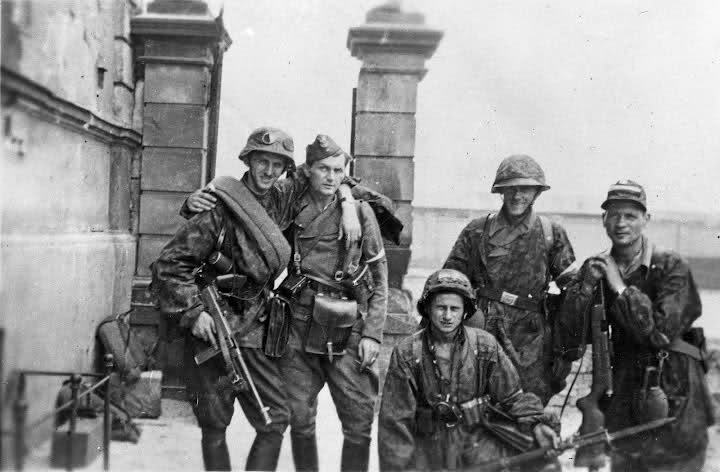
Insurgents from the Kedyw's Kolegium A on Stawki Street in the Wola district - Warsaw Uprising 1944

Most members of Kedyw were Boy Scouts from the Polish Scouting and Guiding Association and its wartime organisation, the Grey Ranks. Many of the officers were Silent Unseen: special agents trained in the United Kingdom and parachuted into occupied Poland. Selected Kedyw groups (patrole) carried out operations all over occupied Poland. Notable types of operations included:

- the sabotaging of railways, bridges and roads
  - the burning of trains and fuel depots
- the destruction or damaging of weapon factories working for the Wehrmacht
- the liberation of hundreds of prisoners and hostages
  - a famous such operation took place on March 26, 1943 and is known as Operation Arsenal
- executions of Nazi collaborators and traitors sentenced by an underground court
  - one of them involved Igo Sym, a Polish actor who had been informing the Germans about Home Army operations
- executions of particularly-brutal individuals among the German occupation troops, Gestapo, SS and police known as Operation Heads
  - those executed included SS and police General Franz Kutschera, killed on February 2, 1944, SS-Hauptscharfuhrer August Kretschmann, commandant of the Gęsiówka concentration camp, SS-Rottenführer Ewald Lange, SS-Obersturmführer Herbert Schultz, SS-Oberscharführer Franz Bürkl and many others (more than 2,000 people). Such individuals were officially sentenced to death for their crimes by the Polish Underground State court, which was delivered to those individuals. Many could not stand the pressure and returned to the Reich.
- executions of individuals from units collaborating with Nazi Germany such as Ukrainian Auxiliary Police involved in the killing of Poles
  - In Lviv, in late February and March 1944, the Ukrainische Hilfspolizei arrested a number of young men of Polish nationality. Many of them were later found dead and their Identity documents stolen. The Government Delegation for Poland started negotiations with the OUN-B. When they failed, Kedyw began an action called "Nieszpory" (Vespers) where 11 policemen were shot in retaliation and the murders of young Poles in Lviv stopped.
- Operation Belt, targeting German border guard stations on the night of 20–21 August 1944. A prominent member of the organization and a protagonist of Aleksander Kamiński's book Stones for the Rampart, Tadeusz Zawadzki, was killed during the operation in Sieczychy.

== Warsaw Uprising ==
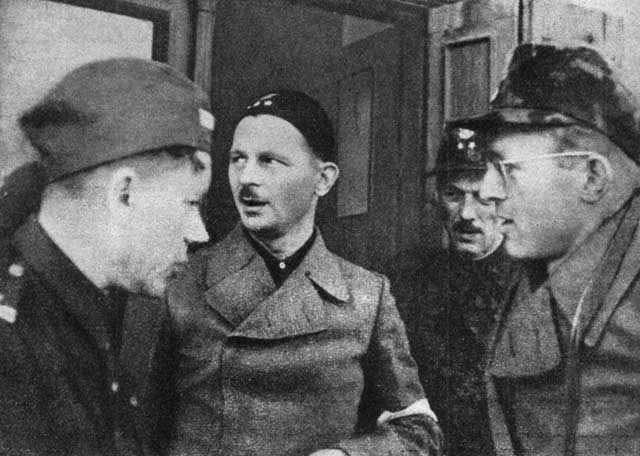
Members of Kedyw General Staff during the Warsaw Uprising: (from left) Jan Mazurkiewicz, Wacław Chojna, unknown soldier and Stanisław Wierzyński

Prior to the Warsaw Uprising, most of the Kedyw units in the Warsaw area were moved into the city and grouped into infantry battalions. Notable among them were "Zośka", "Parasol" and "Miotła". After fighting broke out, most of the Kedyw forces joined the Radosław Group. Kedyw units were among the most successful in the Uprising. The boy scouts not only had more experience than many regular soldiers but also had managed to collect more supplies and arms.

Kedyw units first took part in seizing control of Warsaw's Wola district. After two days of heavy fighting in the Powązki Cemetery in which all German attacks were repulsed with heavy casualties, the units withdrew overnight to the city centre and the Old Town, where they regrouped and defended their sectors until the capitulation of the uprising in October 1944.

== Commanders ==
- Brigadier-General Emil August Fieldorf (Nil) (until March 1944)
- Jan Mazurkiewicz (Radosław) (until August 1944)

== Bibliography ==
- HENRYK WITKOWSKI "KEDYW" OKRĘGU WARSZAWSKIEGO ARMII KRAJOWEJ W LATACH 1943 - 1944", Instytut Wydawniczy Związków Zawodowych 1985, ISBN 83-202-0217-5,
- Rybicka Hanna "Kedyw okręgu Warszawa Armii Krajowej Dokumenty - rok 1944", Wydawnictwa Uniwersytetu Warszawskiego 2009, ISBN 978-83-235-0508-2
- Drzyzga Bernard "Kedyw Okręgu AK Łódź i 60 Pułk AK", 1988,
- Jan Gozdawa-Gołębiowski "Kedyw "Białowieży", Książka i Wiedza 1990, ISBN 83-05-11968-8, ISBN 978-83-05-11968-9,

== See also ==
- Armia Krajowa
- Cichociemni
- Polish Secret State
- Kotwica
