= Zbigniew Leszek Grzywaczewski =

- Born: July 19, 1920; Warsaw
- Died: August 28, 1993; Gdańsk
- Awards: Silver Cross of Merit

Zbigniew Leszek Grzywaczewski (19 July 1920 – 28 August 1993) was a Polish firefighter, activist, amateur photographer, and a participant in the Warsaw Uprising.

== Biography ==
He was the son of Stanisława and Zofii. He was a member of the 21st Warsaw Scout Troop. He graduated from the Stephen Báthory State Secondary School and High School Number 1 in Warsaw, (he attended classes with Jan Bytnar and Maciej Dawidowski, among others). He graduated high school with his Matura in 1939. During the German occupation, he worked in the Warsaw Fire Department starting in 1941. As a firefighter, he was sent to the Warsaw Ghetto during the response to the uprising, likely working there from April 21 to May 15, 1943. His duties included ensuring that the fire did not spread to the so-called Aryan side of Warsaw. During the occupation, Grzywaczewski was also involved in the underground resistance movement. During the Warsaw Uprising of 1944, he served in the fire department of the Security Corps. He was wounded in the leg during the uprising.

After the war, he worked for the fire department of Katowice. He then graduated from the Faculty of Shipbuilding in the Gdańsk Polytechnic University and worked for the Polish Register of Shipping and the Maritime Institute. He was also an editor of the journal Budownictwo Okrętowe.

He became a two-time recipient of the Silver Cross of Merit.

== Photography ==
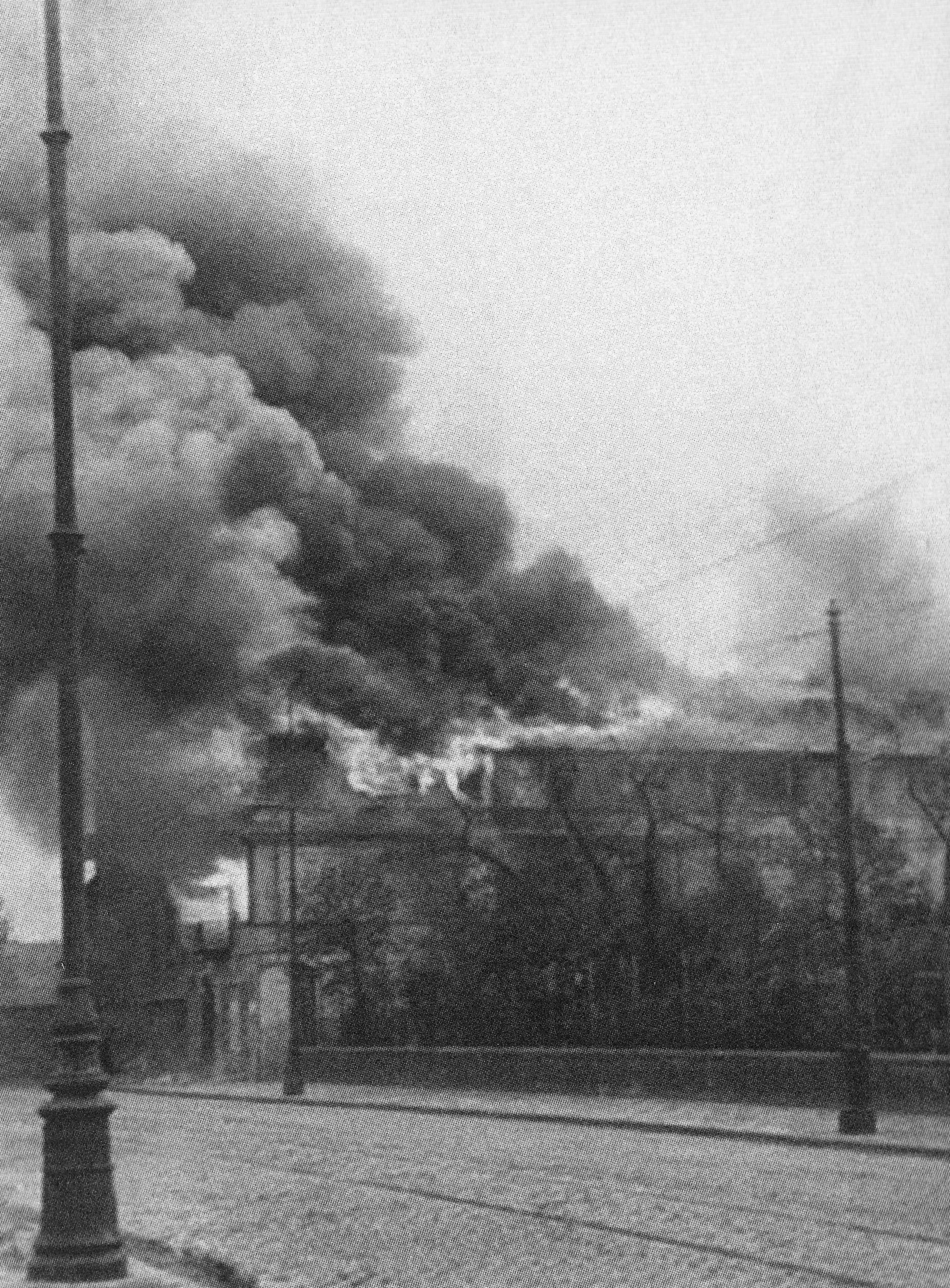
Photograph taken by Grzywaczewski during the Warsaw Ghetto Uprising.

Throughout the German occupation, he took amateur photographs, including during the Warsaw Ghetto Uprising. Grzywaczewski's photographs are considered to be the only known to have been taken inside the ghetto by a non-German during the uprising. Prints of his photos are in the collection of the United States Holocaust Memorial Museum in Washington, D.C. and the Jewish Historical Institute in Warsaw. In 2022, a negative containing 33 photographs of the ghetto taken by Grzywaczewski was discovered in a family collection.

== Private life ==
He was married to Marią Magdaleną Paprocką (1923–2013). They had two children: a daughter, Dorotę (born 1953), and a son, Maciej (born 1954), a film producer, entrepreneur, publisher, and democratic opposition activist of the PRL. His grandson is the sociologist Mikołaj Pawlak.

== Legacy ==
In 2025, Zbigniew Grzywaczewski's memorabilia were donated to the Museum of the Second World War in Gdánsk.
