= Jerzy Gawin =

Polish scoutmaster and anti-Nazi activist

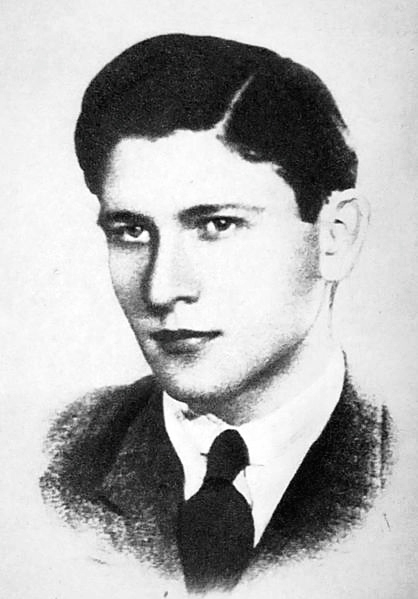
- Born: 20 September 1922
- Died: 23 September 1944 (aged 22)
- Parent(s): -Marcel Gawin -Janina z Koszelików (Gawin)

Jerzy Gawin otherwise known as "Słoń" (Polish for elephant), was a Polish scoutmaster, part of Gray Ranks and an anti-Nazi activist. He fought in Batalion Zośka during Operation Arsenal and died in the Warsaw Uprising. He also appeared a number of times in Polish literature, most notably in Aleksander Kamiński's Stones for the Rampart.

== Biography ==
Born on 20 September 1922 in Warsaw. His father- Marcel Gawin was the owner of the company Pomoc szkolna. His mother, Janina z Koszelików, was presumably a house keeper. Jerzy from a certain age started the education in III Gymnasium named after Hugo Kołłątaj and upon graduation, decided that he would continue his education. He passed the matura exam in 1941 and got into Studia Politechniczne. After the start of World War II, he began his service in the Gray Ranks. He fought in the Warsaw Uprising as a chief commander of the first crew- "Felek" of the Batalion Zośka and died on 23 September 1944, during army's backup from Czarniakowo. His body hasn't been found, though a few people claim to have found without the actual evidence.
