= Tadeusz Zawadzki =

Polish anti-Nazi resistance fighter (1921–1943)

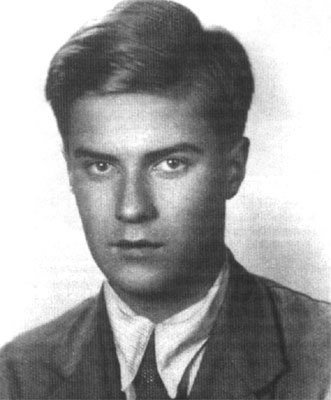
- Zawadzki c. 1940

Personal details
- Born: January 24, 1921 Warsaw, Poland
- Died: August 20, 1943 (aged 22) Sieczychy, Poland
- Parent: Józef Zawadzki (father)
- Nicknames: Kajman; Kotwicki; Lech Pomarańczowy; Tadeusz; Zośka

Military service
- Allegiance: Home Army
- Branch/service: Grey Ranks
- Rank: Podporucznik (Second lieutenant)

Tadeusz Leon Józef Zawadzki (Polish: [taˈdɛ.uʐ zaˈvat͡skʲi]; January 24, 1921 – August 20, 1943) was a Polish scout instructor, scoutmaster, Home Army second lieutenant, commander of assault groups in Warsaw, one of the protagonists of Aleksander Kamiński's book Kamienie na szaniec. Because of his beautiful, girlish appearance, he was given the nickname "Zośka", meaning "Sophia".

== Biography ==
Zawadzki was born on January 24, 1921, in Warsaw as a son of Józef Zawadzki, a chemist engineer, professor, dean of the Faculty of Chemistry and rector of the Warsaw University of Technology, and later vice-rector of the secret Warsaw University of Technology, who was active in the Union of Retaliation under the alias "Juliusz", and Leona (née Siemieńska), a teacher and educational activist. Zawadzki was born in a tenement house at 58 Piękna Street. In the mid-1930s, the family moved to a flat on the ground floor of the so-called Professors' House at 75 Koszykowa Street, which was a part of the Polytechnic's buildings complex. During summer the Zawadzki family often stayed in their house at Queen Hedwig Street 11 in Zalesie Dolne.

Tadeusz Zawadzki began his studies at the Private School of the Society of the Mazovian School at Klonowa Street 16. In September 1933, he began his education at Stefan Batory State Gymnasium in Warsaw. In "Batory", Zawadzki continued his education in high school, in a class with mathematical and physical profile. Later soldiers of Warsaw Assault Groups: Jan Bytnar, Aleksy Dawidowski and Jan Wuttke studied in the same class.

From the Autumn of 1933, Zawadzki was a member of the 23rd Warsaw Scouting Team "Bolesław Chrobry", called the "Orangery". He passed his Matura exam at the end of May 1939. Following the outbreak of the war, he left Warsaw to the east on September 6 as a member of the scouting marching Warsaw Banner.

Zawadzki was active in the underground structures since October 1939, and when the scouts from the 23rd WDH formed the so-called War Orangery in 1941, he was elected commander of it under the alias "Lech Pomarańczowy" (Orange Lech).

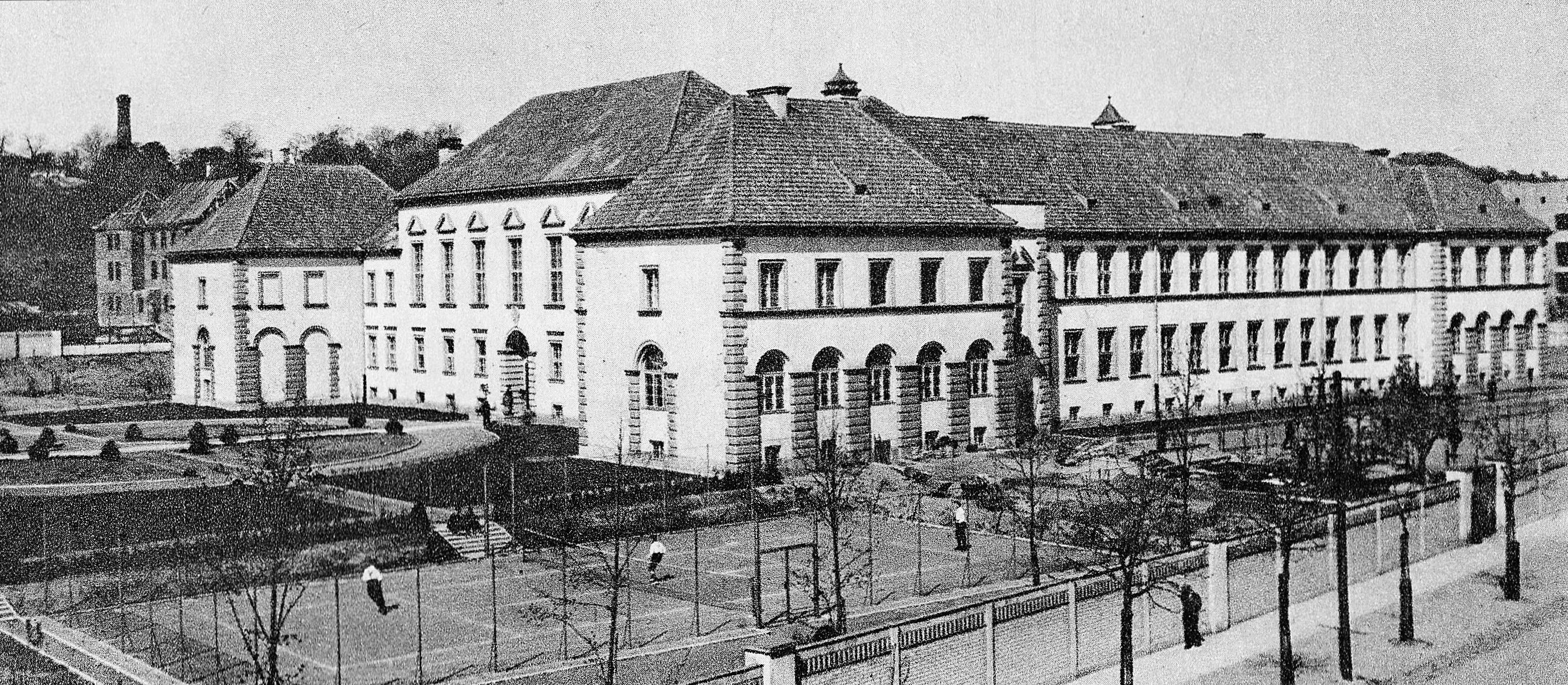
Tadeusz Zawadzki graduated from The Stefan Batory State Gymnasium in 1939

At the same time, in December 1939 and January 1940, he took part in the activities of small sabotage of a secret left-wing organization Polish People's Independence Action. From January to July 1940, he was a courier in the prison cell of the ZWZ (organized by Captain Zygmunt Hempel and Halina Starczewska-Chorążyna, later headed by Kazimierz Gorzkowski).

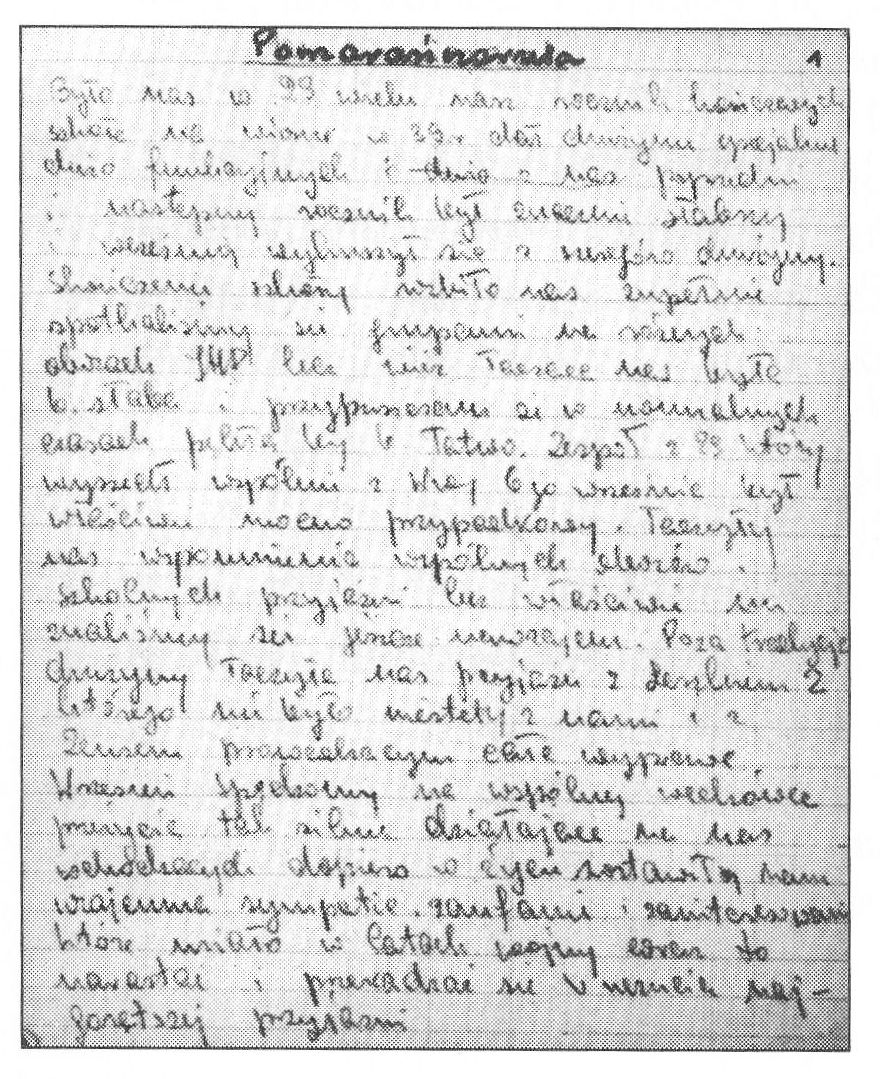
The first page of his account, on the basis of which Aleksander Kamiński wrote Kamienie na szaniec ( Stones for the Rampart) (1943)

In March 1941, together with his team, Zawadzki entered the Grey Ranks and took command over the Upper Mokotów Troup in the South District of the Warsaw Banner. This troup immediately joined the "Wawer" Small Sabotage Organization, in which "Zośka" was the commander of the Upper Mokotow District in the South District. At that time Tadeusz was one of the most outstanding executors of some of the most famous actions of small sabotage. For the largest number of "anchors" painted in his district, he was awarded the honorary title "Kotwicki" (Anchor-man) by the Commander-in-Chief of "Wawer" Aleksander Kamiński. Together with his troup, he also participated in the "N" Action (subversive propaganda in German conducted by BiP KG AK).

After graduating from the Petty Scoutmaster Course (" The School behind the Forest") in May–June 1942, he received the rank of petty scoutmaster and the instructor pseudonym "Kajman" on August 15, 1942. On September 13, 1942, he organized all-day field exercises for his troop in the Chojnowski Forest near Warsaw.

As a result of the reorganization of the Warsaw Banner of the Grey Ranks in November 1942, under the alias "Tadeusz", Zawadzki became the troup leader of the "Center" hive, the commander of the Warsaw Banner Assault Groups (consisting of 4 troops), and at the same time the deputy of Lieutenant Ryszard Białous "Jerzy" – military commander of the GS, i.e. the Special Unit "Jerzy", one of the dispatching units of Home Army Kedyw (Directorate of Diversion) which established at that time.

After graduating from the Substitute Course of the Officers' School of Infantry Reserves, in January 1943 he was appointed the rank of officer cadet.

Probably at that time, due to the significant burden of organizational duties, he had to stop his education from 1940 onwards. Zawadzki studied at the State School of Machine Building – acting openly in place of the State Higher School of Machine and Electrical Engineering in Warsaw named after H. Wawelberg and S. Rotwand. From 1942 Zawadzki studied at the Faculty of Chemistry of the Higher State Technical School – i.e. the secret Warsaw University of Technology.

In the last days of April 1943, at his father's request, Zawadzki wrote a short report describing the activity of "Orangery" and the Grey Ranks, as well as the course of events during Operation Arsenal. It became the basis for Aleksander Kamiński's book Kamienie na szaniec [Stones for the Ramaprt].

He was arrested accidentally at the end of June or the beginning of July 1943, and spent a week or two in a correction labor camp at Gęsia Street ("The Goose house").

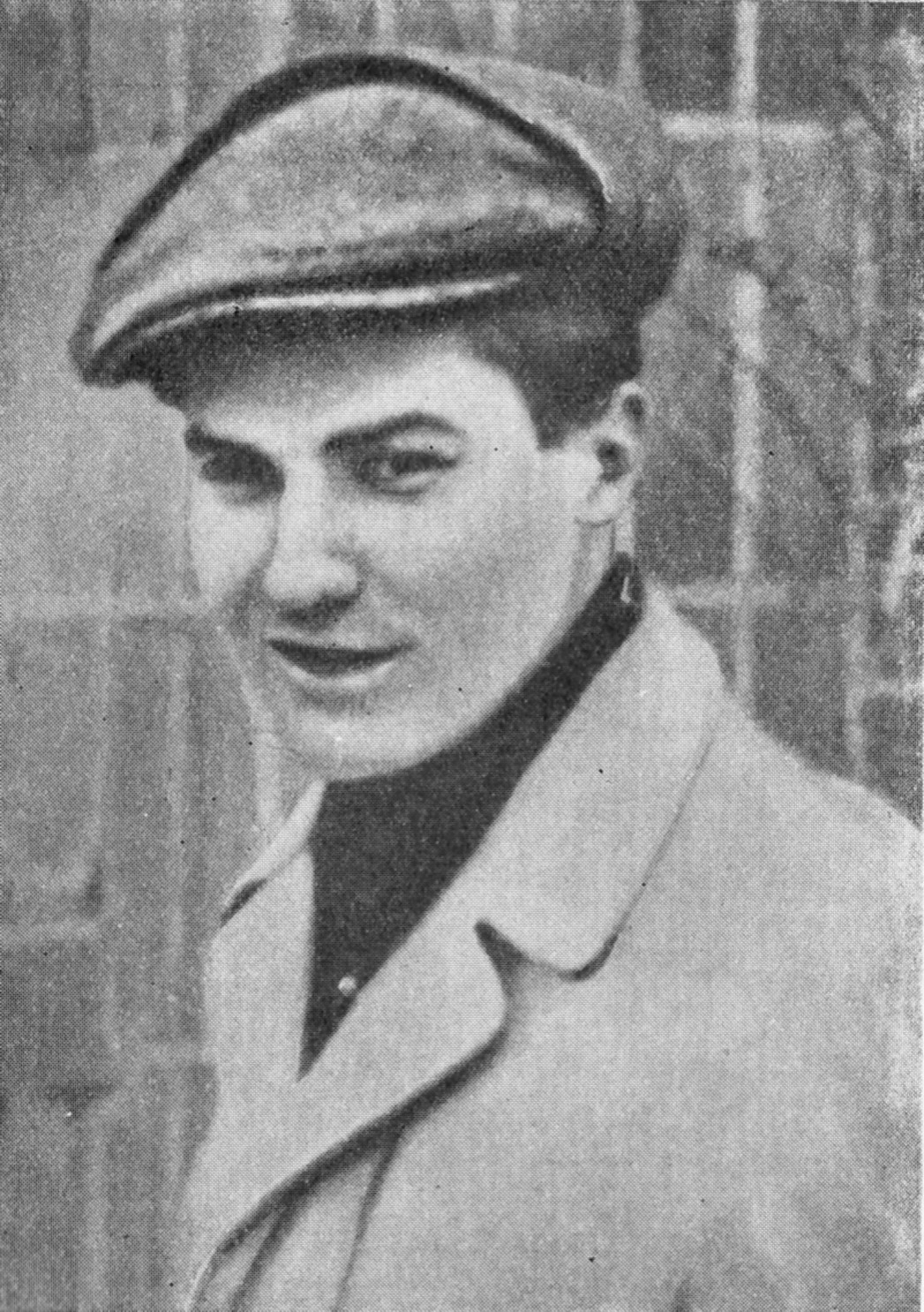
Tadeusz Zawadzki "Zośka"

After completing his first scouting course (May–June), he was awarded the title of scoutmaster on August 15, 1943. At that time he was appointed second lieutenant of the infantry reserve.

He died in an attack on the watchtower of Grenzschutzpolizei in Sieczychy near Wyszków on the night of August 20–21, 1943, taking part in the "Tape" action as an observer.

His name was given to the Home Army Battalion of the Grey Ranks – the Zośka Battalion.

== Sabotage Operations ==
=== Participant ===
- During the night from December 31, 1942, to January 1, 1943, Zawadzki took part in the Operation "Wieniec II" – commanded a patrol that had blown up a railway passage near Kraśnik,
- On January 16, 1943, Zawadzki commanded the execution of a death sentence on Ludwik Herbert at 26 Walecznych Street (Herbert informed the Gestapo about Andrzej Honowski, who ran a conspiratorial explosives factory for Kedyw KG AK at Asfaltowa Street 12, who was later murdered),
- On February 2, 1943, Zawadzki took part in the evacuation of underground materials from Jan Błoński's apartment at 23 Bracka Street, and from that month, since "Jerzy", threatened with arrest, had left Warsaw, "Zośka", in addition to being the commander of Warsaw's Special Units, also became the commander of Unit "Jerzy".
- On March 26, 1943, Zawadzki commanded a group named "Attack" during Operation Arsenal ("Mexico II"), when 21 prisoners, including his friend Jan Bytnar "Rudy", were liberated from the hands of the Gestapo. In May 1943, he received the Cross of Valour for taking part in this operation.
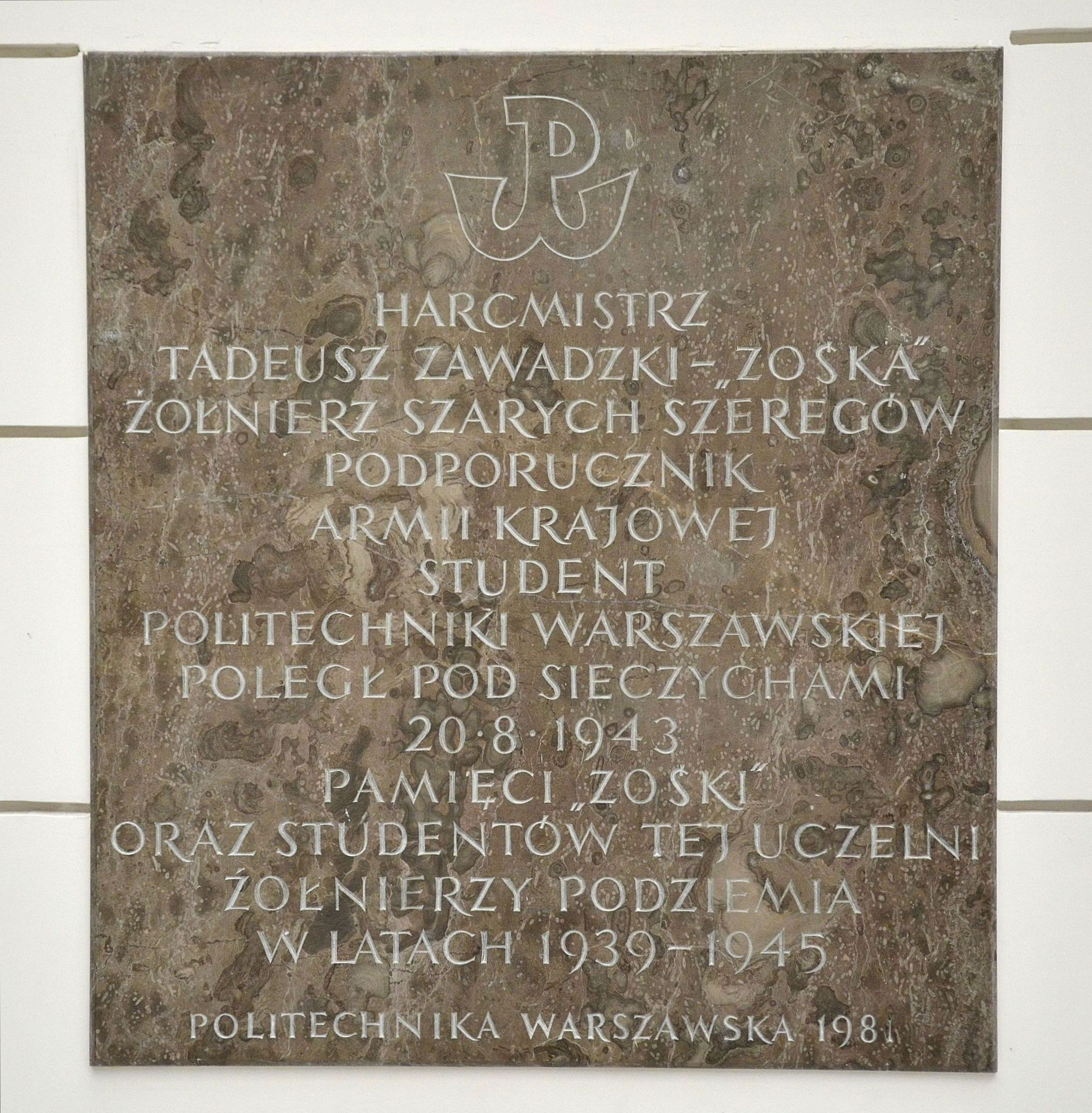
- A memorial plaque in the Main Hall in the Main Building of the Warsaw University of Technology
  On May 6, 1943, he participated (as an observer) in an attempt to kidnap SS-Oberscharführer Herbert Schultz (the Gestapo investigator of assault groups), which ended with Schultz's death,
- At the same time, he was also involved in preparations to free Florian Marciniak, Head of the "Grey Ranks" (unsuccessful actions: "Mexico IV", "Chicago" and "The White Rose"), from the hands of the Germans.

=== Commander ===
- The liberation of prisoners in Celestynów during the night of May 19–20, 1943 (in the presence of Captain "Mietek" – Mieczysław Kurkowski, the direct supervisor of the Special Unit "Jerzy" in Kedyw KG AK, who supervised the action, which was an officer's exam for "Zośka"),
- Blowing up a railway bridge near Czarnocin over Wolbórka river on the night of June 5/6, 1943.

== Decorations ==
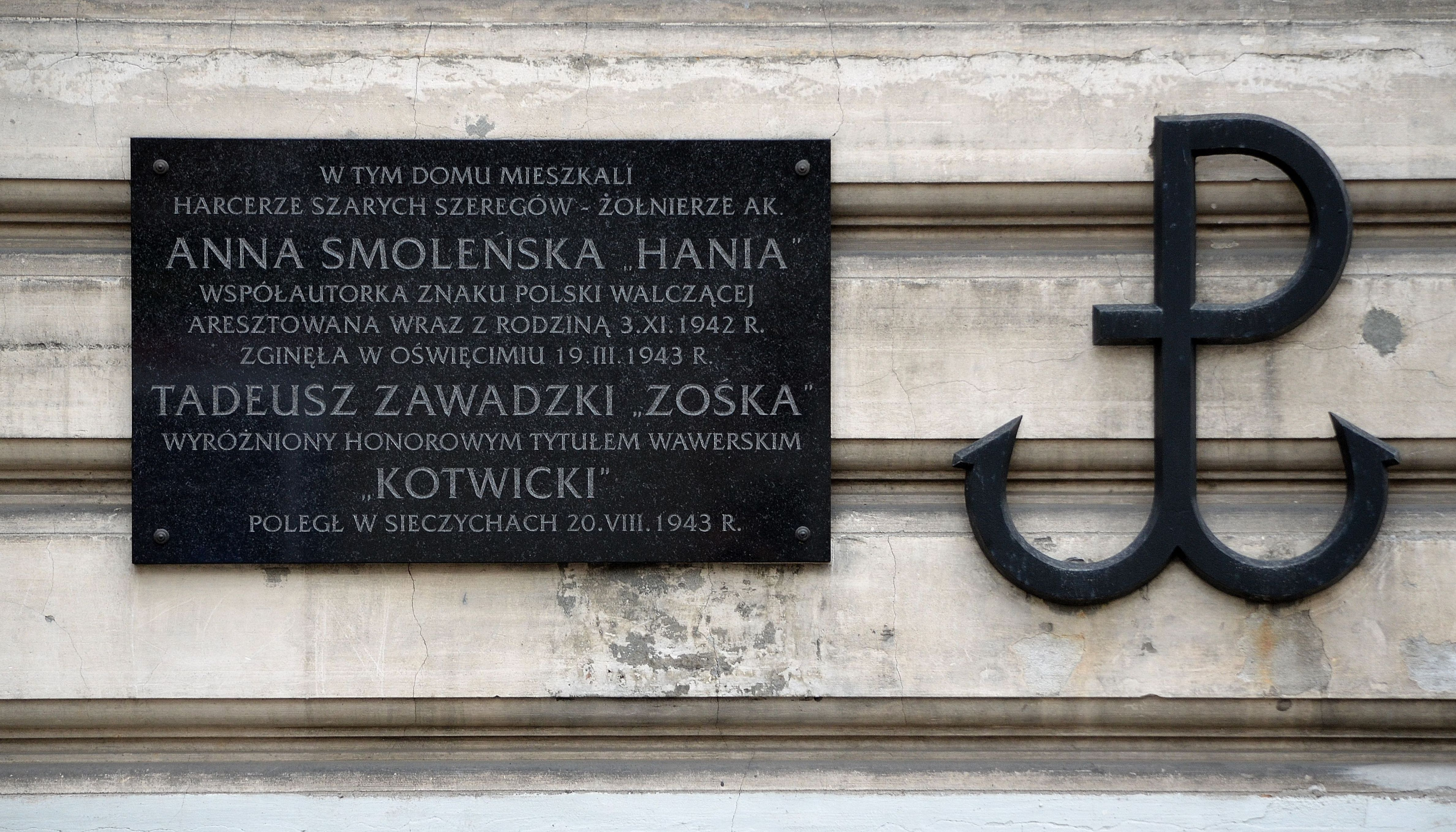
A memorial plaque at the House of Professors of the Warsaw University of Technology at Koszykowa Street 75, where Tadeusz Zawadzki lived together with his parents and sister.

- Silver Cross of Order of Virtuti Militari
- Commander's Cross with Star of Order of Polonia Restituta (posthumously in 2009).
- Cross of Valour (twice in 1943).

== Honors ==
- The commemorative plaque in the Main Hall in the main building of the Warsaw University of Technology unveiled on October 28, 1981.
- A commemorative plaque on the side wall of the Professors' House at 75 Koszykowa Street, where Tadeusz Zawadzki lived with his parents and sister.
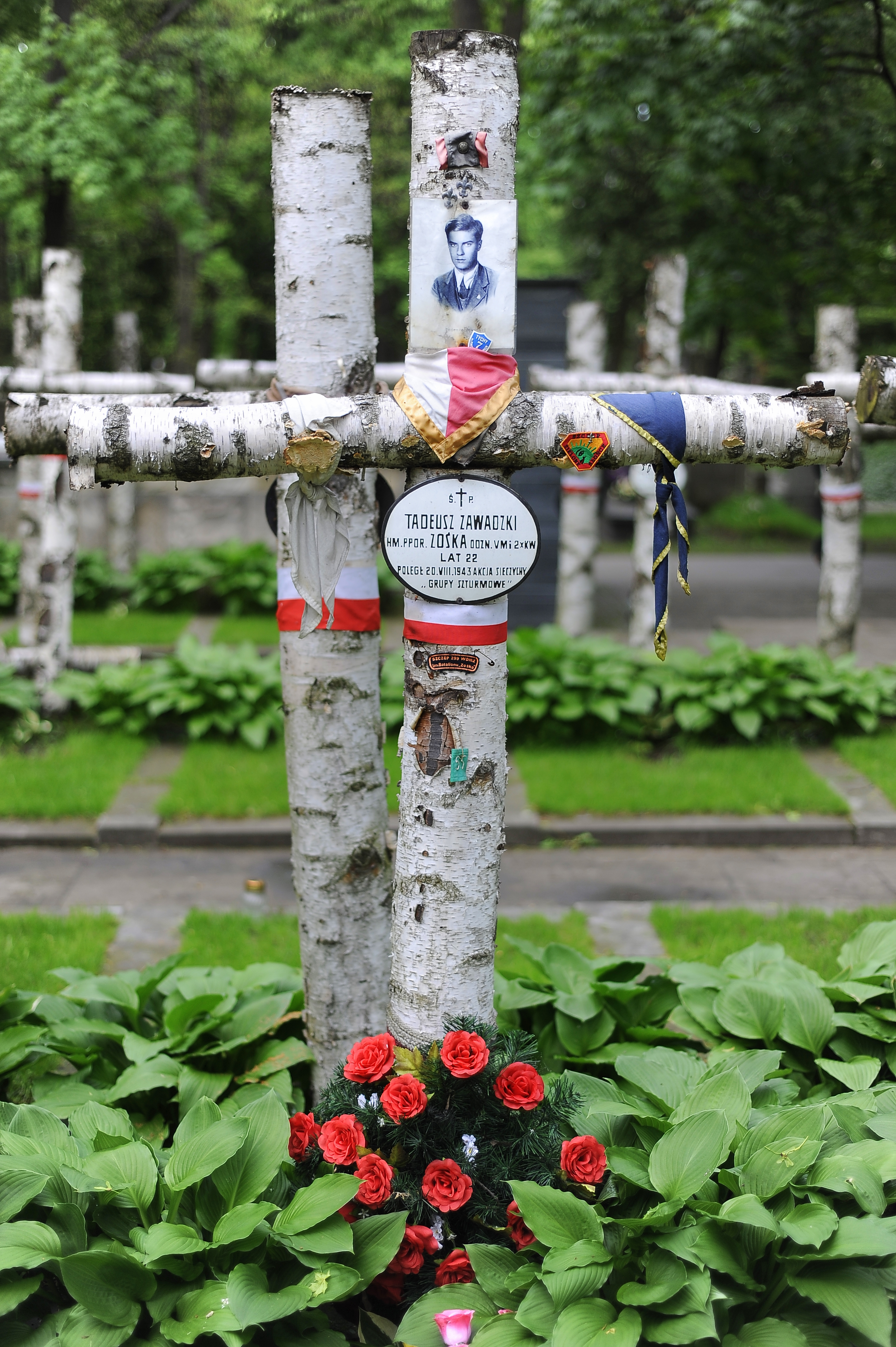
- Cross on Tadeusz Zawadzki's grave in the Zośka Battalion quarters at the Powązki Warsaw Military Cemetery.
  A free-standing plaque in the village of Sieczychy, where Zośka died on August 20, 1943
- In 2017, the local authorities of Piaseczno and the ZHP Warsaw Banner decided to purchase a wooden house in Zalesie Dolne, which from 1929 belonged to the Zawadzki's family, and where meetings and training sessions of the Grey Ranks were held during the occupation. An education centre is to be established in the building
