= Stanisław Broniewski =

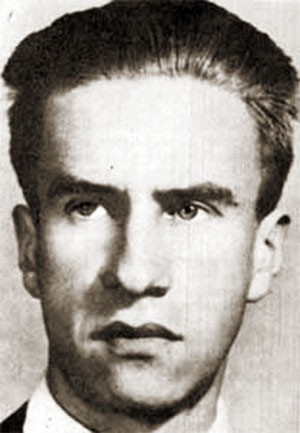
- Born: 29 December 1915; Warsaw, Congress Poland, Russian Empire
- Died: 30 December 2000 (aged 85); Warsaw, Poland

Stanisław Broniewski alias Stefan Orsza, Witold, K. Krzemień (29 December 1915 – 30 December 2000) was a Polish economist, Chief Scouts of the Gray Ranks and Second lieutenant of the Home Army during the World War II.

== Biography ==
During Siege of Warsaw in September 1939, he co-organized the Scouts Emergency. During the German occupation Poland in the Gray Ranks. Commander of the Operation Arsenal. Participant of the Warsaw Uprising. Then, after its fall, a prisoner of the Bergen-Belsen concentration camp. From 1945, he was the commander of Scouts among Poles in Germany.

After war, he returned to the country in 1946. From 1946 to 1948 he was the deputy director of the Department at the Central Planning Office. Later he was employed as an official in Społem. In December 1956 he took part in the ZHP Congress in Łódź. He then joined the Supreme Scout Council of Polish Scouting and Guiding Association (ZHP), in which he remained until 1958. Together with a group of Catholic activists, he intended to run for the Sejm in the 1957 legislative elections, but his name was deleted by the communist authorities.

He defended his Doctor of Philosophy and did a Habilitation in urban economics. In 1966 he became an assistant professor at the University of Łódź. He was an honorary citizen of Warsaw and honorary citizen of Poznań

== Awards ==
- Order of the White Eagle (1995)
- Silver Cross of Virtuti Militari
- Golden Cross of Merit (1973)
- Silver Cross of Merit with Swords
- Warsaw Uprising Cross
- Army Medal for War, four times
- Medal for Warsaw 1939–1945
- Home Army Cross
- Partisan Cross
- Cross of Merit (Polish Scouting and Guiding Association)
