= Rodowicz =

Rodowicz is a Polish surname. Notable people with the surname include:

- Jan Rodowicz (1923–1949), Polish Army officer and Scout
- Maryla Rodowicz (born 1945), Polish singer and actress
