= Sławomir Maciej Bittner =

Polish scoutmaster and second lieutenant

Sławomir Maciej Bittner "Maciek"
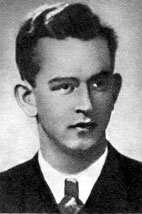
- Nickname: Rudy
- Born: 21 July 1923; Warsaw, Poland
- Died: 28 February 1944 (aged 20) Warsaw, German-occupied Poland
- Allegiance: Poland
- Branch: Armia Krajowa (Home Army)
- Rank: Second Lieutenant
- Conflicts: World War II
- Awards: : Krzyż Walecznych (Cross of Valour); Virtuti Militari, V class

Sławomir Maciej Bittner (codename: Maciek, Kajman Wojak; born 21 July 1923, Warsaw – died 28 February 1944, Warsaw, Poland) was a Polish scoutmaster (podharcmistrz) and second lieutenant of the Armia Krajowa.

Arrested on 18 February 1944 by the Gestapo, he was killed, probably shot to death, several weeks later on 28 February at Pawiak prison. He was 20 years old.

== Major sabotage actions ==
- commander of the section "Sten I" in the "Arsenal action" on 26 March 1943
- commander of the liquidation action of SS-Obersturmbannführer Schultz on 6 May 1943
- commander of the group "Więżniarka" during the rescue action of Polish prisoners on the train station in Celestynów on 19 May 1943
- commander of a group in the "Sól action" on 27 May 1943
- covered a bridge during the "Czarnocin action" on 5/6 June 1943 in Targówek
- covered a liquidation action of a Gestapo agent, executed in June 1943 by Wanda "Lena" Gertz
- commander of a cover group during the "Góral action" on 12 August 1943
- commander of the group "Atak" during the "Taśma action" in Sieczychy near Wyszków on 20 August 1943
- commander of the group "Lotnicy" during the "Wilanów action" on 26 September 1943

He was awarded the Cross of Valour (3 April 1943) and the Silver Cross of the Order of Virtuti Militari.

== See also ==
- Polish Secret State
- Związek Harcerstwa Polskiego
- Mury
- Battalion Zośka
- Battalion Parasol
- Jan Bytnar
