= Operation Arsenal =

1943 escape of Jan Bytnar from Nazi German imprisonment

- Part of World War II
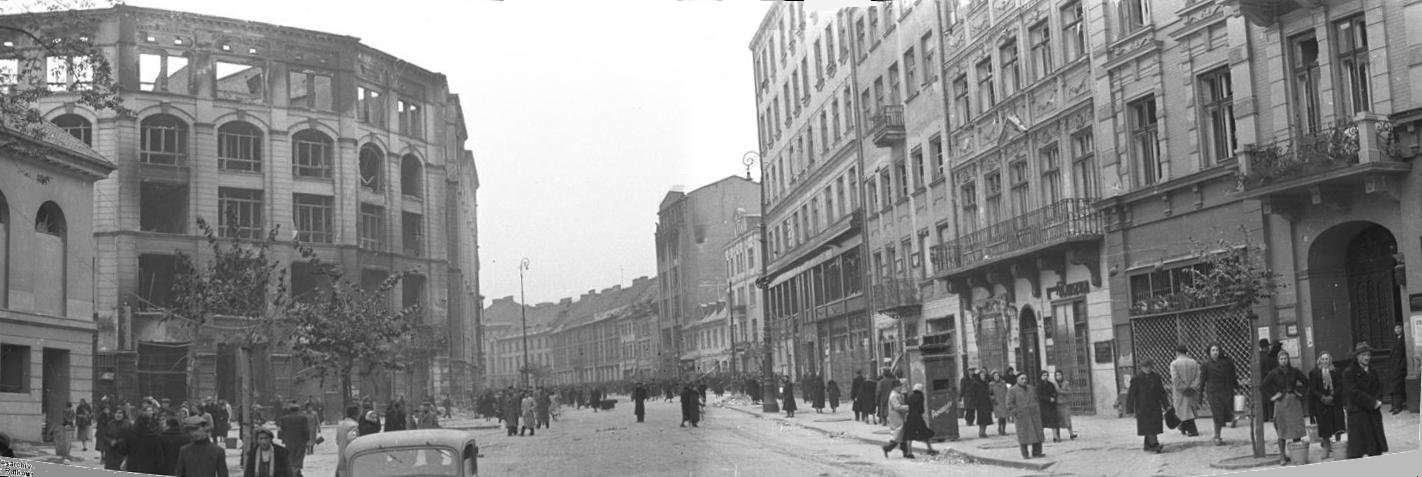
- Długa Street where the Operation Arsenal took place
Date	March 26, 1943
Location	Warsaw, General Government (German-occupied Poland)
Result	Successful operation: release of 21 prisoners, including Jan Bytnar

Belligerents
Gray Ranks	Germany

Commanders and leaders
Stanisław Broniewski; Tadeusz Zawadzki	Unknown, probably none

Strength
28 men	~15-20 men

Casualties and losses
2 dead 1 captured (subsequently executed); 140 Polish and Jewish hostages killed in reprisal	4 killed 9 wounded

The Operation Arsenal (Polish: Akcja pod Arsenałem), code name: "Meksyk II" (Mexico 2), was the first major operation by the Gray Ranks, Polish Underground formation during the Nazi German occupation of Poland. It took place on March 26, 1943 in Warsaw. Its name was coined after the Royal Arsenal, in front of which the action took place. The plan was to free the troop leader Jan Bytnar "Rudy", who was arrested together with his father by the Gestapo. The operation was executed by 28 scouts led by Warsaw Standard Commander Stanisław Broniewski "Orsza". The initiator and the commander of the "Attack Group" was Tadeusz Zawadzki "Zośka".

The successfully conducted operation led to the release of Jan Bytnar and 24 other prisoners, including another Storm Group troop leader, Henryk Ostrowski "Henryk", and 6 women, in an attack on the prison van that was taking the inmates from Pawiak Prison to Gestapo Headquarters at Szucha Avenue. Bytnar himself died four days later on account of injuries sustained due to German torture. Both of his interrogators, identified as Hubert Schulz and Ewald Lange, were assassinated by Szare Szeregi within two months.

== Orgin ==
Jan Bytnar "Rudy"

From the night of March 18th to 19th, 1943, the Gestapo arrested Henryk Ostrowski "Heniek," the commander of the "Praga" Troop, along with his wife, Walentyna, whom he had married a few weeks earlier. In their apartment, the Germans found explosives, weapons, and ammunition, as well as notes likely containing the address of Jan Bytnar "Rudy", the commander of the "Południe" ("Orchard") Troop.

"Rudy" was arrested along with his father Stanisław on Tuesday, March 23, 1943, at 4:30 a.m. in the Bytnar family's apartment. They were taken out onto the street and transported in two different prison vans to Pawiak Prison. A brutal interrogation of "Rudy" began. To extract a confession as quickly as possible, he was beaten with whips and sticks by four Gestapo officers.

In their basement, they found, among other things, torn German flags, powder fuse rings, underground press, posters and leaflets, as well as stamps used to paint the Fighting Poland Anchor.

== Operation "Meksyk I" - the first attempt ==
Having found out about Jan's arrest, that same day, Tadeusz Zawadzki "Zośka" devised a plan and assembled a group ready to attack the prison van transporting Bytnar late in the afternoon after the interrogation from Szucha Avenue to Pawiak.

The information that "Rudy" was on the return transport was relayed by telephone by Zygmunt Kaczyński, "Wesoły." Kaczyński worked as a salesman for the E. Wedel company, and his frequent visits with sweets for the Germans employed at Szucha allowed him to move relatively freely around the building. This enabled him to conduct surveillance and gather information for the Polish resistance movement.

However, the operation, later codenamed "Mexico I," was canceled . The required consent for its execution could not be obtained from the commander of the Kedyw Dispatch Units of the Home Army Headquarters, Jan Kiwerski "Lipiński."

Meanwhile, as a result of torture used by the Germans during the investigation, "Rudy" was taken to the Pawiak prison hospital on the second day after his arrest, suffering from severe injuries and the first symptoms of uremia. Since he was no longer able to move on his own, he was taken on a stretcher to the next interrogation at Szucha Street.

== Operation "Meksyk II" ==
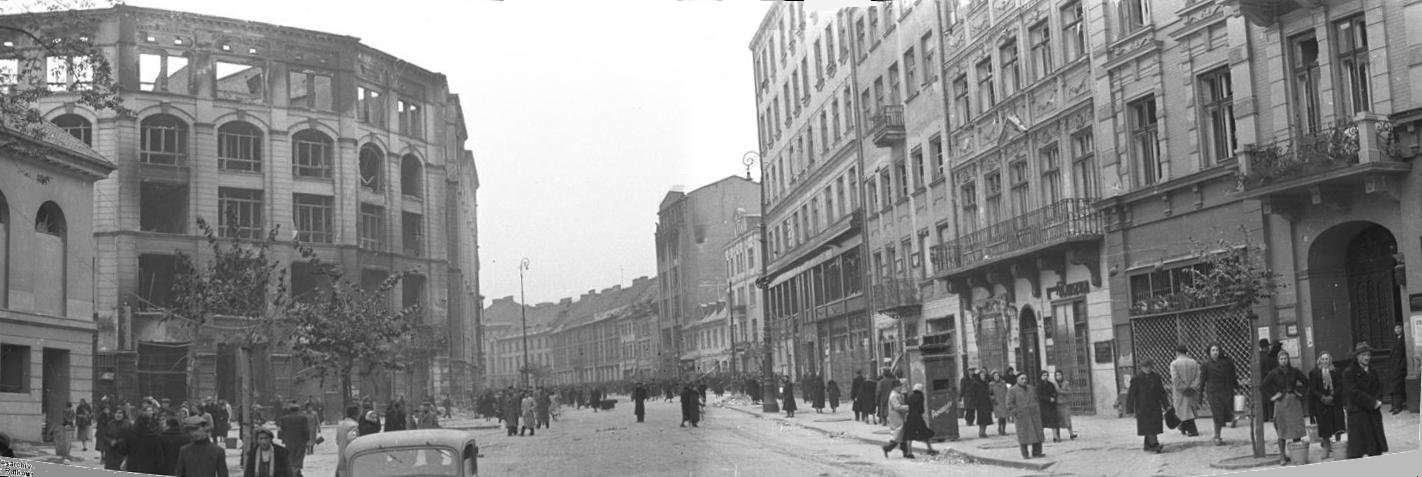
Długa Street, Warsaw

Basing on the previous attempt, Tadeusz "Zośka" Zawadzki kept the core strategy unchanged. The ambush was set for the intersection where Długa Street turned onto Nalewki. As the prison van traveled from Szucha Avenue toward Pawiak Prison, resistance fighters would launch an immediate frontal assault with gasoline bottles to stall the vehicle, neutralize the two rear guards with handguns, and rescue the prisoners inside.

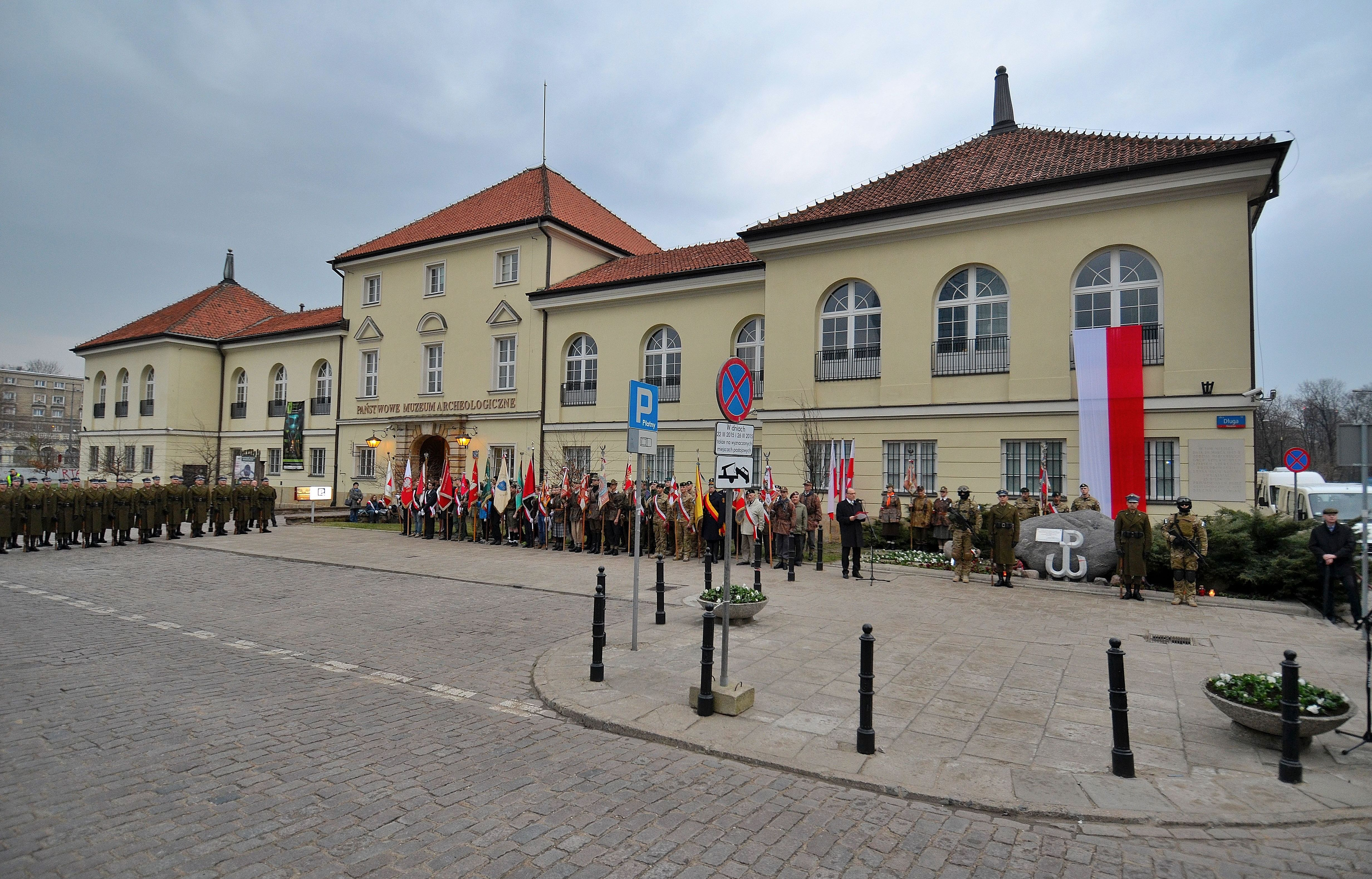
The Arsenal, Warsaw

The signal to begin and end the operation was to be a whistle blown by the commander. After liberating the prisoners, the group planned to retreat on foot along Długa Street toward the Old Town.

Due to "Zośka's" emotional involvement, on March 23, the Head of the Grey Ranks, Florian Marciniak ("Nowak"), appointed Stanisław Broniewski ("Orsza") to command the rescue of "Rudy."

Events did not go as planned. Alarmed by shots "Zośka" fired at an intervening Blue Polish policeman, the driver of the German truck aborted his right turn from Bielańska onto Nalewki Street and instead drove straight down Długa Street.

During the prolonged firefight, success was sealed by a direct assault led by "Zośka." After neutralizing a German guard who tried to take cover behind the vehicle, the team opened the tailgate. A total of 21 prisoners (nearly half were women) were freed, including "Rudy".

At 17:45, "Orsza" blew his whistle to mark the end of the action, and the group began retreating. However, as the last squad moved down Długa Street toward Krasiński Square, Germans opened fire from the Arbeitsamt (Employment Office) in the Palace under the Four Winds. Despite being critically wounded in the abdomen, Aleksy Dawidowski "Alek" threw a grenade into the palace gate, clearing the path for their escape.

== Post events ==
That same evening, Bytnar was carried by his colleagues to Gustaw Wuttke's apartment at Kazimierzowska Street 15. From there, on Sunday, March 28th, he was transferred to an apartment at Karłowicza Street 18.

Due to the deteriorating health of Bytnar, who had been brutally assaulted during interrogation, surgical intervention was the only chance to save his life. However, safety concerns precluded surgery in a Warsaw hospital. Dr. Trojanowski undertook the operation in a private apartment.

On the day of the scheduled surgery for March 30, "Zośka," with the assistance of Jan Rossman and Dr. Juliusz Majkowski, managed to arrange for his friend to be transported by a Municipal Sanitary Institution car to the Wolski Hospital at Płocka Street 26. However, Bytnar's condition was already critical, and doctors were unable to help him.

"Rudy" died shortly after being transported to Wolski Hospital, on Tuesday, March 30, 1943, at approximately 4:30 p.m. On the same day, despite surgery performed by Andrzej Trojanowski, "Alek" died at the Infant Jesus Hospital on Nowogrodzka Street as a result of wounds sustained during the operation.

On May 3rd, 1943, Commander of the Armed Forces in Poland, Stefan Rowecki "Grot," posthumously awarded Aleksy Dawidowski the Virtuti Militari Cross, Class V, for his heroic conduct against the enemy and death at his post. "Alek" was the first scout from the Grey Ranks to receive this highest Polish military decoration. By the same order, "Grot" awarded Tadeusz Krzyżewicz, Tadeusz Zawadzki, Jan Rodowicz, Jerzy Gawin, Sławomir Bittner, and Eugeniusz Koecher the Cross of Valor.

In retaliation for the Arsenal action, on March 27, 1943, 140 prisoners – Poles and Jews – were shot in the courtyard of Pawiak.

== Commemoration ==
The events were described in Aleksander Kamiński's book (in the first two occupation editions under the pseudonym Juliusz Górecki) "Stones for the Rampart". The Operation was presented in a 1978 Polish film Akcja pod Arsenałem and in a 2014 Polish film Stones for the Rampart based on Aleksander Kamiński's novel of the same name.

== Details ==
Sections	Commander	Members
Commander of the operation: Commander of the "Attack Group": Commander of the "Cover Group":	"Orsza" Stanisław Broniewski "Zośka" Tadeusz Zawadzki "Giewont" Władysław Cieplak
Attack Group
"Bottles"	"Anoda" Jan Rodowicz	"Bolec" Tadeusz Chojko "Heniek" Henryk Kupis "Stasiek" Stanisław Pomykalski
"STEN I"	"Maciek" Sławomir Maciej Bittner	"Kołczan" Eugeniusz Koecher "Sem" Wiesław Krajewski
"STEN II"	"Słoń" Jerzy Gawin	"Buzdygan" Tadeusz Krzyżewicz (died, due to wounds) "Cielak" Tadeusz Szajnoch
"Grenades"	"Alek" Maciej Aleksy Dawidowski (died, due to wounds)	"Hubert" Hubert Lenk "Mirski" Jerzy Zapadko
Cover Group
"Signalisation"	"Kuba" Konrad Okolski	"Kadłubek" Witold Bartnicki "Jur" Andrzej Wolski
"Old Town"	"Katoda" Józef Saski	"Kopeć" Stanisław Jastrzębski "Rawicz" Żelisław Olech
"Ghetto"	"Tytus" Tytus Trzciński	"Felek" Feliks Pendelski "Ziutek" Józef Pleszczyński "Pająk" Jerzy Tabor
"Cars"	"Jeremi" Jerzy Zborowski "Jurek TK" Jerzy Pepłowski

== See also ==
- German occupation of Poland
- Warsaw Uprising
