= Operation Belt =

Operation Belt (Polish: Akcja Taśma) was one of the large-scale anti-Nazi Germany operations of the Armia Krajowa Kedyw during World War II.

In August 1943, the headquarters of the Armia Krajowa ordered Kedyw to prepare an armed action against German border guarding stations on the frontier between the General Government and the territories annexed by the Third Reich. By February 1944, 13 German outposts were destroyed with few losses on the Polish side. One of the Poles who died in the operation was the Boy Scout Tadeusz Zawadzki, one of the most important personalities of the Polish underground. Zawadzki was killed on 20 August 1943, during an attack on a German border station at the village of Sieczychy, near Wyszków.

Operation Belt itself took place on the night of 20–21 August, when seven German stations were destroyed. On 30 August, General Tadeusz Bór-Komorowski ordered to begin preparation of another armed action, Operation Chain (Akcja Lancuch), which was the continuation of Belt.

During Chain, which took place in late November 1943, units of the Home Army carried out several similar attacks on German border stations in southern part of occupied Poland. In the autumn of 1943, the Home Army of the Kraków District attacked several German outposts along the border with Slovakia – among others, at Barwinek, Piwniczna, and in the area of Nowy Targ and Wadowice.
