= Aleksander Kamiński =

Polish writer and scout leader (1903–1978)

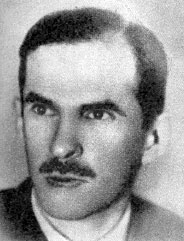
- Kamiński, nom de guerre "Kamyk"
- Born: 28 January 1903; Warsaw, Congress Poland, Russian Empire
- Died: 15 March 1978 (aged 75); Warsaw, Poland
- Occupations: Writer, historian, school teacher, form tutor

Aleksander Kamiński (Polish: [kaˈmiɲ.ski]), assumed name: Aleksander Kędzierski; also known under aliases such as Dąbrowski, J. Dąbrowski, Fabrykant, Faktor, Juliusz Górecki, Hubert, Kamyk, Kaźmierczak, Bambaju (28 January 1903 – 15 March 1978) was a Polish educator, writer, co-founder of Cub Scouts methodology, and soldier of the Home Army. He was one of the ideological leaders of the Grey Ranks and chairman of the Presidium of the Supreme Council of the Polish Scouting Association.

As a writer, he is most well-known for his 1943 novel Stones for the Rampart, a wartime story set in occupied Warsaw that portrays the real experiences of Polish Scout resistance fighters during World War II.

== Biography ==
=== Childhood and youth ===
Kamiński was born in Warsaw to pharmacist Jan Kamiński and Petronela Kaźmierczak. In 1905, the family moved to Kiev, where he graduated from the Russian 4th grade general school. In 1914, he moved to Rostov and in 1916 to Uman.

Hard financial conditions after his father died in 1911 forced him to work as a bank messenger since around 1916. In January 1918, he became a member of the 1st Men's Scouting Team "Tadeusz Kościuszko" in Uman. He held ranks of patrol leader, adjutant, team captain and troop adjutant since summer of 1919, and was captain of the Uman Nest since May 1920 (which included male and female scouts).

Since 1918 student of the Polish high school in Uman.

After returning to Poland in March 1921, he continued his education at the Kazimierz Kulwieć Middle School in Warsaw, where he received his maturity diploma in June 1922. Kamiński then studied history at the Faculty of Philosophy of the University of Warsaw and received his master's degree in January 1928. During his studies, he continued to work on a regular basis: from 1922, he was an assistant to the teacher, a teacher, and later head of the boarding house of the Central Welfare Council in Pruszków. From 1929 he worked as a history teacher at Saint Stanislaw Kostka Gymnasium in Warsaw, and from 1930 to 1931 he was the head of the boarding house of the Union of Military Settlers for the youth of vocational schools at Młocińska Street. Kamiński co-founded and then became a member of the governing bodies of the Educational Trade Union.

=== Inter-war period ===
Kamiński continued his activity in the Polish Scouting and Guiding Association during the interwar period. On 3 October 1922, the Commander-in-Chief appointed him leader with service from August 1921, and on 30 June 1924, he was appointed the rank of a petty scoutmaster. After changing the names of the scouting ranks (in December 1927) – a scoutmaster. From 1923, Kamiński was a team captain of the First Pruszkow Scouting Team "Stefan Czarniecki" (founded by Kamiński himself; in 1930 the Banner's command changed its name and number to 14th Masovian Scouting Team "Stefan Czarniecki";this is related to the unification of the numbering and names of the teams) and the 3rd Pruszków Scouting Team "Tomasz Zan". He also served as Deputy troupe leader. Kamiński kept a permanent column entitled "Scouting life" in the magazine "Echo Pruszkowskie".

In the years 1925–1927 commander of the Pruszków Troup, and from autumn 1928 to December 1929 commander of the Masovian Banner. At the same time, from September 1928 to June 1929, team captain of the 6th Warsaw Scouting Team "Jan Henryk Dąbrowski".Since 1931, head of the Minority Teams Department in the Headquarters of the Scouts. He was also the head of the Central Committee of the Union of Jewish Scouting Teams and Cubs. Creator of the cubs methodology (in cooperation with Jadwiga Zwolakowska). Author of novels, which were also methodological manuals for instructors of the ZHP Scouts: "Antek Cwaniak" (1932), "Książka wodza zuchów" (1933) and "Koło rady" (1935).

He was head of the Faculty of Cubs at the Headquarters of the Scouts until September 1937 (with a break from April to September 1933). Since September 1933 commander of the School of Cubs Instructors in Nierodzim, Cieszyn Silesia, and since May 1937 until the outbreak of the war head of the Scouting Centre in nearby Górki Wielkie near Skoczów (the School of Cubs Instructors was incorporated into the centre). Head of the Department of Senior Scouts Education in the Headquarters of the Polish Scouting Association.

In July 1934 Kamiński conducted an international cubs training course in Brenna (Beskid Śląski), later, in July 1938, headed a Polish delegation to an international conference of cubs instructors in Gilwell, Great Britain. He participated in Jamboree in Great Britain in 1929, Hungary in 1933 and the Netherlands in 1937, and in the International Cubs Conference in July 1939 in Edinburgh (the next such conference was to be held in Poland).

=== World War II ===
After the outbreak of the war, evacuated in September 1939 from Silesia, he arrived in Warsaw around 12 September and joined the Scouting Rescue Headquarters. After the surrender of the capital he managed a temporary orphanage for children orphaned during the siege of Warsaw.

In conspiracy since October 1939, he was a member of the strict Headquarters ("Pasieka") of the Grey Ranks. Since that month Kamiński was also active in the Service for Poland's Victory. He became the initiator, organizer and then editor-in-chief of the "Information Bulletin" (issued weekly since 5 November 1939 by the Warsaw-City District SZP-ZWZ-AK, and since spring of 1941 by the Home Army Headquarters, the most important conspiratorial newspaper in occupied Poland – circulation up to 47 thousand). During his work in the paper he used his alias "Kaźmierczak", and since November 1942 "Hubert", as well as "Fabrykant" and "Kamyk". He was also the author of most of the introductory articles in the "Information Bulletin".

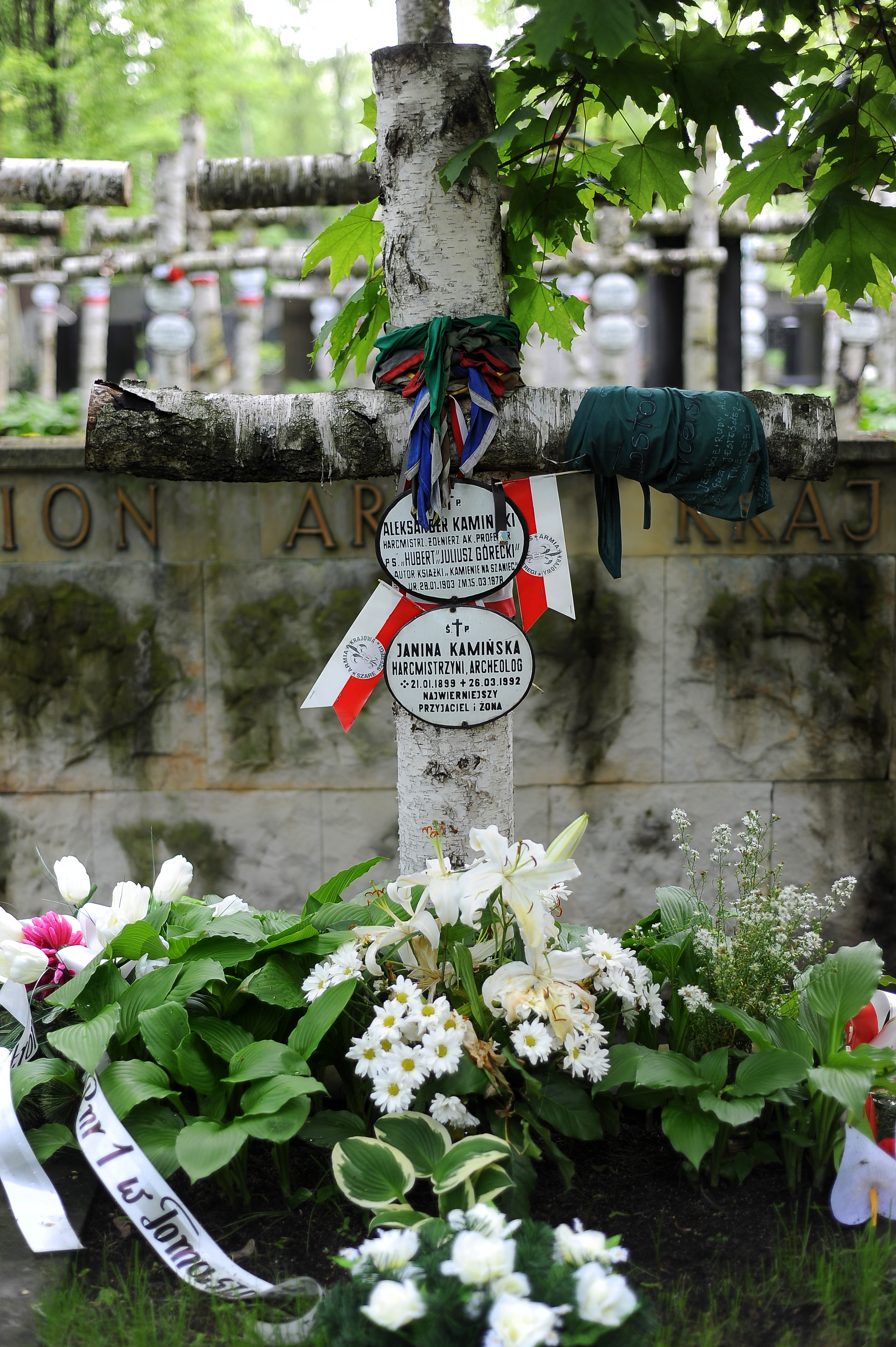
Cross on the grave of Aleksander Kamiński at the Powązki Military Cemetery in Warsaw

In "Przeglad Propagandowy" (1943 No. 2), under the alias "Hubert", Kamiński published an article "Podstawy ideowe propagandy wojskowej" (The Ideological Basics of Military Propaganda).

At the same time, in April 1941 Kamiński succeeded Captain Zygmunt Hempel in leading the BiP Division of the Warsaw-City District of ZWZ – Warsaw District of the Home Army under the alias "Faktor", and from November 1942 – "Fabrykant". Among other things, a cell called "Sztuka" (Art) was created, which initiated works of art, which were distributed or exhibited during the occupation (puppet theatre, caricatures, songs). He organized and then supervised the work of the Propaganda Commission (KOPR), which since spring of 1942 had been producing the entire publishing output of the Home Army Warsaw District Headquarters. He remained the head of BiP of the Warsaw Home Army District Headquarters until June 1944.

At the same time, from 1941 until the outbreak of the Warsaw Uprising, under the alias "Hubert", Kamiński was a counterintelligence officer in the unit II of the Main Headquarters of ZWZ-AK.

Creator of the concept, founder and since December 1940 commander-in-chief of the Small Sabotage Organization "Wawer" under the pseudonym "Dąbrowski". At that time, he wrote an article titled "Little Sabotage" (Information Bulletin, 1 September 1940). The best known and most visible effects of Wawer's activity include drawings of the "anchor" of the Fighting Poland and "V" signs, as well as anti-German inscriptions in public places, distribution of leaflets, gassing of cinemas and megaphone actions. Kamiński personally participated in the first series of such actions – destruction of exhibitions of photographers showing photographs of uniformed Germans (5 December 1940).

Kamiński is the author of one of the most famous books of occupied Warsaw, Kamienie na szaniec (Stones for the Rampart), which was first published in July 1943. He wrote the book on the basis of Tadeusz "Zośka" Zawadzki's account of his colleagues from the 23rd Warsaw Scouting Team, including Jan Bytnar and Aleksy Dawidowski, written after the Operation Arsenal in April 1943.

He was the author of The Great Game, the first edition of which was destroyed in 1942 by order of the Home Army Main Command as it was revealing the methods of underground combat. The second edition was not distributed due to the outbreak of the Warsaw Uprising, the third edition was released in Warsaw in 1981. He also wrote "Przodownik. Podręcznik dla kierowników oddziałów Zawiszy" ("The Leader. Manual for Branch Managers of Zawisza") (part 1–2, December 1942, edition II 1943, edition III 1944).

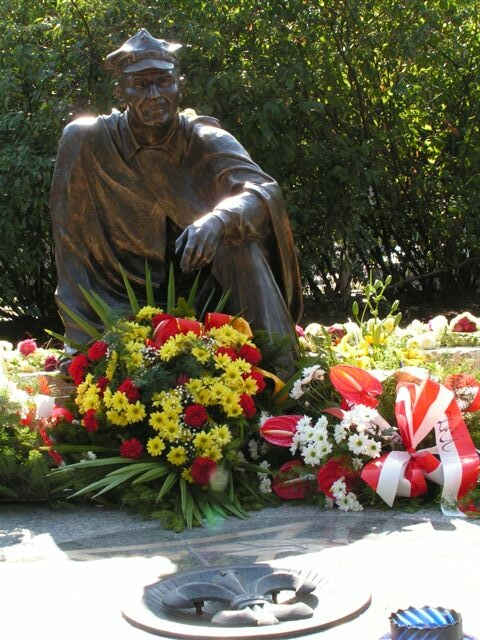
Kamiński memorial in Łódź

In April 1944, Kamiński was placed by the counterintelligence of the National Armed Forces (NSZ) on one of the so-called proscription lists, which included the names of people suspected of being leftist, Communist and/or Jewish in origin. In the NSZ document Aleksander Kamiński was described as "a Jew-lover who always inclined towards the extreme left-communist".

During the Warsaw Uprising he continued to be the editor-in-chief of the "Information Bulletin", which at that time was already published openly as a daily newspaper, until the last issue on 4 October 1944.

On 30 September 1944 the head of the Home Army Headquarters, Colonel Jan Rzepecki, alias Chairman, applied for Kamiński's promotion to the rank of Second Lieutenant of the Polish Army (WP) Reserve. After the capitulation of the Warsaw Uprising, he was no longer involved in any underground activity.

=== Post-war period ===
From May 1945 to 1950 Kamiński was an assistant at the faculties of social pedagogy and general pedagogy of the University of Łódź. In 1947 he received his PhD degree in philosophy after defending his dissertation "The Scouting method in upbringing and schooling".

Still active in the ZHP: from January 1946 he was a member of the Ideological Commission and the Law and Promise of Scouting. By the ordinance of 12 January 1946, Kamiński was appointed a member of the Provisional General Scouting Council, and from March 1946, he was the Second Vice President of the Polish Scouting Association. In 1947 he was deprived of this position, and in January 1949 removed from the ZHP for ideological reasons. At the beginning of 1950, Kamiński was also removed from the University of Łódź. In 1951, all his works were withdrawn from Polish libraries and censored. Until 1956, under surveillance of the Security Office.

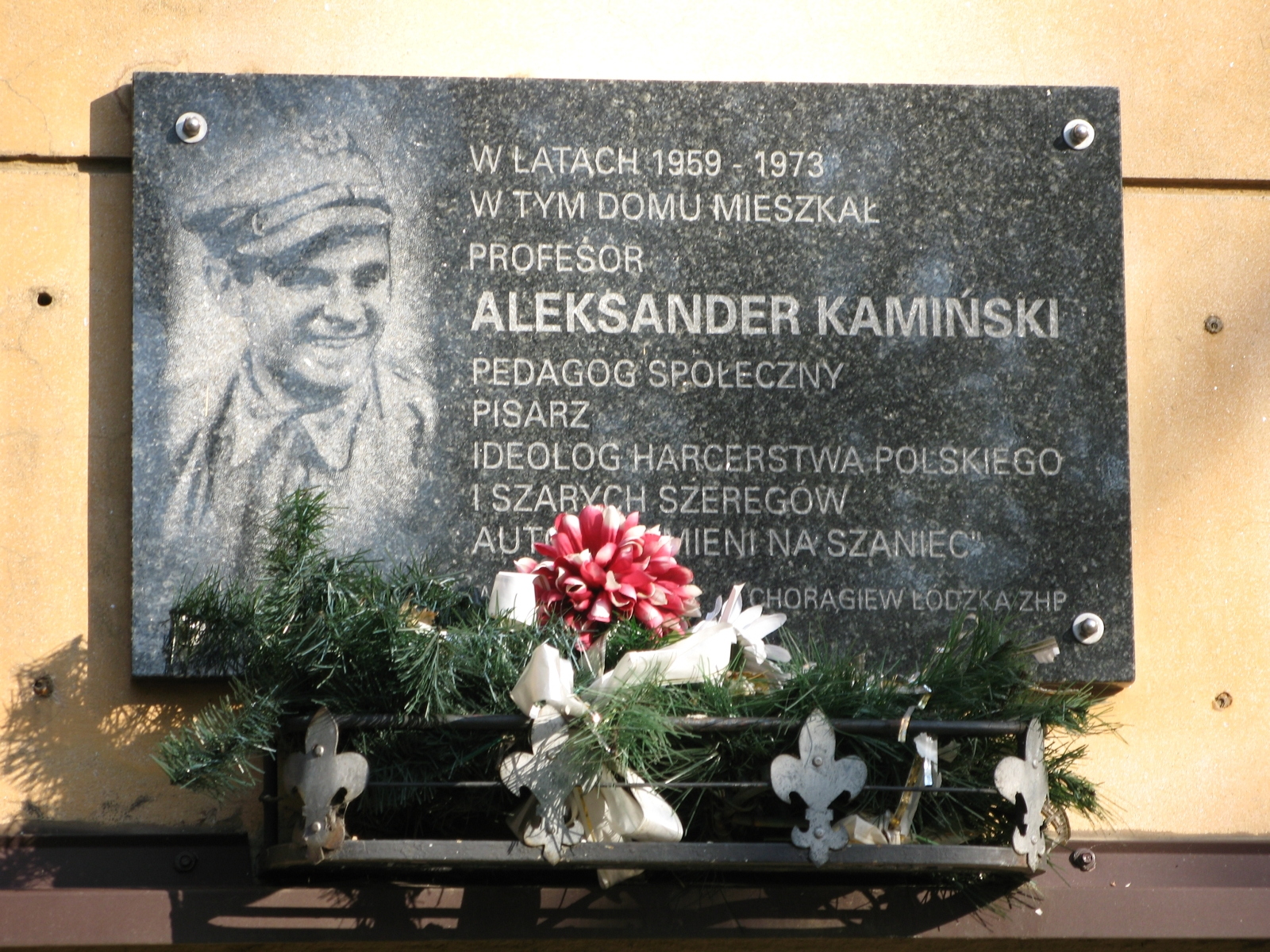
A plaque on the building at Aleksander Kamiński Street 30 in Łódź

Kamiński returned to scouting in 1956, when the events of October 1956 brought renewal and hope for democratic change in the country. Kaminski participated in discussions on the situation in the scouting sector and the possibility of reactivating ZHP. On 26 November 1956, he met with a group of instructors representing the Kraków community, who were in the process of finalizing the reactivation of ZHP. They refused to support him in the implementation of his concept of reactivating scouting activities within the OHPL (Scouting Organization of the People's Republic of Poland), presenting their position (and evidence) that the only correct solution was to reactivate the ZHP (which they did on 4 December 1956). At that time, at the beginning of December, he held meetings with 25 instructors from the pre-war ZHP. Kamiński went with them to the meeting of OHPL activists in Łódź, which was transformed into the "All-Poland Meeting of Scouting Activists" (National Congress of Scouting Activists). He became a member of the Supreme Scouting Council and was later elected Chairman.

However, Kamiński held the position of the Chairman of the council for less than a year and a half. He resigned under pressure from the forces that sought to subjugate ZHP ideologically to the Polish United Workers' Party.

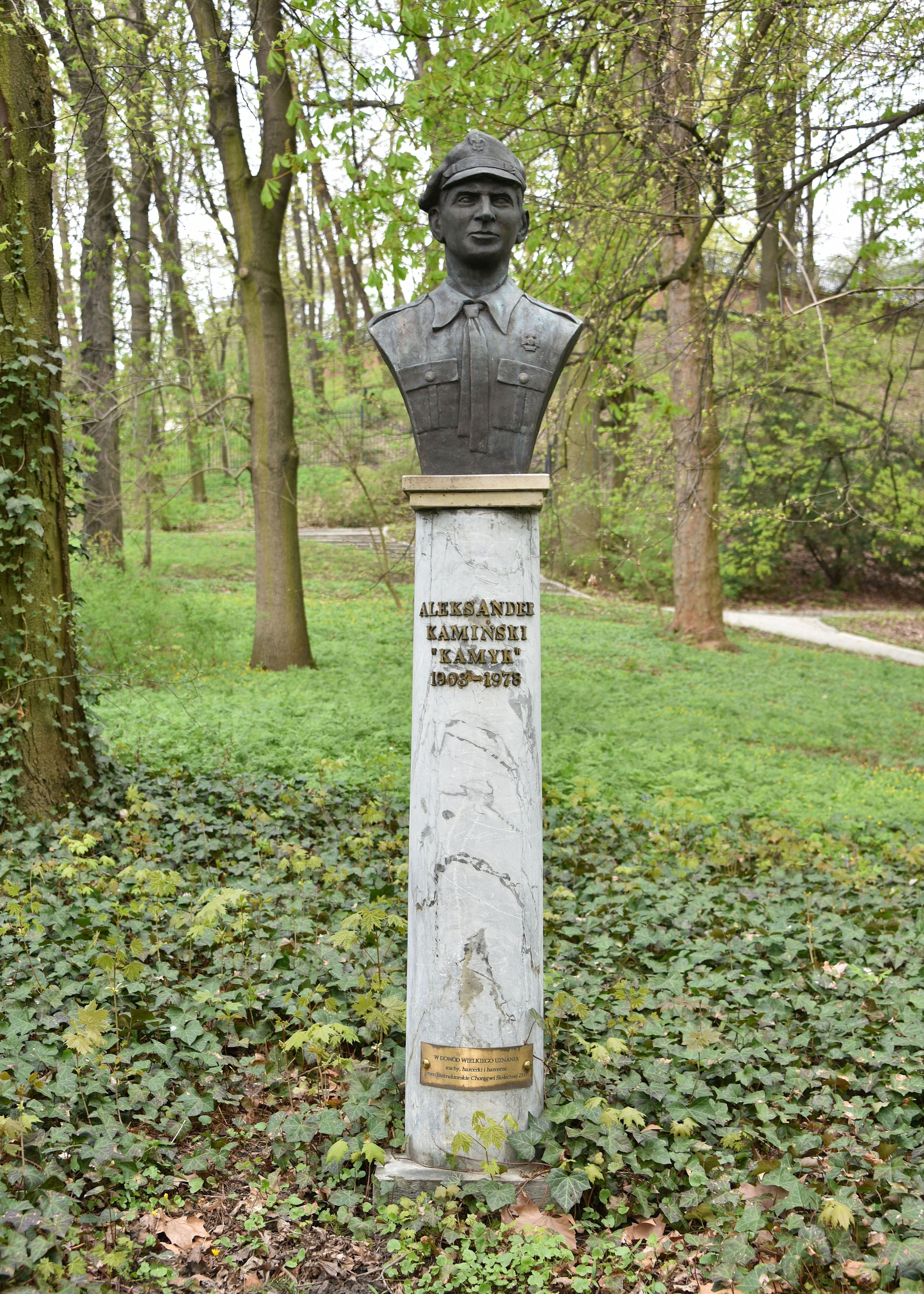
Bust of Aleksander Kamiński in the Royal Baths in Warsaw

In 1958, Kamiński returned to work at the University of Łódź, where he headed the Department of Social Pedagogy. In 1958, he was a member of the National Committee of the Front of National Unity.

In 1959 he obtained his postdoctoral degree on the basis of his work "Prehistory of Polish Youth Associations", and in March 1969 he was awarded the title of Associate Professor.

Kamiński was active in the Polish Teachers Association and in the Polish Mental Hygiene Association. He was a member of the Committee of Pedagogical and Psychological Sciences of the Polish Academy of Sciences. At the beginning of the 1970s, on the order of the authorities, Kamiński prepared a report on the consequences of possible introduction of work-free Saturdays.

After retiring in 1972, he returned to Warsaw, where he died on 15 March 1978 and was buried at the Powązki Military Cemetery, Warsaw, in the quarters of the Home Army Scouting Battalion "Zoska" (A20-1-13). In the end Kamiński rested next to Rudy, Alek and Zośka, who were so close to him as the heroes of "Stones for the Rampart".

On 5 May 1991, the Yad Vashem Institute posthumously awarded Aleksander Kamiński the title of "Righteous Among the Nations" for his help given during the occupation to members of the Jewish scouts' organization and the Jewish resistance movement.

On 22 February 2008, on the Fraternal Thought Day, during the celebrations connected with the honorary patronage of 5 scouting organizations, the President of the Republic of Poland Lech Kaczyński posthumously awarded Aleksander Kamiński the Commander's Cross of the Order of Polonia Restituta.

Kamiński was the husband of Janina Kamińska's, a Polish archaeologist, educator and instructor of the Polish Scouting Association, and the father of Ewa Rzetelska-Feleszko, a linguistics professor.

== Books ==
- Kamienie na szaniec (1943); published in English as Stones for the Rampart (London, 1945), with a foreword by P. H. B. Lyon
- Wielka Gra (1942, 1981)
- Przodownik. Podręcznik dla kierowników oddziałów Zawiszy (cz. 1–2, December 1942, II 1943, III 1944)
- Zośka i Parasol. Opowieść o niektórych ludziach i niektórych akcjach dwóch batalionów harcerskich
- Józef Grzesiak "Czarny"

Interwar period

- Antek Cwaniak (1932)
- Książka wodza zuchów (1933)
- Krąg rady (1935)
- Narodziny dzielności
- Andrzej Małkowski (1934)

== Awards and decorations ==
- Commander's Cross of the Order of Polonia Restituta (21 February 2008, posthumously)
- Knight's Cross of the Order of Polonia Restituta
- Cross of Valour
- Golden Cross of Merit with Swords (25 July 1944)
- Silver Cross of Merit
- Silver Cross of Merit for ZHP (1992, posthumously)
- The Righteous Among the Nations Medal (1991, posthumously)

== Honors ==
By resolution of 9 January 2003, the Sejm of the Republic of Poland decided to designate the year 2003 as the Year of Aleksander Kamiński.

On 24 September 2005, the first monument in Poland to Aleksander Kamiński was unveiled in the Old Town Park in Łódź. Also in Łódź, on the wall of the house at No. 30, on the street bearing the name of Aleksander Kamiński, is a plaque commemorating his place of residence in the city. His bust is also located in the Royal Baths in Warsaw.

In 2014, Kamiński was a patron of the Łódź ZHP Banner, the Youth Palace in Katowice, 15 schools and 27 strains, teams and scout troops.
