= Stones for the Rampart =

1943 novel by Aleksander Kamiński

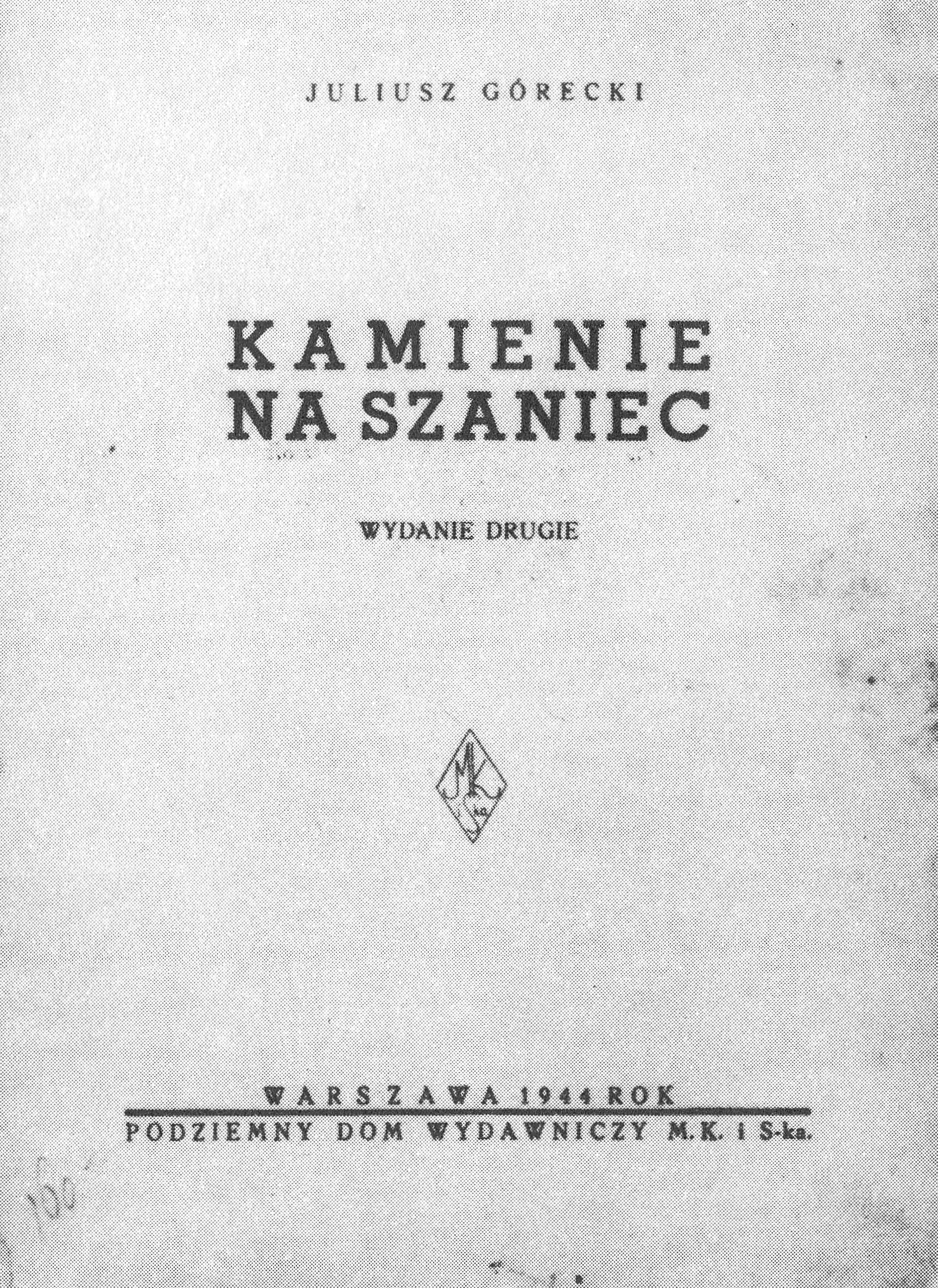
- Title page of the 2nd edition of the book, 1944
- Author: Aleksander Kamiński
- Original title: Kamienie na szaniec
- Language: Polish
- Subject: Small sabotage, Gray Ranks
- Genre: Drama, war, non-fiction
- Publisher: Polish underground press
- Publication date: July 1943
- Publication place: Poland

Kamienie na szaniec (lit. Stones for the Rampart, also translated as Stones on the Barricade) is a 1943 non-fiction novel by Polish writer Aleksander Kamiński. Published by the Polish underground press during the World War II occupation of Poland, the book describes the history of the Polish underground scout movement, the Grey Ranks (and the affiliation, in particular with the Polish Underground State and Home Army, of whom Kamiński was one of the instructors and leaders), from his experiences and several members in particular, from the time before through the occupation until the publication.

Already immensely popular during World War II, after the war the book entered the canon of Polish literature and remains a recommended reading text for Polish students in the secondary school curriculum. It was adapted into two feature films, in 1977 and in 2014.

== Origin ==
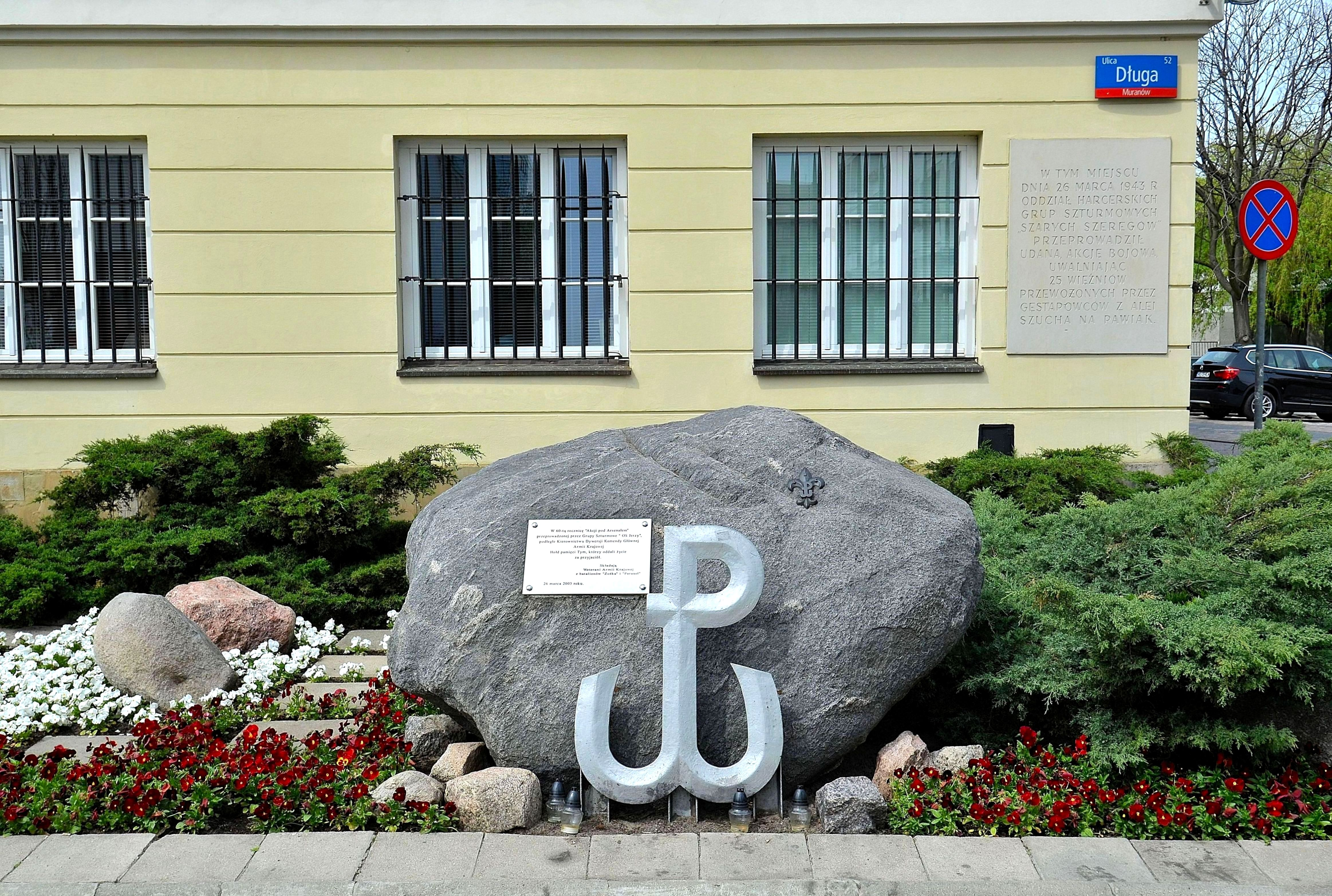
Operation Arsenal memorial and commemorative plaque at 52 Długa Street in Warsaw

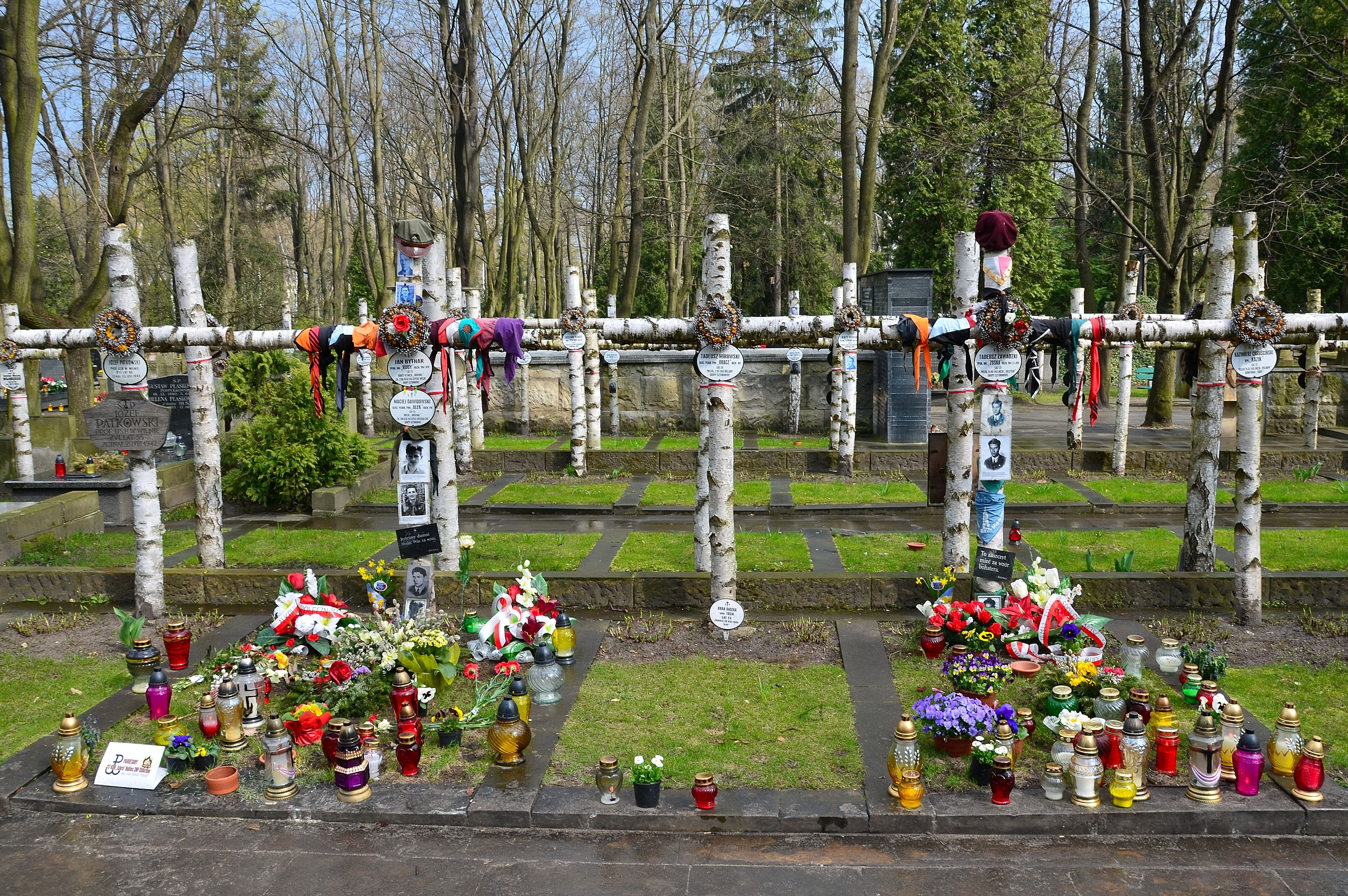
Graves of "Rudy", "Alek" and "Zośka" at Powązki Military Cemetery

Kamienie na szaniec was published by the Polish underground press in 1943, during the period of German occupation of Poland in World War II. The author Aleksander Kamiński was a member of the Polish Armia Krajowa (Home Army) resistance movement, editor of the underground Biuletyn Informacyjny magazine, and one of the instructors and leaders of the Polish underground scout movement, the Grey Ranks, which took an active role in the resistance through various acts of minor resistance known as small sabotage. Kamiński based his story on the memoirs of Tadeusz Zawadzki ("Zośka"), a 22-year-old member of the Grey Ranks.

== Plot ==
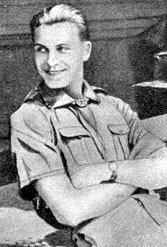
"Alek"

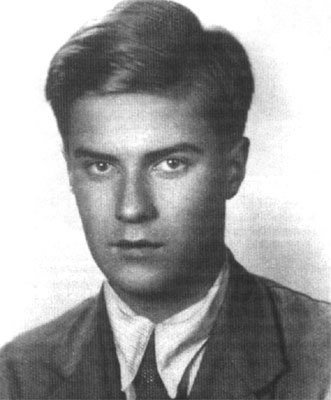
"Zośka"

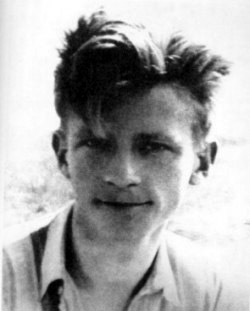
"Rudy"

The story portrayed in the book is a slightly fictionalized account of real lives of Gray Rank members (known by their noms-de-guerre of "Rudy", "Zośka", and "Alek"), with the final act centred on the Operation Arsenal. The book tells the story of a group of Polish boy-scouts taking part in resistance movements in nazi-occupied Warsaw. A major part of the book revolves around trying to rescue "Rudy" from Gestapo captivity. Despite the success of the operation, "Rudy" dies shortly afterwards from grave injuries caused by torture during German interrogations, with "Zośka" by his side. "Alek" dies at the same time from wounds sustained during the rescue, while "Zośka" is killed a few months later in another operation.

== Significance ==
The title of the book comes from Testament mój (My Testament), a poem by Juliusz Słowacki, and refers to the insurrectionist traditions of Polish romanticism. In that book, Kamiński redefines the meaning of scouting in times of military conflict. According to the critic Maciej Górny, describing the book's role in the complexity of subsequent events of Polish history, it became "one of the main Polish narratives of the Second World War, appealing to sentiments of national heroism as well as contributing to symbolic self-victimization."

The relevant passage from Słowacki's poem is:

But I beseech you – there is hope while there is breath.

Do lead the nation with a wisdom’s torch held high,
And one by one, if needed be, go straight to death,

As God-hurled stones that densely over ramparts fly.

== Publication ==
Kamienie na szaniec was published in Poland twice before the war ended, and 17 times before 1993. The book was published in English as Stones for the Rampart: The story of two lads in the Polish underground movement in 1944, and in Czech in 1948.

== Reception ==
Despite difficulties in distribution, it quickly gained popularity in occupied Poland. Over the years the book, described as "canonical", became a recommended reading text for Polish students in the secondary school curriculum. At first, however, the book's popularity had been of concern to the Polish communist authorities after the war, due to their ambivalent or even hostile attitude towards the Home Army tradition. In the first years of communist rule, it was either criticized as irresponsible, or suppressed. It was republished following the liberalization of 1956, and eventually it was included in the recommended texts for schoolchildren even before the fall of communism in Poland.

== Film adaptations ==
The book was made into a movie, Akcja pod Arsenałem, directed by Jan Łomnicki in 1977.

A new film based on the book, directed by Robert Gliński, was released in Poland on March 7, 2014. It was promoted by the song "4:30" by Polish singer Dawid Podsiadło.

== See also ==
- Polish Underground State
