= Cross of Merit (Polish Scouting and Guiding Association) =

- Silver Cross
- Owner: Polish Scouting and Guiding Association
- Country: Poland

The Krzyż za Zasługi dla ZHP ("Cross of Merit for the ZHP") is the highest decoration of the Polish Scouting and Guiding Association (ZHP). The order is awarded to members of the ZHP for heroic acts. It was established on 1 July 1965. The Order has three classes:

1. Golden Cross of Merit
2. Silver Cross of Merit
3. Bronze Cross of Merit

== See also ==
- Krzyż Harcerski
