= Jan Bytnar =

Polish anti-Nazi resistance fighter (1921–1943)

Jan Bytnar "Rudy", "Czarny", "Janek", "Krokodyl", "Jan Rudy"
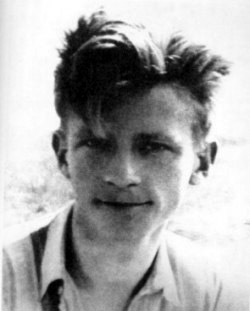
- Born: 6 May 1921; Kolbuszowa, Poland
- Died: 30 March 1943 (aged 21); Warsaw, Poland
- Military career
- Allegiance: Poland
- Branch: Armia Krajowa (Home Army)
- Rank: Corporal
- Conflicts: World War II
- Awards: Krzyż Walecznych (Cross of Valour) Commander's Cross of the Order of Polonia Restituta

Jan Roman Bytnar, nom de guerre "Rudy" (Ginger) (born 6 May 1921, Kolbuszowa, Poland – died 30 March 1943, Warsaw, Poland) was a Polish scoutmaster, a member of Polish scouting anti-Nazi resistance, and a lieutenant in the Home Army during the Second World War.

== Biography ==
He was the son of Stanisław Bytnar, a teacher and soldier in the Polish Legions in World War I, and Zdzisława Rechulówna. He attended elementary school in Piastów. In 1931 he was accepted to the Stefan Batory Gymnasium in Warsaw, where the Bytnar family moved in the same year. They lived in the Mokotów district.

In 1934, at the age of 13, he joined the Polish Scouting and Guiding Association. In 1938 he attained the highest non-instructor rank, "Scout of the Republic". Shortly before, in 1937, he began attending a lyceum; he graduated in May 1939.

== World War II ==
After the German invasion of Poland in September 1939, Bytnar lived in occupied Warsaw and worked as a glazier and school tutor. In October 1939, together with a group of friends, he joined the short lived left wing Polish People's Independent Action (Polska Ludowa Akcja Niepodległościowa, PLAN), a resistance group. As its member he composed and distributed pamphlets in response to the formation of the General Government by the Nazis. However, the organization was soon infiltrated by the Gestapo and broken up by January 1940. Bytnar left Warsaw and lived with his grandparents in Kolbuszowa in south-eastern Poland, where he also became involved in anti-Nazi resistance. Sometime early in 1940 he joined the Union of Armed Struggle, a precursor organization of the Home Army. In March 1941 he became a member of the Gray Ranks, a paramilitary underground scouting organization which carried out sabotage and diversion against the Germans. In particular, Bytnar and his cell focused on so-called "small sabotage" as part of the Wawer Group.

=== Arrest, death, and reprisal ===
He was arrested by the Nazis on 23 March 1943 and rescued three days later by a combat group of the Gray Ranks during the Operation Arsenal on 26 March. He died on 30 March, at the age of 21, from injuries sustained during the interrogation carried out by the Gestapo while in captivity.

The extremely brutal torture of Bytnar was conducted by SS Rottenführer Ewald Lange and SS Obersturmführer Herbert Schultz. Both were later assassinated by the Gray Ranks. Schultz was shot dead on 6 May 1943 by Sławomir Maciej Bittner (aka "Maciek") and Eugeniusz Kecher (aka "Kołczan"). Lange was shot dead on 22 May 1943 by Jerzy Zapadko (aka "Dzik").

On 4 April 1946, his close friend and fellow Szare Szeregi member who died on the same day during the war, Maciej Dawidowski (aka Alek), was buried in a common grave alongside Bytnar at the Powązki Military Cemetery.

== In literature and culture ==
Bytnar is the main character in Stones for the Rampart, considered a classic of Polish literature for teenagers and young adults, by Aleksander Kamiński and Rudy, Alek, Zośka by Barbara Wachowicz.

He is portrayed by Cezary Morawski in Jan Łomnicki's 1977 historical film Akcja pod Arsenałem telling the story behind Operation Arsenal.

In a 2010 documentary film Oni szli Szarymi Szeregami directed by Mariusz Malec, the character of Bytnar is played by Bartłomiej Firlet.

He served as inspiration for Dawid Podsiadło's 2014 single 4:30, the title of which alludes to the time when Bytnar was captured and arrested by Gestapo on 23 March 1943. The song appears in Robert Gliński's 2014 war drama Stones for the Rampart, a film adaptation of Kamiński's book of the same title, in which the role of Bytnar is played by Tomasz Ziętek.

== Remembrance and recognition ==
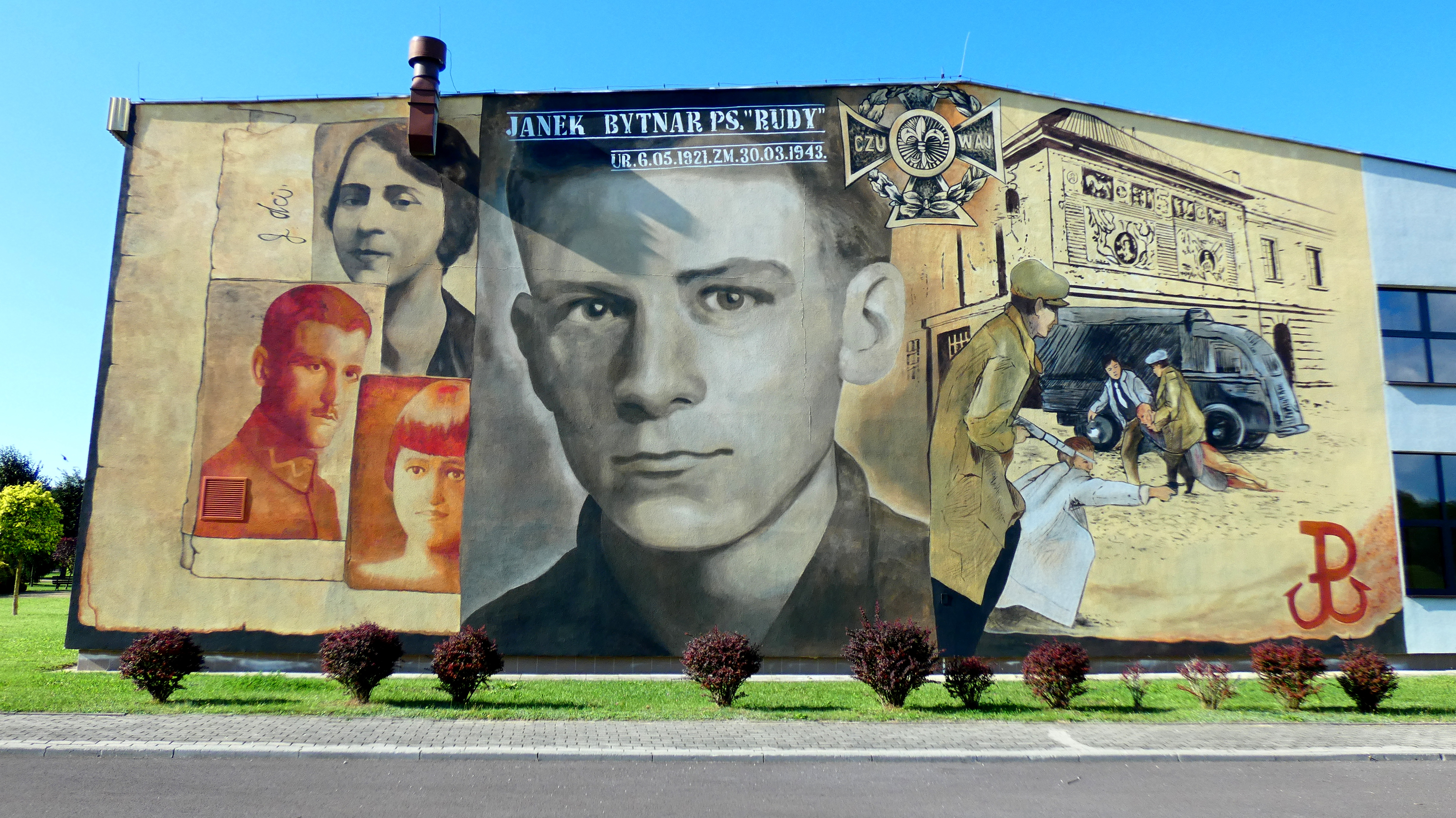
Jan Bytnar depicted on a mural in Kolbuszowa, 2023

In 1943, he was awarded the Cross of Valour for having demonstrated deeds of valour and courage in wartime. In 2009, he was posthumously awarded the Commander's Cross of the Order of Polonia Restituta by the President of Poland.

A commemorative plaque was unveiled on Bytnar's birth house on ul. Nowe Miasto in Kolbuszowa. In 1980, a second plaque was unveiled at the entrance to the tenement house al. Niepodległości 159 in Warsaw where he used to live and where he got arrested.

Streets bearing his name are located in Warsaw, Opole and Kolbuszowa. He is also a patron of 150 Polish scout teams as well as many schools across Poland.

== See also ==
- Polish Secret State
- Związek Harcerstwa Polskiego
- Mury
- Battalion Zośka
- Battalion Parasol
