= Maciej Aleksy Dawidowski =

Polish anti-Nazi resistance fighter

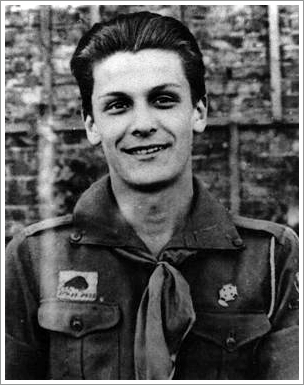
- Nicknames: Alek, Glizda, Kopernicki, Koziorożec
- Born: 3 November 1920; Drohobycz, Lwów Voivodeship, Second Polish Republic
- Died: 30 March 1943 (aged 22) Warschau, General Government
- Allegiance: Poland
- Branch: Armia Krajowa (Home Army)
- Rank: Sergeant (posthumous)
- Conflicts: Polish resistance movement in World War II
- Awards: Virtuti Militari; Polonia Restituta

Maciej Aleksy Dawidowski codenames: Alek, Glizda, Kopernicki, Koziorożec (3 November 1920, in Drohobycz, Second Polish Republic – 30 March 1943, in Warschau, General Government) was a Polish scoutmaster (podharcmistrz), Polish Scouting resistance activist and Second Lieutenant of the Armia Krajowa during the Second World War. Dawidowski is a main character in the books Kamienie na Szaniec by Aleksander Kamiński, and Rudy, Alek, Zośka by Barbara Wachowicz.

== Early life ==
The son of Aleksy Dawidowski, an engineering technologist and Janina Dawidowska (née Sagatowska), who worked in chemical engineering, Dawidowski graduated from the Stefan Batory Warsaw Gymnasium. He was active in the Polish Boy Scout movement. In the fall of 1939 Dawidowski's father was the administrative director of a rifle factory in Warsaw. Following the German occupation of Warsaw in late September 1939, the senior Dawidowski was arrested in November 1939, and in December 1939 the father was shot in the Sejm Gardens.

== Resistance work ==
In 1939 the younger Davidowski was a member of PLAN, in 1940 he became a member of the Grey Ranks (the underground organization of Polish Boy Scouts) and Wawer. He took part in several sabotage actions against the Nazi forces, among others. In the Copernicus action he removed the German language plaques beneath the Warsaw statue of Copernicus on 11 February 1942.

== Participation in Operation Arsenal ==
Jan Bytnar, another resistance leader, was arrested by the Germans on 23 March 1943. The Polish underground army designed a plan to rescue him called Operation Arsenal. Dawidowski participated in the planning and the execution of the operation. During the attack, he was seriously wounded in the stomach by fire from Germans in the gate house where Bytnar was held. Despite this he threw two grenades enabling his comrades to withdraw from the action. He later died in a hospital from his wounds, aged 22.

During the Warsaw Uprising, Dawidowski's code name Alek was later used as the code name for the 2nd Platoon of the 2nd company ("Rudy") of Batalion Zośka. He was posthumously awarded the Silver Cross of the Virtuti Militari and promoted to sergeant. In 2011 he was posthumously awarded the Commander's Cross with Star of the Order of Polonia Restituta.

== Legacy ==
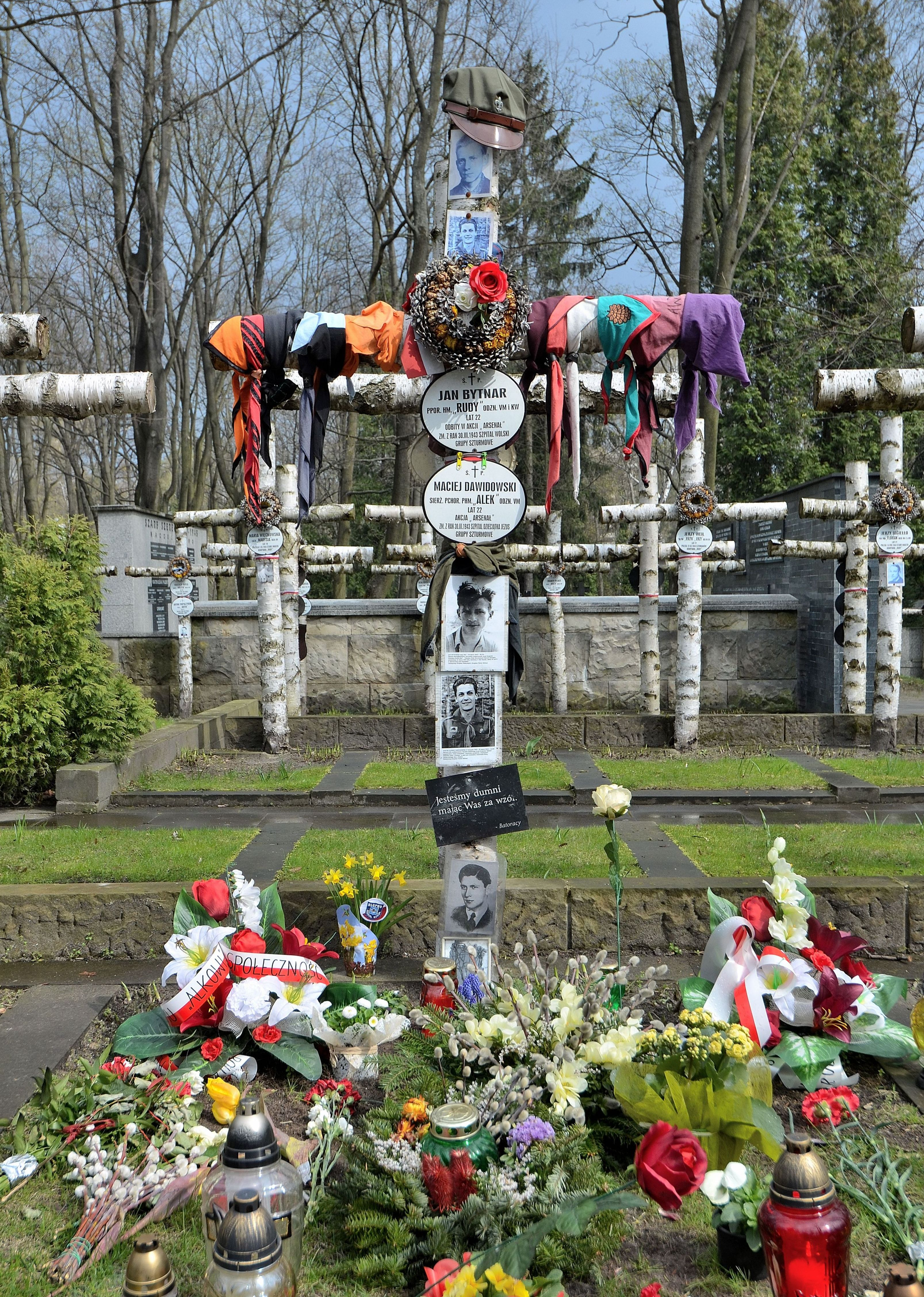
Grave of Dawidowski and Jan Bytnar in Powązki Military Cemetery.

An elementary school, Szkoła Podstawowa nr 391 im. Macieja Aleksego Dawidowskiego, in Warsaw is named in his honour.

An elementary school, Szkoła Podstawowa nr 52 im. Macieja "Alka" Aleksego Dawidowskiego, in Warsaw is named in his honour.
