= Sieczychy =

- Village
- Location within Poland
- Coordinates: 52°42′N 21°29′E
- Country: Poland
- Voivodeship: Masovian
- County: Wyszków
- Gmina: Długosiodło
- Population: 480

Sieczychy [ɕɛˈt͡ʂɨxɨ] is a village in the administrative district of Gmina Długosiodło, within Wyszków County, Masovian Voivodeship, in east-central Poland.
