= Zalesie Dolne =

Neighbourhood of Piaseczno, Poland

- Neighbourhood of Piaseczno
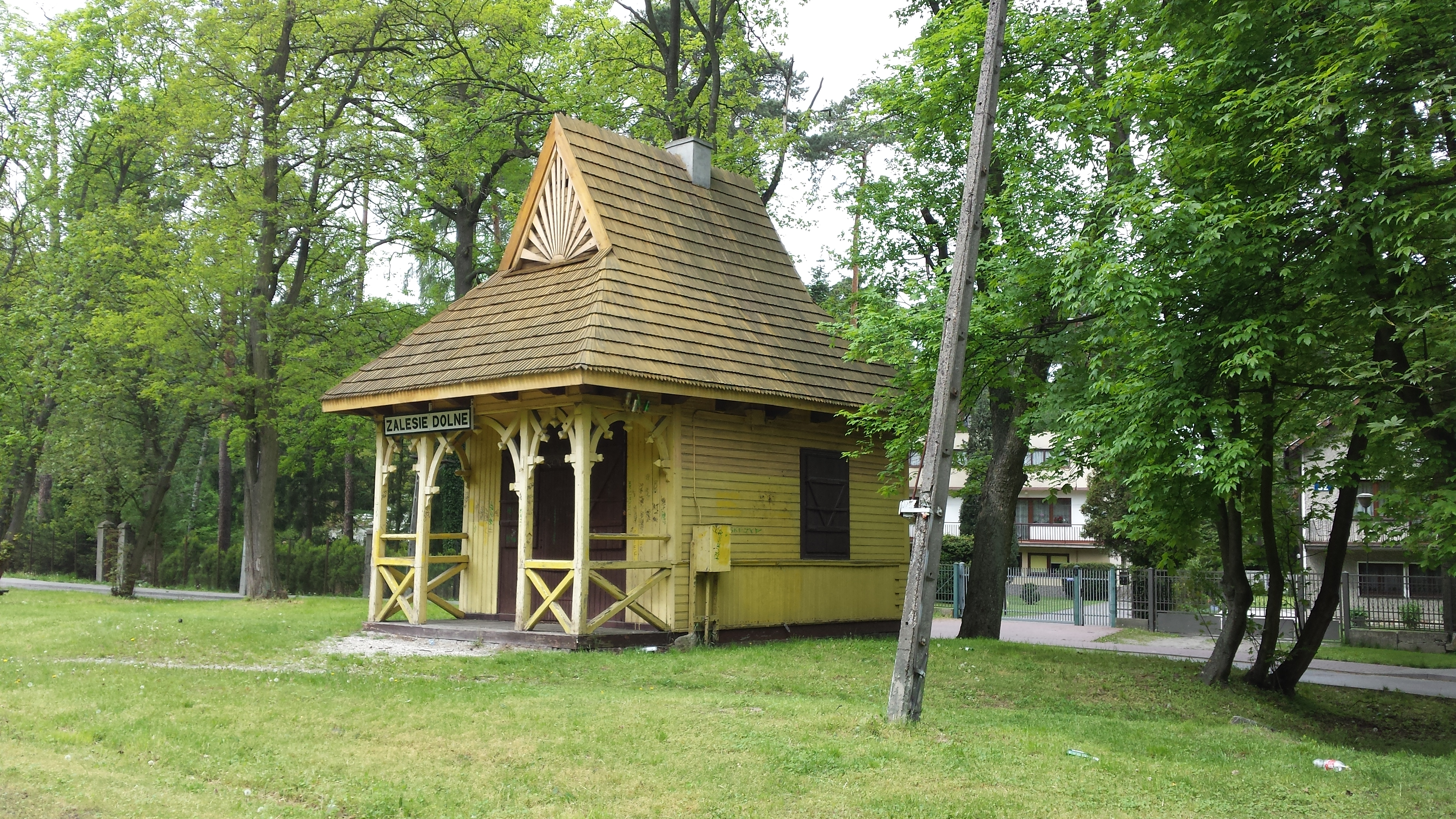

- Location within Poland
- Coordinates: 52°03′12″N 20°59′18″E
- Country: Poland
- Voivodeship: Masovian
- County: Piaseczno
- Gmina: Piaseczno
- Town: Piaseczno
- Within town limits: 1952
- Time zone: UTC+1 (CET)
  - Summer (DST): UTC+2 (CEST)
- Vehicle registration: WPI
- Primary airport: Warsaw Chopin Airport

Zalesie Dolne [zaˈlɛɕɛ ˈdɔlnɛ] is a neighbourhood of Piaseczno, Poland, located in the southern part of the town, in the Warsaw metropolitan area.

== History ==
Zalesie Dolne was established by merging the three settlements of Zalesie Adamowe, Miasto Las Zalesie and Miasto Ogród Zalesie. It was named Zalesie Dolne ("Lower Zalesie") to distinguish it from the nearby village of Zalesie Górne ("Upper Zalesie"). It was developed as a garden city. Writer Maria Dąbrowska and future Primate of Poland Stefan Wyszyński often visited their families there.

Following the joint German-Soviet invasion of Poland, which started World War II in September 1939, Zalesie Dolne was occupied by Germany. The Polish resistance was active, and secret Polish education was organized. Meetings of the Education Department of the Government Delegation for Poland were held in Zalesie Dolne. The Grey Ranks command held meetings at the villa of professor Józef Zawadzki and his son Tadeusz Zawadzki nom de guerre Zośka. In August 1944, the Germans perpetrated a massacre of ten Poles from nearby Orężna in Zalesie Dolne (see Nazi crimes against the Polish nation). Several days later, Polish partisans attacked and shot at the stationed German perpetrators in Zalesie Dolne. The Germans retreated in panic.

It was included within the town limits of Piaseczno as its new neighbourhood in 1952.

== Sights ==
Sights include numerous historic villas, including the house of Tadeusz Zawadzki nom de guerre Zośka, a focal point of the Polish resistance movement in World War II, and the House-Museum of Georgian Officers of the Polish Army (Dom Muzeum Gruzińskich Oficerów Wojska Polskiego).

== Notable people ==
- Józef Zawadzki (1886–1951), physical chemist and technologist
- Witold Doroszewski (1899–1976), lexicographer and linguist
- Anna Zawadzka (1919–2004), teacher, author of textbooks, scoutmaster and member of the Polish resistance movement in World War II
- Tadeusz Zawadzki (1921–1943), scout instructor, scoutmaster and member of the Polish resistance movement in World War II

== Bibliography ==
- Cubała, Agnieszka (2019). Piaseczno '44. Miasto i ludzie (in Polish). Piaseczno. ISBN 978-83-951312-4-0.
