= List of chief scouts of the Polish Scouting and Guiding Association =

Naczelnik ZHP (Chief Scout) is beside the President of the ZHP, the highest function in the Polish Scouting and Guiding Association (ZHP).

== Chief scouts of the Polish Scouting and Guiding Association - since 1918 ==
=== Chief scouts of Boy Scouts 1919-1939 ===
- Stanisław Sedlaczek - 1919-1921,
- Henryk Glass - 1921-1924,
- Adolf Heidrich - 1924-1925,
- Stanisław Sedlaczek - 1925-1931,
- Antoni Olbromski - 1931-1936,
- Tomasz Piskorski - p.o. 1936,
- Zbigniew Trylski - 1937-1939,
- Lechosław Domański - 1939.

=== Chief scouts of Girl Guides 1919-1939 ===
- Maria Wocalewska - 1919-1923,
- Zofia Wocalewska - 1923,
- Helena Sakowiczówna - 1923-1924,
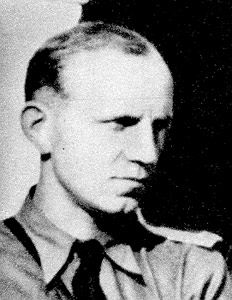
  Florian Marciniak
- Maria Uklejska - 1924-1925,
- Zofia Wilczyńska - 1925-1926,
- Jadwiga Falkowska - 1926-1927,
- Maria Uklejska - 1927-1928,
- Anna Dydyńska-Paszkowska - 1928-1931,
- Jadwiga Wierzbiańska - 1931-1937,
- Maria Krynicka - 1937-1945.

=== Chief scouts of the Szare Szeregi 1939-1945 ===
- hm. Florian Marciniak - September 27, 1939 - May 6, 1943,
- hm. Stanisław Broniewski - May 12, 1943 - October 3, 1944,
- hm. Leon Marszałek - October 3, 1944 - January 18, 1945.

=== Chief scouts of the Polish Scouting and Guiding Association (outside of Poland) - since 1945 ===
among others:

Naczelnik of the Boy Scouts

- hm. Eugeniusz Konopacki 1946 - 1947
- hm. Ryszard Białous 1947 - 1948
- hm. Kazimierz Burmajster 1948 - 1951
- hm. Zbigniew Fallenbüchl 1951 - 1952
- hm. Wojciech Dłużewski 1952 - 1955
- hm. Ryszard Kaczorowski 1955 - 1967
- hm. Jerzy Witting 1967 - 1974
- hm. Jacek Bernasinski 1974 - 1988
- hm. Bogdan Szwagrzak 1988 - 1994
- hm. Edward Jaśnikowski 1994 - 2000
- hm. Edmund Kasprzyk 2000 - 2006
- hm. Andrzej Borowy from 2006 - 2012
- hm. Marek Szablewski 2012 - 2019
- hm. Franek Pepliński 2019–Present

Naczelnik (Naczelniczka) of the Girl Guides

- hm. Teresa Ciecierska - to 2006
- hm. Ania Gebska 2006 -

=== Chief scouts of Boy Scouts 1945-1948 ===
- hm. Michał Sajkowski - December 1944 - May 1945,
- hm. Roman Kierzkowski - May 1945 - 1948.

=== Chief scouts of Girl Guides 1945-1948 ===
- hm. Kazimiera Świętochowska - December 1944 - May 1945,
- hm. Wiktoria Dewitz - May 1945 - 1948.

=== Chief scouts 1956-1964 ===
- hm. Zofia Zakrzewska 1956-1964.

=== Chief scouts of the Polish Scouting and Guiding Association - since 1964 ===
- hm. PL Wiktor Kinecki - 1964-1969,
- hm. PL Stanisław Bohdanowicz - 1969-1974,
- hm. PL Jerzy Wojciechowski - 1974-1980,
- hm. PL Andrzej Ornat - 1980-1982,
- hm. PL Ryszard Wosiński - 1982-1989,
- hm. Krzysztof Grzebyk - 1989-1990,
- hm. Ryszard Pacławski - 1990-2000,
- hm. Wiesław Maślanka - 2000-2005,
- hm. Teresa Hernik - 2005-2007,
- hm. Małgorzata Sinica - 2007-2017,
- hm. Anna Nowosad - 2017-2021
- hm. Grzegorz Woźniak - 2021-2022
- hm. Martyna Kowacka - since 2022

== See also ==
- Scouting Ireland Chief Scout
