= Piaseczno =

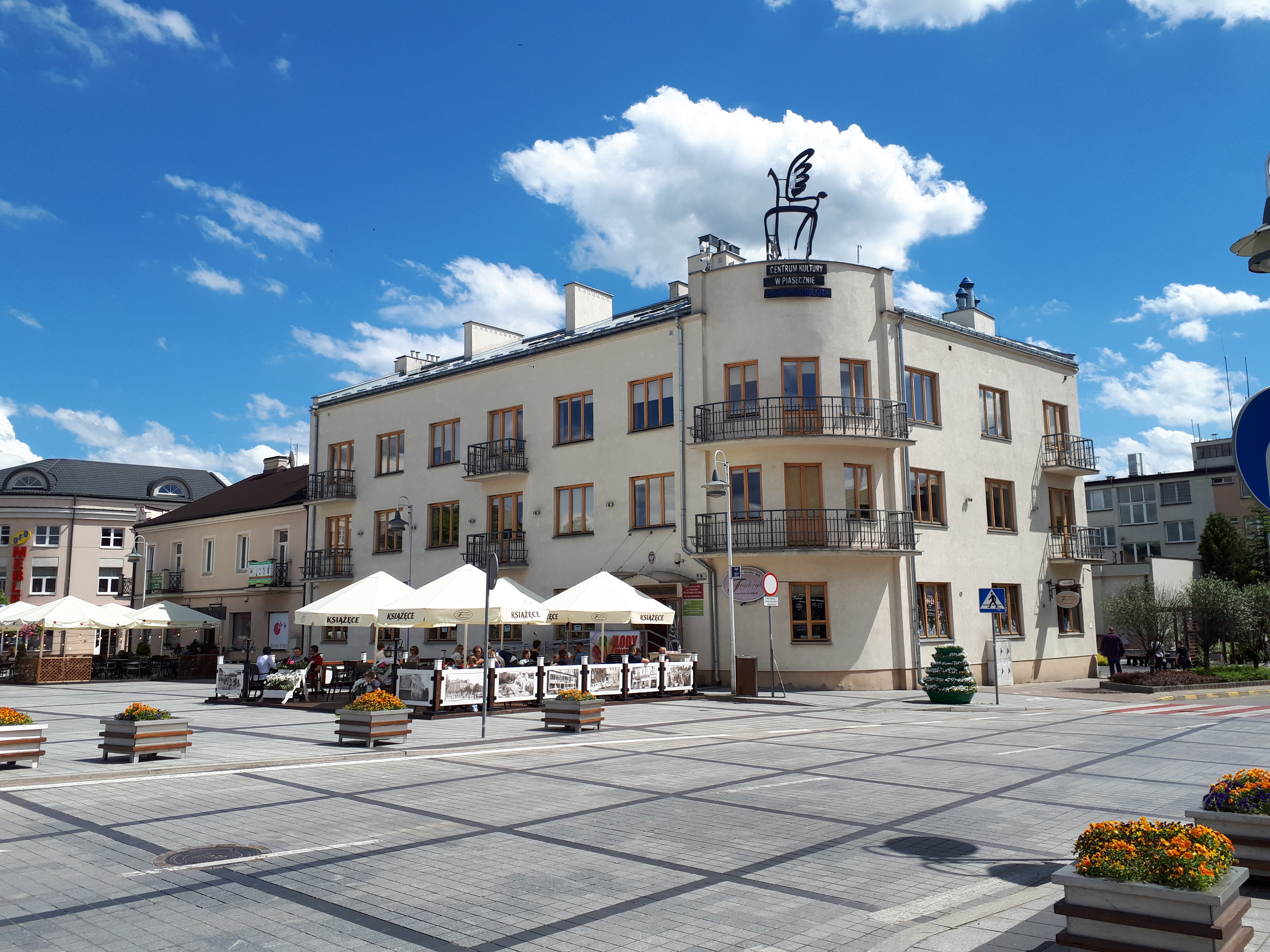
- Plac Józefa Piłsudskiego (Józef Piłsudski Square)

- Flag Coat of arms

- Location within Poland
- Coordinates: 52°4′0″N 21°1′0″E
- Country: Poland
- Voivodeship: Masovian
- County: Piaseczno
- Gmina: Piaseczno
- First mentioned: 13th century
- Town rights: 1429

Government
  - Mayor: Daniel Putkiewicz

Area
  - Total: 16.33 km^{2} (6.31 sq mi)

Population (2017)
  - Total: 47,660
  - Density: 2,919/km^{2} (7,559/sq mi)
- Time zone: UTC+1 (CET)
  - Summer (DST): UTC+2 (CEST)
- Postal code: 05-500
- Area code: +48 22
- Car plates: WPI
- Website: http://www.piaseczno.eu/

Piaseczno ([pʲaˈsɛt͡ʂnɔ]) is a town in east-central Poland with 47,660 inhabitants. It is situated in the Masovian Voivodeship, within the Warsaw metropolitan area, just south of Warsaw, approximately 16 kilometres (10 miles) south of its center. It is a residential area and a suburb of Warsaw. It is the capital city of Piaseczno County.

Founded in the medieval period, Piaseczno is a former royal city of Poland, which once housed a Polish Royal palace. It was the site of several Polish clashes against foreign invaders and occupiers.

== History ==
=== Early history ===
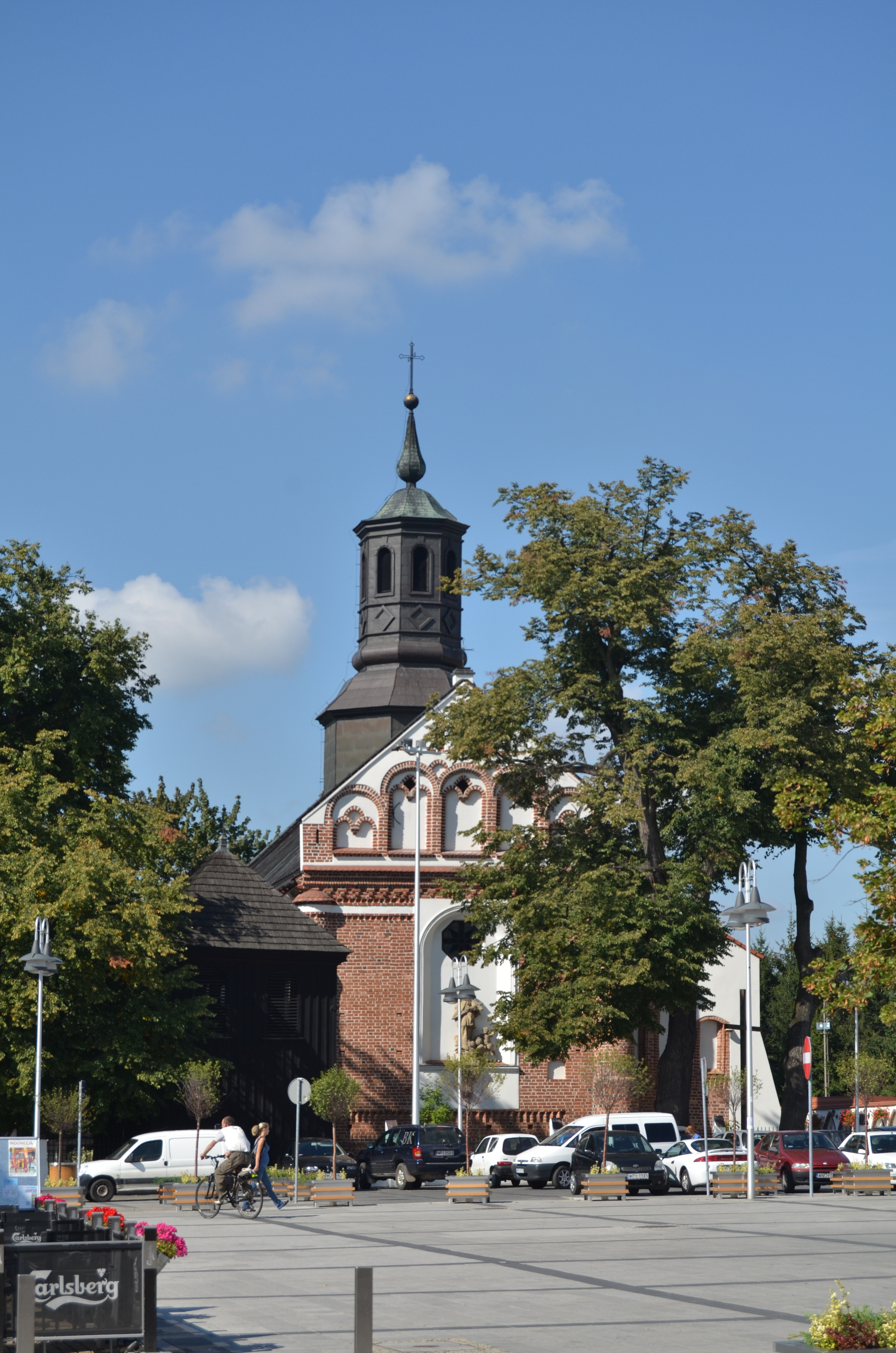
Gothic-Renaissance St. Anne church

The origins of the city date back to a 13th-century village, located on the route between Warsaw and Czersk. Its strategic position meant that the village grew quickly. On 5 November 1429 the town obtained a charter, and soon became a local market. A further charter was confirmed in 1461.

In 1537 the town became Royal property and in the second half of the 16th century reached 1200 inhabitants based round the brewing and transport industries. Piaseczno was a royal town of Poland, administratively located in the Warsaw County in the Masovian Voivodeship in the Greater Poland Province. However, the city suffered setbacks because of numerous fires in the late 16th and early 17th centuries but returned to its former glory in the first half of the 18th century. In 1729, Aleksander Józef Sułkowski, favourite of Prince and future King Augustus III of Poland was appointed starost of Piaseczno. Sułkowski funded the renovation of the local church, which provided it with new Baroque furnishings, and founded a royal hunting lodge. The first documented hunt of Augustus III in Piaseczno took place on 25 June 1735. In 1748–1750 the hunting lodge was replaced by a new Baroque royal palace. Prior to the 1764 Polish–Lithuanian royal election, the palace hosted a meeting of supporters of the candidacy of Jan Klemens Branicki.

During the Kościuszko Uprising, on 9–10 July 1794, the Battle of Gołków was fought nearby between the Poles and the Russians, and then the town was burned by the Russians. Only a church and a few houses survived. The Royal Palace was destroyed by the Russians.

=== Late modern era ===
From 1806 to 1807 a French cavalry unit was stationed in the town as part of the Napoleonic Wars, and from 1808 to 1811 this was replaced by the Polish 1st Regiment mounted rifles. The Congress of Vienna, saw the area ceded to Russia in 1815.

In 1825 the road from Warsaw and shortly afterward the railway improved links to Warsaw. As a result, Piaseczno experienced a period of economic recovery. Local Poles took part in the large January Uprising of 1863–1864. On June 15, 1864, a clash between Polish insurgents and Russian troops took place near Piaseczno.

In 1890, Countess Cecylia Plater-Zyberk bought the Chyliczki estate with the Poniatówka manor house, where she settled. The following year she established a nationally renowned school for girls, where women from low-income families could also receive an education.

In September and October 1914 Piaseczno was the site of fierce fighting between German and Russian forces in the battle for Warsaw. In May 1917, the new City Council held its first council meeting. In November 1918, German gendarmerie surrendered to local Poles and the town was restored to Poland, which just regained independence. In the interbellum Piaseczno formed part of the Polish Warsaw Voivodeship.

On June 4, 1928, Polish President Ignacy Mościcki laid the cornerstone for the folk house and in 1933 Marshal Józef Piłsudski was made an honorary citizen of the city.

=== World War II ===
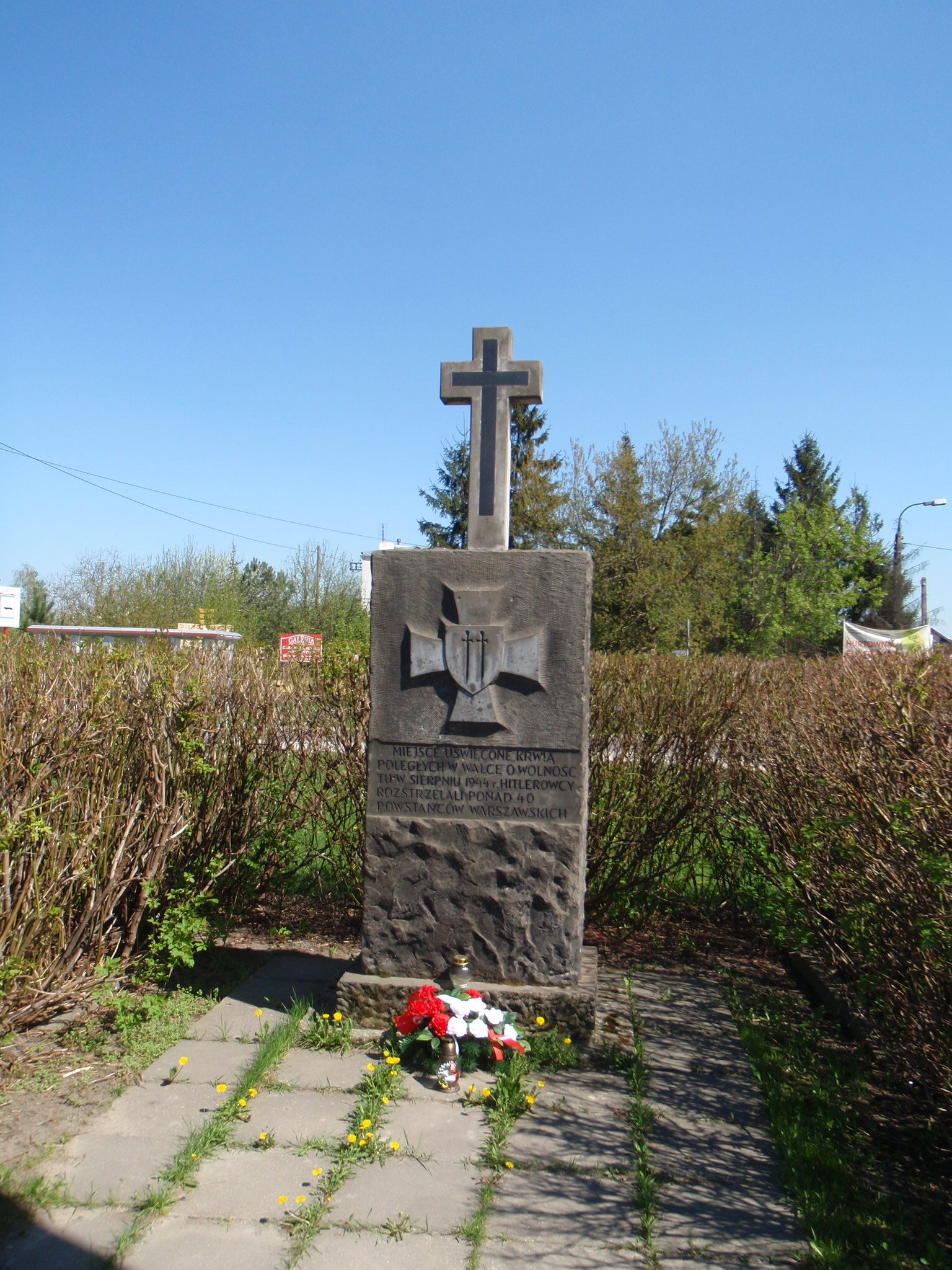
Memorial at the site of a massacre of over 40 Polish insurgents committed by the Germans in 1944

World War II began for the city on 9 and 10 September 1939, when the Polish 54 light artillery regiment fought a skirmish with a German armored division. On September 10, 1939, German troops committed a massacre of 21 Polish prisoners of war in the town (see also Nazi crimes against the Polish nation). Afterwards, the Germans terrorized the population, and Poles over the age of 14 were subjected to forced labour. Additionally, around 400 people were captured in roundups and deported to forced labour in Germany. The Germans also committed massacres of Poles in nearby forests as part of the AB-Aktion.

Several Poles from Piaseczno, including three policemen, were murdered by the Russians in the Katyn massacre in 1940.

In 1940, during the Nazi Occupation of Poland, German authorities established a Jewish ghetto in Piaseczno (the Piaseczno Ghetto), in order to confine its Jewish population for the purpose of persecution and exploitation. The ghetto was liquidated in January 1941, when all its 2,500 inhabitants were transported in cattle trucks to the Warsaw Ghetto, the largest ghetto in all of Nazi occupied Europe with over 400,000 Jews crammed into an area of 1.3 square miles (3.4 km^{2}). From there, most victims were sent to Treblinka extermination camp.

The Polish resistance was active, secret Polish education was organized, and the present-day district of Zalesie Dolne was the location of secret meetings of both the command of the Grey Ranks and the Education Department of the Government Delegation for Poland.

In 1944, local Poles supported the Polish Warsaw Uprising, which took place in nearby Warsaw, and some were killed by the Germans in revenge. During the uprising, the occupiers perpetrated two massacres of Poles within the present-day town limits, killing over 50 people. From August 1944, a secret Polish hospital for wounded insurgents from Warsaw operated in the town. Many Poles fled from the Germans from Warsaw to Piaseczno, and were sheltered by the local population. After the uprising, in October 1944, the German army surrounded Piaseczno and caught some 1,000 Polish refugees from Warsaw. The German occupation ended on January 17, 1945, when the Polish 1st Warsaw Armoured Brigade entered the town without a fight.

=== Recent history ===
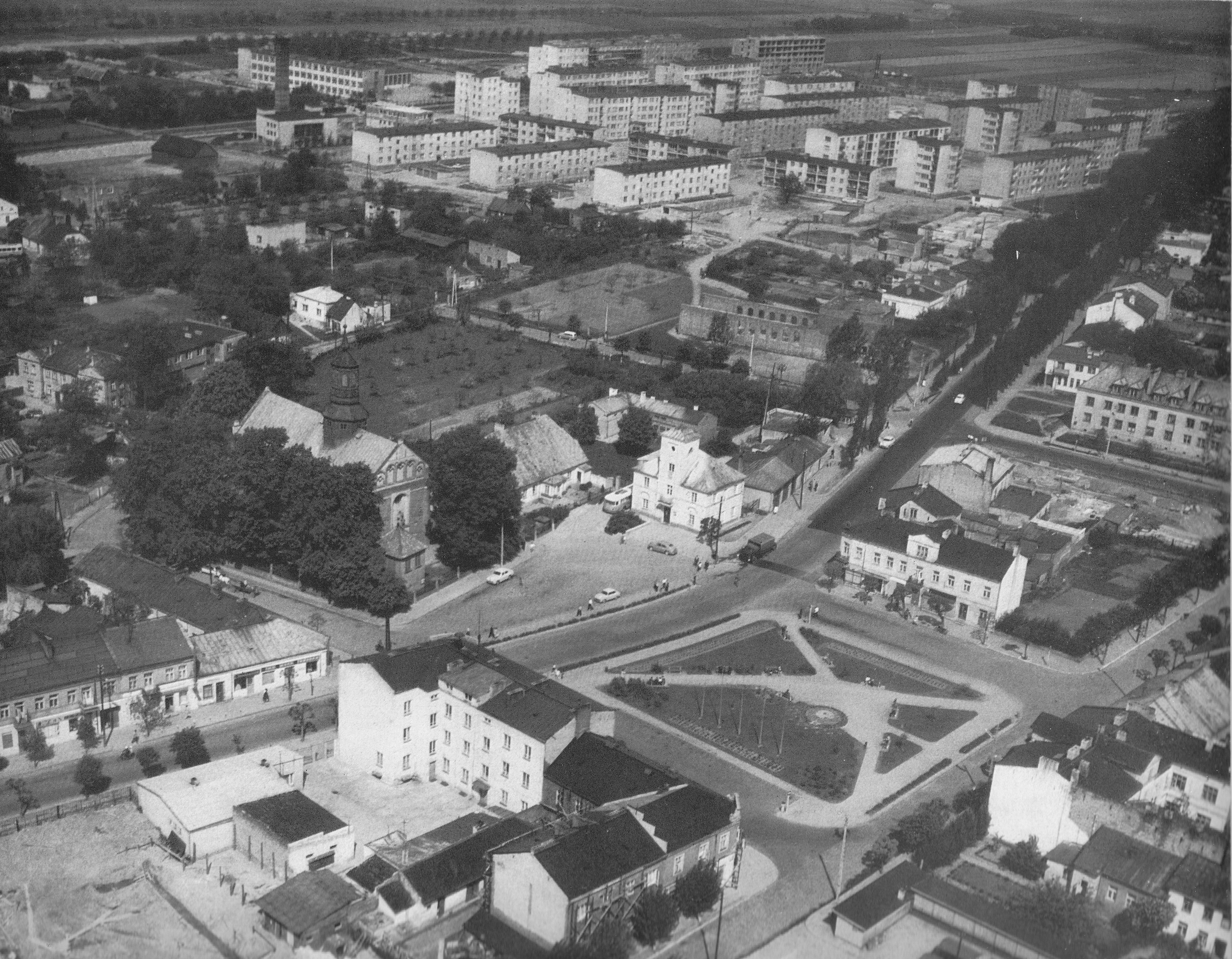
Aerial view in the 1970s

In 1952, town limits were expanded by including the settlements of Orężna, Zalesie Dolne and Zalesinek as new neighbourhoods.

== Education ==
Piaseczno has a long educational tradition. In 1891, Countess Cecylia Plater-Zyberk established a school for rural girls (Szkoła Gospodarstwa Wiejskiego) at the Chyliczki estate, providing education to women from low-income families. The school operated continuously through both World Wars and remains active today as Zespół Szkół Nr 3 im. Cecylii Plater-Zyberkówny, one of the oldest continuously operating educational institutions in the region.

In 1946, the town's first liceum (secondary school) was established as Społeczne Liceum Ogólnokształcące on ulica Zgoda by Zygmunt Dworakowski, then mayor of Piaseczno and later president of Warsaw. The school produced its first 15 graduates in 1949.

Today, Piaseczno County is served by several public and private educational institutions, including three public licea and a number of primary and vocational schools.

=== Town Hall ===
The original Town Hall was burned down in 1655 by the Swedes during the Deluge. The second accidentally burned down in 1730. A third Town Hall was constructed in the middle of the 18th century but was burned down by the Russians in 1794. In 1815 the rebuilding was initiated and the current Town hall was built in a Neoclassical style between 1823 and 1824.

=== Religious communities ===
For some time the town of Piaseczno had a diverse religious community.

- In 1820 there were 893 inhabitants, of whom 171 were Jews (about 19%).
- The 1897 census showed Piaseczno had 2760 inhabitants with 41.5% Catholics, 40% Jewish and 17.9% protestant.
- In 1918 there were 6956 people in the town. Catholics were about 40%, Jews about 56% and sizable protestant and Orthodox populations also existed.

As stated above, the Jewish community was deported by the German occupiers to the Warsaw Ghetto in 1940.

Piaseczno was the seat of a Hasidic dynasty founded by Rabbi Kalonymus Kalman Shapiro, currently maintained by his extended family in Israel.

== Historic and modern landmarks ==
Sights of Piaseczno (examples)

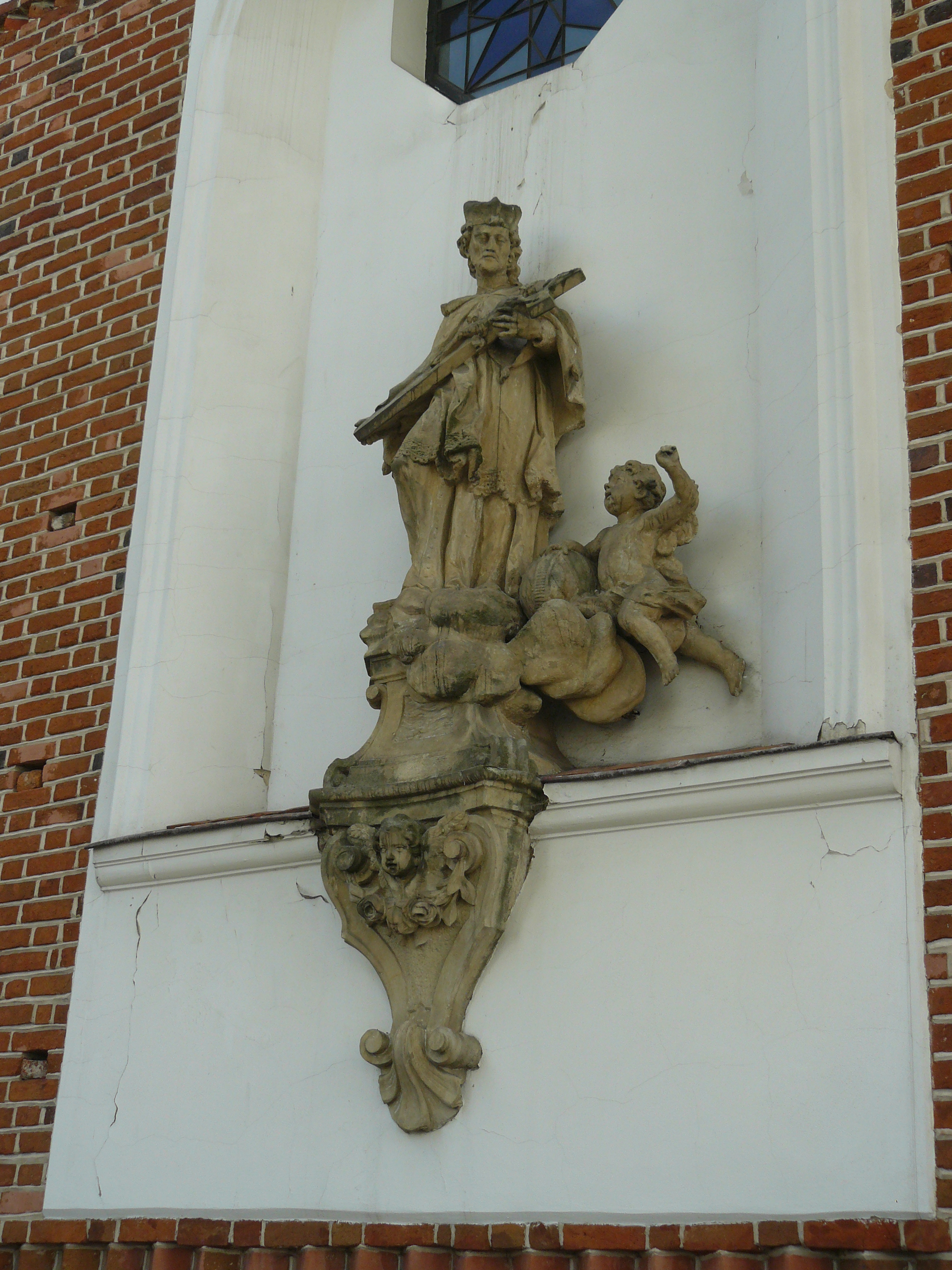
Baroque statue of John of Nepomuk at the Church of St. Anne

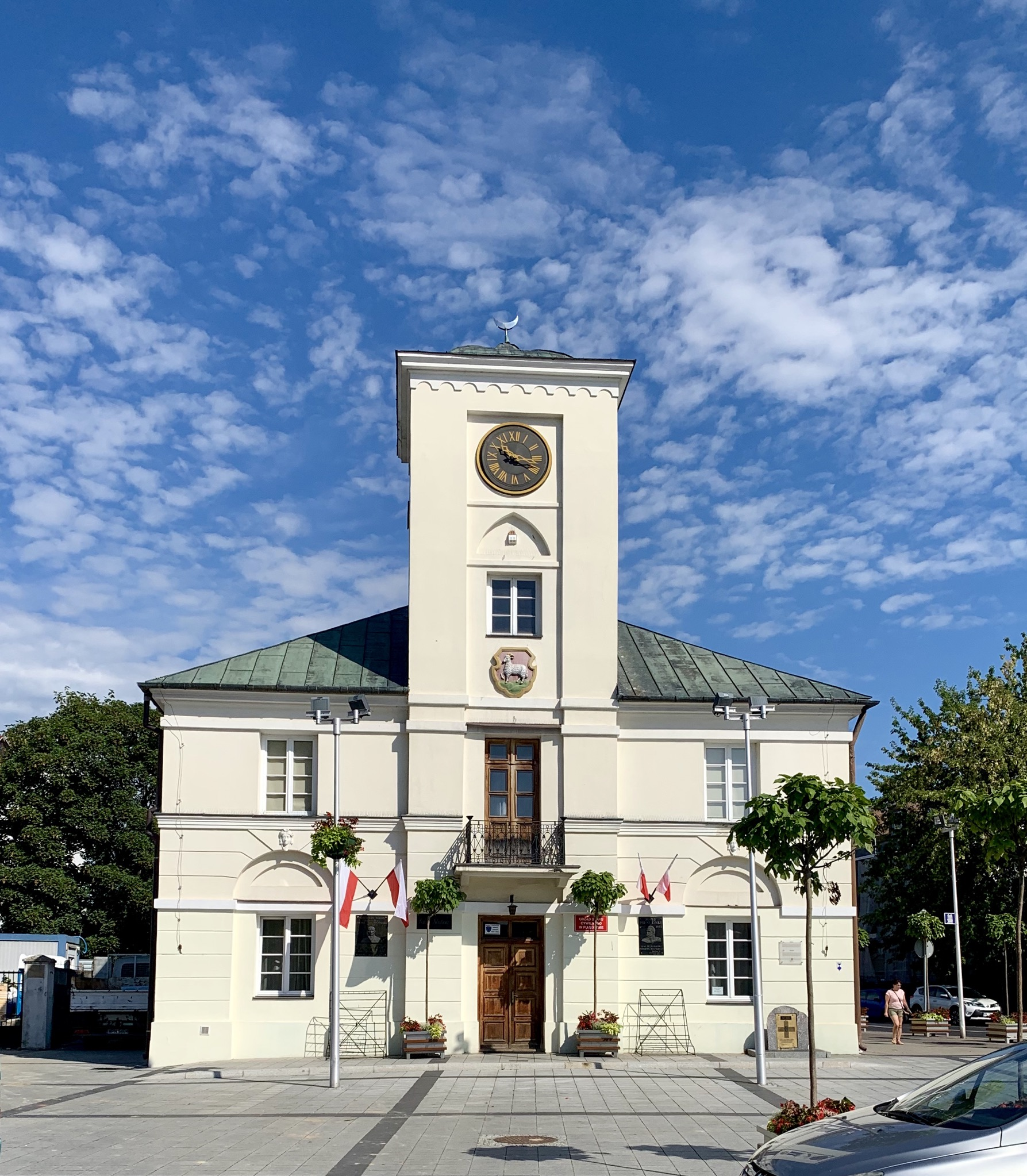
Town Hall

- Gothic-Renaissance Church of St. Anne
- Piaseczno Town Hall
- Regional Museum (Muzeum Regionalne)
- The parish cemetery (1795)
- Villa Besserówka, where the Poles disarmed the German gendarmerie and thus liberated the town from German occupation in 1918
- Narrow gauge railway
- Memorials at the sites of massacres of Poles, perpetrated by the Germans in August 1944
- Former secret Polish hospital for Warsaw Uprising participants with a memorial plaque
- House of Tadeusz Zawadzki nom de guerre Zośka, where the Grey Ranks command held meetings, and Zawadzki hid his memoirs of the Operation Arsenal, on the basis of which Aleksander Kamiński's book Stones for the Rampart was written.
- House-Museum of Georgian Officers of the Polish Army (Dom Muzeum Gruzińskich Oficerów Wojska Polskiego)
- Jewish bath
- Jewish cemetery with a memorial to over 60 Poles and Jews executed there by the German occupiers in 1942–1944
- Former Piaseczno Ghetto

== Notable people ==
- Michał Broniszewski (born 1972), racing driver
- Jacek Dominik (born 1969), civil servant, former European Commissioner
- Agnieszka Dygant (born 1973), actress
- Marek Gołębiewski (born 1980), former footballer, professional manager
- Roman Kosecki (born 1966), footballer, member of the Polish Sejm
- Wanda Łyżwińska (born 1953), politician, member of the Polish Sejm
- Paweł Piasecki (1579–1649), Roman Catholic Bishop, Royal Secretary of King Sigismund III Vasa
- Eliza Roszkowska Öberg (born 1978), politician, member of the Swedish Riksdag
- Witold Sikorski (born 1958), footballer
- Bartosz Soćko (born 1978), chess Grandmaster
- Rafał Ziemkiewicz (born 1964), writer

== International relations ==
=== Twin towns — Sister cities ===
Piaseczno is twinned with:

- Upplands Vasby, Sweden
- Harku Parish, Estonia
- Zviahel, Ukraine
- Guadix, Spain
