= List of presidents of the Polish Scouting and Guiding Association =

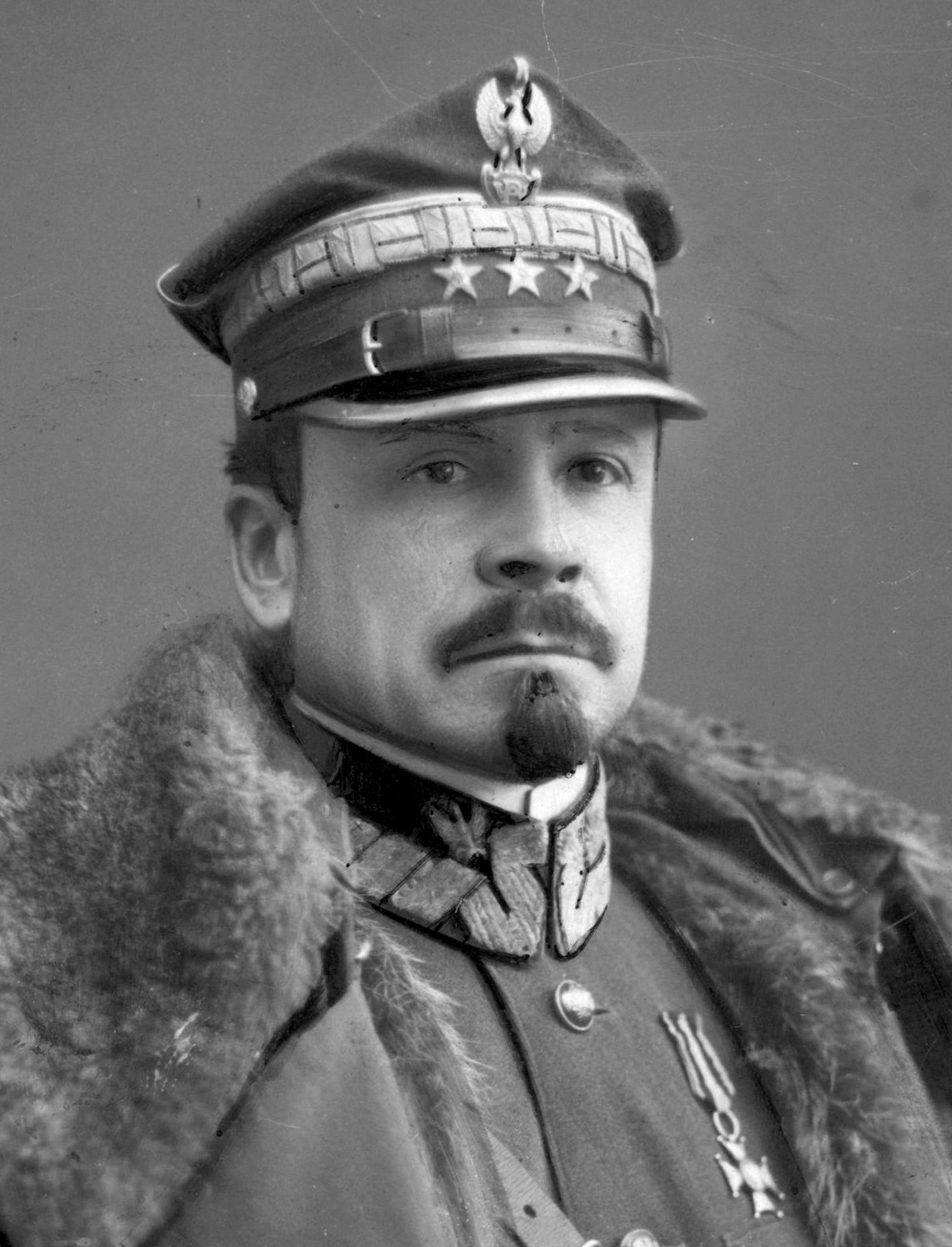
Józef Haller

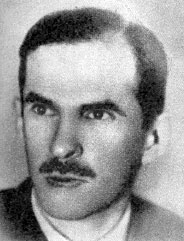
Aleksander Kamiński

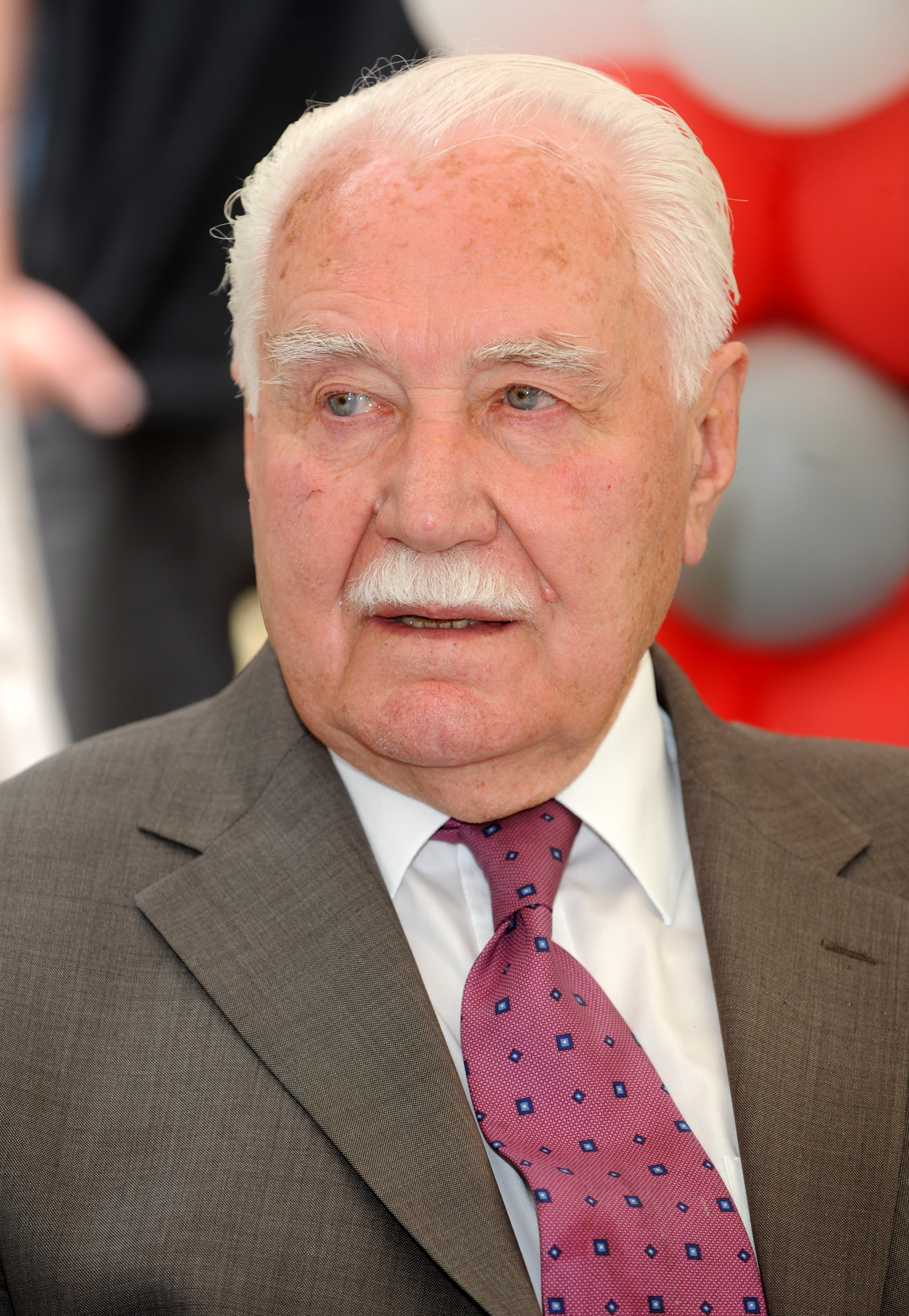
Ryszard Kaczorowski

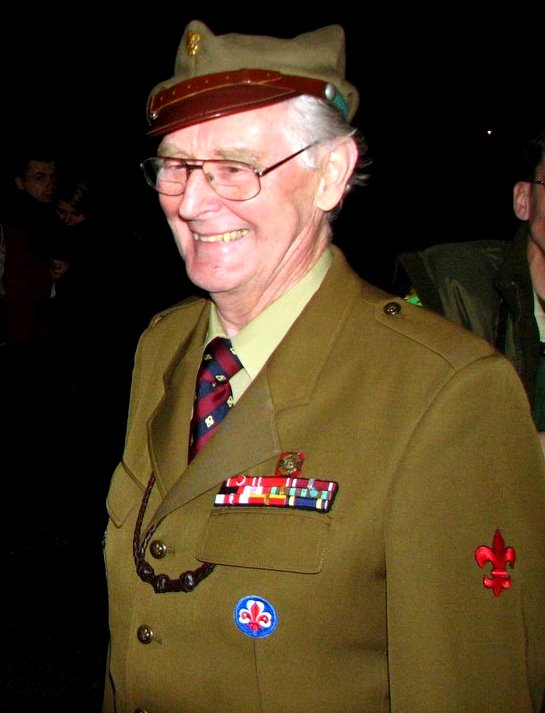
Andrzej Borodzik

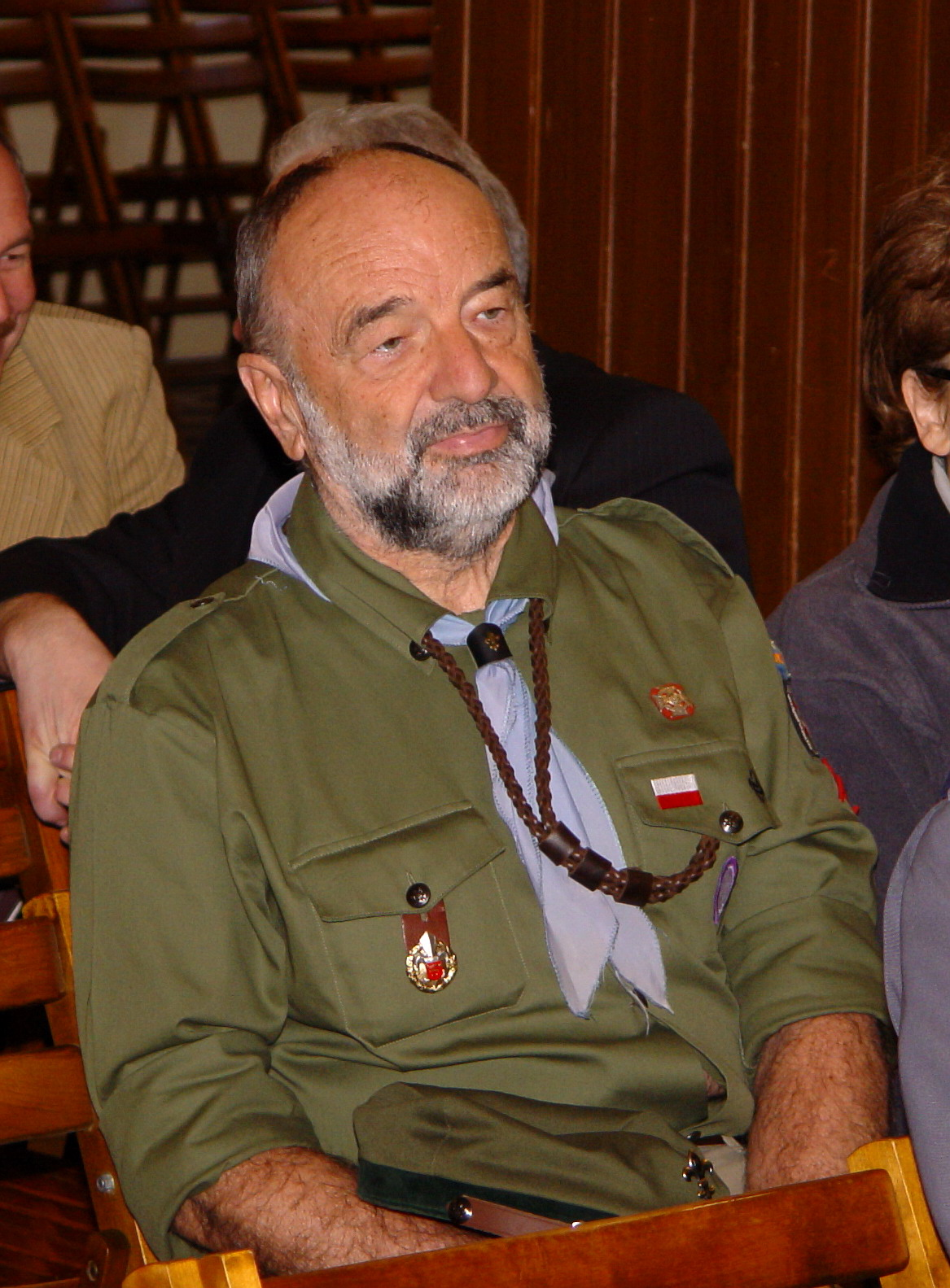
Adam Massalski

The president of the Polish Scouting and Guiding Association (Polish: Przewodniczący Związku Harcerstwa Polskiego, Przewodniczący ZHP) is the highest function in the Polish Scouting and Guiding Association (ZHP). Wiceprzewodniczący/wiceprzewodnicząca ZHP (Vice-President) is his substitute.

== Przewodniczący ZHP before the Second World War ==
- Tadeusz Strumiłło Ph.D. (June 11, 1919 - July 3, 1920);
- Lieutenant General Józef Haller (July 3, 1920 - February 10, 1923);
  - Tadeusz Strumiłło Ph.D. - Vice-President;
  - priest Jan Mauersberger - Vice-President;
- priest Jan Mauersberger (April 7, 1923 - November 10, 1923;
- Tadeusz Strumiłło Ph.D. (November 10, 1923 - April 18, 1925);
  - Maria Wocalewska - Vice-President;
- Roman Bniński (April 18, 1925 - April 12, 1926);
  - Maria Wocalewska - Vice-President;
- Józef Karśnicki (April 12, 1926 - April 24, 1927);
- priest hm. RP Jan Mauersberger (April 24, 1927 - December 29, 1929);
- Władysław Sołtan (December 29, 1929 - February 2, 1931);
- Michał Grażyński Ph.D. (February 2, 1931 - September 1, 1939);
  - priest hm. RP Jan Mauersberger - Vice-President;
  - Wanda Opęchowska - Vice-President;
  - hm. RP Helena Grażyńska (1934-1935 ?) - Vice-President;
  - Brigadier General Józef Zając (May 21, 1939 – September 1, 1939) - Vice-President.

== Przewodniczący ZHP during the Second World War (Szare Szeregi) ==
- priest hm. RP Jan Mauersberger (September 27, 1939 - August 1942) - Acting President;
  - Wanda Opęchowska - Vice-President;
- Tadeusz Kupczyński (August 1942 - December 1944) - Acting President;
  - Wanda Opęchowska - Vice-President.

== Przewodniczący ZHP outside of Poland since 1945 ==
- Michał Grażyński Ph.D. (February 3, 1946 - November 5, 1960);
- hm. Zygmunt Szadkowski (1960–1967);
- hm. Ryszard Kaczorowski (1967–1988);
  - hm. Jan Stanisław Prokop (1967–1968) - Vice-President;
  - hm. Zdzisław Kołodziejski - Vice-President;
- hm. Stanisław Berkieta (1988–1994);
- hm. Bogdan Szwagrzak (1994–2000);
- hm. Barbara Zdanowicz (2004 - December 8, 2006);
- hm. Edmund Kasprzyk (December 10, 2006 - December 5, 2009);
- hm. Teresa Ciecierska (December 6, 2009 - November 21, 2015);
  - hm. Edmund Kasprzyk (December 6, 2009 - January 25, 2011) - Vice President;
- hm. Robert Rospedzihowski (November 22, 2015 – January 21, 2022)
  - hm. Marek Szablewski (February 2, 2019 – January 21, 2022) - Vice President
- hm.Marek Szablewski (January 21, 2022 - Present)

== Przewodniczący ZHP after the Second World War ==
=== Przewodniczący ZHP 1944-1950 ===
- hm. Stanisław Nowakowski (December 1944 - February 1945);
- hm. Janusz Wierusz-Kowalski (February 1945 - 1947);-
- Józef Sosnowski (1947–1949);
- Jerzy Berek (1949–1950).

=== Przewodniczący of the ZHP National Council ===
- hm. Aleksander Kamiński Ph.D. (December 1956 - 1958).

=== Przewodniczący ZHP since 1990 ===
- hm. Stefan Mirowski (December 1990 - July 13, 1996);
  - hm. Anna Zawadzka (1990–1993) - Vice-President;
  - hm. Jarosław Balon - Vice-President;
  - hm. Wojciech Katner - Vice-President;
  - hm. Maria Łyczko - Vice-President;
- prof. hm. Maria Hrabowska - (1996–2001);
  - hm. Krzysztof Pater (1997–2001) - Vice-President;
- prof. hm. Wojciech Katner (2001 - December 2, 2005);
  - hm. Jacek Smura (2001 - December 2, 2005) - Vice-President;
  - hm. Wanda Czarnota (2001 - December 2, 2005) - Vice-President;
- hm. Andrzej Borodzik (December 3, 2005 - September 9, 2007);
  - hm. Mariusz Jachta (December 3, 2005 - September 9, 2007) - Vice-President;
  - hm. Anna Kirkiewicz (December 3, 2005 - September 9, 2007) - Vice-President;
  - hm. Rafał Klepacz (December 3, 2005 - September 9, 2007) - Vice-President;
- prof. hm. Adam Massalski (September 9, 2007 - December 4, 2009);
  - hm. Anna Kirkiewicz (September 9, 2007 - December 4, 2009) - Vice-President;
  - hm. Andrzej Starski (September 9, 2007 - December 4, 2009) - Vice-President;
  - hm. Maciej Szafrański (September 9, 2007 - December 4, 2009) - Vice-President;
- prof. hm. Adam Massalski (December 5, 2009 - );
  - hm. Rafał M. Socha (December 5, 2009 - ) - Vice-President;
  - hm. Dariusz Supeł (December 5, 2009 - ) - Vice-President.
