= Tadeusz Strumiłło =

Polish teacher and Scout

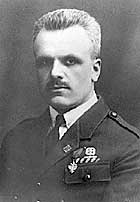
- Tadeusz Strumillo

President of the Polish Scouting Association
- In office 1923-1925

Personal details
- Born: 1884
- Died: 1958 (aged 73–74)
- Occupation: University professor

Tadeusz Strumiłło (1884–1958) was a Polish teacher, harcmistrz (the highest Scouting instructor rank in Poland), the president of the Polish Scouting and Guiding Association (ZHP) from 1923 to 1925. A pedagogue and psychologist, he taught in the Jagiellonian University, and the Catholic University of Lublin. During World War II he was one of the lecturers of the underground universities and supported the Polish Scout resistance movement, the Grey Ranks.
