= Jadwiga Falkowska =

Polish teacher, physicist and scoutmaster

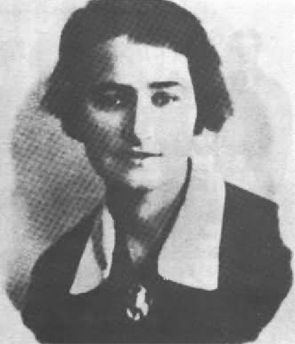
- Born: November 13, 1889; Tver, Russia
- Died: August 7, 1944 (aged 54); Warsaw, General Government
- Other names: Jaga; Zdzisława; Ludwika; Zaleska

Jadwiga Falkowska, codename Jaga, Zdzisława, Ludwika, and Zaleska (November 13, 1889 in Tver, Russia – August 7, 1944 in Warsaw, Poland) was a Polish teacher, physicist, social activist, Scoutmaster (harcmistrzyni) and one of the founders of Girl Scouting in Poland.

As a physicist and teacher, she worked at the Warsaw University of Technology and the Stefan Batory University in Vilnius, and taught physics at the Krzemieniec Lyceum. She was the Chief Scout of the Girl Guides from 1926 to 1927. During the Second World War she served in the Polish resistance (Armia Krajowa). Jadwiga was murdered by RONA units during the first days of the Warsaw Uprising.

== Awards ==
- Order of Polonia Restituta
- Gold Cross of Merit (Krzyż Zasługi)
- Cross of Valour (Krzyż Walecznych)
- Armia Krajowa Cross (Krzyż Armii Krajowej)

== Works ==
- "Czym są sprawności?" (wstęp do książki „Sprawności harcerek”);
- "Dzieje żeńskich kursów instruktorskich"
- "Konferencje programowe instruktorek na tle rozwoju harcerskiej myśli wychowawczej"
- "Rzut oka na rozwój Harcerstwa Żeńskiego w Polsce"
- "Skautki polskie - zarys organizacyjny" (together with Kazimierz Wyrzykowski, Andrzej Małkowski and Emilia Czechwiczówna).

== Bibliography ==
- Anna Zawadzka „Gawędy o tych, które przewodziły”
