= Florian Marciniak =

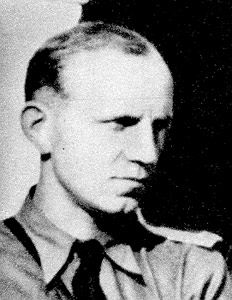
- ps. "Jerzy Nowak"
- Born: 4 May 1915; Gorzyce, Kościan County, partitioned Poland
- Died: 20/21 February 1944 (aged 28); Gross-Rosen concentration camp
- Occupation: Polish scoutmaster (harcmistrz)

Florian Marciniak (codenames: Jerzy Nowak, Nowak, J.Krzemień, Szary, Flo; 4 May 1915 in Gorzyce, Kościan County – 20/21 February 1944 in Gross-Rosen) was a Polish scoutmaster (harcmistrz), and the first Naczelnik (Chief Scout) of the paramilitary scouting resistance organization, the Szare Szeregi, during the Second World War.

Marciniak was a graduate of St. John Cantius High School in Poznań. He was arrested by the Gestapo on 6 May 1943 and murdered in February 1944 at the Gross-Rosen concentration camp.
