= Naczelnik =

Naczelnik (Polish pronunciation: [naˈt͡ʂɛlɲik]) is a Polish word meaning 'leader' or 'chief' (from na czele 'at the forefront'). It may refer to:

- the title used by Tadeusz Kościuszko as the leader of the Kościuszko Uprising, 1794
- Naczelnik Państwa (Chief of State), the title used by Józef Piłsudski as a provisional head of state, 1918–1922
- Naczelnik ZHP, the title used by Chief Scouts of the Polish Scouting and Guiding Association
