= Iwiński =

Iwiński (feminine: Iwińska, plural: Iwińscy) is a surname of Polish origin. It may refer to:

- Adam Iwiński (1958–2010), Polish director and cinematographer
- Andrzej Iwiński (1946–2020), Polish sailor
- Katarzyna Iwińska-Tomicka (1517–1551), Polish noblewoman
- Kazimierz Iwiński, Polish educator
- Marcin Iwiński, Polish billionaire
- Tadeusz Iwiński (born 1944), Polish politician
