= Ryszard Pacławski =

Polish lawyer and Scouting leader

Ryszard Pacławski (born 1958 in Sanok) is a Polish lawyer, Scoutmaster (harcmistrz) and former Naczelnik ZHP (Chief Scout) from 1991 until 2000.
