= Stanisław Sedlaczek =

Polish professor, scoutmaster and resistance fighter

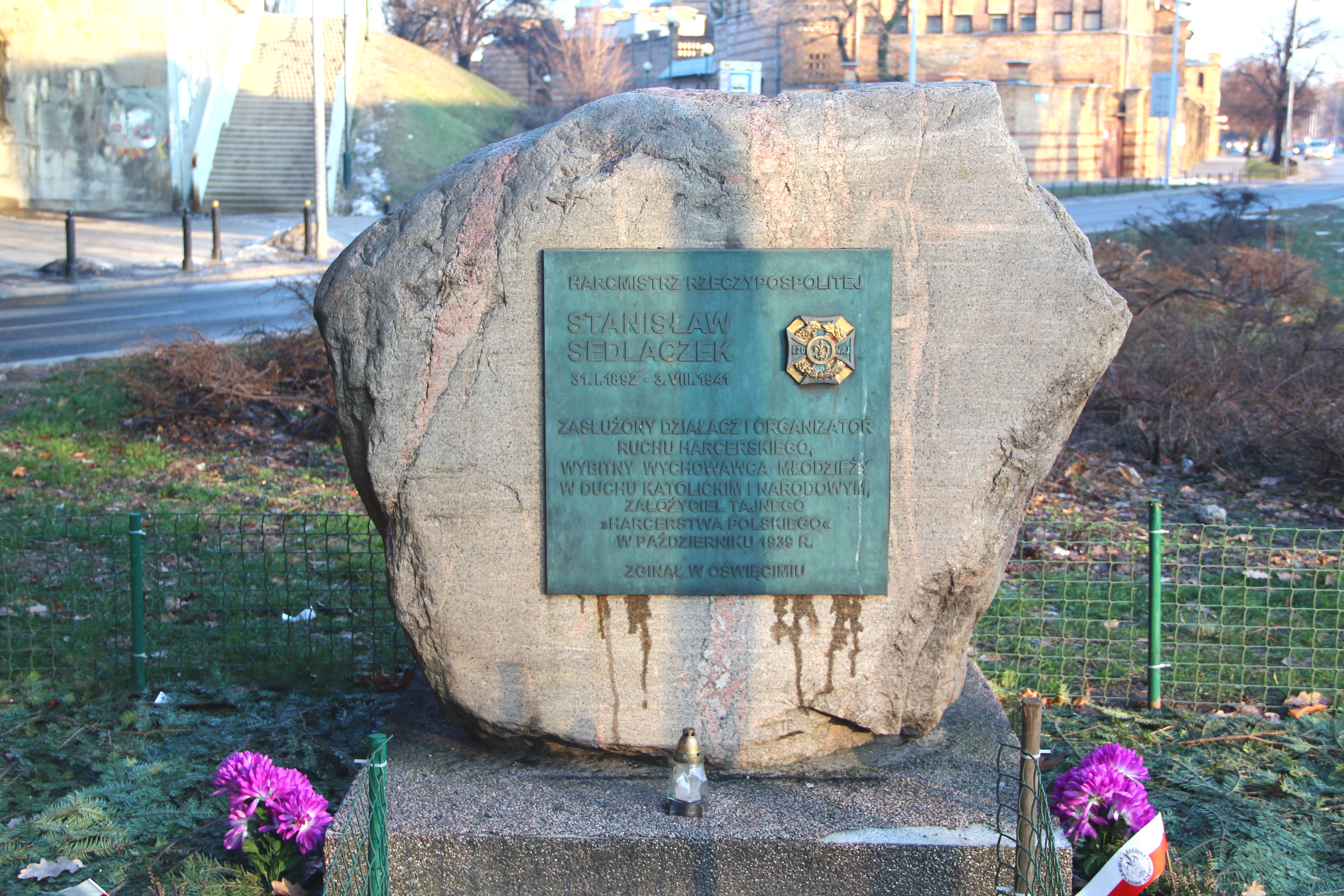
Memorial stone in Warsaw at the Stanisław Sedlaczek roundabout

Stanisław Sedlaczek (31 January 1892 – 3 August 1941), born in Kołomyja, in what is now Ukraine, was a Polish professor and scoutmaster. He served as the Chief Scout of the Polish Boy Scouts from 1919 to 1921. One of the organizers of pre-war Sokół troops among university students, he founded the underground resistance scouting organisation "Hufce Polskie" during World War II.

Sedlaczek was arrested and sent to the German concentration camp of Auschwitz, where he was murdered in 1941.
