= Wojciech Rostafiński =

Polish soldier and scientist

- Born: 19 September 1921 Warsaw, Poland
- Died: 6 July 2002 (aged 80)
- Service: Armia Krajowa
- Conflicts: Warsaw Uprising; World War II

Wojciech Antoni Rostafiński (19 September 1921 – 6 July 2002), codename "Masłowski", was a Polish soldier in the Armia Krajowa during World War II and former scientist working for NASA. He was born in Warsaw.

In 1944 Rostafiński took part in the Warsaw Uprising as a member of Szare Szeregi (Gray Ranks-Boy Scouts) "Rygiel" Group.

For his bravery during the Uprising, Rostafiński was awarded the order of Virtuti Militari.

In 1953 Rostafiński moved to United States. He completed his doctorate at Columbia University. He was manager of advanced research projects at NASA Lewis Research Center in Cleveland, Ohio. During his career, he contributed to the theory of aeronautics and applied mathematics, and his work is listed in the Scientific Citation Index.

== Honours and awards ==
- Cross of Valour
- Virtuti Militari (V class)
- Commander of the Order of Polonia Restituta (1993)
- Commander of the Order of Merit of the Republic of Poland (1998)
