= Zofia Zakrzewska =

Polish scoutmaster

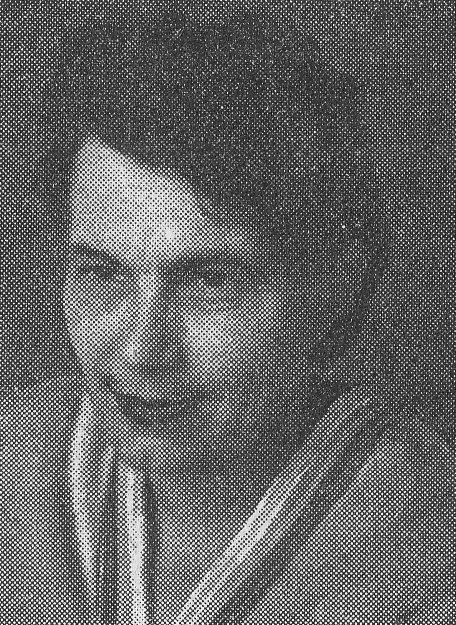

Zofia Zakrzewska (7 April 1916 – 8 January 1999) was a Polish scoutmaster of the Polish Scouting Association and Naczelnik ZHP (1956–1964).

== See also ==
- Scouting in Poland
