= Marian Gieszczykiewicz =

Polish physician and bacteriologist

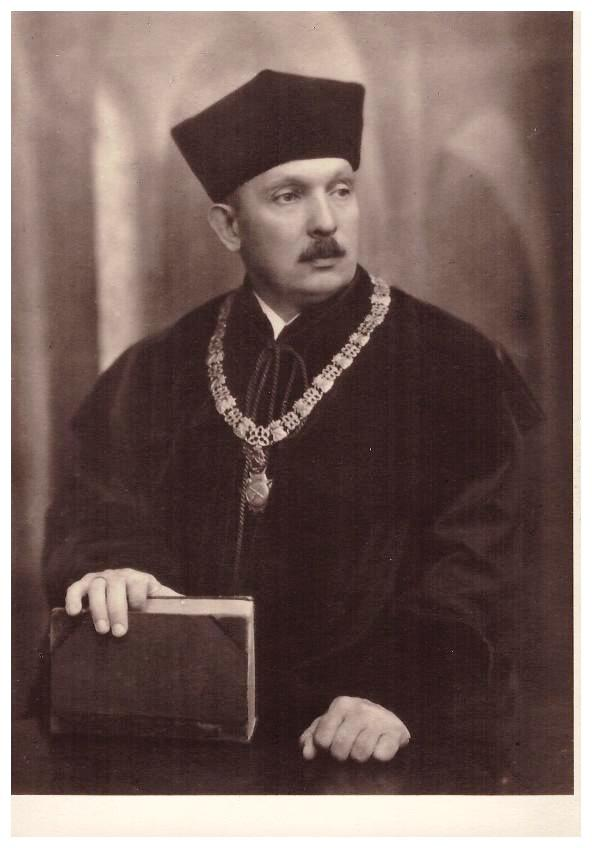
Image of Marian Gieszczykiewicz

Marian Teodor Ludwik Gieszczykiewicz (born 21 May 1889 in Kraków, Austria-Hungary – 21 July 1942 in Auschwitz) was a Polish physician and bacteriologist.

Gieszczykiewicz was professor at the Jagiellonian University starting in 1924 and member of the Polish Academy of Skills. During the German occupation he taught at the so-called "Secret Universities".

He was imprisoned in the German concentration camp Auschwitz. Gerhard Palitzsch assassinated him on 31 July 1942.
