= Mieczysław Małecki =

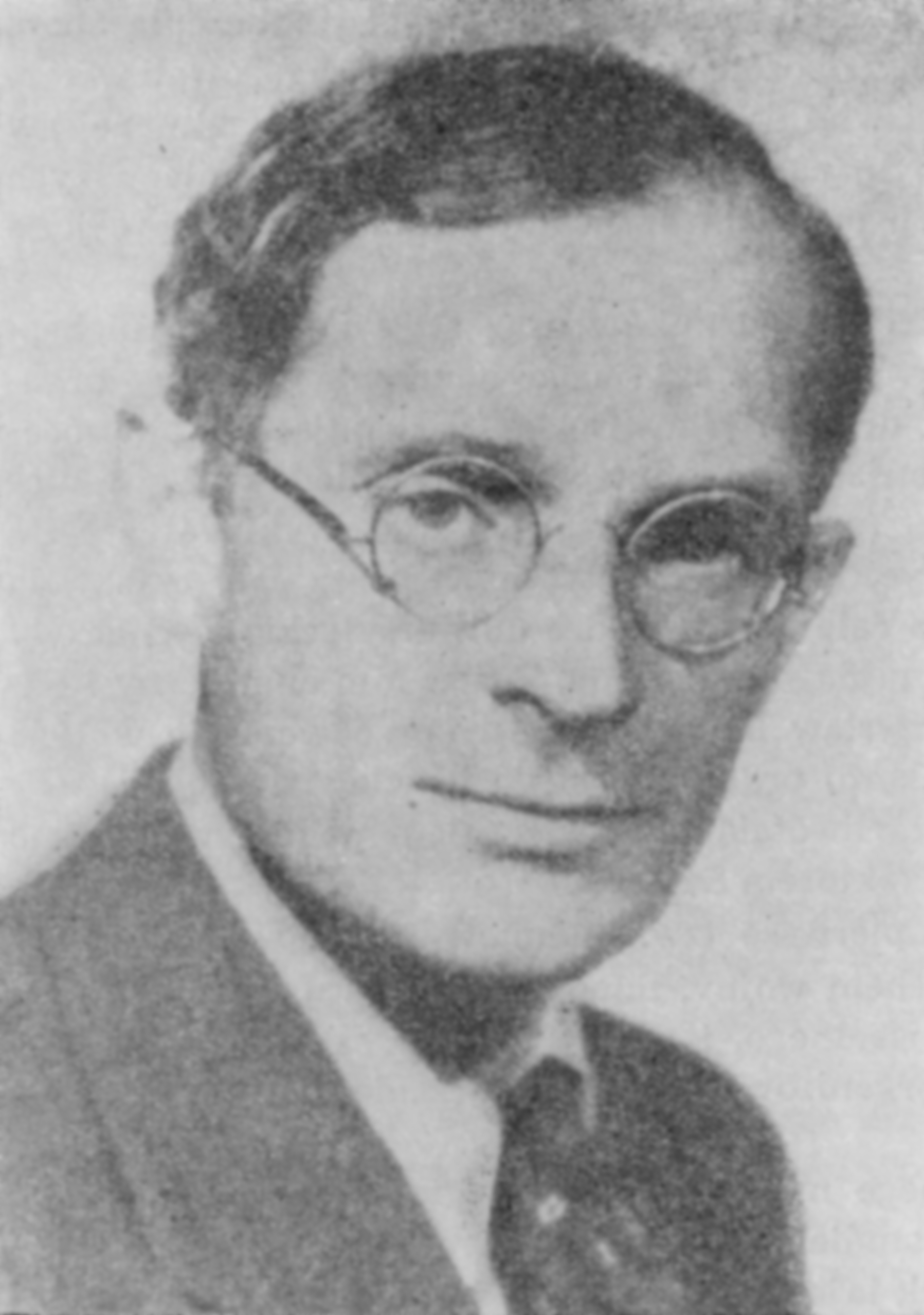
Mieczysław Małecki

Mieczysław Małecki (14 July 1903 – 3 September 1946) was a Polish linguist. Professor at the Jagiellonian University in Kraków, during World War II under a cover of collaboration with the Nazi-run Institut für Deutsche Ostarbeit he in fact, with support of the Polish Underground State, used his position to organize much of the Polish underground education in occupied Kraków. He resumed his post at the Jagiellonian University after the war, although he died shortly afterwards (in 1946).
