= Józef Zając =

Polish general and pilot

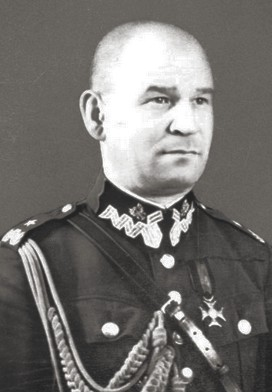
- Born: March 14, 1891; Rzeszów, Austria-Hungary
- Died: December 12, 1963 (aged 72) Ottawa, Canada
- Allegiance: Poland
- Service years: from 1912
- Rank: generał dywizji
- Conflicts: Polish-Bolshevik War, Second World War (Polish Defensive War)
- Awards: Srebrny Krzyż Orderu Wojennego Virtuti Militari Krzyż Komandorski Orderu Odrodzenia Polski Krzyż Oficerski Orderu Odrodzenia Polski Krzyż Niepodległości Złoty Krzyż Zasługi z Mieczami Krzyż Walecznych (4-times)

Józef Ludwik Zając (pron. Za-YANTz) (1891–1963) was a Polish general and pilot.

== Biography ==
Born on 14 March 1891 in Rzeszów, Józef Zając studied at the Jagiellonian University in Kraków, graduating with a PhD in philosophy in 1915. He joined the Polish pro-independence organization of that time; in 1912 he joined the Riflemen's Association where he took the course to gain the qualifications of a military officer.

In 1914 he joined the Polish Legions in First World War; he commanded the 3rd, 6th, 5th and again 3rd regiments (pułks). In 1918 he joined the Blue Army of general Józef Haller; until mid-1920 he spent most of his time in France (among other things, he attended the École Supérieure de Guerre). He took part in the last phase of the Polish-Soviet War: on 17 August 1920 he became the chief of staff of an Operational Group 'Wisła' of the Polish 5th Army, later, Operational Group 'North' of the 2nd Army, and finally, of the 3rd Army.

In the interwar period he continued his military career. In 1922 he became the chief of staff of the First Department of General Staff; in 1924 he was promoted to brigade general; in 1925 he became the First Deputy of the Chief of General Staff; in 1926 he became the commander of the Polish 26th Infantry Division. In 1936 he became the commander of the Kraków Military District and Inspector of the Polish Air Force. In 1937 he began aircraft pilot training and became the Commander of Air Defence. In 1939 he was the Deputy Chairman of the Polish Scouting and Guiding Association.

In February 1939 he succeeded General Ludomił Rayski as the Commander of Polish Air Force. Józef Zając was a strong supporter of the air superiority doctrine which emphasized strong fighter forces at the expense of a bomber force; however he had little time to implement his plans. After the German and Soviet conquest of Poland, he escaped to France, where he again became the commander of the recreated Polish Air Force as well as resuming his duties in the Polish Scouting and Guiding Association (ZHP).

After the fall of France he evacuated to Great Britain. In September 1940 he became the deputy commander of Polish I Corps. Next year he became the commander of the Polish Air Force in the Middle Eastern theatre and was promoted to division general. After Anders Army passed to Western command, he became the deputy commander of the Polish Army in the Middle Eastern theatre until March 1943. Later, until 1946 he was the Inspector of Training of the Polish Armed Forces in the West.

After the end of the Second World War, he elected not to return to communist Poland. He settled in Edinburgh, where he received another PhD in philosophy and worked in academia. During his life, he published several works - academic works in the areas of psychology and military science as well as his own memoirs from the war.

Zając died in Ottawa on 12 December 1963. His name was taken by the 21 Brygada Strzelców Podhalańskich (21 Brigade of Podhale Riflemen).

== Honours and awards ==
- Silver Cross of the Order of Virtuti Militari
- Commander's Cross of the Order of Polonia Restituta, previously awarded the Officer's Cross
- Cross of Independence
- Cross of Valour (four times),
- Gold Cross of Merit with Swords
- Merit of the Forces in Central Lithuania
- Military Merit Cross, Austro-Hungary
- Military Merit Medal "Signum Laudis", Austro-Hungary
- Companion of the Order of the Bath, (United Kingdom)
- Chevalier of the Legion of Honour, (France)
- Iron Cross, Second Class (Germany)
