= Orężna =

Neighbourhood of Piaseczno, Poland

- Neighbourhood of Piaseczno
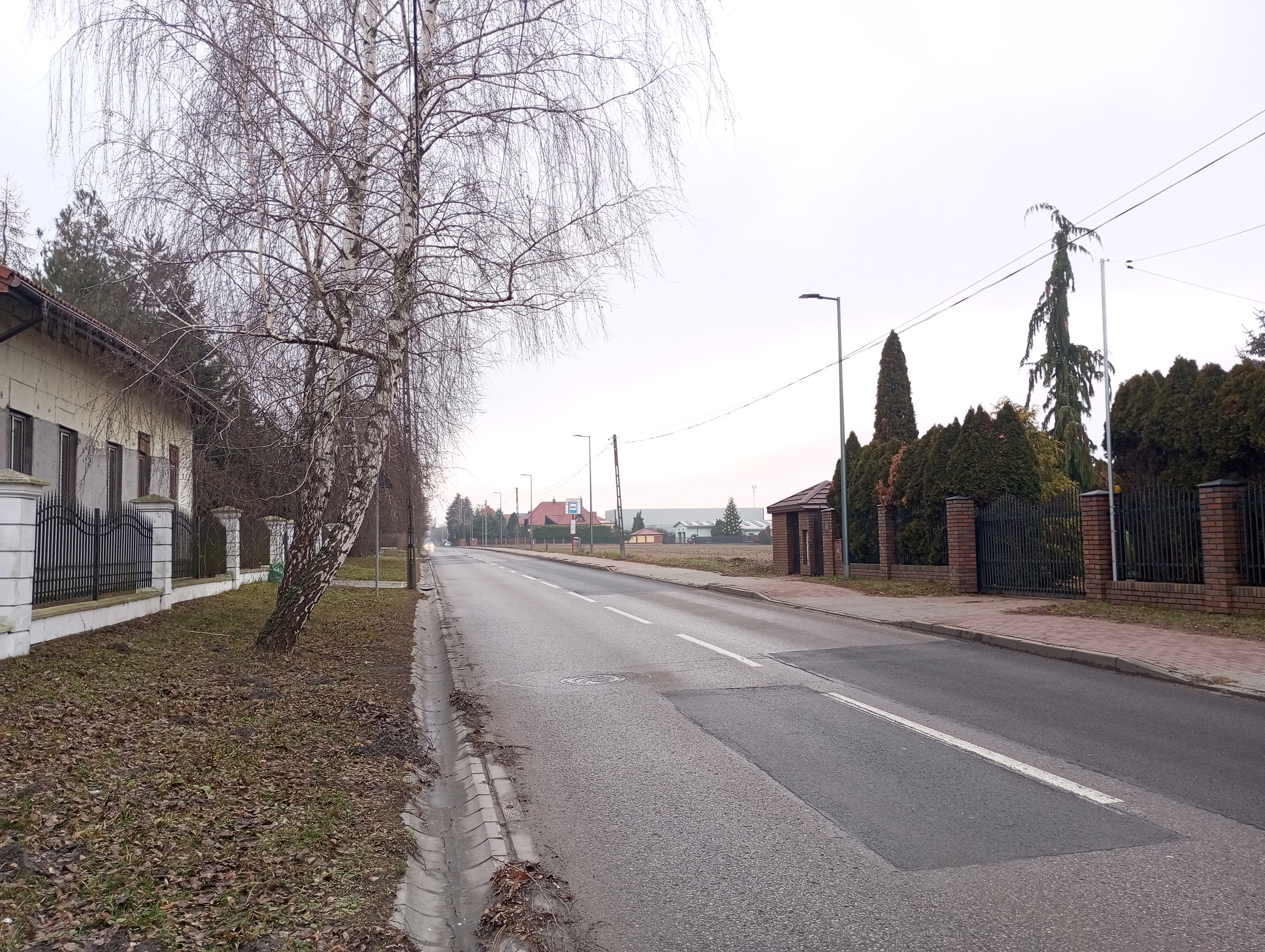

- Location within Poland
- Coordinates: 52°04′13″N 20°59′58″E
- Country: Poland
- Voivodeship: Masovian
- County: Piaseczno
- Gmina: Piaseczno
- Town: Piaseczno
- Founded: 1801
- Within town limits: 1952
- Time zone: UTC+1 (CET)
  - Summer (DST): UTC+2 (CEST)
- Postal code: 05-500
- Vehicle registration: WPI
- Primary airport: Warsaw Chopin Airport

Orężna [ɔˈrɛ̃ʐna] is a neighbourhood of Piaseczno, Poland, located in the western part of the town, in the Warsaw metropolitan area.

== History ==
The settlement was established in 1801 under the name Świniary, which came from the word świnia, which means "pig", as the inhabitants were engaged in pig farming. In 1820 it was renamed Orężna after the Polish word oręż, which means "weapon".

In the interwar period, it was administratively located in the Warsaw County in the Warsaw Voivodeship. According to the 1921 census, the village had a population of 115, entirely Polish by nationality, 68.7% Roman Catholic and 31.3% Lutheran by confession.

Following the joint German-Soviet invasion of Poland, which started World War II in September 1939, Orężna was occupied by Germany. In 1944, local man Bolesław Grzywaczewski hid two Polish resistance members in Orężna. The following day, two Ukrainian auxiliaries arrived to find the partisans. The partisans threw a grenade at them, killing, according to various testimonies, either one or both of the Ukrainians. In retaliation, on August 4, 1944, either the Germans or Ukrainians pacified the village, murdering three women, a man and a 5-year-old girl, then captured nine men and one woman and massacred them in nearby Zalesie Dolne. (Note: See Nazi crimes against the Polish nation)

Orężna was included within the town limits of Piaseczno as its new neighbourhood in 1952.
