= Józef Zawadzki (chemist) =

Polish chemist

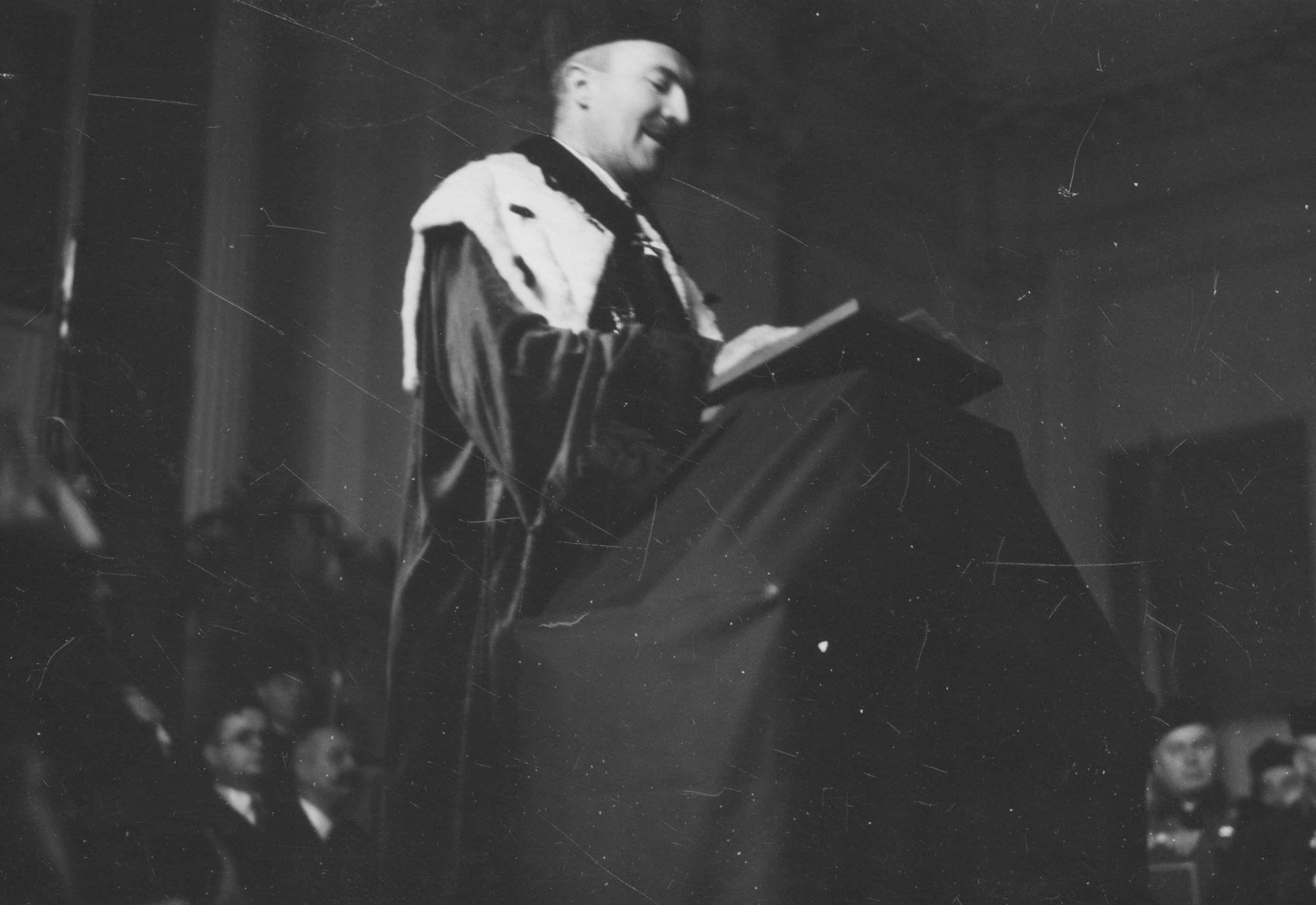
- Portrait of Zawadzki, whilst rector of PW, awarding an honorary doctorate to Edward Śmigły-Rydz, 1938. From the National Digital Archives
- Born: 14 July 1886; Warsaw, Masovian Governorate, Congress Poland
- Died: 22 February 1951 (aged 64); Zalesie Dolne, Warsaw Voivodeship, Republic of Poland
- Title: Rector
- Children: Anna Zawadzka; Tadeusz Zawadzki

Academic work
- Discipline: Chemistry
- Sub-discipline: Physical chemistry

Józef Zawadzki (14 July 1886 in Warsaw – 22 February 1951 in Zalesie, near Warsaw) was a Polish physical chemist and technologist. Father of Tadeusz (Zośka) and Anna Zawadzka.

Zawadzki was a co-founder, President and Vice-President of the Polskie Towarzystwo Chemiczne. He was a professor (from 1923) and rector (1936–1939) of Warsaw University of Technology, and a member of the Polish Academy of Learning (since 1947).

The oldest and largest traditional lecture hall at the Warsaw University of Technology is named Prof. Józef Zawadzki Auditorium.

== Research ==
His main field of research was physicochemical fundamentals of chemical technology. He was researching contact oxidation of ammonia, naphthalene and anthracene, mechanism of ammonia oxidation on platinum at low temperatures, reduction of iron dioxide by a methane, methods of obtaining aluminium oxide from Polish kaolinite and aluminosilicate, use of Polish anhydrite and gypsum deposit to production sulfuric acid and cementum, kinematics of thermal dissociation.

Under the German occupation of Poland during World War II, he was involved in the clandestine operation of the Warsaw University of Technology. Together with Marceli Struszyński, Zawadzki analyzed captured German V-2 rocket for its fuel composition. In 1947, he was recognized with a Doctor Honoris Causa.

=== Mechanism of ammonia oxidation on platinum at low temperatures ===
The mechanism of ammonia oxidation on platinum at low temperature was postulated by F. Rachsig (1927) and later adapted by Zawadzki (1948, 1950) to proceed via formation on imide (NH). In this proposal formation of nitroxyl and hydrazine (N_{2}H_{4}) is involved:

NH_{3} + O_{(a)} → NH_{(a)} + H_{2}O
NH_{(a)} + O_{(a)} → HNO_{(a)} + *
NH_{(a)} + NH_{3} → N_{2}H_{4(a)}
HNO_{(a)} + NH_{3} → N_{2}H_{4(a)} + ½O_{2}
N_{2}H_{4(a)} + O_{2} → N_{2} + 2H_{2}O + *

Later, Y. M. Fogel (1964) disproved the Zawadzki theory that NH is formed via the oxidation of ammonia. In his proposal, NO is an important intermediate of the reaction. The formation of N_{2}O is not detected, therefore the mechanism does not involve its production.

== Works ==
- Technologia chemiczna nieorganiczna vol. 1–2 (1948–1949)
