= Konstanty Troczyński =

Polish literature theoretician and critic (1906–1942)

Konstanty Troczyński (9 December 1906 in Częstochowa — 27 May 1942 in Auschwitz) was a Polish literature theoretician and critic.

Troczyński worked at the Adam Mickiewicz University in Poznań. During the Second World War and the German occupation of Poland he taught at the so-called "Secret Universities" in Kraków. He was arrested by the Gestapo and murdered in the German concentration camp Auschwitz.

== Works ==
- Od formizmu do moralizmu (1935)
- Artysta i dzieło (1938)
