= Wiktor Kinecki =

Polish politician (1929–2026)

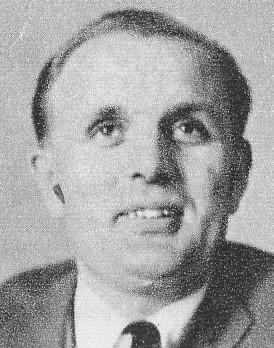
- Kinecki c. 1965

Member of the Sejm
- In office 21 March 1976 – 21 March 1980

Personal details
- Born: Wiktor Zdzisław Kinecki; 31 December 1929 Międzychód, Poland
- Died: 4 January 2026 (aged 96) Wrocław, Poland
- Party: PZPR
- Education: University of Warsaw
- Occupation: Diplomat

Wiktor Zdzisław Kinecki (31 December 1929 – 4 January 2026) was a Polish politician and diplomat.

== Biography ==
Kinecki was a member of the Secretariat of the World Federation of Democratic Youth in Budapest from 1958 to 1962. Between 1964 and 1969 he was Chief Scout of the Polish Scouting and Guiding Association. A member of the Polish United Workers' Party, Kinecki was a deputy member of the Politburo between 1964 and 1980, as well as deputy head of the Foreign Department of the Central Committee from 1970 to 1971. He served in the Sejm from 1976 to 1980.

Kinecki served as ambassador to India, with accreditation to Sri Lanka, Singapore, and Nepal, from 1971 to 1975, and as ambassador to Yugoslavia from 1979 to 1986.

Kinecki died in Wrocław on 4 January 2026, at the age of 96.
