= Stefan Inglot =

Polish historian (1902–1994)

Stefan Inglot (June 10, 1902, in Albigowa near Łańcut – January 10, 1994, in Wrocław, Poland) was a Polish historian and a cooperative activist.

He graduated from the Lwów University. At the same university he gained PhD in 1926 and passed his habilitation in history in 1932. He was professor on the Lwów University since 1939. During the German occupation of Poland in World War II he became principal of the Underground University of Lwów, accidentally jailed.

In 1946 he was appointed professor at the Wrocław University and since 1991 member of the Polish Academy of Skills (PAU).

== Works ==
- Kolonizacja wewnętrzna a napływ Niemców od XVI do XVIII w. (1945)
- Udział chłopów w obronie Polski. Zarys historyczny (1946)
- Historia chlopów polskich (t. 1-2 1970–72)
