= Anna Zawadzka =

Polish anti-Nazi

Anna Zawadzka Harcmistrzyni
- Born: 8 February 1919; Warsaw, Warsaw Voivodeship, Second Polish Republic
- Died: 22 June 2004 (aged 85); Warsaw, Masovian Voivodeship, Third Polish Republic
- Burial place: Powązki cemetery
- Father: Józef Zawadzki
- Relatives: Tadeusz Zawadzki (brother)
- World War II
- Allegiance: Polish Underground State
- Branch: Home Army
- Service years: 1942-1944
- Rank: Komendant
- Commands: Grey Ranks
- Battles: Warsaw Uprising

Anna Zawadzka (8 February 1919, Warsaw – 22 June 2004, Warsaw) was a Polish teacher, author of textbooks, scoutmaster (harcmistrzyni), sister of Tadeusz Zawadzki and daughter of professor and chemist Józef Zawadzki.

== Biography ==
During the years 1937-1942 Zawadzka was a Girl Guides patrol leader. In 1942-1944 she was the Komendant of the central Warsaw secret underground Grey Ranks troop, and took part in the Warsaw Uprising in 1944.

After the war Zawadzka worked as a teacher of the English language and logic at Warsaw University and in high schools. She continued to be an active scout leader until they were forcibly disbanded by the communist government in 1948. After their reconstitution in the 1980s, she played an active role in reforming the Polish Scouting Association (ZHP). In 1990-1993 she was vice-president of the ZHP. She was the author of a number of articles, including Dzieje harcerstwa żeńskiego w Polsce w latach 1911-1949 (transl. History of the Girl Scout movement in Poland, 1911-1949).

She died on 22 June 2004 in Warsaw and is buried in the Powązki Cemetery.
