= Education in Poland during World War II =

Overview of education in occupied Poland during World War II

During World War II in Poland, education often took place underground. Secretly conducted education prepared scholars and workers for the postwar reconstruction of Poland and countered German and Soviet threats to eradicate Polish culture.

== Background: repressions of Polish education ==
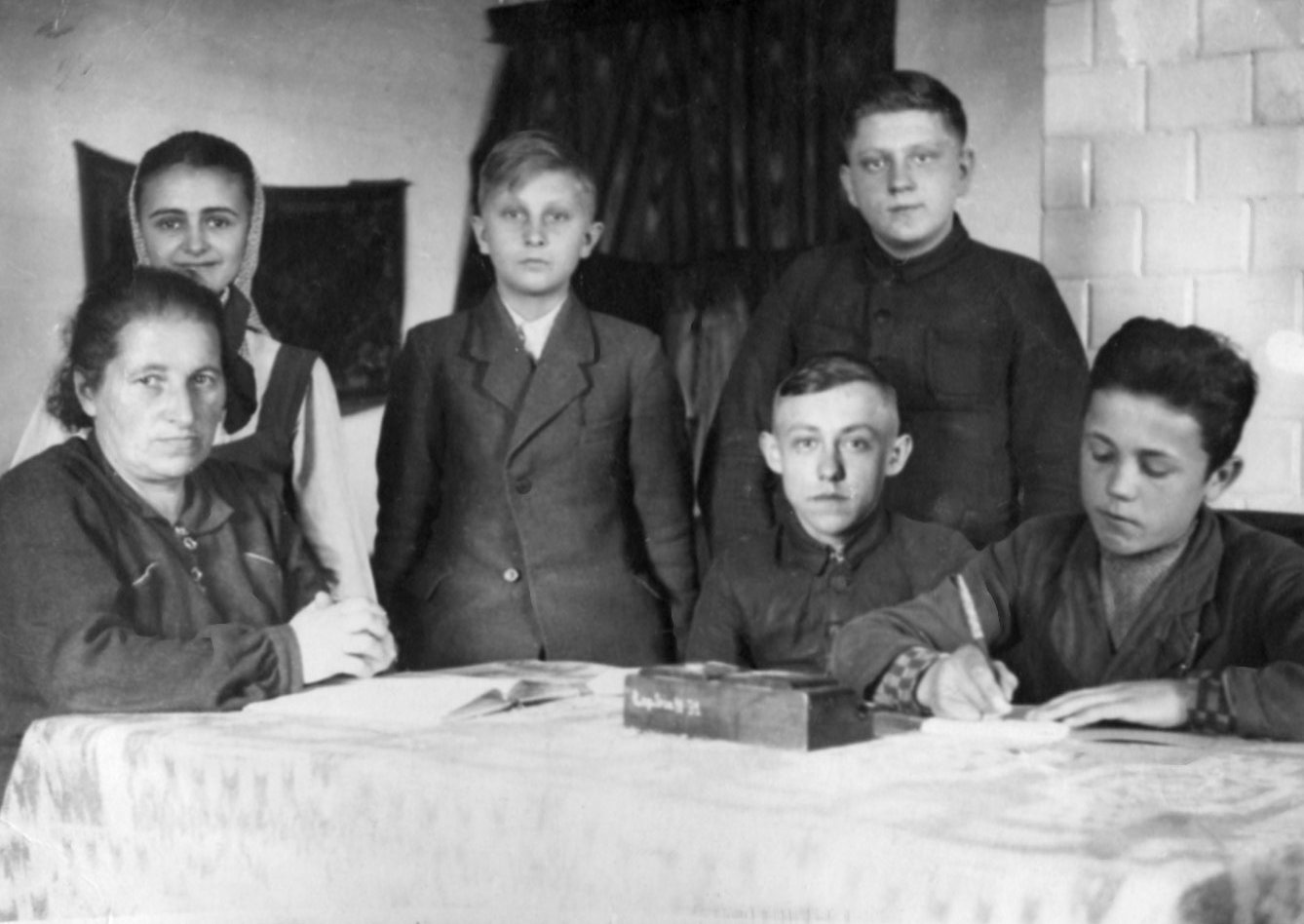
Łopiennik Górny 1941 - Education in Poland during World War II

After the Polish defeat in the invasion of Poland of 1939 and the subsequent German and Soviet occupation of Polish territory, Poland was divided into the areas directly incorporated into the Reich, areas directly incorporated into the Soviet Union and the German-controlled General Government. According to Nazi racial theories the Slavs needed no higher education and the whole nation was to be turned into uneducated serfs for the German race. The only schools that remained opened were trade schools and courses for factory workers. Himmler prescribed:

For the non-German population of the East there can be no type of school above the four-grade rudimentary school. The job of these schools should be confined to the teaching of counting (no higher than up to 500), the writing of one's name, and the teaching that God's commandment means obedience to the Germans, honesty, industry and politeness. Reading I do not consider essential.

By 1941, the number of children attending elementary school in the General Government was half of the pre-war number.

On the territories incorporated into the Reich, education in Polish was banned and punished with death. Throughout Polish territory, the Germans abolished all university education for non-Germans. All institutions of higher education were closed. Their equipment and most of the laboratories were taken to Germany and divided among the German universities while the buildings were turned into offices and military barracks.

There existed however the Staatliche Kunstgewerbeschule Krakau, which educated many Polish artists. It inspired also a number of theater creators cooperating with Tadeusz Kantor.

== Resistance: the underground education ==
However, many teachers, professors and educational activists organized underground courses all around the country, reviving the tradition of Flying University from the times of partition of Poland. Those who survived the A-B Aktion and were not sent to concentration camps actively lectured to small groups in private apartments. The attendants were constantly risking deportation and death.

Most of the underground education was organized by the Secret Teaching Organization (Tajna Organizacja Nauczycielska, TON), which took care of the underground primary and secondary level education. Norman Davies notes that the Organization undertook the education of a million children. By 1942, about 1,500,000 students took part in underground primary education; in 1944, the clandestine secondary school system covered 100,000 people and the secret university level courses about 10,000.

The net of underground university faculties spread rapidly and by 1944 there were more than 300 lecturers and 3,500 students at various courses at the Warsaw University alone. Underground Law and Social Sciences faculties, as well as Humanities, Medical, Theological, Mathematical and Biology faculties were kept alive at Stefan Batory University in Wilno (now Vilnius) from 1939 until 1944 with lectures, seminars and exams.

The main universities included the University of Lwów, Warsaw University, Stefan Batory University in Wilno and Jagiellonian University in Kraków. A new University of Western Lands (Uniwersytet Ziem Zachodnich) was created in Warsaw, with branches in Kielce, Jędrzejów, Częstochowa and Milanówek. The latter university was composed mostly of the professors of Adam Mickiewicz University of Poznań and included 17 different units, among them the faculty of medicine and surgery.

Almost 10,000 students received master's degrees at the secret universities and several hundred others received doctorates. Secret printing houses that sprang up across Poland shortly after the war started, provided the facilities of secret learning with handbooks and scripts.

The professors organized a net of secret high schools, trade schools and special courses on forbidden subjects, such as the Polish language, history and geography. A special case were the secret talmudic schools organized in ghettos. Until 1944 there were more than a million secret high school students in Poland. At least 18,000 students passed their final school exams and received their certificates. This led to a bizarre situation in which students of formally non-existent high schools entered formally non-existent universities. Most of these certificates were issued on pre-war forms with the dates forged to indicate either 1938 or 1939. These were later accepted by post-war Polish universities.

There was also a net of secret military colleges in most major cities. Until 1944, most of Armia Krajowa regiments had their military schools for Non-commissioned officers (NCOs) while the regional headquarters organized officer courses and special training. The Szare Szeregi (the underground Polish Scouting Association) opened its own NCO school in Warsaw nicknamed Agricola.

Religious education and training also took place. Prominently, the Roman Catholic Church operated underground seminaries for the education of priests. One well-known seminary was run by the Archbishop of Kraków, Cardinal Sapieha and trained future Cardinal and Pope, John Paul II (Karol Wojtyla).

== Underground-university lecturers ==
This is a partial list of professors who risked their lives teaching under the Nazi and Soviet occupations. Dates of death are given for those executed for their teaching activities.

=== Warsaw ===
- Stefan Bryła, engineering (d. 1943)
- Eugeniusz Lokajski, sports (d.1944 - Warsaw Uprising)
- Marceli Handelsman, history (d.1945)
- Kazimierz Kuratowski, mathematics
- Tadeusz Manteuffel, history
- Andrzej Mostowski, mathematics
- Kazimierz Iwiński, Polish language
- Zygmunt Szweykowski, history
- Władysław Tatarkiewicz, history of philosophy, history of aesthetics, history of art
- Jan Łukasiewicz, logic and philosophy

=== Kraków ===
- Władysław Czapliński, history
- Marian Gieszczykiewicz, biology (d.1942)
- Mieczysław Małecki, linguistics (responsible for organizing much of Kraków's underground education)
- Konstanty Troczyński, literature (d.1942)
- Adam Stefan Sapieha, theology
- Władysław Ślebodziński, mathematics
- Wisława Szymborska, poet

=== Lwów ===
- Stefan Inglot, historian (imprisoned, but not executed)

=== Wilno ===
- Iwo Jaworski - law
- Kazimierz Petrusewicz - law
- Bronisław Wróblewski - law
- Stefan Ehrenkreutz

=== Others ===
- Franciszek Leja, history, Łańcut, Leżajsk
- Tadeusz Strumiłło

== Underground-university students ==
These are some notable underground-university students:

- Adam Bielański, chemist, Jagiellonian University professor, member of the Polish Academy of Sciences, Kraków
- Andrzej Maria Deskur, Roman Catholic cardinal, Kraków
- Zbigniew Herbert, poet, Kraków
- Tadeusz Konwicki, writer, film director, Wilno
- Karol Józef Wojtyła (Pope John Paul II), Kraków

== Ukrainian education ==
Ukrainian education in occupied Poland was more developed than before the war.
