= Andrzej Borodzik =

Polish chemist (1930–2021)

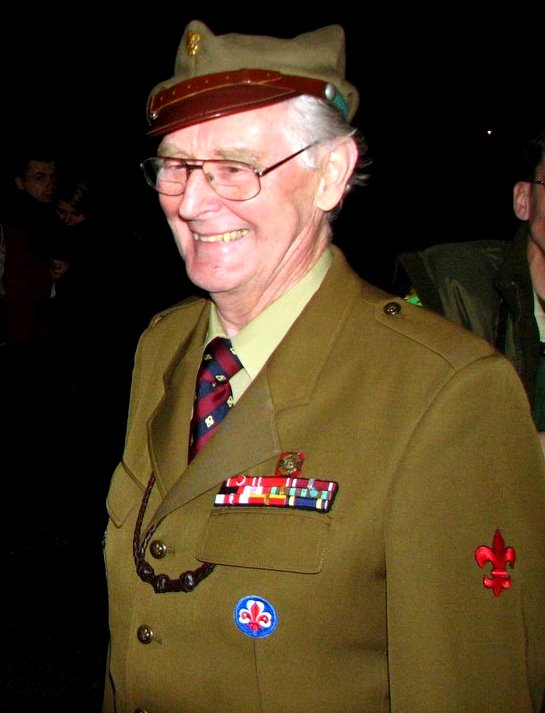
Andrzej Borodzik

Andrzej Borodzik (Polish pronunciation: [an.dʐɛj bɔrɔd͡ʑik]; 9 April 1930 – 13 August 2021) was a Polish chemist and scout leader and politician who served in the Sejm. Borodzik served as president of the Polish Scouting and Guiding Association from 2005 to 2007. He was born in Sulejówek, Poland.
