= Chief Scout's Award =

The Chief Scout's Award or Chief Scout Award is a Scouting award issued by several national Scouting organizations:

- Chief Scout's Award (Scouts Canada)
- Chief Scout Award (Scouting Ireland) which replaced the
  - Chief Scout's Award (Scouting Ireland) c.2011
- The Chief Scout's Acorn, Bronze, Silver, Gold, Platinum and Diamond Awards, part of the Scout Association's Award Scheme in the United Kingdom
