= Chief scout =

A chief scout is the principal or head scout for a military unit, colonial administration or an exploration expedition or the head adult of some organizations in the Scout Movement or, in performing or creative arts, particularly sport, the term may refer to an organization's senior talent scout.

Historically, a chief scout or chief of scouts was the person in charge of intelligence and reconnaissance in the English Navy and armies or for expeditions. The title was popularly used in colonies or frontiers such as in the Americas and southern Africa during the colonial period although the title dates back as far as English Civil War. Frederick Russell Burnham, was chief scout of the British South Africa Company and chief of scouts to Field Marshal Lord Roberts during the Boer War.

== In Sport ==
In sport, a chief scout can be the principal talent scout seeking new players or a tactical scout.

== In the Scout Movement ==
Following the popular development of the boy and girl Scout Movement around 1907, emulating frontier scouts, a number of organizations formed, with chief scouts as their heads. Later, Robert Baden-Powell formed his Boy Scouts Association in 1910 and made himself The Boy Scouts Association's Chief Scout and chairman for life, holding both positions until his death in 1941. As part of the arranged closing ceremony of the 1st World Scout Jamboree, run by Baden-Powell's organization in 1920, his organization proclaimed him to be Chief Scout of the World. Use of the title Chief Scout of the World lapsed after his death in 1941.

Some organizations in the Scout Movement, such as The Scout Association in the United Kingdom and Scouts Ireland and one Polish Scout organization still use the title Chief Scout for the head uniformed official of their organization. Some branches of The Scout Association, such as Scouts Australia and Scouts Aotearoa, have appointed the Governor-General of Australia and Governor-General of New Zealand respectively as their organization's Chief Scout. The Scout Association's Scouts Canada branch and Scouts Victoria branch have used popular figures like survival expert, filmmaker and musician Les Stroud and actor Shane Jacobson in efforts to promote their organizations to wider audiences. In both scenarios the Chief Scout performs ceremonial functions while the day-to-day operation of the organizations is headed by another official, often known as a Chief Commissioner.

== See also ==
- Chief Scout's Award
- Chief Scout Executive for a similar position in the Boy Scouts of America
