= Kazimierz Iwiński =

Polish actor

Kazimierz Iwiński (14 September 1918 - 21 October 2012) was a Polish theatre and film actor.
