= Ranks in Polish Scouting =

Ranks in Polish Scouting are common to the majority of Scouting organisations in Poland, including the two most popular organisations. However, the exact system used is usually left to the discretion of individual groups. Some groups may only grant a subset of these ranks, whereas others may use different names for an equivalent rank.

Although Polish Scouting's customs and attire follow closely those of the military, the uniforms used may vary. For example, some uniforms do not have shoulder straps, whereas other groups recently introduced a chevron system.

== Rank insignia ==
=== Scouts ===
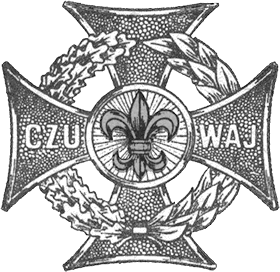
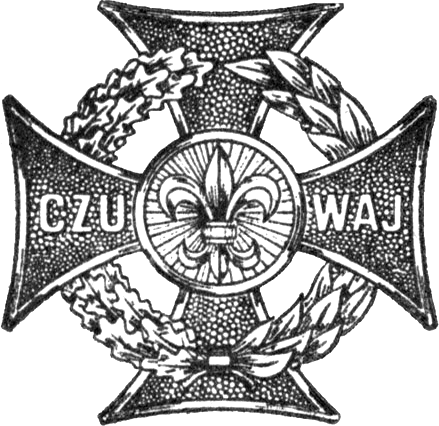
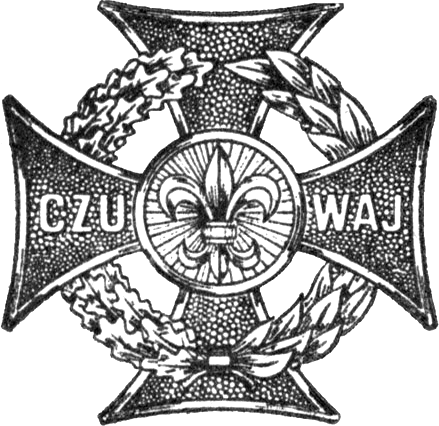
Scout shoulder mark
Sea Scout shoulder mark
Scouting cross
Boys	Harcerz; Rzeczypospolitej (HR)	Harcerz Orli (HO)	Ćwik (ćw.)	Odkrywca (odkr.)	Wywiadowca (wyw.)	Młodzik (mł.)
Girls	Harcerka; Rzeczypospolitej (HR)	Harcerka Orla (HO)	Samarytanka (sam.)	Pionierka (pion.)	Tropicielka (trop.)	Ochotniczka (och.)
	Scout of the Republic of Poland	Eagle Scout	Fourth	Discoverer or pioneer	Scout	Youngster

=== Scout instructors ===
Shoulder mark
Scouting cross
Men	Harcmistrz	Podharcmistrz	Przewodnik
Women	Harcmistrzyni	Podharcmistrzyni	Przewodniczka
	hm.	phm.	pwd.
	Scoutmaster	Sub-Scoutmaster	Guide or leader

== Guide or leader ==
Guide or leader
Przewodnik, Przewodniczka, pwd.

A Guide or Leader (Polish male form: przewodnik, female form: przewodniczka, short: pwd.) is the lowest rank of adult instructor common to most organisations within Polish scouting. Generally Guides wear a navy blue felt tee under the Scouting Cross as well as a navy blue chevron in the shape of a Fleur-de-lis worn on the left sleeve of their Scout uniform (a so-called instructor's Fleur-de-lis). Until World War II Polish Scouts used the title drużynowy po próbie (short: DPP; en. team leader after examination) in place of Guide.

During the PRL the ZHP (Polish Scouting Association) introduced a lower instructor rank, organizer. This rank still exists today in the Independent Scouts Instructor Sphere "Nursery-Garden" organisation of scouting.

== Organizer ==
Organizer
Organizator
org.

Organizer was the lowest rank in Polish scouting. It was introduced during Polish People's Republic. Signed with white felt tee under the Scouting Cross. People having this rank were usually new-nominated team leaders in Scout Service for Socialistic Poland and teachers. "Organizer" had been functioning by 1980, in 1982 this rank was abolished.

Rank of "Organizer" has been still functioning in Independent Scouts Instructor Sphere "Nursery-Garden". This rank is allocated to underages.

== Polish Scouting and Guiding Association (ZHP) ==
=== Methodology ===
According to the ZHP, a Guide (Leader) should be a role model, show leadership among their peers, and enjoy working with children and young adults. Guides should apply the Scouts' educational method to aid their leadership and should aim to promote cooperation. A Guide should also actively help with other leaders within their District. The ZHP states that being a Guide is rewarding, and helps Guides learn about themselves and their motivations.

=== Requirements to be an Instructor ===
- Taking the Scout Oath.
- Submitting a satisfactory plan to complete the Instructor Ranks Commission instructor challenge. This is to ensure that completion of the challenge is feasible.
- Be at least 16 years of age.

=== Requirements of becoming an instructor ===
The candidate must:

1. Demonstrate the compatibility of his/her personality with the Scout Law, and must have created and consequently realised the plan of his/her development.
2. Deepen his/her knowledge and develop his/her interests.
3. Maintain well-balanced involvement in their duties for various social groups (family, school, scout troop, employment)
4. Finish a Guide course.
5. Have a good track record of consistent service to his/her scouting community.
6. Be able to take part in a detached life.
7. Make use of Scout literature and Scout media.
8. Demonstrate that, in the past year they have developed skills in being able to teach children and young people of their chosen age groups (Cub Scouts, Scouts etc.), including the skills of:

- using methodical instruments
- practising the system of small groups
- creating a working plan, submitting said plan, and putting the plan into practice.

A Guide also must have participated in:

- organization of departure works' forms
- development of measures for the proper functioning of a Troop / Pack
- organization of camps for Troops /Packs, where the candidate performed in a leadership capacity
- administering documentation essential for Troop's / Pack's proper functioning
- cooperating with and coordinating between his/her Scout environment, parents, and school

=== Conditions of the end of instructor challenge ===
1. Gaining an appropriate level of development as described in the Rank Idea and finishing all tasks of instructor challenge.
2. Following regulations about safety in working with children and youth.
3. Having knowledge and skills at or above the level of Eagle Scout.
4. Completing a first aid course lasting a minimum of 15 hours.
5. Positively evaluated service during the time of instructor challenge.

=== Guide authorizations ===
Someone who is a Guide can:

- receive the Cub Scout and Brownie Oath and the Scout Oath in the name of ZHP
- serve as a Scout Instructor
- become a candidate for Scout authorities and act in these capacities (except the commandant of banner, Presidents of the Polish Scouting and Guiding Association, Chief Scouts of the Polish Scouting and Guiding Association, members of Scouts courts (who can be only Scoutmasters) and commandants of Groups (who can be only Scoutmasters and Sub-Scoutmasters)
- be awarded the Brown Cross of "Merit for ZHP"
- be a counselor without needing to first finish the course to become a counselor.

== Scouting Association of the Republic (Poland) (ZHR) ==
The rank of Guide is the lowest instructor rank in ZHR.

== See also ==
- Polish Armed Forces rank insignia
