= Grey Ranks =

Codename for the underground paramilitary Polish Scouting Association during World War II

- Szare Szeregi
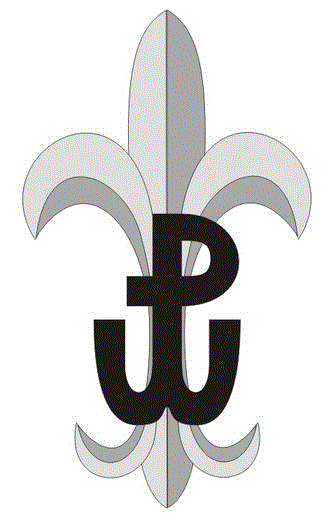
- Leader: Florian Marciniak
- Dates active: September 27, 1939–January 18, 1945
- Country: General government
- Allegiance: Polish Underground State

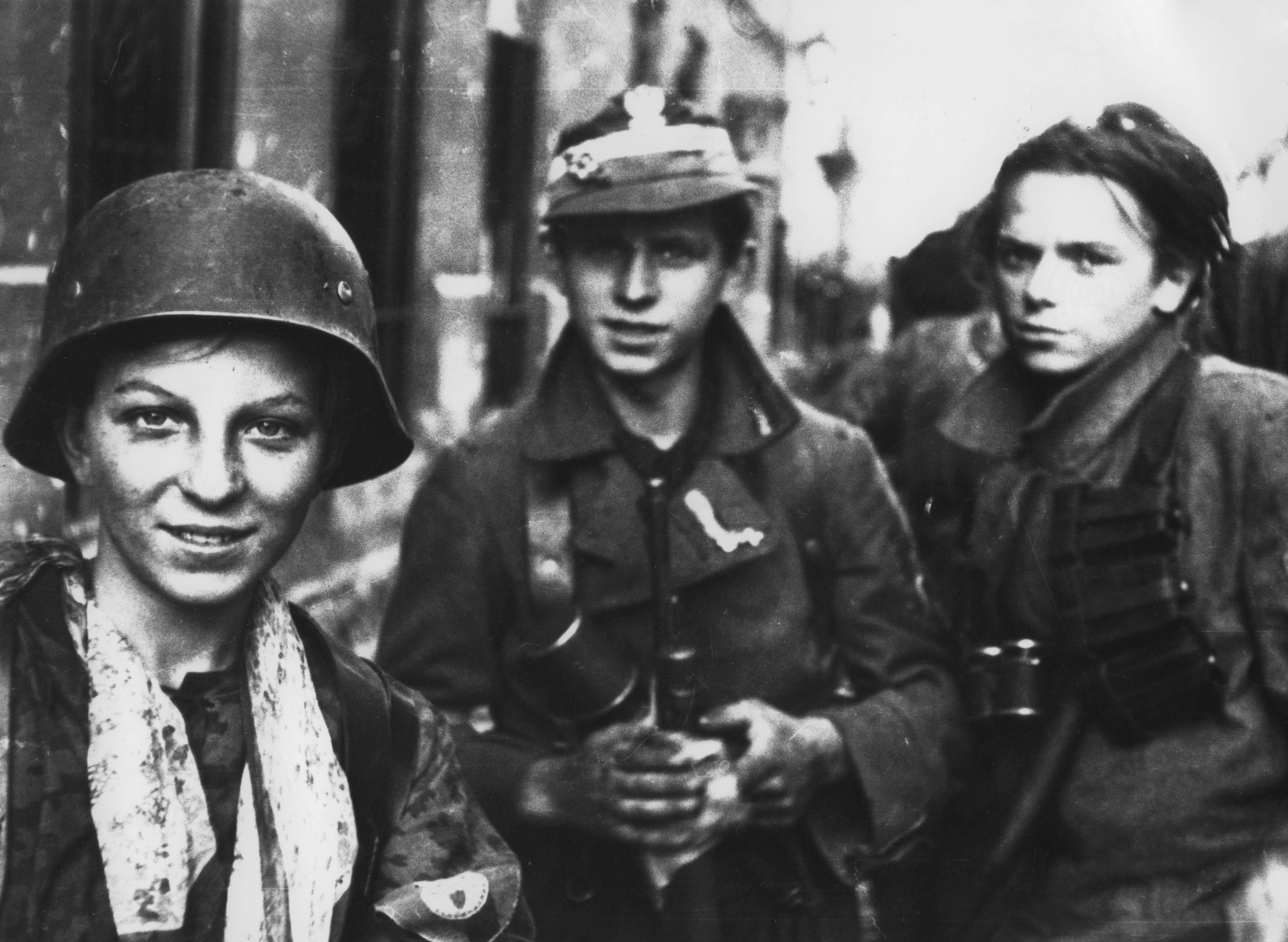
Polish Boy Scouts fighting in the Warsaw Uprising

Grey Ranks (Polish: Szare Szeregi) was a codename for the underground paramilitary Polish Scouting Association (Związek Harcerstwa Polskiego) during World War II.

The wartime organisation was created on 27 September 1939, actively resisted and fought German occupation in Warsaw until 18 January 1945, and contributed to the resistance operations of the Polish Underground State. Some of its members (Grupy Szturmowe – Assault Groups) were among the Home Army's best-trained troops.

Though formally independent, the Grey Ranks worked closely with the Government Delegation for Poland and Home Army Headquarters. The Grey Ranks had their own headquarters known under the cryptonym Pasieka (bee yard) staffed by the Chief Scout of Grey Ranks plus three to five deputies in the rank of Harcmistrz (Scoutmaster).

== Overview ==
Since its organization in 1916, scouts from the Polish Scouting and Guiding Association (Związek Harcerstwa Polskiego (ZHP)) had taken an active part in all the conflicts Poland was engaged in around this time: Great Poland Uprising, Polish-Bolshevik War, Silesian Uprisings, and the Polish–Ukrainian War. After the German Invasion of Poland in 1939, the Nazis recognized the ZHP as a threat. Polish Scouts and Guides were branded as criminals and banned.

Under the leadership of Florian Marciniak, the ZHP carried on as a clandestine organization. The wartime Scouts evolved into the paramilitary Szare Szeregi (Grey Ranks), reporting up through the Polish underground state and the Home Army resistance organization.

The codename Szare Szeregi was adopted in 1940. It was first used by underground scouting in Poznań. The name was coined after an early action of the Polish Scouting Association, in which boy scouts distributed propaganda leaflets among Germans from Lithuania, Latvia and Estonia who had settled in the homes of Poles expelled to the General Government. To create confusion, the leaflets had been signed SS — later expanded to Szare Szeregi, a name that came to be adopted by the entire organization.

Older Scouts carried out sabotage, armed resistance, and assassinations. The Girl Guides formed auxiliary units working as nurses, liaisons and munition carriers. Younger Scouts were involved in so-called minor sabotage under the auspice of the Wawer organization, which included dropping leaflets or painting the kotwica sign on the walls. During Operation Tempest, and especially during the Warsaw Uprising, the Scouts participated in the fighting, and several Szare Szeregi units were some of the most effective in combat. The Grey Ranks also included the White Couriers, who, between late fall 1939 and mid-1940, helped smuggle many persons out of Soviet-occupied southeastern Poland into Hungary.

In 1940, the Soviet Union executed most of the Boy Scouts held at Ostashkov prison.

In 1945 the ZHP restored its former name and returned to public existence. However, the communist authorities of Poland pressured the organization to become a member of the Pioneer Movement and eventually it was banned in 1949. The only existing part of the pre-war ZHP during the years of the Communist regime was the ZHP pgK ('ZHP abroad', consisting of Polish Scouts from the USA, UK, Canada, Australia, Argentina, France and Sweden).

== Principles ==
The Grey Ranks followed the prewar principles of the Polish Scouting Association: service to the people and country, and education and improvement of their skills. In addition to the prewar oath, the following line was added:

"I pledge to you that I shall serve with the Grey Ranks, safeguard the secrets of the organization, obey orders, and not hesitate to sacrifice my life."

In addition to the Scouting moral code, the Grey Ranks also followed a basic three-step path of action. The program was nicknamed Dziś - jutro - pojutrze (Today - tomorrow - the day after):

- Today – struggle for Poland's independence
- Tomorrow – prepare for an all-national uprising and the liberation of Poland
- The Day After – prepare to rebuild Poland after the war

== Structure ==
The Grey Ranks' structure was based on the prewar structure of the Polish Scouting Association, modified to suit the new circumstances of occupation and repression. The basic unit was the troop (drużyna), comprising some 20 boys or girls. Each troop was composed of several squads (zastępy), each zastęp comprising 7 persons. Several troops from a specified area (city district, village or town) formed a district (hufiec), which in turn formed part of a region (chorągiew — lit. a banner or standard). During World War II, the several units were referred to by their own code-names:

- banner (chorągiew) – ul (beehive)
- district (hufiec) – rój (swarm)
- troop (drużyna) – rodzina (family)
- squad (zastęp) – pszczoły (bees)

The headquarters of the Gray Ranks were code-named Bee Yard (Pasieka), headed by the commander (Naczelnik). The Grey Ranks' successive commanders were:

- Florian Marciniak (27 September 1939 – 6 May 1943)
- Stanisław Broniewski ("Orsza"; 12 May 1943 – 3 October 1944)
- Leon Marszałek (3 October 1944 – 18 January 1945)

At the apogee of the Grey Ranks' strength, Headquarters commanded 20 banners. To control the movement, the area of prewar Poland was divided into departments, each supervising several banners:

- Western Department (Wydział Zachodni, Z) – areas annexed by Nazi Germany:
  - Pomeranian banner – ul "Lina" (beehive Line)
  - Greater Polish – ul "Przemysław" (beehive Przemysław)
  - Łódź – ul "Kominy" (beehive Chimneys)
  - Zagłębie – ul "Barbara" (beehive Barbara)
  - Silesian – ul "Huta" (beehive Steel mill)

An additional banner was formed in the General Government and commanded all the scouts from Greater Poland expelled from their homes by the Germans (ul "Chrobry" - beehive Chrobry).

- Eastern Department (Wydział Wschodni, W) – eastern voivodeships of Poland
  - Białystok – ul "Biały" (beehive White)
  - Wilno – ul "Brama" (beehive Gate)
  - Polesie – ul "Błota" (beehive Marshes)
  - Nowogródek – ul "Las" (beehive Forest)
  - Wołyń – ul "Gleba" (beehive Soil)

An additional banner was formed for scouts expelled from their homes to the General Government (ul Złoty – "Gold beehive").

- Central Poland Department (Wydział Polski Centralnej, C)
  - Warsaw – ul "Wisła" (beehive Vistula)
  - Masovian – ul "Puszcza" (beehive Wilderness)
  - Radom – ul "Rady" (beehive Councils)
  - Lublin – ul "Zboże" (beehive Grain)
- Southern Poland Department (Wydział Polski Południowej, P)
  - Kielce – ul "Skała" (beehive Rock)
  - Częstochowa – ul "Warta" (beehive Warta)
  - Kraków – ul "Smok" (beehive Dragon)
- Lwów – ul "Lew" (beehive Lion)

Coordination among the departments and beehives was directed by inspectors subordinate to the Headquarters: Eugeniusz Stasiecki, Edward Zurn and Kazimierz Grenda.

== Ranks by age ==
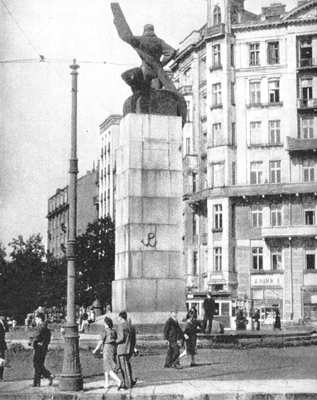
The Kotwica sign, painted by Grey Ranks on pedestal of the 1932 Warsaw Aviator Monument

As of 1 May 1944, the Grey Ranks numbered 8,359 members. Initially, only older scouts (Senior Scouts, Senior Guides, Rovers and Rangers), aged 17 and up, were admitted. Soon, however, younger children were admitted, and in 1942 a new structure was adopted, based largely on the prewar structure of the Polish Scouting Association.

=== Zawisza ===
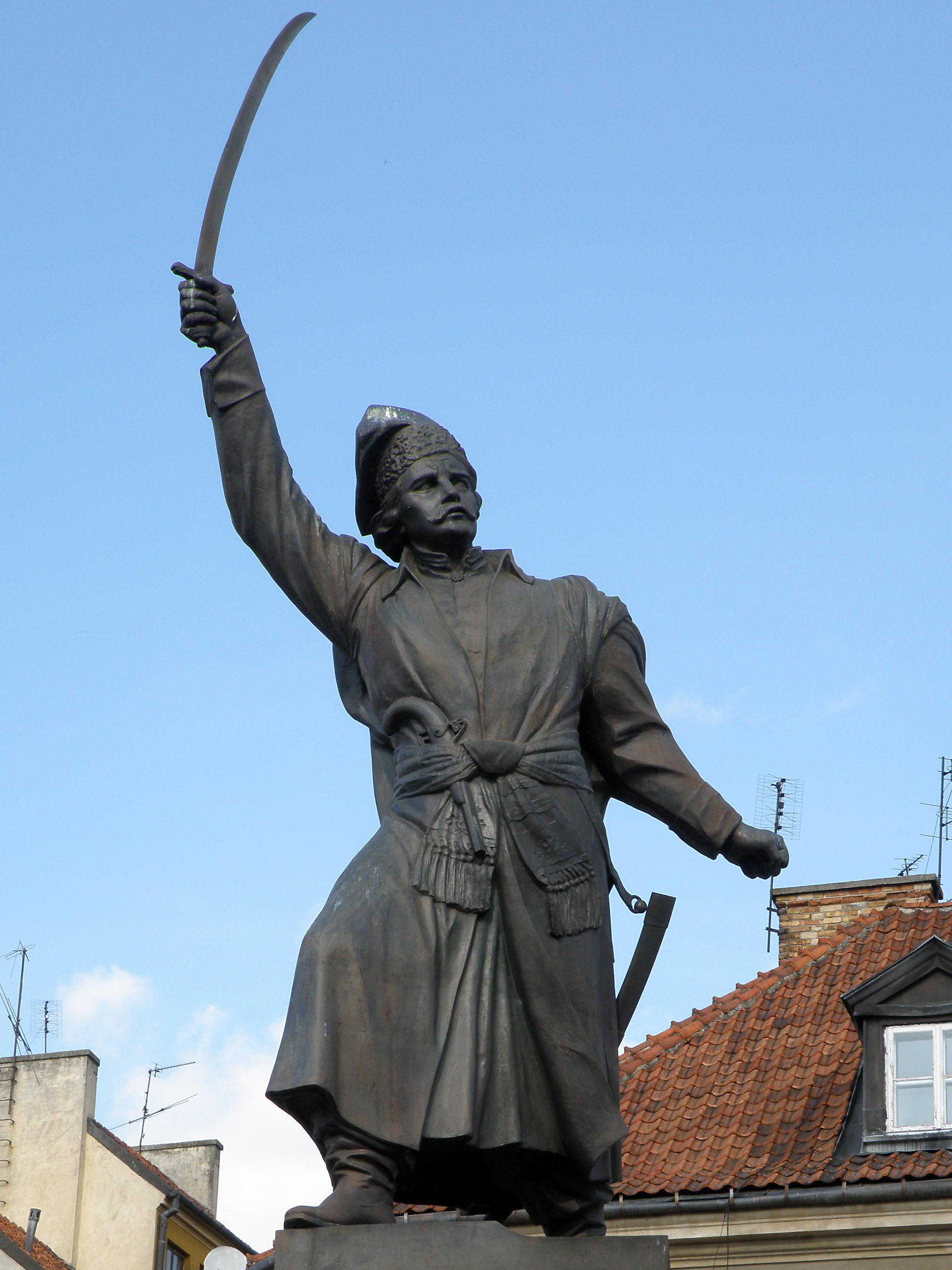
Jan Kiliński statue

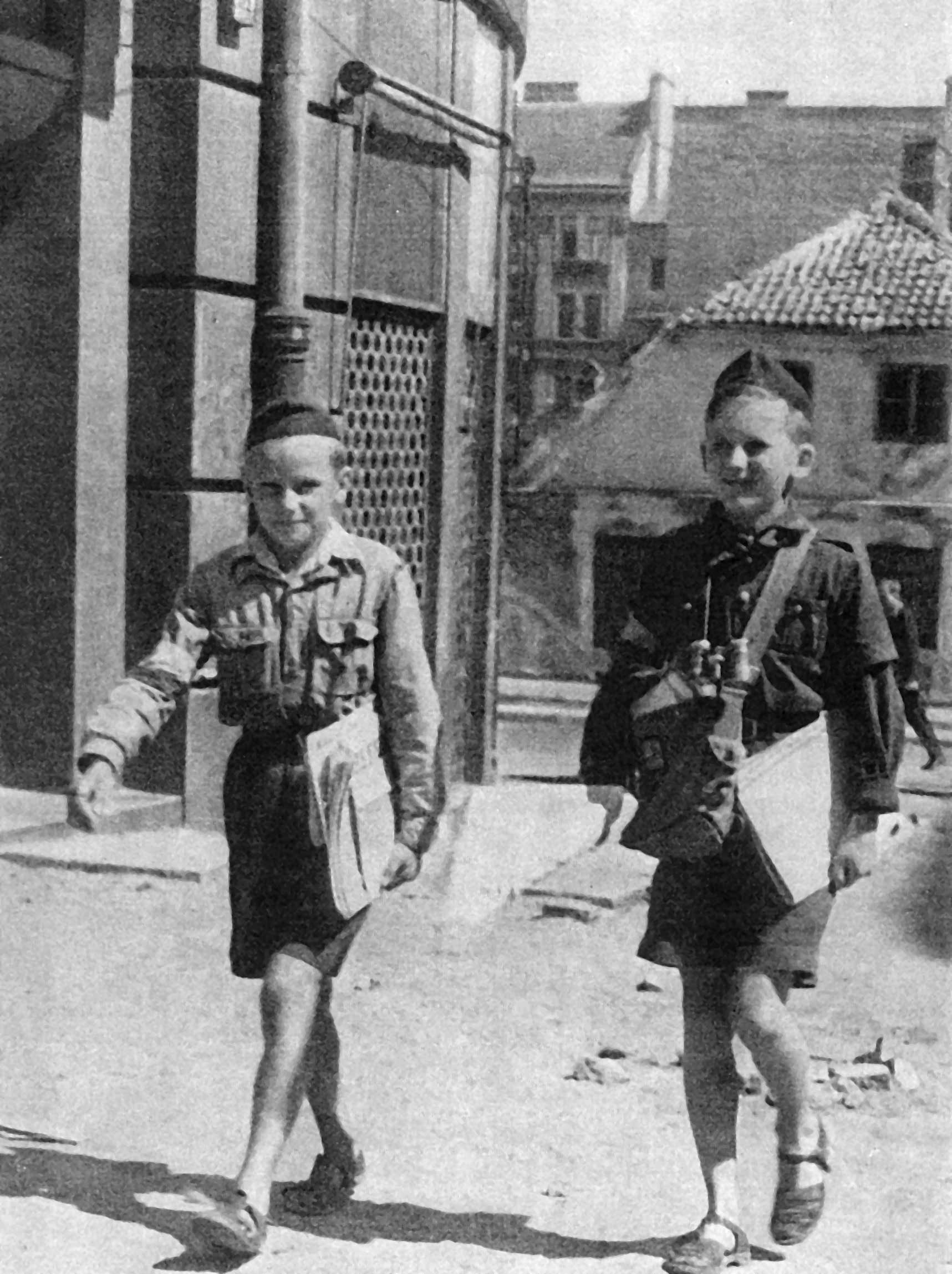
Postmen during the Warsaw Uprising

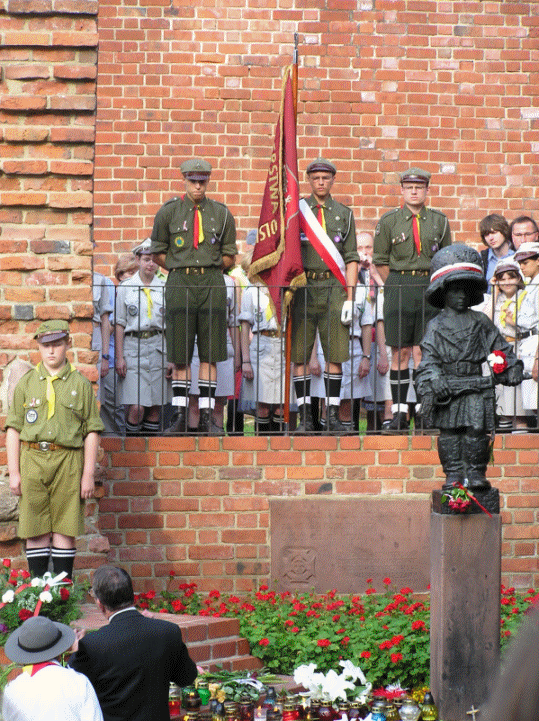
Monument to Mały Powstaniec (Little partisan) in Warsaw, erected to commemorate all the children that fought and fell in the Warsaw Uprising

Zawisza (plural Zawiszacy) was a group of the youngest Scouts of the Szare Szeregi.

Troops organised for children between 12 and 14 years of age were code-named Zawisza, after Zawisza Czarny, a medieval Polish knight and diplomat. The troops did not take part in active resistance. Instead, the children were prepared for auxiliary service for the upcoming all-national uprising and taught in secret schools for their future duties in liberated Poland. Among the best-known auxiliary troops formed by the Zawiszacy was the Scouting Postal Service organised during the Warsaw Uprising.

=== Combat Schools ===
The Combat Schools (Bojowe Szkoły) comprised youngsters aged 15 to 17. They took part in "small-sabotage" operations. These included propaganda operations directed at the Poles, German civilians and German military units. The best-known operations were:

- Operation Wawer-Palmiry – a major propaganda campaign which included painting patriotic and anti-German slogans on walls (see also kotwica); distribution of leaflets, posters stickers, and fake issues of supposed German newspapers; intercepting German propaganda megaphones and using them to spread Polish propaganda; destroying German flags and other symbols; disrupting German events by setting off fire alarms; and, last but not least, stink-bombing German-operated movie theaters. Probably the best-known action was the removal of a German-language plaque that had been attached by the Germans to the Nicolaus Copernicus Monument in Warsaw, claiming the astronomer for the German nation, by Maciej Aleksy Dawidowski.
- Operation N – the distribution of propaganda newspapers and leaflets among German soldiers stationed in Poland.
- Operation WISS (Wywiad – Informacja Szarych Szeregów, Grey Ranks Intelligence)—an operation on behalf of Home Army intelligence, in which Combat Schools groups carried out surveillance of German military units and their movements. The information that was gathered was passed on to the Allies. The operation provided the Allies with complete lists of German units, their insignia and approximate complements, including units down to battalion size.

Other famous operations included marking street lamps as Nur für Deutsche (Only for Germans), implying that those who hanged people would themselves be hanged (from street lamps). Other operations occurred after the Germans began destroying monuments to Polish national heroes and historical personalities. These included a monument to Jan Kiliński, leader of an 18th-century Warsaw uprising against the Russians during the Kościuszko Uprising. The Germans dismantled the monument and placed it in the cellars of the former National Museum, for delivery to a German steel mill. The scouts were notified of where the monument was hidden and overnight marked the walls of the former museum, "People of Warsaw! I am here. Kiliński".

As part of their secret training, the Combat Schools boys and girls prepared for service with the Home Army as members of commanders' troops, communication units, and reconnaissance units. During the Warsaw Uprising, Combat Schools units in Warsaw's Downtown District formed a company; in other districts, they formed platoons.

=== Assault groups ===
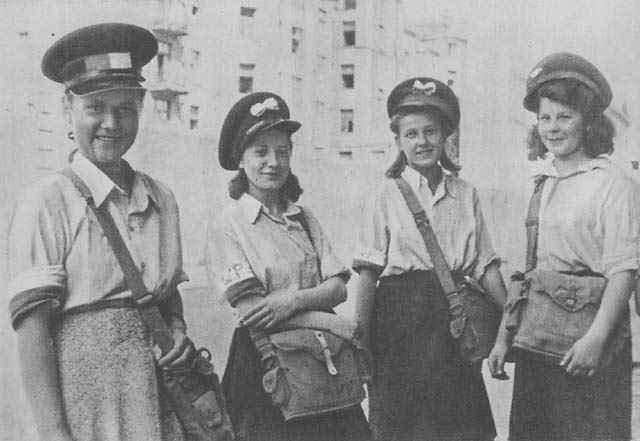
Girl-guide postal workers during Warsaw Uprising

The Assault Groups (Grupy Szturmowe), comprising youngsters aged 17 and up, were directly subordinate to the Home Army's KeDyw (Directorate of Diversion). The groups trained at secret NCO schools and officer schools for commanders of motorised and engineering units. Most members also studied at underground universities, to gain the knowledge necessary to reconstruct Poland after the war. The best-known NCO schools included Warsaw's Agricola.

The assault groups took part in "major sabotage", including armed struggle against the occupiers. The assault groups formed the backbone of the Home Army's special troops. They liberated prisoners from German prisons and transports, blew up railroad bridges, carried out executions ordered by special courts, and fought pitched battles against German forces.

The assault groups in Warsaw were organised into several battalions, including the famous Baszta, Zośka, "Parasol" and Wigry, which later took part in the Warsaw Uprising and were among the most notable and successful units on the Polish side. Other units, mainly in the Radom-Kielce area, joined the partisan units operating in the forests of the Świętokrzyskie Mountains.

== Assault-group operations ==
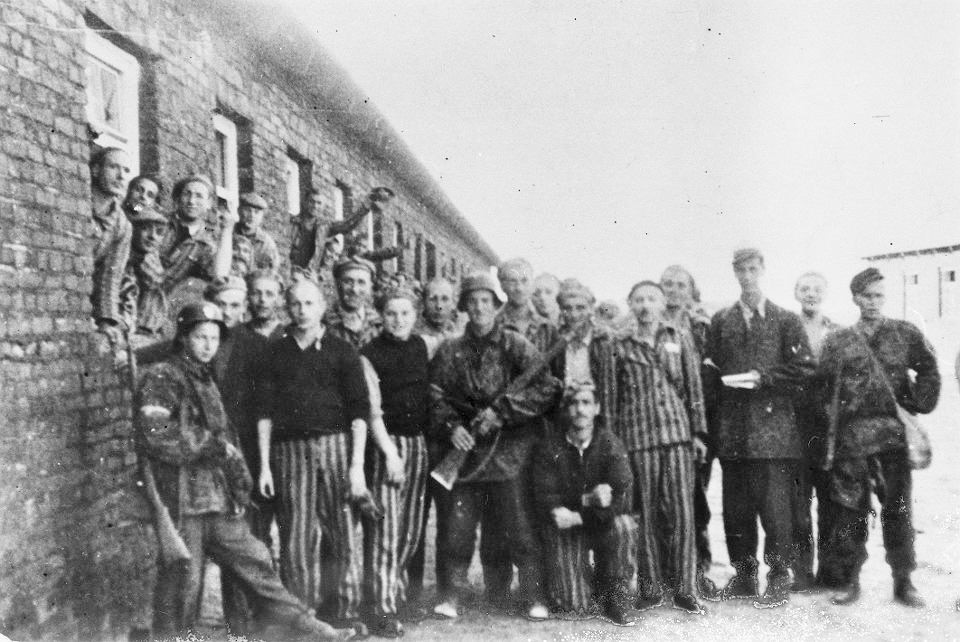
Gęsiówka inmates and "Zośka"-battalion assault-group soldiers after the camp's liberation

Notable assault-group operations included:

- Operation Arsenal (March 26, 1943), the liberation of the gravely wounded Jan Bytnar and 24 other prisoners from a Gestapo convoy
- Operation Schultz (May 6, 1943), the assassination of SS-Obersturmführer Herbert Schultz
- Operation Lange (May 22, 1943), the assassination of SS-Rottenführer Ewald Lange
- Operation Belt (August 1943 – February 1944), the destruction of thirteen German border outposts
- Operation Bürkl (September 7, 1943), the assassination of SS-Oberscharführer Franz Bürkl
- Operation Kutschera (February 2, 1944), the assassination of SS and Police Leader Franz Kutschera
- Storming and liberation of Gęsiówka concentration camp in Warsaw (August 5, 1944)

== See also ==
- Children in the military
- Czarne Szeregi
- Mury
