= List of World War II military operations =

This is a list of known World War II era codenames for military operations and missions commonly associated with World War II. As of 2022 this is not a comprehensive list, but most major operations that Axis and Allied combatants engaged in are included, and also operations that involved neutral nation states. Operations are categorised according to the theater of operations, and an attempt has been made to cover all aspects of significant events. Operations contained in the Western Front category have been listed by year. Operations that follow the cessation of hostilities and those that occurred in the pre-war period are also included. Operations are listed alphabetically, and where multiple aspects are involved these are listed inline.

Flags used are those of the time period.

== Africa ==
Excludes North African campaigns

- Chronometer (1941) (United Kingdom) (British Raj) – Anglo-Indian capture of Assab
- Composition (1941) (United Kingdom) – FAA attack on Massawa
- Ironclad (1942) (United Kingdom) (Union of South Africa) – Allied lindings on Madagascar
- Streamline Jane (1942) (United Kingdom) (Union of South Africa) – ground campaign on Madagascar
- Menace (1940) (United Kingdom) (Free France) – seaborne Free French and British attack on Dakar, French West Africa (Senegal)
- Postmaster (1942) (United Kingdom) – SOE operation to capture three Axis vessels in the neutral Spanish island of Fernando Po
- Supply (1941) (United Kingdom) – Allied anti-submarine naval patrol off Madagascar

== Atlantic Ocean ==
Includes North Sea and Arctic Ocean operations and actions against naval vessels in harbour

- Alacrity (1943) (United Kingdom) – Allied naval patrols around Azores
- Berlin (1941) (Nazi Germany) – Atlantic cruise of Scharnhorst and Gneisenau
- Catechism (1944) (United Kingdom) – final RAF air attack on Tirpitz
- Cerberus (1942) (Nazi Germany) – escape of German capital ships from Brest to home ports in Germany (Channel Dash)
- Croquet (1944) (United Kingdom) – Allied anti-shipping off Norway
- Cupola (1945) (United Kingdom) – British anti-shipping operation off Norway
- Deadlight (1945) (United Kingdom) – postwar scuttling of U-boats
- Dervish (1941) (United Kingdom) – first of the Arctic Convoys to the Soviet Union
- Domino (1943) (Nazi Germany) – second aborted Arctic sortie by Scharnhorst, Prinz Eugen and destroyers
- Doppelschlag ("Double blow") (1942) (Nazi Germany) – German anti-shipping operation off Novaya Zemlya by Admiral Scheer and Admiral Hipper
- Drachenhöhle (1944) (Nazi Germany) – aborted attack on Home Fleet at Scapa Flow, using Mistel composite aircraft
- Drumbeat (1942) (Nazi Germany) – part of "Second Happy Time" (Paukenschlag)
- EJ (1941) (United Kingdom) – British anti-shipping operation off Norway
- Enclose (1943) (United Kingdom) – British anti-submarine air offensive in Bay of Biscay (also Enclose II)
- Foxchase (1945) (United Kingdom) – British anti-shipping operation off Norway
- Fronttheater (1943) (Nazi Germany) – first aborted Arctic sortie by Scharnhorst, Prinz Eugen and destroyers
- Goodwood I, II, III and IV (1944) (United Kingdom) – sequence of 4 carrier-borne air attacks on Tirpitz
- Holder (1943) (United Kingdom) – British special naval transport to Murmansk
- Husar (1943) (Nazi Germany) – cancelled German anti-shipping operation in Kara Sea by Lutzow
- Leader (1943) (United States) (United Kingdom) – antishipping operation off Norway by USS Ranger
- Lucid (1940) (United Kingdom) – attempt to destroy German invasion barges
- Mascot (1944) (United Kingdom) – failed carrier-borne air attack on Tirpitz
- Nordseetour ("North Sea Tour") (1940) (Nazi Germany) – first Atlantic operation of Admiral Hipper
- Obviate (1944) (United Kingdom) – RAF air attack on Tirpitz
- Ostfront (1943) (Nazi Germany) – final operation of Scharnhorst to intercept convoy JW 55B
- Paderborn (1943) (Nazi Germany) – third and successful transfer of Scharnhorst and destroyers to Norway
- Paravane (1944) (United Kingdom) – RAF air attack on Tirpitz
- Paukenschlag (Nazi Germany) ("Drumbeat", "Beat of the Kettle Drum", "Second happy time") (1942) – German U-boat campaign against shipping off the United States east coast
- Planet, Brawn and Tiger Claw (1944) (United Kingdom) – cancelled carrier-borne air attacks on the Tirpitz
- Posthorn (1944) (United Kingdom) – British naval air attack on shipping off Norway
- Potluck (1944) (United Kingdom) – Allied anti-shipping patrol off Norway
- Primrose (1941) (United Kingdom) – capture of U-110's Enigma cypher machine and documents by HMS Bulldog
- Regenbogen ("Rainbow") (1942) (Nazi Germany) Germany – failed German attack on Arctic convoy JW 51B, by Admiral Hipper and Lutzow
- Rheinübung ("Exercise Rhine") (1941) (Nazi Germany) Germany – planned German attacks on Allied shipping conducted by Bismarck and Prinz Eugen
- Rösselsprung ("Knights Move") (1942) (Nazi Germany) – German naval operation (including Tirpitz) to attack Arctic convoy PQ 17
- Roundel (1945) (United Kingdom) – British convoy escort to Murmansk
- Source (1943) (United Kingdom) – British X class submarine (midget submarine) attacks on German warships based in Norway
- Sportpalast (1942) (Nazi Germany) – aborted German naval operation (including Tirpitz) to attack Arctic convoys PQ-12 and QP-8
- Stonewall (1943) (United Kingdom) (New Zealand) (United States) (France) (Czechoslovakia) (Canada) – Allied operation to intercept blockade runners in the Bay of Biscay
- Teardrop (1945) (United States) – anti U-boat operation
- Tungsten (1944) (United Kingdom) – carrier-borne air attack on Tirpitz
- Tunnel (1943) (United Kingdom) – standard British plan to intercept German blockade runners
- Wikinger (1940) (Nazi Germany) – foray by German destroyers into the North Sea
- Wunderland (1942) (Nazi Germany) – German anti-shipping operation in Kara Sea by Admiral Scheer
- Zarin (1942) (Nazi Germany) – German mining action off Novaya Zemlya by Admiral Hipper and destroyers

== China ==
- Manchukuo (1931-1942) (Empire of Japan)
- Chongqing (1938-1943) (Empire of Japan)
- Mission 204 (1942–1944) (United Kingdom) (Australia)
- Sankō (1942–1944) (Empire of Japan) – Japanese campaign in five provinces of northeastern China to crush the Chinese resistance following the Hundred Regiments Offensive
- Sei-go (1942) (Empire of Japan)
- Gangnam (1943) (Empire of Japan)
- Ichi-Go (1944) (Empire of Japan) – Japanese campaign in eastern China to secure overland routes to Indo-China and airfields
  - TO (1942) (Empire of Japan) – plan to capture US airfields at Hengyang, Lingling, Lweilin and Liuchow
- Alpha (1944) (Republic of China (1912–1949)) (United States) – improvement of the defences of Kunming against Japanese threats
- Matterhorn (1944) (United States) – establishment of bases for US B-29 bomber aircraft

== South West, South, and South East Asia ==
Includes operations in Iraq, Syria, Iran, India, Burma, Malaya and Indo-China, and the Indian Ocean

- Anakim (1943) (United Kingdom) (United States) (Republic of China (1912–1949)) – proposed strategy to retake Burma and reopen the land route to China
- Bajadere (1942) (Nazi Germany) – Possibly Fictional German special forces operation in India, including Free India Legion personnel
- Balsam (1945) (United Kingdom) – photographic reconnaissance of southern Malaya and airstrikes against Sumatran airfields
- BAN (1943) (Japan) – defensive scheme for Mandalay and Meiktila
- Birdseed (1944) (British Raj) – anti-shipping raid against Ramree harbour area
- Boarding Party (1943) (British Raj) – raid against German ships interned in neutral port of Goa.
- Boomerang (1944) (United States) air raid on Palembang
- C (1942) (Empire of Japan) – major Japanese naval incursion into Indian Ocean
- Canned (1944) (United Kingdom) – search and destroy operation for German supply tanker
- Capital (1943) (United Kingdom) – Allied capture of northern Burma
- Cockpit (1944) (United Kingdom) (United States) (Free France) (Australia) (Netherlands) (New Zealand) – Allied naval airstrike on Sabang, Sumatra
- Operation Musketeer I, II, III (1944-1945) (United States) – American and Filipino campaign to defeat and expel the Imperial Japanese forces occupying the Philippines.
- Collie (1945) (United Kingdom) – naval airstrikes against the Nicobar Islands and air cover for minesweeping forces near Phuket Island
- Corkscrew (1944) (British Raj) – anti-shipping raid against Gwa area
- Countenance (1941) (United Kingdom) (British Raj) (Soviet Union) – Allied invasion of neutral Iran
  - Dover (1941) (United Kingdom) (British Raj) – occupation of Abadan
    - Crackler (1941) (United Kingdom) (British Raj) —
    - Marmalade (1941) (United Kingdom) (British Raj) —
    - Mopup (1941) (United Kingdom) (British Raj) —
    - Rapier (1941) (United Kingdom) (British Raj) —
  - Bishop (1941) (United Kingdom) (British Raj) – mopping up of Abadan Island
- Crimson (1944) (United Kingdom) (Free France) (Australia) (Netherlands) (New Zealand) – Allied naval airstrike and bombardment of Sabang, Sumatra
- Culverin (1943) (United Kingdom) – proposed allied invasion of northern Sumatra
- Curtain (1944) (British Raj) – naval bombardment of coast near Indin
- Dracula (1945) (United Kingdom) – British amphibious assault on Rangoon, Burma.
  - Bishop (1945) (United Kingdom) – covering operation for Dracula
- Diplomat (1944) (United Kingdom) (United States) (Australia) (Netherlands) (New Zealand) – Allied exercise in preparation for joint operations against the Japanese
- Dukedom (1945) (United Kingdom) – British search and destroy operation for Japanese cruiser Haguro
- Exporter (1941) (United Kingdom) (Australia) (British Raj) (Free France) – British and Commonwealth invasion of Vichy French-held Syria
- Foil (1945) (United Kingdom) – cutting of submarine telephone cables off Hong Kong
- Franz (1942) (Nazi Germany) – proposal to establish sabotage teams in Iran
- Ha-Go (1944) (Empire of Japan) – Japanese action to isolate and destroy Anglo-Indian forces in Burma
- Jaywick (1943) (United Kingdom) (Australia) – Anglo-Australian attack on Japanese shipping in Singapore harbour
- Krohcol (1942) (United Kingdom) – British move into Thailand to pre-empt expected Japanese action
- Lentil (1945) (United Kingdom) – naval air attack on refineries on Sumatra
- Livery (1945) (United Kingdom) – naval air strikes on northern Malaya and air cover for minesweeping operations
- Longcloth (1943) (United Kingdom) – Chindits advance into Burma
- Matador (1941) (United Kingdom) – Planned British pre-emptive move into Siam from Malaya
- Matador (1945) (United Kingdom) – British occupation of Ramree Island
- Meridian (1945) (United Kingdom) – naval air attacks on installations on Sumatra
- Pamphlet (1943) – convoying of Australian troops from Suez to Australia
- Pike (1940) (United Kingdom) (France) – planned air attack on Soviet oil installations at Baku
- Pioneer (1944) (British Raj) – aborted anti-shipping raid against Kyaukpyu harbour
- Rathunt (1944) (British Raj) – naval patrol of coast near Gwa
- Rimau (1942) (United Kingdom) (Australia) – anti-shipping raid by special forces on Japanese shipping in Singapore harbour
- Sabine (1941) (United Kingdom) (British Raj) – British and Commonwealth invasion of the Kingdom of Iraq to restore government ousted by Rashid Ali; including;
  - Regatta (British Raj) – 21 Brigade advance from Basra by boat up the Tigris.
  - Regulta (British Raj) – "Euphrates Brigade" (20 Indian Brigade) deployment from Basra to Kut by steamer and barge.
- Sabre (1945) (United Kingdom) – cutting of submarine communications cable off Saigon
- Sankey (1945) (United Kingdom) – landings by Royal Marines on Cheduba Island
- Screwdriver (1944) (British Raj) – combined operations raid against a Japanese headquarters at Sitaparokia Rock
- Scupper (1944) (British Raj) – anti-shipping sweep north of Gwa
- Sheikh Mahmut (1943) (Nazi Germany) – failed attempt to establish bases in Iraq
- Sleuth (1944) (United Kingdom) (New Zealand) – pursuit of German commerce raider in Indian Ocean
- Struggle (1945) (United Kingdom) – destruction of IJN cruiser Takao in Singapore harbour, using midget submarines
- Talon (1945) (United Kingdom) (British Raj) – Anglo-Indian capture of Akyab island and construction of supply airbase in support of Burma campaign
  - Lightning (1945) (United Kingdom) (British Raj) – landings on Akyab island
- Thursday (1944) (United Kingdom) – Chindits operation in Burma
- Transom (1944) (United Kingdom) (United States) (Free France) (Australia) (Netherlands) (New Zealand) – Allied naval air raid on Surabaya, Java
- Turret (1945) (United Kingdom) (British Raj) – Anglo-Indian landings and capture of Taungup
- U-Go (1944) (Empire of Japan) – Japanese assault on Imphal and Kohima
- Zipper (1945) (United Kingdom) Planned British seaborne landing in Malaya.
  - Slippery (1945) (United Kingdom) deception operation for Zipper
  - Broadsword (United Kingdom) Planned offensive to northern Malaya following Operation Zipper.
  - Mailfist (United Kingdom) Planned offensive to liberate southern Malaya and Singapore following Operation Zipper.

== Scandinavia and Finland ==
=== Axis ===
- Birke ("Birch") (1944) (Nazi Germany) – German plan to withdraw from northern Finland prior to the Lapland War.
- Birkhahn (1945) (Nazi Germany) – German evacuation from Norway.
- Büffel ("Buffalo") (1940) (Nazi Germany) – German operation to relieve troops in Narvik, Norway.
- Hokki ("Calk") (1944) (Finland) – Finnish plan to destroy railroad tracks to deny the Soviets their supplies.
- Holzauge ("Wood knot") (1942) (Nazi Germany) – activities in Greenland.
- Ikarus (1940) (Nazi Germany) – planned German invasion of Iceland in response to British Operation Fork.
- Juno (1940) (Nazi Germany) – German naval operation to disturb allied supplies to Norway.
- Kilpapurjehdus ("Regatta") (1941) (Finland) – Finnish naval operation for the militarization of the Åland islands.
- Lachsfang (1942) (Nazi Germany) (Finland) – Proposed combined German and Finnish attack against Kandalaksha and Belomorsk.
- Nordlicht ("Aurora Borealis") (1944) (Nazi Germany) – German withdrawal from the Kola Peninsula into Norway.
- Silberfuchs ("Silver Fox") (1941) (Nazi Germany) – German and Finnish operations in the Arctic, including:
  - Blaufuchs 1 ("Blue Fox 1") (1941) (Nazi Germany) – Staging of German forces from Germany to northern Finland.
  - Blaufuchs 2 ("Blue Fox 2") (1941) (Nazi Germany) – Staging of German forces from Norway to northern Finland.
  - Platinfuchs ("Platinum Fox") (1941) (Nazi Germany) (Finland) – Joint German-Finnish attack towards Murmansk from Finnish Petsamo.
  - Polarfuchs ("Polar Fox") (1941) (Nazi Germany) (Finland) – Joint German-Finnish attack towards Kandalaksha from Finnish Lapland.
  - Rentier ("Reindeer") (1941) (Nazi Germany) – German occupation of Petsamo.
- Sizilien (1943) (Nazi Germany) – German raid upon allied occupied Spitsbergen (Svalbard).
- Tanne Ost (1944) (Nazi Germany) – failed German attempt to capture Suursaari from Finland.
- Tanne West (1944) (Nazi Germany) – planned German attempt to capture Åland from Finland.
- Weserübung ("Weser Exercise") (1940) (Nazi Germany) – German invasion of Denmark and Norway.
  - Weserübung Nord ("Weser Exercise") (1940) (Nazi Germany) – German invasion of Trondheim and Narvik.
  - Weserübung Sud ("Weser Exercise") (1940) (Nazi Germany) – German invasion of Bergen, Kristiansand and Oslo.
- Zitronella ("Lemon flavour") (1943) (Nazi Germany) – German raid against a Norwegian/British station on Svalbard.

=== Allies ===
- Alphabet (1940) (United Kingdom) evacuation of British troops from Norway
- Archery (1941) (United Kingdom) – British commando raid on Vågsøy, Norway
  - Anklet (1941) (United Kingdom) – raid on German positions on Lofoten Islands, Norway
- Banquet (1940) (United Kingdom) – Reallocation of RAF training aircraft
- Carthage (1945) (United Kingdom) – RAF bombing of the Gestapo headquarters in Copenhagen, Denmark
- Catherine (1939) (United Kingdom) British plan to gain control of Baltic Sea
- Claymore (1941) (United Kingdom) – British raid on Lofoten Islands, Norway
- Freshman (1942 (United Kingdom) ) – attempted raid on a Norwegian heavy water plant at Vemork, see Gunnerside
  - Grouse (1942) (Norway) – Norwegian guide party for Freshman
  - Gunnerside (1943) (Norway) – 2nd raid on the Norwegian heavy water plant at Vemork
- Fork (1940) (United Kingdom) – Invasion of Iceland by British.
- Gauntlet (1941) (United Kingdom) (Canada) (Norway) – raid on Spitsbergen
- Ibrox (1945) (United Kingdom) – cancelled SAS raid to destroy railway bridge near Trondheim
- Halfback (1945) (United Kingdom) – Naval operation that led to the action of 28 January 1945
- Jupiter (1942) (United Kingdom) – suggested invasion of Norway
- Musketoon (1942) (United Kingdom) – British/ Norwegian destruction of a power station in Norway
- Primrose (1940) (United Kingdom) – Planned British landing at Ålesund, Norway
- R 4 (1940) (United Kingdom) – Planned British invasion of Norway
- Source (1945) (United Kingdom) (Norway) – British response to German Operation Sizilien
- The Sepals/Perianth Operation (1944) – OSS supported operation in Sweden
- Wilfred (1940) (United Kingdom) – British plan to mine the Norwegian coast

=== Other ===
- Rädda Danmark ("Save Denmark") (1945) (Sweden) – Swedish plan to liberate Denmark before the country was occupied by the Soviet Union (cancelled because of German surrender)
  - Rädda Själland (1945) (Sweden) – Swedish landings on Zealand
  - Rädda Bornholm (1945) (Sweden) – Swedish landings on Bornholm

== Technology ==
=== Axis ===
- Caesar (1945) (Nazi Germany) – transfer of technical plans and strategic materials to Japan, using U-864.
- Beethoven (1941–1945) (Nazi Germany) – German programme to develop composite aircraft (Mistel)
- Prüfstand XII ("Test stand") (1945) (Nazi Germany) – German programme to develop submarine-launched V-2

=== Allies ===
- Alsos ("Grove") (1940–1945) (United States) (United Kingdom) – Allied efforts to gather data on German nuclear fission developments.
  - Big (1945) – capture of an atomic pile at Haigerloch.
  - Harborage (1945) (United States) – US sweep up of German atomic assets ahead of French occupation.
  - Epsilon (1945) (United Kingdom) – Eavesdropping on incarcerated German scientists.
- Aphrodite (1944) (United States) The use of B-17 bombers as radio-controlled missiles.
- Backfire (1945) (United Kingdom) – launches of captured V-2 rockets.
- Hawkeye (1944) (United States) – Radar research by US Navy.
- Lusty (1945) (United States) (United Kingdom) – US actions to capture German scientific documents, facilities and aircraft.
- Manhattan Project (1941–1945) (United States) – program to build an atomic bomb.
- Most III ("Bridge III") (1944) (United Kingdom) – transfer of captured V-2 components from occupied Poland to Britain. Also known as Wildhorn III.
- Paperclip (1945–) (United States) – capture of scientists, technical and German rocketry. Originally Operation Overcast sometimes called Project Paperclip.
- Surgeon (1945–) (United Kingdom) – Similar to Paperclip; program to exploit German aeronautical scientific advances.
- Stella Polaris (1944–) (Finland) transfer of Finnish SIGINT, equipment, and personnel to Sweden following end of the Continuation war in 1944.
- TICOM ("Target Intelligence Committee") (1945–) (United States) – seizure of intelligence apparatus, in particular cryptographic assets. See also Stella Polaris.

== Special Operations Executive ==
- Operation Jedburgh (1944) (United Kingdom) (United States) (Free France) (Dutch government-in-exile) – SOE, OSS, and Free French-Belgian-Dutch exiles parachuted into France, the Netherlands and Belgium to perform guerrilla warfare.

== Partisan operations ==
Includes some operations by regular forces in support of partisans

- Anthropoid (1942) (Czechoslovakia) (United Kingdom) – assassination of Reinhard Heydrich in Prague.
- Burza ("Tempest") (1944) (Poland) – a series of local uprisings by the Polish Home Army
  - Ostra Brama (1944) (Poland) – battle for Wilno (Vilnius)
- Canuck (1945) (United Kingdom) – SAS operation near Turin to train and organise Italian resistance fighters.
- Carpetbagger (1943) (United States) – US airdrops to several national Resistance forces
- Główki ("Heads") (1943–1944) (Poland) – a series of assassinations of Nazi personnel by the Home Army
  - Bürkl (1943) (Poland) – assassination of Franz Bürkl
  - Hunting (1944) (Poland) – assassination of Ludwig Fischer
  - Kutschera (1944) (Poland) – assassination of Franz Kutschera
- Montagnards (1944) (Free France) – FFI action to establish base in Vercors Massif
  - Cadillac (1944) (United States) – airborne supply operation to FFI in Vercors Massif
  - Eucalyptus (1944) (United States) – airdrop into Vercors Massif of liaison teams
  - Zebra (1944) (United States) – airborne supply operation to FFI in Vercors Massif
- Josephine B (1941) (Free France) – Free French attack the transformer station at Pessac
- Savannah (1941) (Free France) – Free French attempt to ambush and kill Luftwaffe pathfinder pilots in France
- Taśma ("Belt") (1943–1944) (Poland) – action of the Home Army against German border guarding stations
- Wieniec ("Garland") (1942) (Poland) – action of the Polish Związek Odwetu against German railway transport
- Zamość Uprising (1942–1944) (Poland) – series of operations of the Polish resistance against the Germans

== Intelligence ==
=== Axis ===
- Bernhard (1944) (Nazi Germany) — German plan to damage British economy using forged British banknotes.
- Elster ("Magpie") (1944) (Nazi Germany) – landings of German agents on the US east coast with objective of gathering intelligence on Manhattan Project
- Haudegen ("Broadsword") (1944) (Nazi Germany) – German intelligence collection in Spitzbergen, Norway
- Hummer ("Lobster") series (1940 onwards) (Nazi Germany) – insertion of German agents into Britain. See also Hummer I
- Kadella (1945) (Nazi Germany) – airdrop of agents near Marseille
- Plan Kathleen (1941) (Nazi Germany) – plan sent by the Irish Republican Army (IRA) to Germany seeking support for activities. Dubbed "Artus" by German Foreign Ministry. See IRA Abwehr World War II for all IRA Abwehr involvement.
- Karneval (1945) (Nazi Germany) – airdrop of agents near Brussels and Waal
- Mosul (1944) (Nazi Germany) – air drop of agents and supplies near Mosul
- Pastorius (1942) (Nazi Germany) – separate landings of German agents on the US east coast with objective of industrial sabotage.
- Perlen-fischer (1945) (Nazi Germany) – airdrop of agents near Paris
- Salaam (1942) (Nazi Germany) – insertion of German agents into the British-occupied Kingdom of Egypt
- Seemöwe ("Seagull") series (1940 onwards) (Nazi Germany) – insertion of German agents into Britain and Ireland. See also Seagull I and Seagull II.
- Taube ("Dove/Pigeon") (1940) (Nazi Germany) – mission to transport IRA Chief of Staff Seán Russell from Germany back to Ireland.
- Wal ("Whale") (1940) (Nazi Germany) – aborted German plan to foster links with Scottish and Welsh nationalist groups.
- Walfisch ("Whale") (1940) (Nazi Germany) – aborted German plan to land an agent in Ireland.

=== Allies ===
- Cornflakes (1945) (United States) – insertion of propaganda into the German mail system.
- SIGSALY (1943—1945) (United States) – secure speech system for highest-level Allied communications.
- MAGIC (1939 —) (United States) – SIGINT resulting from Japanese cipher system PURPLE.
- Ruthless (1940) (United Kingdom) – Admiralty plan of Ian Fleming to capture an Enigma encryption machine.
- Venona (1940—) (United Kingdom) (United States) – intelligence sharing resulting from spying on Soviets.
- Ultra (United Kingdom) – SIGINT resulting from German cipher system Enigma.
- Cardinal (1945) (United States) – OSS team parachuted into Japanese Manchukuo to rescue Allied POWs including General Wainwright

== Uncategorized ==
- Alpenfestung (Nazi Germany) – plan for Nazi national Redoubt in Alps.
  - Werwolf (1945–50) (Nazi Germany) – guerrilla force to resist occupation by Allies.
- Big Bang (1947) (United Kingdom) – demolition of defences of Heligoland
- Bracelet (1942) (United Kingdom) – Churchill's flight to Cairo and Moscow.
- Catapult (1940) (United Kingdom) – Royal Navy actions to seize, disable or destroy the French fleet after France's surrender.
- Downfall (1945) (United States) – Proposed Allied plan for the invasion of Japan.
- Operation Sunrise (1945) (Nazi Germany) (United Kingdom) (Switzerland) (United States) – negotiations leading to German surrender in Italy.
- Eiche ("Oak") (1943) (Nazi Germany) – German rescue from custody of Benito Mussolini
- Frantic (1943) – The use of Soviet airfields by western Allied bombers.
- Feuerzauber ("Fire Magic") (1936–39) – Transfer of planes, engineers, and pilots to nationalist forces during Spanish Civil War.
  - Rügen (1937) (Nazi Germany) – Bombing of Guernica.
  - Bodden (1937–43) (Nazi Germany) – Abwehr intelligence gathering system operating from Spain and Morocco.
  - Ursula (1936–1939) (Nazi Germany) – Kriegsmarine U-boat operations in support of Francoist and Italian navies.
- Gaff (1944) – attempt to kill Erwin Rommel
- Halyard (1944) – Non-combat Allied airlift behind Axis lines in Yugoslavia
- Jericho (1944) – Allied aircraft bombed Amiens prison in German-occupied France to aid Resistance prison escape
- Keelhaul (1945) (United States) (United Kingdom) – forced repatriation to the Soviet Union, by the western Allies, of Soviet prisoners of war
- Magic Carpet (1945–1946) (United States) – American post-war operation to transport US military personnel home
- Manna (1945) – Allied air drops of food to famine-ravaged Netherlands, with German cooperation
- Margarethe (1944) (Nazi Germany) – German occupation of Hungary. Döme Sztójay, an avid supporter of the Nazis, became the new Hungarian Prime Minister with the aid of a Nazi military governor.
- Panzerfaust/Eisenfaust ("Armored Fist") (1944) (Nazi Germany) – Kidnap of Hungarian leader Miklós Horthy's son to prevent defection of Hungary from Axis.
- Peking (1939) (Poland) – removal of Polish warships to Britain, in advance of German invasion
- Pied Piper (1939) (United Kingdom) – evacuation of children from British cities.
- Rabat (1943) (Nazi Germany) – Plan to kidnap the Pope and diplomatic corp. from Vatican City.
- Regenbogen ("Rainbow") (1945) (Nazi Germany) – rescinded order to scuttle Kriegsmarine.
- Rösselsprung ("Knights Move") (1944) (Nazi Germany) – German attempt to capture Josip Broz Tito
- Safehaven (1944) – allied efforts to capture fleeing Nazis and seize German resources abroad
- Symbol (1943) (United Kingdom) – Churchill's flight to Casablanca.
- Tabarin (1943) (United Kingdom) – British Antarctic expedition.
- Tannenbaum
- Operation Walküre ("Valkyrie") (1944) (Nazi Germany) – Plan to deal with general breakdown of civil order within Germany following the death of Hitler and the seizure of power by other Nazi officials or the SS; a cover for clandestine action by the German resistance.
- Worek ("Sack") (1939) (Poland) – Polish naval defence of the Polish coast
- Rainbow War Plans (1920s–30s) (United States) – Global US War planning between the World Wars.

== Propaganda, war crimes, and genocide ==
- Himmler (1939) (Nazi Germany) – A false flag SS and SD operation. Attacks were made against German buildings, near the Polish-German border, to create the appearance of Polish aggression against Germany. This was to then be used as propaganda to justify the German invasion of Poland.
- Reinhard (1943) (Nazi Germany) – Phase I of the "Final Solution" targeting Jews across Europe.
- Tannenberg (1939) (Nazi Germany) – plan to exterminate Polish intelligentsia involving Einsatzgruppen.
- Sonderaktion Krakau (1939) (Nazi Germany) Operation to murder members of the intelligentsia at universities in Kraków.
- Generalplan Ost (1942) (Nazi Germany) plan for ethnic cleansing across Europe. See Also Barbarossa.
