= Project Alpha =

Project Alpha can mean:

- Project Alpha (hoax), a parapsychology hoax
- Project Alpha (military), a discontinued U.S. military project
- Project Alpha (non-proliferation effort), a nuclear non-proliferation project
- Project Alpha (police), a Metropolitan Police Service project
- Project Alpha (TV program), a 2022 Thai reality competition show

== See also ==
- Operation Alfa
- Operation Alpha
