= Operation Fruhwirth =

Akcja Fruhwirth (eng. Operation Fruhwirth) - assassination attempt carried out on October 25, 1943 at SS-Scharführer Engelberth Frühwirth, which was part of an extensive campaign to eliminate representatives of the Nazi German terror apparatus in occupied Poland called Operation Heads (Polish: Operacja Główki).

== History ==
The planned action to kill Frühwirth failed. The assassins mistook the aim and they shot the SS-Scharführer Stephan Klein, who was the official of the IVth Office of the Commander of the Security Police and Security Service of the Warsaw District in General Government. Klein was also sentenced to death by the Polish Underground State and his name was also on the list of people to be killed in "action Heads".

== Bibliography ==
- Strzembosz, Tomasz (1983). "Akcje zbrojne podziemnej Warszawy 1939–1944" (eng. Armed actions of underground Warsaw 1939-1944) (in Polish). Warszawa: Państwowy Instytut Wydawniczy. ISBN 8306007174.
