= Łapanka =

World War II roundups by Germans in Poland

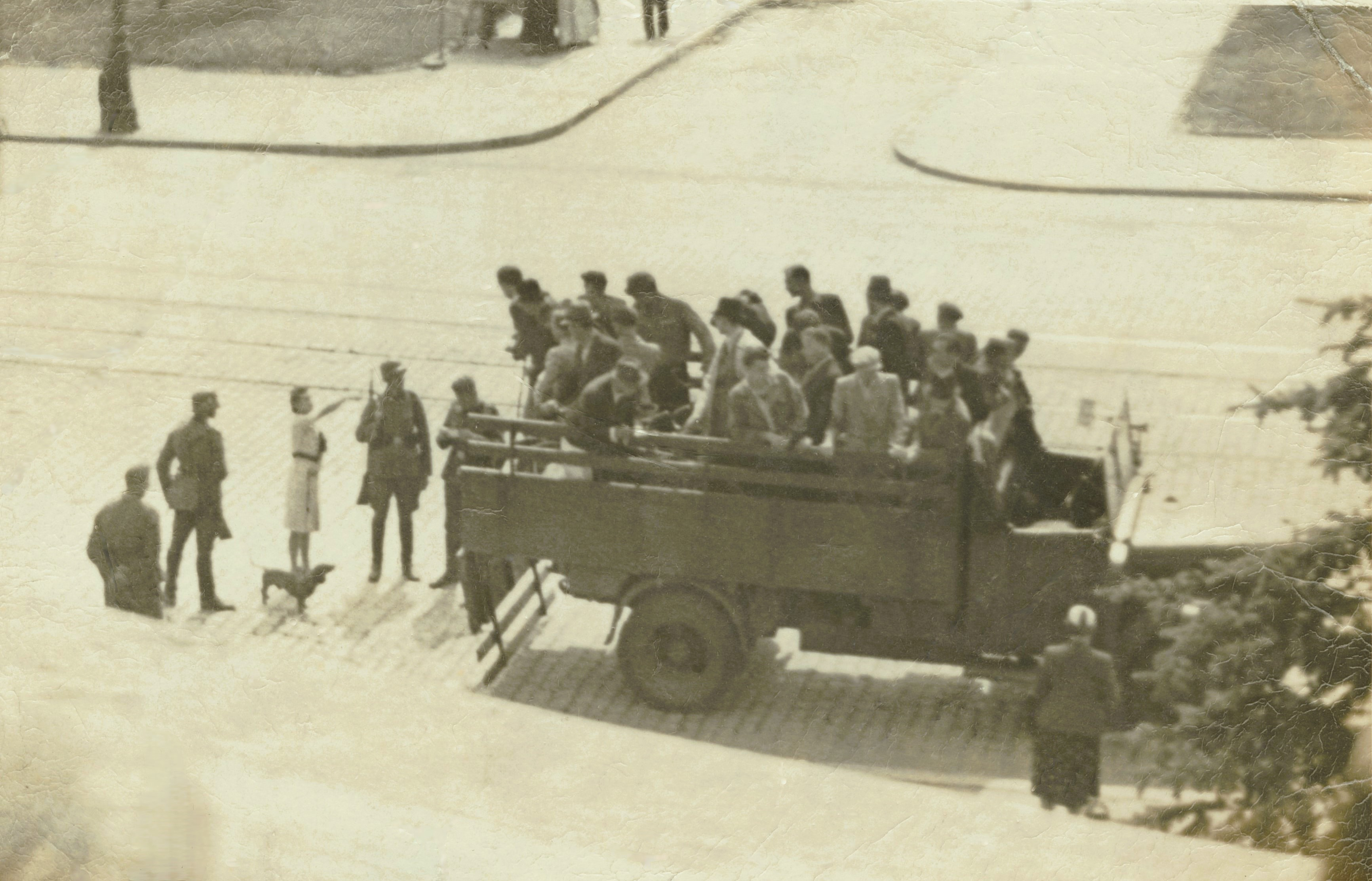
- 1941 roundup in Warsaw's Żoliborz district
- Location: Nazi-occupied Europe, predominantly Nazi occupied Poland
- Period: World War II (1939–1945)

Łapanka ([waˈpanka]; English: "roundup" or "catching") was the Polish name for a World War II practice in German-occupied Poland, whereby the German SS, Wehrmacht and Gestapo rounded up civilians on the streets of Polish cities. The civilians arrested were in most cases chosen at random from among passers-by or inhabitants of city quarters surrounded by German forces prior to the action.

The term usually refers to the action of rounding up and arresting a number of random people. Those caught in a łapanka were either taken hostage, arrested, sent to labor camps or concentration camps, or summarily executed.

Those caught in roundups were most often sent to slave labour in Nazi Germany, but some were also taken as hostages or executed in reprisal actions; imprisoned and sent to concentration camps or summarily executed in numerous ethnic-cleansing operations.

== History ==
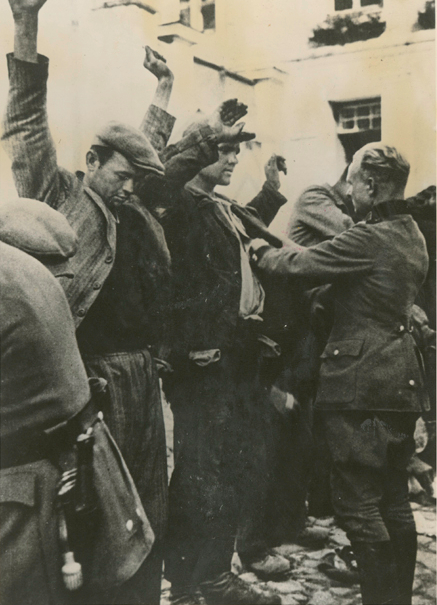
Street roundup in Warsaw 1941

The term łapanka, derived from the Polish verb łapać ("to catch"), carried a sardonic connotation due to the prior use of the word łapanka for the children's game known in English as "tag".

"Round ups, or lapankas, the Polish name they were known under, became an essential feature of life in Warsaw and precipitated much wider ferocity on both sides. (...) Whole streets were sealed off by police and soldiers and most trapped men and women were carted off to concentration camps or sent as slave labour to the Reich. Tram and trainloads of people, regardless of work documents, were herded like cattle into trucks, many never to see home or family again." - Ron Jeffery memoir, 1943

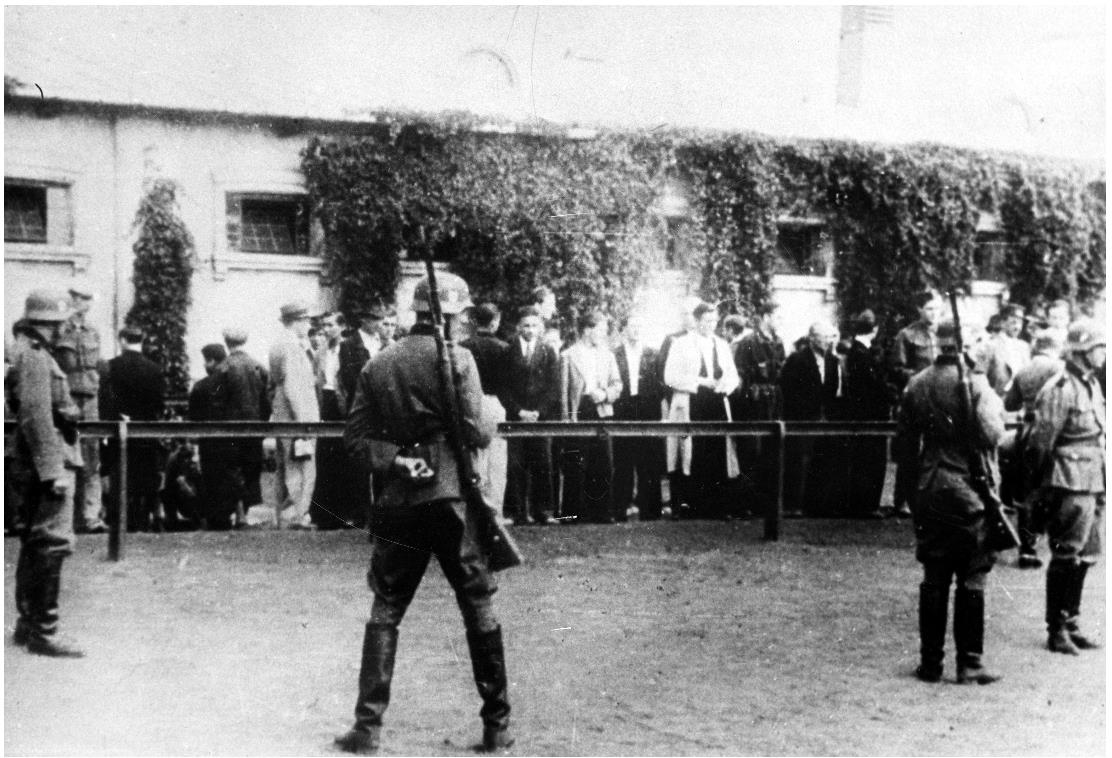
Victims of roundup, transit camp at Szwoleżerów Street (pl), Warsaw, 1942

Most people who were rounded up were transported to labour camps (Arbeitslager) or concentration camps, including Auschwitz. Many Polish women were selected for sexual slavery. Many Polish children were kidnapped for adoption by German families. Some − those without proper documents or carrying contraband − were transported to concentration and death camps. Others, particularly Jews in hiding and Poles wanted for harboring them, were shot dead on the spot.

The term was also used for describing the tactic of cordoning-off of streets, and the systematic searching of buildings. For men in their 20s and 30s, the only reliable defense against being taken away by the Nazis was the possession of an identity card (called Ausweis) certifying that the holder was employed by a Nazi-German company or a government agency locally (for example, by the city utilities or the railways). Thus, many of those who were taken from cafes and restaurants in Warsaw on the night of 5 December 1940 were subsequently released after their documents had been checked.

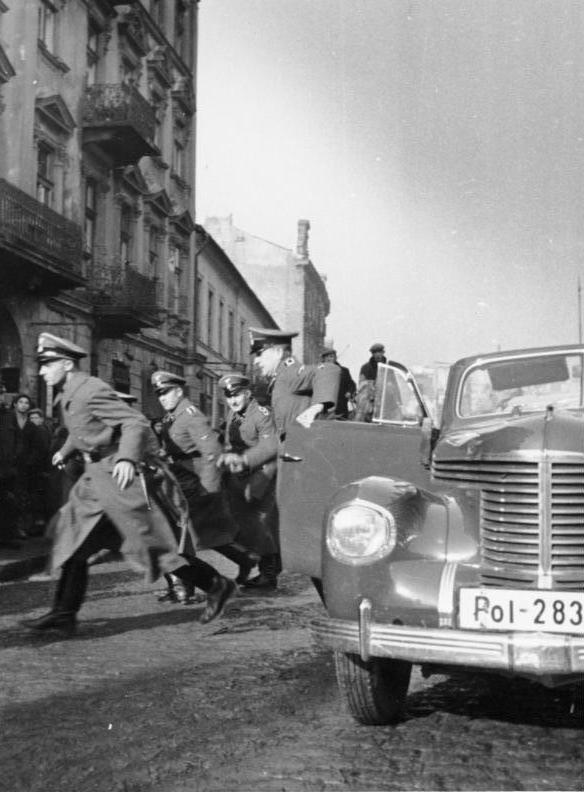
Sicherheitsdienst roundup, occupied Poland

According to estimates, in Warsaw alone between 1942 and 1944 the Nazi łapankas claimed at least 400 victims every day, with numbers reaching several thousand on some days. On 19 September 1942, nearly 3,000 men and women, who had been caught in massive round-ups all over Warsaw during the previous two days, were transported by train-loads to slave labour in Nazi Germany.

== Targeted territories ==
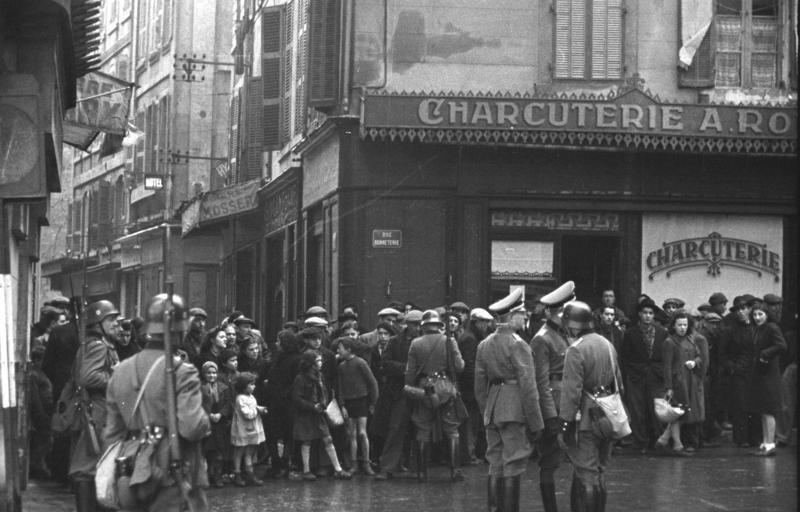
Nazi German roundup in France (rafle), Marseille January 1943.

Such roundups as Poland's łapanka were carried out by Nazi Germany in other occupied countries as well, particularly in northern France, although not as extensively as in Poland. The French term for this practice was rafle, applied primarily to the rounding-up of French Jews. In Denmark and the Netherlands, a Nazi roundup was called razzia.

In historical terms, the razzia roundup was used in French colonial context for Muslim raids particularly to plunder and capture slaves from Western and Central Africa, also known as rezzou when practiced by the Tuareg. (See also: Barbary slave trade) The word was adopted from ġaziya of Algerian Arabic vernacular and later became a figurative name for any act of pillage, with its verb form razzier. The Soviets used similar tactics to round up middle-class Poles in the part of Poland that they occupied following the 1939 invasion of Poland. Men, women, and children were transported to labour camps in remote regions of the Soviet Union.

== Polish resistance ==
Bydgoszcz roundup on 8 September 1939.

In 1940, one roundup was used by Home Army secret agent Witold Pilecki to gain entry into the Auschwitz camp set up at about that time for Polish prisoners. There, he gathered first-hand intelligence on the camp, and organised inmate resistance. Pilecki deliberately went out into the street during a Warsaw roundup on 19 September 1940, and was arrested by the Nazis along with other civilians. Auschwitz was the main destination for the Poles from beyond the Warsaw Ghetto. There he organised Związek Organizacji Wojskowej (ZOW, the Military Organization Association), and in November 1940 sent its first report about the camp and the genocide being committed there to Home Army headquarters in Warsaw.

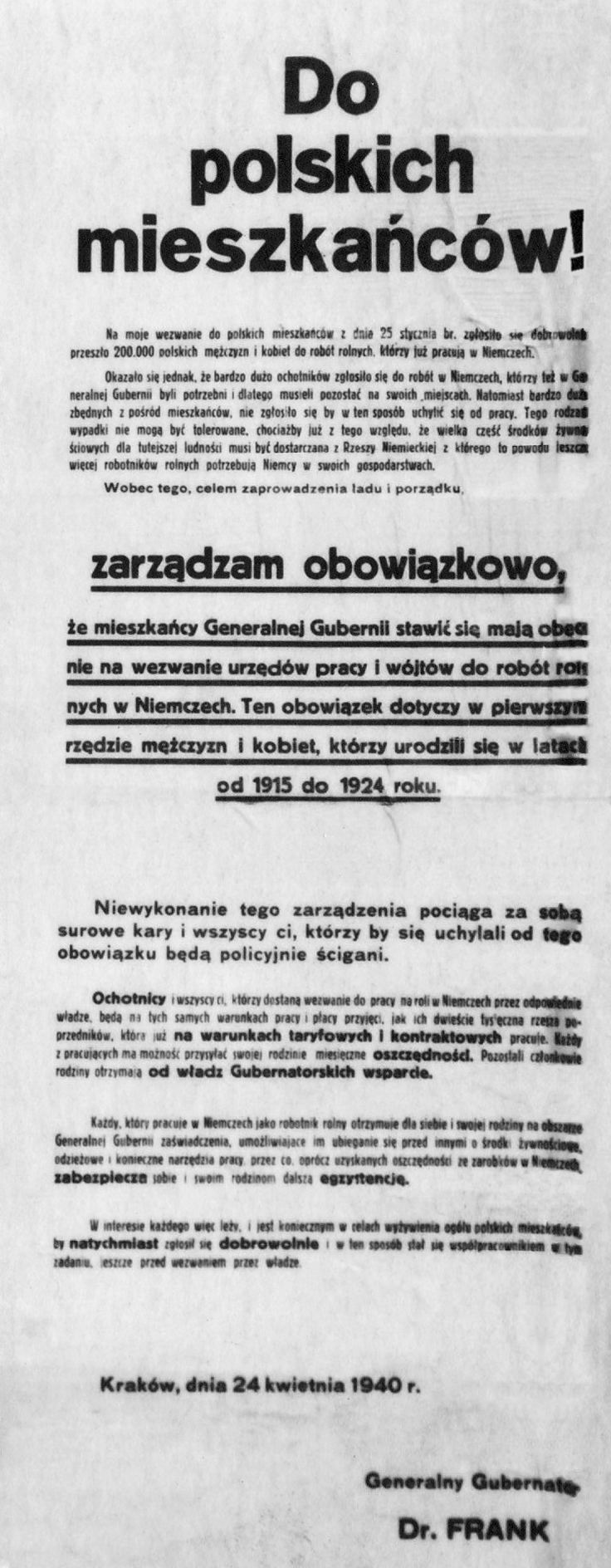
Hans Frank's announcement of forced labor, 1940

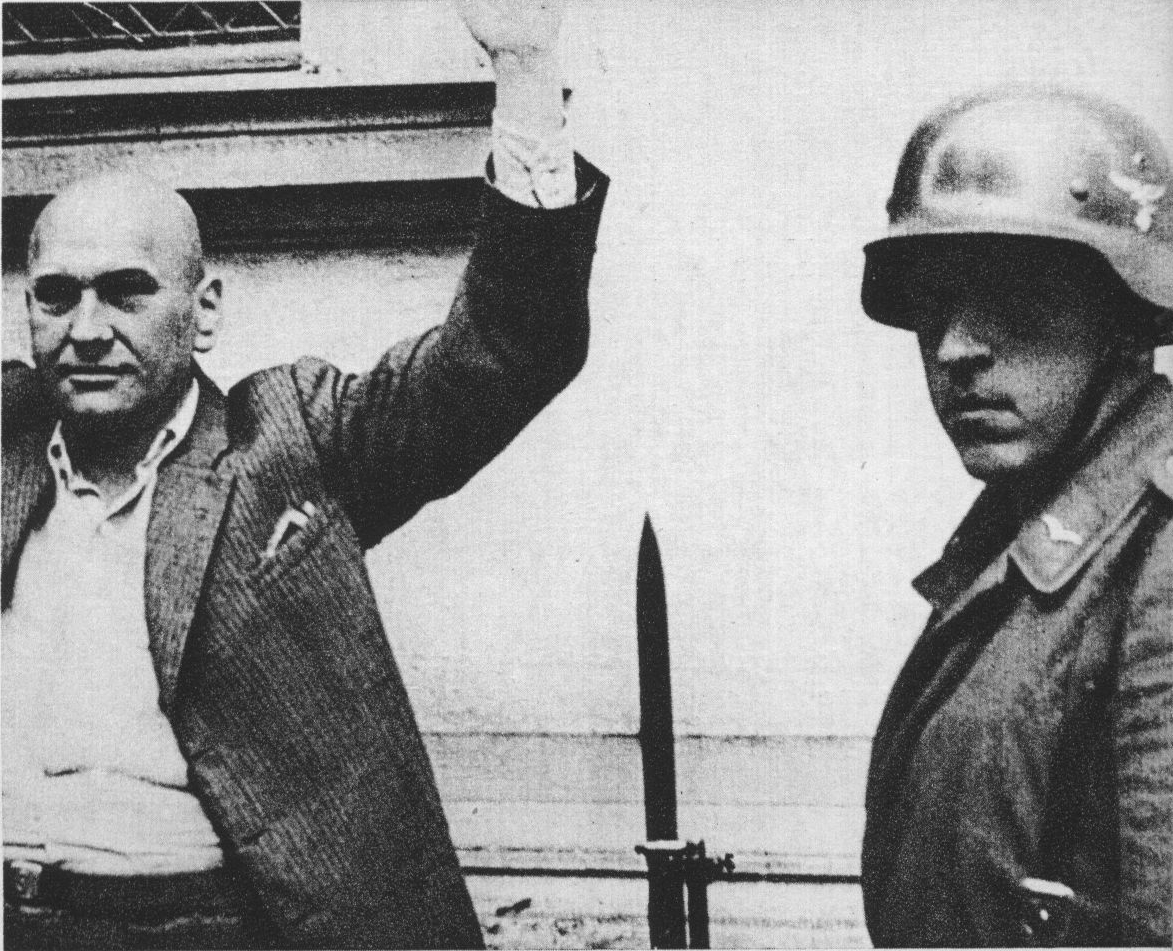
Bydgoszcz roundup, 8 September 1939 – Polish civilian being guarded by a Luftwaffe soldier

In retribution for roundups as acts of Nazi terror, the Polish resistance carried out attacks on Nazi forces and prepared lists of Nazi leaders to be eliminated for their crimes against civilians. Nazi personnel responsible for organizing roundups, such as members of local unemployment offices, the SS, SD, and Ordnungspolizei, were sentenced to death by the underground court of the Polish Underground for crimes against Polish citizens during the occupation of Poland. Because of the particular brutality of the police, the Home Army killed 361 gendarmes in 1943, and 584 in 1944. In Warsaw alone, ten Nazis were killed daily. From August to December 1942, the Home Army launched 87 attacks on the Nazi administration and members of the apparatus of terror. In 1943 this number rose radically − the Home Army carried out 514 attacks during the first four months. In an underground operation known as Operation Heads (Operacja Główki), Polish underground combat units from Kedyw eliminated roundup organizers such as:

1. Kurt Hoffman - chief of the unemployment office in Warsaw responsible for organising roundups of Poles. Executed by the AK on 9 April 1943.
2. Hugo Dietz - Hoffmann's assistant. Executed on 13 April 1943.
3. Fritz Geist - chief of the unemployment office department. Killed on 10 May 1943.
4. Willi Lübbert - worked at the unemployment office and organised roundups of Poles to be sent to Nazi labor camps. Executed on 1 July 1944.
5. Eugen Bollodino - worked at the unemployment office and organised roundups of Poles to be sent to Nazi labor camps. Executed by combat patrol unit DB-17 on 8 June 1944.

== In culture ==
Criticism of the Nazi practice of roundups was the theme of the most popular song of occupied Warsaw, Siekiera, motyka (Polish for Axe, Hoe). In 1943 it was published by the Polish resistance's underground press in the book Posłuchajcie ludzie... (Listen, folks), one of the bibuła publications of the Komisja Propagandy (Propaganda Commission) of the Armia Krajowa (Home Army). The song was also reproduced in several books and records after the Nazi occupation ended. In 1946, the song was featured in the first Polish movie created after the war, Zakazane piosenki, directed by Leonard Buczkowski.

== See also ==
- Chronicles of Terror
- Forced labour under German rule during World War II
- German camps in occupied Poland during World War II
- War crimes in occupied Poland during World War II
- Nazi crimes against the Polish nation
