= Witold Sadowy =

Polish actor (1920–2020)

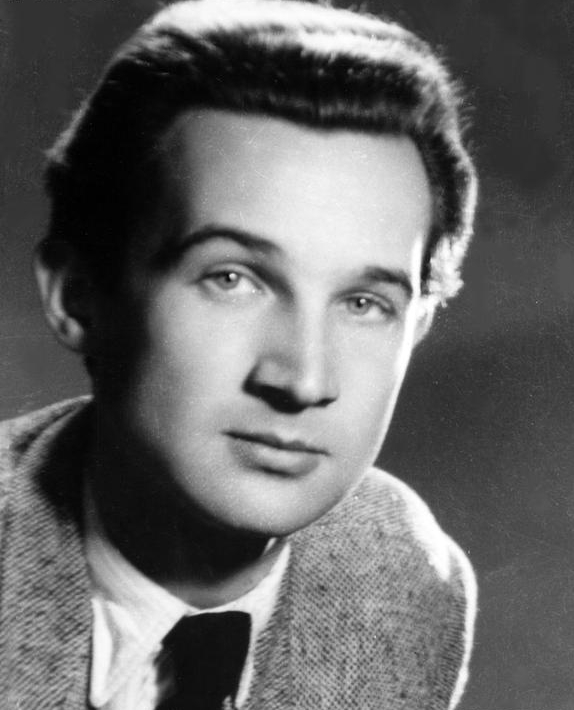
- Witold Sadowy, ca. 1950
- Born: 7 January 1920; Warsaw, Second Polish Republic
- Died: 15 November 2020 (aged 100); Konstancin-Jeziorna, Poland
- Occupations: Actor, publicist
- Years active: 1945–1990 (actor); 1985–2020 (publicist)
- Partner: Jan Ryżow (1942–1996)

Witold Sadowy (7 January 1920 – 15 November 2020) was a Polish film and theatre actor as well as publicist and columnist of the Gazeta Wyborcza daily and Życie na gorąco magazine.

== Life and career ==
He was born on 7 January 1920 in Warsaw. In 1944, during the Warsaw Uprising, he lost his father and brother. He returned to Warsaw with his mother after the Soviets gained control of the city.

He made his theatre debut in 1945 by performing the role of Florian in Maurice Maeterlinck's play Le Bourgmestre de Stilmonde directed by Ryszard Wasilewski. He worked at such Warsaw theatres as City Drama Theatre (1945, 1946–1949), Polish Theatre (1945–1946; 1949–1951), New Theatre (1951–1953), Młoda Warszawa Theatre (1953–1957), Classic Theatre (1957–1972) and TR Warszawa (1972–1988). He gave his last performance in 1989 by playing the role of Field Marshal in Zygmunt Nowakowski's play The Rosemary Twig.

In the 1980s, he began working as a theatre columnist and publicist in such newspapers as Życie Warszawy, Życie Codzienne, Słowo, Express Wieczorny and the New York-based Nowy Dziennik. Since 1985, he also wrote articles in Gazeta Wyborcza. He published a number of books on theatre and film and came to be known as "the chronicler of Warsaw's theatre life". The Polish Union of Stage Actors (ZASP), awarded him the title of distinguished member as a recognition of his work.

== Personal life ==
In January 2020, at the age of 100, he publicly came out as homosexual in a television reportage by TVP Kultura channel devoted to the celebration of the centenary of his birth. He lived in a relationship with Jan Ryżow, an engineer, from 1942 until Ryżow's death in 1996. In March 2020, his coming out received a considerable national and international attention. He died on 15 November 2020.

== Filmography ==
- 1946: Zakazane piosenki – violinist
- 1960: Bad Luck – soldier
- 1970: Pogoń za Adamem – officer
- 1973: Wielka miłość Balzaka – Victor Hugo (episode 7)
- 1978: ... Gdziekolwiek jesteś panie prezydencie
- 1980: Zamach stanu
- 1980: Sherlock Holmes and Doctor Watson – man in a hotel (episode 24)
- 1980: Punkt widzenia (episode 5)
- 1981: Przyjaciele (episode 4)

== Publications ==
- Teatr za kulisami i na scenie, Oficyna wydawnicza "Rytm”, Warsaw 1995, ISBN 83-85249-98-2.
- Teatr – plotki, aktorzy, wspomnienia zza kulis, Oficyna wydawnicza "Rytm”, Warsaw 1995, ISBN 83-85249-51-6.
- Ludzie teatru – mijają lata, zostają wspomnienia, Oficyna wydawnicza "Rytm”, Warsaw 2000.
- Czas który minął, Oficyna wydawnicza "Rytm”, Warsaw 2009, ISBN 978-83-7399-356-3.
- Przekraczam setkę. Zapis wspomnień 2018-2019, Wydawnictwo ZASP, Warsaw 2020, ISBN 978-83-952549-1-8.

== Honours and awards ==
- Medal of the Centenary of Regained Independence, 2020
- Commander's Cross of the Order of Polonia Restituta, 2012
- Pro Masovia Medal, 2012
- Warsaw Feliks Award, 2011
- Officers Cross of the Order of Polonia Restituta, 2001
- Knight's Cross of the Order of Polonia Restituta, 1987
- Medal of the 40th Anniversary of People's Poland, 1986
- Golden Cross of Merit, 1979

== See also ==
- Cinema of Poland
