= Operation Kutschera =

Code name for assassination carried out by Poland

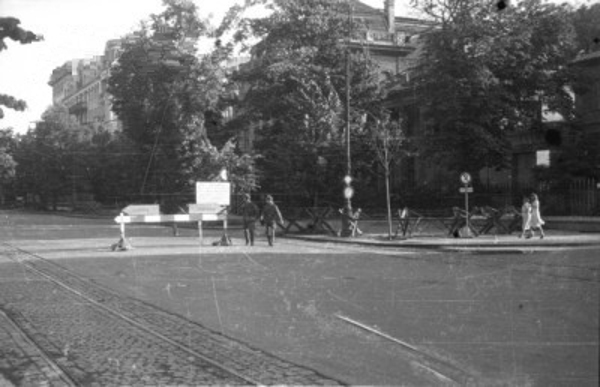
The site of the assassination

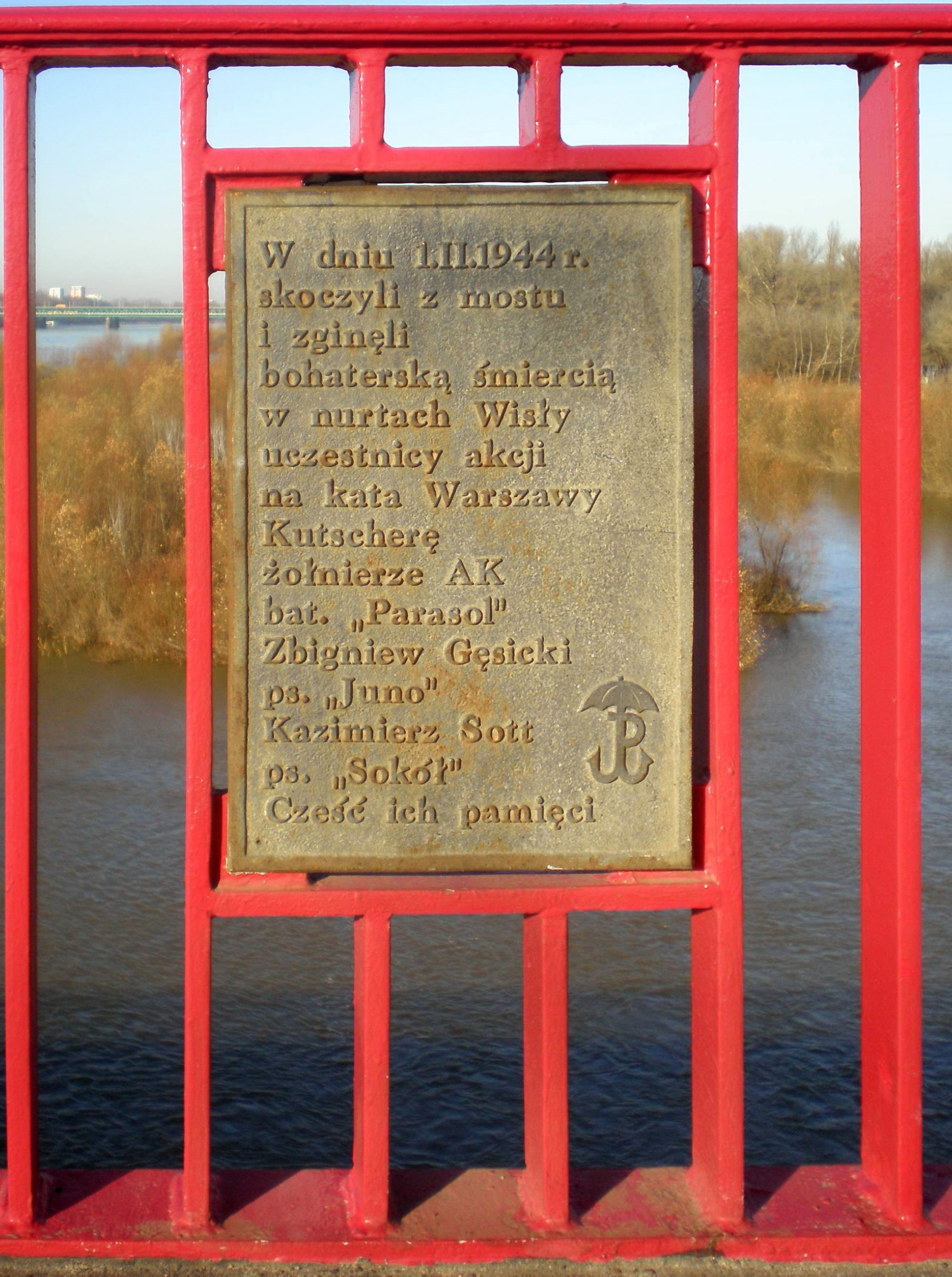
Memorial to the two Polish resistance fighters "Juno" and "Sokół" who were killed in action during Operation Kutschera.

Operation Kutschera was the code name for the Polish resistance's assassination of Austrian Nazi Franz Kutschera, SS and Reich's Police Chief in German-occupied Warsaw, outside his office on his way to work.

After being tried in absentia by the Polish Secret State, Kutschera was shot dead on 1 February 1944 by the Kedyw special operations unit of the underground Home Army. It was a part of the larger Operation Heads - the code name of a series of post-trial assassination of Nazi officials by the Polish Resistance.

300 randomly-chosen Polish civilians were murdered in reprisal.

== Background ==
SS-Brigadeführer and Generalmajor der Polizei, Franz Kutschera, became SS and Police Leader of the Warsaw District on 25 September 1943. During his earlier posting in the Mogilev District of the Soviet Union he proved himself as a ruthless officer, prone to brutal and unscrupulous methods.

Soon after his arrival in Warsaw he stepped up terror measures directed against the civilian population. The number of public executions and łapanka round-ups were increased, and lists of hostages to be shot in reprisal for civil disobedience or any attack on a German soldier were published daily. These actions, based on a decree by Hans Frank, were intended to crush the will to resist among the Polish population. As a result, the Polish underground leadership included Kutschera in its "Operation Heads" list.

Kutschera's whereabouts in Warsaw were a closely guarded secret but were discovered by Aleksander Kunicki (code name "Rayski"), head of intelligence of the Agat company, while he was investigating two other assassination targets: Dr Ludwig Hahn, Kommandeur of the Sicherheitspolizei and the Sicherheitsdienst (SD) in occupied Warsaw and SS-Sturmbannführer Walter Stamm.

In the course of his surveillance of the area around the Gestapo HQ on Aleje Szucha, Rayski one day noticed an Opel Admiral limousine entering the drive of the building at Aleje Ujazdowskie number 23, which was then the SS headquarters in Warsaw (and now houses the Hungarian Embassy). The SS-man who emerged from the car wore the insignia of a general, and Rayski began to monitor his arrivals and departures from the building. The SS-man was soon identified as Kutschera, who actually lived only 150 metres away, at Aleja Róż number 2. Rayski also discovered that despite the short distance from his home to the SS headquarters, Kutschera always used his car to get there.

== Preparations ==
Rayski filed a report about Kutschera to Kedyw commander Emil August Fieldorf (code name "Nil") and several days later Kutschera was sentenced to death by a "Special Court" of the Polish Underground State. Adam Borys (code name "Pług"), commander of the Parasol Battalion of the Armia Krajowa, selected Parasol's 1st Platoon to carry out the assassination. Platoon commander Bronisław Pietraszewicz (code name "Lot") was appointed as leader of the assassination team and planned the operation in close cooperation with Pług.

The first attempt on Kutschera's life was prepared for 28 January 1944 but had to be aborted after Kutschera failed to leave his home that day. After the assassination team broke up, one member of the platoon, Jan Kordulski (code name "Żbik"), was wounded by a German patrol. He was replaced in the team by Zbigniew Gęsicki (code name "Juno") and Stanisław Huskowski (code name "Ali").

The second attempt took place on the morning of 1 February 1944. The assassination team was in position at 8:50 am and included:

1. "Lot" (Bronisław Pietraszewicz) – commander and 1st assassin (armed with: MP 40 submachine gun, Vis pistol, Filipinka hand grenade).
2. "Ali" (Stanisław Huskowski) – second-in-command and security screen (grenades).
3. "Kruszynka" (Zdzisław Poradzki) – 2nd assassin (Sten submachine gun, grenades).
4. "Miś" (Michał Issajewicz) – 3rd assassin, driving an Adler Trumpf-Junior and armed with a Parabellum pistol and grenades.
5. "Cichy" (Marian Senger) – cover (Sten submachine gun, Parabellum pistol, grenades).
6. "Olbrzym" (Henryk Humięcki) – cover (Sten submachine gun, Parabellum pistol, grenades).
7. "Juno" (Zbigniew Gęsicki) – cover (Sten submachine gun, Vis pistol, hand grenades).
8. "Bruno" (Bronisław Hellwig) – driving an Opel Kapitän and armed with 2 Parabellums and grenades.
9. "Sokół" (Kazimierz Sott) – driving a Mercedes 170 V and armed with 2 Parabellums and grenades.
10. "Kama" (Maria Stypułkowska-Chojecka) – signals.
11. "Dewajtis" (Elżbieta Dziębowska) – signals.
12. "Hanka" (Anna Szarzyńska-Rewska) – signals.

== The assassination ==
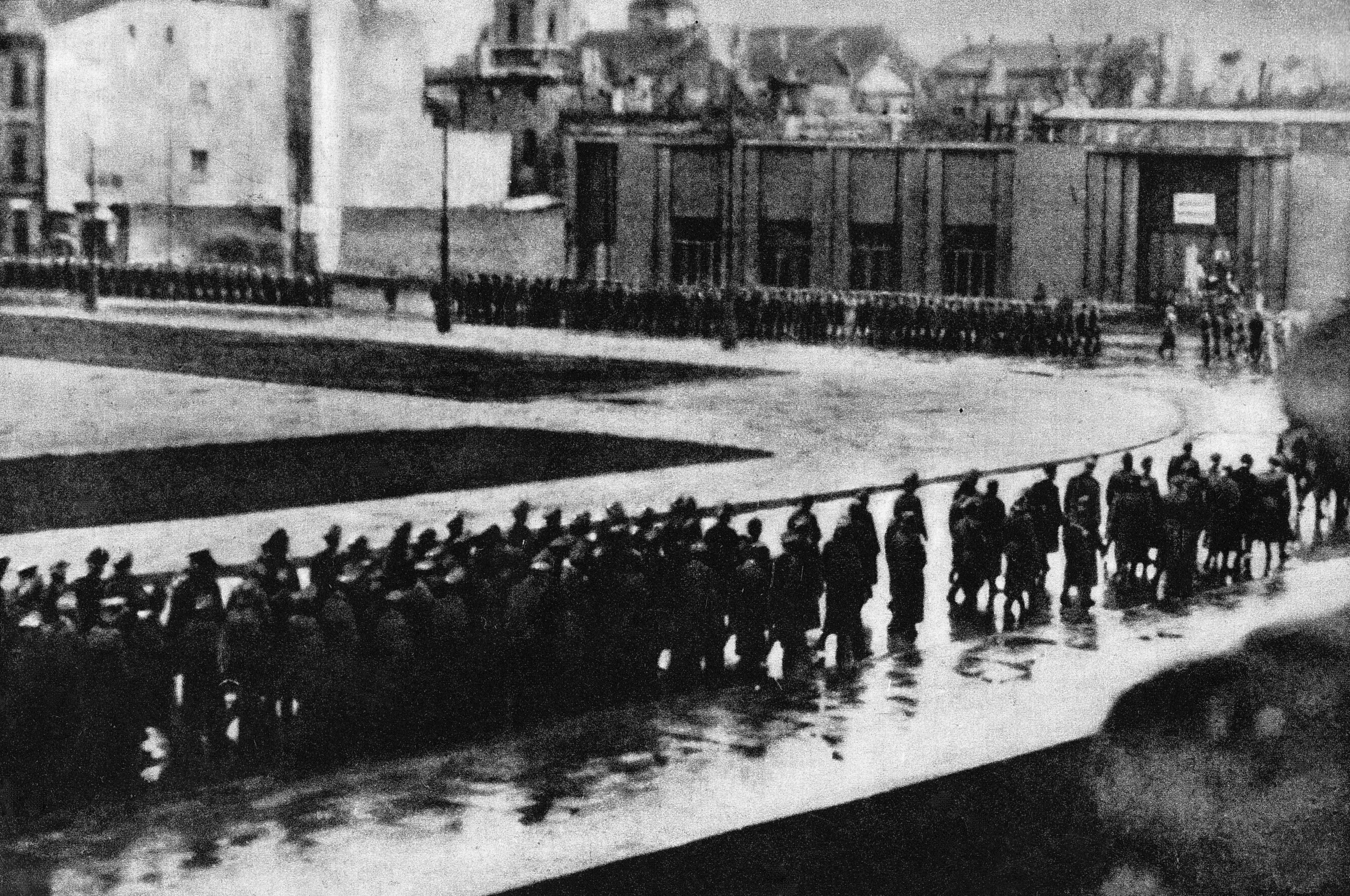
Kutschera's funeral procession in Adolf Hitler Platz in Warsaw

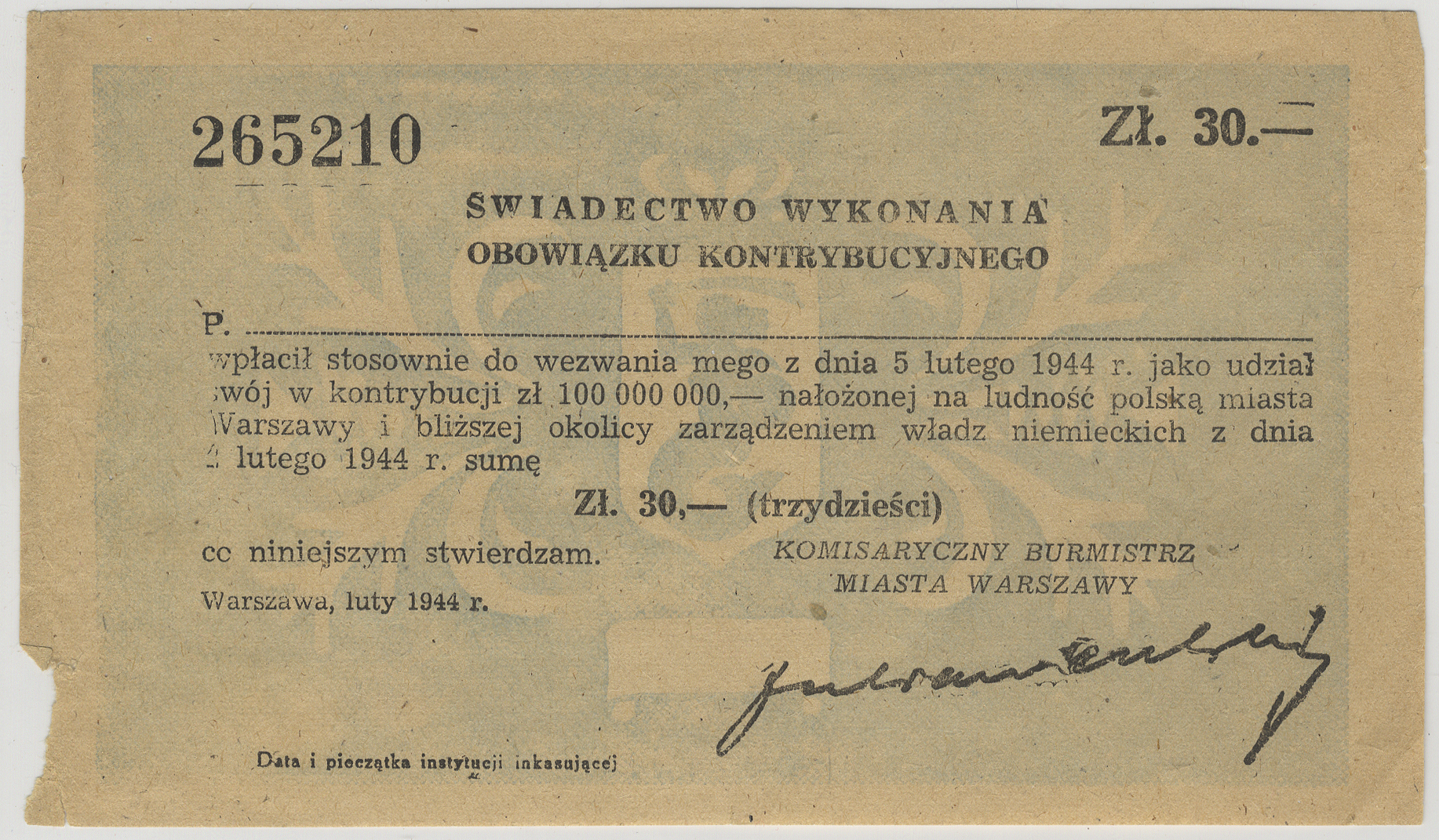
Payment receipt for a 30 Zloty reparation/repercussion payment due from all residents of Warsaw and surrounding areas as retribution for the Polish underground's Operation Kutschera - the successful assassination of Franz Kutschera, SS General and SS and Police Leader, Warsaw district

At 9:09 am Kama (who was standing near the entrance to Ujazdowski Park) signalled that Kutschera was leaving his house at Aleja Róż number 2, in his limousine. As he approached the gate of the SS HQ, he was blocked by the car driven by Miś.

Lot and Kruszynka left the car, approached the limousine and opened fire on it at close range, killing the driver and badly wounding Kutschera. Miś then exited the car as well and finished off Kutschera with a gunshot to the head. They then searched his body for documents. Meanwhile, the two other getaway vehicles moved into position and German guards stationed nearby opened fire on the team. An intense shootout then erupted between the Germans and the covering team (Cichy, Olbrzym and Juno). At this critical moment, Ali was unable to open his briefcase, in which several hand grenades were concealed. Cichy, Lot and Olbrzym were all wounded in the firefight.

Due to his injury, Lot's call to withdraw was not loud enough to be heard and as a result the shootout was unnecessarily prolonged, but all the operatives were able to eventually get into their cars and drive away.

The original medevac scheme failed, and a frantic search for a hospital willing to defy the Germans and operate on the heavily wounded Cichy and Lot began. It took several hours and five attempts before a hospital finally admitted them. As a result of the delay, both men died within a couple of days. Meanwhile, Sokół and Juno were intercepted while driving across the Kierbedź Bridge. After a short exchange of fire, they jumped into the Vistula river where they were shot at. Later, according to a German schupo report, the Germans recovered their bodies. Sokol was shot and had his ID with him which later caused German reprisal against his family. Juno drowned, and when his body was recovered he had no documents and could not be identified by the Germans. To help conceal Juno's identity and his connection to Operation Kutschera, the AK later took his railway hat and documents from his family in Piastow and later delivered them to a pro German Blue Police station in the suburb of Grojec city. It is unknown what the Germans did with the bodies they recovered.

== Aftermath ==
The Germans held Kutschera's funeral ceremony in the Brühl palace. His body was then transported to Berlin on a special train. On the next day, 2 February 1944, Germans shot 300 civilian hostages in one of the last public executions in the city before the outbreak of the Warsaw Uprising. Also, Germans imposed a 100 million złoty tribute on Polish residents of Warsaw and Warsaw County.

== In popular culture ==
The assassination of Kutschera was the subject of the 1959 movie Zamach by Jerzy Passendorfer. Every year the operation is commemorated by Polish Scouts.

== See also ==
- Operation Heads
- Operation Bürkl
- Operation Anthropoid
- Street executions in Warsaw (1943–1944)

== Bibliography ==
- Strzembosz, Tomasz (1983). "Akcje zbrojne podziemnej Warszawy 1939–1944" (eng. Armed actions of underground Warsaw 1939-1944) (in Polish). Warszawa: Państwowy Instytut Wydawniczy. ISBN 8306007174.
- Richard C. Lukas "Forgotten holocaust - The Poles under German Occupation 1939-1944" Hippocrene Books 1997 ISBN 0-7818-0901-0
- Andrew Hempel, Poland in World War II: An Illustrated Military History, Hippocrene Books, 2003, ISBN 0-7818-1004-3, Google Print, p.51-56
- (in Polish) Description, map and photos
- (in Polish) Interview with "Kama"
