= Siekiera, motyka =

Polish Resistance military and street-level protest song

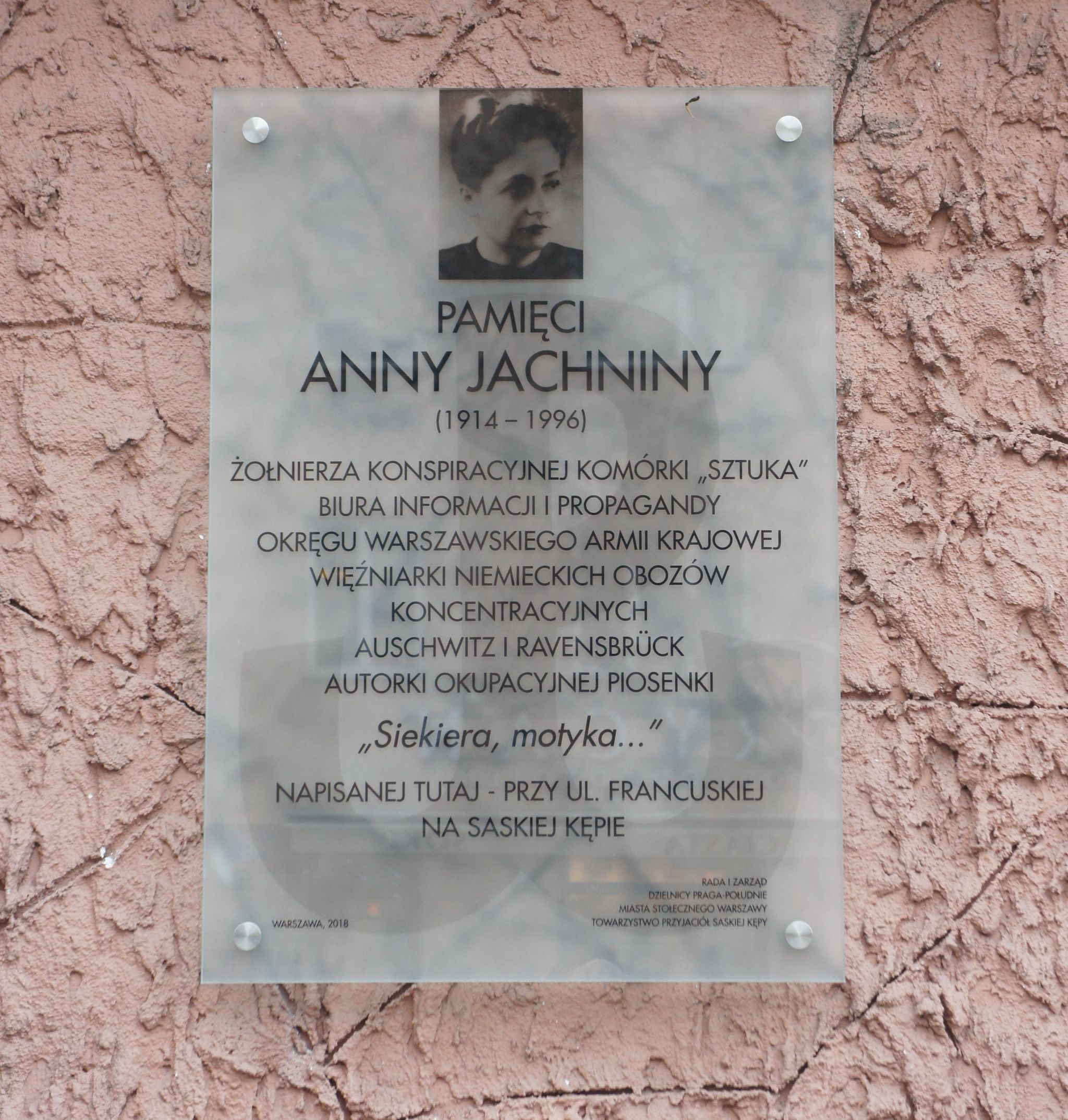
Plaque in Warsaw commemorating Anna Jachnina, with "Siekiera, motyka" quoted at the bottom.

"Siekiera, motyka" (Polish pronunciation: [ɕɛˈkʲɛra mɔˈtɨka], "Axe, Hoe") is a famous Polish Resistance military and street-level protest song from the period of World War II. It became the most popular song of occupied Warsaw, and then, of the entire occupied Poland. The song was inspired by an old humorous folk-tune performed already in 1917 with different and constantly changing lyrics, adapted for the army in a 1938 publication under a different title.

== Creation ==
The wartime lyrics of the song were created around August 1942 in Warsaw, by a member of ZWZ Anna Jachnina, young wife of an army captain from before the invasion. It quickly spawned many variants. In 1943 it was published in print by the Polish resistance underground presses, in the Posłuchajcie ludzie... [Listen, folks], book, one of the bibuła publications of Propaganda Commission (Komisja Propagandy) of Armia Krajowa (Home Army). The music - and in part the lyrics - was based on an existing melody and the words of older songs.

== Performance and influence ==
Germans from late 1942 penalized singing of that song (and similar ones), but sung poetry, ballads and other patriotic songs would remain popular in occupied Poland throughout the period. Siekiera, motyka would remain the most popular patriotic, occupation period street song of occupied Poland.

The song tells about the life in occupied Warsaw. A notable theme of the song, particularly strong in some variants, was the description of German practice of łapanka, the street round-ups of random passers-by.

The song was reprinted in several books and discs after the German occupation ended. The song was also featured in a movie Zakazane piosenki (Forbidden Songs) made in Poland in 1946.

== Lyrics ==
Siekiera, motyka
Axe, hoe

Siekiera, motyka, bimber, szklanka,	Axe, hoe, moonshine, drinking glass,
w nocy nalot, w dzień łapanka,	air raid by night, roundup by day,
siekiera, motyka, światło, prąd,	axe, hoe, lights on, power,
kiedyż oni pójdą stąd.	when will they get out of here.
Już nie mamy gdzie się skryć,	We have no more place to hide,
hycle nam nie dają żyć.	the dogcatchers don't let us live.
Po ulicach gonią wciąż,	they keep chasing through the streets,
patrzą, kogo jeszcze wziąć.	looking, who else to snatch.
Siekiera, motyka, piłka, linka,	Axe, hoe, hand saw, rope line,
tu Oświęcim, (Note: Variants include "tutaj Kurpy", and "tutaj Prusy".) tam Treblinka	here's Oświęcim, there's Treblinka
siekiera, motyka, światło, prąd,	axe, hoe, lights on, power,
drałuj, draniu, wreszcie stąd.	run, you bastard, away from here.
Siekiera, motyka, styczeń, luty,	Axe, hoe, January, February
Hitler z Ducem gubią buty,	Hitler and Duce lose their shoes,
siekiera, motyka, linka, drut,	axe, hoe, rope line, wire,
już pan malarz jest kaput.	Mr. Painter is kaputt.
Siekiera, motyka, piłka, alasz	Axe, hoe, hand saw, liqueur
przegrał wojnę głupi malarz,	stupid painter lost the war,
siekiera, motyka, piłka, nóż,	axe, hoe, hand saw, knife,
przegrał wojnę już, już, już.	he lost the war just now, now, now.
