= Operation "Ukrainian Committee" =

- Part of Operation Heads
Date	March 31, 1944
Location	Warsaw
Result	Successful Operation

Belligerents
Home Army	Ukrainian Central Committee

Commanders and leaders
Włodzimierz Bieżan; Izabela Horodecka	Mykhailo Pogotovko †

Casualties and losses
None	Mykhailo Pogotovko and two unknown guards

Operation "Ukrainian Committee" was a codename for an operation carried out by the Home Army on 31 March 1944. It targeted members of the so-called "Ukrainian Committee" who were collaborating with the Germans.

== Background ==
The Ukrainian Central Committee was the headquarters of the Ukrainian Relief Committees operating in occupied Poland. The Warsaw branch was headed by Lt. Col. Mykhailo Pohotovko, born on 21 November 1891 in Baranov in the Kharkiv Governorate. He had lived in Warsaw since 1923. His deputy was Lieutenant Hryhoriy Doroshenko, born on 23 April 1893 in Ukraine; in the literature he is referred to as Szylo. From 1943, the committee was involved in recruiting people for the infamous SS "Galizien" Division, a SS unit. Mychajło also earned his "bullet" by reporting to the Gestapo.

A counter-intelligence combat unit of the Home Army Headquarters "993/W" was assigned to carry out the sentence. The dissolution of Pohotowka was led by the well-known post-war musician Włodzimierz Bieżan "Klawisz" and the intelligence officer Izabella Horodecka "Teresa" (née Malkiewicz). Bieżan was fluent in Ukrainian. Through his mother, he came into contact with a member of the Ukrainian orchestra at the committee.

A few days before the operation, "Porawa" sent "Klawisz" and "Bomir" to the committee for reconnaissance. While the former had nerves of steel and moved freely among the Ukrainians, the latter was consumed by nerves and fear began to appear in his eyes. "Klawisz" led his friend out of the building, joking with the Ukrainians and at the same time reprimanding him that his behaviour could have cost them both their lives. After this incident, "Bomir" himself approached "Porawa" with a request for a transfer. He found that such situations nerves. "Porawa" not only did not condemn his subordinate, but also appreciated his sincerity. He said that he would hand him over to the intelligence section under the command of "Teresa":

The second chance came on 31 March. The day before, 'Klawisz', who was in the committee, learned that Pohotowko would be staying in his office from the following morning. At about 7.00 a.m. Horodecka and Biezhan arrived at the committee. Through a slightly ajar door in one of the rooms they saw a Ukrainian sitting behind a desk. Biezhan immediately fled to inform the liquidation group by telephone from a nearby room that they had the green light to proceed. The established password was: Can you please pick up the books for the big hell? The reply: "Fine, fine, we'll send someone right away".

The role of 'Teresa' was to ensure that Pohotowko did not leave the building and to inform the liquidation group of his whereabouts. At first, the task seemed nothing special to the experienced intelligence officer. But as time passed, she became increasingly nervous. To make matters worse, she was being watched by a man she did not know. After some time, the Keyblade returned to check that everything was all right. He was horrified to see a group of uniformed Ukrainians eating breakfast in the restaurant hall on the second floor. But there was no way out, the operation had to go on. After a few minutes he went out to meet the liquidators. When he saw the group approaching, he nodded quietly to let them know that they could go into action.

== The Operation ==
The main participants were the Bąka brothers: Cpl. Pachor Bolesław "Szlak", Cpl. Leon "Doktur", Cpl. Stanisław "Burza" and Cpl. Czesław Gwiaździński "Gołąb". "Teresa" showed them the room where Pohotowko was staying. She also asked them to get rid of the man who was watching them, as he could identify them to the Gestapo. At the same time as the Bąka brothers, "Ćwach", "Jastrząb", "Zakalec", "Kieł", "Kurzawa" and "Szaruga" entered the building. The first three terrorised the lobby, preventing anyone from entering the building on the ground floor. The second three took up positions on the mezzanine, covering the escape route. After "Teresa" had left, "Szlak" was the first to enter the chairman's office and fired two pistols at Pohotowki, who tried to cover himself with a telephone receiver. At the same time, "Doktur" liquidates the Ukrainian who is pointed out by "Teresa" who tried to hide under a table. Incidentally, "Storm" does not deny himself the pleasure of "liquidating" Hitler himself, shooting at his picture.

As the action was winding down, a shooting broke out on the ground floor. It is believed that one of the Ukrainian women was thrown at the 'Fang'. As a result of the shooting on the Ukrainian side, two people were killed and two wounded. The unit withdrew without casualties towards Shchylya Street. Although the handing over of the weapons to "Teresa" was supposed to take place in the gate of the tenement houses at 11 Okólnik Street, as she herself recalls, when they spotted her earlier at the corner of Szczygła Street, they were in such a frenzy that it was impossible to tame them, and the handing over of the weapons took place in the street. Unfortunately, while handing over his STEN, 'Doktur' fired all his remaining bullets into the pavement. Fortunately, no one was injured, but the bang was so loud that 'observers' immediately appeared in the windows of nearby tenements. It became impossible to move the gun to the nearby tenement at number 11. "Teresa" decided to put all the weapons in one bag and carry it to "Doktura's" house at Zajcza Street. Meanwhile, the overloaded bag broke, leaving the barrel sticking out. Teresa" also stuffed the gun into her bag. "Zakalac" helped her carry it. A gendarmerie car passed them on the way. But the Germans did not even notice them.

The liquidation of Pohotovka and his deputy was noted by the governor of the Warsaw district, Dr Ludwig Fischer. The periodic report reads: In February 20 Germans were murdered, in March 40. The number of wounded also increased - 55 in February and 41 in March. The number of Poles murdered is also strikingly high. In February 78 Poles were murdered and in March 126 non-Germans, including leading members of the Ukrainian Committee. More importantly, the action gave food for thought to the Ukrainian leadership in Warsaw. As one intelligence report put it: Since the death of Pogotowska there has been a "depression" in the committee and a tendency not to get involved with the Poles.

== Result ==
The head of the committee, Mykhailo Pohotovko, was shot dead by 993/W soldiers in his own office. His deputy and several guards were also killed. The operation was carried out without any casualties.

== Sources ==
- Königsberg, Wojciech (2020). "Akcja "Komitet Ukraiński"". Wokół Ponurego (in Polish).
- Maroński, Mateusz (2020). "Akcja na "Komitet Ukraiński"". www.dws-xip.com (in Polish).
- Strzembosz, Tomasz (1983). Akcje̜ zbrojne podziemnej Warszawy 1939-1944 [Armed actions of underground Warsaw 1939-1944] (in Polish). Warsaw: Wydawnictwo Naukowe. ISBN 83-06-00717-4.
