= Operation Hokki =

World War II military operation

Operation Hokki was a military operation that took place during World War II. The mission's objective was to destroy the railway yards of Petrozavodsk in order to prevent the enemy from supplying its troops in the Battle of Ilomantsi. The mission was conducted by Finland between 31 July 1944 and 31 August 1944 during the Continuation War. Because of the many setbacks that occurred, the objective of the mission was changed and the Finnish troops ended up destroying a large portion of railroad tracks that were being used to supply the Soviet troops in Ilomantsi. Operation Hokki is the only known Finnish airborne operation during World War II and was the largest landing operation in Finnish history.

The mission leader, Captain Ilmari Honkanen fell gravely ill during the mission. Rubber boots also made an abrasion to his foot, which became badly infected, making it impossible for him to return from the mission on foot. He was secretly evacuated with a floatplane after the armistice was signed between Finland and the Soviet Union in September 1944. He received a Mannerheim Cross for his efforts.

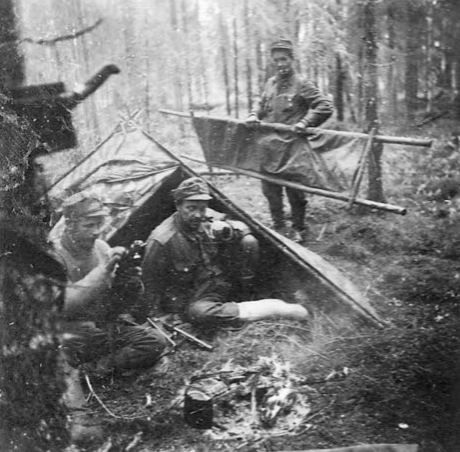
Mission leader, Captain Ilmari Honkanen (center)
