= Ron Jeffery =

British spy

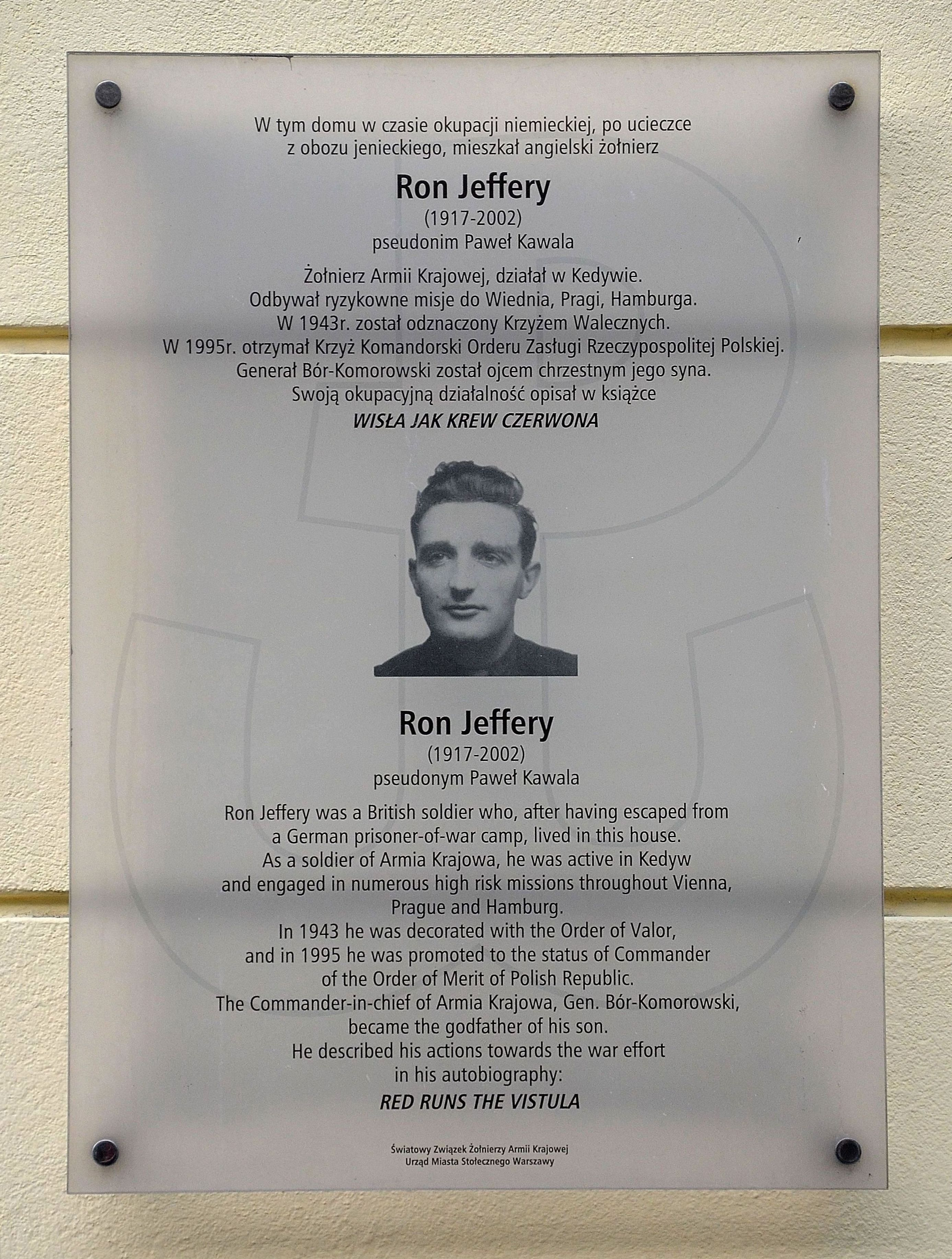
Commemorative plaque at 30 Nowy Świat Street in Warsaw

Ronald Clarence Jeffery (6 September 1917 – 24 September 2002), also Józef Kawala, Stanisław Jasiński, Sporn and Botkin, was an English soldier and an agent of British and Polish intelligence during World War II. Jeffery was described by the Gestapo as "one of the foxiest devils in Europe".

== Biography ==
Ron Jeffery was born on 6 September 1917 in Kent, to an English mother and a New Zealand West Coast miner who settled in England after World War I. Jeffery served as a Lance Corporal in the 6th West Kent Battalion and was captured during the Battle of France by the Wehrmacht in 1940 near Doullens. He was transported to the German prisoner of war camp at Szubin in occupied Poland. Later, Jeffery was moved to Ostrzeszów, renamed by Germans to Schildberg, and from there, travelled with other prisoners of war to the camp in Łódź, named Litzmannstadt under occupation. He escaped twice from two camps and finally joined up with Polish underground members in Warsaw.

Jeffery spoke three languages; German, French and English. Soon after his capture, he began to develop a basic understanding of the Polish language, which made him very useful to Polish underground fighters. Under forged documents issued under false Polish and German names, Jeffery began to serve as a courier in the Polish underground as a part of several missions to occupied cities such as Vienna, Prague, Budapest, Berlin and Hamburg. He was also a member of selective Kedyw groups (patrole), which carried out executions of Nazi collaborators and traitors sentenced by special Underground courts.

On 5 May 1943 while undercover in Warsaw Jeffery married a Polish woman, Marysia Kaziu, daughter of a Warsaw doctor. They had two children, Patrycja, known as Punia, born in Warsaw in December 1943, and Martin, born in London in September 1946. Marysia and Patrycja rejoined Jeffery after the war in September 1945: Jeffery believed that she was questioned by Kim Philby on her arrival at Croydon airport, and that Philby had also been one of the two agents who had questioned him soon after his arrival in London in 1944.

In late 1943, Jeffery came into contact with Boris Smyslovsky, a German colonel of White Russian origins. Smyslovsky wished to induce the western allies to join a Nazi alliance against the Soviet Union, and was prepared to use Jeffery as a go-between. Smyslovsky arranged for Jeffery to be secretly smuggled via Berlin and Oslo to Stockholm in Sweden, from where he was able to fly to the UK in early 1944. He brought with him reports from the Polish underground to the British government: these included details of the Katyn massacre for which at that time (and until 1990) the USSR officially blamed on Germany. His efforts were at first highly regarded but he was subsequently treated with suspicion by many of the British authorities. He was sent back to his previous regiment's former Kent headquarters in Maidstone, where he was obliged to perform only menial duties. Despite his requests, he was not permitted to return to active service on continental Europe in the final months of the war. A disillusioned Jeffery later attributed his treatment specifically to the actions of Kim Philby and other high-ranking Russian agents entrenched in the British system.

After the war, Jeffery migrated from England to New Zealand where he ran a business. There, he compiled his memoirs, Red Runs the Vistula, published in 1985 in New Zealand and in Poland in 2006. His story was also the inspiration for the documentary movie Betrayal by the New Zealand director John Anderson in 1996.

== Decorations ==
- Jeffery was awarded the Armia Krajowa Cross.
- In 1943, Home Army General Tadeusz Bór-Komorowski personally awarded Jeffery the Polish Cross of Valour.
- In 1995, the President of Poland, Lech Wałęsa, awarded him the Commander of the Order or Merit, one of the highest honours the Polish Government can bestow on a foreigner.
