= Forbidden Songs =

1946 Polish musical film

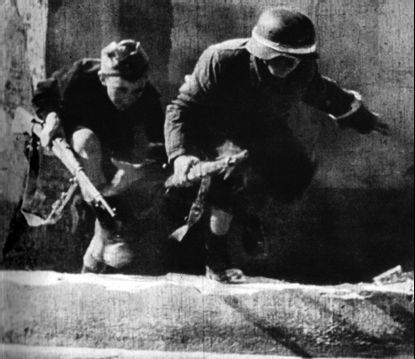
- Still from the film
- Directed by: Leonard Buczkowski
- Written by: Ludwik Starski
- Screenplay by: Jan Fethke, Ludwik Starski
- Cinematography: Adolf Forbert
- Edited by: Róża Pstrokońska
- Music by: Roman Palester
- Production company: Film Polski
- Release date: 1946
- Running time: 92-95 min (two versions)
- Country: Poland
- Language: Polish

Forbidden Songs (Polish: Zakazane piosenki Polish pronunciation: [zakaˈzanɛ pjɔˈsɛnkʲi]) is a 1946 Polish musical film directed by Leonard Buczkowski. It was the first feature film to be created in Poland following the six years of World War II.

== Plot ==
The film, set during the German occupation of Warsaw during the war, tells the story of several inhabitants of the same tenement house. Their stories are loosely tied together by a set of songs, both pre-war ballads popular during the war and war-time popular songs mocking German occupation (Siekiera, motyka)

== Distribution ==
The film's premiere took place on 8 January 1947 in the newly reopened Palladium cinema in Warsaw. The film proved to be highly popular and more than 10.8 million people watched it in the following three years – twice the usual average attendance in post-war Poland.

In 1948 the film was re-edited and re-released in a new version, with more focus on Red Army's role as the “liberator” of Poland and the ‘ally’ of post-war Polish communist regime, as well as more grim outlook of the German occupation of Warsaw and German brutality in general. Main differences:

- place of Roman Tokarski's (main character) narration:
  - 1947 edition—a film studio,
  - 1948 edition—a flat. A former soldier of Polish Armed Forces in the West often blunders when Tokarski tells about German occupation.
- boy singing song against Germans in tram—song ends with words Śpiewać się nie boję, bo mnie nie zrozumią te przeklęte gnoje. (Polish I'm not afraid to sing, because those damn bastards won't understand me):
  - 1947 edition—boy escapes. When a German officer is shouting Ja rozumie! Ja rozumie! Gnoje to my, Deutsche! (broken Polish I understand! I understand! Bastards are we, Deutsche!), all passengers laugh,
  - 1948 edition—German officer shouts Halt! Boy tries to escape, but he is shot by German soldiers.
- German policeman at Tokarski's home:
  - 1947 edition—policeman begins to play piano,
  - 1948 edition—policeman tries to force Tokarski's mother to play the Deutschlandlied, beats and pushes her.
- soldiers of Polish resistance at home of Volksdeutsche Maria Kędziorek (Marie Kentschorek):
  - 1947 edition—they shot her,
  - 1948 edition—movie suggests that they have shaved her head.
- a scene in which a blind accordionist is killed by Polish policeman, was added in 1948 edition.

== Reception ==
However, as the farcical plot and all-familiar songs were mostly free of ideological subtexts, the film remained popular in the decades to come and some of its songs re-emerged in slightly modified form during the 1980s martial law and struggle against the Communist rule. The film remains well-known and popular even in modern Poland, being screened by the public Polish Television (TVP) on a regular basis. Both editions have been published on DVD in Poland, by the Propaganda label, first the 1947 one, as-is, and later the 1948 one, in a digitally restored version.

- In 2020 the film was digitally remastered and made available on 35mm.online.

== Cast ==
- Danuta Szaflarska as Halina Tokarska
- Jerzy Duszyński as Roman Tokarski
- Jan Świderski as Ryszard
- Janina Ordężanka
- Jan Kurnakowicz as Cieślak
- Stanisław Łapiński
- Zofia Jamry as Maria Kędziorek
- Konstanty Pągowski
- Józef Maliszewski
- Hanna Bielicka
- Alina Janowska
- Zofia Mrozowska
- Leon Pietraszkiewicz
- Czesław Piaskowski
- Stanisława Piasecka
- Bronisław Darski
- Helena Puchniewska
- Ludwik Tatarski
- Kazimierz Wichniarz
- Jarosław Skulski
- Edward Dziewoński
- Henryk Szweizer
- Feliks Żukowski as Jurek
- Henryk Modrzewski
- Henryk Borowski
- Stefan Śródka
- Igor Śmiałowski
- Zdzisław Lubelski
- Artur Młodnicki
- Adam Mikołajewski
- Maria Bielicka
- Bolesław Bolkowski
- Janina Draczewska
- Andrzej Łapicki
- Wanda Jakubińska
- Kazimierz Dejunowicz
- Marian Dąbrowski
- Witold Sadowy
