= Operation Bürkl =

1943 Polish resistance operation

- Part of Occupation of Poland (1939–1945)
Date	7 September 1943
Location	Warsaw, General Government (German-occupied Poland)
Result	Polish victory

Belligerents
Polish Underground State	Germany

Commanders and leaders
Jerzy Zborowski	Franz Bürkl †

Strength
5 soldiers	Unknown

Casualties and losses
None	7-9 killed

Operation Bürkl (operacja Bürkl), or the special combat action Bürkl (specjalna akcja bojowa Bürkl), was an operation by the Polish resistance conducted on 7 September 1943. It was the second action of Operation Heads, a series of assassinations of notorious SS officers in Warsaw carried out by the Kedyw's special group Agat ("Anti-Gestapo") between 1943 and 1944, and their first success.

== History ==
The goal of the operation was to "liquidate" Franz Bürkl, a notorious Sicherheitspolizei NCO who had been sentenced to death by the Polish Underground courts for the murder of at least several dozen people. Bürkl was ambushed in broad daylight on the city's main Marszałkowska Street by a group of five young AK partisans armed with Sten submachine guns and Filipinka hand grenades. The assassins, led by 21-year-old Jerzy Zborowski, were recruited for Agat from the underground scouting organization Szare Szeregi. Bürkl and seven other German policemen were killed in the 90-second shoot-out. While the operation resulted in no losses for the resistance, the Nazis killed 20 inmates of Pawiak prison in a public execution in reprisal.

== Bibliography ==
- Strzembosz, Tomasz (1983). "Akcje zbrojne podziemnej Warszawy 1939–1944" (eng. Armed actions of underground Warsaw 1939-1944) (in Polish). Warszawa: Państwowy Instytut Wydawniczy. ISBN 8306007174.

== See also ==
- Operation Kutschera
