= Project Alpha (non-proliferation effort) =

Project Alpha is an academic research project working to counter nuclear proliferation-related trade. It was founded in 2011 with funding from the British Government and is housed in the Centre for Science and Security Studies at King's College London. Its primary mission is to publish independent research findings on illicit trade activities and to support the private and the public sectors with the implementation of international trade controls in order to deter the proliferation of nuclear weapons.

Project Alpha has three main strands of work: understanding illicit trade, countering illicit trade and supporting international efforts of non-proliferation. This includes conducting research of proliferation-related case studies for publication on the Alpha website promoting industry engagement with authorities and providing training and consultancy to businesses in order to encourage good practices of compliance with international regulations governing the export of sensitive goods and technologies. It also supports the work of the International Atomic Energy Agency and the implementation of relevant UN Security Council resolutions, including United Nations Security Council Resolution 1540, aimed at preventing the spread of weapons of mass destruction to non-state actors, and sanctions resolutions adopted against Iran and North Korea.

From September 2015, Project Alpha has been central to the EU's outreach program on dual-use export controls (the EU's P2P program on dual-use goods).

In 2016 Project Alpha published a report on Pakistan's nuclear weapons program which identified a large number of front companies and a suspected new uranium enrichment facility. The report received a great deal of media attention, particularly in South Asia.
