= Operation Heads =

WWII assassinations of Nazi officials in Poland

Operation Heads (Polish: Operacja Główki) was the code name for a series of assassinations of Nazi officials by the World War II Polish Resistance. Those targeted for assassination had been sentenced to death by Polish Underground Special Courts for crimes against Polish citizens during the World War II German occupation of Poland. The operation's code name, literally "Operation Little Heads", was a sardonic reference to the Totenkopf ("Death's Head") insignia on Nazi German SS uniforms and headgear.

== Background ==
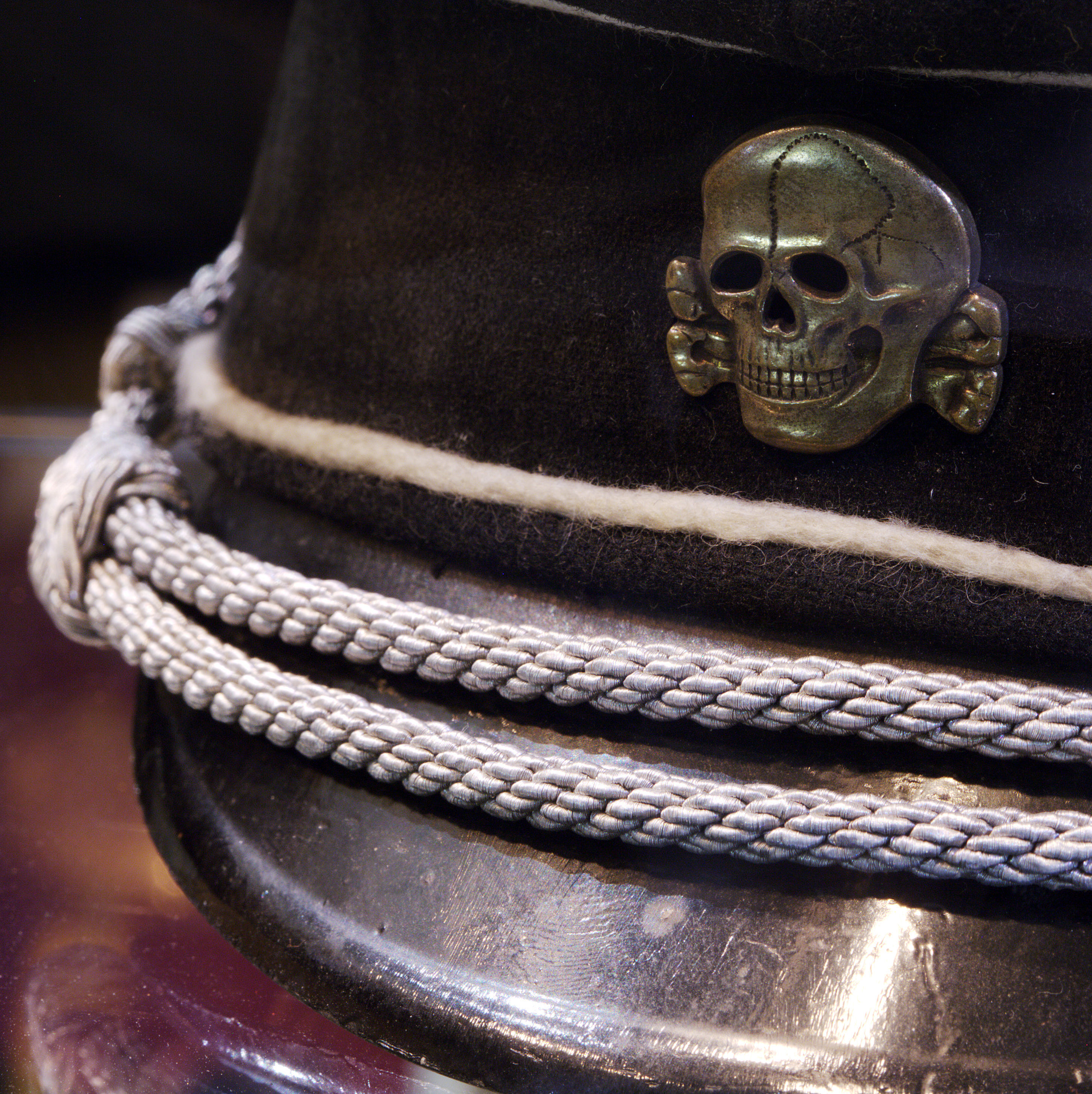
SS cap with Totenkopf: inspiration for "Operation heads" name

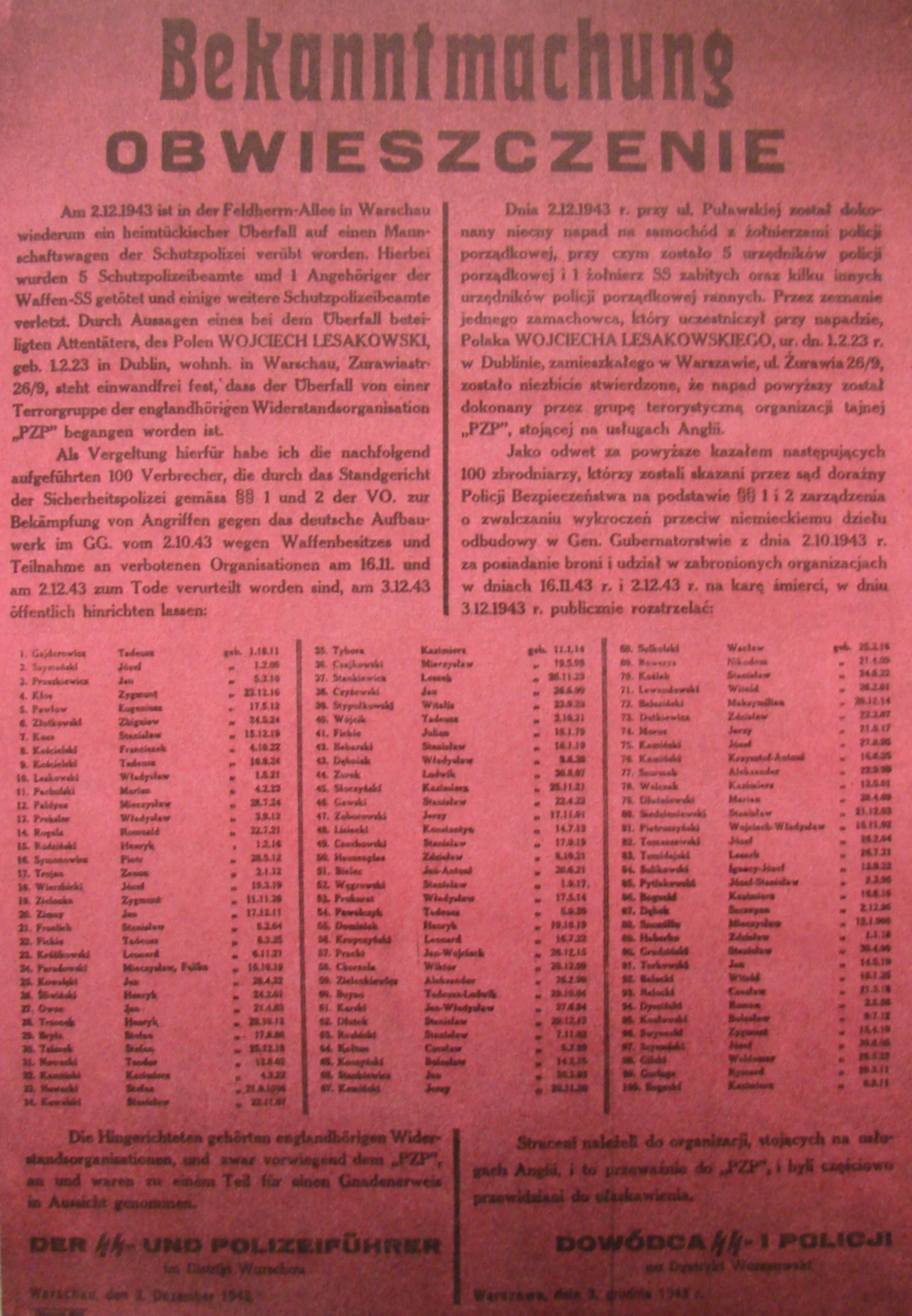
Announcement of execution of 100 Polish hostages in reprisal for assassination of German police and SS by Polish "terrorist organization in English service", Warsaw, 2 October 1943

Operation Heads was the response of Polish Resistance fighters of the Home Army to Nazi terror in Poland. On the streets of Polish cities, the non-Jewish population was targeted by the łapanka policy, in which Nazi forces indiscriminately rounded up, kidnapped and murdered civilians. In Warsaw, between 1942 and 1944, there were approximately 400 daily victims of łapanka. Tens of thousands of these victims were killed in mass executions, including an estimated 37,000 people at the Pawiak prison complex run by the Gestapo and thousands of others killed in the ruins of the Warsaw Ghetto. The Nazis also held public executions of hostages. Daily lists of Poles to be executed in the event of any attack upon Nazi troopers were published. In retribution for these acts of terrorism, the Polish Underground leadership prepared lists of Nazi leaders to be eliminated for the said crimes against civilian non-combatants.

== Operation ==
The targets of this operation were members of the German administration, police, SS, SA, labour office and Gestapo agents who had been sentenced to death by the Underground courts of the Polish Underground for crimes against Polish citizens. Because of the particular brutality of the police, the Home Army killed 361 gendarmes in 1943, and in 1944 another 584. In Warsaw alone 10 Germans were killed daily, which caused repression and revenge from the German side. From August to December 1942, the Home Army carried out 87 attacks on the German administration and members of the occupation forces. In 1943 this number grew radically. During the first four months of 1943, the Home Army increased these attacks to 514.

== Operation Heads 1943–1944 ==
- Anton Hergel was a Nazi commissioner for publications who controlled press and publishers under the General Government. The Polish Resistance fighters wounded him twice in two separate actions, both in 1943.
- Operation Bürkl - Franz Bürkl was an SS-Oberscharführer, member of the Gestapo, and commandant of Pawiak prison. He was killed on September 7, 1943.
- August Kretschmann was an SS-Hauptscharfuhrer and commandant of the Gęsiówka prison camp. He was executed on September 24, 1943.
- Stephan Klein – SS-Scharführer member of Pawiak prison administration. He was killed in 1943 by the Kedyw section of Battalion Parasol.
- Herbert Schultz SS-Obersturmführer assassinated on 6 May 1943 during Operation Schultz,
- Ewald Lange SS-Rottenführer, Gestapo assassinated on 22 May 1943 during Operation Lange by Kedyw section of Battalion Zośka,
- Operation Kutschera - Franz Kutschera was an SS-Brigadeführer and Generalmajor of Polizei, SS and Police Leader of the Warsaw District. He was killed on February 1, 1944 by the Polish home army.
- Ernst Weffels was an SS-Sturmmann member of Nazi personnel of Pawiak prison. He was executed on October 1, 1943 for cruelty and executions in the Women's Prison in Pawiak,
- Ludwig Fischer was Governor of the Warsaw District during the occupation General Government. Shots were fired at his car in Operation Hunting in 1944, but he survived. After the war, he was caught, sentenced to death, and executed by hanging in Poland.
- Albrecht Eitner was a secret agent working for the Abwehr, still under Admiral Canaris. He was executed on February 1, 1944 by the Polish home army.
- Willi Lübbert worked at the unemployment office and organized łapanka (Polish euphemism for rounding up of non-combatants) of Poles to be sent to Nazi labour camps. He was executed on February 1, 1944 by the Polish home army.
- Wilhelm Koppe – Höhere SS und Polizei Führer, HSSP, SS-Obergruppenführer wounded in "Akcja Koppe" (Action Koppe) on 11 July 1944 in Kraków.
- Ernst Dürrfeld had shots fired at his car on July 12, 1944, but he escaped.
- Willy Leitgeber was an officer of section Kripo signed to fight with Polish underground. He was wounded in one action and killed on the second.
- Operation "Ukrainian Committee" - Michajło Pohołowko was a Ukrainian Nazi collaborator from Komitet Ukraiński. He was killed on March 31, 1944.
- Walter Stamm was an SS-Sturmbannführer, IV Department Gestapo, director in Warsaw Sicherheitsdienst. He escaped from Operation Stamm on May 5, 1944.
- Eugen Bollodino worked in the unemployment office and organized łapanka (Polish euphemism for rounding up on the streets of civilians) of Poles to be sent to Nazi labor camps. He was killed in 1944.
- Karl Freudenthal Kreishauptmann of powiat Garwolin responsible for the murder of Jews and Poles, and for the deportation of the local Jewish population to the ghetto. Killed July 5, 1944.

== Bibliography ==
- Strzembosz, Tomasz (1983). "Akcje zbrojne podziemnej Warszawy 1939–1944" (eng. Armed actions of underground Warsaw 1939-1944) (in Polish). Warszawa: Państwowy Instytut Wydawniczy. ISBN 8306007174.
- Richard C. Lukas "Forgotten holocaust - The Poles under German Occupation 1939–1944" Hippocrene Books 1997 ISBN 0-7818-0901-0
- Stachiewicz Piotr, Akcja "Kutschera", Książka i Wiedza, 1987, ISBN 83-05-11024-9.
- Henryk Witkowski, Kedyw okręgu Warszawskiego Armii Krajowej w latach 1943–1944, Fakty i Dokumenty, 1984.

== Internet ==
- (in Polish) maps and photos of some operations
- (in Polish) more on Operacja Główki
