= Operation Alpha =

1944 military operation

Operation Alpha was the US inspired plan, in late 1944, to protect the capital of Yunnan province, Kunming, against a further Japanese offensive.

At this time, the Japanese were successfully executing their own operation, Ichigo, to secure overland routes to Vietnam.

The Allied strategy in China was to support Chinese resistance and maintain them in the war, thus adding pressure on Japanese resources. Resistance to Japanese occupation, however, had been reduced by the hostility between Nationalist and Communist Chinese. Often, the priority for the Nationalists was to maintain or improve their position vis-a-vis the Communists. American advisors urged the factions to unite against the common foe, but their influence was undermined by the Allied inability to provide supplies to the promised level.

Alpha sought to reinforce Chinese units in southeastern China with two Chinese divisions from Burma and the Chinese 53rd Army, already in Yunnan, all retrained and re-equipped for specific campaigns under American direction. The Chinese Generalissimo, Chiang Kai-shek neither accepted nor rejected the plan. The commander of the US China theatre, Major General Albert C. Wedemeyer nevertheless shifted available supplies (delivered via the airlift from Burma and India, called the "Hump") to forces intended for Alpha. At the same time, Wedermeyer merged advisory and training staffs into a single unit, the Chinese Training and Combat Command, under Brigadier General Frank Dorn.

Allied offensives in Burma and China in 1944 had been aimed at lifting the Japanese land blockade and reopening the road supply route from Burma: the first road convoy reached Kunming on 4 February 1945. The easing of the supply problem allowed Wedermeyer to push ahead with building the "Alpha Force" into a proposed 36 division Chinese army by September 1945.

The Japanese had their own plans and attacked on 8 April towards the US air base at Chihchiang. At first, they forced back the Chinese forces but, reinforced by "new" units from the "Alpha Force", the Chinese halted the Japanese by early May. By June they had driven the Japanese back to their start line.

The Chihchiang attack was the last Japanese offensive in China. Thereafter they began to withdraw troops to defend the Japanese homeland (Operation Ketsu-go) and consolidate along the coast. The Chinese moved to the offensive.
