= Witold Pilecki Memorial =

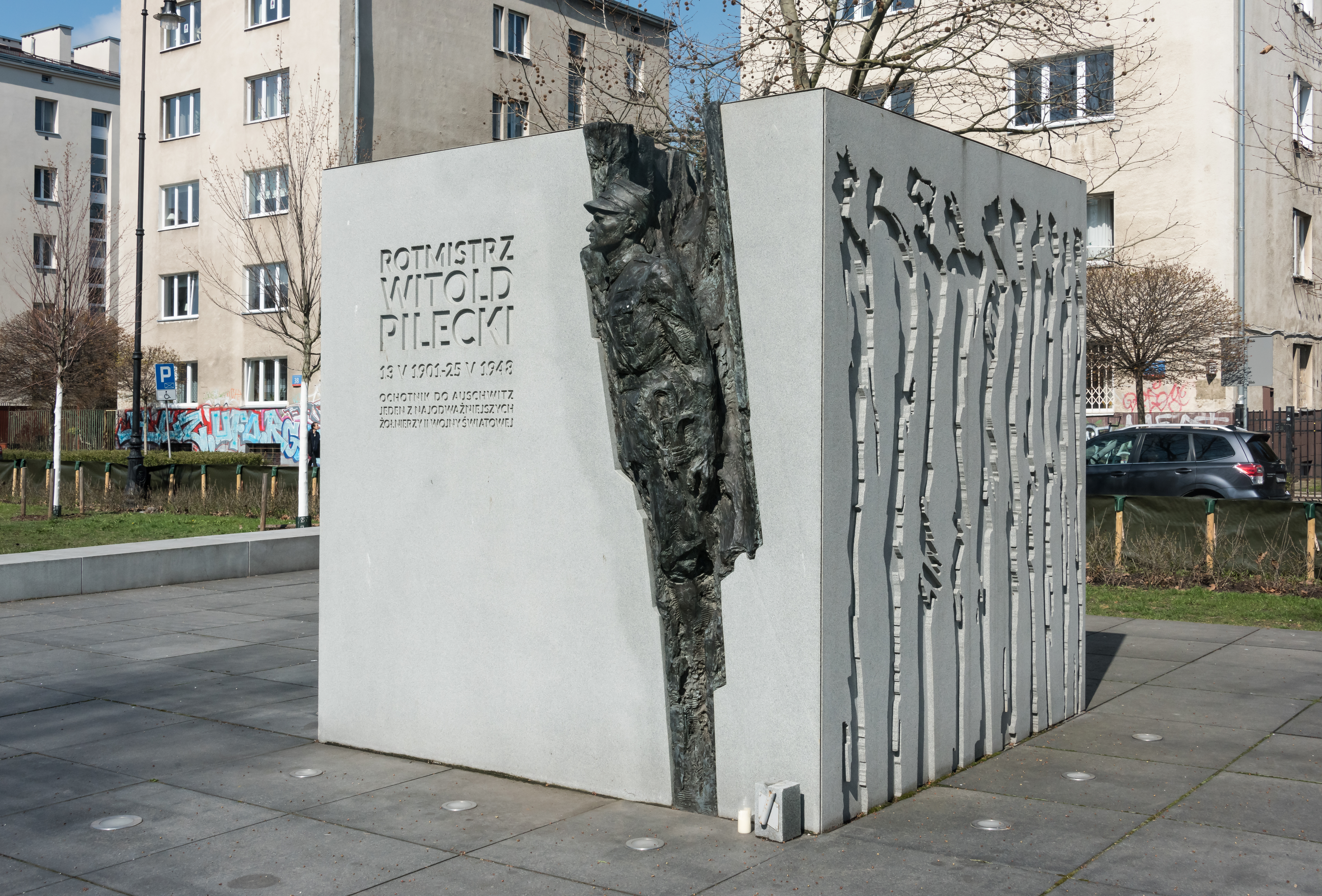
- The monument in 2024.
- Interactive map of Witold Pilecki Memorial
- Location: Polish Armed Forces Avenue, Żoliborz, Warsaw, Poland
- Coordinates: 52°15′49.3″N 20°59′09.8″E
- Designer: Jacek Kiciński; Rafał Stachowicz
- Type: Sculpture
- Material: Granite; bronze
- Opening date: 13 May 2017
- Dedicated to: Witold Pilecki

The Witold Pilecki Memorial (Polish pronunciation: [ˈvi.tɔlt piˈlɛt͡s.ki]; Polish: Pomnik Witolda Pileckiego) is a monument in Warsaw, Poland, located at the intersection of Polish Armed Forces Avenue and Bitwy pod Rokitną Street, within the Żoliborz district. It is dedicated to Witold Pilecki, a Polish cavalry officer, intelligence agent, and resistance leader during the Second World War. The monument has the form of a large granite cube, with a bronze relief of Pilecki installed within it. It was designed by Jacek Kiciński and Rafał Stachowicz and unveiled on 13 May 2017.

== History ==
The monument was proposed in 2013 by the organization Youth for Poland. The same year, it was approved by the Warsaw City Council. It was designed by Jacek Kiciński and Rafał Stachowicz, and unveiled on 13 May 2017, at the intersection of Polish Armed Forces Avenue and Bitwy pod Rokitną Street. It was placed near the tenement at 30 Polish Armed Forces Avenue, the former house of Witold Pilecki, and the location of his arrest by the German forces, from where he was sent to the Auschwitz concentration camp.

== Design ==
The monument is placed at the intersection of Polish Armed Forces Avenue and Bitwy pod Rokitną Street, near the tenement at 30 Polish Armed Forces Avenue, the former house of Witold Pilecki, and a location of his arrest by the German forces, from where he was sent to the Auschwitz concentration camp. The sculpture has a form of a light grey granite cube. On the left side of its front wall, it features an indented V-shaped crevasse, lied in bronze, and featuring a reilef of Witold Pilecki emerging from it, wearing a military uniform of a rogatywka hat. It symbolises the achievement of the freedom of independence. Next to it, is also inscribed the following text in Polish:

Polish inscription

Rotmistrz
Witold
Pilecki
13 V 1901–25 V 1948
Ochotnik do Auschwitz
Jeden z najodważniejszych
żołnierzy II wojny światowej

Translation:
English translation

Rittmaster
Witold
Pilecki
13 May 1901 – 25 May 1948
The volunteer who went to Auschwitz
One of the bravest
soldiers of the Second World War

Its right wall features numerous vertical fractures, symbolizing others who also fought for the independence of Poland. The opposite side features the following Polish inscription:

Polish inscription

Harcerz, oficer Wojska Polskiego.
Odznaczony dwukrotnie Krzyżem Walecznych.
Uczestnik wojny polsko-bolszewickiej 1919–1921 oraz kampanii wrześniowej 1939.
Żołnierz konspiracji niepodległościowej: Tajnej Armii Polskiej, Związku Walki Zbrojnej – Armii Krajowej.
Dobrowolny więzień niemieckiego obozu KL Auschwitz od 21/22 IX 1940 do 26/27 IV 1943.
Organizator Wojskowej Konspiracji Obozowej.
Po brawurowej ucieczce z obozu oficer Kedywu Komendy Głównej AK.
Uczestnik Powstania Warszawskiego.
Jeniec Stalagu 344 Lamsdorf i Oflagu VII a Murnau.
Po wyzwoleniu oficer II Korpusu Polskiego.
Na polecenie gen. Władysława Andersa powrócił do Polski 8 XII 1945.
Aresztowany przez reżim komunistyczny 8 V 1947.
Poddany brutalnemu śledztwu, skazany został w sfingowanym procesie na karę śmierci.
Zamordowany strzałem w tył głowy 25 V 1948 w więzieniu przy ulicy Rakowieckiej w Warszawie.
Pogrzebany w miejscu nieoznaczonym, prawdopodobnie w Kwaterze „Ł” Cmentarza Wojskowego na Powązkach.
30 VII 2006 odznaczony przez Prezydenta RP Lecha Kaczyńskiego Orderem Orła Białego.
5 IX 2013 awansowany przez Ministra Obrony Narodowej Tomasza Siemoniaka na stopień pułkownika.

Translation:
English translation

Scout, the officer of the Polish Armed Forces.
Twice decorated with the Cross of Valour.
A participant of the Polish–Soviet War of 1919–1921, and the September Campaign of 1939.
A soldier of the pro-independence conspiracy: Secret Polish Army, Union of Armed Struggle–Home Army.
Voluntary prisoner of KL Auschwitz from 21/22 September 1940 to 26/27 April 1943.
The organizator of the Camp Military Conspiracy.
After the daring escape from the camp, an officer of the Directorate of Sabotage of the Home Army Headquarters.
A participant of the Warsaw Uprising.
A prisoner of the Stalag 344 Lamsdorf, and Oflag VII-A Murnau.
Following the liberation, an officer of the 2nd Polish Corps.
From orders of general Władysław Anders, he returned to Poland on 8 December 1945.
Arrested by the communist regime on 8 May 1947.
Subjected to a brutal investigation, he was sentenced to death in a fake trial.
He was murdered with a shot to the back of his head on 25 May 1948, in the prison near Rakowiecka Street in Warsaw.
He was buried in an unknown location, probably at the Burial Plot Ł at the Powązki Military Cemetery.
On 30 July 2006, he was decorated with the Order of the White Eagle, by the President of the Republic of Poland, Lech Kaczyński.
On 5 September 2013, he was promoted to the rank of colonel by the Minister of National Defence, Tomasz Siemoniak.

== Gallery ==
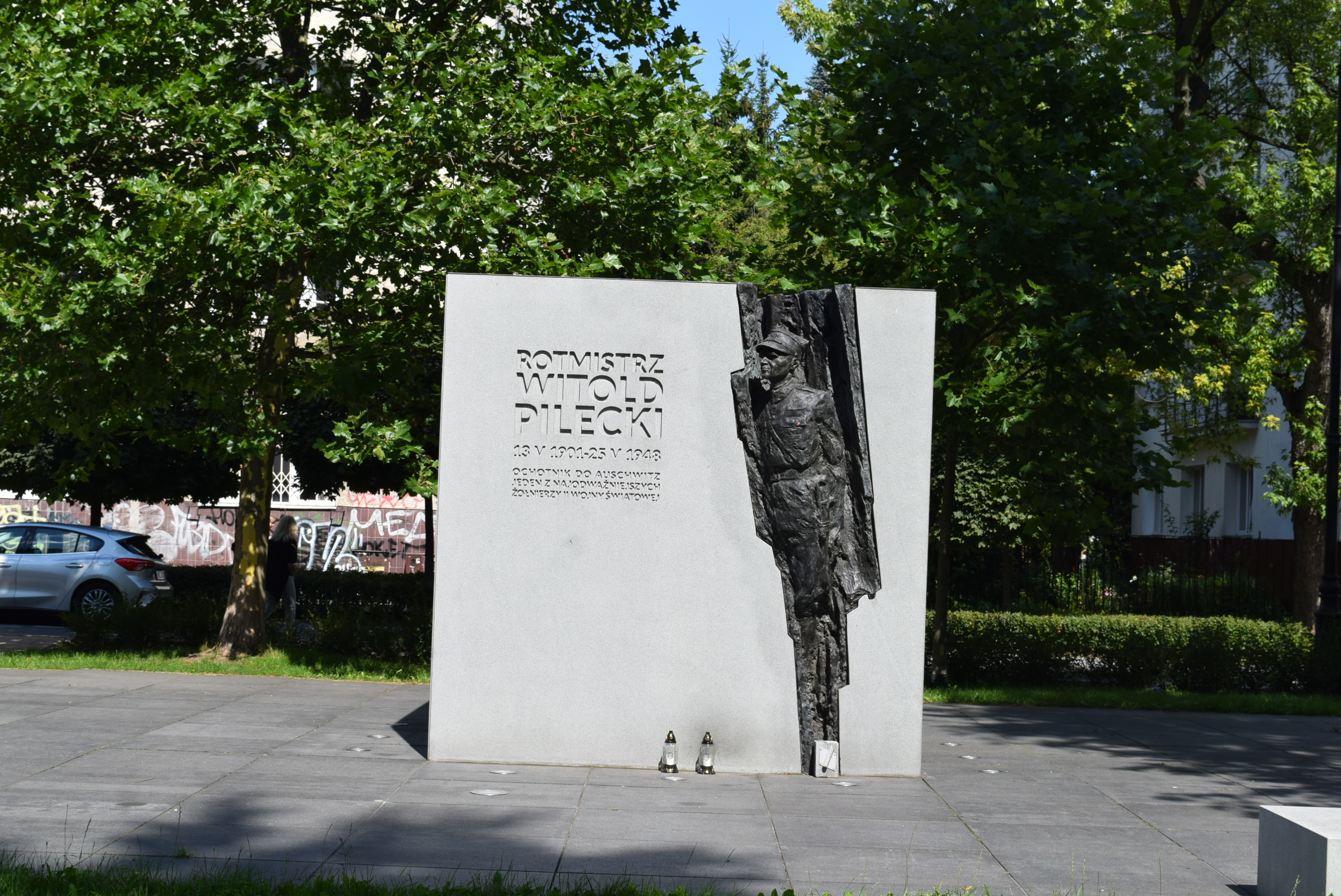
The front of the monument, with the relief of Witold Pilecki.

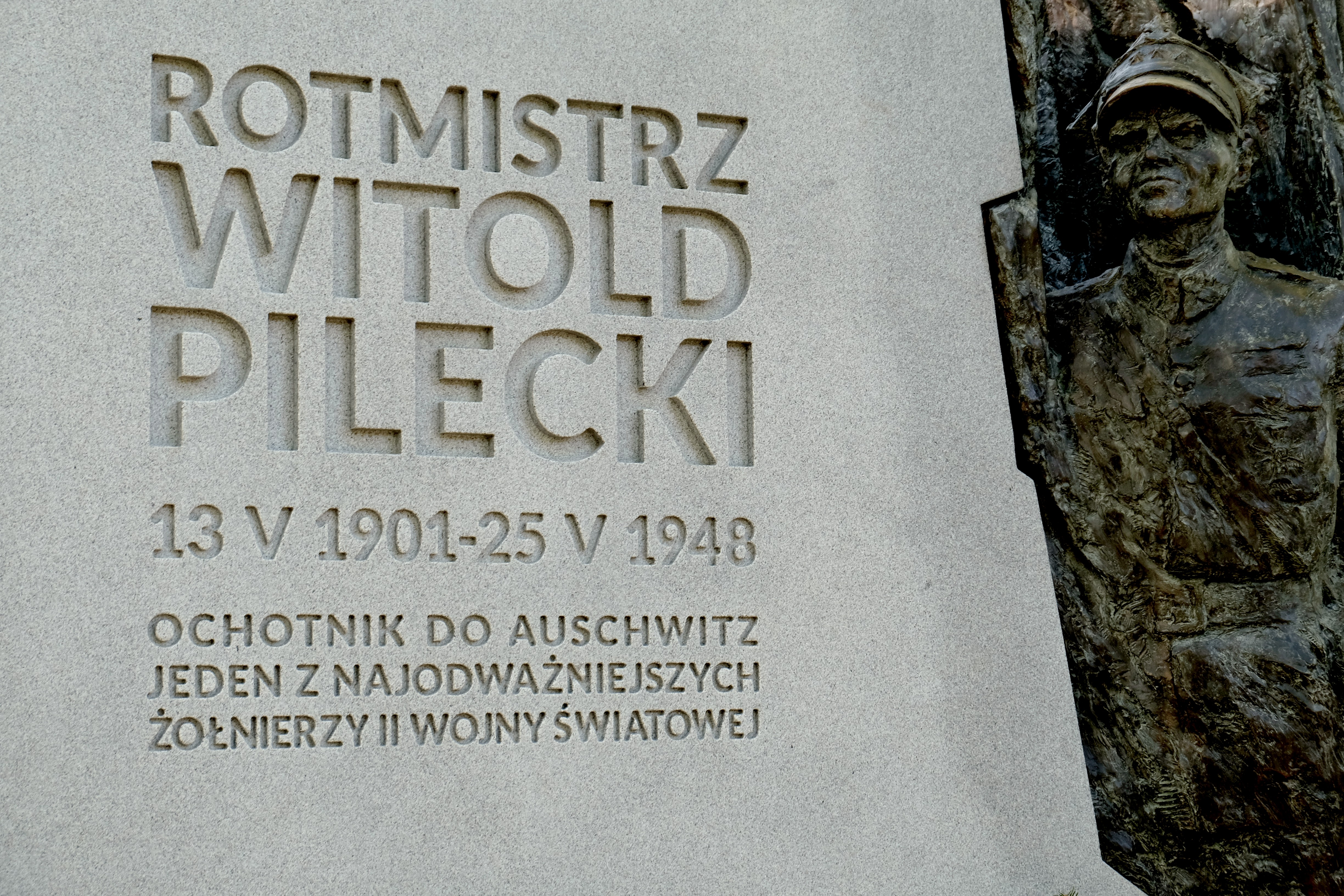
The inscription at the front of the monument.

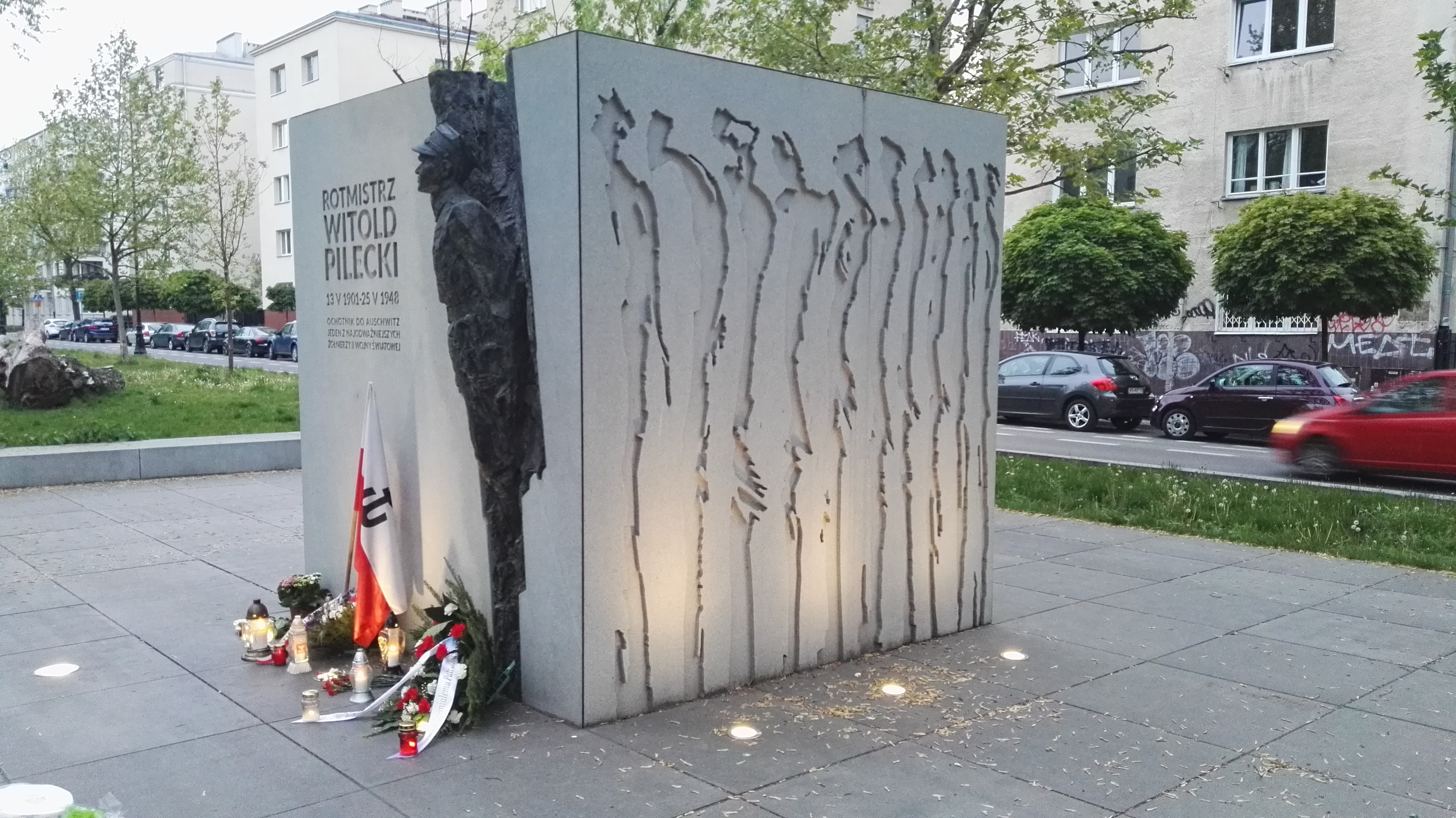
The right side of the monument, with several vertical fractures.

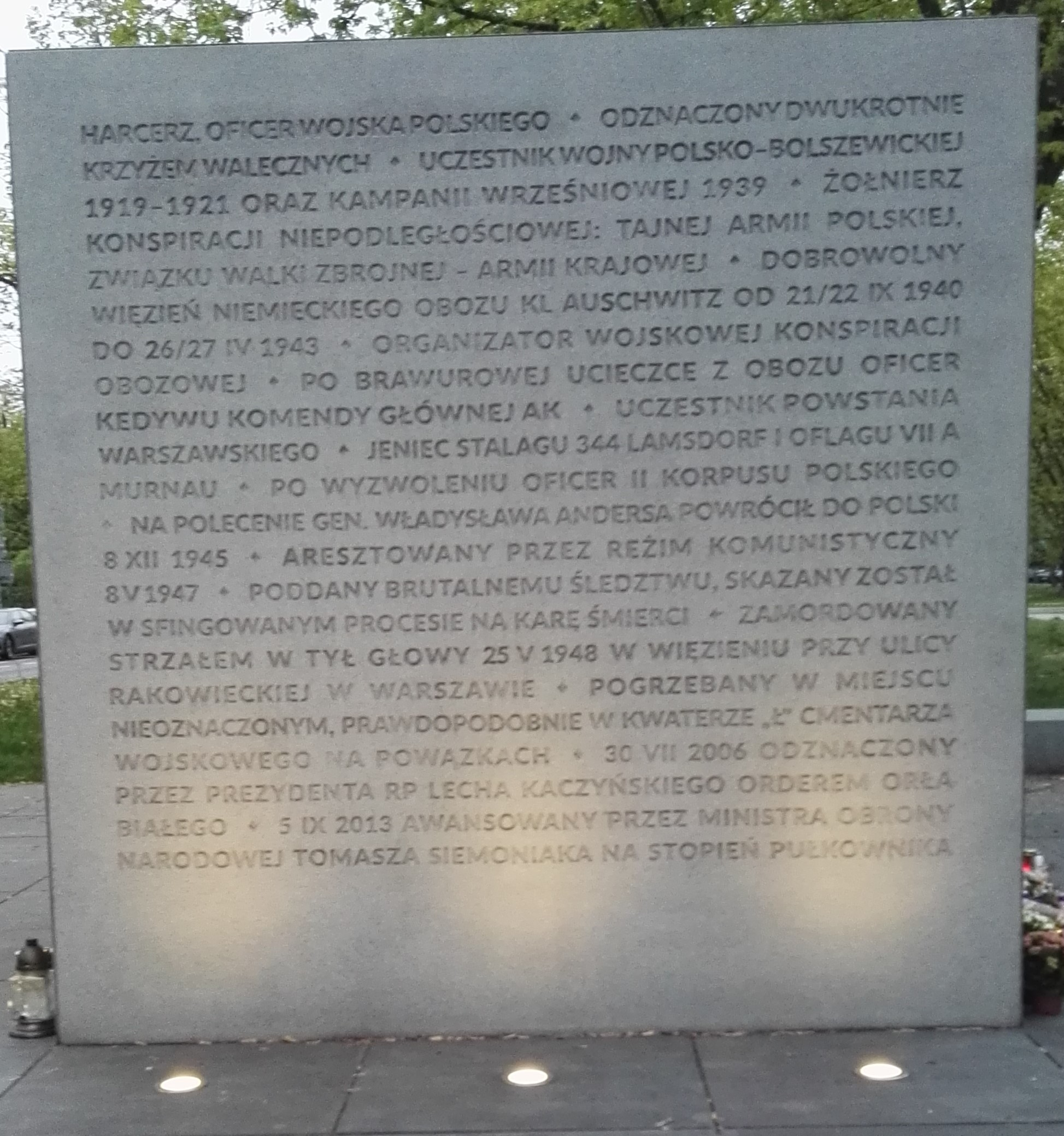
The inscription on the left wall.
