= Military Organization Union =

Underground resistance organization in 1940

- Związek Organizacji Wojskowej; ZOW
- Leader: Tomasz Serafiński
- Founded: 1940
- Country: Nazi Germany
- Allegiance: Home Army
- Active regions: Gau Upper Silesia
- Part of: Resistance movement in Auschwitz

The Military Organization Union (Polish: Związek Organizacji Wojskowej; Polish pronunciation: [ˈzvjɔ̃zɛk ɔrɡaɲiˈzat͡sji vɔj'skɔvɛj], ZOW) was an underground resistance organization formed by Witold Pilecki at Auschwitz concentration camp in 1940.

== Beginning ==
Auschwitz concentration camp photos of Witold Pilecki, ZOW founder

In 1940, Witold Pilecki, a member of the Polish resistance organisation Secret Polish Army (TAP), later known as the Home Army (AK), presented a plan to enter the Nazi's Auschwitz concentration camp, gather intelligence from the inside, and organize inmate resistance. His superiors approved this plan and provided him with a false identity card in the name of "Tomasz Serafiński". On 19 September 1940, he deliberately went out during a łapanka in Warsaw, and was caught by the Germans along with other civilians and sent to Auschwitz. He was the only known person ever to volunteer to be imprisoned in Auschwitz.

== Forming ZOW in Auschwitz ==
In the camp Serafiński (Prison Number 4859), as Pilecki was now known, began the work of organising the ZOW. The Union would become the Auschwitz branch of the AK and its aims were to improve inmate morale, provide news from outside, distribute extra food and clothing, and set up intelligence networks.

ZOW was organized in a cell network of "Fives", whereby all five agents knew nothing about their comrades. The first "Five" was formed out of Pilecki's TAP members, various captured soldiers of the Polish army. It included: Dr. Władysław Dering - number 1723, Lieutenant-Colonel Władysław Surmacki - number 2795, Jerzy Hlebowicz - the false name of Captain Jerzy de Virion - number 3507, Eugeniusz Obojski - number 194 and Roman Zagner - number unknown. This group was nicknamed the "High Five" of ZOW. Its commander was Lieutenant-Colonel Władysław Surmacki.

By 1941 ZOW had grown substantially with "High Five" creating numerous sub-groups. Despite being an arm of the Polish resistance, membership was not limited to Poles, though Jewish members had a much lower life expectancy since the Germans prioritized exterminating Jews over Polish prisoners. Notable members of ZOW included the famous Polish sculptor Xawery Dunikowski and ski champion Bronisław Czech.

ZOW members worked in the camp's SS administration office (Mrs. Rachwalowa, Capt. Rodziewicz, Mr. Olszowka, Mr. Jakubski, Mr. Miciukiewicz), the [magazines] (Mr. Czardybun), and the Sonderkommando, which burned human corpses (Mr. Szloma Dragon and Mr. Henryk Mendelbaum). The organisation had its own system of enforcing order (with a secret criminal court), as well as supply lines to the outside. Thanks to civilians living nearby, the organisation regularly received medical supplies. Inmates even constructed a radio receiver and hid it in the camp hospital.

Many smaller and non-Polish underground organisations at Auschwitz eventually merged with ZOW. In the autumn of 1941, Colonel Jan Karcz was transferred to the newly created Birkenau death camp, where he proceeded to organise more ZOW structures. By the spring of 1942, the organization had over 1,000 members, including women and people of other nationalities, at most sub-camps.

Meanwhile, the Gestapo redoubled its efforts to ferret out ZOW members, and from late 1942 succeeded in killing many of them.

== Intelligence ==
From October 1940, ZOW sent numerous reports about the camp and its means of genocide to the Polish resistance's Home Army Headquarters in Warsaw. ZOW's first report reached the Polish resistance in November 1940. A shortwave transmitter hidden in Block 11 also sent information directly to the Polish government-in-exile in London. Beginning March 1941, Pilecki's reports were being forwarded via the Polish resistance to the government in exile and onwards to the British government and other Allied nations. These reports were the first about the Holocaust and a principal source of intelligence on Auschwitz for the Western Allies. Nonetheless, those reports were discarded as "too extreme" by Allied intelligence chiefs for much of the war.

== Unrealized plans for an uprising ==
Pilecki planned for the liberation of the camp, hoping that the Allies would drop arms or troops into Auschwitz (such as the Polish 1st Independent Parachute Brigade, based in Britain), or that the Home Army could organize an assault by land. Pilecki's agents trained meticulously for their chance to seize the camp from their guards at the hint of Allied relief.

Nevertheless, by 1943 Pilecki had realized no possibility of rescue existed from outside the camp. Deciding to break out of the camp, and hoping to personally convince the Home Army that a rescue attempt was a valid option, when he was assigned to a night shift at a camp bakery outside the fence, he and two comrades overpowered a guard, cut the phone line and escaped on the night of 26–27 April 1943, taking along documents stolen from the Germans. In the event of capture, they were prepared to swallow cyanide. After several days, with the help of local civilians, they contacted a Home Army unit. Pilecki submitted another detailed report on conditions at Auschwitz which was forwarded to London, but the British authorities refused air support for an operation to help the inmates escape. The British considered air raids to be too risky, and Home Army reports on Nazi atrocities at Auschwitz were deemed to be gross exaggerations. In turn, the Home Army decided that it was not able to storm the camp by itself.

In October 1944, ZOW aided the Jewish Sonderkommando revolt at the camp (7 October 1944), providing the explosives for the uprising.

== Post-War Communist Poland ==
On 8 May 1947, Pilecki was arrested by the Polish Ministry of Public Security. He was accused of illegal border crossing, use of forged documents, not enlisting with the military, carrying illegal arms, espionage and working for "foreign imperialism," and preparing the assassination of several officials. On 25 May 1948, Pilecki was executed at the Warsaw Mokotów Prison. Until 1989, information on his exploits and fate was suppressed by the Polish communist regime.

== Bibliography ==
- E. Ciesielski, Wspomnienia Oświęcimskie [Auschwitz Memoirs], Kraków, 1968.
- Jozef Garlinski, Fighting Auschwitz: the Resistance Movement in the Concentration Camp, Fawcett, 1975, ISBN 0-449-22599-2, reprinted by Time Life Education, 1993. ISBN 0-8094-8925-2
- W. Gawron, Ochotnik do Oświęcimia [Volunteer for Auschwitz], Calvarianum, Auschwitz Museum, 1992.
- Jon E. Lewis (1999). The Mammoth Book of True War Stories. Carroll & Graf. p. 389. ISBN 978-0-7867-0629-7.
- Konstanty Piekarski, Escaping Hell: the Story of a Polish Underground Officer in Auschwitz and Buchenwald, Dundurn Press Ltd., 1990. ISBN 1-55002-071-4.
- Wiesław Jan Wysocki, Rotmistrz Pilecki, Pomost, 1994. ISBN 83-85209-42-5.
- Adam Cyra, Wiesław Jan Wysocki, Rotmistrz Witold Pilecki, Oficyna Wydawnicza VOLUMEN, 1997. ISBN 83-86857-27-7.
- Adam Cyra, Ochotnik do Auschwitz - Witold Pilecki 1901-1948 [Volunteer for Auschwitz], Oświęcim 2000. ISBN 83-912000-3-5
- Adam Cyra, Spadochroniarz Urban [Paratrooper Urban], Oświęcim 2005.
