= Sukurčy =

Former village

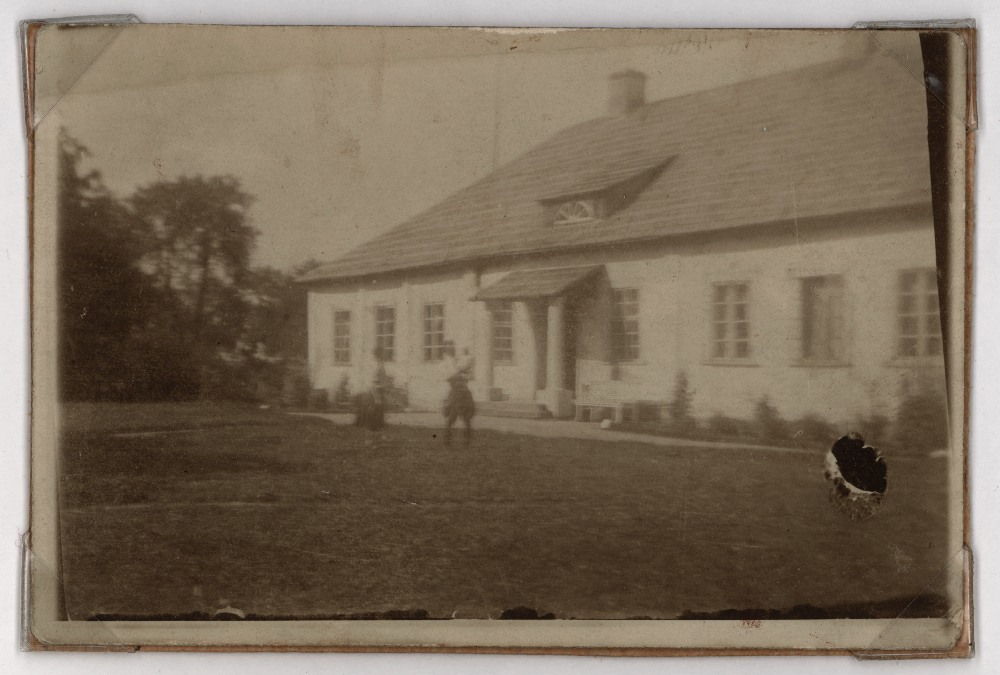

Sukurčy (Belarusian: Сукурчы) (polish : Sukurcze) near Lida in Belarus is a former village and the estate of Witold Pilecki. It was destroyed by communists after the Second World War.
