= Jędrusie =

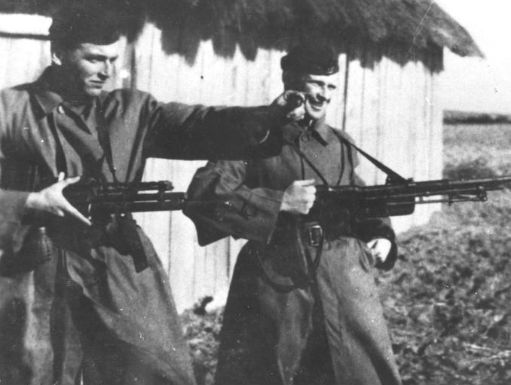
- Partisans from "Jędrusie" unit during patrol – Andrzej Skowroński "Andrzej" and "Inspektor"
- Active: 1941–1945
- Disbanded: 1945
- Country: Poland
- Allegiance: Polish Underground
- Branch: Armia Krajowa (Home Army), Szare Szeregi
- Type: Underground, partisan and diversion unit
- Engagements: Operation Tempest

Commanders
- Notable commanders: Lt. Władysław Jan Jasiński "Jędruś"

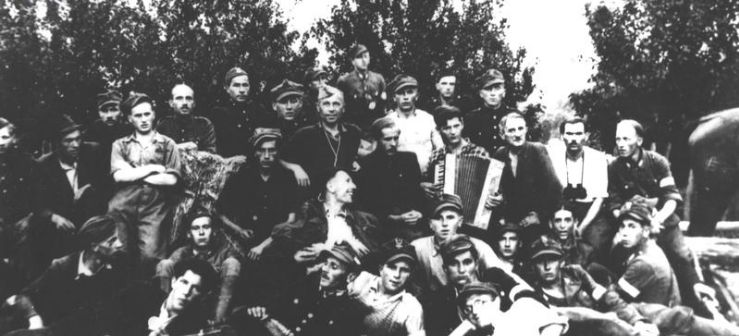
"Jędrusie" with instruments

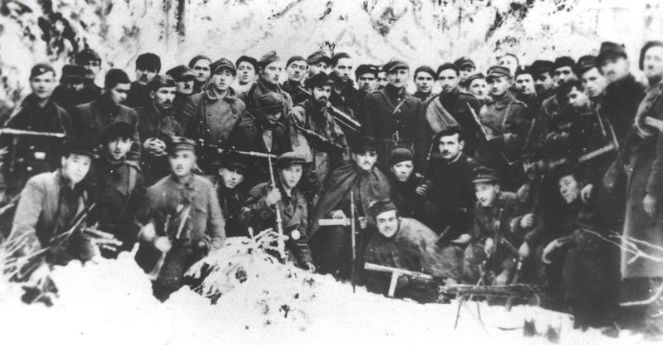
...and with guns

Jędrusie (literally Little Andrews) was a Polish underground guerrilla group during World War II, created in 1941.

== History ==
Its origins go back to October 1939 in Tarnobrzeg, when a group of Polish Boy Scouts and gymnasium students joined the Polish resistance. Initially a small sub-group of Szare Szeregi, since 1940 it was named Odwet (Vengeance). In 1941 the unit was reformed by and named after Lt. Władysław Jasiński, whose nom de guerre was Jędruś, after his 4-year-old son Andrzej (Jędruś is a Polish diminutive of that name). Jasiński, a reserve lieutenant of the Polish Army, was also their school teacher and the leader of their scouting troop.

The Jędrusie were active in Kraków, Sandomierz, Tarnobrzeg, Opatów, Rzeszów, Mielec and other areas of Central Poland and carried over a variety of tasks related to sabotage and diversion. Initially engaged mostly in training, reconnaissance, intelligence and distribution of underground press, since 1941 the group also started to organize armed resistance. The reason for that was the dire need to hide a number of members from the Germans and hide them in the countryside to avoid their arrest and execution. Among the notable actions of the early period were attacks on German-confiscated factories and farms. Jasiński was killed in action on January 9, 1943, and his place was taken by J. Wiącek Sowa. Jędrusie also organized material help for the families of resistance fighters, prisoners of war and concentration camp inmates, collected food for the prisoners held in POW camps, served as a criminal police in the areas of its operation and organized underground education, with secret schools preparing for a secret matura and underground NCO schools for military training.

On March 12, 1943, the Jędrusie assaulted the German Gestapo prison in Opatów and liberated more than 55 people held there. On March 29 of the same year a similar action was carried out in Mielec, where the unit collaborated with a local Armia Krajowa unit in liberating 180 people from a local prison. Since then the unit was unified with the Home Army and entered its ranks as the 4th company of the 2nd Home Army Infantry Regiment of the Land of Sandomierz.

After the start of the Operation Tempest in 1944, the unit fought together with the rest of the regiment against the German forces defending the bridgehead near Baranów and Sandomierz against the Red Army. It also liberated a number of towns in the area. At that time the unit numbered some 250 fully equipped soldiers in the first line. Apart from the Polish boys, it included also a number of Jews hiding from the Germans, as well as French and Russian POW camp escapees and even a number of deserters from the Wehrmacht.

== After World War II ==
After the war many of the former Jędrusie members were persecuted by the NKVD and the communist authorities of Poland. Most of the fallen soldiers were exhumed in the 1950s and interred together with the first commander of the unit.

== Bibliography ==
- Jerzy Ślaski, Polska walcząca 1939–1945, Warszawa 1985
- Eugeniusz Dąbrowski, Gdy bój się już skończy ...: upamiętnione miejsca działalności tajnej organizacji "Odwet-Jędrusie" 1939-1945, Warszawa 1989
- Eugeniusz Dąbrowski, Szlakiem "Jędrusiów", Kraków 1992
- Aleksandra Janas, Adam Wójcik [oprac.], Odwet – Jędrusie: legenda Ziemi Tarnobrzeskiej, Tarnobrzeg 1993.
- Włodzimierz Gruszczyński, Odwet – Jędrusie: próba monografii, Staszów 1995
- Mieczysław Korczak, Życie na Włosku, Staszów 1997
- Wojciech Źródlak, Adam Molenda, Kronikarz podłych lat. Czesław Molenda (1911–1982). [w:] „Biblioteka [Kroniki m. Łodzi], tom 2, Łódź 2007, ss. 46 – 65 [Cz. Molenda, członek oddz. "Jędrusie" oraz współredaktor "Odwetu"].
