= Polish resistance movement in World War II =

- Part of resistance during World War II and the Eastern Front of World War II
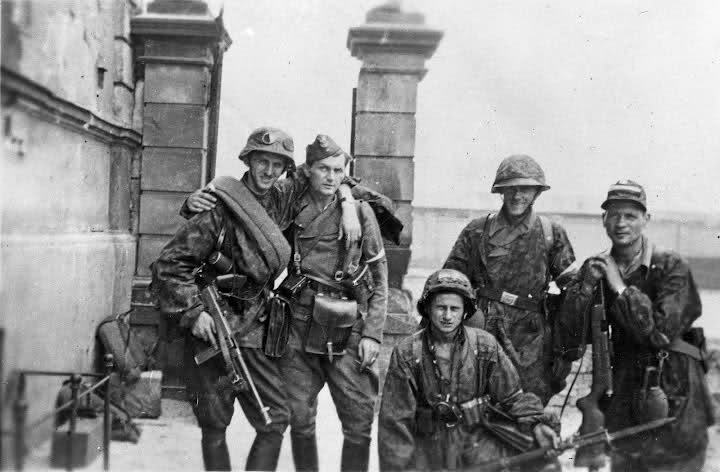
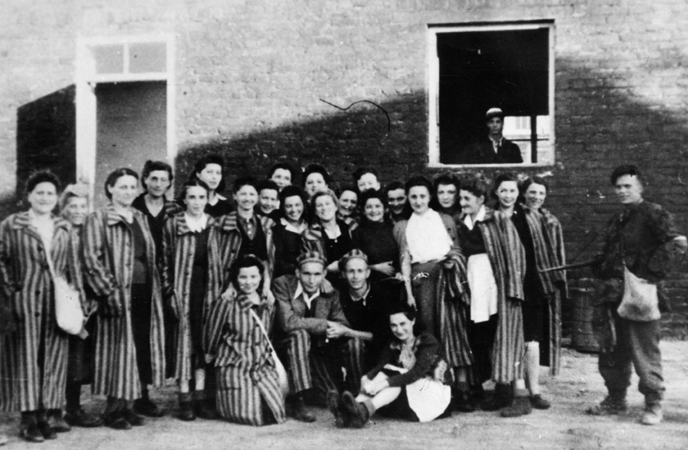
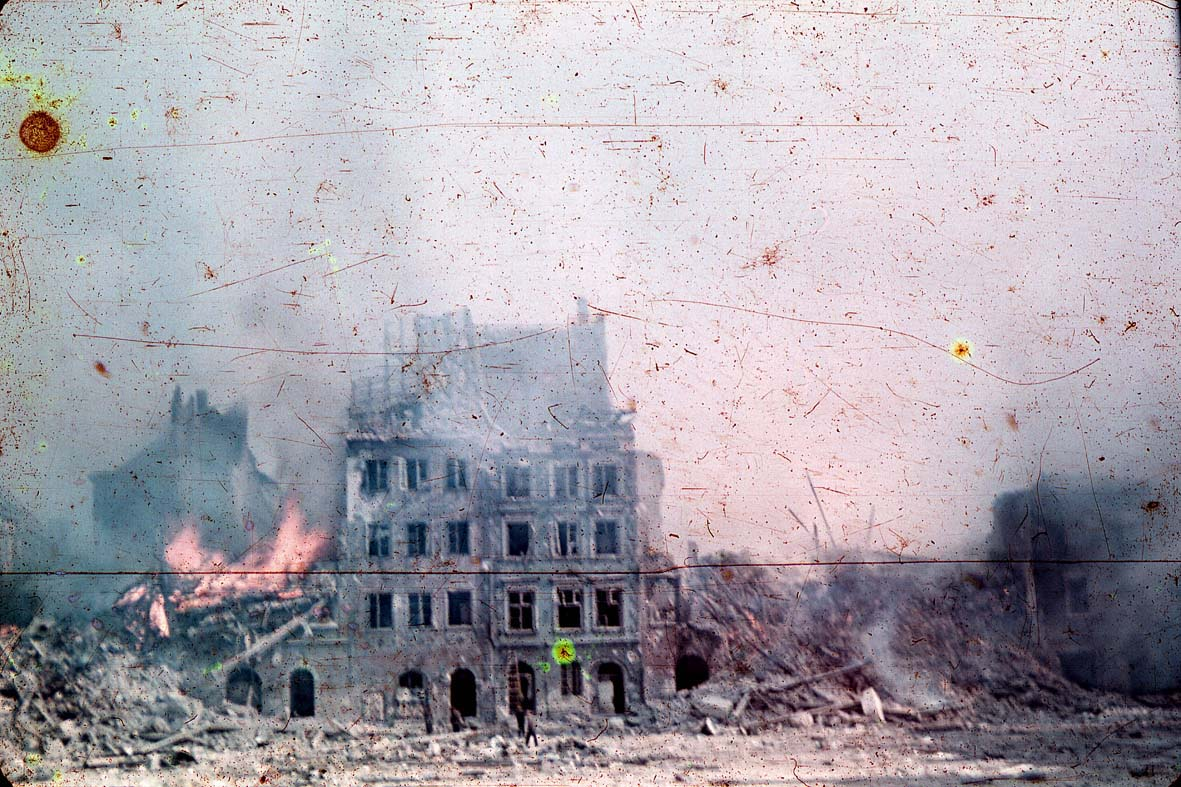
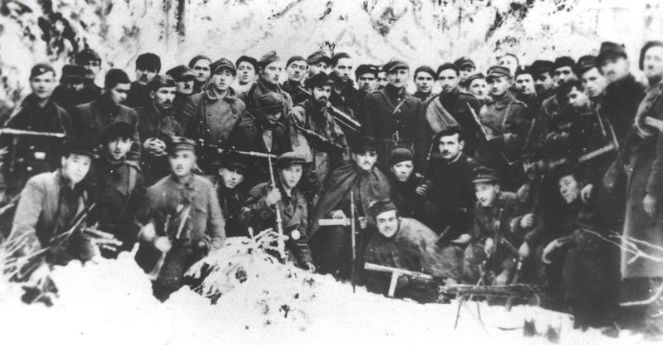
- Sequentially from top: soldiers from Kolegium "A" of Kedyw on Stawki Street in Wola district, during the Warsaw Uprising, 1944; Jewish prisoners of Gęsiówka concentration camp liberated by Polish Home Army soldiers from "Zośka" Battalion, 5 August 1944; Polish partisans of "Jędrusie" unit in Kielce area, 1945; Old Town of Warsaw in flames during Warsaw Uprising
Date	27 September 1939 – 25 July 1945 (anti-communist resistance continued until 1953)
Location	Poland, present-day Lithuania, Belarus, Ukraine.
Result	Polish victory: Contribution to Allied forces; Restoration of Polish statehood after occupation; Sovietization of Poland, imposition of a communist puppet government and reduction of Poland to a Soviet satellite state until 1989; Liquidation of the Polish Home Army and other anti-Nazi resistance movements by the Soviet secret police; Continued anti-communist resistance
Territorial changes	Borders of Poland altered; prewar eastern territories of Poland ceded to the Soviet Union in exchange for former German territories in the West

Belligerents
Germany: Lithuanian Auxiliary Police; Ukrainian Auxiliary Police; Polish collaborators; Soviet Union (1939–1941; after 1944 against non-Communists only) Ukrainian Insurgent Army (1943–1945)	Polish Underground State: Home Army (Note: Started as Service for Poland's Victory in September 1939 and reformed into the Union of Armed Struggle in November the same year. This in turn became the Home Army in February 1942.); Peasants' Battalions (Note: Integrated into the Home Army in 1944.); National Armed Forces (Note: Formed from the merger of the National Military Organization and Military Organization Lizard Union in 1942. Partially integrated into the Home Army in March 1944 (NSZ-AK), while remaining units continued independently (NSZ-ZJ).) and others... Supported by: Polish Government-in-Exile; Western Allies Provisional Government (Note: The Polish Workers' Party established the State National Council to rival the Polish Underground State in December 1943. The Council established the Polish Committee of National Liberation in July 1944 which evolved into the Provisional Government of Poland in December 1944.): People's Guard (1942–1944); People's Army (1944); Supported by: Soviet Union (After 1941; only Communists)

Commanders and leaders
(Nazi Germany) Hans Frank; (Nazi Germany) Walter Model †; (Nazi Germany) Oskar Dirlewanger (executed); (Nazi Germany) E. von dem Bach-Zelewski; (Nazi Germany) Franz Kutschera X; (Nazi Germany) Rainer Stahel; (Nazi Germany) Heinz Reinefarth; (Soviet Union) Lavrenty Beria; (Soviet Union) Konstantin Rokossovsky; (Soviet Union) Ivan Serov; Roman Shukhevych; Dmytro Klyachkivsky †	(Poland) Henryk Dobrzański †; (Polish Underground State) M. Karaszewicz-Tokarzewski; (Polish Underground State) Stefan Rowecki (executed); (Polish Underground State) Tadeusz Komorowski (POW); (Polish Underground State) Leopold Okulicki; (Polish Underground State) Tadeusz Pełczyński (POW); (Polish Underground State) Emil August Fieldorf; (Polish Underground State) Antoni Chruściel (POW); Franciszek Kamiński; (Poland) Ignacy Oziewicz; (Poland) Tadeusz Kurcyusz #; (Poland) Stanisław Kasznica; (Poland) Władysław Gomułka; (Poland) Bolesław Bierut; (Poland) Edward Osóbka-Morawski; (Poland) Bolesław Mołojec; (Poland) Marian Spychalski; (Poland) Michał Rola-Żymierski; (Poland) Franciszek Jóźwiak

Strength
1,080,000 (1944)	Polish Underground State; 650,000 (1944) Polish People's Army; ~200,000

Casualties and losses
Germany: Up to 150,000 killed, 6,000 officials assassinated; 4,326 damaged or destroyed vehicles; 1/8 of Eastern Front rail transport damaged or destroyed; Polish-Ukrainian conflict: At least 8,700 killed	Polish Underground State: ~34,000–100,000 killed; 20,000–50,000 wounded or captured; Polish People's Army: ~5,000–10,000; Polish-Ukrainian conflict At least 8,100 killed 5,000 killed

In Poland, the resistance movement during World War II was led by the Home Army. The Polish resistance is notable among others for disrupting German supply lines to the Eastern Front (damaging or destroying 1/8 of all rail transports), and providing intelligence reports to the British intelligence agencies (providing 43% of all reports from occupied Europe). It was a part of the Polish Underground State.

== Organizations ==
The largest of all Polish resistance organizations was the Armia Krajowa (Home Army, AK), loyal to the Polish government in exile in London. The AK was formed in 1942 from the Union of Armed Struggle (Związek Walki Zbrojnej or ZWZ, itself created in 1939) and would eventually incorporate most other Polish armed resistance groups (except for the communists and some far-right groups). It was the military arm of the Polish Underground State and loyal to the Polish government in Exile.

Most of the other Polish underground armed organizations were created by a political party or faction, and included:

- The Bataliony Chłopskie (Peasants' Battalions). Created by the leftist People's Party around 1940–1941, it would partially merge with AK around 1942–1943.
- The Gwardia Ludowa WRN (People's Guard of WRN) of Polish Socialist Party (PPS) (joined ZWZ around 1940, subsequently merged into AK)
- The Konfederacja Narodu (Confederation of the Nation). Created in 1940 by far-right Obóz Narodowo Radykalny-Falanga (National Radical Camp Falanga). It would partially merge with ZWZ around 1941 and finally join AK around fall 1943.
- The Narodowa Organizacja Wojskowa (National Military Organisation), established by the National Party in 1939, mostly integrated with AK around 1942.
- Narodowe Siły Zbrojne (National Armed Forces); created in 1943 from dissatisfied NOW units, which refused to be subordinated to the AK.
- The Obóz Polski Walczącej (Camp of Fighting Poland), established by the Obóz Zjednoczenia Narodowego (Camp of National Unity) around 1942, subordinated to AK. in 1943.

The largest groups that refused to join the AK were the National Armed Forces and the pro-Soviet and communist People's Army (Polish Armia Ludowa or AL), backed by the Soviet Union and established by the Polish Workers' Party (Polish Polska Partia Robotnicza or PPR).

Regarding the scale and scope of the Polish resistance, Reichsfuhrer-SS Heinrich Himmler noted on 31 December 1942:

Within the framework of the entire enemy intelligence operations directed against Germany, the intelligence service of the Polish resistance movement assumed major significance. The scope and importance of the operations of the Polish resistance movement, which was ramified down to the smallest splinter group and brilliantly organized, have been in (various sources) disclosed in connection with carrying out of major police security operations.

== Size ==
In February 1942, when AK was formed, it numbered about 100,000 members. In the beginning of 1943, it had reached a strength of about 200,000. In the summer of 1944 when Operation Tempest began, AK reached its highest membership numbers, though the estimates vary from 300,000 to 500,000. The strength of the second largest resistance organization, Bataliony Chłopskie (Peasants' Battalions), can be estimated for summer 1944 (at which time they were mostly merged with AK) at about 160,000 men. The third largest group include NSZ (National Armed Forces) with approximately 70,000 men around 1943–1944; only small parts of that force were merged with AK. At its height in 1944, the communist Armia Ludowa, which never merged with AK, numbered about 30,000 people. One estimate for the summer 1944 strength of AK and its allies, including NSZ, gives its strength at 650,000. Overall, the Polish resistance have often been described as the largest or one of the largest resistance organizations in World War II Europe.^{[a]}

== Actions, operations, and intelligence, 1939–1945 ==
=== 1939 ===
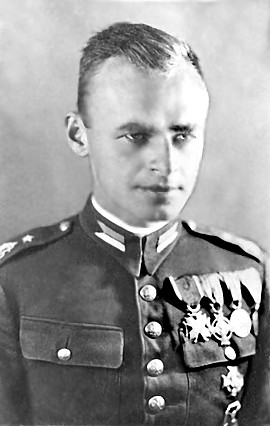
Witold Pilecki – founder of the TAP organisation and the secret agent of Polish resistance in Auschwitz

On 9 November 1939, two soldiers of the Polish army – Witold Pilecki and Major Jan Włodarkiewicz – founded the Secret Polish Army (Tajna Armia Polska, TAP), one of the first underground organizations in Poland after defeat. Pilecki became its organizational commander as TAP expanded to cover not only Warsaw but Siedlce, Radom, Lublin and other major cities of central Poland. By 1940, TAP had approximately 8,000 men (more than half of them armed), some 20 machine guns and several anti-tank rifles. Later, the organization was incorporated into the Union for Armed Struggle (Związek Walki Zbrojnej), later renamed and better known as the Home Army (Armia Krajowa).

=== 1940 ===
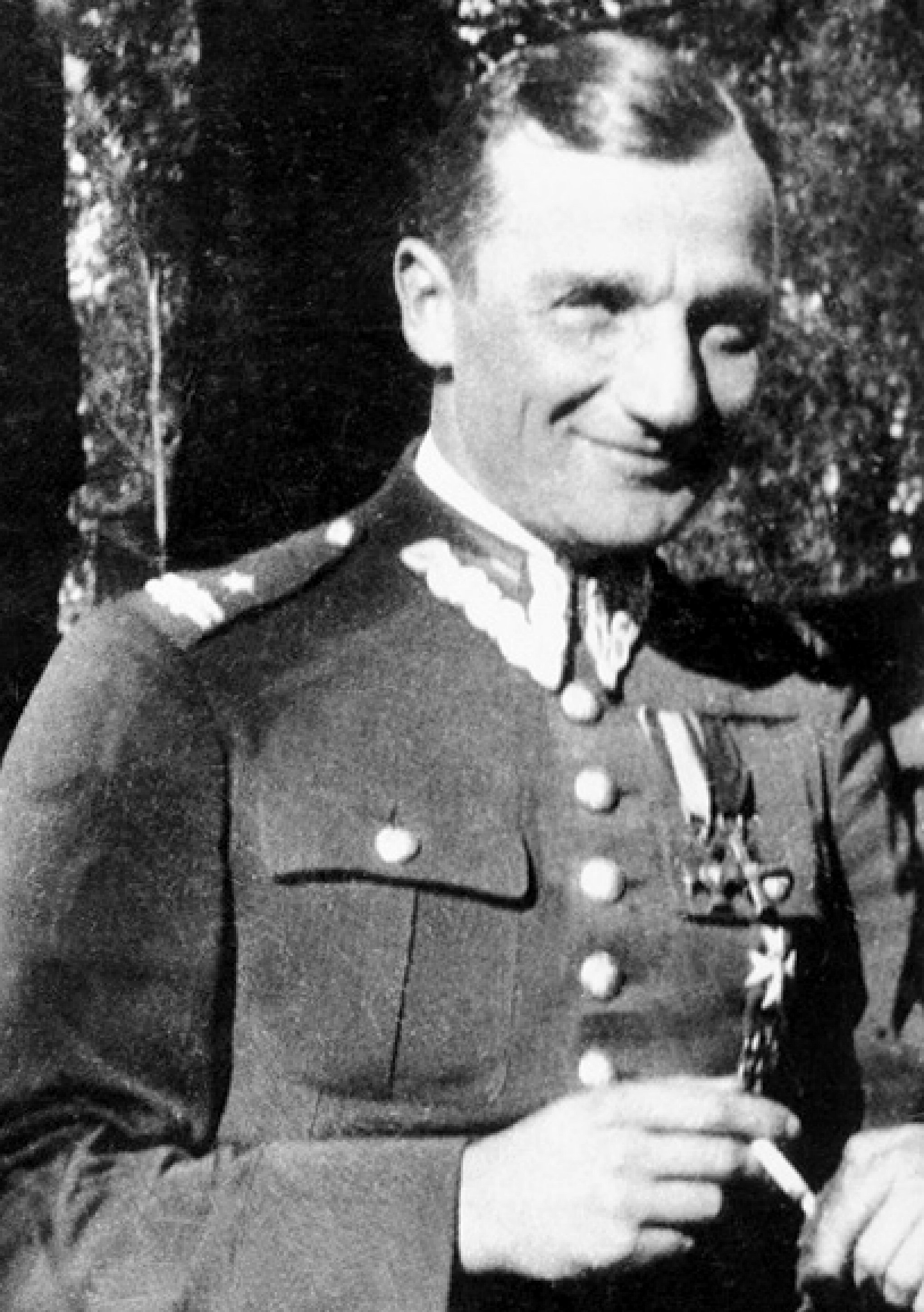
Major Henryk Dobrzański aka "Hubal"

In March 1940, a partisan unit of the first guerrilla commanders in the Second World War in Europe under Major Henryk Dobrzański "Hubal" destroyed a battalion of German infantry in a skirmish near the village of Huciska. A few days later in an ambush near the village of Szałasy it inflicted heavy casualties upon another German unit. To counter this threat the German authorities formed a special 1,000 men strong counter-insurgency unit of combined SS–Wehrmacht forces, including a Panzer group. Although the unit of Major Dobrzański never exceeded 300 men, the Germans fielded at least 8,000 men in the area to secure it.

In 1940, Witold Pilecki, an intelligence officer for the Polish resistance, presented to his superiors a plan to enter Germany's Auschwitz concentration camp, gather intelligence on the camp from the inside, and organize inmate resistance. The Home Army approved this plan, provided him a false identity card, and on 19 September 1940, he deliberately went out during a street roundup (łapanka) in Warsaw and was caught by the Germans along with other civilians and sent to Auschwitz. In the camp he organized the underground organization – Związek Organizacji Wojskowej – ZOW. From October 1940, ZOW sent its first report about the camp and the genocide in November 1940 to Home Army Headquarters in Warsaw through the resistance network organized in Auschwitz.

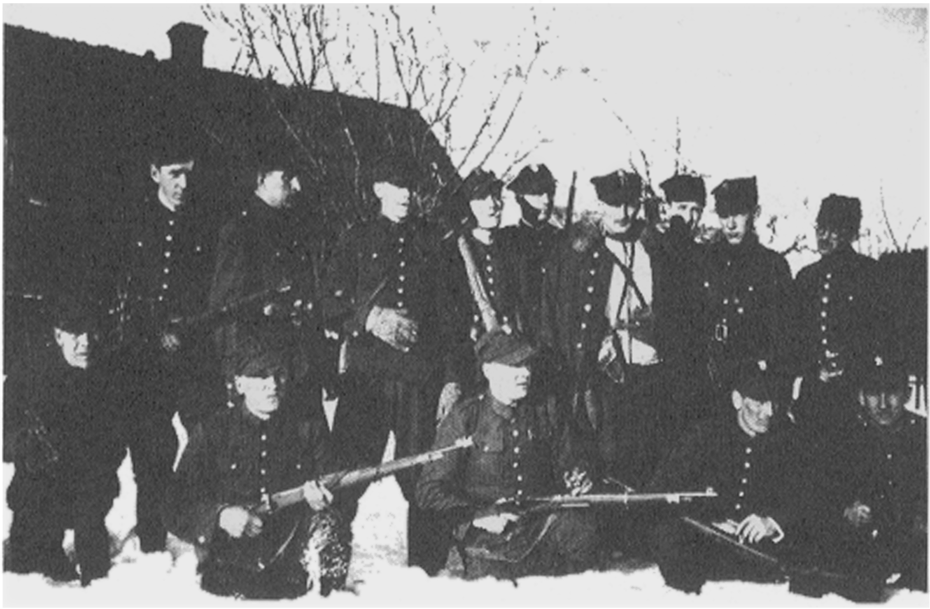
"Hubal" and his partisan unit –winter 1940

During the night of 21–22 January 1940, in the Soviet-occupied Podolian town of Czortków, the Czortków Uprising started; it was the first Polish uprising during World War II. Anti-Soviet Poles, most of them teenagers from local high schools, stormed the local Red Army barracks and a prison, in order to release Polish soldiers kept there.

At the end of 1940 Aleksander Kamiński created a Polish youth resistance organization, known as "Wawer". It was part of the Szare Szeregi (the underground Polish Scouting Association). This organisation carried out many minor sabotage operations in occupied Poland. Its first action was drawing graffiti in Warsaw around Christmas Eve of 1940 commemorating the Wawer massacre. Members of the AK Wawer "Small Sabotage" units painted "Pomścimy Wawer" ("We'll avenge Wawer") on Warsaw walls. At first they painted the whole text, then to save time they shortened it to two letters, P and W. Later they invented Kotwica – "Anchor" – which became the symbol of all Polish resistance in occupied Poland.

=== 1941 ===
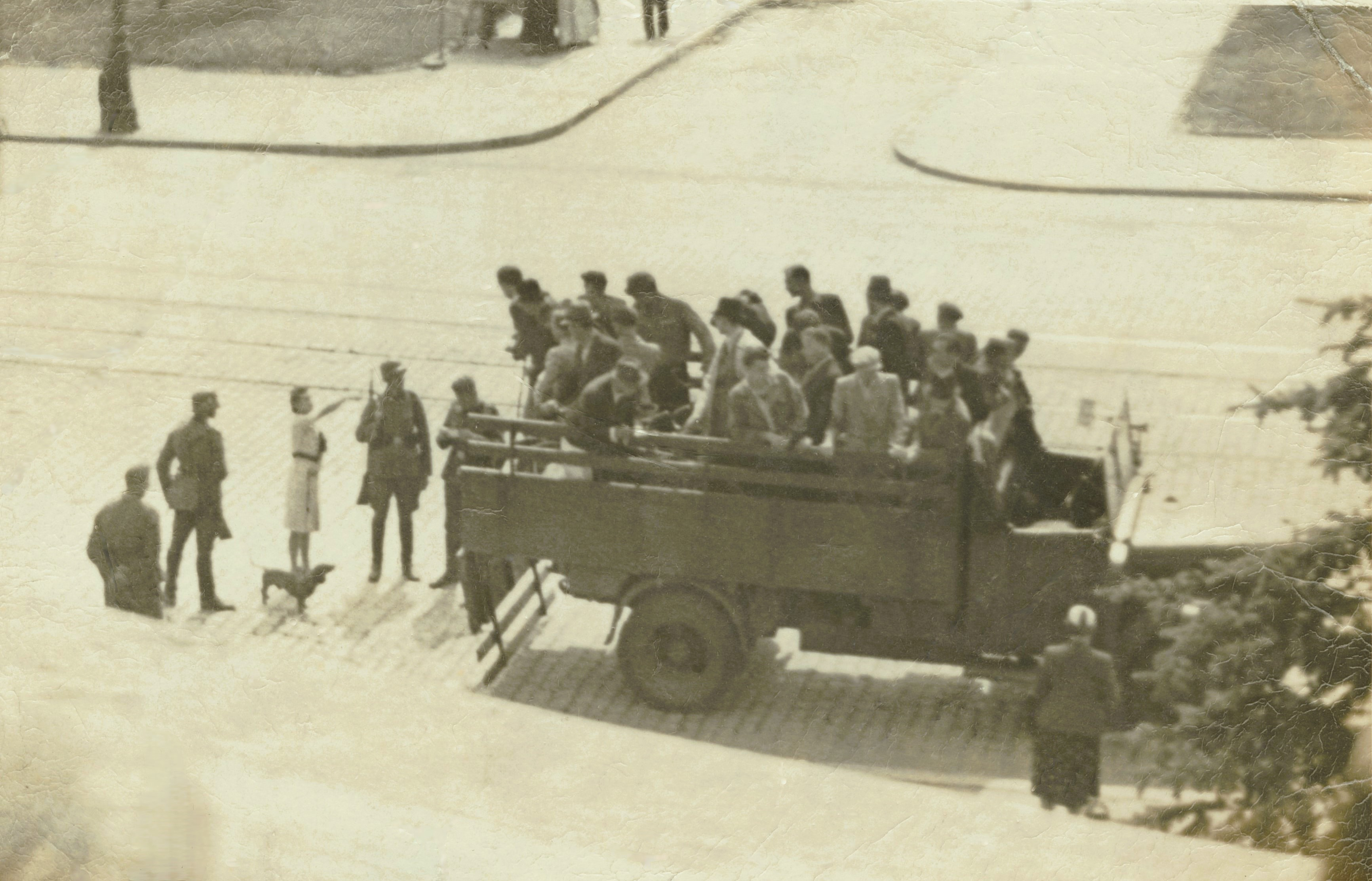
łapanka, possibly the one in which Witold Pilecki was captured in autumn 1941, Warsaw, Żoliborz.

From April 1941 the Bureau of Information and Propaganda of the Union for Armed Struggle started Operation N headed by Tadeusz Żenczykowski. It involved sabotage, subversion and black-propaganda activities.

From March 1941, Witold Pilecki's reports were forwarded to the Polish government in exile and through it, to the British and other Allied governments. These reports informed the Allies about the Holocaust and were the principal source of intelligence on Auschwitz-Birkenau for the Western Allies.

On 7 March 1941, two Polish agents of the Home Army killed Nazi collaborator actor Igo Sym in his apartment in Warsaw. In reprisal, 21 Polish hostages were executed. Several Polish actors were also arrested by the Nazis and sent to Auschwitz, among them such notable figures as directors Stefan Jaracz and Leon Schiller.

In July 1941 Mieczysław Słowikowski (using the codename "Rygor" – Polish for "Rigor") set up "Agency Africa", one of World War II's most successful intelligence organizations. His Polish allies in these endeavors included Lt. Col. Gwido Langer and Major Maksymilian Ciężki. The information gathered by the Agency was used by the Americans and British in planning the amphibious November 1942 Operation Torch landings in North Africa. These were the first large-scale Allied landings of the war, and their success in turn paved the way for the Allies' Italian campaign.

=== 1942 ===
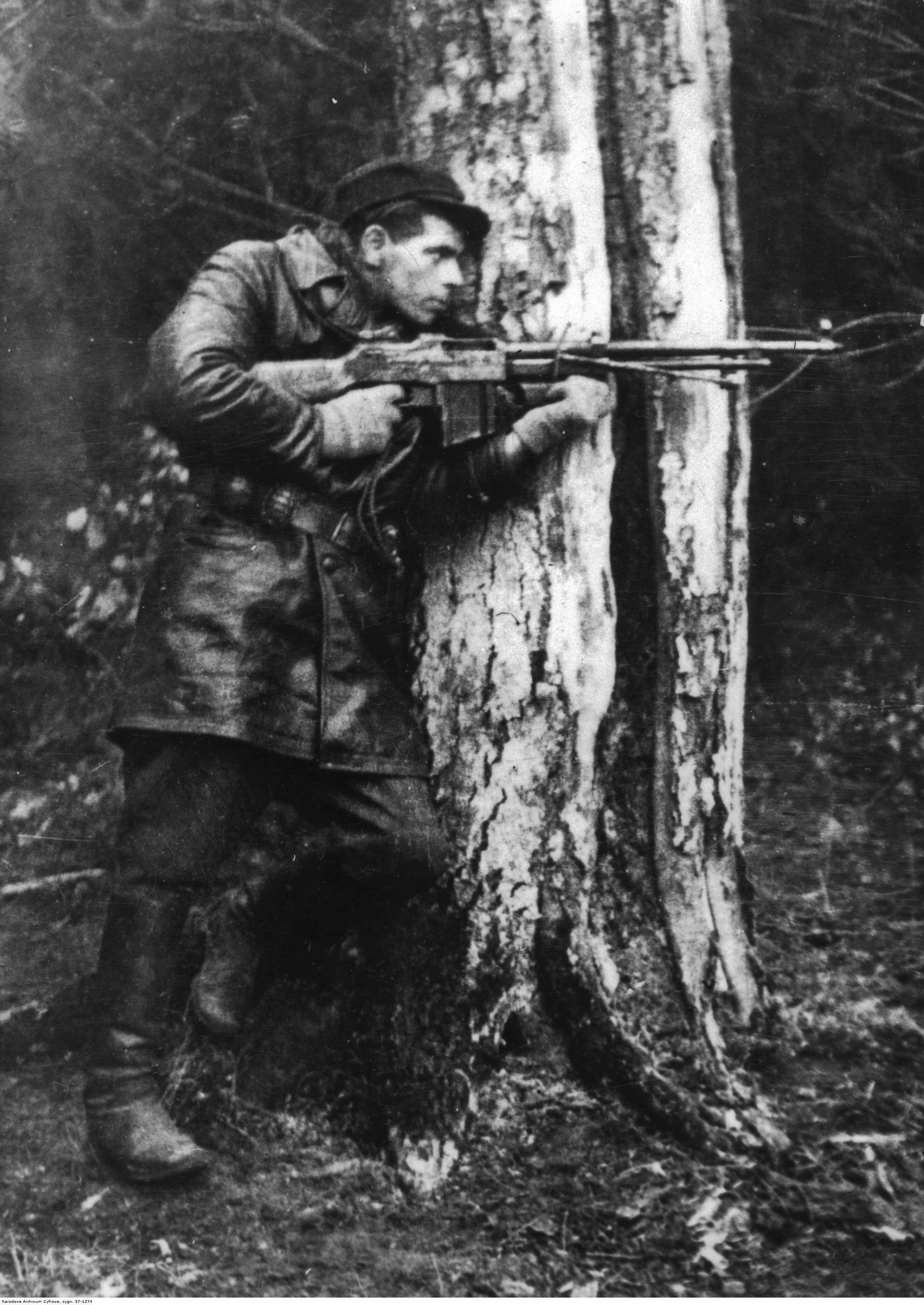
Polish partisan Zdzisław de Ville "Zdzich", member of AK "Jędrusie" with Polish version of the M1918 BAR

On 20 June 1942, the most spectacular escape from Auschwitz concentration camp took place. Four Poles, Eugeniusz Bendera, Kazimierz Piechowski, Stanisław Gustaw Jaster and Józef Lempart made a daring escape. The escapees were dressed as members of the SS-Totenkopfverbände, fully armed and in an SS staff car. They drove out the main gate in a stolen Steyr 220 automobile with a smuggled report from Witold Pilecki about the Holocaust. Three of the escapees remained free until the end of the war; Jaster, who joined the Polish Underground, was recaptured in 1943 and died shortly afterwards in German custody.

In September 1942 "The Żegota Council for the Aid of the Jews" was founded by Zofia Kossak-Szczucka and Wanda Krahelska-Filipowicz ("Alinka") and made up of Polish Democrats as well as other Catholic activists. Poland was the only country in occupied Europe where there existed such a dedicated secret organization. Half of the Jews in Poland who survived the war (thus over 50,000) were aided in some way by Żegota. The best-known activist of Żegota was Irena Sendler, head of the children's division, who saved 2,500 Jewish children by smuggling them out of the Warsaw Ghetto, providing them with false documents, and sheltering them in individual and group children's homes outside the ghetto.

In 1942 Jan Karski reported to the Polish, British and U.S. governments on the situation in Poland, especially the Holocaust of the Jews. He met with Polish politicians in exile including the prime minister, and members of political parties such as the Socialist Party, National Party, Labor Party, People's Party, Jewish Bund and Poalei Zion. He also spoke to Anthony Eden, the British foreign secretary, and included a detailed statement on what he had seen in Warsaw and Bełżec.

The Zamość Uprising was an armed uprising of Armia Krajowa and Bataliony Chłopskie against the forced expulsion of Poles from the Zamość region under the Nazi Generalplan Ost. The Germans attempted to remove the local Poles from the Greater Zamość area (through forced removal, transfer to forced labor camps, or, in some cases, mass murder) to get it ready for German colonization. It lasted from 1942 until 1944 and despite heavy casualties suffered by the Underground, the Germans failed.

On the night from 7 to 8 October 1942 Operation Wieniec started. It targeted rail infrastructure near Warsaw. Similar operations aimed at disrupting and harrying German transport and communication in occupied Poland occurred in the coming months and years. It targeted railroads, bridges and supply depots, primarily near transport hubs such as Warsaw and Lublin.

=== 1943 ===
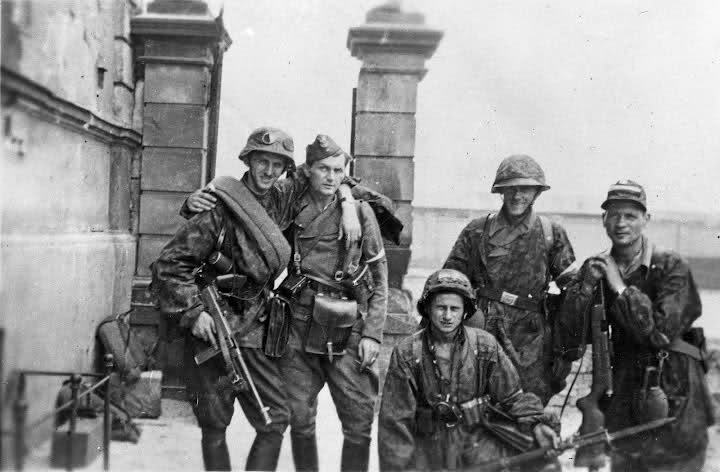
Soldiers from Kolegium "A" of Kedyw on Stawki Street in Wola district – Warsaw Uprising 1944

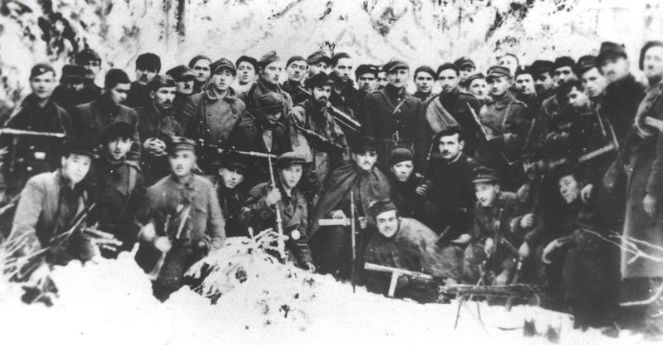
Polish partisans from Kielce area – unit "Jędrusie" 1945

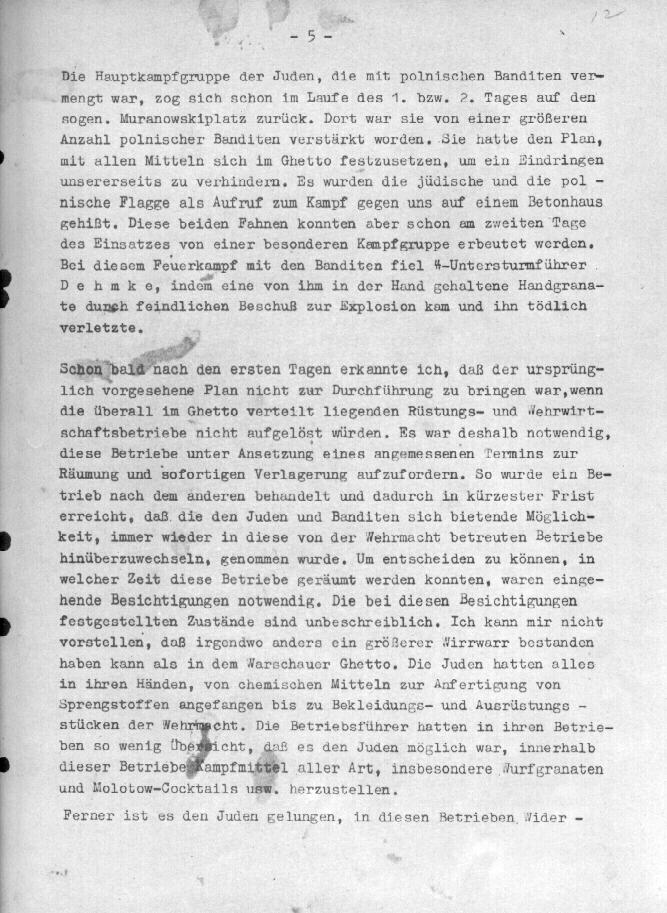
Page 5 of Stroop Report describing German fight against "Juden mit polnischen Banditen" – "Jews with Polish bandits".

In early 1943 two Polish janitors of Peenemünde's Camp Trassenheide provided maps, sketches and reports to Armia Krajowa Intelligence, and in June 1943 British intelligence had received two such reports which identified the "rocket assembly hall', 'experimental pit', and 'launching tower'. When reconnaissance and intelligence information regarding the V-2 rocket became convincing, the War Cabinet Defence Committee (Operations) directed the campaign's first planned raid (the Operation Hydra bombing of Peenemünde in August 1943) and Operation Crossbow.

On 26 March 1943 in Warsaw Operation Arsenal was launched by the Szare Szeregi (Gray Ranks) Polish Underground The successful operation led to the release of arrested troop leader Jan Bytnar "Rudy". In an attack on the prison, Bytnar and 24 other prisoners were freed.

In 1943 in London Jan Karski met the then much known journalist Arthur Koestler. He then traveled to the United States and reported to President Franklin D. Roosevelt. His report was a major factor in informing the West. In July 1943, again personally reported to Roosevelt about the situation in Poland. He also met with many other government and civic leaders in the United States, including Felix Frankfurter, Cordell Hull, William Joseph Donovan, and Stephen Wise. Karski also presented his report to media, bishops of various denominations (including Cardinal Samuel Stritch), members of the Hollywood film industry and artists, but without success. Many of those he spoke to did not believe him, or supposed that his testimony was much exaggerated or was propaganda from the Polish government in exile.

In April 1943 the Germans began deporting the remaining Jews from the Warsaw Ghetto provoking the Warsaw Ghetto Uprising, 19 April to 16 May. Polish Underground State ordered Ghetto Action – a series of combat actions carried out by the Home Army during the uprising between 19 April 1943 and May 16, 1943.

Some units of the AK tried to assist the ghetto rising, but for the most part, the resistance was unprepared and unable to defeat the Germans. One Polish AK unit, the National Security Corps (Państwowy Korpus Bezpieczeństwa), under the command of Henryk Iwański ("Bystry"), fought inside the ghetto along with ŻZW. Subsequently, both groups retreated together (including 34 Jewish fighters). Although Iwański's action is the most well-known rescue mission, it was only one of many actions undertaken by the Polish resistance to help the Jewish fighters. In one attack, three cell units of AK under the command of Kapitan Józef Pszenny ("Chwacki") tried to breach the ghetto walls with explosives, but the Germans defeated this action. AK and GL engaged the Germans between 19 and 23 April at six different locations outside the ghetto walls, shooting at German sentries and positions and in one case attempting to blow up a gate. Participation of the Polish underground in the uprising was many times confirmed by a report of the German commander – Jürgen Stroop.

When we invaded the Ghetto for the first time, the Jews and the Polish bandits succeeded in repelling the participating units, including tanks and armored cars, by a well-prepared concentration of fire. (...) The main Jewish battle group, mixed with Polish bandits, had already retired during the first and second day to the so-called Muranowski Square. There, it was reinforced by a considerable number of Polish bandits. Its plan was to hold the Ghetto by every means in order to prevent us from invading it. (...) Time and again Polish bandits found refuge in the Ghetto and remained there undisturbed, since we had no forces at our disposal to comb out this maze. (...) One such battle group succeeded in mounting a truck by ascending from a sewer in the so-called Prosta [Street], and in escaping with it (about 30 to 35 bandits). (...) The bandits and Jews – there were Polish bandits among these gangs armed with carbines, small arms, and in one case a light machine gun – mounted the truck and drove away in an unknown direction.

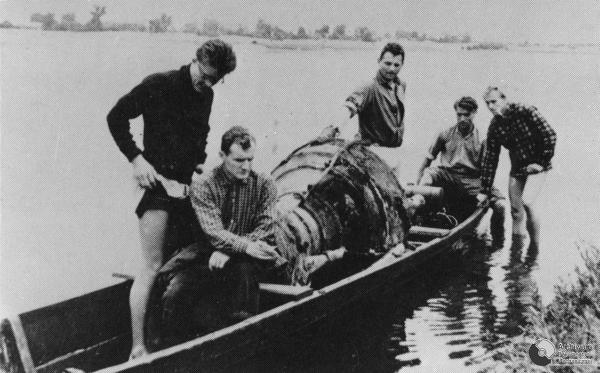
AK members recovering V-2 from the Bug River.

In August 1943 the headquarters of the Armia Krajowa ordered Operation Belt which was one of the large-scale anti-Nazi operations of the AK during the war. By February 1944, 13 German outposts were destroyed with few losses on the Polish side.

Operation Heads began: the serial executions of German personnel who had been sentenced to death by Polish underground Special Courts for crimes against Polish citizens in German-occupied Poland.

On 7 September 1943, the Home Army killed Franz Bürkl during Operation Bürkl. Bürkl was a high-ranking Gestapo agent responsible for the murder and brutal interrogation of thousands of Polish Jews and resistance fighters and supporters. In reprisal, 20 inmates of Pawiak were murdered in a public execution by the Nazis.

In November 1943, Operation Most III started. The Armia Krajowa provided the Allies with crucial intelligence on the German V-2 rocket. In effect some 50 kg of the most important parts of the captured V-2, as well as the final report, analyses, sketches and photos, were transported to Brindisi by a Royal Air Force Douglas Dakota aircraft. In late July 1944, the V-2 parts were delivered to London.

In early 1943 the strength of the forest-based groups can be estimated at 40 groups numbering in total 1,200 to 4,000 fighters, but the numbers grew significantly next year.

=== 1944 ===
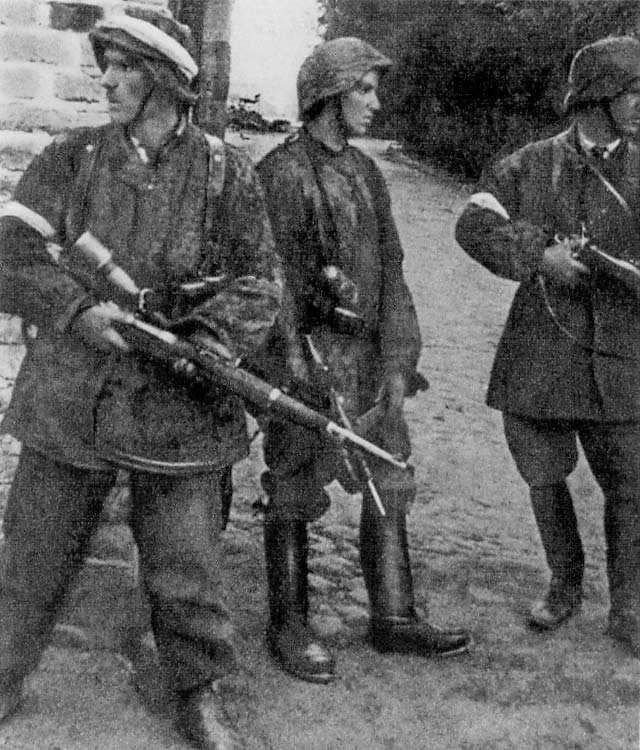
Polish resistance soldiers from Batalion Zośka during 1944 Warsaw Uprising

On 11 February 1944 the Resistance fighters of Polish Home Army's unit Agat executed Franz Kutschera, SS and Reich's Police Chief in Warsaw in action known as Operation Kutschera. In a reprisal of this action 27 February 140 inmates of Pawiak – Poles and Jews – were shot in a public execution by the Germans.

13–14 May 1944 the Battle of Murowana Oszmianka the largest clash between the Polish anti-Nazi Armia Krajowa and the Nazi Lithuanian Territorial Defense Force a Lithuanian volunteer security force subordinated to Nazi Germany. The battle took place in and near the village of Murowana Oszmianka in the Generalbezirk Litauen of Reichskommissariat Ostland. The outcome of the battle was that the 301st LVR battalion was routed and the entire force was disbanded by the Germans soon afterwards.

On 14 June 1944 the Battle of Porytowe Wzgórze took place between Polish and Russian partisans, numbering around 3,000, and the Nazi German units consisted of between 25,000 and 30,000 soldiers, with artillery, tanks and armored cars and air support.

On 25–26 June 1944 the Battle of Osuchy – one of the largest battles between the Polish resistance and Nazi Germany in occupied Poland during World War II – was fought, in what was essentially a continuation of the Zamość Uprising.

In 1943 the Home Army built up its forces in preparation for a national uprising. The plan of national anti-Nazi uprising on areas of prewar Poland was code-named Operation Tempest. Preparation began in late 1943 but the military actions started in 1944. Its most widely known elements were Operation Ostra Brama, Lwów Uprising and the Warsaw Uprising.

On 7 July, Operation Ostra Brama started. Approximately 12,500 Home Army soldiers attacked the German garrison and managed to seize most of the city center. Heavy street fighting in the outskirts of the city lasted until 14 July. In Vilnius' eastern suburbs, the Home Army units cooperated with reconnaissance groups of the Soviet 3rd Belorussian Front. The Red Army entered the city on 15 July, and the NKVD started to intern all Polish soldiers. On 16 July, the HQ of the 3rd Belorussian Front invited Polish officers to a meeting and arrested them.

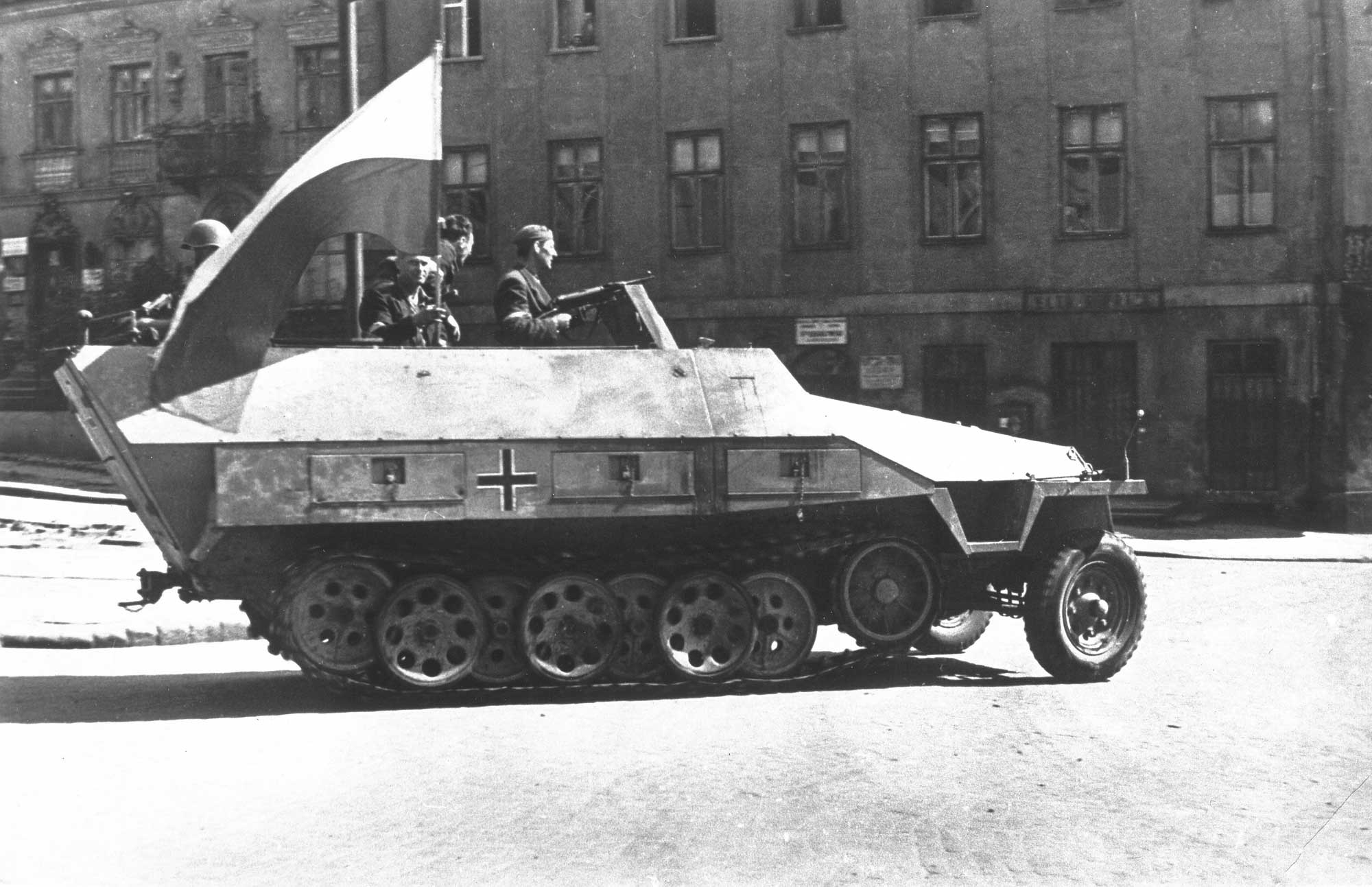
"Gray Wolf" with Polish flag: German Sd.Kfz. 251 armored vehicle captured by the 8th Krybar Regiment of the Warsaw resistance on 14 August 1944 from the 5th Wiking SS Panzer Division

On 23 July the Lwów Uprising – the armed struggle started by the Armia Krajowa against the Nazi occupiers in Lwów during World War II – started. It started in July 1944 as a part of a plan of all-national uprising codenamed Operation Tempest. The fighting lasted until 27 July and resulted in liberation of the city. However, shortly afterwards the Polish soldiers were arrested by the invading Soviets and either forced to join the Red Army or sent to the Gulags. The city itself was occupied by the Soviet Union.

July 25-26, 1944, Operation Most III took place as recalled in Polish documents cited below translated to English. This was a World War II operation in which the Armia Krajowa in Poland provided information regarding the German V-2 Rockets to the Allies. Apart from the Armia Krajowa, several inhabitants of the town of Przybysławice also took part in the operation. Almost the entire town, specifically the youth of the town of Przybysławice, joined the Polish resistance or underground fight against the German enemy. A larger part of intelligence from the cities hid in this town during the war due to being pursued by the Gestapo. The most distinguished members of the resistance from this part of Poland during wartime included Paweł Lata, Tomasz Biś, Jan Szpara, Kazimierz Król, Jan Lechowicz, Mieczysław and Józef Wasiowie, Władysław Myśliński, Wawrzyniec Kusior, Jan and Roman Kuma, and Stanisław Gucwa. One of these members, Jan Szpara, was a headmaster of the school in Przybysławice who taught the youth the spirit of patriotism. He also prepared students for participation in choral and stage groups, which were highly valued in the area after the war. The photo of Jan on his wagon attached is owned and was added by a family member. He had been responsible for the transport of the rocket from the storage area in barns to eventually transport it to England during Operation III Most.

In August 1944, as the Soviet armed forces approached Warsaw, the government in exile called for an uprising in the city, so that they could return to a liberated Warsaw and try to prevent a communist take-over. The AK, led by Tadeusz Bór-Komorowski, launched the Warsaw Uprising. Soviet forces were less than 20 km away but on the orders of Soviet High Command they gave no assistance. Stalin described the uprising as a "criminal adventure". The Poles appealed to the Western Allies for help. The Royal Air Force, and the Polish Air Force based in Italy, dropped some munitions, but it was almost impossible for the Allies to help the Poles without Soviet assistance.

The fighting in Warsaw was desperate. The AK had between 12,000 and 20,000 armed soldiers, most with only small arms, against a well-armed German Army of 20,000 SS and regular Army units. Bór-Komorowski's hope that the AK could take and hold Warsaw for the return of the London government was never likely to be achieved. After 63 days of savage fighting the city was reduced to rubble, and the reprisals were savage. The SS and auxiliary units were particularly brutal.

After Bór-Komorowski's surrender, the AK fighters were treated as prisoners-of-war by the Germans, much to the outrage of Stalin, but the civilian population were ruthlessly punished. Overall Polish casualties are estimated to be between 150,000 and 300,000 killed, 90,000 civilians were sent to labor camps in the Reich, while 60,000 were shipped to death and concentration camps such as Ravensbrück, Auschwitz, Mauthausen and others. The city was almost totally destroyed after German sappers systematically demolished the city. The Warsaw Uprising allowed the Germans to destroy the AK as a fighting force, but the main beneficiary was Stalin, who was able to impose a communist government on postwar Poland with little fear of armed resistance.

=== 1945 ===
In March 1945, a staged trial of 16 leaders of the Polish Underground State held by the Soviet Union took place in Moscow – (Trial of the Sixteen). The Government Delegate, together with most members of the Council of National Unity and the C-i-C of the Armia Krajowa, were invited by Soviet general Ivan Serov with agreement of Joseph Stalin to a conference on their eventual entry to the Soviet-backed Provisional Government. They were presented with a warrant of safety, yet they were arrested in Pruszków by the NKVD on 27 and 28 March. Leopold Okulicki, Jan Stanisław Jankowski and Kazimierz Pużak were arrested on 27th with 12 more the next day. A. Zwierzynski had been arrested earlier. They were brought to Moscow for interrogation in the Lubyanka. After several months of brutal interrogation and torture, they were presented with the forged accusations of "collaboration with Nazi Germany" and "planning a military alliance with Nazi Germany".

In the latter years of the war, there were increasing conflicts between Polish and Soviet partisans. Cursed soldiers continued to oppose the Soviets long after the war. The last cursed soldier – member of the militant anti-communist resistance in Poland was Józef Franczak who was killed with pistol in his hand by ZOMO in 1963.

On 5 May 1945 in Bohemia, the Narodowe Siły Zbrojne brigade liberated prisoners from a Nazi concentration camp in Holiszowo, including 280 Jewish women prisoners. The brigade suffered heavy casualties.

On 7 May 1945 in the village of Kuryłówka, southeastern Poland, the Battle of Kuryłówka started. It was the biggest battle in the history of the Cursed soldiers organization – National Military Alliance (NZW). In battle against Soviet Union's NKVD units anti-communist partisans shot 70 NKVD agents. The battle ended in a victory for the underground Polish forces.

On 21 May 1945, a unit of the Armia Krajowa, led by Colonel Edward Wasilewski, attacked a NKVD camp in Rembertów on the eastern outskirts of Warsaw. The Soviets kept there hundreds of Poles, members of the Home Army, whom they were systematically deporting to Siberia. However, this action of the pro-independence Polish resistance freed all Polish political prisoners from the camp. Between 1944 and 1946, cursed soldiers attacked many communist prisons in Soviet-occupied Poland – see Raids on communist prisons in Poland (1944–1946).

From 10 to 25 June 1945, Augustów chase 1945 (the Polish Obława augustowska) took place. It was a large-scale operation undertaken by Soviet forces of the Red Army, the NKVD and SMERSH, with the assistance of Polish UB and LWP units against former Armia Krajowa soldiers in the Suwałki and Augustów region in Poland. The operation also covered territory in occupied Lithuania. More than 2,000 alleged Polish anticommunist fighters were captured and detained in Russian internment camps. 600 of the "Augustów Missing" are presumed dead and buried in an unknown location in the present territory of Russia. The Augustów Roundup was part of an anti-guerilla operation in Lithuania.

List of confirmed sabotage-diversionary actions of the Union of Armed Struggle (ZWZ) and Home Army (AK) from 1 January 1941 to 30 June 1944
Sabotage / Diversionary Action Type	Cumulative number
Damaged locomotives	6,930
Delayed repairs to locomotives	803
Derailed transports	732
Transports set on fire	443
Damage to railway wagons	19,058
Blown up railway bridges	38
Disruptions to electricity supplies in the Warsaw grid	638
Army vehicles damaged or destroyed	4,326
Damaged aeroplanes	28
Fuel tanks destroyed	1,167
Fuel destroyed (in tonnes)	4,674
Blocked oil wells	5
Wagons of wood wool destroyed	150
Military stores burned down	130
Disruptions of production in factories	7
Built-in faults in parts for aircraft engines	4,710
Built-in faults into cannon muzzles	203
Built-in faults into artillery missiles	92,000
Built-in faults into air traffic radio stations	107
Built-in faults into condensers	70,000
Built-in faults into (electro-industrial) lathes	1,700
Damage to important factory machinery	2,872
Various acts of sabotage performed	25,145
Pre-planned assassinations of Germans	5,733

== Formations ==
- Antyfaszystowska Organizacja Bojowa
- Armia Krajowa
- Armia Ludowa
- Bataliony Chłopskie
- Brygada Swiętokrzyska
- Gwardia Ludowa
- Gwardia Ludowa WRN
- Narodowa Organizacja Wojskowa
- Narodowe Siły Zbrojne
- Obóz Polski Walczącej
- Państwowy Korpus Bezpieczeństwa
- Polish People's Army PAL
- Szare Szeregi
- Tajna Organizacja Wojskowa Gryf Pomorski
- Związek Odwetu
- Związek Walki Zbrojnej
- Żydowska Organizacja Bojowa
- Związek Organizacji Wojskowej
- Żydowski Związek Wojskowy
- Związek Syndykalistów Polskich

== See also ==
- Anti-fascism
- Bratnia Pomoc
- Execution of Tczew hostages
- History of Poland (1939–1945)
- V-1 and V-2 intelligence
- Resistance in Lithuania during World War II
- Polish areas annexed by Nazi Germany
- Territories of Poland annexed by the Soviet Union
- Polish resistance in France during World War II
- Resistance movement
- Western betrayal
- Yugoslav Partisans

== Notes ==
a A number of sources note that the Home Army, representing the bulk of Polish resistance, was the largest resistance movement in Nazi-occupied Europe. Norman Davies writes that the "Armia Krajowa (Home Army), the AK,... could fairly claim to be the largest of European resistance [organizations]." Gregor Dallas writes that the "Home Army (Armia Krajowa or AK) in late 1943 numbered around 400,000, making it the largest resistance organization in Europe." Mark Wyman writes that the "Armia Krajowa was considered the largest underground resistance unit in wartime Europe." The numbers of Soviet partisans were very similar to those of the Polish resistance.

== Bibliography ==
- Strzembosz, Tomasz (1978). Akcje zbrojne podziemnej Warszawy 1939–1944 [Armed actions of underground Warsaw 1939–1944] (in Polish). Warsaw: Państwowy Instytut Wydawniczy. ISBN 978-8306007176.
- Stroop, Juergen (1979). The Stroop Report: "The Jewish Quarter of Warsaw is No More!". Translated by Milton, Sybil. New York: Pantheon. ISBN 9780394504438.
- Karski, Jan (2013). Story of a secret state. My Report to the World. Washington DC: Georgetown University Press. ISBN 9781589019836.
- “Operation Most III.” War History, 13 Dec. 2024, warhistory.org/@msw/article/operation-most-iii.
- "Przybysławice w Latach I i II Wojny Światowej" [Przybysławice during World War I and II] (in Polish). Niepubliczna Szkoła Podstawowa w Przybysławicach.
- (in Polish)Woźny, Franciszek, et al. Pamiętnik Złotego Jubileuszu Klubu Przybysławice. Biblioteka Marcinkowice, 1977.
- Kostrzewa, Maria; Maria Kostrewa Dowiad (26 July 2017). "Transport części niemieckiej rakiety V-2 do Przybysławic" [Transport of parts of the German V-2 rocket to Przybysławice] (in Polish).
- Kołodziej, Wincenty. "Mieczystaw Adamczyk - partyzant z Otfinowa" [Mieczysław Adamczyk - partisan from Otfinów] (PDF) (in Polish).
- Skruda, Kurier (8 August 2011). "Dramatyczne I Strategiczne Dla Losów II Wojny Zakończenie Akcji "Salamander" – Akcja "Most III"" [The dramatic and strategic ending of Operation Salamander for the fate of World War II – Operation MOST III] (in Polish).
