= Witold Pilecki =

Polish military officer (1901–1948)

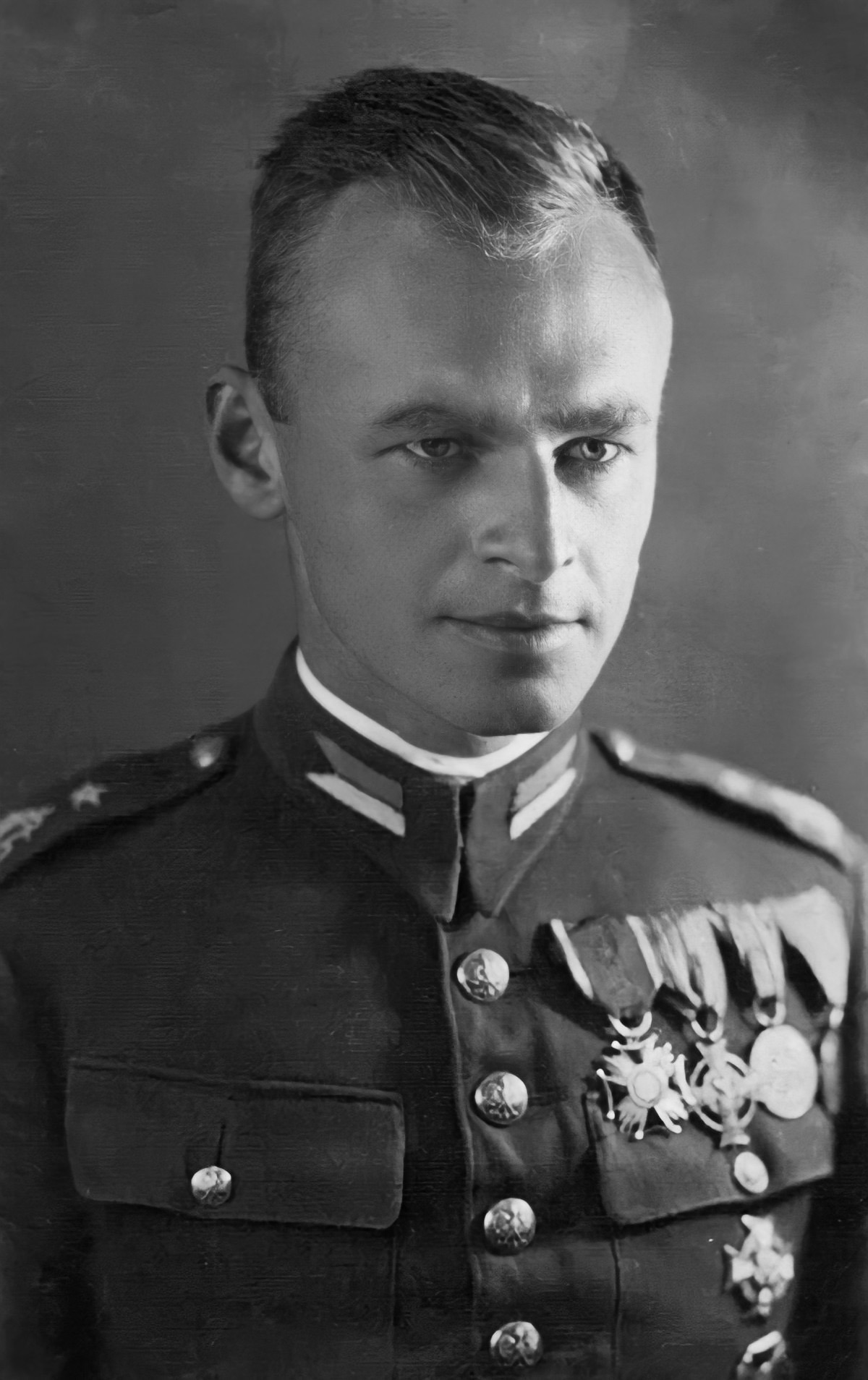
- Pilecki before 1939
- Born: 13 May 1901; Olonets, Olonetsky Uyezd, Olonets Governorate, Russian Empire
- Died: 25 May 1948 (aged 47); Mokotów Prison, Warsaw, Republic of Poland
- Cause of death: Execution by shooting
- Burial place: Unknown; possibly in Powązki Military Cemetery
- Education: University of Poznań, Faculty of Agriculture (1922); Stefan Batory University, Faculty of Fine Arts (1922–1924)
- Spouse: Maria Ostrowska (m. 1931)
- Children: 2
- Military career
- Allegiance: Second Polish Republic; Polish government-in-exile
- Service years: 1918–1947
- Rank: Cavalry captain (rotmistrz)
- Commands: Commander of the 1st Lida Military Training Squadron (1932–1937); Deputy Commander of the 41st Infantry Division (1939); Organizer of the Secret Polish Army (1939–1940); Organizer of the Union of Military Organizations (1940–1943); Commander of the Warszawianka Company (1944)
- Conflicts: Polish–Soviet War; Vilna offensive (1919); Kiev offensive (1920); First Battle of Grodno (1920); Battle of Warsaw (1920); Polish–Lithuanian War; Żeligowski's Mutiny (1920); World War II; September Campaign (1939); Warsaw Uprising (1944)
- Awards: Order of the White Eagle; Order of Polonia Restituta; Cross of Valour (2); Silver Cross of Merit

Witold Pilecki (Polish: [ˈvitɔlt piˈlɛt͡skʲi]; 13 May 1901 – 25 May 1948), known by the codenames Roman Jezierski, Tomasz Serafiński, Druh and Witold, was a Polish World War II cavalry officer, intelligence agent, and resistance leader.

As a youth, Pilecki joined Polish underground scouting; in the aftermath of World War I, he joined the Polish militia and, later, the Polish Army. He participated in the Polish–Soviet War, which ended in 1921. In 1939, he participated in the unsuccessful defence of Poland against the invasion by Nazi Germany, the Slovak Republic, and the Soviet Union. Shortly afterward, he joined the Polish resistance, co-founding the Secret Polish Army resistance movement. In 1940, Pilecki let himself be captured by the occupying Germans in order to be voluntarily sent to the Auschwitz concentration camp and infiltrate it. At Auschwitz, he organized a resistance movement that eventually included hundreds of inmates, and he secretly drew up reports detailing German atrocities at the camp, which were smuggled out to Home Army headquarters and shared with the Western Allies. After escaping from Auschwitz in April 1943, Pilecki fought in the Warsaw Uprising of August–October 1944. Following its suppression, he was interned in a German prisoner-of-war camp.

After the communist takeover of Poland, Pilecki remained loyal to the London-based Polish government-in-exile. He returned to Poland in 1945 to report back on the situation there to the government-in-exile. Before travelling home, and anticipating that he might be killed by Poland's new communist authorities, Pilecki completed the compilation known as Witold's Report which recorded his Auschwitz experiences in detail. Pilecki's fears were well founded: in 1947, he was arrested by the secret police on charges of working for "foreign imperialism" and the following year, after being subjected to torture and a show trial, he was executed in Warsaw aged 47.

Pilecki's story, inconvenient to the Polish communist authorities, remained mostly unknown for several decades. One of the first accounts of Pilecki's mission to Auschwitz was given by Polish historian Józef Garliński—himself a former Auschwitz inmate who emigrated to Britain after the war—in Fighting Auschwitz: The Resistance Movement in the Concentration Camp (1975). Several monographs appeared in subsequent years, particularly after the fall of communism in Poland allowed for research into his life by Polish historians.

== Early life and education ==
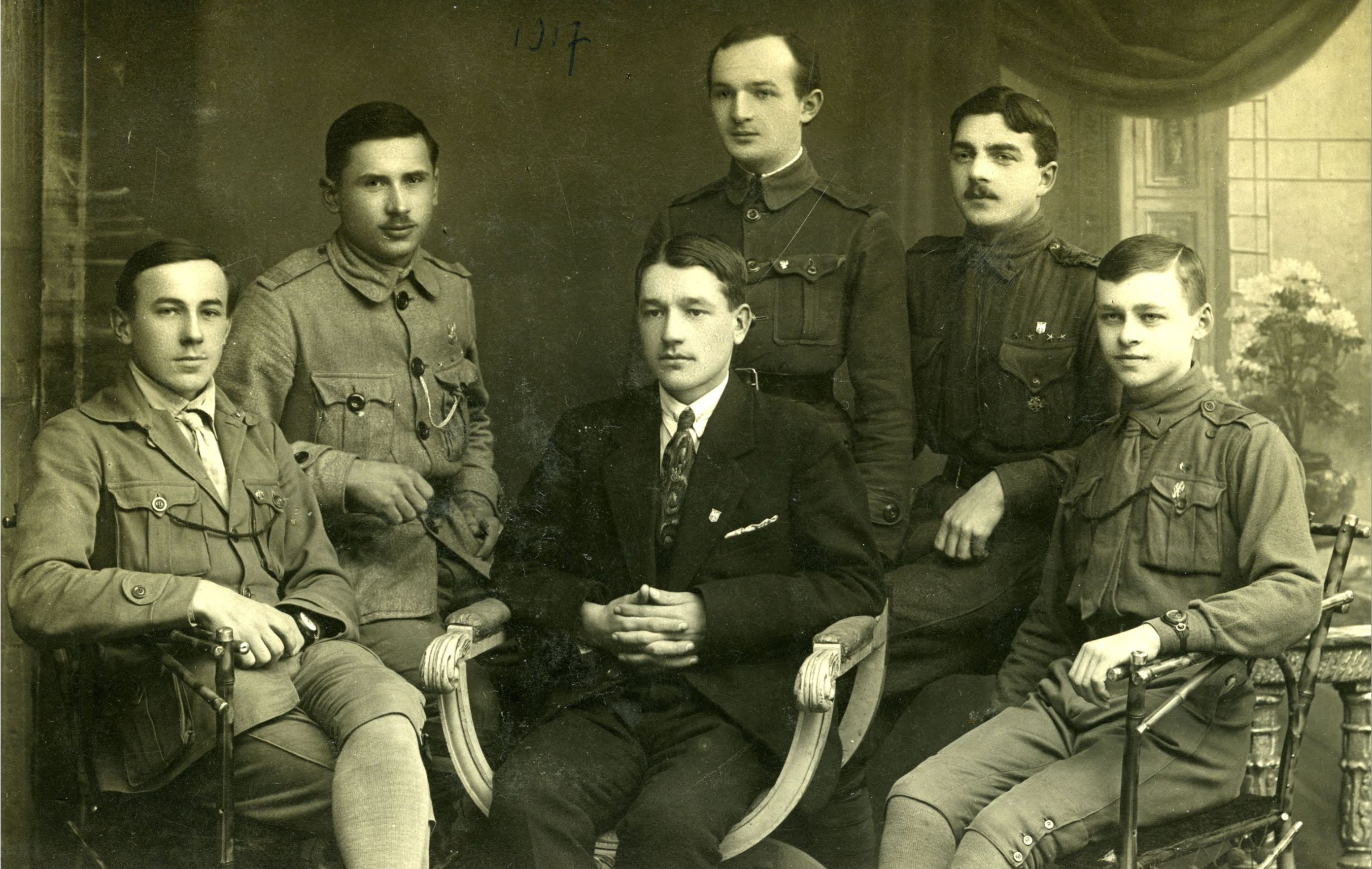
Pilecki (first right) as a scout, Oryol, Russia, 1917

Witold Pilecki was born on 13 May 1901 in the town of Olonets, Karelia, in the Russian Empire. He was a descendant of a Polish-speaking noble family (szlachta) of the Leliwa coat of arms. His ancestors had been deported to Russia from their home in Lithuania (former Nowogródek Voivodeship region, now in Belarus) for participating in the January 1863–64 Uprising, for which a major part of their estate was confiscated. Witold was one of five children of forest inspector Julian Pilecki and Ludwika Osiecimska.

In 1910, Witold moved with his mother and siblings to Vilnius, to attend a Polish school there, while his father remained in Olonets. In Vilnius, Pilecki attended a local school and joined the underground Polish Scouting and Guiding Association (Związek Harcerstwa Polskiego, ZHP).

Following the outbreak of World War I, in 1916 Pilecki was sent by his mother to a school in the Russian city of Oryol, located safer in the East than Vilnius. There he attended a gymnasium (secondary school) and founded a local chapter of the ZHP.

== Early military career ==
=== Polish–Soviet War ===
In 1918, following the outbreak of the Russian Revolution and the defeat of the Central Powers in World War I, Pilecki returned to Vilnius, then outside the control of the Polish government, and joined the ZHP section of the Self-Defence of Lithuania and Belarus, a paramilitary formation under Major General Władysław Wejtko. The militia disarmed the passing German troops and took up positions to defend the city from a looming attack by the Soviet Red Army. After Vilnius fell to Bolshevik forces on 5 January 1919, Pilecki and his unit resorted to partisan warfare behind Soviet lines. He and his comrades then retreated to Białystok, where Pilecki enlisted as a szeregowy (private) in Poland's newly established Army. He fought in the Polish–Soviet War of 1919–1920, serving under Captain Jerzy Dąbrowski and being involved in the Vilna offensive. He fought in the Kiev offensive (1920) and as part of a cavalry unit defending the then-Polish city of Grodno. On 5 August 1920, Pilecki joined the 211th Uhlan Regiment and fought in the crucial Battle of Warsaw and then in the Rūdninkai Forest. Pilecki later was involved in the Polish–Lithuanian War as a member of the October 1920 Żeligowski's Mutiny where Polish troops occupied Vilnius in a false-flag operation.

=== Interwar years ===
By the conclusion of the Polish-Soviet War in March 1921, Pilecki was promoted to the rank of plutonowy (corporal), becoming a non-commissioned officer. Shortly afterward, Pilecki was transferred to the army reserves, completing courses required for a non-commissioned officer rank at the Cavalry Reserve Officers' Training School in Grudziądz. He went on to complete his secondary education (matura) later that same year. He briefly enrolled with the Faculty of Fine Arts at Stefan Batory University but was forced to abandon his studies in 1924 due to both financial issues and the declining health of his father. In July 1925, Pilecki was assigned to the 26th Lancer Regiment with the rank of Chorąży (ensign). Pilecki would be promoted to podporucznik (second lieutenant, with seniority from 1923) the following year. Also in September 1926, Pilecki became the owner of his family's ancestral estate, Sukurcze, in the Lida District of the Nowogródek Voivodeship. In 1931, he married Maria Ostrowska (1906–2002). They had two children, born in Vilnius over the next two years: Andrzej and Zofia. Pilecki actively supported the local farming community. He was also an amateur poet and painter. He organized the Krakus Military Horsemen Training program in 1932 and was appointed to command the 1st Lida Military Training Squadron, which in 1937 was placed under the Polish 19th Infantry Division. In 1938, Pilecki received the Silver Cross of Merit for his activities.

== World War II ==
=== Polish September Campaign ===
With Polish–German tensions growing in mid-1939, Pilecki was mobilized as a cavalry platoon commander on 26 August 1939. He was assigned to the 19th Infantry Division under Major General Józef Kwaciszewski, part of the Army Prusy and his unit took part in heavy fighting against the advancing Germans during the invasion of Poland. The 19th Division was almost completely destroyed following a clash with the German forces on the night of 5/6 September at the Battle of Piotrków Trybunalski. Its remains were incorporated into the 41st Infantry Division, which was withdrawn to the southeast toward Lwów (now Lviv, Ukraine) and the Romanian bridgehead. In the 41st Division, Pilecki served as divisional second-in-command of its cavalry detachment, under Major Jan Włodarkiewicz. He and his men destroyed seven German tanks, shot down one aircraft, and destroyed two more on the ground. On 17 September, the Soviet Union invaded eastern Poland, which worsened the already desperate situation of the Polish forces. On 22 September, the 41st Division suffered a major defeat and capitulated. Włodarkiewicz and Pilecki were among the many soldiers who did not follow the order of Commander-in-Chief General Edward Śmigły-Rydz to retreat through Romania to France, instead opting to stay underground in Poland.

=== Resistance ===
On 9 November 1939 in Warsaw, Major Włodarkiewicz, Second Lieutenant Pilecki, Second Lieutenant Jerzy Maringe, Jerzy Skoczyński, and brothers Jan and Stanisław Dangel founded the Secret Polish Army (Tajna Armia Polska, TAP), one of the first underground organizations in Poland. Włodarkiewicz became its leader, while Pilecki became TAP's organizational head as it expanded to cover Warsaw, Siedlce, Radom, Lublin, and other major cities in central Poland. As cover, Pilecki worked as manager of a cosmetics storehouse. From 25 November 1939 until May 1940, he was TAP's inspector and chief of staff. From August 1940, he headed its 1st branch (organization and mobilization).

TAP was based on Christian ideological values. While Pilecki wanted to avert a religious mission so as not to alienate potential allies, Włodarkiewicz blamed Poland's defeat on its failure to create a Catholic nation and wanted to remake the country by appealing to right-wing groups. In the spring of 1940, Pilecki saw that Włodarkiewicz's views had become more antisemitic and that he had put ultranationalist dogma into their newsletter, Znak; Włodarkiewicz had also entered into talks about a merger with the far-right underground, including a group that had offered Nazi Germany a Polish puppet government. To stop him, Pilecki went to Colonel Stefan Rowecki, chief of a rival resistance group, the Union of Armed Struggle (Związek Walki Zbrojnej, ZWZ), which called for equal rights for Jews, gathered intelligence on German atrocities, and delivered it by courier to the Western Allies in an attempt to gain their involvement. The ZWZ had alerted the Polish Government-in-Exile that the Germans were inciting Polish hatred against the Jews, and that this might lead to the rise of a Polish Quisling.

Pilecki called for TAP to submit to Rowecki's authority, but Włodarkiewicz refused and issued a manifesto that the future Poland had to be Christian, based on national identity, and that those who opposed the idea should be "removed from our lands". Pilecki refused to swear the proposed oath. In August, Włodarkiewicz announced at a TAP meeting that they would, after all, join the mainstream underground with Rowecki – and that it had been proposed that Pilecki should infiltrate the Auschwitz concentration camp. Little was known about how the Germans ran the then-new camp, which was thought to be an internment camp or large prison rather than a death camp. Włodarkiewicz said it was not an order but an invitation to volunteer, though Pilecki saw it as a punishment for refusing to back Włodarkiewicz's ideology. Nevertheless, he agreed, which years later led to him being described in many sources as having volunteered to infiltrate Auschwitz.

==== Auschwitz ====
Pilecki was one of 2,000 men arrested on 19 September 1940. He used the identity documents of Tomasz Serafiński, who had been mistakenly assumed to be dead. Two backstories exist purporting to explain how Pilecki actually found himself in Auschwitz. In one version, he allowed himself to be captured by the occupying Germans in one of their Warsaw street round-ups, in order to infiltrate the camp. In the second version, he did that in the apartment of Eleonora Ostrowska, at ulica Wojska Polskiego (Polish Army Street) during a building search. Afterward, along with 1,705 other prisoners, between 21 and 22 September 1940, Pilecki reached Auschwitz where, under Serafiński's name, he was assigned prisoner number 4859. In autumn of 1941 he learnt that he had been promoted to porucznik (first lieutenant) by people "far away in the outside world in Warsaw".

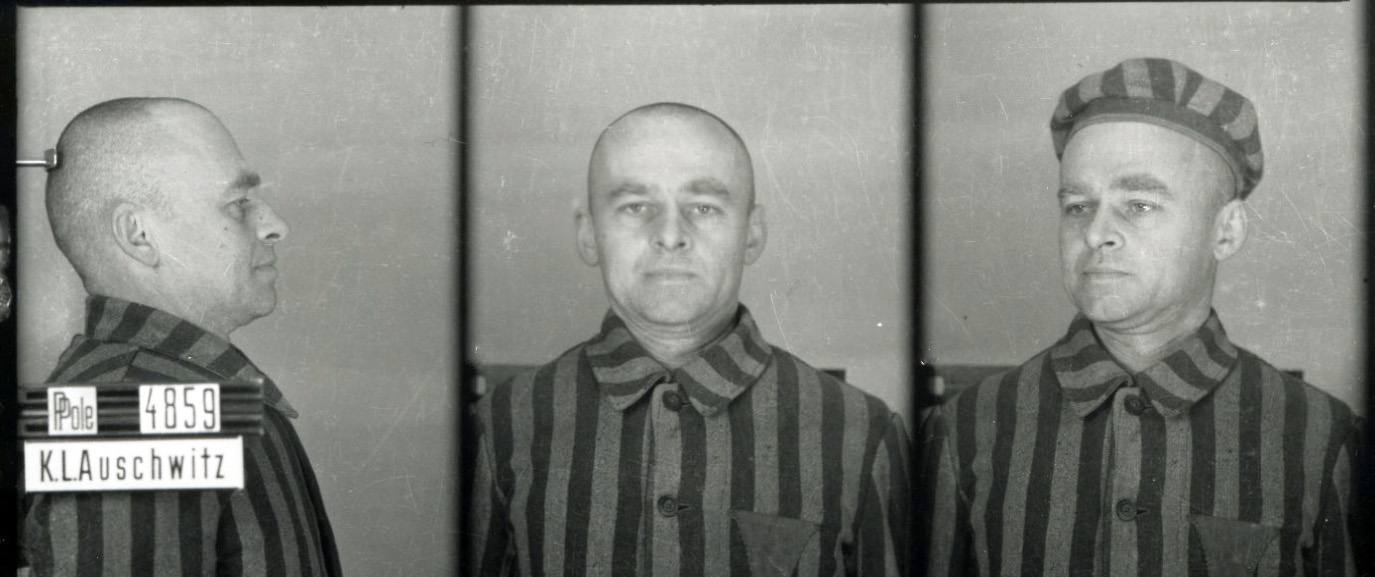
Witold Pilecki as KL-Auschwitz prisoner KL Number 4859, 1940

While in various slave labour kommandos and surviving pneumonia at Auschwitz, Pilecki organized an underground Military Organization Union (Związek Organizacji Wojskowej, ZOW). Its tasks were to improve the morale of the inmates, provide news from outside the camp, distribute extra food and clothing to its members, set up intelligence networks, and train detachments to take over the camp in the event of a relief attack. ZOW was organized as secret cells, each of five members. Over time, many smaller underground organizations at Auschwitz eventually merged with ZOW.

As part of his duties, Pilecki secretly drew up reports and sent them to Home Army headquarters with the help of inmates that had been released or escapees. The first dispatch, delivered in October 1940, described the camp and the ongoing extermination of inmates via starvation and brutal punishments; it was used as the basis of a Home Army report on "The terror and lawlessness of the occupiers". Further dispatches of Pilecki's were likewise smuggled out by inmates who managed to escape from Auschwitz. The reports' purpose may have been to get the Home Army command's permission for ZOW to stage an uprising to liberate the camp; however, no such response came from the Home Army. In 1942, Pilecki's resistance movement was also using a home-made radio transmitter to broadcast details on the number of arrivals and deaths in the camp and the conditions of the inmates. The secret radio station was built over seven months using smuggled parts. It broadcast from the camp until the autumn of 1942, when it was dismantled by Pilecki's men after concerns that the Germans might discover its location because of "one of our fellows' big mouth". The information provided by Pilecki was a principal source of intelligence on Auschwitz for the Western Allies. Pilecki hoped that either the Allies would drop arms or troops into the camp, or that the Home Army would organize an assault on it from outside.

The Camp Gestapo under SS-Untersturmführer Maximilian Grabner redoubled its efforts to ferret out ZOW members, killing many of them. To avoid the worst outcome, Pilecki decided to break out of the camp with the hope of convincing Home Army leaders that a rescue attempt was a valid option. On the night of 26–27 April 1943 Pilecki was assigned to a night shift at a camp bakery outside the fence, and he and two comrades managed to force open a metal door, overpower a guard, cut the telephone line, and escape outside the camp perimeter. They left the SS guards in the woodshed, barricaded from outside. Before escaping they cut an alarm wire. They headed east, and after several hours crossed into the General Government, taking with them documents stolen from the Germans. The men fled on foot to the village of Alwernia where they were helped by a priest, and then on to Tyniec where locals assisted them. Later, they reached the Polish resistance safe house near Bochnia, owned, coincidentally, by commander Tomasz Serafiński—the very man whose identity Pilecki had adopted for his cover in Auschwitz. At one point during the journey, German soldiers attempted to stop Pilecki, firing at him as he fled; several bullets passed through his clothing, while one wounded him without hitting either bones or vital organs.

==== Outside Auschwitz ====
After several days as a fugitive, Pilecki made contact with units of the Home Army. In June 1943, in Nowy Wiśnicz, Pilecki drafted a report on the situation in Auschwitz. It was buried at the farm where he was staying and was only revealed after his death. In August 1943, back in Warsaw, Pilecki started preparing Witold's Report (Raport W), which focused on the Auschwitz underground. It covered three main topics: ZOW and its members; Pilecki's experiences; and to a lesser extent, the extermination of prisoners, including Jews. Pilecki's intent in writing it was to persuade the Home Army to liberate the camp's prisoners. However, the Home Army command judged such an attack would fail. Even if the initial attack were successful, the resistance lacked sufficient transport capabilities, supplies, and the shelter that would be required for the rescued inmates. The Soviet Red Army, despite being within attacking distance of the camp, showed no interest in a joint effort with the Home Army and the ZOW to free it.

Shortly after rejoining the resistance, Pilecki became a member of the Kedyw sabotage unit, using the pseudonym Roman Jezierski. He also joined a secret anti-communist organization, NIE. On 19 February 1944 he was promoted to cavalry captain (rotmistrz). Until becoming involved in the Warsaw Uprising, Pilecki continued coordinating ZOW and Home Army activities and providing ZOW with what limited support he could.

In Auschwitz, Pilecki had met the author Igor Newerly, whose Jewish wife, Barbara, was hiding in Warsaw. The Newerlys had been working with Janusz Korczak to try to save Jewish lives. Pilecki gave Barbara Newerly money from the Polish resistance, which she passed on to several Jewish families whom she and her husband protected. He also gave her money to pay off her own szmalcownik, or blackmailer, who said he was Jewish and threatened to report her to the Gestapo. The blackmailer disappeared, with Jack Fairweather concluding that "it is likely that Witold arranged for his execution".

==== Warsaw Uprising ====
When the Warsaw Uprising broke out on 1 August 1944, Pilecki volunteered for service with Warszawianka Company of Kedyw's Chrobry II Battalion. Initially, he served as a common soldier in the northern city centre, without revealing his rank to his superiors. After many officers were killed in the early days of the uprising, Pilecki revealed his true identity and accepted command of the 1st "Warszawianka" Company deployed in Warsaw's Śródmieście (downtown) district. After the fall of the uprising, which ended on 2 October that year, he was captured and taken prisoner by the Germans. He was sent to Oflag VII-A, a prison-of-war camp for Polish officers located north of Murnau, Bavaria, where he remained until the prisoners were liberated on 29 April 1945.

== After the war ==
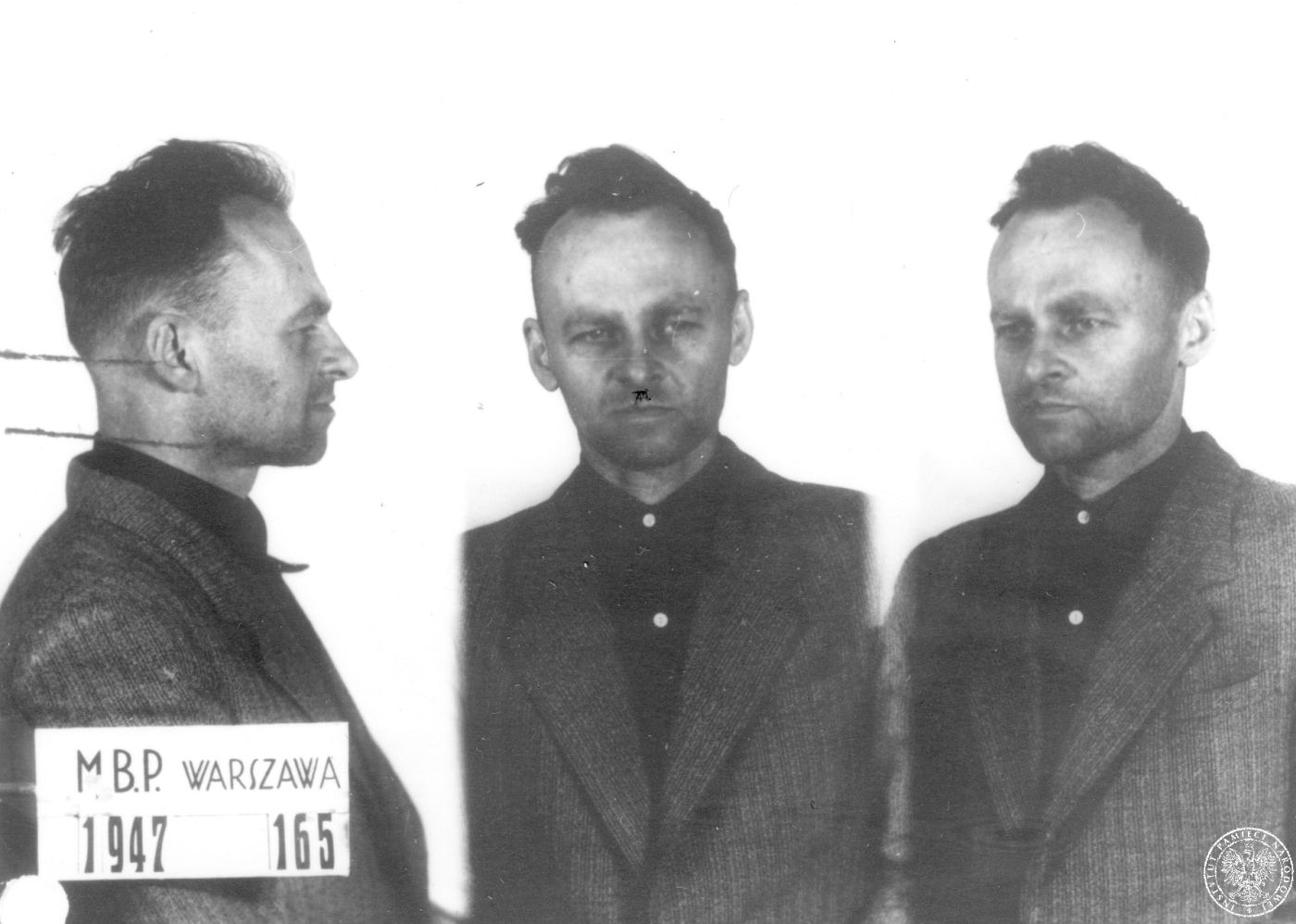
Pilecki, Mokotów Prison, Warsaw, 1947

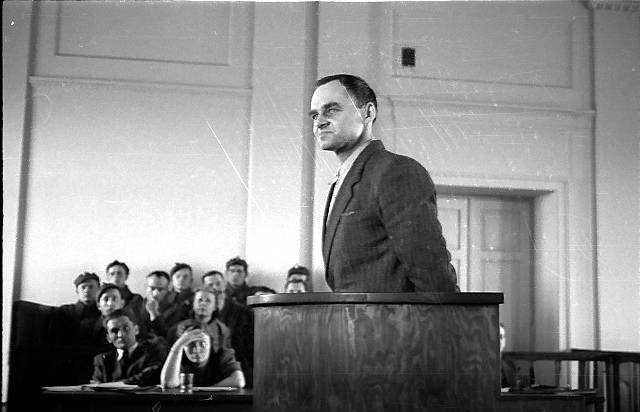
Pilecki in court, 1948

In July 1945, Pilecki joined the military intelligence division of the Polish II Corps under Lieutenant General Władysław Anders in Ancona, Italy. In October 1945, as relations between the government-in-exile and the Soviet-backed regime of Bolesław Bierut kept deteriorating, Pilecki was ordered by Anders and his intelligence chief, Lieutenant Colonel Stanisław Kijak, to return to Poland and report on the prevailing military and political situation under Soviet occupation. By December 1945 he had arrived in Warsaw and begun organizing an intelligence gathering network. As the NIE organization had been disbanded, Pilecki recruited former ZOW and TAP members and continued sending information to the government-in-exile.

To maintain his cover identity, Pilecki lived under various assumed names and changed jobs frequently. He worked as a jewellery salesman, a bottle label painter, and as the night manager of a construction warehouse. However, in July 1946 he was informed that his identity had been uncovered by the Ministry of Public Security. Anders ordered him to leave Poland, but Pilecki was reluctant to comply because he had a family in the country and his wife was unwilling to emigrate with their children, as well as due to a lack of a suitable replacement. In early 1947, his superiors rescinded the order.

Arrested on 8 May 1947 by the communist authorities, Pilecki was tortured, but in order to protect other operatives, he did not reveal any sensitive information. His case was supervised by Colonel Roman Romkowski. A show trial, chaired by Lieutenant Colonel Jan Hryckowian, took place on 3 March 1948. Pilecki was charged with illegal border crossings, use of forged documents, failure to enlist in the military, the carrying of illegal firearms, espionage for Anders, espionage for "foreign imperialism" (government-in-exile), and assassination plots against several officials of the Ministry of Public Security. Pilecki denied the assassination charges, as well as espionage, although he admitted to passing information to the II Corps, of which he considered himself an officer and thus claimed that he was not breaking any laws. He pleaded guilty to the other charges. He was sentenced to death on 15 May with three of his comrades. Pleas for pardon from a number of Auschwitz survivors were ignored; one of their recipients was Polish prime minister Józef Cyrankiewicz, also an Auschwitz survivor. Cyrankiewicz, who had already testified at the trial, instead wrote that Pilecki must be treated harshly as an "enemy of the state". Subsequently, on 25 May 1948, Pilecki was executed by Piotr Śmietański with a shot to the back of the head at the Mokotów Prison in Warsaw. Several of Pilecki's affiliates were also arrested and tried around the same time, with at least three executed as well; a number of others received death sentences that were commuted to prison sentences.

Pilecki's burial place has never been found, though it is thought to be in Warsaw's Powązki Cemetery.

== Legacy ==
Pilecki's life has been a subject of several monographs. The first in English was Józef Garliński's Fighting Auschwitz: The Resistance Movement in the Concentration Camp (1975), followed by M. R. D. Foot's Six Faces of Courage (1978). The first in Polish was the Rotmistrz Pilecki (1995) by Wiesław Jan Wysocki, followed by Ochotnik do Auschwitz. Witold Pilecki 1901–1948 (2000) by Adam Cyra. In 2010, Italian historian Marco Patricelli wrote a book about Witold Pilecki, Il volontario (2010), which received the Acqui Award of History that year. In 2012, Pilecki's Auschwitz diary was translated into English by Garliński and published under the title The Auschwitz Volunteer: Beyond Bravery. Poland's Chief Rabbi, Michael Schudrich, wrote in the foreword to a 2012 English translation of Pilecki's report: "When God created the human being, God had in mind that we should all be like Captain Witold Pilecki, of blessed memory." Historian Norman Davies wrote in the introduction to the same translation: "If there was an Allied hero who deserved to be remembered and celebrated, this was a person with few peers." More recently Pilecki was the subject of Adam J. Koch's 2018 book A Captain’s Portrait: Witold Pilecki – Martyr for Truth and Jack Fairweather's 2019 book The Volunteer: The True Story of the Resistance Hero Who Infiltrated Auschwitz, the latter a winner of the Costa Book Award.

From the 1990s, following the fall of communism in Poland and Pilecki's subsequent rehabilitation, he has been a subject of popular discourse. A number of institutions, monuments, and streets in Poland have been named after him. In 1995, he was awarded the Order of Polonia Restituta, and in 2006, the highest Polish decoration, the Order of the White Eagle. On 6 September 2013, the Minister of National Defence announced his promotion to colonel. In 2012, Powązki Cemetery was partly excavated in an unsuccessful effort to find his remains.

In 2016, The Pilecki Family House Museum (Dom Rodziny Pileckich) was established in Ostrów Mazowiecka; it opened officially in 2019, but its permanent exhibition is still being prepared, with public opening planned for May 2022. The year 2017 saw the founding of the Pilecki Institute, a Polish government institution commemorating persons who helped Polish victims of war crimes and crimes against peace or humanity in the years 1917–1990.

The 2006 film Śmierć rotmistrza Pileckiego ("The Death of Cavalry Captain Pilecki"), directed by Ryszard Bugajski, presents Pilecki as an ethically flawless man facing unfounded accusations. The narrative structure is reminiscent of a saint's martyrology, with belief in God replaced by belief in Country.

In 2014, the Swedish band Sabaton recorded a song about him, "Inmate 4859", on the album Heroes.

A 2015 film, Pilecki, by Marcin Kwaśny, portrays Pilecki as an independence-movement saint. The sacralization is achieved by recounting verified historical facts, along with dramatized scenes. The film shows Pilecki performing deeds impossible for an ordinary man, while keeping faith with his country even under the direst torture.

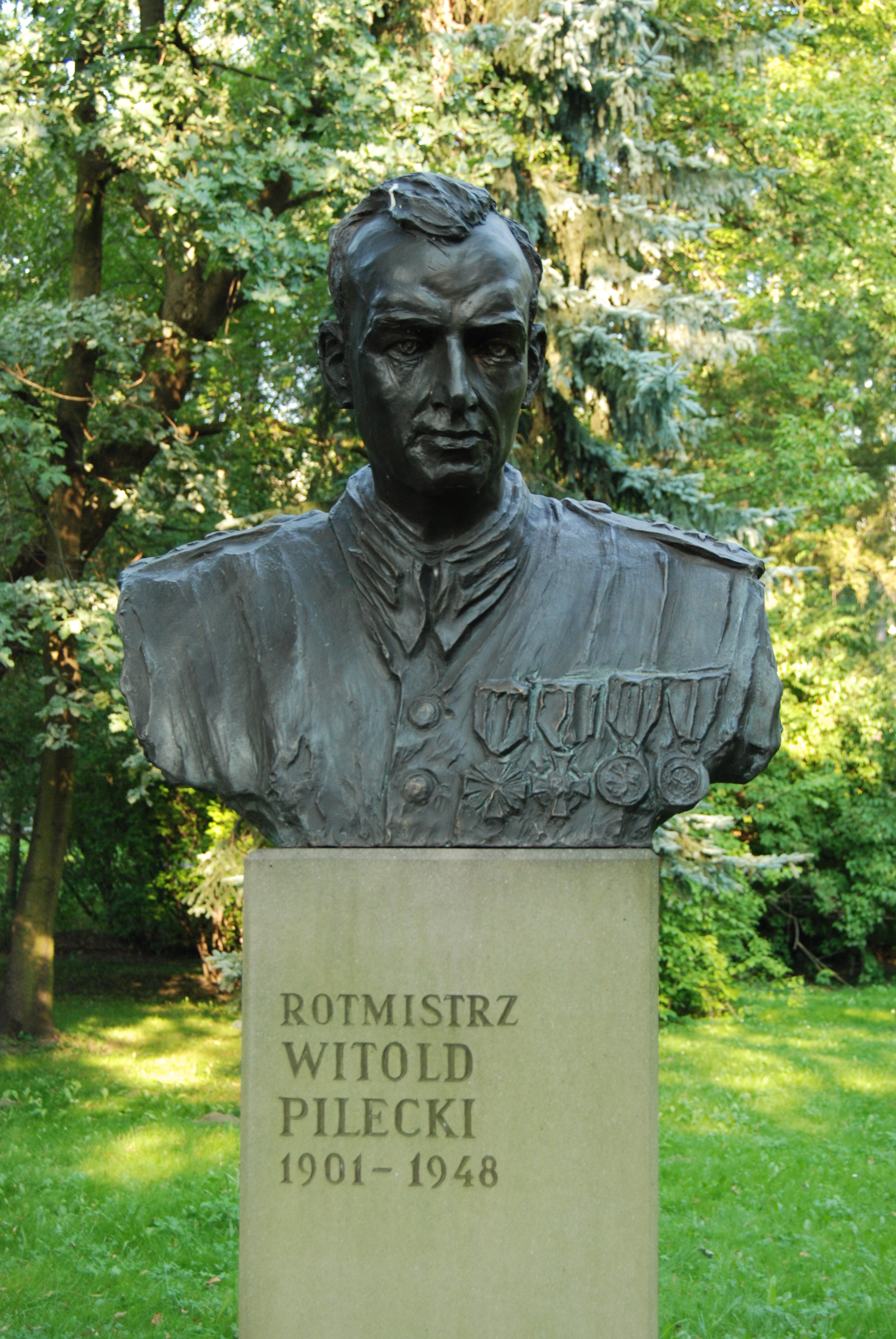
Monument to Pilecki in Kraków

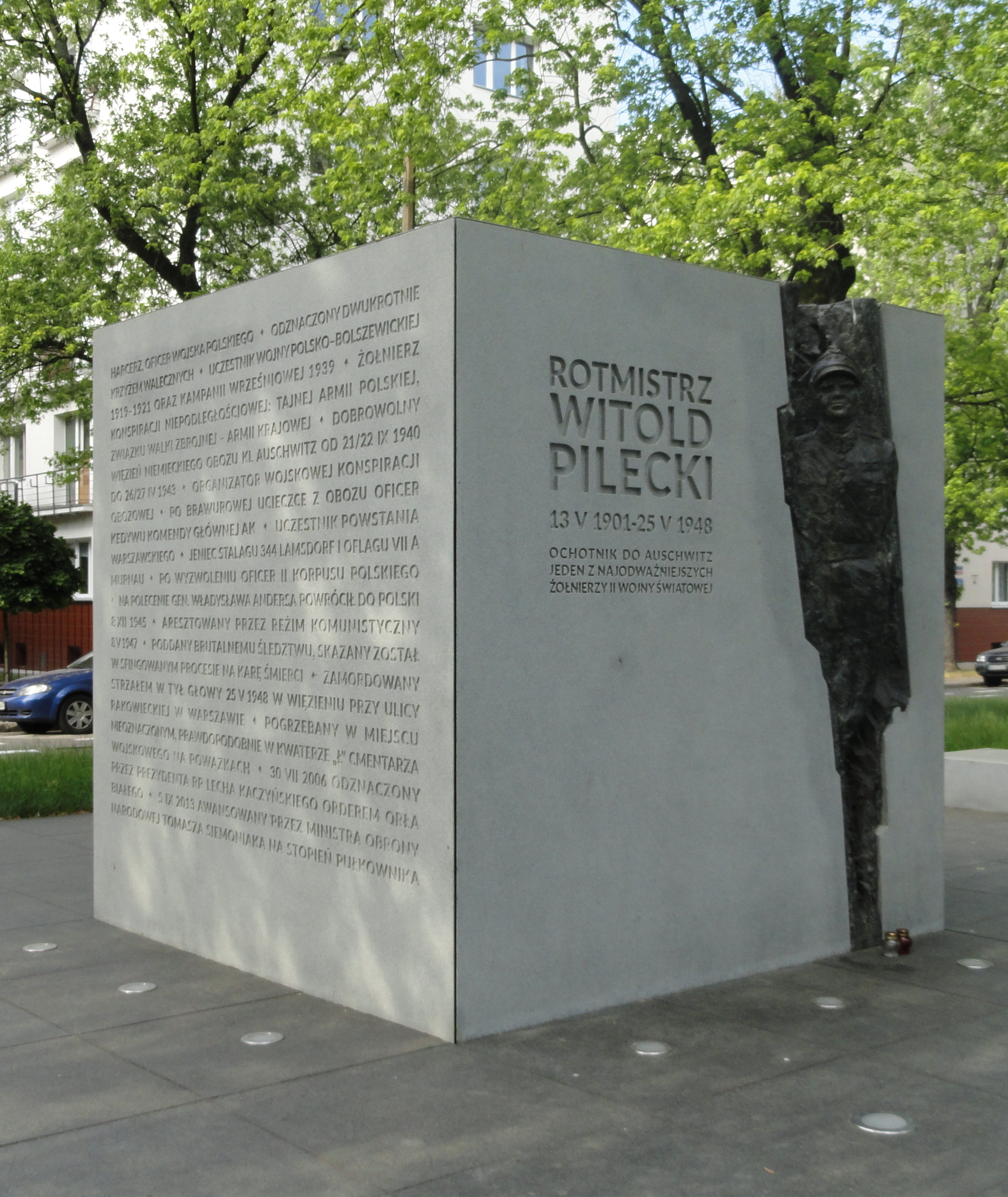
Monument to Witold Pilecki in Warsaw
