= Jan Włodarkiewicz =

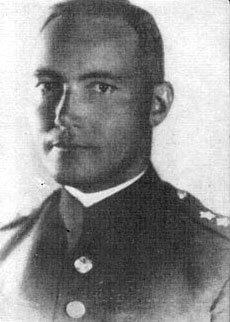
- Born: 28 May 1900; Warsaw, Congress Poland, Russian Empire
- Died: 19 March 1942 (aged 41) Lwów, Poland
- Allegiance: Poland
- Service years: 1915–1942
- Rank: lieutenant colonel
- Commands: Wachlarz
- Conflicts: World War I; Polish-Bolshevik War; World War II

Lieutenant Colonel Jan Włodarkiewicz (28 May 1900 – 19 March 1942; Polish: [ˈjan vwɔdarˈkʲɛvit͡ʂ]; noms de guerre Damian, Darwicz and Odważny) was a Polish soldier, an officer of the Polish Army and a freedom fighter during World War II. He is notable as the first commander of the Wachlarz, the first secret service formed by an underground resistance organization in occupied Europe.

Jan Włodarkiewicz was born on 28 May 1900 in Warsaw. A graduate of the prestigious Stanisław Staszic gymnasium in Warsaw, in his youth Włodarkiewicz took part in several anti-tsarist youth organizations. After the outbreak of World War I he joined the clandestine Polish Military Organization, where he received basic military training.

After the war he remained in the Polish Army and since 1918 served in all conflicts Poland fought in. Initially in the Nieśwież-based Polish 27th Uhlan Regiment, in 1929 he was assigned to the staff of the 9th Independent Cavalry brigade in Baranowicze. After his successful service there, in 1930 he was assigned to the Centre for Cavalry Training in Grudziądz. In 1935 he was promoted to rotmistrz (captain of cavalry). Since then until the outbreak of World War II he served in the Polish General Staff as an officer officially responsible for the training of reserve Polish cavalry units. In reality, he served in the Special Command entitled with organization of partisan warfare, diversion and railroad sabotage of the 2nd Department of the Polish General Staff.

After the outbreak of the Polish Defensive War of 1939 he was ordered to supervise the creation of various reserve cavalry units in the Cavalry Reserve Centre in Garwolin. On September 15 he formed a cavalry squadron out of marauders and left-overs from various units. Together with the unit, he joined the Polish 41st Infantry Division and fought in the ranks of the Lublin Army. For his merits he was promoted to major and managed to survive the defeat together with his unit. After the Polish defeat in the battle of Kock, which ended the Polish campaign, he initially wanted to break through besieged Warsaw and then, after its fall, to Hungary or Romania. However, the Soviet-German cooperation prevented him from getting close to the border and on October 15, 10 days after the last major Polish unit capitulated to the Germans, he disbanded the unit under his command in the village of Mrozy.

Włodarkiewicz and most of his men hid their weapons and broke through to Warsaw. There in November 1939 Włodarkiewicz met his wartime companion and deputy, Witold Pilecki. Together they formed the Secret Polish Army, one of the first resistance movements in Poland and the occupied Europe. In 1940 the organization melted into a larger merger of resistance groups, the Confederation of the Nation and Włodarkiewicz assumed the military command over the latter organization's forces. In summer of that year he met with Stefan Rowecki, the commander of Związek Walki Zbrojnej (ZWZ), the predecessor of Armia Krajowa. Together they formed the Wachlarz, a separate organization entitled with sabotage and intelligence between the pre-war Polish eastern border and the German Eastern Front. Włodarkiewicz was named the commander of the organization and in September 1941 he joined the ZWZ. Awarded to Lieutenant Colonel, in March 1942 he left for Lwów, where he planned to visit the local network of the 1st Sector of the Wachlarz. However, shortly after his arrival, on 19 March 1942 he died in unknown circumstances.
