= Wiesław Wysocki =

Polish historian (born 1950)

Wiesław Wysocki (born 1950) is a Polish historian who specializes in modern Polish history, particularly the World War II era.
