= Secret Polish Army =

The Secret Polish Army (Polish: Tajna Armia Polska, TAP) was a Polish resistance movement founded in November 1939 in German-occupied Poland, which was active in the voivodeships of Warsaw, Podlasie, Kielce and Lublin.

Founders were:

- Lieutenant Colonel Jan Henryk Włodarkiewicz "Darwicz" – Chief of the Staff
- Cavalry Lieutenant Witold Pilecki "Witold"
- Lieutenant Colonel Władysław Surmacki "Stefan"

In 1940, it merged with several other underground organizations into the Confederation of the Nation. In 1943, the latter became part of the Polish Home Army.

== Bibliography ==
- Kazimierz Malinowski, Tajna Armia Polska. Znak. Konfederacja Zbrojna. Zarys genezy, organizacji i działalności, Warszawa 1986. ISBN 83-211-0791-5
- Adam Cyra, Ochotnik do Auschwitz - Witold Pilecki 1901-1948, Oświęcim 2000. ISBN 83-912000-3-5
