= Stanisław Kot =

Polish historian and politician (1885–1975)

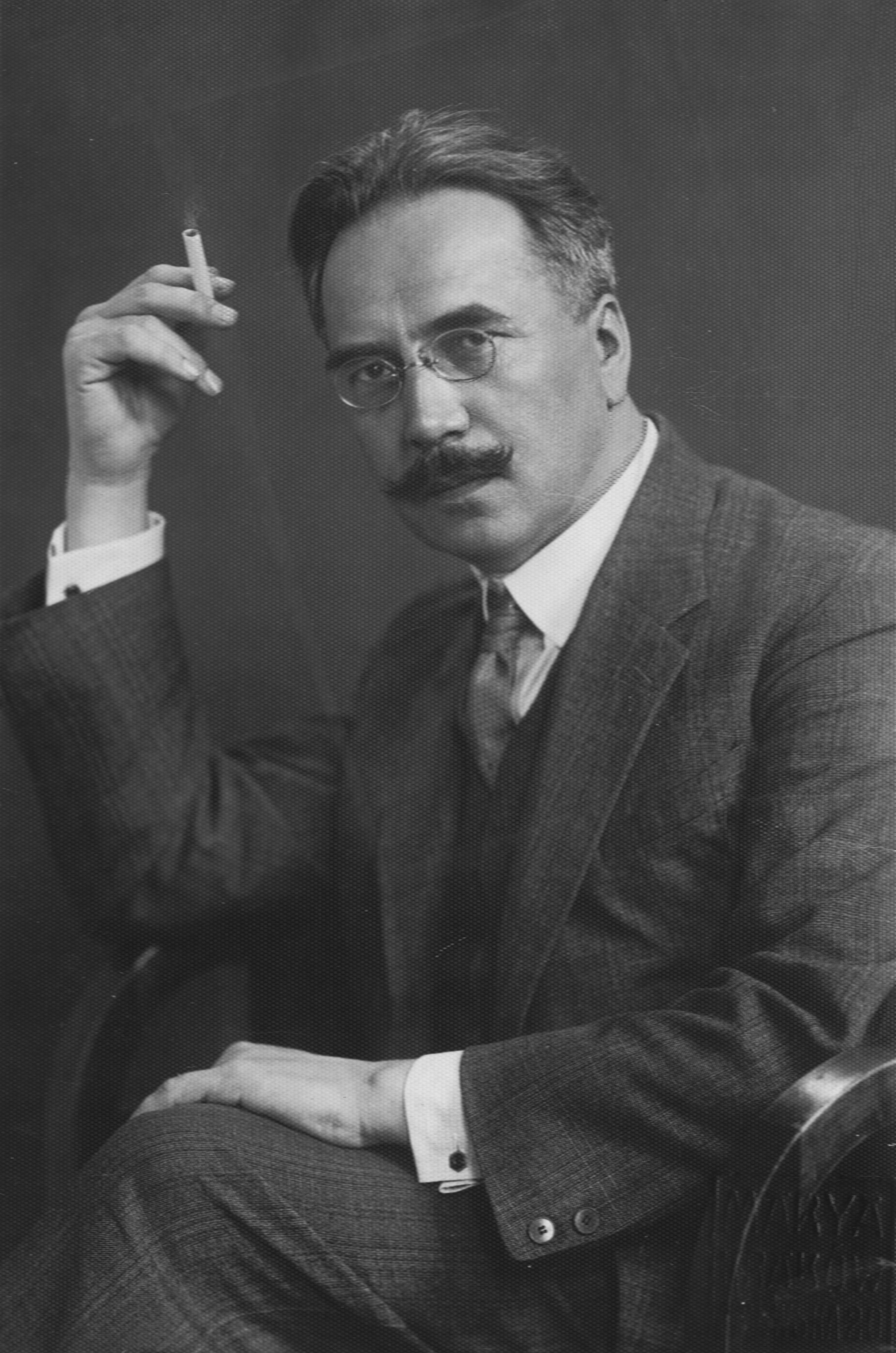
- Kot c. 1933
- Born: 22 October 1885; Ruda, Galicia, Austria-Hungary
- Died: 26 December 1975 (aged 90); London, England
- Known for: Studies about the Reformation in Poland

Academic background
- Education: Jagiellonian University

Academic work
- Discipline: Polish history
- Institutions: Jagiellonian University

Deputy Prime Minister (Polish government-in-exile)
- In office 7 December 1939 – 1940

Minister of Internal Affairs (Polish government-in-exile)
- In office 9 October 1940 – 1941

Ambassador of the Polish government-in-exile to the Soviet Union
- In office 29 August 1941 – 1942

Minister of Information and Documentation (Polish government-in-exile)
- In office 18 March 1943 – 24 November 1944

Ambassador of the Polish Provisional Government of National Unity to Italy
- In office 6 September 1945 – 10 November 1945

Personal details
- Party: People's Party (until 1945); Polish People's Party (from 1945)

Stanisław Kot (22 October 1885 – 26 December 1975) was a Polish historian and politician. A native of the Austrian partition of Poland, early in life he was attracted to the cause of Polish independence. As a professor of the Jagiellonian University (1920–1933), he held the chair of the History of Culture. His principal expertise was in the politics, ideologies, education, and literature of the 16th- and 17th-century Polish–Lithuanian Commonwealth. He is particularly known for his contributions to the study of the Reformation in Poland.

As a Second Polish Republic politician, he was a member of the People's Party; and, during World War II, he held several posts in the Polish Government in Exile, including those of Minister of the Interior (1940–1941), Minister of State (1942–1943), and Minister of Information (1943–1944). He also served, during the war, as Polish ambassador to the Soviet Union (1941–1942); and shortly after the war, as Polish ambassador to Italy (1945–1947).

In 1947, in the wake of the communist takeover of Poland, he became a political refugee, living in France and later in the United Kingdom, where he was the leader of the People's Party in exile.

== Early life and education ==
Kot was born into a peasant family in Ruda, in the Austrian-partition Galicia region of Austro-Hungary. His father Marcin, a leading citizen of the village, could read and write, and was involved in the patriotic movement of Lesser Poland, the historic region to which Ruda belonged. Kot attended elementary school in Czarna and Sędziszów and gymnasium in Rzeszów, and became active in Polish-independence youth groups in Galicia, part of the Austrian partition of Poland.

In 1904 he matriculated in law at Lwów University, (Note: Kot's most influential teachers at Lwów included Wilhelm Bruchnalski, Józef Kallenbach, Ludwik Finkel, and Bolesław Mańkowski.) but in 1905 he transferred to Kraków's Jagiellonian University, where in 1909 he obtained a Ph.D. in classics for a thesis on The Influence of the Political Theories of Classical Antiquity on the Political Ideas of Sixteenth-Century Poland, with Special Reference to Andrzej Frycz Modrzewski. At university he was active in the student socialist movement, cooperating with the Polish Social Democratic Party of Galicia, and clashed with right-wing National Democrats over his insistence on respecting the rights of the region's ethnic Ukrainian citizens. Kot also rejected the National Democrats' antisemitism.

== Career ==
=== Schoolteaching and World War I ===
In 1908–1912 he taught at secondary schools in Lwów (now Lviv, Ukraine) and Kraków. In 1911 he married Ida Proksch. In 1912–1914, thanks to a scholarship from the Polish Academy of Arts and Sciences, he studied in France and made several study trips to Germany, the Netherlands, Switzerland, and Belgium.

During World War I he was active in politics, culture, and education, working with the Polish Legions. From 1915 he headed the Press Department of the Polish Supreme National Committee. From 1914 to 1917 or 1919 (sources vary) he published a newspaper, Wiadomości Polskie (Polish News); during that time, his political views shifted from left-leaning to centrist. However, he preferred scholarly over political work, and during the 1920s he took little part, if any, in politics.

=== Historian ===
Kot published his first scholarly work in 1910, about Andrzej Frycz Modrzewski's views on education. His early research thus began with the history of education in Poland, but over time his interest gravitated toward the history of culture, in particular the Reformation in Poland. After Poland had in November 1918 regained independence, incarnated as the Second Polish Republic, Kot in 1919 co-founded a publishing house, Krakowska Spółka Wydawnicza, best known for publishing the book series, Biblioteka Narodowa (The National Library), which continues to the present; up to the outbreak of World War II, he oversaw the publication of 177 volumes. He also edited another book series, Biblioteka Pisarzów Polskich (The Library of Polish Writers).

In 1920 Kot habilitated his doctorate and was appointed a professor at Kraków's Jagiellonian University, in 1924 earning a full professorship and holding a chair in the History of Culture newly created for him. Kot was popular with his students, particularly those from ethnic minorities, and has been described as "a strong opponent of nationalism and antisemitism". His opposition to the antisemitism then common among Polish chauvinists has been attributed to the political activism that he had begun in his student days.

In 1919 Kot published a biography of Modrzewski which, as of 1999, was still considered the most exhaustive and reliable work on the subject. In 1932 he published a book on Socinianism in Poland: The Social and Political Ideas of the Polish Antitrinitarians in the Sixteenth and Seventeenth Centuries – a detailed monograph on the Polish Brethren – which appeared in English in 1957 and is considered his most influential monograph. He also published a well-received textbook, Historia Wychowania (History of Education; first, single-volume edition, 1924; second, revised, two-volume edition, 1933–1934).

From 1921 until 1939 he edited the quarterly, Reformacja w Polsce (The Reformation in Poland), which he had established; it was published by the Society for Research into the History of the Reformation. For a while he also edited another journal, Archiwum do dziejów literatury i oświaty (Archive for the History of Literature and Education), published by the Polish Academy of Arts and Sciences. In 1921 he became a corresponding member of the said Academy, in 1928 advancing to a full active member. In 1927 he became a member of the PEN Club. In 1929 he was inducted into the Royal Bohemian Society of Sciences. In 1930 he organized a large academic conference dedicated to the study of the 16th-century Polish poet Jan Kochanowski. From 1929 to 1939 Kot was chairman of the Commission for the History of Education and Schools in Poland. In 1935 or 1937 (sources vary) he was a guest lecturer at Paris' Collège de France. In 1941 he received an honorary degree from Oxford University, where he also lectured that year; and in 1959, from the University of Basel.

Kot's main scholarly expertise comprised the politics, ideologies, and literature of the 16th- and 17th-century Polish-Lithuanian Commonwealth. In particular, he specialized in the Reformation in Poland, the history of education in Poland, Poland's cultural contacts with the West, historical Polish political thought and doctrines, and observations of Polish national characteristics. His studies of Polish emigrations to Western Europe and to cities in France, Germany, and Italy were trailblazing.

Wiktor Weintraub writes that Kot was a university professor for a period of only thirteen years, cut short by the consequences of his political activities; and that, in assessing Kot the scholar, "one cannot avoid a certain feeling of frustration" since, while he produced substantial research in the decade following his 1909 Ph.D. degree, despite the disruptions of World War I, his subsequent scholarship lost its initial drive and was not as productive.

=== Politician ===
==== 1930s ====
In the early 1930s Kot participated in protests directed against the government. One protest opposed a reform of the educational system. In 1933, when the Sanation government controlled by Józef Piłsudski was mistreating political prisoners at the Brześć fortress, Kot was a principal organizer of a protest by university professors.

Soon after, in September 1933, due to the Sanation government's pressure Kot, then aged 48, was forced to take early retirement from Jagiellonian University; this was widely seen as retribution for his political activities, such as his connection with professors' resistance against the suppression of university autonomy and in connection with protests against the government's imprisonment of Centrolew politicians. From that point on, Kot would focus an increasing amount of his time on politics, and less and less on scholarly activities.

In 1933 Kot joined the People's Party and from 1936 to 1939 was a member of its executive committee. He was aligned with the party's right wing, and was also involved in the Front Morges political alliance. He acted on Wincenty Witos' behalf in Poland (Witos then being in foreign exile) and helped organize a 1937 rural strike, leading to his two-day arrest by Polish authorities.

==== World War II ====
In 1939, after the German invasion of Poland and the start of the Second World War, Kot escaped to Romania, then through Hungary and Switzerland to France, where in October 1939 he took part in forming the Polish Government in Exile. That December he became its Deputy Prime Minister or Deputy Secretary of State. He worked closely with Prime Minister Władysław Sikorski and was a vocal opponent of Sanation, which was now in the political opposition. In February 1940, Kot met in Paris with the resistance envoy Jan Karski, who had just arrived from Poland. Karski's report stated that German policies were oppressive, and that the Polish Jewish community was being singled out for especially harsh treatment. In the spring of 1940, meeting with representatives of British Jewry in France, Kot criticized the bulk of Poland's Jews for failing to assimilate into Polish society and suggested that, after the war, most Jews would have to leave Poland. From October 1940 to August 1941 Kot was Minister of the Interior. He was also active in preserving Polish culture, supporting Polish artists, educators, and scholars through the Fund for National Culture. In New York City in 1942, he cofounded the Polish Institute of Arts and Sciences of America (PIASA).

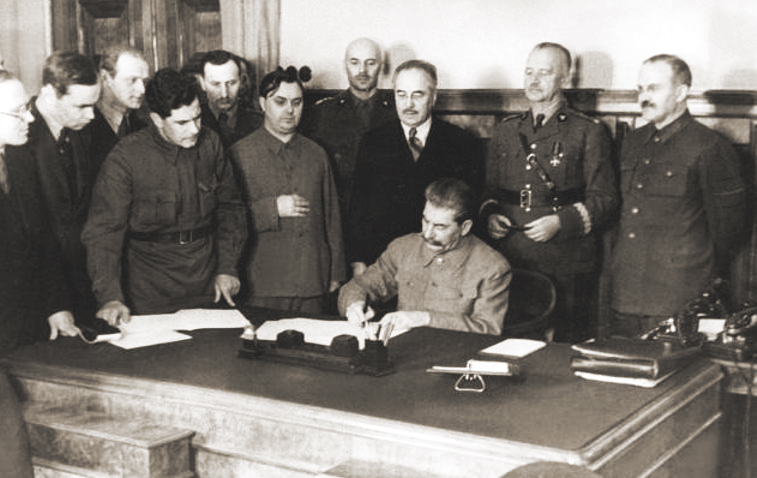
Stalin signs the Soviet-Polish declaration, 4 December 1941. Poles include Sikorski, Anders, Kot (behind Stalin, in dark suit).

Following the German invasion of the Soviet Union in 1941 and the subsequent reestablishment of diplomatic relations between Poland and the Soviet Union (severed upon the Soviet invasion of Poland), from November 1941 until July 1942 Kot was Polish Ambassador to the Soviet Union in Moscow. In that capacity he was very active in helping Polish refugees in the Soviet Union. One of his main responsibilities was to ensure the "rapid release of all Poles held in Soviet prisons and camps" and to establish Polish consulates on Soviet territory. Despite his attempts, he failed to secure the release of some, including Polish-Jewish Bund and Second International executive-committee members Viktor Alter and Henryk Ehrlich. He objected to the creation of a separate Jewish Legion within the Anders Army – a question that divided the Jewish community itself.

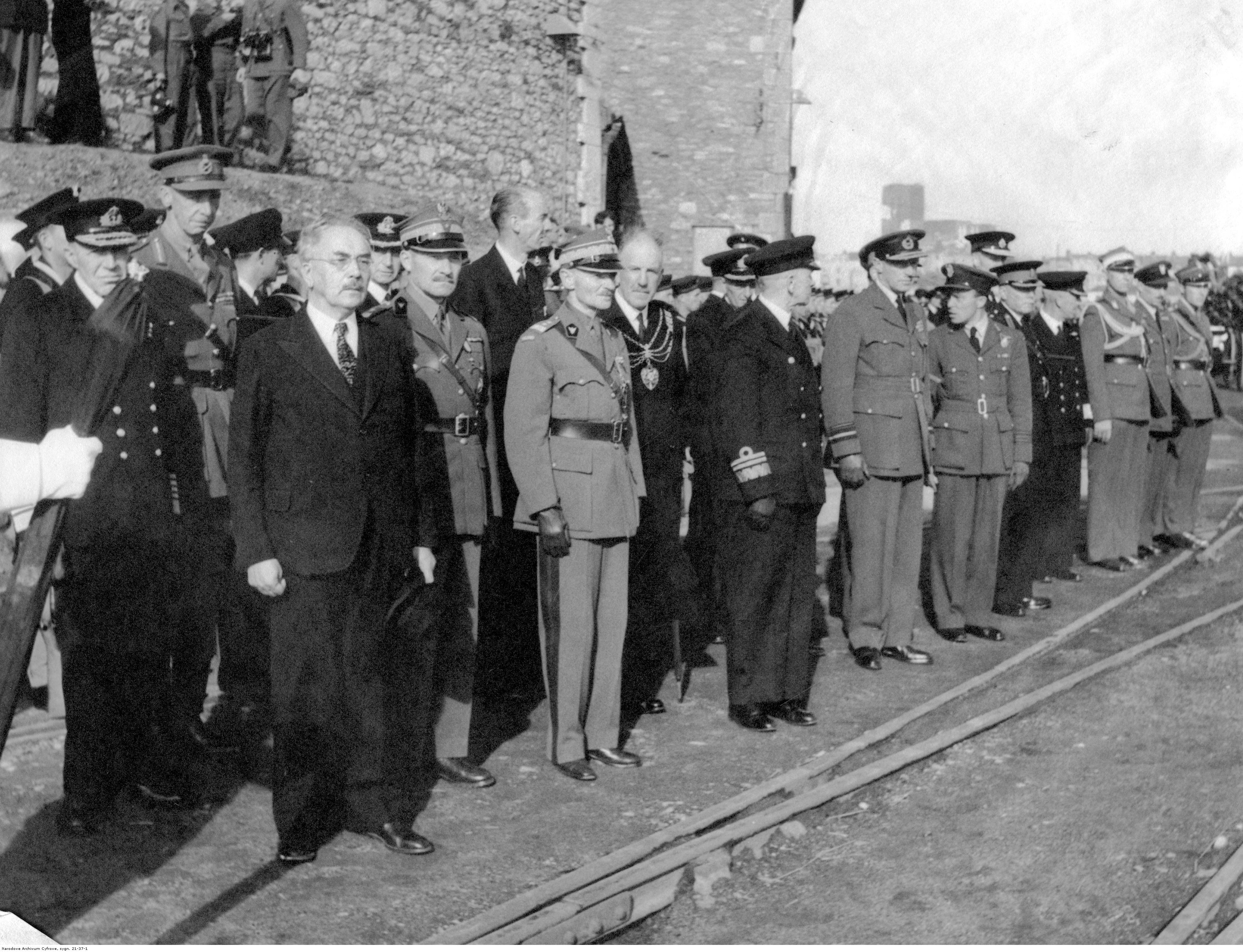
Kot (front left), Sikorski's funeral, 1943

After Kot's tour of duty as Poland's ambassador to the Soviet Union, until 1943 he served as Polish Minister of State in the Near East, where substantial Polish armed forces were stationed. From March 1943 Kot was the Polish exile government's Minister of Information. One of his most memorable acts in this capacity was the public disclosure, on 17 April that year, of the Katyn Massacre. In that communiqué, the Polish government asked for a Red Cross investigation. This was rejected by Stalin, who used the fact that the Germans had also requested such an investigation as "proof" of a Polish-German conspiracy, and turned it into a pretext for breaking off Polish-Soviet diplomatic relations. After Prime Minister Sikorski's death on 4 July 1943 at Gibraltar, President Władysław Raczkiewicz asked Stanisław Mikołajczyk, who had been acting Prime Minister in General Sikorski's absence, to form a government. Kot retained his post as Minister of Information in Mikolajczyk's cabinet until 1944.

=== Post-World War II ===
In July 1945 Kot returned to Poland with a number of politicians, including Stanisław Mikołajczyk, who hoped to establish a dialogue with the new communist authorities. From 1945 to 1947 Kot worked with the Provisional Government of National Unity, which sought to bring together the Polish Government-in-Exile and the Soviet-sponsored Polish communist government. Throughout most of that period Kot served as Poland's ambassador to Italy. In 1947, in the wake of staged elections and of trials suppressing People's Party activists deemed insufficiently cooperative with the Soviet-backed communists – events that marked the effective takeover of Poland by the communists – Kot, fearing persecution, resigned his post and went back into exile.

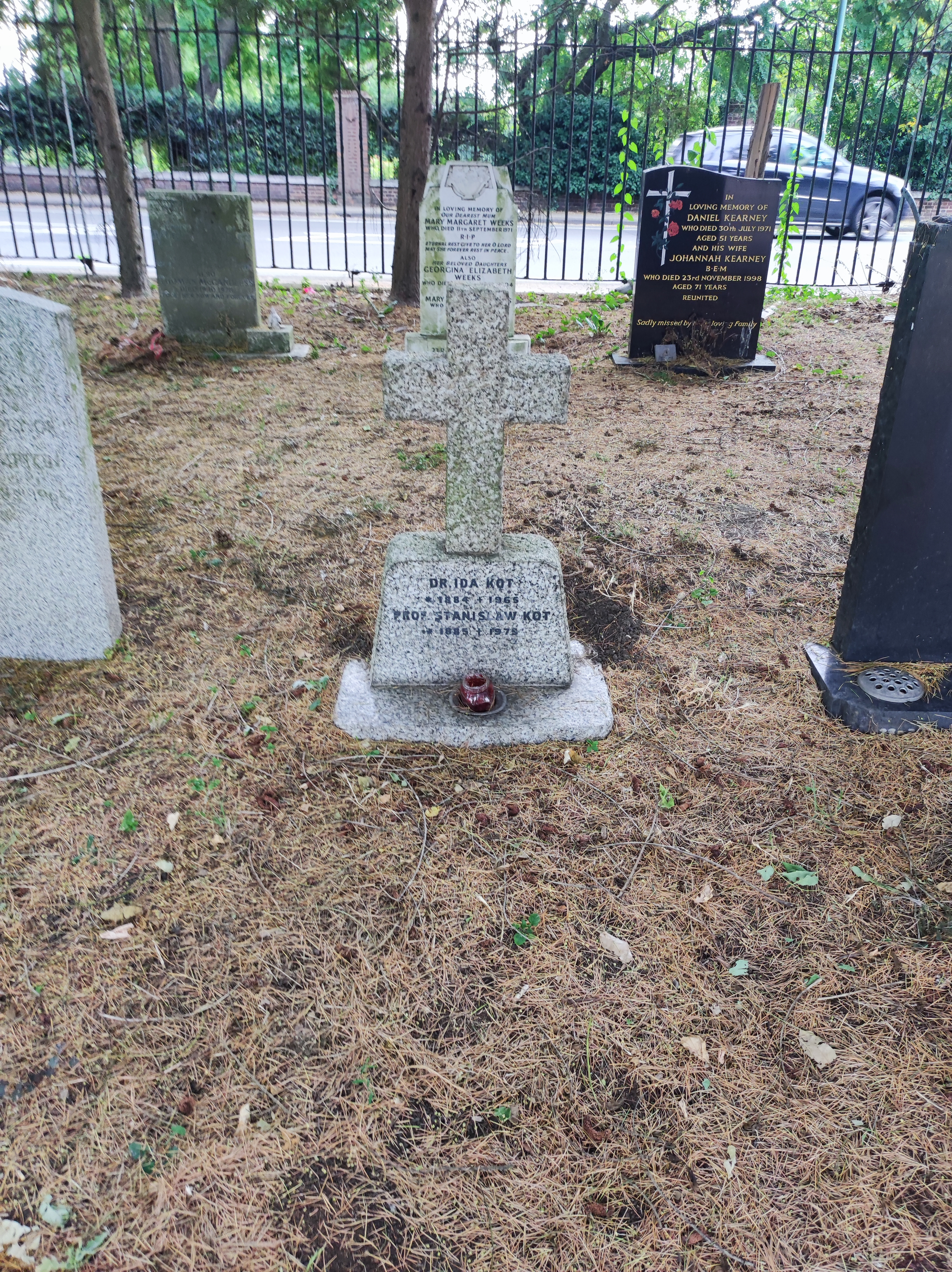
Grave at North Sheen Cemetery in Kew, London

Kot was a political refugee in Paris, before moving to the United Kingdom. In France he became involved with the International Rescue Committee. He supported the London-based Polish Government in Exile, and from 1955 was the leader of the People's Party in exile. He was also active in the International Peasant Union. He published scholarly articles in international academic journals, and memoirs of his time as Polish ambassador to the USSR. Some of his final research concerned the Polish Reformation, interactions between Polish and Western cultures, medieval proverbs, and biographies of Yuri Nemyrych and Szymon Budny. He received a grant from the Rockefeller Foundation to publish a study on the Reformation in Poland, but was unable to finish it before his health deteriorated. In January 1964 he suffered a stroke that left him in a coma for two years and thereafter bedridden and unable to work for the rest of his life. 1965 saw the publication of his memoirs, Conversations with the Kremlin and Dispatches from Russia. He died in London, England, on 26 December 1975, soon after turning 90. His funeral took place in London on 7 January 1976 at the North Sheen Cemetery.

== Legacy ==
Peter Brock and Zdzisław Pietrzyk write: "Like a long line of historians beginning in antiquity, Stanisław Kot was both a writer of history and a politician who helped to shape events. Whereas in his scholarly writings he preserved a calm impartiality, with any polemical thrust usually concealed from the reader's view, Kot from his [secondary]-school days emerged as 'a passionate politician, evoking strong emotions and partisan prejudices'."

Polish communist-era historiography described him as a reactionary leader of the extreme nationalist right, even calling him "the greatest enemy of communism and of the revolutionary currents of worker-peasant collaboration." In the West, some Polish émigrés criticized him for opposing Józef Piłsudski's interbellum Sanation political movement and for attempting to find a modus vivendi with communist authorities during and after World War II. Brock and Pietrzyk write that, while Kot was respected among the international community, he was ostracized by many Polish exiles: "the Polish exiled community... never forgave him for his return to Poland in 1945; while he, for his part, waged a relentless – and almost obsessive – war against the National Democrats and Pilsudskiites, who predominated among the exiles".

Kot the politician could be maladroit, with a tendency to suspect hostile conspiracies, especially on the part of the Sanation political movement. In 1928, Sanation founder Józef Piłsudski had relieved Władysław Sikorski of his army command; the latter would go on to become Kot's colleague in the wartime exile government. Also, in 1933, Sanation had pressured Kot into retiring prematurely from his Jagiellonian University professorial chair. Critics have seen Kot's last official appointment, as the Polish communist government's ambassador to Rome, as a disappointing end to his political career. Janusz Tazbir comments that "it is a tragedy" that, too often in Kot's life, especially after 1939, "the mediocre politician stole the limelight from the magisterial scholar". Tazbir writes that many of Kot's history writings remain valuable and continue to be reissued, as opposed to his writings on contemporary politics, which Tazbir considers properly forgotten.

According to Agnieszka Wałęga, Kot was "among the founders of the history of education as a scholarly discipline in Poland". Lucyna Hurło writes that "his works in the... history of education, culture, literature, and [the R]eformation and Antitrinitarianism exemplify [scholarly] reliability." Waclaw Soroka writes that "in Kot, the intellectual history of Poland and Eastern and Central Europe gained an outstanding researcher and exponent." Lech Szczucki has called him "likely the most influential and industrious Polish historian of the interwar period", and writes that his contribution to the study of the Polish Reformation is of extreme value. Wiktor Weintraub has termed him "one of the leading 20th-century Polish historians" and writes that "in the Polish scholarly community... Kot secured [a] position as a first-rank historian." Brock and Pietrzyk have assessed him to be a "historian of major stature". Wojciech Roszkowski and Jan Kofman summarized his life: "He left a vast scholarly legacy in the history of education and history of culture, including particularly the history of the Reformation."

Kot won high praise for his organizational activities, including his work with committees, his founding and editing of scholarly journals and book series, his organizing of conferences, his mentoring of numerous graduate students. During his years at Jagiellonian University, Kot's disciples included Henryk Barycz, Stanisław Bednarski, Wanda Bobkowska, Stanisław Bodniak, Maria Czapska, Józef Feldman, Jan Hulewicz, Alodia Kawecka-Gryczowa, Bogdan Suchodolski, Stanislaw Szczotka, Marek Wajsblum, Wiktor Weintraub, Ignacy Zarębski, and Jerzy Zathey. Kot also influenced foreign scholars, including his Italian student Delio Cantimori. Having inspired hosts of scholars, mostly through his students, many of whom became academics, he is regarded as the founder of his own historical school ("Kot's school" of the Polish Reformation). The periodical, Reformacja w Polsce (The Reformation in Poland), which he started before World War II, was revived after the war and continues to this day as the academic journal Odrodzenie i Reformacja w Polsce (The Renaissance and the Reformation in Poland).

Kot wrote 95 major studies, books, and articles. His work, however, was published in Polish and thus had less influence on international, particularly English-language, scholarship. Only one of his books was translated into English (Socinianism in Poland, 1957). Particularly after World War II, a number of his scholarly articles were published in, or translated into, languages other than Polish. During Poland's communist era, with few exceptions, censorship did not allow his works to be reprinted, discussed, or even cited.

In 1976 Jerzy Giedroyc, editor of Kultura, in Paris, called for a monograph on Kot's life. Such a work (in the form of a Festschrift) had in fact been in preparation before World War II, but the manuscript had been badly damaged during the war, and efforts to reconstruct it had been stopped by Poland's communist authorities. In December 1997 a conference on "Stanisław Kot – uczony i polityk" ("Stanisław Kot – scholar and politician") was held in Kraków, organized by Jagiellonian University. The conference included an exhibit on Kot's life and work. Conference materials were published in a 2001 book of the same title, whose cover note described Kot as "undeniably a great scholar and politician". In 2000 Tadeusz Rutkowski published a biography of Kot, Stanisław Kot 1885-1975. Biografia polityczna (Stanisław Kot 1885-1975: A Political Biography). Janusz Tazbir wrote in a review of Rutkowski's book that he himself was working on a biography of Kot the scholar, but Tazbir had not finished it before his 2016 death.

== Selected bibliography ==
- 1910: Szkoła lewartowska: z dziejów szkolnictwa ariańskiego w Polsce (The Lewartów School in the History of Arian Schools in Poland).
- History of Poland's Cultural Relations with other Countries.
- 1919: Andrzej Frycz Modrzewski
- 1924: Historia wychowania (The History of Education), 2 vols.; 2nd revised edition, 1933/34.
- 1932: Ideologia polityczna i społeczna braci polskich zwanych arianami (1957 English translation by E.M. Wilbur: Socinianism in Poland: the Social and Political Ideas of the Polish Brethren, Called Arians).
- 1958: Chyliński's Lithuanian Bible: Origin and Historical Background, Poznań, Poznańskie Towarzystwo Przyjaciół Nauk: Komisja Filologiczna, 1958, 25 pages.
