= Fighting Auschwitz =

Fighting Auschwitz: The Resistance Movement in the Concentration Camp
- Author: Józef Garliński
- Publisher: Julian Friedmann Publishers
- Publication date: 1975
- Pages: 327
- ISBN: 9780809489251
- OCLC: 29705025

Fighting Auschwitz: The Resistance Movement in the Concentration Camp is a 1975 book by Polish historian Józef Garliński about the resistance movement in Auschwitz, published by Julian Friedmann Publishers. The book's primary focus is the Związek Organizacji Wojskowej underground organization formed by the Polish resistance fighter, Witold Pilecki, known for infiltrating the Auschwitz concentration camp to organize resistance on the inside. The book, despite being close to 50 years old, is still considered a "definitive study of the topic" by modern scholars.

== Editions ==
Fragments of the book were published as early as 1970 in the France-based Polish-language émigré journal Zeszyty Historyczne. The book, based on Garliński's doctoral dissertation of 1973, was first published in Polish in 1974 as Oświęcim walczący. The 1974 Polish edition received Polish émigré awards (by the Association of Polish Writers Abroad and the Alfred Jurzykowski Foundation) for the best Polish-language book published abroad. The first English edition was published a year later in London by Julian Friedmann Publishers. As of 2006, the book had gone through seventeen editions (six in the UK, two in the US, one in France, and seven in Polish, including two underground – as the book could not be published in Poland under the communist regime and saw its first legal publication there only in 1992). The most recent edition of Fighting Auschwitz was published in 2018 by the Los Angeles–based Aquila Polonica.

== Reception and significance ==
Herbert A. Arnold reviewing the first edition for History: Reviews of New Books in 1976 concluded that it is "an interesting and informative book, but one beset with many difficulties", noting that much of the book is based on "unpublished, personal statements", and previously unknown memoirs; he also notes that Garliński has a "hidden agenda", trying to right the distortions of communist propaganda, which he find is not done most convincingly. Reviewing the same edition that year for The American Historical Review, David S. Wyman described the book as "a valuable study... clear and engaging", and concluded that the author "proves the existence of an effective underground in Auschwitz". Unlike Arnold, he observes that "the sources look solid", although he notes that the work would benefit from additional footnotes and that the title is a bit misleading, given the resistance did very little actual fighting. Finally, in his review for the Slavic Review, also published that year, Wacław W. Soroka noted that while previous works have already tackled the issue of resistance in Auschwitz, "Garliński's book is unsurpassed in its presentation of one resistance organization [the Związek Organizacji Wojskowej]", concluding that the monograph is "carefully written and documented, and includes an extensive bibliography, indexes, appendixes, and illustrations".

Adam Cyra in his 2006 obituary of Garliński noted that the book debunked a number of early myths about Auschwitz, and documented how the resistance in Auschwitz was an international effort, which involved Poles, Jews, and members of other European ethnicities and nationalities, even Germans themselves.

In his introduction to the new 2018 edition Antony Polonsky wrote that the work “remains the definitive study of the topic and has not been superseded by more recent scholarship.”

In 2019, Michael Fleming noted that the book was the first work that contained a significant discussion of Witold Pilecki, the resistance fighter for the Polish Home Army, who infiltrated Auschwitz to organize the resistance movement there.
