= The Auschwitz Volunteer =

2012 nonfiction book

The Auschwitz Volunteer: Beyond Bravery
- First English edition
- Author: Witold Pilecki with an introduction written by Norman Davies and a foreword by Michael Schudrich
- Translator: Jarek Garliński
- Publisher: Aquila Polonica
- Publication date: 2012
- Publication place: United States
- Media type: Print (Hardcover)
- Pages: 406
- ISBN: 9781607720096
- OCLC: 759173200

The Auschwitz Volunteer: Beyond Bravery is a nonfiction 2012 book consisting of a report (also described as a diary) by Polish resistance fighter Witold Pilecki, an introduction written by historian Norman Davies and a foreword by Chief Rabbi of Poland Michael Schudrich. The diary has been translated by Jarek Garliński and was published in English by Aquila Polonica. It covers a period of about four years during which Pilecki was on a mission to infiltrate the Auschwitz concentration camp. Pilecki wrote his report in Polish in the summer of 1945 for his Polish Army superiors; this book was the first time his report was published in English. His mission had two principal goals: smuggle out intelligence about the camp, and build a resistance organization among the prisoners.

== Development ==
The diary is based on the document held in the custody of the Polish Underground Movement Study Trust in London. The translator, Jarek Garliński, is the son of historian Józef Garliński who wrote one of the first English-language accounts of Pilecki's life in his 1975 book Fighting Auschwitz.

== Reception ==
Poland's Chief Rabbi, Michael Schudrich, writes in the foreword: "When God created the human being, God had in mind that we should all be like Captain Witold Pilecki, of blessed memory" and about the book itself that it is "essential reading for anyone interested in the Holocaust." Historian Norman Davies writes in the introduction to the same translation: "If there was an Allied hero who deserved to be remembered and celebrated, this was a person with few peers."

In a review for The New York Times, Timothy Snyder writes that the book is "a historical document of the greatest importance [that] we are now so fortunate to have"; the book was also listed as one of the NYT Editor's Choices in June 2012. David de Sola in his review for The Atlantic notes that the book is "a fascinating first-hand account of virtually all aspects of life inside the camp". Vladislav Davidzon in the Tablet Magazine praised the book for providing a steely intelligence viewpoint rather than a memoiristic one, while still retaining sympathy and compassion for the Roma and Jews. Michał Kasprzak writing for the Cosmopolitan Review described the book as a "superbly translated ... rich narrative of courage and survival". John Besemeres praised the translator of the diary, and notes that the "content is fascinating at a number of levels". Reviewing the book for The Sarmatian Review, James E. Reid noted that the diary, "published without any noticeable editing", covers a period of about four years, "from the day [Pilecki] volunteered for Auschwitz in 1940 until shortly after his escape from the camp in 1943". The book was also reviewed by Bartosz Kaczorowski for Historia y Política. Kaczorowski praises the clarity of Pilecki's observations of the camp and the sadistic German torture within, as well as Pilecki's stoic humor even when reporting on terrible events. Daniel Ford wrote for the Michigan War Studies Review that it is a "remarkable memoir" complemented by "excellent maps and photographs".

In 2016 The Wall Street Journal listed the book as one of 'Five Best' books on wartime secret missions.

The book was adapted into a multimedia stage drama in entitled The Auschwitz Volunteer: Captain Witold Pilecki and performed in Broadway in New York City in 2018.

== See also ==
- Pilecki's Report
