= Jewish Legion (disambiguation) =

The Jewish Legion (1917–1919) was the battalions of the Royal Fusiliers of the British Army that fought in World War I .

Jewish Legion may also refer to:

- The Jewish Cavalry Regiment (1792–1794), commanded by Berek Joselewicz participated in the Kościuszko Uprising in Poland
- The Jewish Brigade (1940–1946), part of the British Army in World War II
- The Jewish Legion (Anders Army) (1941-1942) was a proposed unit in the Polish Anders Army in USSR during World War II
