= Michael Alfred Peszke =

American historian (1932–2015)

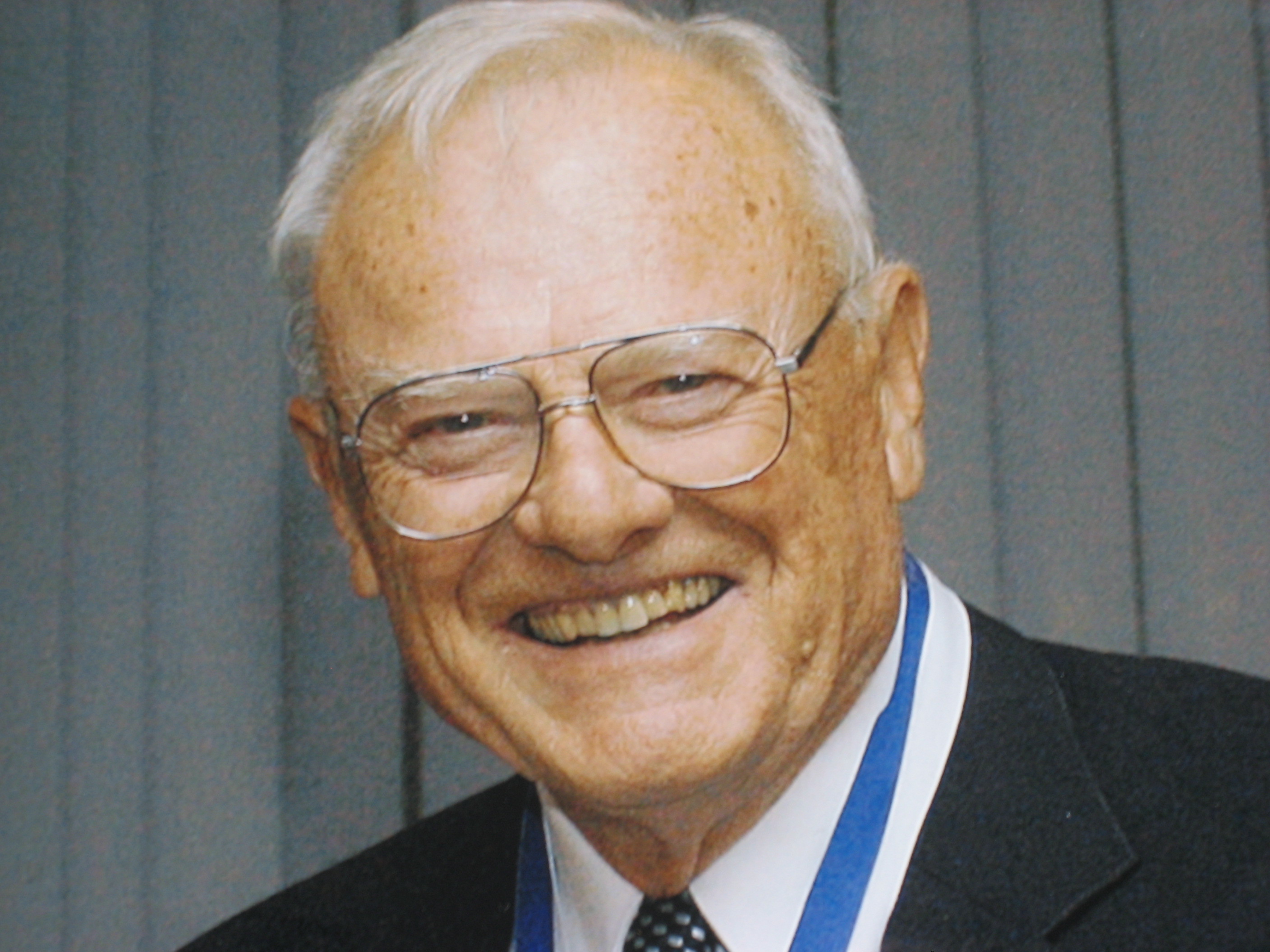
Michael Alfred Peszke

Michael Alfred Peszke (19 December 1932 – 17 May 2015) was a Polish-American psychiatrist and historian of the Polish Armed Forces in World War II.

== Life ==
Peszke was born in Dęblin, Poland, in 1932. After the outbreak of World War II and the Nazi and Soviet invasion of Poland, Peszke, his mother Eugenia Halina Grębocka Peszke, and his father Alfred Bartłomiej Peszke evacuated to France and Britain.

After attending school in Scotland and England, Michael Alfred Peszke studied at Trinity College Dublin, where he received his medical degree. From 1956 to 1960 he performed a psychiatric residency in Rhode Island and Connecticut in the United States, and in 1963 obtained his board certification. Until his retirement in 1999, he combined clinical work with research, teaching, and administrative duties, chiefly on the East Coast of the United States.

Peszke died at his home in Wakefield, Rhode Island, on 17 May 2015.

Peszke was professor emeritus of the University of Connecticut School of Medicine, Member Emeritus of the American College of Psychiatrists, and Distinguished Life Fellow of the American Psychiatric Association. He was a member of the Polish Institute of Arts and Sciences of America.

== History ==
Through his father, a Polish Air Force officer who in 1944 had become head of Air Force planning as part of the Staff of the Polish Commander-in-Chief in London, Peszke the son had developed an interest in the history of Polish Armed Forces policy and collaboration with the Allies. This led him to combine his psychiatric vocation with a historical avocation. Beginning in 1973, he published numerous papers and studies in English and Polish on diverse aspects of the Polish Armed Forces, particularly in the west, during World War II. Chief among these, are four books:

- Battle for Warsaw, 1939-1944, Boulder, Colorado, East European Monographs, distributed by Columbia University Press, 1995, 325 pp., ISBN 0-88033-324-3. A study of the military and diplomatic efforts of the Polish Government in Exile in France and Britain to restore Poland's sovereignty. The endeavor ended in tragedy when the Polish Home Army launched the Warsaw Uprising (August–October 1944) against the occupying German forces, the Soviet Union denied landing rights on Soviet-controlled territory to the Royal Air Force, the U.S. Army Air Corps, and the Polish Air Force headquartered in Britain, and the western Allies—fearing to offend the Soviets—declined to pressure Joseph Stalin to assist the Polish insurgents or at least grant landing rights. The Polish Parachute Brigade, which had been formed expressly to aid a prospective uprising in Poland, was—against Polish government and military objections—highjacked for British Field Marshal Bernard Law Montgomery's disastrous Operation Market Garden of A Bridge Too Far infamy just as the Warsaw Uprising was running its disastrous course.
- Poland's Navy, 1918-1945, New York, Hippocrene Books, 1999, 222 pp., ISBN 0-7818-0672-0. A history, unique in the English language, of the Polish Navy before and during World War II, containing entirely original sections on the Polish feluccas and Polish naval aviation.
- The Polish Underground Army, the Western Allies, and the Failure of Strategic Unity in World War II, foreword by Piotr S. Wandycz, Jefferson, North Carolina, McFarland & Company, 2005, 244 pp., ISBN 0-7864-2009-X. A ground-breaking, densely documented study of Polish military staff efforts in World War II, with special reference to Poland's relations with her allies.
- The Armed Forces of Poland in the West, 1939–46: Strategic Concepts, Planning, Limited Success but No Victory!, Solihull, Helion, 2013, ISBN 978-1908916549.
- Polskie siły zbrojne na Zachodzie, 1939–1946: Koncepcje strategiczne i realia geopolityki (The Polish Armed Forces in the West, 1939–1946: Strategic Concepts and Geopolitical Realities), translated by Tomasz Fiedorek, Poznań, Dom Wydawniczy Rebis, 2014, ISBN 978-83-7818-547-5. (This is a Polish-language edition of Peszke's 2013 book.)

Peszke's writings were characterized by a clarity and succinctness that may perhaps owe something to his training in medical diagnostics. In addition to documenting Poland's contributions to the Allied military effort in World War II—one of which, decryption of German Enigma machine ciphers, was acknowledged by Winston Churchill as having been critical to the outcome of the war—Peszke's historical writings show particular strength in regard to the delicate wartime politics and diplomacy of a country tragically trapped between the aggressive imperialisms of western and eastern Europe, a country betrayed by her own wartime European and American allies.

== Bibliography ==
- Battle for Warsaw, 1939-1944, Boulder, Colorado, East European Monographs, distributed by Columbia University Press, 1995, 325 pp., ISBN 0-88033-324-3.
- Poland's Navy, 1918-1945, New York, Hippocrene Books, 1999, 222 pp., ISBN 0-7818-0672-0.
- The Polish Underground Army, the Western Allies, and the Failure of Strategic Unity in World War II, foreword by Piotr S. Wandycz, Jefferson, North Carolina, McFarland & Company, 2005, 244 pp., ISBN 0-7864-2009-X.
- "The Demise of the Polish Armed Forces in the West, 1945–1947," The Polish Review, vol. LV, no. 2, 2010, pp. 231–39.
- Review of Arkady Fiedler, 303 Squadron: The Legendary Battle of Britain Squadron, translated by Jarek Garliński, Los Angeles, Aquila Polonica, 2010, ISBN 978-1-60772-004-1, in The Polish Review, vol. LV, no. 4, 2010, pp. 467–68.
- Michael Alfred Peszke, "The British-Polish Agreement of August 1940: Its Antecedents, Significance and Consequences," Journal of Slavic Military Studies (print: ISSN 1351-8046; online: ISSN 1556-3006), Taylor & Francis Group, no. 24, 2011, pp. 648–58.
- The Armed Forces of Poland in the West, 1939–46: Strategic Concepts, Planning, Limited Success but No Victory!, Helion Studies in Military History, no. 13, Solihull, England, Helion & Company, Ltd, 2013, ISBN 978-1-90891-654-9.

== See also ==
- List of Poles
- Polish Armed Forces in the West
- Polish contribution to World War II
- Polish government-in-exile
