= Józef Feldman =

Polish historian

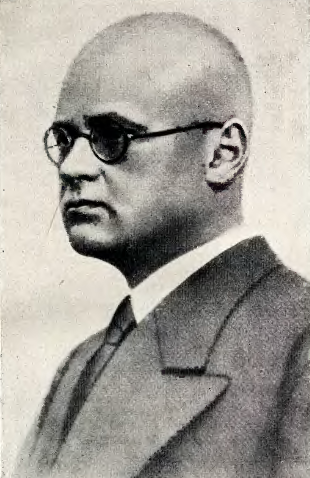
- Born: August 1, 1899; Przemyśl, Galicia, Austria-Hungary (now Poland)
- Died: June 16, 1946 (aged 46); Kraków, Poland
- Other name: Józef Sokołowski
- Occupation: Historian

Józef Feldman (wartime pseudonym: Józef Sokołowski; born on 1 August 1899 in Przemyśl, died on 16 June 1946 in Kraków) was a Polish historian of Jewish ethnicity, professor of the Jagiellonian University in Kraków and a member of the Polish Academy of Learning.

== Life and career ==
=== 1917–1939 ===
He was the son of Wilhelm Feldman, a writer, playwright, literary critic and historian, and Maria Kleinman, a translator of Western literature. His family was of Polish Jewish ethnicity. He graduated from secondary school (Gimnazjum no 4) in Kraków in 1917, then studied law (1917–1919) and history (1919–1922) in the Jagiellonian University, among others under the direction of Władysław Konopczyński and Stanisław Kot. During 1918-1920 he served as a volunteer in the Polish Army.

In 1922 he was appointed assistant in the Seminar of History of the Jagiellonian University, in 1923 he defended his doctor thesis Polska w dobie wielkiej wojny północnej 1704-1709" [Poland in the Time of the Great Northern War 1704-1709] elaborated under the supervision of Stanisław Kot. In 1927 he passed examination for post-doctoral degree (Note: Polish: habilitacja) based on his study Polska a sprawa wschodnia 1709-1714 [Poland and the Eastern Question 1709-1714] and became senior reader (Note: Polish: docent) in the Department of Universal History of the Jagiellonian University. (Note: Polish: Katedra Historii Powszechnej)

Since 1937 he was associate professor, and at the same time took over the management of the Department of Modern History of the Jagiellonian University and was the chief thereof until the outbreak of World War II and since the end of the war. He lectured the universal history and the diplomatic history of the 19th century and 20th century; since 1929 he additionally lectured the same subjects at the School of Political Sciences (Note: Polish: Szkoła Nauk Politycznych) in Kraków. He was a visiting lecturer in Paris, was involved in the activities of the International Congress of Historical Sciences in Warsaw in 1933 as well as in Zurich in 1938, was one of the initiators of the International Institute of the History of the French Revolution in Paris.

His friends included historians Władysław Konopczyński, Stanisław Kot, Marian Kukiel, Stanisław Kutrzeba as well as foreign scholars.

=== 1939–1945 ===
During World War II he was wanted by the Gestapo because of his pre-war scholarly researches of German-Polish relations, which criticized German policy towards Poland. Some time he worked as archivist in the Ossolineum in Lviv, then he went into hiding in the Franciscan monastery in Hanaczów near Lviv. Then he moved to Warsaw. He took part in the underground education (he lectured in the then underground University of Warsaw and in the Warsaw Pedagogic School). War experience accompanied by studies upon Christian philosophy made him a deeply believing catholic. During the Warsaw Uprising in 1944, unfit for military service because of his heart disease and myopia, he served in the ranks of the monastery in Kalwaria Zebrzydowska.

=== 1945–1946 ===
In 1945 he returned to his post at the Jagiellonian University, in the same year he became a corresponding member of the Polish Academy of Learning. (Note: Polish: Polska Akademia Umiejętności, in short "PAU") In 1946 became a member of the Polish Historical Society. (Note: Polish: Polskie Towarzystwo Historyczne) He died in 1946.

== Historical research ==
=== Fields of interest ===
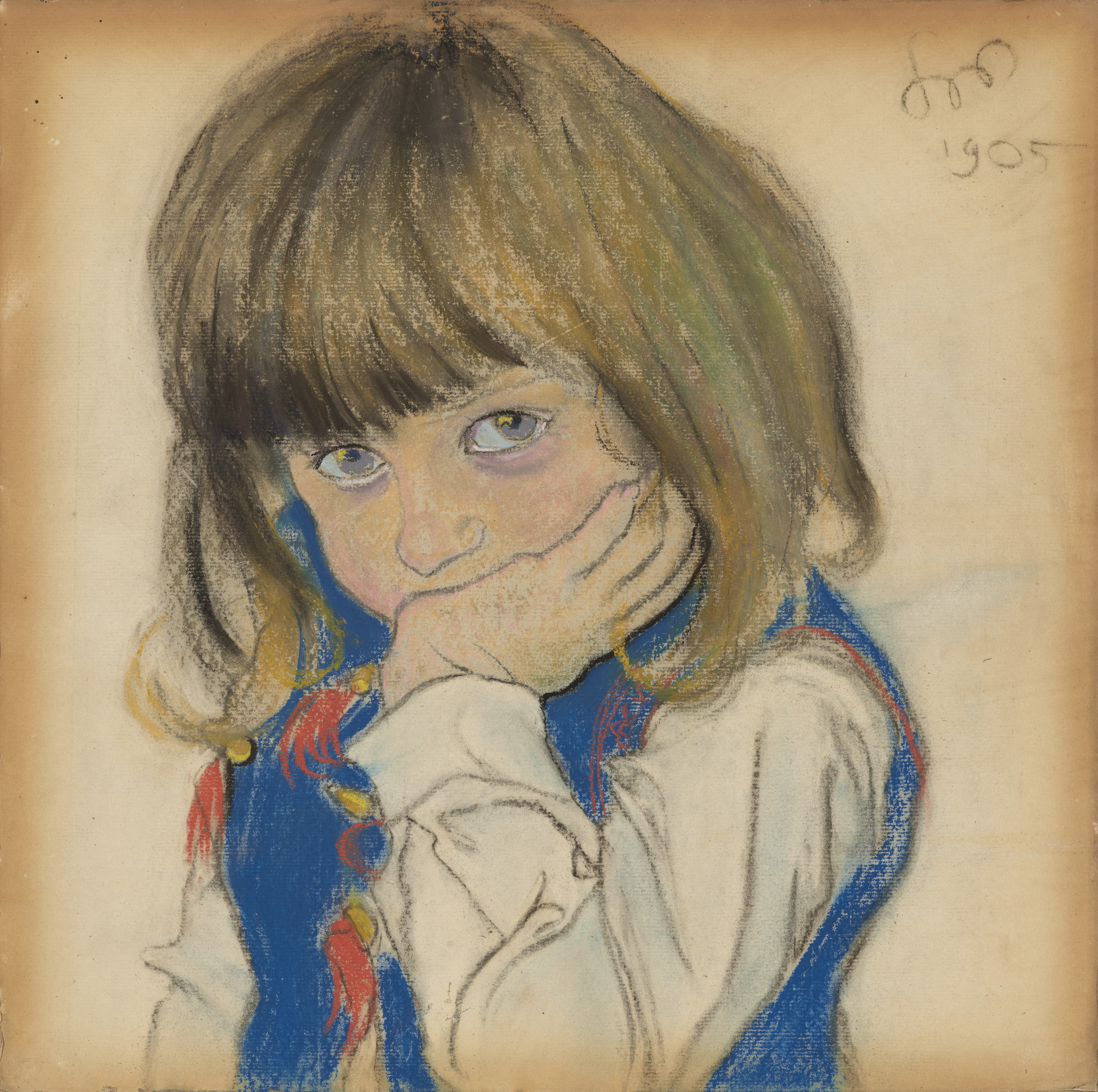
Five-year-old Józef Feldman as painted by Stanisław Wyspiański in 1905

His main areas of study included:

- history of Polish-German relations,
- international diplomatic history,
- history of Poland and France in the 18th century.

Most valued and republished part of his production includes researches on German-Polish relations and the times of Augustus II the Strong.

=== German-Polish relations ===
He paid much attention to the policy of Otto von Bismarck towards Poles; after a series of partial studies he published a monograph Bismarck a Polska [Bismarck and Poland] (1938, then republished in 1947, 1966 and 1980), in which he gave a comprehensive and critical analysis of Bismarck's policy regarding Polish question; the monograph was also of political importance as it influenced public opinion by an exposure of historical sources and continuity of the anti-Polish policy of Germany. During World War II the book was prohibited and hunted down by German occupation authorities.

=== Times of Augustus II the Strong and the Great Northern War ===
He was a pioneer (after his predecessor Kazimierz Jarochowski) of scholarly research of the history of Poland in time of the Great Northern War during the reign of Augustus II the Strong. He published a series of monographs: Polska w dobie wielkiej wojny północnej 1704-1709 [Poland in the Time of the Great Northern War 1704-1709] (1925) continued in Polska a sprawa wschodnia 1709-1714 [Poland and the Eastern Question 1709-1714] (1926) and Geneza Konfederacji Tarnogrodzkiej [The Origins of the Tarnogród Confederation] published in "Kwartalnik Historyczny" (1928), and a monograph of king Stanisław Leszczyński (1948, republished in 1959 and 1984). Feldman was the author of the statement, that the period of the Wettin dynasty in Poland was featured not only by a decline of the country, but it was also the beginning of progressive thought and inner rebirth of the nation. The new tendency can be traced in the Tarnogór Confederation.

=== Other research ===
In his work Sprawa polska w roku 1848 [The Polish Question in 1848] (1933) he presented an outline of Prussian and Russian policy towards the situation on lands of partitioned Poland during the Revolutions of 1848.

Józef Feldman researched the scholarly production of Michał Bobrzyński, Szymon Askenazy and Wacław Tokarz. He was an editor of the Cambridge History of Poland (1941) and prepared a new revised edition of his father's, Wilhelm Feldman, classical monograph Dzieje polskiej myśli politycznej 1864-1914 [History of the Polish Political Thought 1864-1914] (1933, reprinted in 1992).

== List of publications ==
Józef Feldman published over 160 studies, including:

- Polska a Prusy [Poland and Prussia] (1924)
- Sprawa dysydencka za Augusta II [The Dissident Question in the Time of Augustus II the Strong] (1924)
- Polska w dobie wielkiej wojny północnej 1704-1709 [Poland in the Time of the Great Northern War 1704-1709] (1925)
- Polska a sprawa wschodnia 1709-1714 [Poland and the Eastern Question 1709-1714] (1926)
- Geneza Konfederacji Tarnogrodzkiej [The Origins of the Tarnogród Confederation] published in "Kwartalnik Historyczny" (1928)
- Czasy saskie [a selection of historical sources of the times of Wettin dynasty in Poland, published in the series "Biblioteka Narodowa" by Ossolineum publishers] (1928)
- Bismarck a Komisja Osadnicza [Bismarck and the Settlement Commission] (1928)
- Mocarstwa wobec powstania styczniowego [The Powers Towards the January Uprising] (1929)
- Traktat wersalski jako etap zmagań polsko-niemieckich [The Treaty of Versailles as a Stage in the Polish-German Struggle] (1930)
- Bismarck wobec Kościoła katolickiego [Bismarck Towards the Catholic Church] (1932)
- U podstaw stosunków polsko-angielskich 1788-1863 [The Origins of Polish-English Relations] (1933, in: "Polityka narodów")
- Antagonizm polsko-niemiecki w dziejach [Polish-German Antagonism in History] (1934)
- Kraków i ziemia krakowska [Kraków and the Kraków Land] (1934, together with Roman Grodecki and Kazimierz Lepszy)
- Stanisław Leszczyński (1934)
- Na przełomie stosunków polsko-francuskich 1774-1787, Vergennes wobec Polski [On a Turn of Polish-French Relations 1774-1787, Vergennes Towards Poland] (1935)
- Nowsze kierunki badań nad Wielką Rewolucją [Newer Trends in Researches of the Great French Revolution] (1935)
- Rewolucja francuska a Europa [The French Revolution and Europe] (1936, in: Wielka historia powszechna)
- Dwa wizerunki cesarskich Niemiec [Two Faces of the Imperial Germany] (1937)
- Bismarck a Polska [Bismarck and Poland] (1938, 1947, 1966, 1980)
- Udział Polski w badaniach nad historią nowożytną [Poland's Participation in Researches on Modern History] (1937)
- Rozkład kultury mieszczańskiej [Decay of Middle-Class Culture] (1946)
- Stanisław Leszczyński (1948, 1959, 1984)

== See also ==
- List of Poles (History)
