= Władysław Konopczyński =

Polish historian (1880–1952)

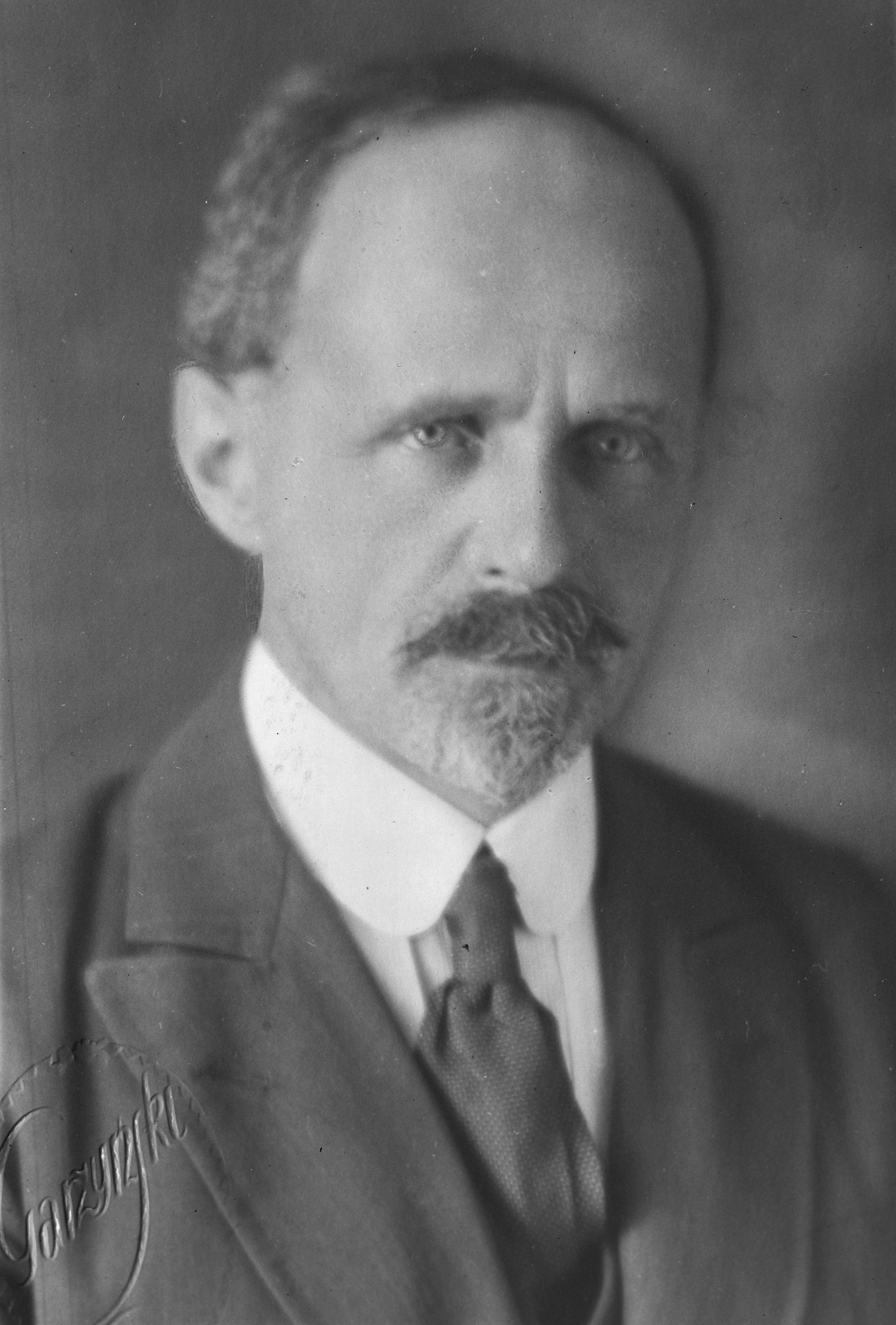
- Born: 26 November 1880; Warsaw, Congress Poland, Russian Empire
- Died: 12 July 1952 (aged 71)
- Education: University of Warsaw
- Occupations: historian, Member of Parliament
- Honours: Medal Virtus et Fraternitas Legion of Honour

Władysław Konopczyński (26 November 1880 – 12 July 1952) was a leading Polish historian and publisher of primary-source materials.

== Life ==
Władysław Konopczyński was born on 26 November 1880 in Warsaw, and was the son of Ignacy and Ludwika nee Obrąpalska. He was baptised as Władysław Aleksander. His godparents were Zofia Strumiłło and Aleksander Konopczyński. He spent his childhood in Łódź and Radom. In the years 1889-1891, together with his brother Zygmunt, he attended the Wojciech Górski Real School in Warsaw. In 1891 he moved to the 4th philological secondary school in Warsaw. From the sixth grade, he belonged to a secret self-education circle, where he was a librarian, lecturer and examiner on Polish history. In 1899 he passed his secondary school leaving certificate with very good results and a silver medal. He began his studies at the Faculty of Law of the Russian University of Warsaw.

In 1904 he graduated, obtaining the degree in legal and political sciences on the basis of the thesis entitled Przyczynki do spraw pochodzenia liberum veto [Contributions to the issue of the origin of the liberum veto]. Earlier, between 1903 and 1904, he spent one year's military service in the 3rd artillery brigade of the guard. After the outbreak of the Russian-Japanese war, not wanting to go to the Manchurian front, he simulated a disease, thanks to which he avoided being sent. He started to compose a book entitled Polska w dobie wojny siedmioletniej [Poland during the Seven Years' War].

In 1903, on the initiative of Tadeusz Korzon, he met the founder of Lviv's history school, Szymon Askenazy. After an initial conversation Askenazy, suggested to Konopczyński to prepare a dissertation on modern history. The young historian chose the 18th century, the twilight of the reign of August III Sas. In 1904, he went through the manuscripts in the Dzieduszycki, Ossoliński, Pawlikowski and Baworowski Libraries in Lwow and then set off for Vienna. From there, he went to Dresden, where he conducted a source search. The next stage of his search were the manuscripts of the French National Library and Polish Library in Paris as well as the Library of the British Museum in London. In 1904, he completed his two-month-long research voyages at the royal archive in Copenhagen.

In 1906 Konopczyński returned to Warsaw. He arrived after the revolutionary riots and started working as a history teacher at the school of his paternal uncle Emilian Konopczynski. Thanks to Tadeusz Korzon, he also taught at the newly established Society of Scientific Courses.

In autumn 1907, he left for Lwow, where - apart from participating in Askenazy's seminar - he attended lectures by historians Ludwik Finkel and Bronisław Dembiński, philologist Józef Kallembach and philosopher Kazimierz Twardowski. He had no problems with the commencement of his doctoral dissertation in spring 1908, as he was already the author of four serious historical treatises. After a year of hard work, he completed his doctorate. It was the first part of the work Poland during the Seven Years' War published by Szymon Askenazy in the series Monographs on Modern History. The dissertation was positively reviewed by Bronisław Dembiński and Ludwik Finkel, and the author passed the exams in common history, Polish history and philosophy with great success. The doctoral promotion took place on 16 November 1908 at the Francis I University in Lwow.

Immediately after his doctoral degree was awarded, Konopczyński left for Kraków, where he started to apply for his tenure. In January 1911, he started his postdoctoral degree on the basis of the second part of the book Poland during the Seven Years' War and numerous earlier articles and studies. On 27 April 1911, the post-doctorate colloquium was held. The professors Wacław Tokarz and Wacław Sobieski were the reviewers of the dissertation. The habilitation lecture was held on 29 April 1911 and was entitled: England in the face of the fall of Poland before the first partition. The young historian delighted the audience with his erudition, knowledge of sources and professionalism. The resolution of the Council of the Faculty of Philosophy of 26 May 1911 to award Konopczyński veniam legendi in the field of modern history was approved on 2 August 1911 by the Ministry of Confessions and Education of Austro-Hungary.

Since 1911 Konopczyński, as a private associate professor joined the Jagiellonian University. His most important task was to collect materials for the works he already started and planned. Between 1912 and 1913, apart from Polish archives, he visited London, St. Petersburg, Stockholm, Copenhagen, Berlin, Dresden, Marburg, Paris, Munich, Vienna, Moscow and Kiev. He considered the monumental Konfederacja Barska [Bar Confederation] as opus magnum of his search, the book that was published 25 years later and treated as a work of his life.

When the World War I broke out, Konopczyński was in Gdynia, from where he was expelled to Sweden. During the deportation, the Professor forgot to take his personal belongings, but he was still carrying a suitcase filled with materials to the Bar Confederation. He stayed in Scandinavia for about a year and a half, but devoted most of his time to archival research, which later resulted in a scientific dissertation on Polish-Swedish and Polish-Danish relations. He returned to Krakow in February 1916.

In January 1917 the possibility of employment at the Jagiellonian University opened for Konopczyński. First, he competed for the job with Wacław Tokarz, and later with Oskar Halecki, Ludwik Kolankowski and Stanisław Zakrzewski. On 10 July 1917, after a stormy discussion at a meeting of the Council of the Faculty of Philosophy, it was decided to employ Konopczyński.

He was a polyglot who knew 14 languages.

Apart from teaching, Konopczyński was passionate about scientific work. In his huge historical writing legacy, the main work (written in the interwar period and prepared for 25 years) was the already mentioned Bar Confederation (vol. 1-2, 1936-1938). Many smaller works and source publications were created along with this monumental monograph, including the diaries of Wojciech Mączeński (1911), Teofila Sapieżyna nee Jabłonowska (1914) and Stanisław Lubomirski (1925), and compendia of sources: Polityka i ustrój Generalności Konfederacji Barskiej (1928), Materiały do dziejów wojny konfederackej 1768-1774 (1931), Konfederacja barska. Selection of texts (1928). Moreover, the article published in the Historical Quarterly entitled Przegląd źródeł do Konfederacji Barskiej (1934) still remains useful. An excellent biography of the confederate chief Kazimierz Pułaski (1931) was created in the process of the monograph, The biography was translated into English and published in the United States.

The other field Konopczyński's research was Polish foreign policy in the 17th and 18th centuries. In the period between the world wars he published: Poland and Sweden and Poland and Turkey. The legal and political were the issues raised in the Origins and establishment of the Constant Council (1917), very early and yet considered by many researchers to be Konopczyński's most mature work in the historical-legal field. To some extent the biography of Stanisław Konarski (1926) can be included in the same genre due to the role of political and political thought of the outstanding Piarist. The sketch History of English Parliamentarianism (1923) and the study Government and Parliament in the former Republic of Poland (1930) are still relevant. The historian collected more detailed political and political outlines in the volume From Sobieski to Kościuszko. Sketches, trinkets, historical trifles (1921).

While still an associate professor, Konopczyński tried to coordinate teamwork on the whole of Polish history. He devoted an extensive article to this cause, entitled "Dziejopisarstwo zbiorowe u obcych i u nas" (1916). However, the proposal, which was repeated several times, did not find wider resonance among historians. The scholar himself did not evade teamwork and participated in creating such syntheses as: Poland in Common Culture (1918), Wielkopolska [Great Poland] in the Past (1926), Pomerania and Chelmno Land (1927), Encyclopaedia of the Social Sciences (1933), Pologne Suisse (1938), Repertorium der diplomatischen Vertreter aller Länder (vol. II, 1936).

In 1924, he published four books of source texts for junior high school students: The Reign of Jan Kazimierz, The Saxon Times in Poland, Poland during the Turkish Wars and The Reign of Stanisław August Poniatowski. Apart from these minor works, together with Oskar Halecki, Waclaw Sobieski and Jozef Krajewski, he contributed to the creation of several major collective works, such as: Political history of Poland in the years 1648-1775 (1923). In 1938, he became involved in the largest undertaking of that time, namely the publication of the Great General History, in which he wrote the part that covered the times of absolutism 1648-1788. His last important work written before World War II was the History of Modern Poland (1936).

In 1931, he founded Polski słownik biograficzny (The Polish Biographical Dictionary) and served as its first editor, seeing seven volumes through press, 1935–1949, before being forced by Poland's postwar communist government to resign his editorship. Konopczyński's great merit lays in the initiation and commencement of the publication of the largest collective work of Polish inter-war historiography. In 1930, under the auspices of the Polish Academy of Arts and Sciences, a Temporary Editorial Committee was established with Konopczyński as its chairman. His intention was not to create a monograph, but to provide basic facts and a comprehensive source basis for a given person. That would allow a wide range of readers to delve into more detailed research. From 1934, Konopczyński, as the editor-in-chief, began to collect biographies for the first volume of the dictionary, which included entries for the letters A and B. He planned to produce 20,000 biographies in 20 volumes published over 20 years. Many of his former and contemporary students also contributed to this work, including Emanuel Rostworowski, Władysław Czapliński, Józef Feldman, and Józef Andrzej Gierowski.

He wrote histories of Poland and of the modern world. In his own time, he participated as a member of the Polish delegation at the Paris Peace Conference, 1919 and as a representative of Popular National Union in the Sejm between 1922 and 1927 during the Second Polish Republic. He argued for the recognition of the role of Roman Dmowski in the fight for Polish independence.

From his early youth, the historian showed great interest in politics and did not hide his all-Polish, i.e. nationalist, view of the world. While studying at the Russian University of Warsaw, he took part in the work of Brotherly Aid when the organisation was headed by young people connected with the Polish Youth Union "Zet". Although he did not formally join the Union, he took part in the meetings of this underground youth organisation, during which he gave lectures on Polish history. After his studies he devoted himself exclusively to scientific work. He returned to politics at the end of the First World War, as a strong supporter of National Democracy and an opponent of the Krakow activists. However, it was only at the end of 1917, after long hesitations and disputes with Franciszek Bujak, that he joined the secret National League, where he was a commissioner after Stefan Rowiński resigned, and then a member of the General Council, until its dissolution in 1927. In May 1918 Konopczyński was in Prague at the Slavic Congress. In November that year, on behalf of the Polish Liquidation Commission, he was seeking intervention in Lwow at the Belgrade headquarters of the Allies, as Lwow was at the time being besieged by the Ukrainians. During the conversation with General Paul Henry, he demanded the establishment of the Allied occupation of Lwow, Stanislawow, Stryj and Boryslaw. Despite their constructive discussion, the General did not agree to send French troops to Poland, citing the paucity of the forces and lack of communication with Lwow as the reasons. From February to June 1919, the scholar took part in a conference of the powers in Paris, as an expert for the Polish Bureau of Congress Work. He dealt with historical and legal issues and the preparation of publications of the Polish Committee. However, he was aware of the fact that the group of experts and advisors arriving in France in February 1919 did not have much influence on the territorial programme of the Polish delegation, as it had already been prepared by the activists of the Polish National Committee headed by Roman Dmowski. During the Polish-Bolshevik war, Konopczyński volunteered to join the army and was an instructor of the artillery of the common movement in the Krakow garrison.Two years earlier, on 8 October 1918, he became a member of the now openly operating Democratic and National Party.

As an eminent historian with an established reputation, and also as a publicist, Konopczyński cooperated with right-wing newspapers and magazines, such as: "The Year of Poland", "Voice of Nation", "Gazeta Polska", "Gazeta Warszawska", "Nationalist Idea", "Kurier Poznański", "Kurier Lwowski", "Kurier Warszawski" and "All-Poland Review". His personal acquaintance with Roman Dmowski, Marian Seyda, Stanisław Grabski, Stanisław Głąbiński, Stefan Dąbrowski, Stanisław Kozicki, Władysław Kucharski and Roman Rybarski was not insignificant for his growing political commitment. That was on top of his anti-German and national beliefs inbred at the university. He visited Dmowski in Warsaw and Chludow many times, where they discussed political, historical and social issues. On 5 November 1922 Konopczyński became an MP – as a member of the Christian Union of National Unity, after Korfanty had relinquished his Krakow mandate. Alongside him, Henryk Mianowski, candidate of the Christian Democrats, also entered the Sejm. On 17 November, after all the votes were counted, at a meeting of the Electoral Committee, Stanisław Rymar officially welcomed him as an MP. Following his election, Konopczyński joined the parliamentary club of the People' National Association and became president of the Krakow circle. The scholar was aware of the fact that by not being one of the party authorities, he would have little influence on the parliamentary strategy. Nevertheless, during his term in office, he managed to carry out several significant educational acts: on copyright law, on the transfer of the former building of the National Sejm to the Jan Kazimierz University in Lwow and on political associations. He worked with others on many other acts, such as scholarships for students.

On 1 December 1922 a solemn session of the Sejm was held, during which the nationalists together with the peasants' party representatives elected Maciej Rataj as Speaker of the Sejm, and Wojciech Trąmpczyński as Speaker of the Senate. This alliance did not last long, however, as already on 9 December, during the election of the President of the Republic of Poland held at the National Assembly, the people's activists voted in favour of Gabriel Narutowicz, and not Maurice Zamojski, supported by the National Democrats. Konopczyński was shocked and bewildered by their disloyalty and the election of Narutowicz. In a matter of days, the situation in the capital was becoming more and more tense, and old nationalist activists could not control a young wing who by fair means or foul used smear campaign against the newly elected president, ultimately leading to his murder. The act of Eligiusz Niewiadomski deeply moved Konopczyński, he considered him to be a madman, and described the murder as a 'December disaster'.

In the later period, the historian was one of the most ardent supporters of the agreement with the Piast club. When active in the Sejm for five years (1922-1927), Konopczyński sat on the Educational and Constitutional Committees, and occasionally on the Regulations, Administrative, Military, Legal and Foreign Affairs Committees. He was a speaker on issues of academic education, copyright law, the Act on Freedom of Assembly. He went down in history, however, primarily as a speaker on the application for a numerus clausus for national minorities.

This issue was already discussed at the 'Professor's Teas' before the elections. The decision to introduce an application for a numerus clausus into the Sejm was made at the meeting of the People's National Association Club on 14 December 1922. At that time, a committee was made up of: Emil Godlewski, Fr Kazimierz Lutosławski, Jan Zamorski, Zofia Sokolnicka and Władysław Konopczyński - 'to lay down a bill securing the percentage of Poles in higher education institutions'. Jadwiga Konopczyńska was opposed to her husband's participation in the work of this committee, as she rightly believed that this could harm his university career. Nevertheless, the scholar, not wishing to infringe on party discipline, agreed to refer the proposal on numerus clausus. Discrimination against students of Jewish origin did not bring pride to Konopczyński, whom his own faculty cut off. The battle for numerus clausus ended in a fiasco in the light of the opposition from the majority of scientists. It was the result of a nationwide discussion on the participation of the Jewish population in university life, with clear anti-Semitic tendencies emerging during the discussion.

The conflict with Józef Piłsudski and his supporters was also important part in Konopczyński's political activity. The dispute began in 1925, when the Marshal accused the Military Historical Bureau of the General Staff, headed by General Marian Kukiel, of falsifying documents relating to the 1920 war. On the initiative of the Minister of National Defence, General Sikorski, Konopczyński together with Wacław Tokarz, Bronisław Gembarzewski, Stanisław Zakrzewski and General Leonard Skierski, was appointed to a committee to investigate the merits of the charges. In a separate brochure, Konopczyński argued that the Marshal's accusations were groundless, thus minimising his participation in the Polish-Soviet War. The professor's speech gained publicity in the press and made him enemies in Piłsudski's circles, as the Marshal did not accept the committee's verdict and did not stop in attacks on the Military Historical Bureau.

On lawlessness, as he assessed the Marshal's actions to be, he replied with a series of press articles. Before the coup, he appeared against Piłsudski in the 1925 'Kurier Warszawski', comparing his role to that of a degenerate 18th-century hetman. For Konopczyński, the May Coup meant the outbreak of civil war, a violation of the principles of Polish parliamentarianism and the introduction of dictatorship. In accordance with the entire nationalist camp, he insisted on 'the unbendable rule of law' so he rejected and condemned Piłsudski's authoritarian tendencies. In the often confiscated 'Tribune of the Nation', Konopczyński made attempts to diminish Piłsudski's role during the struggle for Poland's regaining of independence. He characterised the Marshal as a pro-German politician, who in autumn 1918 represented a small group of civilians and military men of socialist tinge. For these reasons, he denied him the right to represent the entire Polish nation and monopolise power.

In 'Głos Narodu' (The Voice of the Nation) from 1926, he compared Piłsudski's May Coup with the fatal rebellions of Mikołaj Zebrzydowski and Jerzy Sebastian Lubomirski. Poland paid for the first one with the loss of Inflanty (Duchy of Livonia) and Estonia, Lubomirski's action cost the country Kiev and Smolensk. The consequences of the Marshal May coup were not predicted by Konopczyński. In another article published in "Gazeta Warszawska" in 1926 he claimed that the May occupation of Warsaw by Piłsudski's rebellious armies did show many analogies with the occupation of the capital by the partitioning army in 1773. He also argued that the coup took place at a time when the government and the Sejm were emerging from the crisis, and he called the Commander a usurper, who calls the illegal seizure of power a reform. Konopczyński also tried - unsuccessfully - to organise protests at universities against the destruction of the country's legal basis. However, these actions did not happen. The professor criticised the intelligentsia, believing that at a decisive moment in history, it betrayed its social expectations and her attitude was characterised by fear, softness and readiness to give up defending national interests.

The outbreak of World War II was a turning point in the life of Konopczyński and his family. On 6 November 1939, as a result of Sonderaktion Krakau, the scientist was arrested, then held in a Nazi prison in Wrocław, and eventually in the Sachsenhausen concentration camp. concentration camp. After his release from the camp, Konopczyński became involved in secret teaching at the Jagiellonian University. Thanks to Mieczysław Małecki, from November 1942 he took charge of historical studies.

In Konopczyński's research work from the occupation period, three basic trends can be distinguished. The first one includes research into the times of the interwar period, the second is a continuation of research into the 18th century, and the third one is closely related to the painful contemporary events, devoted to the issues of Polish-German relations. In the years 1940-1941, with the aid of the regained private library, interviews with people taking an active part in the political life of the Sanacja (Reform), a set of nationalist newspapers, a selection of Marshal's writings, transcripts and Sejm prints, he prepared a two-volume work entitled Piłsudski and Poland. The book of 500 pages of text remains in typescript to this day.

Works concerning the 18th century include the monograph entitled The First Partition of Poland, which complements two earlier works by the scholar - the Bar Confederation and Genesis and the establishment of the Permanent Council. The times of Stanisław August's reign and the participation of Polish women in the Bar Confederation were a subject of a popular science book entitled When We Were governed by Women; due to the 'censored' name of the author published as late as in 1960 in London.

The third stream was represented by the works: Fryderyk the Great and Poland (1947) and The Baltic Question until the 20th century (1947). The first one of these, written with expressive passion and loaded with clear emotion, despite the lack of footnotes, presents great scientific value and is still an irreplaceable item. Konopczyński had been preparing the monograph on the Baltic Issue for many years. In writing and supplementing this work in the inter-war period, and then during the war, the author was thinking about Poland's extensive return to the Baltic Sea.

At the same time, he created many smaller studies, among others: A brief outline of Poland's history, Confederation in historical development, History of Inflanty and Poland at the time of the First Partition. Among the works that extend the scientific infrastructure, one should mention the Chronology of Polish Sejms (1948) and a textbook on methodology called History. During the war, he also put his diary in order, diary - which was written for 57 years and covered about 7,000 pages; it was supposed to form the basis for his future autobiography.

After the war, he was removed from all his academic and scholarly posts by Poland's communist government. After the Red Army entered Krakow, Konopczyński returned to work at the Jagiellonian University. For the next three years he examined students, gave monographic lectures and seminars. He also did not resign from cooperation with the secret Nationalist Party. Under a pseudonym he wrote polemical articles to the secret nationalist newspaper "Walka [Struggle]" Luckily for him he avoided arrest, but he was under surveillance by the security authorities.

Despite holding the most important functions in the historical environment, his position was weakened not only because of his independence of opinion, but also because of the personal aversion of the Minister of Education, Stanisław Skrzeszewski. Konopczyński was horrified to see the totalitarian system spreading in Poland, against which he did not hide his contempt or criticism.

When he was urged to make concessions and humble himself in front of the communist dignitaries, during a scientific conference in the auditorium of the Jagiellonian University on 26 January 1946 he said: "One hears that the science is to serve life. Yes, let it serve where it can, let it guide it. But let it not be served'. These views and Konopczyński's true independence determined his position in the conflict with the authorities, who tried by all means to remove him from the Jagiellonian University, the Polish Academy of Arts and Sciences and the Polish Historical Society.

Since the spring of 1947, the smear against the historian began, describing him as a "zoological anti-Semite". The anti-Semitic problem was raised by Minister Skrzeszewski and was an excuse to remove the scientist from all the positions he held. In May, Konopczyński was forced to resign from the position of President of the PTH - as he noted, 'Skrzeszewski did not allow me in front of him and refused to provide the Association with any material assistance while the zoological anti-Semite was in charge. Every intelligent person knew this was absurd, but the core of the insult was hidden somewhere else: my words spoken at a scientific conference in the Jagiellonian University auditorium on 26 January 1946 were remembered in governmental spheres'. On the news of being accused of 'zoological anti-Semitism', Konopczyński had a massive heart attack on the night of 19–20 May 1947. This event was followed by further blows. On 31 October 1948 Deputy Minister of Education Eugenia Krassowska made him retire. She refused the appeal, ordering that his personal files be sent back to the State Pension Fund. Konopczyński was under the illusion that his successor at the cathedral would be Władysław Pociecha, the author of a monumental work about Queen Bona. It was with a great surprise that he found out Celina Bobinska being appointed.

The last lecture by Konopczyński was dedicated to the creator of the Krakow history school, Józef Szujski. The lecture hall was filled to the brim with students and pupils from whom he received flowers. At the end of the lecture, looking at the plaque commemorating Sonderaktion Krakau, he said: "But at the same time you must preserve the independence of spirit, the independence for which the Jagiellonian University professors in Sachsenhausen died, and you must seek the truth, strive for the truth. Do not believe that there is a class truth, there are only class sins for which you have to atone. And there is only one truth. They will tell you about the new method, about lux ex Oriente. Judge for yourselves the value of the to-date one, which has hundreds of thousands of volumes behind it and which supposedly is not history, and judge that Marxist historiography, which does not yet exist and which is yet to be'.

The culmination of the smear campaign against Konopczyński was the case of his removal from the post of editor-in-chief of the Polish biographical dictionary. Confidential talks of Minister Skrzeszewski with Jan Dąbrowski, who was unfavourable to Konopczyński, and the threat of withdrawal of the subsidy for the publishers led to a dramatic meeting between Chairman Kazimierz Nitsch, Adam Krzyżanowski and Konopczyński on 17 May 1949, after which he submitted a written resignation from the position of editor of the dictionary. He firmly stressed that he "resigned for [...] independent reasons, at the request of one of the political parties".

Konopczyński experienced the last few years of his life very painfully, seeking solace in prayer and meetings with his Dominican friend, Father Jacek Woroniecki. He was one of the few who, alongside Tadeusz Strumiłło, Jan Obrąpalski, Franciszek Bujak and Stanisław Michalski, often visited the professor, while the rest of his pupils and friends - caused by fear - moved away from him. The researcher's loneliness is well illustrated by the letters he wrote to his daughter Halina, who lived in England.

In the winter of 1951/1952, Konopczyński's health deteriorated significantly and the doctors did not give much chance of improvement. On 6 May 1952, after 160 days of lying in bed, he went out for his first walk, and from then on he went out every day. In July 1952 he decided that the Krakow air did not serve him well and, after consulting the doctor, Leon Tochowicz, left for Młynik. Konopczyński died of a heart attack, on the night of 12–13 July 1952 in Młynik, and was buried in the Salwator Cemetery in Krakow.

Konopczyński was a recipient of the French Légion d'honneur and Virtus et Fraternitas Medal.

== Works ==
His chief works included:

- Polska w dobie wojny siedmioletniej (Poland during the Seven Years' War, 1909–11);
- Liberum veto (1918);
- Dzieje Polski nowożytnej (History of Modern Poland, 2 vols., 1936);
- Konfederacja barska (The Bar Confederation, 1936–38);
- Kwestia bałtycka do XIX wieku (The Baltic Question to the 19th Century, 1947).
- Fryderyk Wielki a Polska (Frederick the Great and Poland) (1947, republished in 2010)
- Polska a Szwecja (Poland and Sweden) (1924)
- Polska a Turcja 1683-1792 (Poland and Turkey 1683-1792) (1936)
- Anglia a Polska w XVIII wieku (England and Poland in the 18th century) (1947)

== See also ==
- List of Poles
