= Józef Garliński =

Polish historian and writer (1913–2005)

- Born: 14 October 1913; Kiev, Russian Empire (now Kyiv, Ukraine)
- Died: 29 November 2005 (aged 92); London, England

Academic background
- Education: International London School of Economics and Political Science

Academic work
- Discipline: Polish history in WWII and its aftermath

Józef Garliński (14 October 1913 – 29 November 2005) was a Polish historian and prose writer. He was a survivor of Auschwitz concentration camp and wrote books on the history of World War II, some of which were translated into English. In particular, his book Fighting Auschwitz, translated into English in 1975, became a best-seller.

== Biography ==
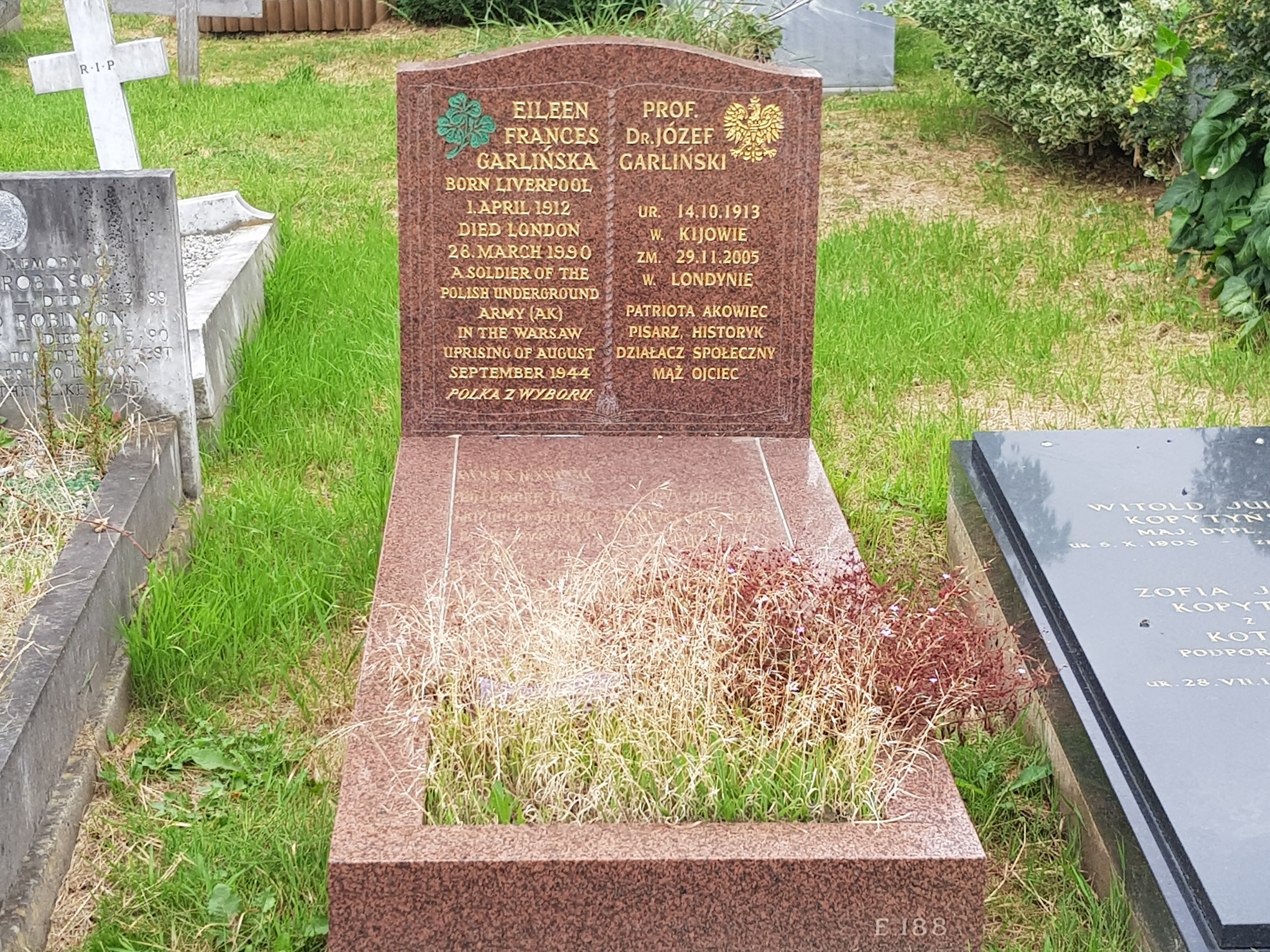
Grave of Eileen and Józef Garliński, Gunnersbury Cemetery, London

Garliński was born to LTC of the Polish Army and victim of the Katyn Massacre, Jarosław Garliński, and Wanda Garlińska née Szymańska in Kiev on 14 October 1913.

He studied at the Jesuit school Zakład Naukowo-Wychowawczy Ojców Jezuitów w Chyrowie. Garliński fought in the Polish Army during the Invasion of Poland of 1939 and subsequently joined Polish resistance becoming a member of the Armia Krajowa. He was arrested in April 1943 by the Germans and imprisoned in Pawiak prison, and later transferred to Auschwitz and then to Neuengamme concentration camps. Garliński arrived at the Auschwitz camp on 13 May 1943, and was given prisoner number 121421.

After the war Garliński settled in Great Britain. For a time he worked as an estate agent and an insurance salesman while researching and writing a number of books, many of them about Polish World War II history, such as Poland, SOE and the Allies (1969), particularly after his retirement when he completed doctoral studies in history at the International London School of Economics and Political Science. One of his best-known works was Fighting Auschwitz, first published in Polish in 1974 and translated into English in 1975. His other works include Hitler's Last Weapons (1978) about the German V-weapons, Intercept (1979) on the wartime intelligence services, The Swiss Corridor (1981) about espionage in wartime Switzerland, and the more general history, Poland in the Second World War (1985). In 1991 he published his wartime autobiography, The Triumph of Love.

He died in London on 29 November 2005.

== Works ==
Most of his works were not allowed to be published in communist Poland, and until the fall of communism, their Polish-language editions were published either abroad or in the Polish underground press.

Partial list of his works includes:

- Matki i Żony (1962)
- Ziemia (1964)
- Między Londynem i Warszawą (1966)
- Politycy i Żołnierze (1968, 1988, 1991)
- Poland, SOE and the Allies (1969)
- Polskie Państwo Podziemne 1939-1945 (1974)
- Oświęcim walczący (1974, 1992), translated into English as Fighting Auschwitz: the resistance movement in the concentration camp (1975 and numerous subsequent editions)
- Ostatnia broń Hitlera: V1 i V2 (1977), translated to English as Hitler's Last Weapons: the underground war against the V1 and V2 (1978)
- Dramat i opatrzność (1978)
- Intercept: the Enigma war (UK, 1979), also published under the title The Enigma War (US, Charles Scribner's Sons, 1980) and in Polish as Enigma. Tajemnica drugiej wojny światowej (1999)
- Szwajcarski korytarz (1981, 1987, 1989; English translation: The Swiss corridor: espionage networks in Switzerland during World War II)
- Polska w drugiej wojnie światowej (1982, 1988, 1991), translated into English as Poland in the Second World War (1985)
- W czterdziestą rocznicę. Agonia, walka i śmierć warszawskiego getta (1983)
- Niezapomniane lata. Dzieje Wywiadu Więziennego i Wydziału Bezpieczeństwa Komendy Głównej AK (1987)
- The Survival of Love. Memoirs of a Resistance Officer (1991)
- Świat mojej pamięci (vols. 1–2, 1992–98)

In 2018 the American publisher Aquila Polonica announced a plan to publish many of Garliński's works in English.
