= Józef Andrzej Gierowski =

Józef Andrzej Gierowski (1922-2006) was a Polish historian, professor and rector of the Jagiellonian University.

== Career ==
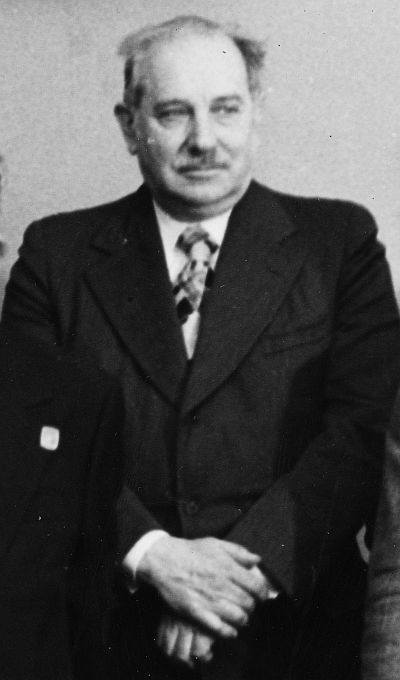
Józef Andrzej Gierowski

Soldier of Armia Krajowa during World War II. Member of the Polish Academy of Sciences, director of its Institute of History (1953-1968) and its Department of History of Silesia (1977-1981). Rector of the Jagiellonian University from 1981 to 1987. Member of the Polish Academy of Learning, from 1990 director of its Philosophical-Historical Sciences Division. Deputy in the Sejm of the People's Republic of Poland 1985-1989.

During the war Gierowski was a student in clandestine classes of the Jagiellonian University in Kraków. He studied under the mentorship of Władysław Konopczyński and graduated in 1946. In 1947 he was granted a doctoral degree at the University of Wrocław and assumed a faculty position there, working initially under the direction of Władysław Czapliński. In Wrocław Gierowski demonstrated his ability to combine scientific and didactic work with editorial, popularizing and increasingly, administrative duties.

In 1965 Gierowski moved to the Jagiellonian University and became full professor in 1970. Director of the University's Institute of History 1967-1972. Active in Solidarity. In 1981 Józef Gierowski was elected rector (university's chief executive) in the first, since 1968, free faculty election. During the martial law in Poland Gierowski intervened with the authorities and was able to obtain quick release of the interned students and employees of the University. In 1983 he was delegated to present the University's honorary doctorate to Pope John Paul II. In 1983 Gierowski received an honorary doctorate from the Faculty of Humanities at Uppsala University, Sweden. In 1984 Rector Gierowski initiated the project of building a new campus for the University. The undertaking, at that time viewed as unrealistic, was pursued and completed by Gierowski's successors.

In 1986 Gierowski established the first interdepartmental program in the history and culture of the Jews in Poland, which became the University's Department of Jewish Studies. In 1991-1995 Gierowski was a member of the Polish-Jewish relations council advising the President of Poland.

== Interests and publications ==
Józef Gierowski was the author of over 380 publications. His interests were related to the modern era history of Poland and Europe, history of the Jews in Poland, history of Silesia and history of the Catholic and other churches. Prof. Gierowski's work and activities stressed the multiethnic, multicultural and multidenominational aspects of Poland's modern era history, in an attempt to create a large-scale synthesis of historical processes involved. He had sustained a lifelong active commitment to the Silesian historical scene and cultivated his Wrocław connections. Gierowski's publications include:

- Między saskim absolutyzmem, a złotą wolnością (Between Saxon Absolutism and Golden Liberty), 1953
- Dzieje Wrocławia (History of Breslau, 1619-1740 portion), Historia Śląska (History of Silesia, vol. 1, part 3)
- W cieniu Ligi Północnej (In the Shadow of the Northern League), 1971
- Historia Polski (The History of Poland), vol. 2, 1505-1764 and vol. 3, 1764-1864 of the 4-volume history, 1978
- Historia Włoch (The History of Italy), 1981
- The Polish-Lithuanian Commonwealth. From Anarchy to Well-Organised State (Academia Scientiarum et Litterarum Polona; Dissertationes Facultatis Historico-Philosophicae, Bd. 82), Cracow 1996
- Rzeczpospolita w dobie złotej wolności (1648–1763) (The Commonwealth in the Era of Golden Liberty (1648-1763)), vol. 5 of the 10-volume Wielka historia Polski (The Great History of Poland), 2001
