= Polish Armed Forces in the West =

Polish military divisions which fought with the Allies on the Western Front of WWII

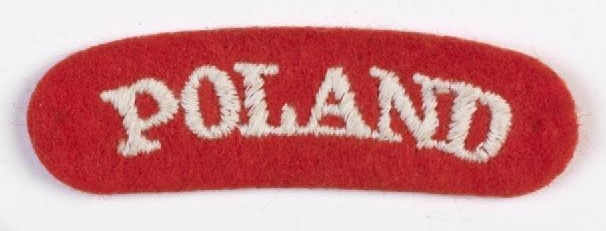
Shoulder sleeve insignia of the Polish Armed Forces in the West

The Polish Armed Forces in the West (Polish: Polskie Siły Zbrojne na Zachodzie) are the Polish military formations formed to fight alongside the Allies against Nazi Germany and the Axis powers during World War II. Polish forces were raised within Soviet Union territories; these were the Polish Armed Forces in the East.

The formations, loyal to the Polish government-in-exile, were first formed in France following the invasion of Poland in September 1939. After the Battle of France in June 1940, the formations were recreated in the United Kingdom. Making a large contribution to the war effort, the Polish Armed Forces in the West was composed of army, air and naval forces. The Poles became shock troops in Allied service, most notably in the Battle of Monte Cassino during the Italian Campaign, where the Polish flag was raised on the ruined abbey on 18 May 1944, as well as in the Battle of Bologna and the Battle of Ancona (both also in Italy), and Hill 262 in France in 1944. The Polish Armed Forces in the West were disbanded after the war, in 1947, with many former servicemen forced to remain in exile.

== General history ==
After the invasion of Poland in September–October 1939, the Polish government-in-exile organized in France a new fighting force originally of about 80,000 men. Their units were subordinate to the French Army. In early 1940, a Polish Independent Highland Brigade took part in the Battles of Narvik in Norway. A Polish Independent Carpathian Brigade was formed in the French Mandate of Syria, to which many Polish troops had escaped from Poland. The Polish Air Force in France comprised 86 aircraft in four squadrons; one-and-a-half of the squadrons were fully operational, while the rest were in various stages of training. Two Polish divisions (First Grenadier Division, and Second Infantry Fusiliers Division) took part in the Battle of France, while a Polish motorized brigade and two infantry divisions were being formed.

Polish Armed Forces in the West at the height of their power
Deserters from forced conscription in the German Wehrmacht	89,300	(35.1%)
Evacuees from the USSR in 1942	83,000	(32.6%)
Evacuees from France in 1940	35,000	(13.8%)
Liberated POWs	21,750	(8.5%)
Escapees from occupied Europe	14,210	(5.6%)
Recruits in liberated France	7,000	(2.8%)
Polish diaspora from Argentina, Brazil and Canada	2,290	(0.9%)
Polish diaspora from the United Kingdom	1,780	(0.7%)
Total	254,330	
Note: Until July 1945, when recruitment was halted, some 26,830 Polish soldiers were declared killed in action or missing in action or had died of wounds. After that date, an additional 21,000 former Polish POWs were inducted.

At the capitulation of France, General Władysław Sikorski (the Polish commander-in-chief and prime minister) was able to evacuate many Polish troops—probably over 20,000—to the United Kingdom.

The Polish Navy had been the first to regroup off the shores of the United Kingdom. Polish ships and sailors had been sent to Britain in mid-1939 by General Sikorski, and a Polish-British Naval agreement was signed in November of the same year. Under this agreement, Polish sailors were permitted to don Polish uniforms, and their commanding officers were Polish; however, the ships used were of British manufacture. By 1940, the sailors had already impressed Winston Churchill, who remarked that he had "rarely seen a finer body of men".

After being evacuated after the defeat of France, Polish fliers had an important role in the Battle of Britain. At first, the Polish pilots were overlooked, despite being numerous (close to 8,500 by mid-1940). Despite having flown for years, most of them were posted either to RAF bomber squadrons or the RAF Volunteer Reserve. This was due to lack of understanding in the face of Polish defeat by the Germans, as well as language barriers and British commanders' opinion of Polish attitudes. On 11 June 1940, the Polish Government in Exile signed an agreement with the British Government to form a Polish Air Force in the UK, and in July 1940 the RAF announced that it would form two Polish fighter squadrons equipped with British planes: 302 "Poznański" Squadron and 303 "Kościuszko" Squadron. The squadrons were composed of Polish pilots and ground crews, although their flight commanders and commanding officers were British. Once given the opportunity to fly, it did not take long for their British counterparts to appreciate the tenacity of the Poles. Even Air Officer Commanding Hugh Dowding, who had been one of the first to voice his doubt of the Poles, said: "I must confess that I had been a little doubtful of the effect which their experience in their own countries and in France might have had upon the Polish and Czech pilots, but my doubts were laid to rest, because all three squadrons swung into the fight with a dash and enthusiasm which is beyond praise. They were inspired by a burning hatred for the Germans which made them very deadly opponents." Dowding later stated further that "had it not been for the magnificent [work of] the Polish squadrons and their unsurpassed gallantry, I hesitate to say that the outcome of the Battle would have been the same."

As for ground troops, some Polish ground units regrouped in southern Scotland. These units, as Polish I Corps, comprised the 1st Independent Rifle Brigade, the 10th Motorised Cavalry Brigade (as infantry) and cadre brigades (largely manned by surplus officers at battalion strength) and took over responsibility in October 1940 for the defence of the counties of Fife and Angus; this included reinforcing coastal defences that had already been started. I Corps was under the direct command of Scottish Command of the British Army. Whilst in this area, the Corps was reorganised and expanded. The opportunity to form another Polish army came in 1941, following an agreement between the Polish government in exile and Joseph Stalin, the Soviets releasing Polish soldiers, civilians and citizens from imprisonment. From these, a 75,000-strong army was formed in the Soviet Union under General Władysław Anders and informally known as "Anders' Army". This army, successively gathered in Bouzoulouk, Samarkand, was later ferried from Krasnovodsk across the Caspian Sea to the Middle East (Iran) where Polish II Corps was formed from it and other units in 1943.

By March 1944, the Polish Armed Forces in the West, fighting under British command, numbered 165,000 at the end of that year, including about 20,000 personnel in the Polish Air Force and 3,000 in the Polish Navy. By the end of the Second World War, they were 195,000 strong, and by July 1945 had increased to 228,000, most of the newcomers being released prisoners-of-war and ex-labor camp inmates.

The Polish Armed Forces in the West fought in most Allied operations against Nazi Germany in the Mediterranean and Middle East and European theatres: the North African Campaign, the Italian Campaign (with the Battle of Monte Cassino being one of the most notable), the Western European Campaign (from Dieppe Raid and D-Day through Battle of Normandy and latter operations, especially Operation Market Garden).

After the German Instrument of Surrender, Polish troops took part in occupation duties in the Western Allied Occupation Zones in Germany. A Polish town was created: it was first named Lwow, then Maczkow.

Polish troops were factored into the British 1945 top secret contingency plan, Operation Unthinkable, which considered a possible attack on the Soviet Union in order to enforce an independent Poland.

== Denouncement ==
By 1945, relations between the British government and its exiled Polish counterpart were increasingly tense. Britain's Foreign Secretary, Ernest Bevin, prioritized relations with the Soviet Union over the Polish government-in-exile as a way of preventing unrest among the pro-Soviet British working class, in particular its trade unions. Bevin and other British officials persuaded the Polish Armed Forces in the West to return to Poland, although none were forcibly returned. At the same time, there was British and American concern about a police state being built in Poland.

In March 1945, Time reported on Polish "Surplus Heroes", stating that Bevin

promised Anders that those of his soldiers who did not want to return to the new Poland could find asylum in the British Empire. Argentina and Brazil were also reported ready to offer them homes. But Britain thought the best solution would be for them to return to Poland, and Britain was circulating an appeal through the Polish Army containing the Polish Government's pledge to treat the soldier exiles fairly. Anders argued that he could not advise the soldiers to return to Poland unless the Polish Government promised elections this spring. Bevin, too, wanted immediate Polish elections, but both men knew that the chances were becoming slimmer. In Poland the split between the Communist-Socialist groups and shrewd Stanislaw Mikolajczyk's Polish Peasant Party was deepening. Security Police raids on Peasant Party headquarters were reported last week. If efforts to smash the Mikolajczyk forces failed, then the Communist-Socialist groups would fight for a late fall election, when the popularity of the Polish Peasant Party, sure winner of an election now, might have waned. Nevertheless, Bevin argued that, elections or no, the Poles in Anders' army should go home.

In January 1946, Bevin protested against killings by the Polish provisional government, which defended its actions saying it was fighting terrorists loyal to Anders and funded by the British. In February 1946, Time reported "Britain's Foreign Secretary Ernest Bevin told a tense House of Commons last week that terror had become an instrument of national policy in the new Poland. Many members of Vice Premier Stanislaw Mikolajczyk's Polish Peasant Party who opposed the Communist-dominated Warsaw Government had been murdered. "Circumstances in many cases appear to point to the complicity of the Polish Security Police... I regard it as imperative that the Polish Provisional Government should put an immediate stop to these crimes in order that free and unfettered elections may be held as soon as possible, in accordance with the Crimea decision... I am looking forward to the end of these police states." The Polish provisional government once again blamed Anders and his British backers for the bloodshed there.

It is often said that the Polish Armed Forces in the West were not invited to the London Victory Parade of 1946. At first the British government invited representatives of the newly recognised Polish People's Republic to march in the parade, but their delegation never arrived, with the reason never being adequately explained; the most likely explanation was Soviet pressure. Following criticism of the absence of a Polish delegation, 25 Polish RAF pilots were invited to march together with other foreign detachments as part of the parade of the Royal Air Force. They, in turn, refused to attend in protest over similar invitations not being extended to Polish army and navy personnel. The only Polish representative at the parade was Colonel Józef Kuropieska, the military attaché of the Polish People's Republic, who attended as a diplomatic courtesy.

== Disbandment and resettlement ==
The formation was disbanded in 1947, many of its soldiers choosing to remain in exile rather than to return to communist-controlled Poland, where they were often seen by the Polish communists as "enemies of the state", influenced by the Western ideas, loyal to the Polish government in exile, and thus meeting with persecution and imprisonment (in extreme cases, death). Failure of allied Western governments to keep their promise to Poland, which now fell under the Soviet sphere of influence, became known as the "Western betrayal." The number of Polish ex-soldiers unwilling to return to communist Poland was so high that a special organization was formed by the British government to assist settling them in the United Kingdom: the Polish Resettlement Corps (Polski Korpus Przysposobienia i Rozmieszczenia); 114,000 Polish soldiers went through that organization. Since many Poles had been stationed in the United Kingdom and served alongside British units in the war, the Polish Resettlement Act 1947 permitted all of them to settle in the United Kingdom after the war, multiplying the size of the Polish minority in the UK. Many also joined the Polish Canadian and Polish Australian communities. After the United States Congress passed a 1948 law, amended in 1950, which allowed the immigration of Polish soldiers who were demobilized in Great Britain, a number of them moved to the U.S. where, in 1952, they organized the association Polish Veterans of World War II.

== History by formation ==
=== Army ===
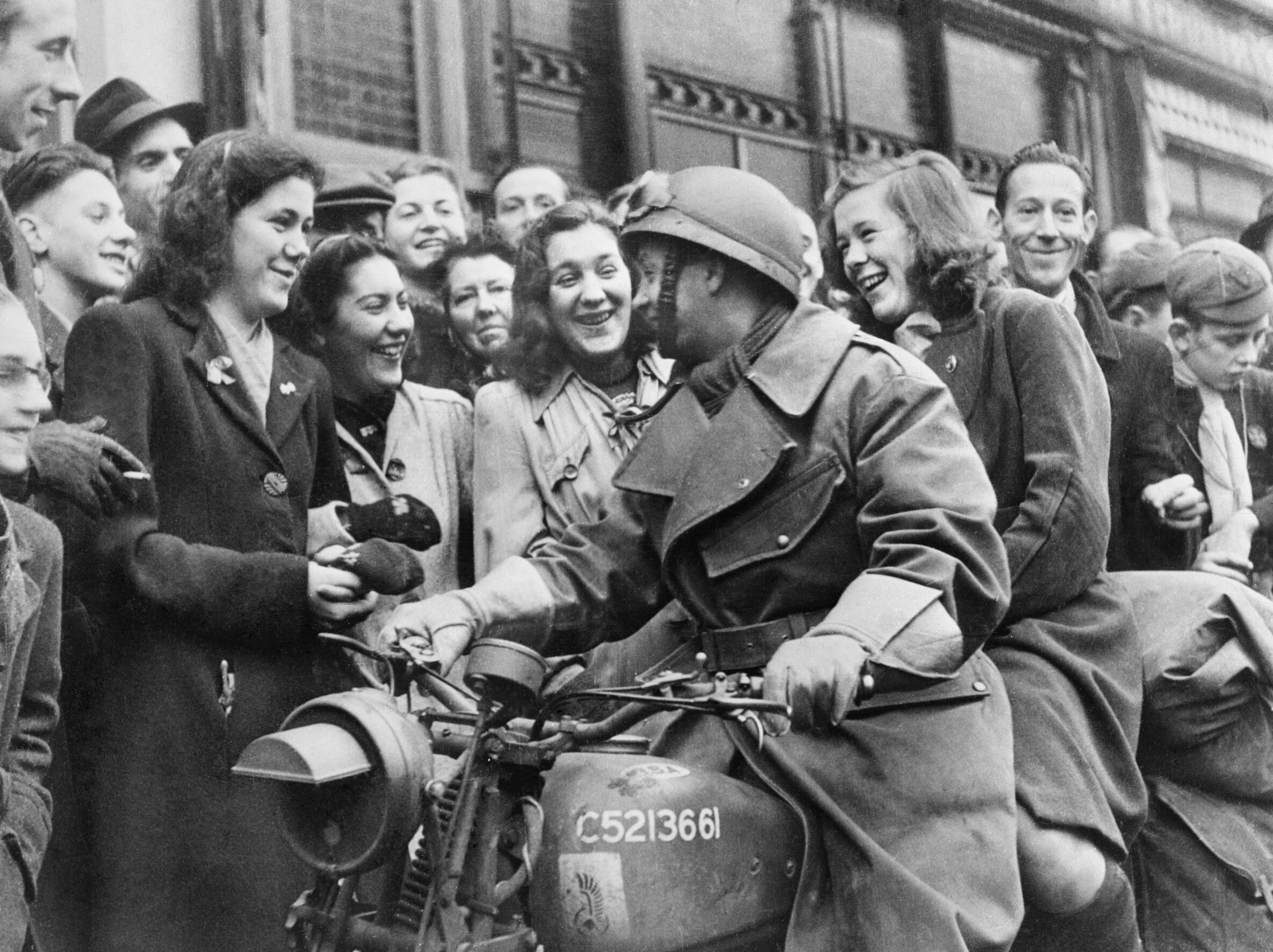
Polish soldiers welcomed by the residents of Breda, Netherlands, 1944

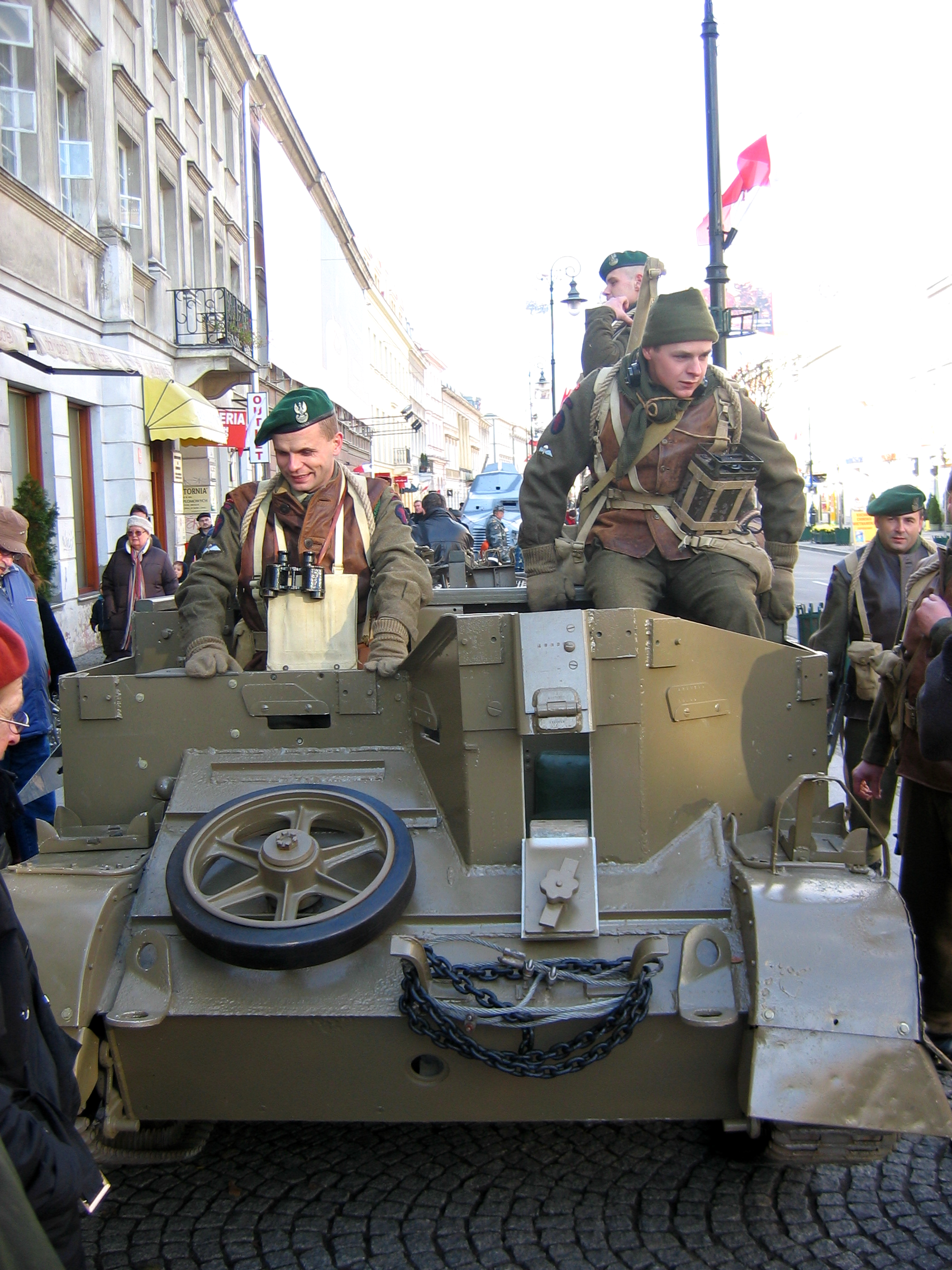
Universal Carrier of the Polish Armed Forces in the West (reenacting)

Polish military grave (the text reads "unknown soldiers") in the cemetery at Grainville-Langannerie, France

The Polish Army in France, which began to be organized soon after the fall of Poland in 1939, was composed of about 85,000 men.

Four Polish divisions (First Grenadier Division, Second Infantry Fusiliers Division, 3rd and 4th infantry divisions), a Polish motorized brigade (10th Brigade of Armored Cavalry, 10éme Brigade de cavalerie blindée) and infantry brigade (Polish Independent Highland Brigade) were organized in mainland France. Polish Independent Highland Brigade took part in the Battles of Narvik in early 1940; after the German invasion of France, all Polish units were pressed into formation although, due to inefficient French logistics and policies, all Polish units were missing much equipment and supplies—particularly the 3rd and 4th divisions, which were still in the middle of organization. In French-mandated Syria, a Polish Independent Carpathian Brigade was formed to which about 4,000 Polish troops had escaped, mostly through Romania and would later fight in the North African Campaign.

After the fall of France (during which about 6,000 Polish soldiers died fighting), about 13,000 Polish personnel had been interned in Switzerland. Nevertheless, Polish commander-in-chief and prime minister General Władysław Sikorski was able to evacuate many Polish troops to the United Kingdom (estimates range from 20,000 to 35,000). Overall, Polish soldiers made up approximately 70 percent of the total number of soldiers from Continental Europe in the United Kingdom in autumn 1940.

The Polish I Corps was formed from these soldiers and came to comprise the Polish 1st Armoured Division (which later became attached to the First Canadian Army) and the Polish Independent Parachute Brigade, and other formations, such as the 4th Infantry Division, and the 16th Independent Armoured Brigade. It was commanded by Gen. Stanisław Maczek and Marian Kukiel. Despite its name, it never reached corps strength and was not used as a tactical unit until after the war, when it took part in the occupation of Germany as part of the Allied forces stationed around the port of Wilhelmshaven. Prior to that date, its two main units fought separately and were grouped together mostly for logistical reasons. In August 1942, the British Commandos formed No. 6 troop which was integrated into No.10 (Inter-Allied) Commando attached to the 1st Special Service Brigade. No. 6 (Polish) Troop was under the command of Captain Smrokowski and comprised seven officers and 84 men.

As well as soldiers from the Polish army in France, the Polish army in exile recruited among Polish emigrants in North America and Latin America. After 1942, it also began to recruit among Wehrmacht prisoners of war who had been captured by Allied forces in the Mediterranean theatre and on a smaller scale also Polish soldiers in the French Foreign Legion. Some came from the 13,000 Polish personnel who were interned by the Swiss government, but who managed to escape Swiss custody and make their way to Great Britain via the British consulates in Switzerland.

In 1941, following an agreement between the Polish government in exile and Joseph Stalin, the Soviets released Polish citizens, from whom a 75,000-strong army was formed in the Soviet Union under General Władysław Anders (Anders' Army). This army, successively gathered in Bouzoulouk, Samarkand, was later ferried from Krasnovodsk to the Middle East (Iran) through the Caspian Sea (in March and August 1942). The Polish units later formed the Polish II Corps. It was composed of Polish 3rd Carpathian Infantry Division, Polish 5th Kresowa Infantry Division, Polish 2nd Armoured Brigade and other units.

=== Air force ===
No. 303 Polish Fighter Squadron

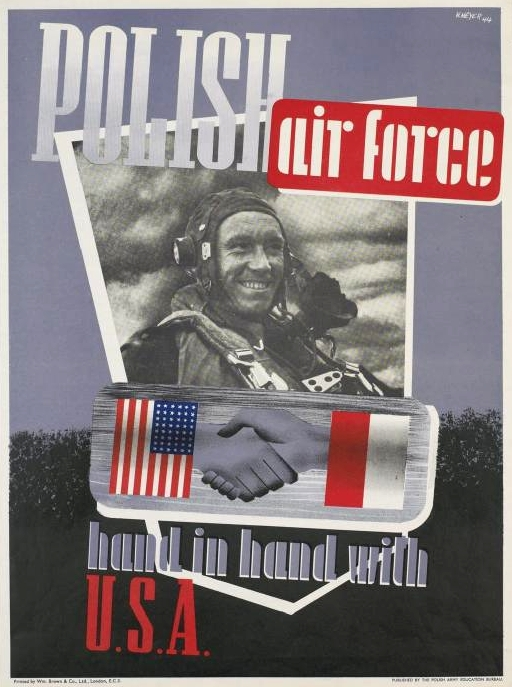

The Polish Air Force fought in the Battle of France as one fighter squadron GC 1/145, several small units detached to French squadrons, and numerous flights of industry defence (approximately 130 pilots, who achieved 55 victories at a loss of 15 men).

From the very beginning of the war, the Royal Air Force (RAF) had welcomed foreign pilots to supplement the dwindling pool of British pilots. On 11 June 1940, the Polish government in exile signed an agreement with the British government to form a Polish army and Polish air force in the United Kingdom. The first two (of an eventual ten) Polish fighter squadrons went into action in August 1940. Four Polish squadrons eventually took part in the Battle of Britain (300 and 301 Bomber Squadrons; 302 and 303 fighter squadrons), with 89 Polish pilots. Together with more than 50 Poles fighting in British squadrons, about 145 Polish pilots defended British skies. Polish pilots were among the most experienced in the battle, most of them having already fought in the 1939 September Campaign in Poland and the 1940 Battle of France. Additionally, prewar Poland had set a very high standard of pilot training. No. 303 Squadron, named after the Polish-American hero, General Tadeusz Kościuszko, achieved the highest number of kills (126) of all fighter squadrons engaged in the Battle of Britain, even though it only joined the combat on 30 August 1940. These Polish pilots, representing about 5% of total Allied pilots in the Battle, were responsible for 12% of total victories (203) in the Battle and achieved the highest number of kills of any Allied squadron.

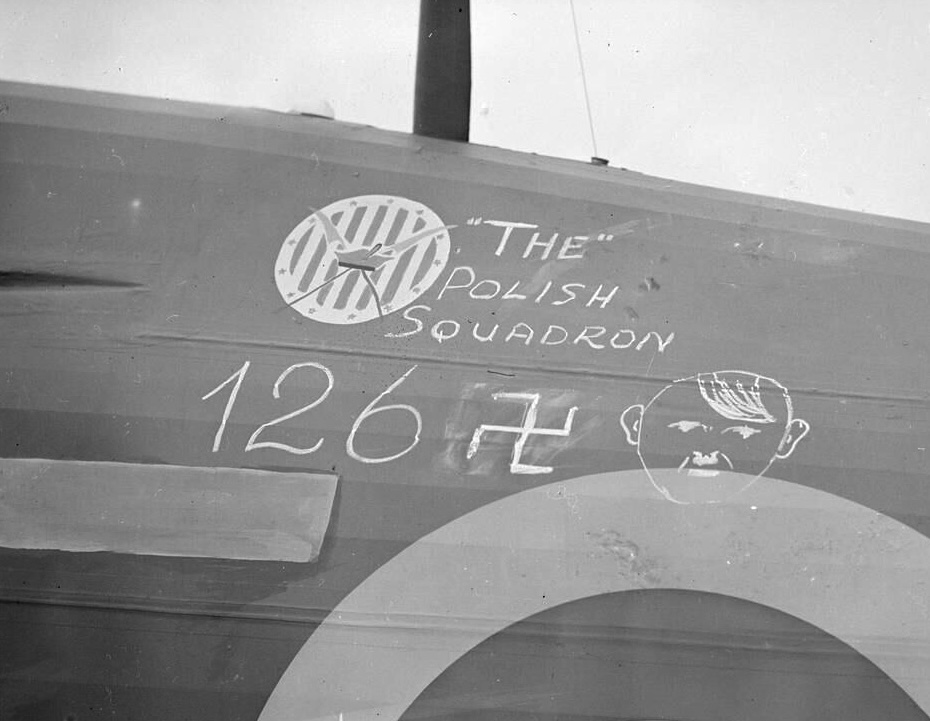
126 German airplanes shot down by the 303 Squadron during the Battle of Britain. Painted on a Hurricane.

The Polish Air Force also fought in 1943 in Tunisia (the Polish Fighting Team, known as "Skalski's Circus") and in raids on Germany (1940–45). In the second half of 1941 and early 1942, Polish bomber squadrons were the sixth part of forces available to RAF Bomber Command (later they suffered heavy losses, with little possibility of replenishment). Polish aircrew losses serving with Bomber Command 1940-45 were 929 killed; total Polish aircrew losses were 1,803 killed. Ultimately eight Polish fighter squadrons were formed within the RAF and had claimed 621 Axis aircraft destroyed by May 1945. By the end of the war, around 19,400 Poles were serving in the RAF.

Polish squadrons in the United Kingdom:

- No. 300 "Masovia" Polish Bomber Squadron (Ziemi Mazowieckiej)
- No. 301 "Pomerania" Polish Bomber Squadron (Ziemi Pomorskiej) 1940 to 1943 when 301 Bomber Squadron merged with 300 Sqn.
- No. 301 "Pomerania and Defenders of Warsaw" Polish Transport "Special Duties" Squadron (Ziemi Pomorskiej im Obrońców Warszawy) 1944 to 1946.
- No. 302 "City of Poznan" Polish Fighter Squadron (Poznański)
- No. 303 "Kościuszko" Polish Fighter Squadron (Warszawski imienia Tadeusza Kościuszki)
- No. 304 "Silesia" Polish Bomber Squadron (Ziemi Śląskiej imienia Ksiecia Józefa Poniatowskiego)
- No. 305 "Greater Poland" Polish Bomber Squadron (Ziemi Wielkopolskiej imienia Marszałka Józefa Piłsudskiego)
- No. 306 "City of Toruń" Polish Fighter Squadron (Toruński)
- No. 307 "City of Lwów" Polish Fighter Squadron (Lwowskich Puchaczy)
- No. 308 "City of Kraków" Polish Fighter Squadron (Krakowski)
- No. 309 "Czerwień" Polish Fighter-Reconnaissance Squadron (Ziemi Czerwieńskiej)
- No. 315 "City of Dęblin" Polish Fighter Squadron (Dębliński)
- No. 316 "City of Warsaw" Polish Fighter Squadron (Warszawski)
- No. 317 "City of Wilno" Polish Fighter Squadron (Wileński)
- No. 318 "City of Gdańsk" Polish Fighter-Reconnaissance Squadron (Gdański)
- No. 663 Polish Artillery Observation Squadron
- No. 145 Fighter Squadron Polish Fighting Team (Skalski's Circus)

=== Navy ===
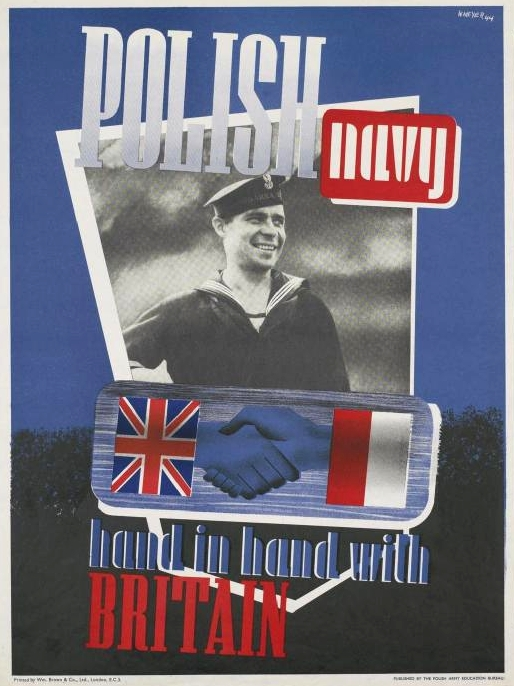

Just on the eve of war, three destroyers—representing most of the major Polish Navy ships—had been sent for safety to the British Isles (Operation Peking). There they fought alongside the Royal Navy (RN). At various stages of the war, the Polish Navy comprised two cruisers and a large number of smaller ships; most were RN ships loaned to take advantage of availability of Polish crews at a time when the Royal Navy had insufficient manpower to crew all its ships. The Polish Navy fought with great distinction alongside the other Allied navies in many important and successful operations, including those conducted against the German battleship, Bismarck. With their 26 ships (2 cruisers, 9 destroyers, 5 submarines and 11 torpedo boats), the Polish Navy sailed a total of 1.2 million nautical miles during the war, escorted 787 convoys, conducted 1,162 patrols and combat operations, sank 12 enemy ships (including 5 submarines) and 41 merchant vessels, damaged 24 more (including 8 submarines) and shot down 20 aircraft. The number of seamen who lost their lives in action was 450 out of over 4,000.

- Cruisers:
  - ORP Dragon (Danae class)
  - ORP Conrad (Danae class)
- Destroyers:
  - ORP Burza ("Storm") (Wicher class)
  - ORP Grom ("Thunder") (Grom class) – lost 1940
  - ORP Błyskawica ("Lightning") (Grom class)
  - ORP Garland (G-class)
  - ORP Orkan (M-class), - torpedoed October 1943
  - OF Ouragan ("Hurricane", also known in some Polish sources as Huragan) (Bourrasque class) - returned to Free French in 1941
  - ORP Piorun ("Thunderbolt") (N-class) - 1940 onwards
- Escort destroyers
  - ORP Krakowiak ("Cracovian") (Hunt-class escort) - 1941 onwards
  - ORP Kujawiak ("Kujawian") (Hunt class) - sunk 1942
  - ORP Ślązak ("Silesian") (Hunt class) - 1942 onwards
- Submarines:
  - ORP Orzeł ("Eagle") (Orzel class) – lost 1940
  - ORP Jastrząb ("Hawk") (American S-class) – lost 1942
  - ORP Wilk ("Wolf") (Wilk class)
  - ORP Dzik ("Boar") (British U-class)
  - ORP Sokół ("Falcon") (British U-class) - 1941 onwards

As well as the above, there were a number of minor ships, transports, merchant-marine auxiliary vessels, and patrol boats.

=== Intelligence and resistance ===
The Polish intelligence structure remained mostly intact following the fall of Poland in 1939 and continued to report to the Polish Government in Exile. Known as the 'Second Department', it cooperated with the other Allies in every European country and operated one of the largest intelligence networks in Nazi Germany. Many Poles also served in other Allied intelligence services, including the celebrated Krystyna Skarbek ("Christine Granville") in the United Kingdom's Special Operations Executive. Forty-three percent of all the reports received by the British secret services from continental Europe in 1939-45 came from Polish sources.

The majority of Polish resistance (particularly the dominant Armia Krajowa organization) were also loyal to the government in exile with the Government Delegate's Office at Home being the highest authority of the Polish Secret State. Although military actions of the Polish resistance operating in Poland and its armed forces operating in the West are not commonly grouped together, several important links existed between them, in addition to the common chain of command. Resistance gathered and passed vital intelligence to the West (for example on Nazi concentration camps and about the V-1 flying bomb and the V-2 rocket); while in the West supplies were gathered for the resistance, and elite commandos, the Cichociemni, were trained. The Polish government also wanted to use the Polish 1st Independent Parachute Brigade in Poland, particularly during Operation Tempest, but the request was denied by the Allies.

== See also ==
- Polish Armed Forces in the East
- Polish contribution to World War II
- Polish Armed Forces (Second Polish Republic)
- Armia Ludowa
- Gwardia Ludowa
- First Polish Army (1944–1945)
- Polish People's Army
- Polish Combatants' Association (United States)
- Western betrayal
- Polish British
- Civilian Labor Group
- Sikorski's tourists
- Bataliony Chłopskie
- List of World War II military equipment of Poland
- 7 Regiment Royal logistic Corps (British Army)

== Bibliography ==
- Clare Mulley, The Spy Who Loved: The Secrets and Lives of Christine Granville, Britain's First Special Agent of World War II, London, Macmillan, 2012, ISBN 978-1-4472-2565-2.
- Michael Alfred Peszke, Battle for Warsaw, 1939-1944, Boulder, Colorado, East European Monographs, distributed by Columbia University Press, 1995, 325 pp., ISBN 0-88033-324-3.
- Michael Alfred Peszke, Poland's Navy, 1918-1945, New York, Hippocrene Books, 1999, 222 pp., ISBN 0-7818-0672-0.
- Michael Alfred Peszke, The Polish Underground Army, the Western Allies, and the Failure of Strategic Unity in World War II, foreword by Piotr S. Wandycz, Jefferson, North Carolina, McFarland & Company, 2005, 244 pp., ISBN 0-7864-2009-X.
- Michael Alfred Peszke, "The Demise of the Polish Armed Forces in the West, 1945–1947," The Polish Review, vol. LV, no. 2, 2010, pp. 231–39.
- Michael Alfred Peszke, review of Arkady Fiedler, 303 Squadron: The Legendary Battle of Britain Squadron, translated by Jarek Garliński, Los Angeles, Aquila Polonica, 2010, ISBN 978-1-60772-004-1, in The Polish Review, vol. LV, no. 4, 2010, pp. 467–68. Unique Identifier: 709924806.
- Michael Alfred Peszke, "The British-Polish Agreement of August 1940: Its Antecedents, Significance and Consequences," Journal of Slavic Military Studies (print: ISSN 1351-8046; online: ISSN 1556-3006), Taylor & Francis Group, no. 24, 2011, pp. 648–58.
- Michael Alfred Peszke, The Armed Forces of Poland in the West, 1939–46: Strategic Concepts, Planning, Limited Success but No Victory!, Helion Studies in Military History, no. 13, Solihull, England, Helion & Company, Ltd, 2013, ISBN 978-1-908916-54-9.
