= Jewish Legion (Anders Army) =

Proposed Polish military unit in WWII

The Jewish Legion was a proposed military unit intended to be part of the Polish Anders' Army in the Soviet Union during World War II. Never fully realized, it was evacuated from the Soviet Union and made its way through Iran to Palestine. Upon arrival, many people with the legion joined the ranks of the Yishuv in Mandatory Palestine.

== Background ==
After the Soviet invasion of Poland in 1939 and the subsequent annexation of Eastern Poland, the Soviets deported about 325,000 Polish citizens, including a number of Polish Jews, from Soviet-occupied Poland to the Soviet Union in 1940 and 1941.

Following the German invasion of the Soviet Union, in July 1941 the Sikorski–Mayski agreement was signed between the Polish government in exile and the Soviet Union. This agreement allowed for the creation of a semi-independent Polish Army in the Soviet territory. The idea for a Jewish Legion was raised by Jewish Zionist activists about a year later. They hoped that such a unit would facilitate the creation of an independent Land of Israel; another goal was to reduce some reported tensions between Poles and the Jews within the recreated Polish Army. Indeed, one of the groups supporting the creation of this unit, as noted by Israel Gutman, were plain anti-Semites who wanted to rid the [Polish] Armed Forces of Jews through the medium of the "Jewish Legion". However, the Jews themselves were also divided on this idea which, while supported by the Zionists, was opposed by the more assimilated Jews, including Bundists such as Henryk Erlich and Wiktor Alter. Vocal opponents of the idea within the Jewish ranks included the Bundist politician Lucjan Blit, who even compared it to a "moral victory" for Nazism through the creation of a "Jewish ghetto within the Polish Armed Forces".

== Proposal ==
The unit was initially proposed to be created within the Anders' Army. The idea was eventually rejected by the Polish authorities, chiefly the ambassador Stanisław Kot and general Władysław Anders. Kot concluded that it would result in disunity and unnecessary fragmentation of Polish sources, benefiting the Soviets, and would likely not be well received in the West. Likewise, Anders rejected the idea arguing that it would open doors for other ethnic minorities found within the Polish ranks to counter-productively demand their own formations and that all citizens of Poland should simply serve in the same formation. Another consideration for both Kot and Anders was related to the Soviet stance which questioned whether non-ethnic Poles should be recognized as proper citizens of Poland, and whether they should be recruited into the new Polish formations or into the Soviet Army itself. Therefore, Kot, Anders, and some Jewish activists who opposed this plan viewed the Jewish Legion idea as endangering Jews and other minorities' status as Polish citizens.

== Jewish battalion at Koltubanka ==
Despite the eventual rejection of the plan, a single Jewish battalion, commanded by Polish Army colonel Janusz Gaładyk, was created in Koltubanka, near Samara, around October 1941. It was likely intended as a form of a model and a test for the future Legion. The battalion never saw combat, and was disbanded around May and June of 1942, around the time that the Anders' Army was being relocated outside Soviet territory to the British-controlled Middle East. Upon arrival in Mandatory Palestine, many members of the battalion joined the body of Jewish residents (Yishuv) there.

== See also ==
- Jewish Brigade, part of the British Army in World War II
- Jewish Legion, a name used to refer to battalions of the Royal Fusiliers of the British Army in World War I
