= Wiktor Weintraub =

Polish diplomat (1908–1988)

Wiktor Weintraub (April 10, 1908 – July 14, 1988) was a Polish historian who specialized in history of Polish literature.

Born in a Polish Jewish family, Weintraub fled Poland during World War II. During this period, he worked for the Polish government in exile.

After the war, Weintraub spent time in British Palestine, the United Kingdom and then the United States. He was a professor at Harvard University. Among his most significant works are his studies about Adam Mickiewicz. He has been described as an "expert on Mickiewicz thought."
