= Michael Schudrich =

American rabbi

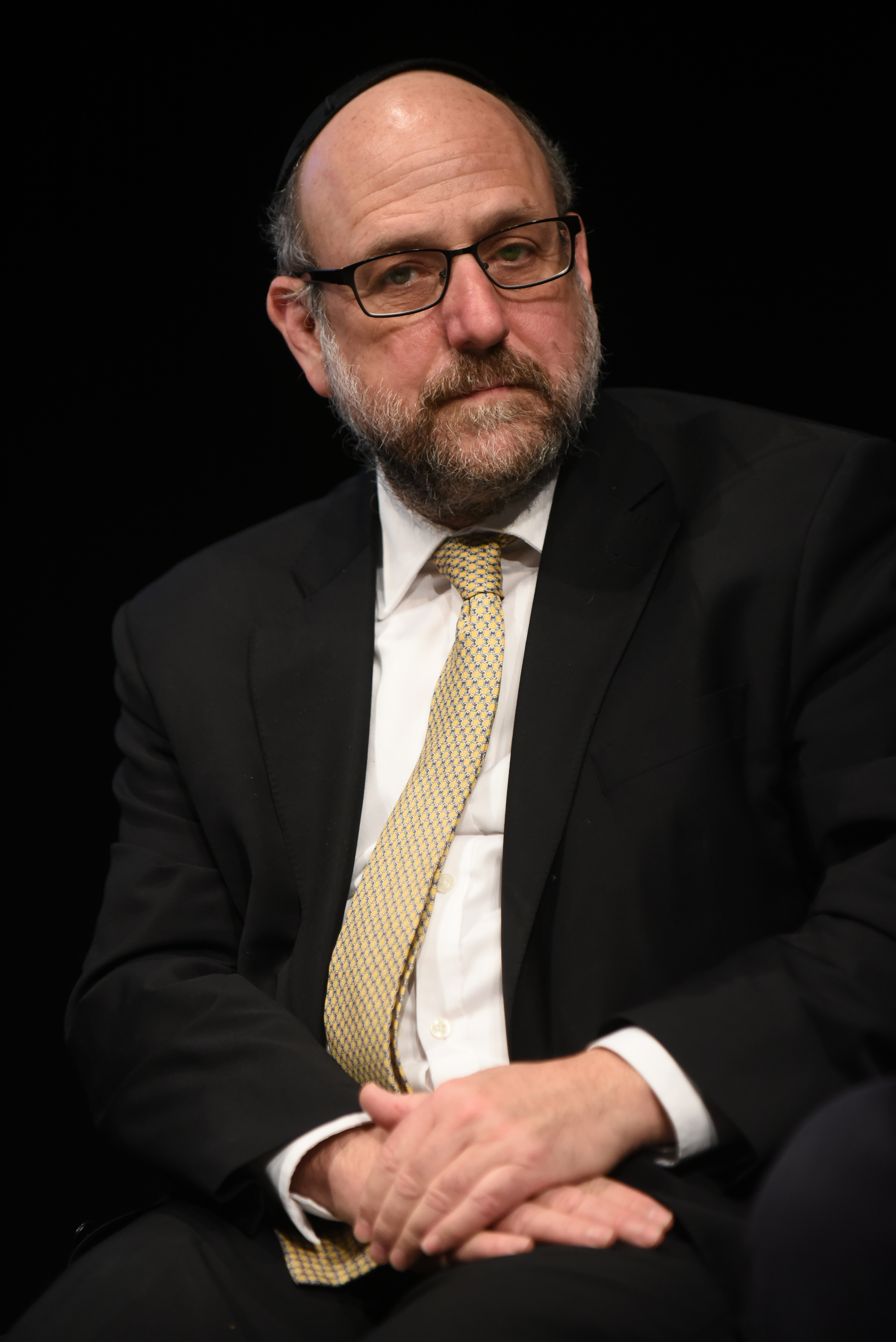
- Title: Chief Rabbi of Poland, Rabbi of Łódź, Rabbi of Warsaw

Personal life
- Born: June 15, 1955 (age 70) New York City, U.S.
- Parents: David Schudrich (father); Doris Goldfarb Schudrich (mother)

Religious life
- Religion: Judaism

Michael Joseph Schudrich (born June 15, 1955) is an American-Polish rabbi and the current Chief Rabbi of Poland. He is the oldest of four children of Rabbi David Schudrich and Doris Goldfarb Schudrich.

== Biography ==
Born in New York City to a Polish-Jewish family. Schudrich lived in Patchogue, New York, where his father served as a pulpit rabbi. His grandparents emigrated to the United States from Baligród, Poland, before World War II.

Educated in Jewish day schools in the New York City area, Schudrich graduated from Stony Brook University in 1977 with a Religious Studies major and received an MA in History from Columbia University in 1982. He received Conservative smicha (rabbinical ordination) from the Jewish Theological Seminary of America and later, an Orthodox smicha through Yeshiva University from Rabbi Moshe Tendler. He served as rabbi of the Jewish Community of Japan from 1983 to 1989.

After leading Jewish groups on numerous trips to Europe, Schudrich began working for the Ronald S. Lauder Foundation and resided in Warsaw, Poland, from 1992 to 1998.

He returned to Poland in June 2000 as Rabbi of Warsaw and Łódź, and in December 2004 was appointed Chief Rabbi of Poland. Schudrich has played a central role in the "Jewish Renaissance" in Poland.

Schudrich is a member of the Rabbinical Council of America and the Conference of European Rabbis. In Kashrut he cooperates with the Orthodox Union, the Chief Rabbinate of Israel and other Kashrut organizations. Schudrich has been a Polish citizen since November 3, 2005, and now holds both American and Polish citizenship.

On May 27, 2006, Schudrich was assaulted with what appeared to be pepper spray in central Warsaw by a 33-year-old man. According to the police, the perpetrator had ties to "Nazi organizations" and a history of football-related hooliganism. Schudrich hit back, and the attack on him brought condemnation from Polish media and politicians.

Schudrich had been invited to travel on the aircraft that crashed on 10 April 2010 near Smolensk, Russia, killing 96 people including Polish president Lech Kaczyński. He refused as it would have violated the Jewish Sabbath, a decision which saved his life.

In February 2018, Schudrich entered into discussion with the Parliament of Poland with the hope of amending a proposed animal-rights law that would restrict kosher slaughter in Poland. During the same month he implored with Jewish leaders to refrain from boycotting Poland over the "Holocaust law", which criminalizes any public statements that the Polish nation was complicit in Nazi war crimes.

== See also ==
- History of the Jews in Poland
- Polish-Jewish relations
