= Wacław W. Soroka =

Polish-American historian (1917–1999)

Wacław W. Soroka (1917–1999) was a Polish-American historian.

During WWII he was a member of the Polish resistance (Bataliony Chłopskie and Armia Krajowa). After the war he joined the anti-communist underground (Freedom and Independence) and shortly afterward, in 1947, emigrated abroad. He was active in the French emigre Polish People's Party. In 1954 he moved to the United States, where from 1963 he lectured in the University of Wisconsin–Stevens Point. In his research he focused on the history of Poland and the political system of Soviet satellite states.
