= Aquila Polonica =

Aquila Polonica Publishing
- Founded: 2005; 21 years ago
- Founder: Terry A. Tegnazian; Stefan Mucha
- Country of origin: United States
- Headquarters location: Los Angeles
- Distribution: Simon & Schuster
- Official website: www.polandww2.com

Aquila Polonica is an independent publishing house based in the U.S. and the U.K., founded in 2005 by Terry A. Tegnazian and Stefan Mucha. The company specializes in books based on eyewitness accounts, in English, of Poland in World War II.

The company's mission is to expand the availability of literature in English about Poland's role in World War II. To that end, Tegnazian and Mucha have acquired the rights to more than 30 titles.

== Non-fiction ==
Aquila Polonica published its first title, The Mermaid and the Messerschmitt: War Through a Woman’s Eyes, 1939–1940, in 2009. Author Rulka Langer was a young Vassar-educated career woman who recorded the events she experienced in Warsaw when the Nazis attacked and occupied the city during the opening days of WWII. "Rulka was an ordinary person, a working mother, caught up in the chaos of war," said publisher Terry Tegnazian in an interview on Lifetime Television.

The revised edition of Langer's original 1942 book includes more than 100 archival photos and illustrations, many reproduced with permission of the Holocaust Museum in Washington D.C. The Mermaid and the Messerschmitt won the 2010 Benjamin Franklin Silver Award in the category of The Bill Fisher Award for Best First Book (Nonfiction).

The Ice Road: An Epic Journey from the Stalinist Labor Camps to Freedom, by Stefan Waydenfeld, was published in 2010. It tells the story of the Waydenfeld family's forcible deportation to the frozen wastes of Russia and the long journey to freedom through the eyes of a 14-year-old narrator. The book won a Silver Award for Autobiography/Memoir at the 2011 Benjamin Franklin Awards, which recognize excellence in independent publishing.

''303 Squadron: The Legendary Battle of Britain Fighter Squadron, by Arkady Fiedler, with a new translation by Jarek Garlinski, was published by Aquila Polonica in 2010. The book chronicles the exploits of the Polish fighter pilots who flew in 303 Squadron in the skies over England during World War II. It was awarded the top Gold Award in the History category, and a Silver Award for Interior Design at the 2011 Benjamin Franklin Awards

The Auschwitz Volunteer: Beyond Bravery, by Witold Pilecki, translated by Jarek Garlinski, was published by Aquila Polonica in 2012. In 1940, Polish Army officer Pilecki volunteered to get himself arrested by the Nazis in a Warsaw roundup (in Polish, łapanka, [waˈpanka] in order to smuggle out intelligence about what was taking place inside the notorious concentration camp and organize a resistance network whose ultimate goal was to help liberate the camp. This is the first book published containing an English translation of Pilecki's 1945 full report to his superior officers. In the foreword, Poland's chief rabbi, Michael Schudrich, states, “If heeded, Pilecki’s early warnings might have changed the course of history.”

== Fiction ==
Maps and Shadows, a debut novel by Connecticut poet Krysia Jopek, was published in 2010 and won a Silver Benjamin Franklin Award 2011 in the category of Historical Fiction. This fictionalized family saga is written from the points of view of four family members: a father, a mother, a sister and a brother. World War II uproots the family and sends them to all corners of the globe—Russian, Persia, Iran, Africa, England and, finally, to the United States.

== Film ==
Siege is the 1940 Academy Award-nominated short newsreel shot by American photojournalist Julien Bryan during the attack on Warsaw by the Nazis in the opening days of World War II. Siege was inducted into the U.S. National Film Registry in 2006. The film has been restored and was released on DVD by Aquila Polonica in 2010. An audio essay by Julien Bryan, "Friendship Is a Passport," recorded for Edward R. Murrow's "This I Believe" radio series in the early 1950s, accompanies the newsreel.
