= Underground media in German-occupied Europe =

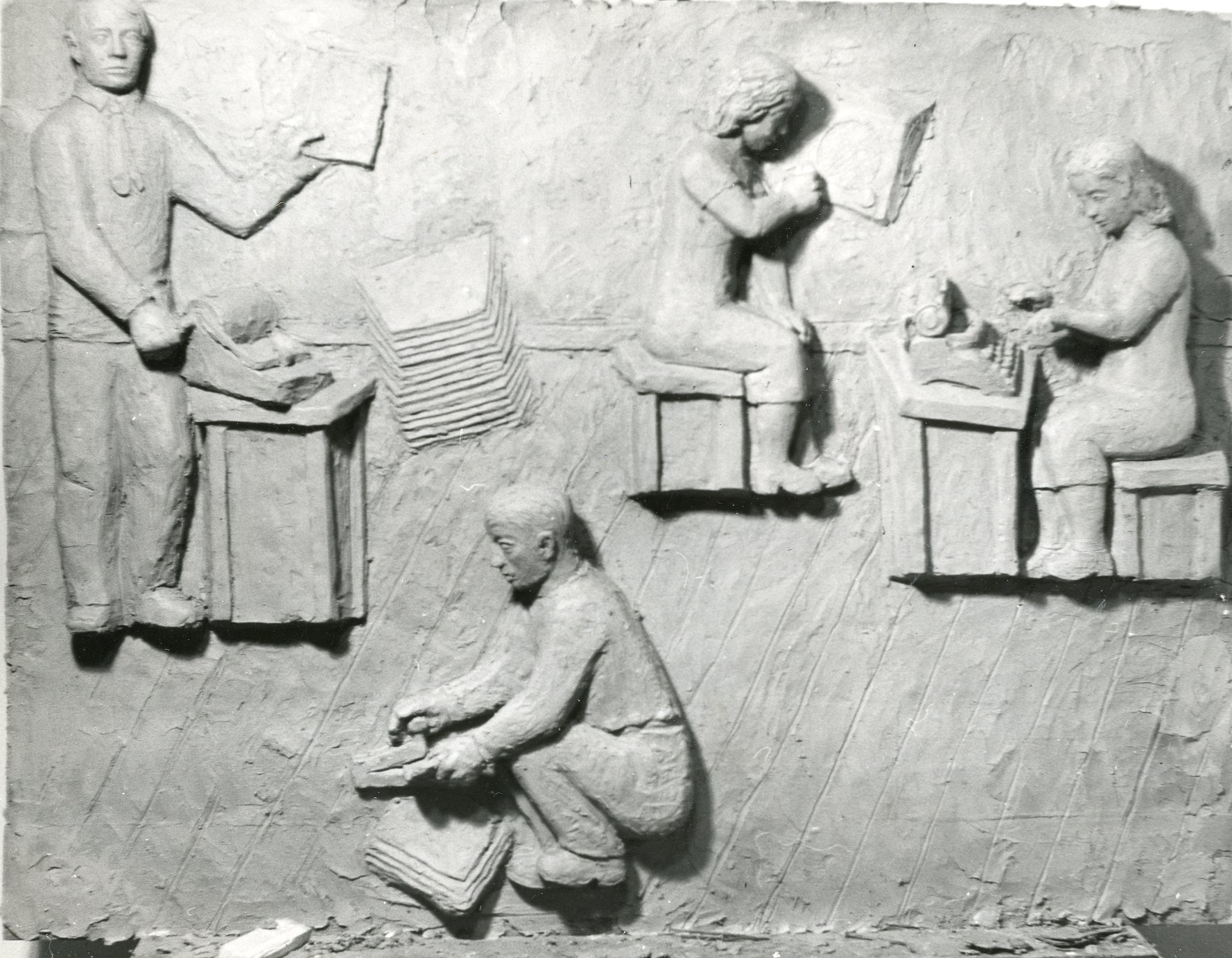
Depiction of the production of a typewritten underground newspaper by the Norwegian artist Odd Hilt. At the top, a woman listens to an Allied radio broadcast while another types articles on a typewriter. On the left, a person produces copies on a mimeograph. The sheets are stapled into brochures at the bottom.

Various kinds of clandestine media emerged under German occupation during World War II. By 1942, Nazi Germany occupied much of continental Europe. The widespread German occupation saw the fall of public media systems in France, Belgium, Poland, Norway, Czechoslovakia, Northern Greece, and the Netherlands. All press systems were placed under the ultimate control of Joseph Goebbels, the German Minister of Propaganda.

Without control of the media, occupied populations began to create and publish their own uncensored newspapers, books and political pamphlets. The underground press played a "crucial role" in informing and motivating resistance across the continent and building solidarity. They also created an "intellectual battlefield" in which ideas like post-war reconstruction could be discussed. Underground forms of media allowed for information sharing among the oppressed, helping them build solidarity, strengthen morale and, in some cases, stage uprisings.

== By country ==
=== Belgium ===
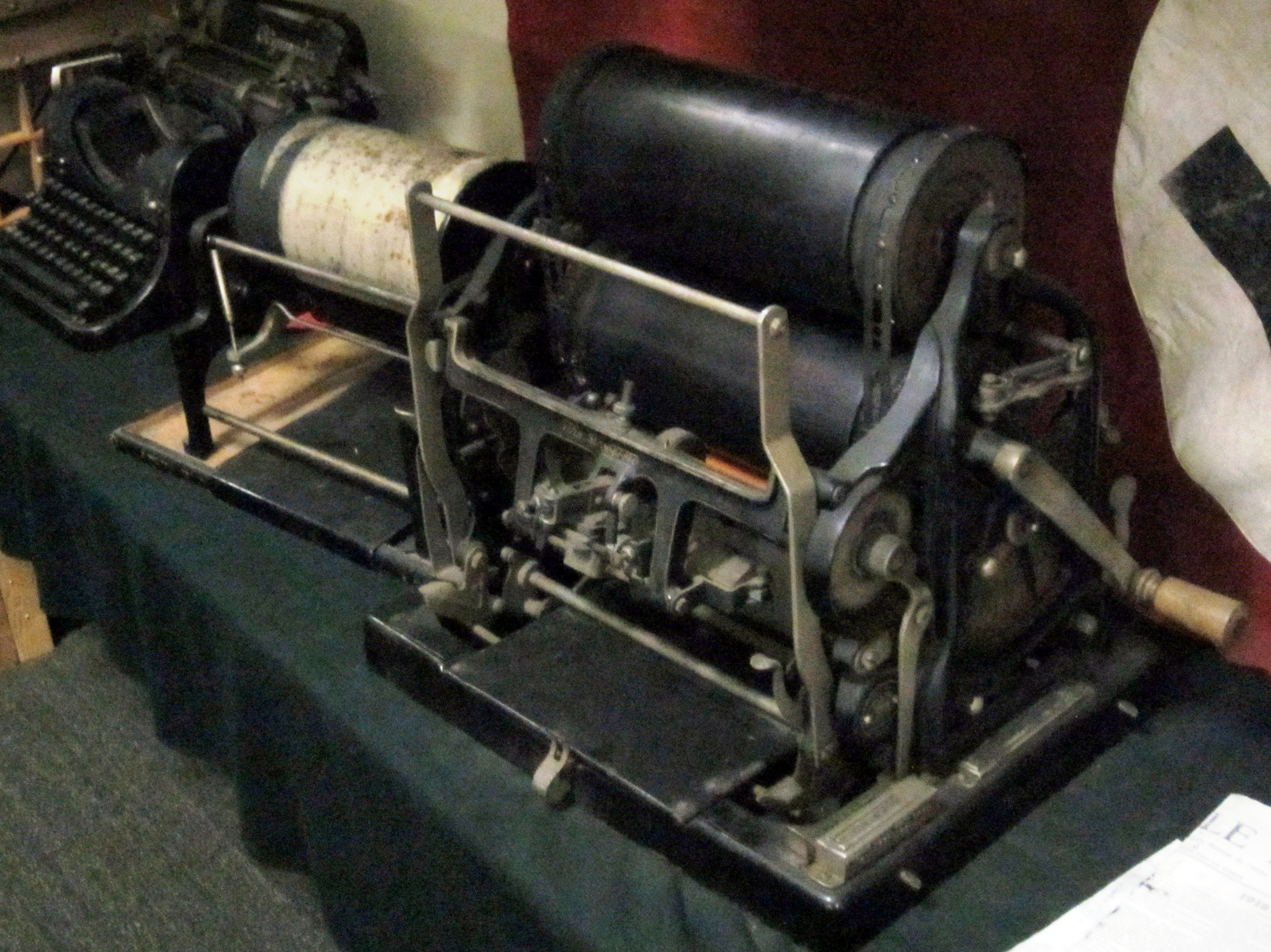
Examples of mimeograph machines used by the Belgian resistance to produce illegal newspapers and publications

An important underground press emerged from the Belgian Resistance in German-occupied Belgium soon after the defeat in May 1940. Eight underground newspapers had appeared by October 1940 alone. Much of the resistance's press focused around producing newspapers in both French and Dutch languages as alternatives to censored or pro-collaborationist newspapers. At its peak, the clandestine newspaper La Libre Belgique, a title which had first appeared under German occupation in World War I, was relaying news within five to six days; faster than the BBC's French-language radio broadcasts, whose coverage lagged several months behind events. Copies of the underground newspapers were distributed anonymously, with some pushed into letterboxes or sent by post.

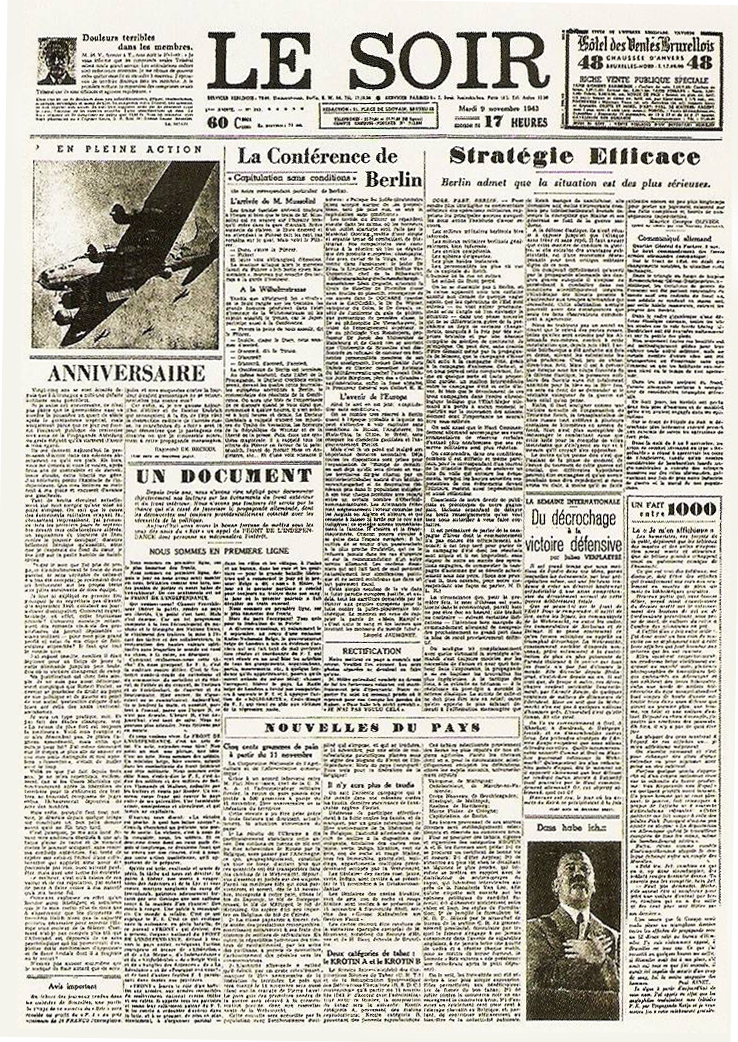
The Faux Soir was a one-edition satirical issue of the German-controlled Le Soir newspaper.

Since they were usually free, the costs of printing were financed by donations from sympathisers. The papers achieved considerable circulation, with La Libre Belgique reaching a regular circulation of 40,000 by January 1942 and peaking at 70,000, while the Communist paper, Le Drapeau Rouge, reached 30,000. Dozens of different newspapers existed, often affiliated with different resistance groups or differentiated by political stance, ranging from nationalist, Communist, Liberal or even Feminist. The number of Belgians involved in the underground press is estimated at anywhere up to 40,000 people. In total, 567 separate titles are known from the period of occupation.

The resistance also printed humorous publications and material as propaganda. In November 1943, on the anniversary of the German surrender in the First World War, the Front de l'Indépendance group published a spoof edition of the censored newspaper Le Soir, satirizing the Axis propaganda and biased information permitted by the censors. The new newspaper was then distributed to newsstands across Brussels and deliberately mixed with ordinary official newspapers to be sold to the public. 50,000 copies of the spoof publication, dubbed the "Faux Soir" (literally, the "Fake Le Soir"), were sold.

In 2012, the Centre for Historical Research and Documentation on War and Contemporary Society (Cegesoma) launched a project to digitally archive all surviving Belgian clandestine publications from both World War I and II.

=== Channel Islands ===
The Channel Islands were occupied by Germany in June 1940 and were the only British territory invaded during the war. Although little active resistance occurred, a number of underground publications existed. The most notable was the Guernsey Underground News Sheet, or GUNS, on Guernsey. The newspaper, directed by Frank Falla and published between 1942 and 1944, reproduced material from BBC news bulletins. Its workers were denounced in February 1944 and deported to concentration camps.

=== Czechoslovakia ===
An underground press emerged rapidly in Czechoslovakia after the German annexation and invasion of 1938–39. One of the first was the newspaper V boj (To Fight) published by Josef Skalda in Prague. Although it achieved a circulation of 10,000, Skalda was arrested in November 1939 and the publication ceased. Later newspapers included the Voice of the People and National Liberation.

In 1941, during German occupation of Czechoslovakia, the Czech Resistance was in radio contact with the exiled Czech government in London. These radios were strategically airdropped by Allied forces, and by October 1941, all resistance radios had been discovered by the Gestapo. There were multiple airdrops in 1942 that led to new radio contact between January and June 1942. These secret radio stations were not only used with the sole purpose of communicating with London, but could also reach the Czech people. These secret radio stations would broadcast military intelligence and reports of both Nazi movements and Allied movements. These reports varied, some were true, some were false and served only to raise national morale. Many consider these clandestine radios to be a failure for their lack of reporting on the state of the Jewish population in Czechoslovakia, under Nazi rule.

The Czechoslovak resistance groups were also known to send anti-Nazi pamphlets into Germany, in hopes that anti-fascist Germans would rise up against the Nazi regime. They would hide the small books and other pieces of anti-Nazi literature in tea pouches, shampoo, plant seed packaging, and German tourist pamphlets etc. One of the better known pamphlets was inside the German tourism brochure Lernen Sie das schöne Deutschland kennen (Learn About Beautiful Germany) which included a map of the Nazi death camps.

=== Denmark ===
Following their invasion of Denmark in 1940, the Germans did not confiscate the population's radios, removing much of the need for underground media. Only with the 1941 banning of the Communist Party of Denmark did a significant underground press emerge, with the illegal continued publishing of the Communist Party's paper Land og Folk. At its height, Land og Folk reached a circulation of 130,000, and was the largest underground newspaper in Denmark throughout the German occupation. In respectively December 1941 and April 1942 the major bipartisan papers De Frie Danske and Frit Danmark followed. In all some 600 different underground papers were published in Denmark.

With the population having access to news from the United Kingdom and Sweden through radio, the underground press in Denmark focussed on opinion pieces until 1943, when relations between Danish authorities and the Germans deteriorated. The only paper established in wartime Denmark that is still being published is Information.

=== France ===
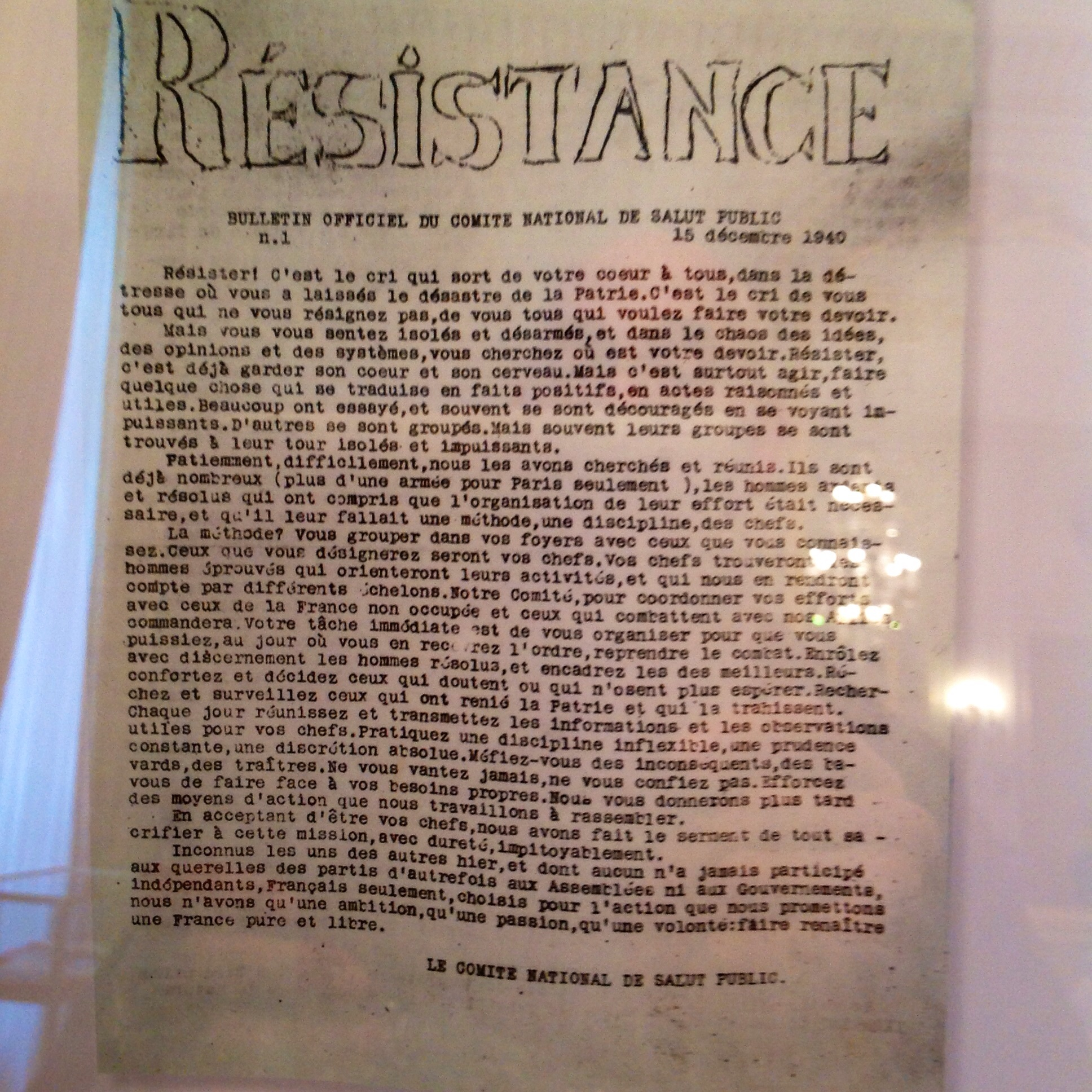
Résistance, one of France's first underground newspapers, from 15 December 1940

France was invaded and occupied after a disastrous military campaign in May–June 1940. Under the armistice agreement, the country was divided into two zones: an area in the northern half of the country (including Paris) under direct German military occupation and a "Free Zone" in the South ruled by the semi-independent Vichy regime under Marshal Philippe Pétain. Frustration and unrest in both parts led to the emergence of the French Resistance which, by 1942, had become a mass movement.

The first French underground newspapers emerged in opposition to German and Vichy control of French radio and newspapers. In the German-occupied zone, the first underground titles to emerge were Pantagruel and Libre France, which both began in Paris in October 1940. In Vichy France, the first title to emerge was Liberté in November 1940. Few produced issues for both German and Vichy zones, though Libération was an early exception. In early newspaper issues, individuals often wrote under a number of pseudonyms in the same issue to convey the impression that a team of individuals was working on a newspaper. Initially underground newspapers represented a wide range of political opinions but, by 1944, had generally converged in support of Gaullist Free French in the United Kingdom.

The four major clandestine newspapers during the German occupation were Défense de la France, Résistance, Combat and Libération. Défense de la France was founded by a group of Parisian students in the summer of 1941. After the invasion of the Soviet Union, these were joined by a number of communist publications including L'Humanité and Verité. These newspapers were anti-Nazi propaganda, but practiced propaganda themselves by misreporting events, and glorifying and enlarging Allied victories. The reporting in these newspapers was often subjective, as they aimed to capture and shape public opinion rather than accurately represent it. The extent to which underground newspapers actually affected French popular opinion under the occupation is disputed by historians.

A small number of underground presses were also active in printing illegal books and works of literature. The most notable example of this was Le Silence de la mer by Jean Bruller published illegally in Paris in 1942. Its publisher, Les Éditions de Minuit, became a successful commercial literary publisher in post-war France.

The National Library of France (Bibliothèque nationale de France, BnF) began a project in 2012 to digitise surviving French underground newspapers. By 2015, 1,350 titles had been uploaded on its Gallica platform.

=== Greece ===
Greece was invaded by Italy in October 1940, but not occupied until after the German invasion in April 1941. Greece was occupied and divided into German, Italian and Bulgarian zones and a Greek puppet government was created. Greek Resistance emerged rapidly. The left-leaning National Liberation Front (Ethniko Apeleftherotiko Metopo, or EAM) published the country's first underground newspaper, Forward (Embros), in January 1942.

A group of former army officers, organized into the Army of Enslaved Victors (Stratia Sklavomenon Nikiton) began publishing a newspaper called Great Greece (Megali Ellas). The Panhellenic Union of Fighting Youths (Panellínios Énosis Agonizómenon Néon, or PEAN) published an alternative newspaper called Glory (Doxa) in both German-occupied Athens and the Bulgarian-occupied Macedonia. The pre-war newspaper The Radical (Rizospastis), produced by the Communist Party of Greece, was produced as an underground publication. Other newspaper included Fighting Greece (Mahomeni Ellas).

=== Luxembourg ===
Luxembourg was invaded by Nazi Germany in May 1940 and was conquered in less than a day. The German occupation authority considered Luxembourgers, although largely trilingual in French, German and Luxembourgish, to be a Germanic people and thus suitable for annexation into Germany itself by 1942. A resistance emerged with the foundation of the Lëtzeburger Patriote Liga (LPL) in August 1940 and soon grew.

The first underground newspaper, Ons Hémecht (Our Homeland), was published by the LPL but soon ceased publication after its directors were arrested. The main newspaper of the occupation period was the De Freie Lötzeburger (The Free Luxembourger), also printed by the LPL and based on La Libre Belgique. It was printed in Belgium. Ons Hémecht was restarted by the De Freie Lötzeburger late in the war.

=== Netherlands ===
Fearing that Dutch exposure to Allied radio programming would turn the Dutch against them, the Nazis called for the confiscation of all radio transmitters soon after the country was occupied in May 1940. By May 1943, they had confiscated nearly 80 percent of Dutch radios, amounting to just over one million sets. With the Nazi grip on the media tightening, many Dutch households hid their radios, receiving illegal broadcasts from the BBC and Radio Oranje (Radio Orange) that kept them up to date on Allied forces and their accomplishments on the war front – and in some cases messages that helped them resist Nazi rule. Allied radio broadcasts were so important to the Dutch people that many people began building crystal radios. Crystal radios were fairly easy to build and could be made quickly in large quantities. Their main advantage was that they required no batteries and could only be heard by those operating them but were very hard to control or tune. During the Dutch famine (Hongerwinter) of 1944, many people smuggled crystal radios to farmers in exchange for fresh produce.

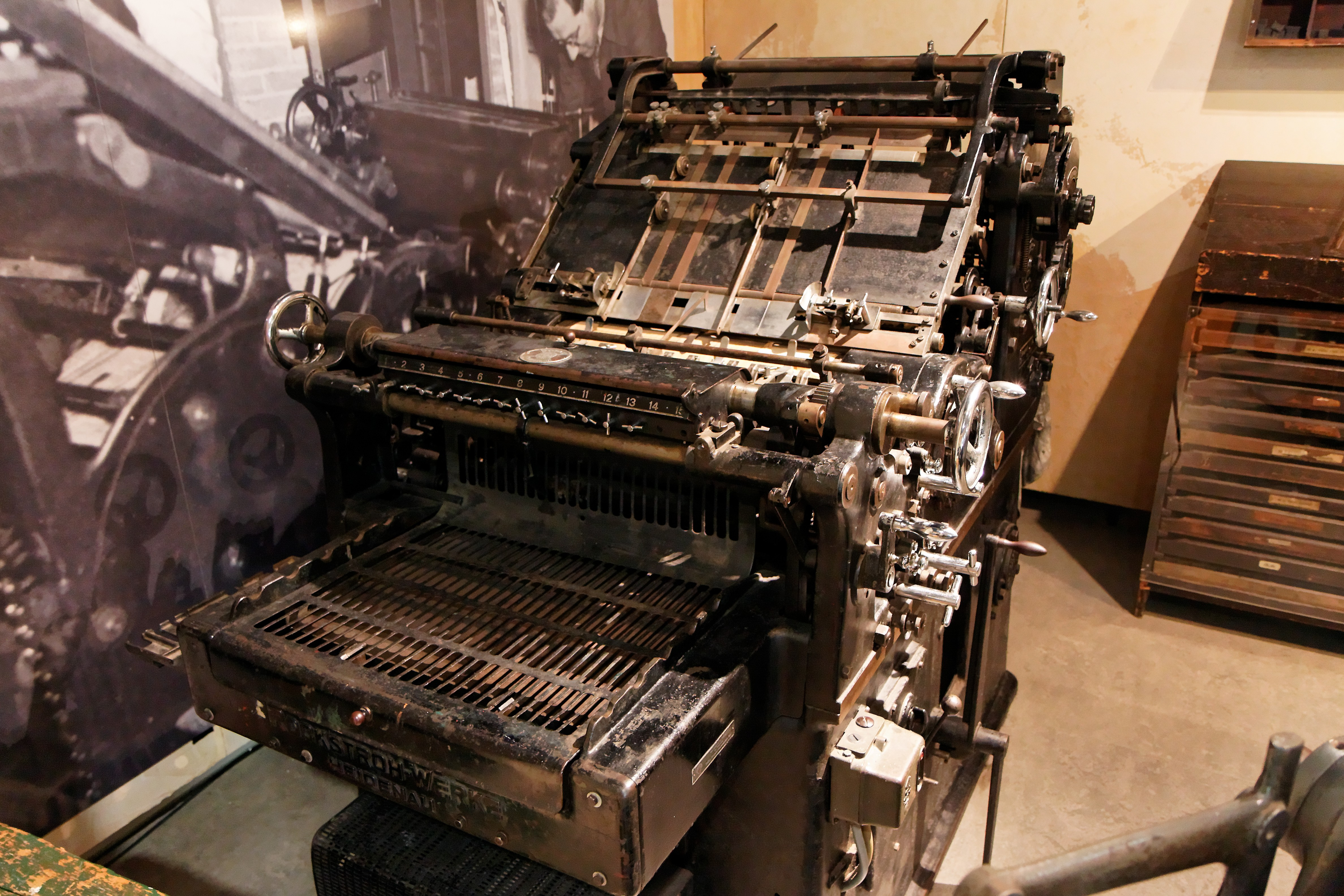
Specialist printing press used by the Dutch communist underground newspaper De Vonk, preserved at the Verzetsmuseum in Amsterdam

There were a number of underground Dutch newspapers, the first and most notable, however, was Het Parool (The Watchword). Het Parool was founded in February 1941 by Frans Goedhart, who went by the pseudonym "Pieter 't Hoen" (Peter the Chicken). The first issue of Het Parool (August 1941) saw a circulation of 6,000, a number that never significantly rose due to security issues. In 1943, Frans Goedhart was captured by Nazi officials and tried in a German court. To conceal his secret identity as Pieter 't Hoen, writers at Het Parool periodically published articles under his pseudonym. In August 1943, Goedhart was sentenced to death. He escaped three days before his execution, with the help of Dutch officials. Upon his escape, Goedhart returned to his position of editor at the newspaper Het Parool. Het Parool's main objective was to raise national moral and organize the Dutch people against Nazi rule. After the Germans began their occupation, working on an illegal newspaper was punishable by immediate jail time, and in the latter years of the war, death. Before the end of the war, four editors at Het Parool were sentenced to death, while two escaped to ally countries. Altogether, as many as 1,200 separate newspaper titles were produced by the Dutch resistance during the war. Collectively, the underground press provided a space for free debate about political and religious issues, as well as for planning for after the liberation.

=== Norway ===
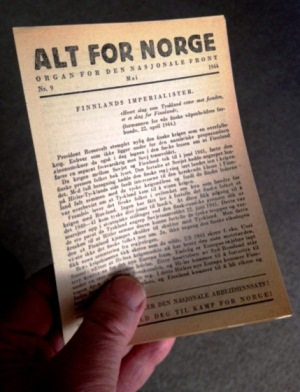
Alt for Norge (Everything for Norway), a minor newssheet produced by the Communist Party of Norway, from 1944

The first underground newspapers in occupied Norway were published by the nascent Norwegian resistance movement in the summer of 1940, soon after the conclusion of the Norwegian Campaign. The main purpose of the underground newspapers was to distribute news from BBC Radio, as well as messages and appeals from the Norwegian government in exile.

Some 300 underground newspapers were published in Norway during the war, the biggest of which was London-Nytt (London New), and 12,000 to 15,000 people were involved in their distribution. From the autumn of 1941, the Norwegian communists joined the underground press, publishing newspapers such as Friheten (Freedom).

In October 1942, the German authorities in Norway made it a capital crime to read underground newspapers. Of the people involved in the underground press in Norway, 3,000 to 4,000 were arrested by the Germans, of whom 62 were executed and a further 150 died as a consequence of their captivity.

=== Poland ===
There were over 1,000 underground newspapers; among the most important were the Biuletyn Informacyjny (News Bulletin) of Armia Krajowa and Rzeczpospolita (Republic or Commonwealth) of the Government Delegation for Poland. In addition to publication of news (from intercepted Western radio transmissions), there were hundreds of underground publications dedicated to politics, economics, education, and literature (for example, Sztuka i Naród (Art and Nation)). The highest recorded publication volume was an issue of Biuletyn Informacyjny printed in 43,000 copies; the average volume of larger publication was 1,000–5,000 copies. The Polish underground also published booklets and leaflets from imaginary anti-Nazi German organizations aimed at spreading disinformation and lowering morale among the Germans. Books were also sometimes printed. Other items were also printed, such as patriotic posters or fake German administration posters, ordering the Germans to evacuate Poland or telling Poles to register household cats.

The two largest underground publishers were the Bureau of Information and Propaganda of Armia Krajowa and the Government Delegation for Poland. Tajne Wojskowe Zakłady Wydawnicze (Secret Military Publishing House) of Jerzy Rutkowski (subordinated to the Armia Krajowa) was probably the largest underground publisher in the world. In addition to Polish titles, Armia Krajowa also printed false German newspapers designed to decrease morale of the occupying German forces (as part of Action N). The majority of Polish underground presses were located in occupied Warsaw; until the Warsaw Uprising in the summer of 1944 the Germans found over 16 underground printing presses (whose crews were usually executed or sent to concentration camps). The second largest center for Polish underground publishing was Kraków. There, writers and editors faced similar dangers: for example, almost the entire editorial staff of the underground satirical paper Na Ucho (In [Your] Ear) was arrested, and its chief editors executed in Kraków on 27 May 1944. (Na Ucho was the longest published Polish underground paper devoted to satire; 20 issues were published starting in October 1943.) The underground press was supported by a large number of activists; in addition to the crews manning the printing presses, scores of underground couriers distributed the publications. According to some statistics, these couriers were among the underground members most frequently arrested by the Germans.

== See also ==
- Tarnschriften – disguised publications in Nazi Germany
