= Wanda Traczyk-Stawska =

Polish social activist and World War II veteran (1927–2026)

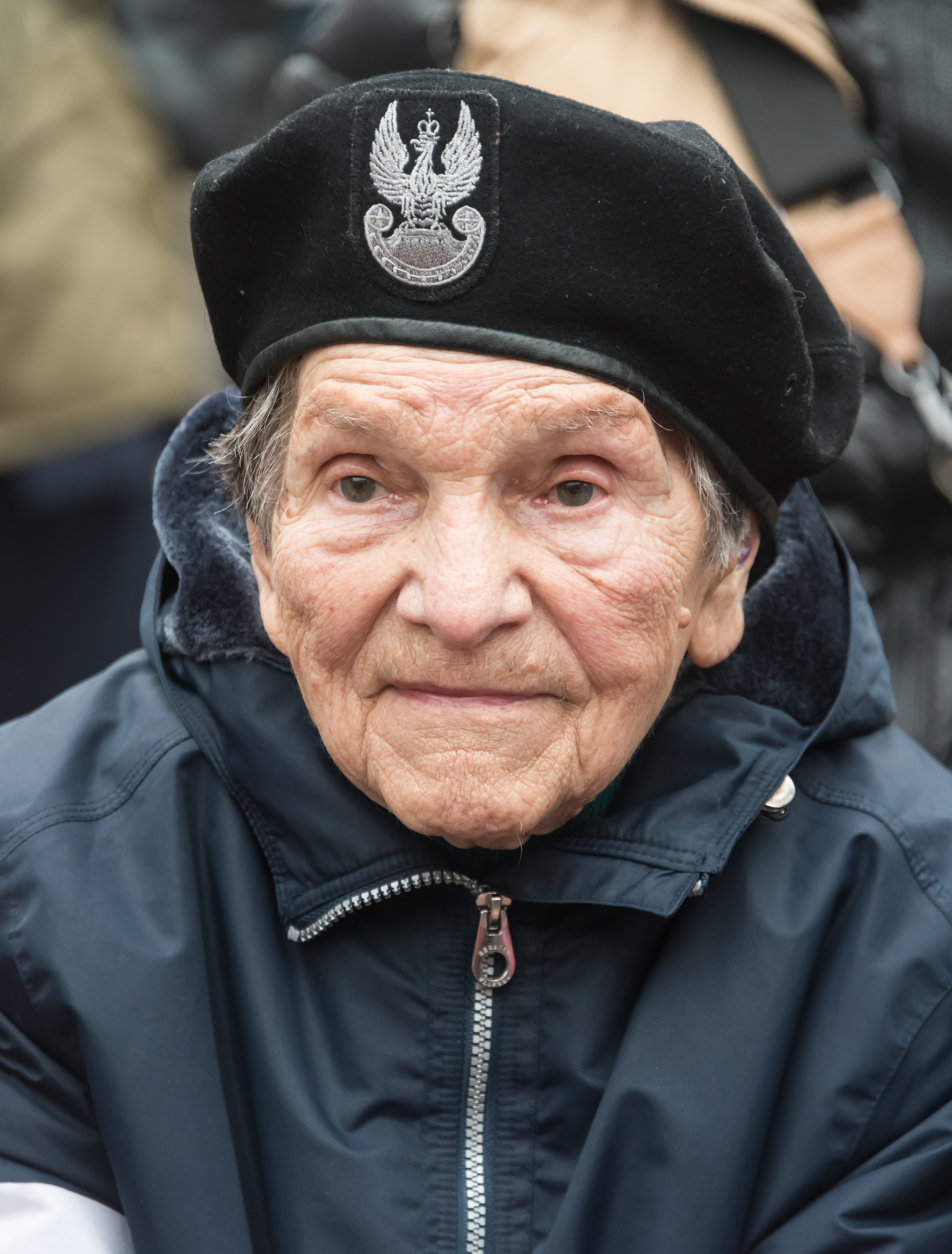
- Traczyk-Stawska in 2022
- Born: 7 April 1927; Warsaw, Poland
- Died: 18 August 2026 (aged 99); Warsaw, Poland
- Burial place: Evangelical Augsburg Cemetery, Warsaw
- Military career
- Allegiance: Home Army
- Branch: Home Army Headquarters; Unit VI of BiP; Covering Detachment of WZW
- Rank: Plutonowy
- Nicknames: Pączek, Atma
- Conflicts: World War II; Warsaw Uprising
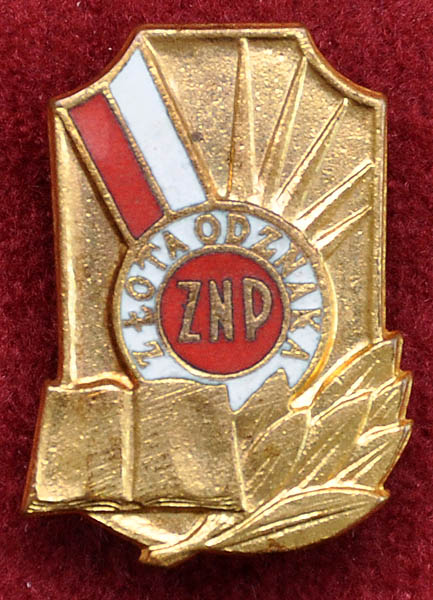
- Awards

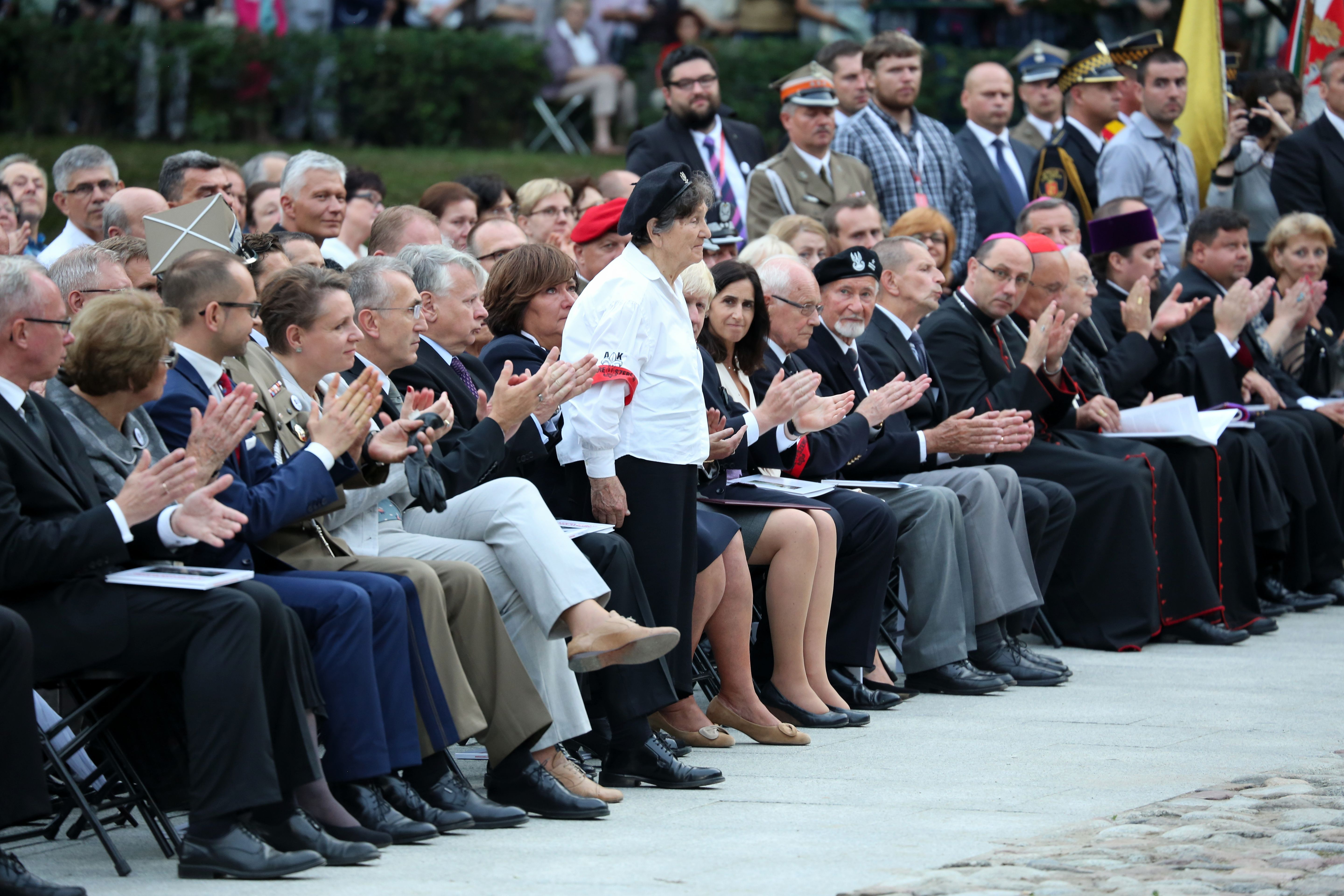
Wanda Traczyk-Stawska during the commemoration of the 70th anniversary of the Warsaw Uprising at the Polegli Niepokonani Monument in Warsaw (2014)

Wanda Traczyk-Stawska (7 April 1927 – 18 August 2026), ps. Pączek or Atma, was a Polish psychologist and social activist. She was involved in the Polish underground resistance movement during World War II, a soldier of the Home Army, a member of the Gray Ranks, a participant in the Warsaw Uprising, and chairperson of the Social Committee for the Cemetery of Warsaw Insurgents.

== Biography ==
Wanda Traczyk-Stawska was born in Warsaw, Poland on 7 April 1927, the daughter of Szczepan and Bronisława. She attended primary school no. 65 at 36 Białołęcka Street (currently 2 Bartnicza Street) in Bródno, from where, after three years, she moved to school no. 33 at 22 Grottgera Street in Mokotów. There, she belonged to the 42nd Żwirki i Wigury scout troop. Before the war she lived with her family in Dolna Street.

During the German occupation, since 1942, she was active in the independence conspiracy. As a member of the Gray Ranks she took part in minor sabotage and in Operation N, during which she delivered letters to informers warning them that if they did not stop their activities they would be sentenced to death.

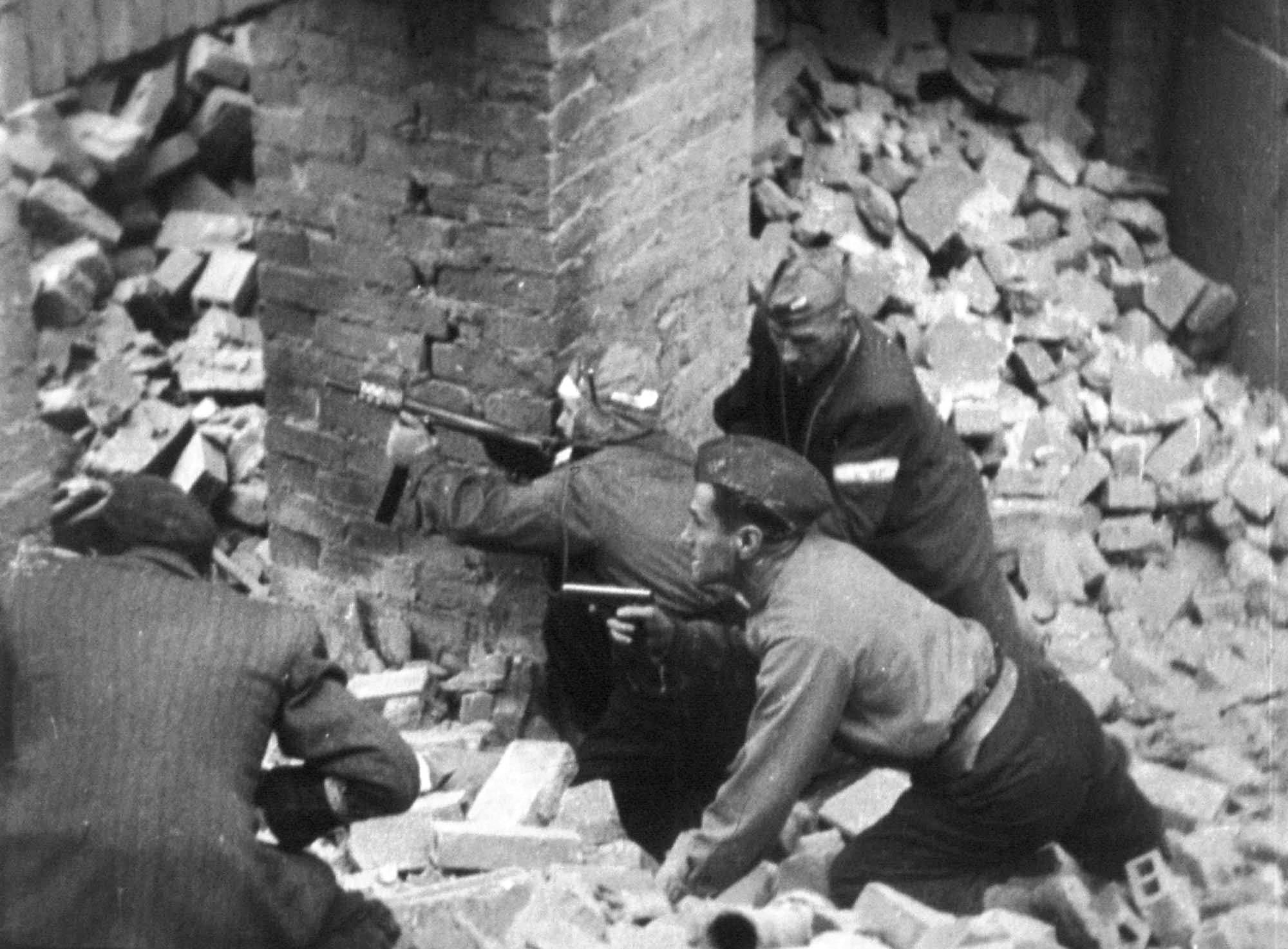
Wanda Traczyk with a Błyskawica submachine gun during the Warsaw Uprising (staged frame from an insurgent newsreel)

She took part in the Warsaw Uprising as a gunner and a liaison officer in the Covering Detachment of the Military Publishing Works (WZW) of the Bureau of Information and Propaganda of the Home Army Headquarters. It was the disposition unit of Antoni Chruściel ps. "Monter", directed to support the insurgent units in northern Śródmieście. She also fought in southern Śródmieście and Powiśle, among other things to hold the power plant. On September 6, 1944, she was seriously wounded on Smolna Street.

After the Uprising capitulation she was taken prisoner by the Germans; she was a prisoner of Stalag VIII-B, Stalag IV-B, Stalag IV-E, and Stalag VI-C.

In 1947, she returned to Poland. She graduated from the Faculty of Psychology at the University of Warsaw and started working at the Special School No. 6 for children with special needs in Praga. For many years she worked as a teacher at the Special Primary School No. 3 at 43 Ząbkowska Street. She was also responsible for finding the insurgents' graves in the city. She was the initiator of taking care of the Warsaw Insurgents Cemetery, she co-initiated the establishment of the 2nd October Remembrance Day for the Civilian Insurgents of Warsaw by the Parliament of the Polish Republic in 2015, and she initiated the construction of the memorial chamber in the park of the Warsaw Insurgents.

Traczyk-Stawska served as the chairwoman of the Social Committee for the Cemetery of Warsaw Insurgents at the World Association of Home Army Soldiers.

In 2018, she supported the protest of disabled people in the Sejm; she tried to meet with the participants, but was not allowed into the parliament building. During the 2020 Polish presidential election, she appeared in material recorded for Rafał Trzaskowski's campaign. In October 2020, she supported the protest against the tightening of abortion laws in Poland and protested against the use of the symbol of Fighting Poland by Jarosław Kaczyński during his statement. On 10 October 2021, she took part and spoke during a protest at the Castle Square in Warsaw after the Constitutional Tribunal's ruling on the superiority of the Constitution of Poland over European Union law.

She was the subject of the documentary film directed by Marianna Bukowski titled Portrait of a Soldier and the book Błyskawica. The story of Wanda Traczyk-Stawska - a soldier of the Warsaw Uprising.

Traczyk-Stawska died in Warsaw on 18 August 2026, at the age of 99. Her funeral took place on 31 August 2026. The funeral Mass was celebrated at Holy Cross Church, Warsaw, and was presided over by Cardinal Kazimierz Nycz, with the homily delivered by Archbishop Adrian Galbas. She was subsequently buried at the Evangelical Augsburg Cemetery, Warsaw.

== Awards and decorations ==

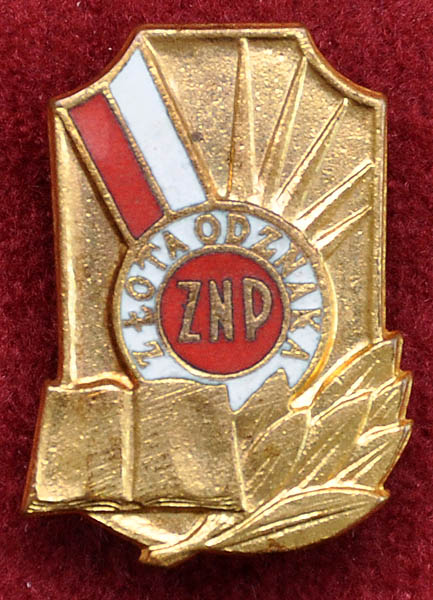

- Cross of Valour
- Cross of Merit on the Order of Merit of the Federal Republic of Germany (2015).
- Honorary citizenship of the city of Warsaw (2017)
- "Stool" of "Gazeta Wyborcza" (2015, for restoring the memory of the Warsaw Insurgents' cemetery in Wola)
- Gold Badge of Polish Teachers' Union (ZNP) (2019)
- "Crown of Equality" Award in the "Social Commitment" category, awarded in the plebiscite of the Campaign Against Homophobia for involvement in the fight for equal rights for the LGBT community (2020)
- Honorary Award within the 9th edition of the Jan Rodowicz "Anoda" Award (2021, awarded by the Warsaw Uprising Museum).
- Winner of the 2021 Warsaw Woman of the Year competition (2021)
