= Hanna Stadnik =

Polish activist (1929–2020)

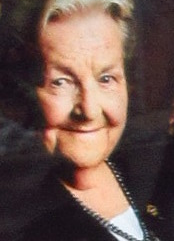
Hanna Stadnik

Hanna Stadnik (23 February 1929 – 1 December 2020) was a Polish social worker, women's rights activist, and veteran of the Polish resistance movement in World War II. In 1944, at the age of 15-years old, Stadnik participated in the Warsaw Uprising against Nazi German occupation. She was imprisoned by German authorities for the duration of the war, but later received numerous awards and recognitions for her role in the uprising.

Stadnik later served as a longtime Vice President of the World Association of Home Army Soldiers (ŚZŻAK). In September 2020, Stadnik was named acting President of the ŚZŻAK, a position she held until her death on 1 December 2020.

== Biography ==
Stadnik was born on 23 February 1929, in Warsaw, Poland.

Nazi Germany invaded and occupied Poland, including Warsaw, in 1939. In 1942, Stadnik began working for the Polish underground when she was 13-years old. She received medical training and smuggled documents and weapons across Warsaw from 1942 to 1944.

Hanna Stadnik was just 15-years old at the onset of the Warsaw Uprising, a major revolt led by the Home Army and the Polish resistance to free the city from German occupation, on 1 August 1944. Stadnik joined the Uprising beginning on the first day of the revolt as a member of the Home Army's "Baszta" regiment under the nickname "Hanka". She served as a paramedic, liaison, and weapons smuggler during the fighting, mainly in the city's Mokotów district. Stadnik and her colleagues were eventually forced to surrender. She was imprisoned in German camps at Dulag 121 and Skierniewice.

Following the end of World War II and her release from German imprisonment, Hanna Stadnik completed high school and enrolled at the University of Warsaw. However, she was forced to leave the university after two years for concealing her past membership in Home Army and the Warsaw Uprising by Poland's new communist dictatorship. Stadnik worked as a social worker during her career while participating in veterans organizations.

Stadnik served as a longtime Vice President of the World Association of Home Army Soldiers (ŚZŻAK), an organization for veterans of the Home Army. In 2020, ŚZŻAK President Leszek Żukowski resigned from the position, effective 18 September 2020. Hanna Stadnik succeeded him as the acting President of ŚZŻAK, a position she held until her death on 1 December 2020.

She remained active in social and political causes until the end of her life. In 2016, Stadnik and her colleagues, including psychologist Wanda Traczyk-Stawska, became vocal public supporters of the nationwide All-Poland Women's Strike. She also publicly criticized Deputy Prime Minister Jarosław Kaczyński for invoking the Warsaw Uprising for political purposes. Most recently, Stadnik took part in the October–December 2020 Polish protests, less than one month before her death, in response to a Constitutional Tribunal ruling which restricted abortion in Poland.

Hanna Stadnik died in Warsaw on 1 December 2020, at the age of 91, from COVID-19. Her death was announced by the Warsaw Uprising Museum.

== Awards and recognitions ==
- Cross of Merit of the Order of Merit of the Federal Republic of Germany (2015) - Awarded by German President Joachim Gauck
- Cross of Independence (2013) - Awarded by Polish President Bronisław Komorowski
- Partisan Cross
- Silver Cross of Merit
- Warsaw Uprising Cross
- Medal for Warsaw
- Badge of Distinction - ŚZŻAK
