= Operation Antyk =

Operation Antyk (Antyk being an acronym for the Polish phrase Akcja Antykomunistyczna, "Anti-Communist Operation"), also known as Department R, was a complex of counter-propaganda activities of Polish resistance movement organisation Home Army, directed against pro-Soviet and pro-communist circles in Polish society, mostly members of the Polish Workers' Party. The operation was initiated by Office Antyk of the Home Army’s Bureau of Information and Propaganda. Begun in November 1943, it was directed by Tadeusz Żenczykowski.

Operation Antyk was a twin to the Home Army’s earlier and more famous counter-propaganda activity, Operation N.

== Beginnings ==
After creation of the pro-Soviet Polish Workers Party (January 5, 1942), communist activists began propaganda attacks aimed at the agency of the Government in Exile, the Government Delegation for Poland, and its armed wing, the Home Army. Headquarters of the Home Army, together with the Delegation, decided to found special departments called “K”, whose tasks was to collect counter-propaganda materials, influence the propaganda in underground press, also inspire activities of anticommunist political parties. However, these were not enough, and on October 26, 1943, the Home Political Representation created Social Anticommunist Committee (SKA), which was supposed to neutralize activities of the Polish Workers Party.

== Objectives ==
The Social Anticommunist Committee was directly linked with Office Antyk of the Home Army’s Bureau of Information and Propaganda, created in November 1943. Also, some propaganda activities were carried out by the Department I of the Government Delegation, as well as the underground press. In late 1943 and early 1944, several Local Social Anticommunist Committees were created. The main task of the Operation Antyk was to show the nation lies of the Communist propaganda, and to raise awareness of the real purpose of the Soviets, which was to deprive Poland of its independence. Therefore, in underground papers, brochures, and leaflets, plans of the Soviet Union were frequently described.

== Activities ==
Operation Antyk brought out, among others, a weekly called Glos Ludu (People's Voice), which was targeted at the inhabitants of the countryside. The magazine's publisher, the Bureau of Information and Propaganda, was not mentioned in the headline, because the operation was top secret, even in the structures of the Home Army.

People's Voice was a radical anticommunist magazine, with such articles, as:

- Soviet Fifth Column,
- Brown Hitlerism-Red Stalinism,
- PPR - Soviet Agenture,
- Russia - Always the Same,
- PPR is creating the Soviets in Poland,
- Bataliony Chlopskie condemn the PPR.

Also, Soviet Union was attacked by using the analogies to the Nazi Germany, with such expressions, as NKVD - Gestapo, or Hitlerism - Bolshevism. At the same time, some of the Communist proposals for postwar Poland, such as land reform, were left untouched, as these were also supported by the publishers of the magazine.

Another publication was a biweekly Wolnosc Robotnicza (Laborer's Freedom), published since November 1943, with circulation of some 7 000. It contained articles similar to those published in the People's Voice, but also current information from the frontlines, as well as anti-Nazi propaganda.

Also, several brochures and leaflets were printed, in which history of Polish - Soviet relations was summarized. One of these brochures was titled Polish - Soviet Conflict in documents and official utterances. February 1943 - February 1944, another one was titled Red Targowica. Leaflets, with titles such as We will not end up in a kolkhoz, presented totalitarian face of the Soviet regime. In February 1944, after creation of the parliament-like, Communist political body State National Council, a leaflet was published, signed by 23 parties and political organizations. It was entitled A response to the KRN's manifesto. Also, on the walls of several buildings in occupied Poland, slogans were painted, such as: PPR - traitors, PPR - the enemy, PPR - paid servants of Russia.

Antyk should not be confused with the Social Anti-Communist Committee (Społeczny Komitet Antykomunistyczny, SKA), an organization set up by the Home Political Representation on 26 October 1943, headed by Franciszek Białas. Social Anti-Communist Committee coordinated anti-communist propaganda activity among the main political groups and organizations of the Polish Underground State; it also cooperated closely with AK's Operation Antyk.

=== Antisemitic propaganda ===
Antyk was led by operatives who held strong anti-communist and anti-Jewish views, including the zydokomuna stereotype. The perceived association between Jews and communists was actively reinforced by its publications, including its initial reports that "tended to conflate communists with Jews, dangerously disseminating the notion that Jewish loyalties were to Soviet Russia and communism rather than to Poland," and which repeated the notion that antisemitism was a "useful tool in the struggle against Soviet Russia."

== Results ==
The results of Operation Antyk were negligible, since most propaganda efforts of the Home Army's Bureau of Information and Propaganda were concentrated on anti-Nazi activities. Among around 150 workers of the Bureau, only some 20 were involved in Antyk, and the expenses were around 4% of total budget of the Bureau. Operation Antyk was terminated in the end of July 1944, just after nine months of existence.

== See also ==
- Small sabotage
- Operation N
