= Tadeusz Żenczykowski =

Polish lawyer, activist, and soldier (1907–1997)

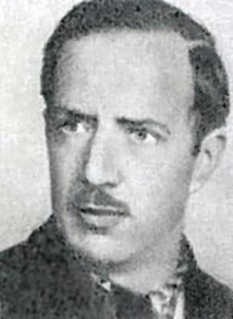
- Born: 2 January 1907; Warsaw, Warsaw Governorate, Congress Poland, Russian Empire
- Died: 30 March 1997 (aged 90); London, England, United Kingdom
- Military career
- Allegiance: Poland
- Branch: Home Army
- Commands: Bureau of Information and Propaganda
- Conflicts: Siege of Warsaw (1939), Warsaw Uprising
- Other work: Author and deputy chief of Polish section of Radio Free Europe

Tadeusz Żenczykowski, pseudonym Kania, Kowalik and Zawadzki (2 January 1907 – 30 March 1997) was a Polish lawyer, political activist and soldier in the Armia Krajowa (Home Army) during World War II, taking part in the Warsaw Uprising of 1944. Immediately after the war, he was a member of the anti-communist conspiracy in Poland. In 1945, he emigrated and became a journalist and deputy chief of the Polish Section of Radio Free Europe, historian and publicist.

== Early life ==
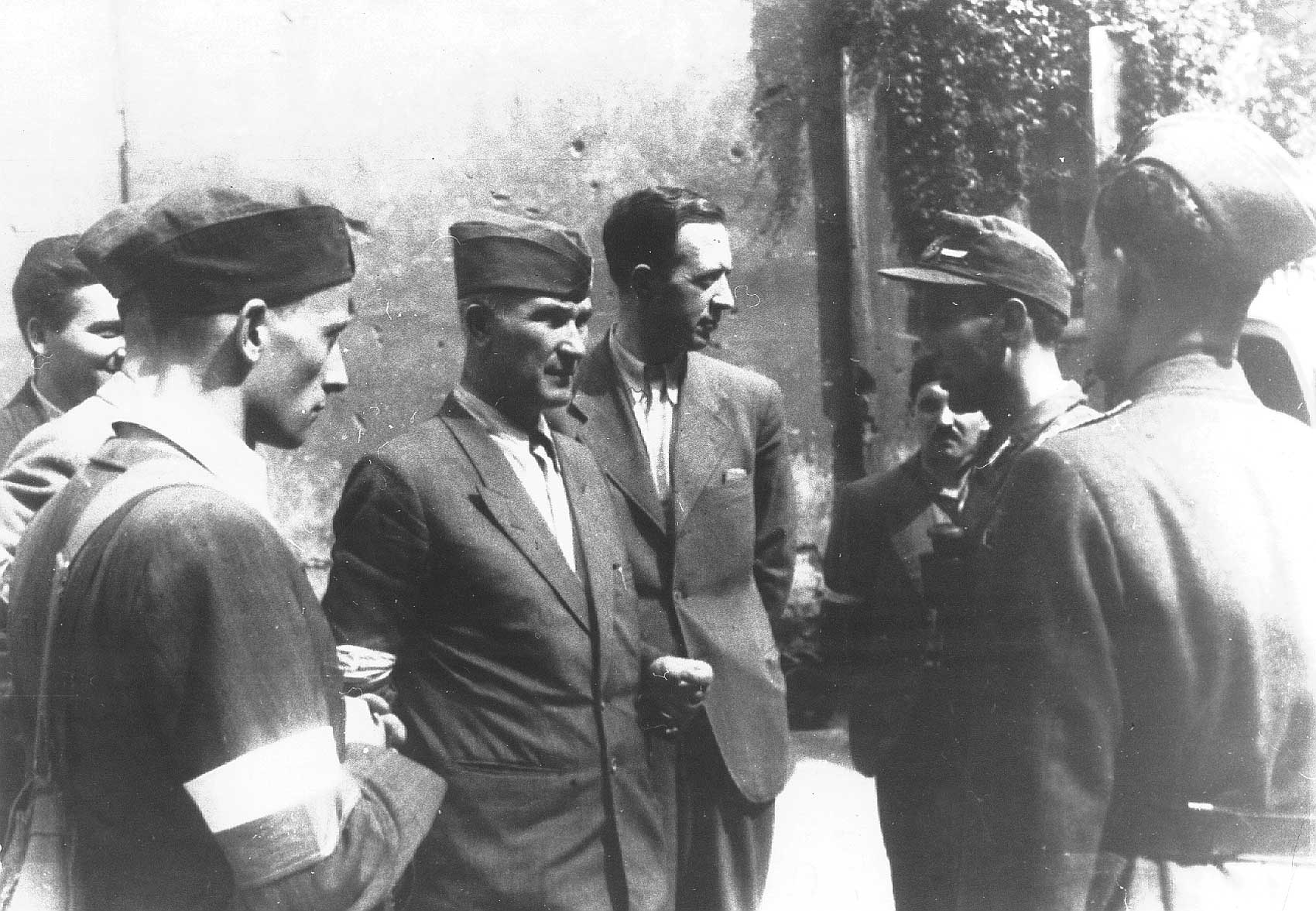
General Antoni Chruściel (pseudonym "Monter") (center) and officers of the Bureau of Information and Propaganda of the headquarters of Armia Krajowa, in the yard of the main post office in Warsaw Insurgents Square (then Napoleon Square) during the Warsaw Uprising. From left to right: Zygmunt Ziółek (pseudonym "Sawa"), Jan Rzepecki ("Wolski"). obscured by Lech Sadowski ("Wasyl") in the left foreground, General Chruściel, Żenczykowski and three others to the right.

In 1922, Tadeusz Żenczykowski became a member of the Riflemen's Association. He was one of leaders of Związek Polskiej Młodzieży Demokratycznej (Association of Polish Democratic Youth). From 1938, he was a member of the Polish parliament (Sejm) as a member of the parliamentary group Camp of National Unity (OZN).

== Military career ==
In September 1939, Żenczykowski took part in the defence of Warsaw. After escaping from German captivity, he became an organiser and president of the conspiracy organisation Związek Odbudowy Rzeczypospolitej (ZOR) (Union for the Reconstruction of the Commonwealth). Beginning 1940, he worked for the Bureau of Information and Propaganda of the Headquarters of Armia Krajowa (Home Army). He was chief of the Action "N" (anti-German subversive propaganda), while from 1943 he headed the Action "Antyk" (anti-Soviet propaganda), as well as of "Rój" – preparation of insurgent propaganda. He took part in the Warsaw Uprising as chief of propaganda of Armia Krajowa. After the failure of the uprising, he was captured by the Germans.

== After 1945 ==
After his liberation, Żenczykowski became editor of an underground anti-communist periodical Głos Wolności (Voice of Freedom) in Poland under communist rule. In November 1945, he left Poland and remained active in politics and publicity. During 1954–1975, he was editor, then deputy chief of the Polish Section of Radio Free Europe. He was a member of the Council of Trustees of the Polska Fundacja Kulturalna (Polish Cultural Fund) in London. For many years, he was contributor to the Dziennik Polski i Dziennik Żołnierza (Polish Daily and Soldier's Daily) newspaper in London. Żenczykowski was the author of many historical works, including two volumes of his historical study on the initial period of communist-ruled Poland in 1944/1945, entitled Polska Lubelska 1944 (The Lublin Poland of 1944) and Dramatyczny rok 1945 (The Dramatic Year 1945). He was decorated with the Order of the White Eagle. in 1996, as well as the order Virtuti Militari.

He was a controversial figure because of his activities. Stanisław Mackiewicz In his journalism called him ''ozone Goebbels''.

== Books ==
- Generał Grot u kresu walki (General "Grot" at the end of his fight), Wydawnictwo Polonia, Londyn, 1983
- Polska lubelska 1944 (The Lublin Poland of 1944), Editions Spotkania, Warszawa 1990;
- Samotny bój Warszawy. Pisma historyczne (The Lonely Fight of Warsaw. Historical Writings), Wydawnictwo LTW, 2005 r., ISBN 83-88736-69-8;
- Dramatyczny rok 1945 (The Dramatic Year 1945), Wydawnictwo LTW, 2005 r., ISBN 83-88736-74-4;
- Edward Raczyński, Tadeusz Żenczykowski Od Genewy do Jałty. Rozmowy radiowe (From Geneva to Yalta. Radio Talks), Towarzystwo Naukowe Katolickiego Uniwersytetu Lubelskiego, 1991 r., ISBN 83-85291-19-9;

== See also ==
- Bureau of Information and Propaganda
- Operation N
- Operation Antyk
- Radio Free Europe
