= Michał Rutkowski =

Polish economist

- Born: October 20, 1959 (age 66); Warsaw, Poland

Academic background
- Education: Warsaw School of Economics

Academic work
- Discipline: Macroeconomics, Labor Economics
- School or tradition: New classical macroeconomics
- Institutions: World Bank, Warsaw School of Economics, Centre for Labour Economics and the Centre for Economic Performance at London School of Economics
- Notable ideas: path-breaking pension reform package in Poland; pensions, labor markets and social assistance reforms in 28 countries of Central and Eastern Europe and former Soviet Union, as well as in Turkey
- Website: Information at IDEAS / RePEc

Michał Rutkowski (born 1959) is a Polish economist and a World Bank Regional Director for Human Development (Education, Health and Social Protection) in the Europe and Central Asia region of the World Bank. Before July 1, 2023, he was Global Director for Social Protection, and Jobs in the World Bank. Before this position, he was Director for Multilateral Organizations (2015–16), and earlier he was World Bank Country Director for the Russian Federation and a Resident Representative in Moscow (2012–15).

He is a former Director for human development (education, health and social protection) in the South Asia region of the World Bank. He is the highest-ranked Polish official at the World Bank headquarters in Washington, DC, and also a former director of the Office for Social Security Reform in the Government of Poland (1996–97), as well as a co-author of the design of the new Polish pension system.

== Education ==
Rutkowski was born on October 20, 1959, in Warsaw, Poland. He was the son of Jerzy Rutkowski, an officer of Polish Home Army and a manager of the largest covert printing house during Nazi occupation and Warsaw Uprising.

Rutkowski attended the Warsaw School of Economics (MSc 1982, PhD 1987), with post-graduate studies at the London School of Economics (1989–90) and Harvard Business School (1999).

== Career ==
Before joining the World Bank in 1990, Rutkowski was an assistant professor at the Warsaw School of Economics and did research work in the area of labor economics, macroeconomics, education, business development and productivity in the Centre for Labour Economics and the Centre for Economic Performance at the London School of Economics.

As a member of the secretariat of the Consultative Economic Council to the Polish government he also advised on early issues of economic and social transition to a market economy in Poland. He was also involved in interdisciplinary development endeavors as a member of the Polish Association for the Club of Rome and the British Association for the Club of Rome.

At the World Bank during the period 1990–96, he initially worked on public finance issues in Tanzania and economic and social consequences of mass migration in China. From 1992 onwards he focused, however, on economic and social transition to a market economy in Central and Eastern Europe and former Soviet Union, with a particular emphasis on labor market adjustments and social security system reforms.

Before joining the Polish government on leave from the World Bank in 1996, he was closely associated with early work on pension reforms in the Baltic States, Ukraine and Bulgaria, as well as with the reforms of the fiscal federalism in the Russian Federation (see "Federal Transfers in Russia and their Impact on Regional Revenues and Incomes", with Ph. Le Houerou, Comparative Economic Studies, 1996 (vol. XXXVIII), No. 2/3 (Summer/Fall), pp. 21–44).

During the period 1996–97, Rutkowski led the team of Polish reformers that prepared a path-breaking pension reform package in Poland. The reform entailed a move away from a traditional pay-as-you-go defined-benefit pension system towards a modern and self-sustainable system based on principles of defined contributions and partial pre-funding. With strong support of the Plenipotentiaries for Pension Reform (Andrzej Bączkowski and Jerzy Hausner) and ministers of finance (Grzegorz Kołodko and Marek Belka) the first laws of the reform package were passed in 1997, and the second batch in 1998 (with Ewa Lewicka as the Plenipotentiary, Leszek Balcerowicz as the minister of finance, and Marek Góra as Rutkowski's successor as director of the Office for Social Security Reform) to clear the way for the new pension reform to start on January 1, 1999.

From 1998 to 2004, when he was back at the World Bank as sector manager for social protection, Rutkowski led a team of professionals working on pensions, labor markets and social assistance reforms in 28 countries of Central and Eastern Europe and former Soviet Union, as well as in Turkey. During this period a wave of social security reforms swept Central and Eastern Europe, including reforms in Latvia, Estonia, Slovak Republic, Bulgaria, Croatia, Rumunia and Turkey.

From 2004-2008, Rutkowski was director for human development in the Middle East and North Africa region of the World Bank with his team focusing closely on education reforms, strengthening health systems and expanding and modernizing social security coverage in a volatile region.

== Works ==
Rutkowski has also edited and authored books and articles on subjects of social security and labor markets, including:

- a first comprehensive review of labor markets in transition economies "Labor Markets: Wages and Employment" (with R. Jackman) [in:] "Labor Market and Social Policy in Central and Eastern Europe", Oxford University Press 1994
- World Development Report 1995 on labor markets (member of the core writing team), "Pension Reform in Europe: Progress and Process" (with R. Holzmann and M. Orenstein), World Bank 2003 and
- "Pensions" (with N. Barr) [in:] "Labor Market and Social Policy in Central and Eastern Europe", World Bank 2005.

His current public policy reform interests include social security coverage, political economy of social reforms, and managing public policy change.
