= Ewa Pohoska =

Polish writer and anti-Nazi resistance fighter (1918–1944)

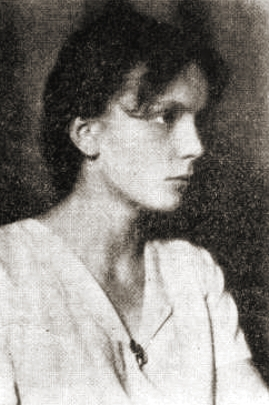
- Ewa Pohoska
- Born: 19 July 1918; Warszawa
- Died: 11 February 1944 (aged 25); Warszawa
- Citizenship: Polish
- Occupations: playwright, poet, journalist, soldier

Ewa Pohoska (19 July 1918 – 11 February 1944) was a Polish poet, playwright, journalist and soldier of the Home Army.

She was the daughter of Jan Pohoski and Hanna Pohoska née Rzepecka, granddaughter of Kazimierz Rzepecki and niece of Jan Rzepecki.

Her play Schyłek amonitów was published in 1944 in Droga. In 2025, her personal journal was published, entitled "...bez dziennika się widać nie obejdzie".
