= Sylwester Braun =

Polish photographer

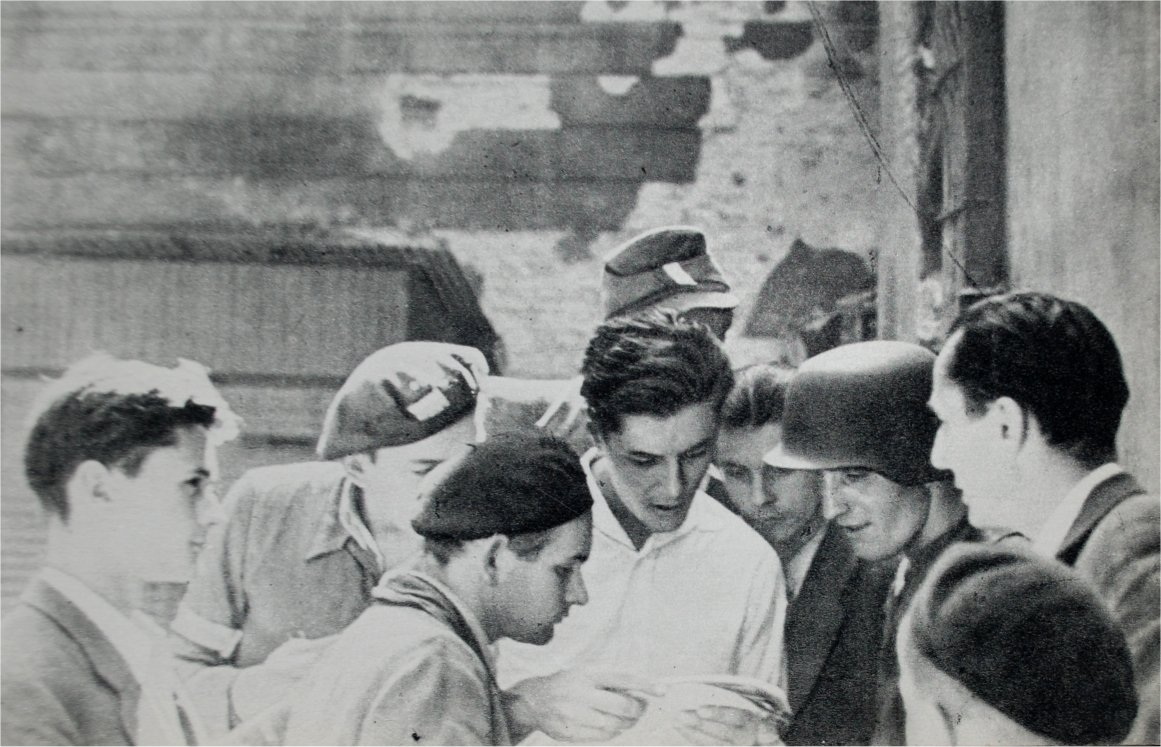
Sylwester Braun in August 1944

Sylwester Braun (code-name "Kris", 1 January 1909, Warsaw – 9 February 1996, Warsaw) was a Polish photographer, Home Army officer. He is known for taking photos during the Nazi Occupation of Poland and the Warsaw Uprising.

Braun was born on 1 January 1909 in Warsaw. During the Warsaw Uprising he took 3000 photographs of battles, people, destruction, and everyday life in the fighting city. Generally he operated in the Śródmieście district. After the capitulation of Warsaw, he escaped from the city, returning in January 1945 to retrieve his negatives. After that he fled to Sweden, and in 1964 he immigrated to the United States. In 1981 he delivered archives of his photographs to the Historical Museum of Warsaw. Sylwester Braun died in Warsaw on 2 February 1996.

== See also ==
- Bureau of Information and Propaganda of Armia Krajowa
