= Tajne Wojskowe Zakłady Wydawnicze =

Secret printing and publishing house of the Polish Underground State

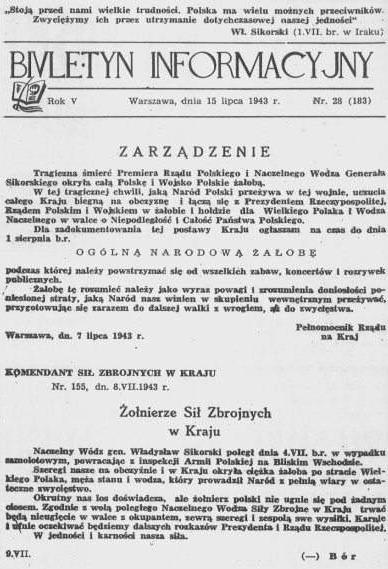
Polish Underground State Information Bulletin, 15 July 1943, reports death of Gen. Sikorski and orders a national day of mourning

Tajne Wojskowe Zakłady Wydawnicze (translated as the Secret Military Printing Works or the Secret Military Publishing House) was the secret printing and publishing house of the Polish Underground State in Warsaw, Nazi-occupied Poland. It was run, from its creation in late 1940 to disbandment in early 1945, by Jerzy Rutkowski of Bureau of Information and Propaganda of the Polish resistance (Armia Krajowa).

TWZW was likely the largest underground publisher in the world.

== History ==
First underground press of TWZW started operating in Warsaw in autumn 1940. Before that period, underground presses had to rely on small, amateurish printing presses. TWZW revolutionized the underground printing scene in occupied Poland, by building new underground presses, and organizing the entire network. By early 1944 TWZW had twelve underground centers, including eight printing presses, as well as a bookbinding center, an offset printing center, a foreign-language publication center, and a chemigraphy (zincography) center. Most of its operations were located in Warsaw. In summer 1944 several centers of TWZW were discovered by the German occupiers. During the Warsaw Uprising in late summer of 1944, remaining TWZW operations in Warsaw went public as Wojskowe Zakłady Wydawnicze (Military Publishing House). Early on during the uprising personnel of TWZW attacked and took control of several large, official printing presses in Warsaw. The last publication of Warsaw TWZW was the 102nd issue of Biuletyn Informacyjny, printed on the night of 3 to 4 October, a day after the insurgents surrendered. TWZW was officially disbanded in January 1945 along with the entire Armia Krajowa.

TWZW were mentioned by general Stefan Rowecki Grot in his order 104/43, thanking them for their work.

== Operations ==
Der Klabautermann, 3 January 1943—an Action N periodical for Germans. Left: Death. Center: Hitler. Right: Himmler.

Warsaw Uprising poster: "Fighting Fires - You Defend Warsaw. Firefighting is a Military Operation".

The twelve centers of TZWZ were named W-1 to W-12 (W for warsztat, Polish for workshop).

- TZWZ, subordinate to Bureau of Information and Propaganda, was headed by Jerzy Rutkowski pseudonym "Michał Kmita"
  - Secretary – Maria Rutkowska-Mierzejewska pseudonym "Janka"
  - Section of Administration – headed by Igor Telechun pseudonym "Łukasz"
  - Section of Supplies – headed by Aleksander Wąsowski pseudonym "Józef"
  - Section of Technical Matters – headed by Stefan Berent pseudonym "Steb"
  - Cell of Drawings – headed by Stanisław Kunstetter pseudonym "Krzysztof"
  - Printing house W 1 – headed by Czesław Korwin-Piotrowski pseudonym "Karol". Hidden in private villa. Major printing center of high-quality German language disinformation texts for Action N. Operated from autumn 1940. Discovered by Germans in March 1944.
  - Printing house W 2 – headed by Jerzy Paszyc pseudonym "Stefan". Hidden in a fruit shop and cafe. Printed brochures and books.
  - Printing house W 3 – headed by Władysław Pomorski pseudonym "Jerzy". Hidden in a carpenter's workshop.
  - Printing house W 4 – headed by Michał Wojewódzki pseudonym"Andrzej". Hidden in a basement of a former gliders factory. One of the largest printing presses, capable of printing over 40,000 of a newspaper issue. Discovered by Germans in June 1944.
  - Printing house W 5 – headed by Czesław Mierzejewski pseudonym"Marek". Hidden in a family home, it was the major chemigraphy center, where many fake documents of Polish resistance were created.
  - Printing house W 6 – headed by Jerzy Mierzejewski pseudonym "Jacek". Operated shortly before forced to evacuate.
  - Printing house W 7 – headed by Michał Wojewódzki pseudonym "Andrzej". Hidden in a toy workshop. Printed many foreign-language publications. Discovered by Germans.
  - Printing house W 8 – headed by Jerzy Paszyc pseudonym "Stefan". Hidden in a woodmill shack, was discovered before it started operations.
  - Printing house W 9 – headed by Marian Jędrzejczyk pseudonym"Kazimierz". Bookbinding center.
  - Printing house W 10 – headed by Stanisław Stopczyk pseudonym "Antoni". Never finished before the Warsaw Uprising begun.
  - Printing house W 11 – small reserve printing press. Discovered in April 1944 by the Germans.
  - Printing house W 13 - planned as the largest underground printing press ever, with equipment purchased abroad, never finished before the Warsaw Uprising begun.

By late 1943 and early 1944, when TWZW was in its peak strength, monthly production of TWZW included about 250,000 newspapers and magazines, 65,500 brochures and 120,000 leaflets. It is estimated that during its operation, TWZW produced 10-20 million newspaper and magazine issues, and about a million each of brochures, leaflets and other prints (such as posters). Its publications were distributed throughout occupied Poland, and in some instances, even abroad. TWZW employed about 50 people full-time (many of them women), many more volunteers (particularly to distribute its publications), and consumed monthly about 5 tons of paper (bought on the black market). TWZW was likely the largest underground publisher in the world.

Over the years many people involved with TWZW were arrested by the Germans, some were imprisoned, others, executed.

TWZW had its own logo: a szabla (Polish saber) on an open book.

Notable publications of TWZW:

- underground newspapers: Biuletyn Informacyjny, Wiadomości Polskie
- books: Kamienie na szaniec of Aleksander Kamiński (first edition), Dywizjon 303 of Arkady Fiedler (first edition in Poland)

== See also ==
- Action N
- Polish underground press (bibuła)
