= World Association of Home Army Soldiers =

World Association of Home Army Soldiers Światowy Związek Żołnierzy Armii Krajowej
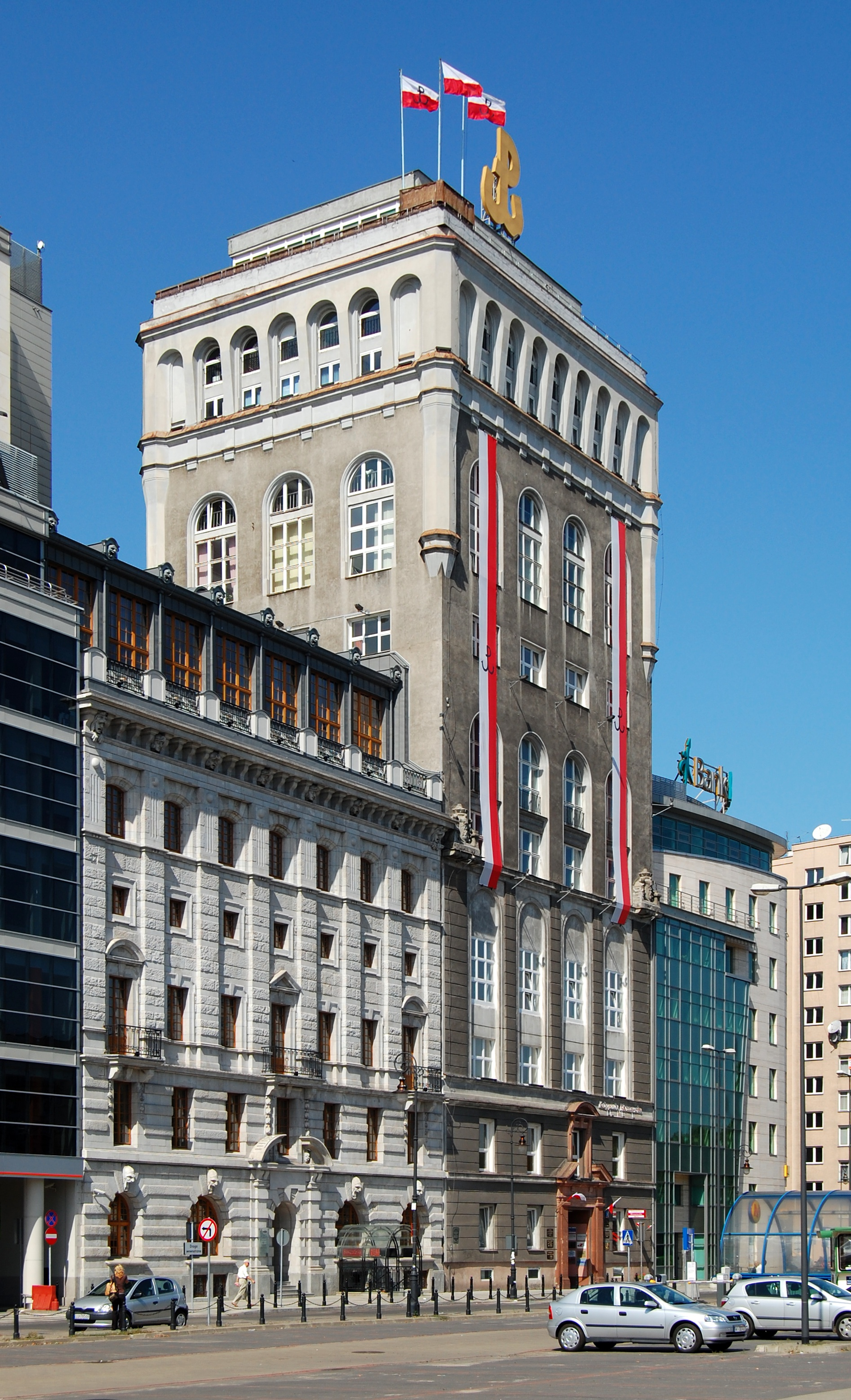
- ŚZŻAK headquarters are located in the PAST Building in Warsaw
- Abbreviation: ŚZŻAK
- Formation: 1989; 37 years ago
- Type: INGO
- Legal status: Association
- Headquarters: ul. Zielna 39
- Location: Warsaw, Poland
- Coordinates: 52.236111°N 21.006389°E
- Region served: Worldwide
- President: Janusz Komorowski
- Website: armiakrajowa.org.pl

The World Association of Home Army Soldiers (Polish: Światowy Związek Żołnierzy Armii Krajowej; abbreviated ŚZŻAK) is an international non-governmental organization gathering former soldiers of the Home Army. ŚZŻAK brings together members of the Army and other armed organizations subordinate in time of World War II to the Polish government-in-exile who fought for Polish independence. Those who continued the fight for independence after the dissolution of the Home Army and persons who adhere to the ideals of the Home Army and act to stabilize them in Polish society are also considered for membership. In the early 1990s the organization had over 80,000 members, in the year 2008 about 35,000 members, and in 2010 about 12,000 members.

The highest authority of the World Association of Home Army Soldiers is the Congress of Delegates, and in the periods between meetings the ŚZŻAK is managed by the Governing Council, the executive board, Chief Audit Commission, and General Court of Arbitration. Members of these bodies are elected by the Assembly of Delegates for three-year terms.

On 10 April 2010, the Polish Air Force Tu-154 crash in Smolensk killed Czeslaw Cywinski, President of the ŚZŻAK. On 15 May 2010, by the decision of the IX Congress of Delegates, Stanislaus Oleksiak was elected president.

== Office holders ==
=== Presidents ===
- Stanislaw Wojciech Borzobohaty – in 1989–1991
- Alexander Tyszkiewicz – in 1991–1995
- Stanislaw Karolkiewicz – in 1995–2005
- Czesław Cywiński – in 2005–2010
- Stanislaw Oleksiak – in 2010–2013
- Leszek Zukowski – in 2013–2020
- Hanna Stadnik – in 2020–2020
- Jerzy Żelaśkiewicz – in 2021–2021
- Teresa Stanek – in 2021–2023
- Janusz Komorowski – in 2023–present
