= Bureau of Information and Propaganda =

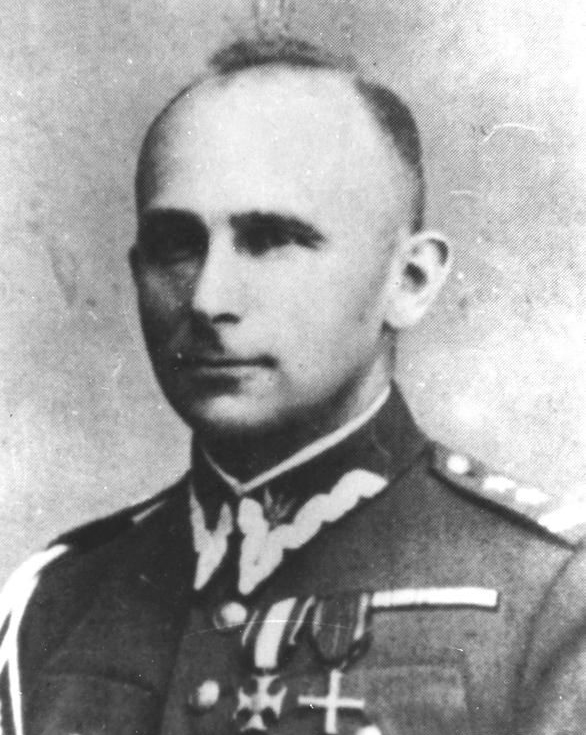
Colonel Jan Rzepecki

The Bureau of Information and Propaganda of the Headquarters of Związek Walki Zbrojnej, later of Armia Krajowa (Polish: Biuro Informacji i Propagandy (Komendy Głównej Związku Walki Zbrojnej - Armii Krajowej) - in short: BIP), a conspiracy department created in spring 1940 during the German occupation of Poland, inside the Związek Walki Zbrojnej, then of the Supreme Command of Armia Krajowa (as 6th Department).

Initially, its commander was Major Tadeusz Kruk-Strzelecki, then Colonel Jan Rzepecki pseudonym "Wolski" or "Prezes". Until the end of 1940, his deputy was Hipolit Niepokólczycki, while since 1944 until January 1945, Captain Kazimierz Moczarski.

Tasks of BIP included informing of Polish community activities by the Polish Government in London, documenting activities of the German occupiers, psychological warfare against Nazi propaganda, consolidation of solidarity in the fight for independence of the Polish nation, collecting of information, reports and orders. BIP published underground newspapers, such as: Biuletyn Informacyjny (Information Bulletin), Wiadomości Polskie (Polish News) and Insurekcja (Insurrection); some of its departments carried secret trainings: Department A (film) in photoreport, direction, operation of megaphones.

Among others, cameramen and cutters Antoni Bohdziewicz, Wacław Kaźmierczak, Leonard Zawisławski, Seweryn Kruszyński, film/stage directors Jerzy Gabryelski, Jerzy Zarzycki pseudonym "Pik", Andrzej Ancuta, photographers Sylwester Braun and Joachim Joachimczyk, historian Aleksander Gieysztor, philologist professor Kazimierz Feliks Kumaniecki worked for BIP. Among others, Krystyna Wyczańska and Hanna Bińkowska were its liaisons officers.

== Organisation of BIP ==
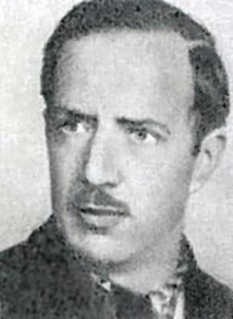
Tadeusz Żenczykowski

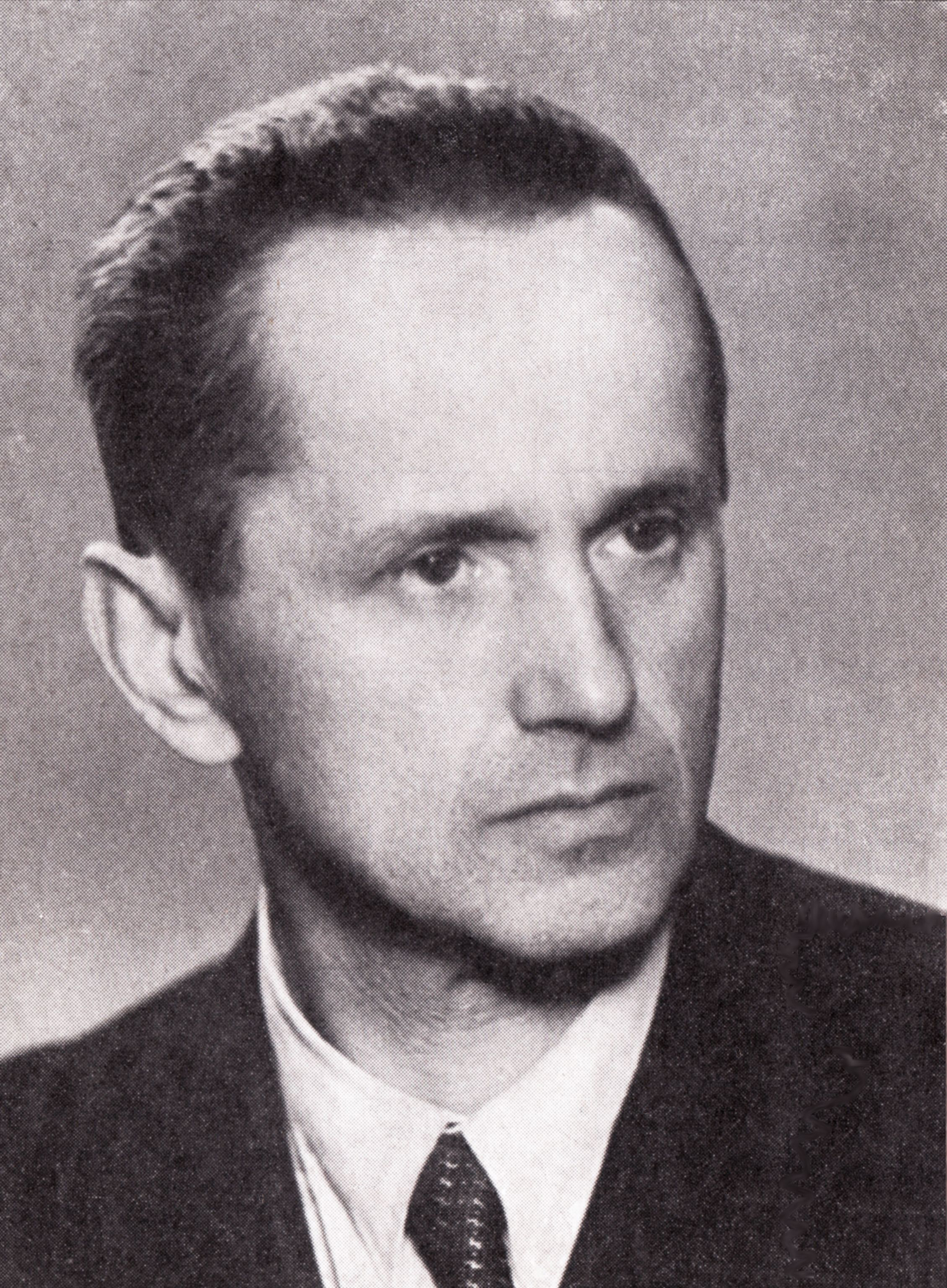
Kazimierz Moczarski

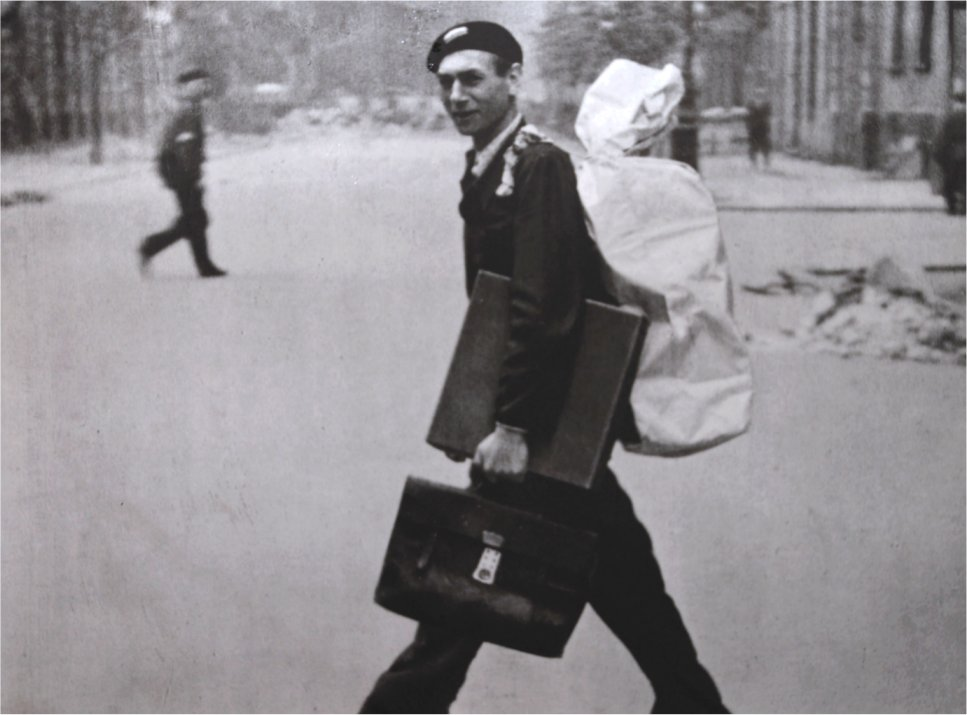
Wacław Kaźmierczak in Warsaw Uprising

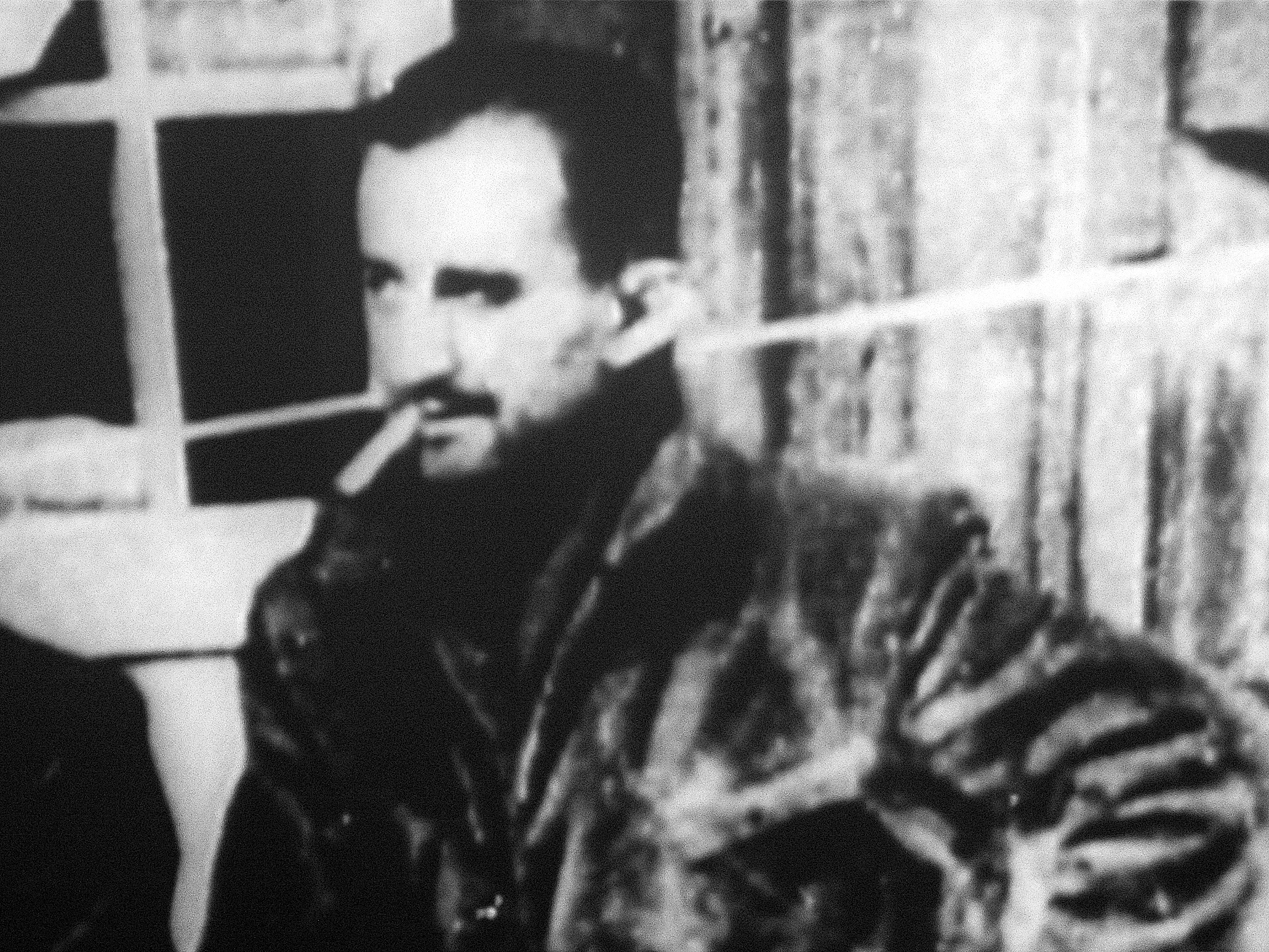
Antoni Bohdziewicz - chief of Office of Film

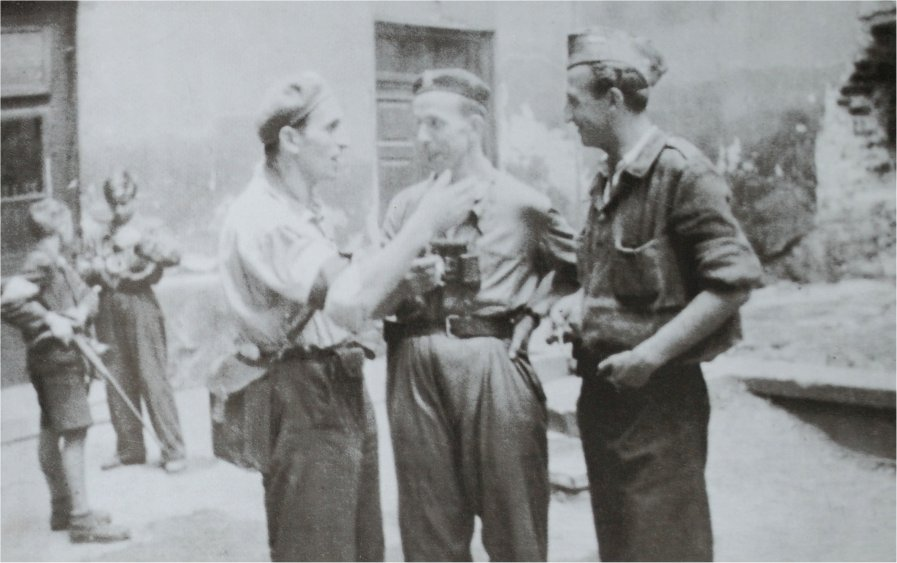
Joachim Joachimczyk, photoreporter of Office of Photography (first left)

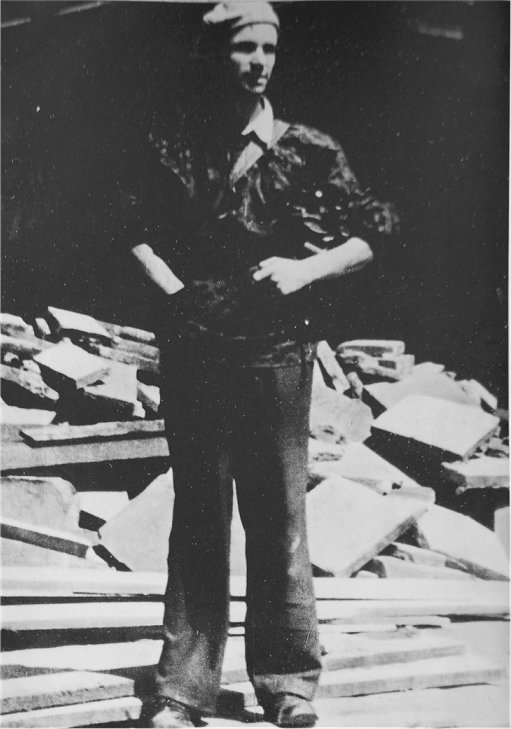
Andrzej Ancuta - cameraman of Office of Film

One of satirical posters created by employees of the Sub-department of "N" Propaganda

"Germany is kaput" (German: Deutschland kaput): defeatist poster disseminated in the General Government by Operation N after the battle of Stalingrad, 1943.

Polish resistance satirical poster - "New European Order" (German: Die Neuordnung Europas) - Polish reaction on Hitler's plans to establish a "new order" in Europe, under domination of Nazi Germany. In the middle: Adolf Hitler, background: imprisoned European nations (France, Bulgaria, Holland [sic], Yugoslavia, Belgium, Greece, Poland, Hungary etc.)

As of July 1944, the Bureau of Information and Propaganda ZWZ–AK included:

- Secretary – Irena Piasecka pseudonym "Elżbieta", "Kreska"
- Department of Finance – Maria Wielhorska-Szpręglewska pseudonym "Maska"
- Department of Post – name unknown pseudonym "Anna"
- Department of Emergency Liaison – Irena Markiewicz pseudonym "Jaga"
- Department of Microphotography – Andrzej Pronaszko pseudonym "Majster"
- Department of Current Propaganda – Major Tadeusz Wardejn-Zagórski pseudonym "Gozdawa"
  - Sekretary office – Hanna Hryniewiecka pseudonym "Maryna"
  - Branch bulletins (editorial teams of Biuletyn Informacyjny (Information Bulletin), "Wiadomości Polskie" (Polish News) and Głos Ojczyzny (Voice of the Homeland))
  - Bureau of Military History – doctor Stanisław Płoski pseudonym "Sławski"
- Department of Information – Major Jerzy Makowiecki pseudonym "Tomasz", Lieutenant Aleksander Gieysztor (pseudonym "Lissowski" or "Borodzicz")
  - Sekretary office – Zofia Straszewska pseudonym "Magdalena"
  - Bureau of the Department of Information
  - Sub-department W – internal situation of occupied Poland – Antoni Szymanowski pseudonym "Brun"
    - Office W 1 – occupant's policy, germanisation, German propaganda, recording of acts of terror
    - Office W 2 – administration, occupant's legislation, self-government institutions
    - Office W 3 – economic matters
    - Office W 4 – social matters
    - Office W 5 – cultural matters
  - Sub-department P – Kazimierz Ostrowski pseudonym "Łaski"
    - Office P 1 – organised political life in the underground
    - Office P 2 – communist and communist-like organisations
    - Office P 3 – attitude of Polish community
    - Office P 4 – problems of social resistance
    - Office P 5 – press and program publications of political organisations
    - Jewish Department – Henryk Woliński pseudonym "Wacław"
  - Sub-department R of Radio Information – Jerzy Olivier-Merson pseudonym "Wiktor"
    - Office R 1 – editorial team of Dziennik Radiowy (Radio Daily)
    - Office R 2 – editorial team of Służba Reutera (Reuter News)
    - Office R 3 – editorial team of Biuletyn Sztabowy (Staff Bulletin)
    - Office R 4 – editorial team of Serwis Kościuszki (Kościuszko News) and "Świt" (The Dawn)
    - Local Inspection
- Department of Mobilisation Propaganda – captain Tadeusz Żenczykowski pseudonym "Kania", "Kowalik"
  - Sub-department of "N" Propaganda (psychological subversion against German community) – captain Tadeusz Żenczykowski
    - Section I of Organisation – Antoni Szadkowski pseudonym "Leszek"
      - Courier team
      - Team of "Service"
      - Unit of Legalisation
    - Section II of Studies – Michał Mendys pseudonym "Baca"
      - Unit of Economy
      - Unit of History
      - Unit of Domestic Policy
      - Unit of Propaganda
      - Unit of Press
      - Unit of Foreign Affairs
    - Section III of Editorial Service – headed by Professor Kazimierz Feliks Kumaniecki pseudonym "Kozakiewicz"
      - Editorial Teams of German-language clandestine papers "Der Klabautermann", "Die Ostwache"
    - Section IV of Special Actions – Kazimierz Gorzkowski pseudonym "Godziemba" or "Wolf"
    - Section V of Publication Distribution – Jerzy Rolicki pseudonym "Jacek"
  - Sub-department of Mobilisation Propaganda "Rój" – Zygmunt Ziółek pseudonym "Sawa"
    - Section A of Information and Film – headed by Stanisław Olkusznik pseudonym "Śmiałowski"
      - Office of Press – Sławomir Dunin-Borkowski pseudonym "Jaskólski"
      - Office of Radio – Stanisław Zadrożny pseudonym "Pawlicz"
      - Office of Megaphones – Czesław Kotlarczyk pseudonym "Czema"
      - Office of Photography – Wacław Żdżarski pseudonym "Kozłowski"
      - Office of Film – Antoni Bohdziewicz pseudonym "Wiktor"
    - Section B of Culture Propaganda – Bronisław Rutkowski pseudonym "Korycki"
      - Office of Photography – Stanisław Ryszard Dobrowolski pseudonym "Goliard"
      - Office of Music – Bronisław Rutkowski pseudonym "Korycki"
      - Office of Theatre – Józef Wyszomirski pseudonym "Albin"
      - Office of Publication – Józef Sosnowski pseudonym "Brzeziński"
      - Office of Bookstores and Libraries – Tadeusz Suchocki pseudonym "Radwan"
      - Office of Planning – Mieczysław Jurgielewicz pseudonym "Narbutt"
    - Section C of Technical Matters – Kazimierz Dobrowolski pseudonym "Szymczak")
    - Section D of Field Propaganda – Stanisław Ostrowski pseudonym "Bogdan"
      - Office of Patrols
      - Office of Field BIPs
      - Office of Equipment
  - Editorial Team of Gawędy Żołnierskie (Soldier's Talks) – Zygmunt Ziółek pseudonym "Sawa"
  - Sub-department of Aid for Soldiers – headed by Major Hanna Łukaszewicz pseudonym "Ludwika"
    - Section of Organisation
    - Section of Propaganda and Training
    - Section of Economy
    - Section of Social Care
  - Sub-department "Antyk" – captain Tadeusz Żenczykowski pseudonym "Krawczyk"
    - Office of Editorial Service – captain Tadeusz Żenczykowski
    - Office of Organisation – name unknown
    - Office of Publication Distribution – Bolesław Trenda
- Wydział Kolportażu BIP KG AK – kierownictwo: Wanda Kraszewska-Ancerewicz pseudonym "Lena"
- Secret Military Publishing House – headed by Jerzy Rutkowski pseudonym "Michał Kmita"
  - Secretary – Maria Rutkowska-Mierzejewska pseudonym "Janka"
  - Section of Administration – Igor Telechun pseudonym "Łukasz"
  - Section of Supplies – Aleksander Wąsowski pseudonym "Józef"
  - Section of Technical Matters – Stefan Berent pseudonym "Steb"
  - Cell of Drawings – Stanisław Kunstetter pseudonym "Krzysztof"
  - Printing house W 2 – Jerzy Paszyc pseudonym "Stefan"
  - Printing house W 3 – Władysław Pomorski pseudonym "Jerzy"
  - Printing house W 4 – Michał Wojewódzki pseudonym"Andrzej"
  - Printing house W 5 – Czesław Mierzejewski pseudonym"Marek"
  - Printing house W 6 – Jerzy Mierzejewski pseudonym "Jacek"
  - Printing house W 7 – Michał Wojewódzki pseudonym "Andrzej"
  - Printing house W 8 – Jerzy Paszyc pseudonym "Stefan"
  - Printing house W 9 – Marian Jędrzejczyk pseudonym"Kazimierz"
  - Printing house W 10 – Stanisław Stopczyk pseudonym "Antoni"
- Editorial Team of Professional Military Press – Lieutenant-Colonel Mieczysław Biernacki pseudonym "Mieczysław"
  - Insurekcja (Insurrection) – Mieczysław Biernacki
  - Żołnierz Polski (Polish Soldier) – Mieczysław Biernacki
