= Andrzej Ancuta =

Polish cinematographer

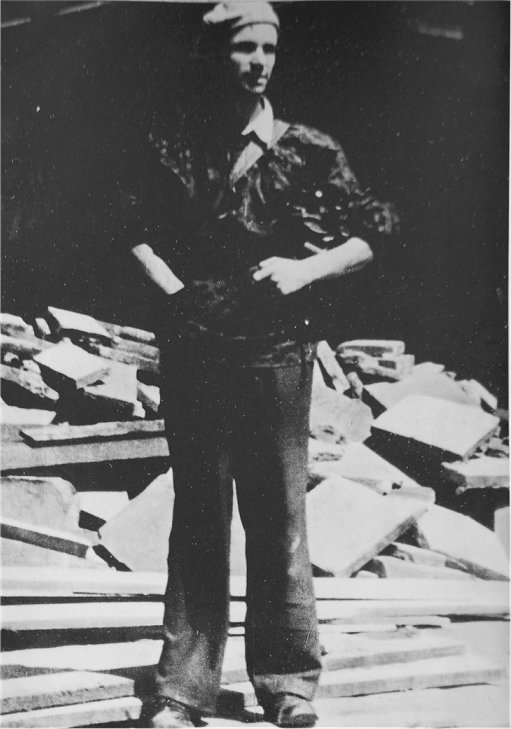
- Ancuta during the Warsaw Uprising (1944)
- Born: 10 February 1919; Minsk, Poland
- Died: February 14, 2009 (aged 90); Warsaw, Poland
- Occupation: Cinematographer

Andrzej Ancuta (Belarusian: Андрэй Анцута; 1919–2009) was a Polish cinematographer. Ancuta participated in the Warsaw Uprising against the German occupation during the Second World War. He worked on several post-war films such as Three Women (1957). He later taught cinematography at the National Film School in Łódź.

== Selected filmography ==
- Warsaw Premiere (1951)

== Bibliography ==
- Haltof, Marek. Polish Film and the Holocaust: Politics and Memory. Berghahn Books, 2012.
