= Jan Rzepecki =

Polish military person

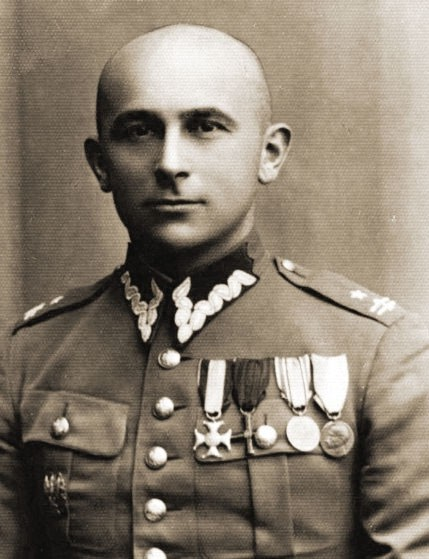
Jan Rzepecki

Jan Rzepecki alias „Prezes” (29 September 1899 in Warsaw – 28 April 1983 in Warsaw) was a Polish soldier and military historian, colonel of the Polish Army. Commander of the Bureau of Information and Propaganda of Home Army from 1940 to 1945. After World War II commander of the Armed Forces Delegation for Poland and the first president of the anti-communist organization Freedom and Independence.

He was arrested by the communist government shortly afterward and decided to cooperate with the state authorities, for which his sentence was pardoned.

He was the uncle of Ewa Pohoska.
