= Biuletyn Informacyjny =

Polish magazine during WWII

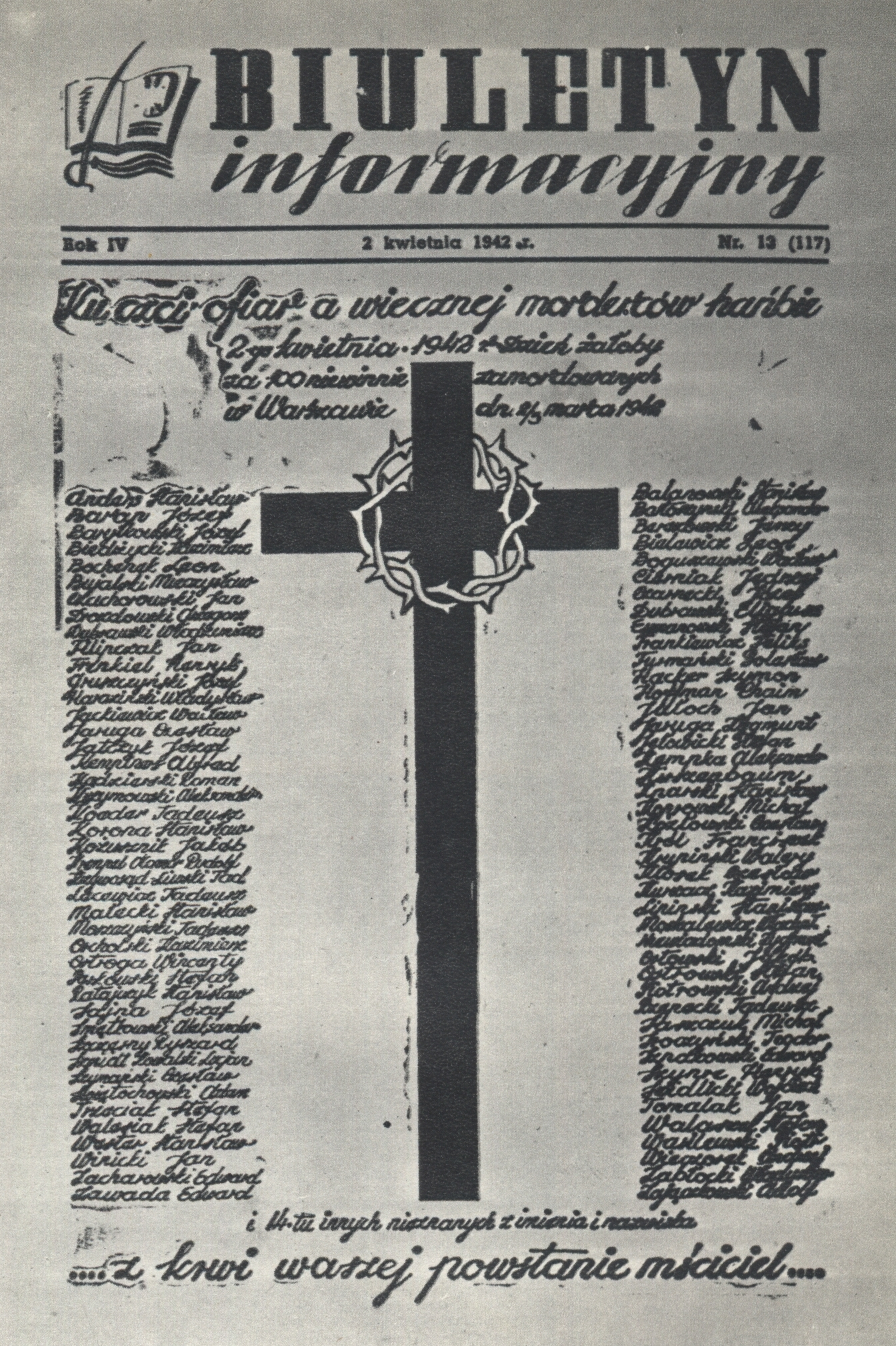
- 1942 cover of the Biuletyn Informacyjny reporting on the massacre of 100 prisoners from Pawiak
- Type: Weekly newspaper
- Format: Bulletin
- Owners: SZP; AK; Bureau of Information and Propaganda
- Editor-in-chief: Aleksander Kamiński (1939-1944); Kazimierz Feliks Kumaniecki (1944-1945)
- Editor: Zofia Kossak-Szczucka
- General manager: Major Tadeusz Wardejn-Zagórski
- Founded: November 5, 1939; 86 years ago
- Ceased publication: January 19, 1945
- Language: Polish
- Headquarters: Warsaw
- City: Warsaw (1939-1944); Kraków (1944-1945)
- Country: General Government
- Circulation: 42,000-43,000 (as of 1944)

Biuletyn Informacyjny ("Information Bulletin") was a Polish underground weekly published covertly in General Government territory of occupied Poland during World War II. The magazine was edited by Aleksander Kamiński and distributed as the main organ of ZWZ-AK headquarters in Warsaw, initially in order to inform the AK soldier about ongoing resistance activities. By 1944 Biuletyn Informacyjny had a circulation of 42,000-43,000 copies. The publishers recommended readers to have the articles reprinted in provincial underground publications throughout Poland.

== History ==
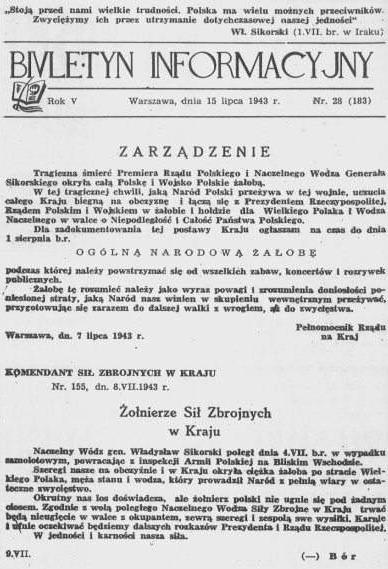
Biuletyn Informacyjny from 15 July 1943 informing about the death of general Władysław Sikorski and ordering a national day of mourning

The Bulletin was started in November 1939 in Warsaw as the main press release of the SZP, the first underground resistance organisation in Poland. Soon it was taken over by the Armia Krajowa and the Bureau of Information and Propaganda of the Polish government-in-exile. Since 1941 it had also several regional versions in all major cities of Poland, both under German and Soviet occupation. During the Warsaw Uprising it was published openly as a daily, the main press release of the Polish forces. After the capitulation of Warsaw it was published in Kraków until the dissolution of AK in January 1945.

On October 3, 1944, the Biuletyn Informacyjny published the following communiqué signed by Lieutenant-General Tadeusz Bór-Komorowski, Commander-in-Chief of the Home Army, after signing the act of surrender:

Soldiers of Fighting Warsaw! The heroic deeds of Polish soldiers which constitute two months of fighting in Warsaw are proofs, however full of horror, of our desire for freedom – our strongest desire. Our battle in the capital, in the face of death and destruction, stands in the forefront of famous deeds of Polish soldiers during this war. They will be a lasting memorial to our spirit and love of freedom. Although we were not able to gain a military victory over our enemy (since the general situation in our country was not favourable to our endeavour), those two months of fighting for every foot of Warsaw's streets and walls have fulfilled a political and ideological goal. Our struggle will influence the fate of our nation, since it is a contribution without equal in its heroism and sacrifice to the defence of our independence. — Bór (excerpt, pictured)

== See also ==
- Nowy Kurier Warszawski
