= Jerzy Rutkowski =

Polish political activist and resistance soldier

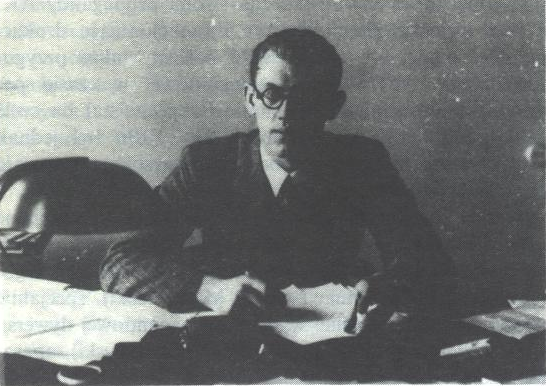
Jerzy Rutkowski

Jerzy Rutkowski (23 April 1914 – 18 December 1989) was a Polish political activist and resistance soldier.

Rutkowski was born in Kiev on 23 April 1914.

In 1937, Rutkowski was the leader of the Polish Youth Union. There was an attempt to assassinate him on 16 November 1937 when he was shot at three times, with one bullet hitting his hat.

During World War II, he joined Polish resistance (Armia Krajowa) and was the head of the underground press operation, the Tajne Wojskowe Zakłady Wydawnicze, throughout its operations, from 1940 to 1945.

Rutkowski died in Warsaw on 18 December 1989. His son Michal Rutkowski is the Director for Human Development in the South Asia division of the World Bank.
