= Operation N =

1941–1944 Polish sabotage, subversion, and propaganda campaign against Nazi Germany

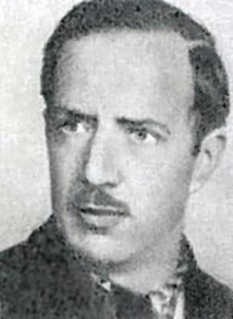
Tadeusz Żenczykowski, codename "Kania", chief of Operation N

Operation N (Polish: Akcja N, where "N" stands for the Polish word "Niemcy," "Germany") was a complex of sabotage, subversion and black-propaganda activities carried out by the Polish resistance against Nazi German occupation forces during World War II, from April 1941 to April 1944. These activities were organized by Office N, which in October 1941 was transformed into an Autonomous Sub-Department N of the Bureau of Information and Propaganda of the Armed Resistance, later of the Home Army. It was headed by Tadeusz Żenczykowski (codename Kania).

Operation N constituted part of a psychological-warfare campaign against the German occupation. It produced German-language newspapers and leaflets, ostensibly distributed by German anti-Nazi groups.

== Structure ==
"Germany is kaput" (German: "Deutschland kaput"): defeatist poster disseminated in the General Government by Operation N after the 1943 Battle of Stalingrad

Autonomous Sub-Department N comprised five sections:

- organization,
- studies,
- subversive actions,
- editing,
- distribution of publications.

Work was carried on with extraordinary precision. The studies section collected special information about the history and geography of Germany, especially about the German language, its dialects, jargons used by various milieus and professional circles, terms used in state administration, about politics, the economy, and opinions current in the army, among the civilian population, etc.

On that basis, thousands of leaflets, pamphlets and periodicals of various political persuasions were produced, from communist to monarchist, as well as satirical and religious periodicals.

In order to act efficiently, there were necessary appropriate local agencies, a set of secret printing houses, printing machines, documentation, files. About 700-950 persons participated in the Action N (editors, translators, printers, couriers and distributors), including boy scouts of Szare Szeregi. About 20,000-30,000 copies of various publications were distributed per month (newspapers, periodicals, leaflets, etc.). In total, during 1942–1944 over 1 million copies of various publications and propaganda materials.

== Aims ==
Polish Resistance satirical poster, "New European Order" (German: "Die Neuordnung Europas"): Polish reaction to Hitler's plan to establish a "New Order" in Europe, under Nazi German domination. Center: Hitler. Background: imprisoned European nations (France, Bulgaria, Holland, Yugoslavia, Belgium, Greece, Poland, Hungary, etc.).

That action was aimed at confusion, moral pressure and undermining the morale of Germans. Because of that, there were edited and distributed various publications, addressed for civilian citizens of Third Reich, for German soldiers, for Volksdeutsche, officers of occupational administration. Among periodicals, the following titles were published regularly:

- Der Soldat (Engl.: Soldier), published by turns with a monthly Der Frontkämpfer (Engl.. The Front Combatant) - both the periodicals suggested the existence of a wide anti-Nazi opposition inside the German army; an alleged conspiracy organisation was to include circles of the body of generals and higher officers of the army.
- Der Hammer (Engl.: Hammer), and Der Durchbruch (Engl.The Breakthrough) - monthlies addressed for Germans of social-democratic and left-wing views.
- Der Klabautermann (Engl.: ship ghost, affecting seamen with misfortune) - a satirical periodical.
- Die Ostwache (Engl.: Guard in the East) - addressed for German occupational administration in the East.
- Die Zukunft (Engl.: The Future) - a periodical for Polish Volksdeutsche, under a bilingual title.
- Kennst Du die Wahrheit? (Engl.: Do You Know the Truth?) - a periodical addressed for Germans from the prewar area of the Third Reich and also for the Volksdeutsche in occupied Poland.

Apart from that, two counterfeit issues of the Polish-language so-called reptile press the Goniec Krakowski daily (English: Kraków Courier) were published, and on 21 March 1943, 10,000 copies of a counterfeit issue of a similar daily Nowy Kurier Warszawski (English: New Warsaw Courier) were published. Additionally, defeatist pamphlets and leaflets were published. Their alleged authorship was to indicate some German anti-Nazi conspiracy organisations; they were to affirm the certainty of the close downfall of the Third Reich. All texts were elaborated by Polish translators in correct German language, with consideration of German regional dialects. Because of that, long after the war the actions were attributed to Germans.

== Activities ==
Der Klabautermann (an Operation N magazine), 3 January 1943 issue, satirizing Third Reich Nazi terror and genocide. At right, emerging from the III ("Three", of "Third Reich"): Hitler and Himmler.

Emphasis was placed on simulation of activities of non-existing German resistance groups and on impersonation of existing groups. For this purpose, a separate analytical cell was created in the Bureau of Information and Propaganda (Section II of Studies of the Sub-department of "N" Propaganda). Headed by Michał Mendys, it carried studies upon Nazism; its social and political context, structural changes, personal staff, and current directions of activities. Studies were carried out on the ways the Nazi party communicated with the community, its party jargon, and its language notions. Studies were carried out on the prewar history, foundations, and political programs of German opposition organisations, and on conflicts and groups in Wehrmacht. Based on the results of this analysis, twenty fictitious German organisations were created, including:

- Heimatsbund "Freiheit und Frieden" (Engl.: Homeland Association "Freedom and Friendship") - an underground civil organisation, with alleged seats in Munich and Berlin, appealing to the German civil population to stop their excessive work and sacrifices for Germany's military industry.
- Süddeutscher Freiheitsbund (Engl.: Freedom Association of Southern Germans) - an organisation allegedly active in Munchen and Wien. It called for new elections to the Reichstag, free of electoral falsifications, and called for the politics of NSDAP to be condemned by the whole nation.
- Der Verband Deutscher Frontsoldaten (Engl.: Association of German Soldiers of the Front Line) - an anti-Nazi organisation favoring a speedy armistice with the Allies, and criticising the politics of NSDAP.
- Soldatenbund "Hindenburg" (Engl.: Soldiers' Association "Hindenburg") - an alleged military organisation attempting to persuade German soldiers of the impossibility of winning the war with the USSR, constantly stressing the high losses of Wehrmacht in the Eastern front, and calling for the overthrow of Adolf Hitler.
- Verband der freien Deutschen Nordamerikas (Engl.: Association of Free Germans of North America in New York) - an organisation allegedly representing Germans living in the United States of America, denouncing the enormity of German crimes, opting against nazification of Europe, and calling on fellow citizens to fight against Adolf Hitler and NSDAP.
- Der Deutsche Demokratenbund (Engl.: German Democratic Association) - an organisation that criticised the allies of the Third Reich i.e. Axis powers, in order to arise distrust of the allies and to weaken mutual relations. It attempted to persuade Germans that the alliance with Italy would result in a catastrophe for Germany. It also warned against the increase of the strength of Japan, and claimed that this was an outcome of the irresponsible politics of Adolf Hitler, who had promised Japan influence in Asia and Polynesia without any guarantee that it would declare war on the USSR.
- Der Soldatenrat einer Infanteriedivision im Osten (Engl.: Soldiers' Council of an Infantry Division in the East) - an organisation objecting against high losses in people and equipment in the eastern front. It addressed leaflets and open letters to German soldiers fighting in the eastern front, in which it protested against the mendacity of German propaganda and the absence of the freedom of speech, demanded a disclosure of the actual state of German losses, called for the replacement of the supreme commander of German army, and warned of the looming military defeat.
- Österreichische Freiheitsfront (Engl.: Austrian Front of Liberty) - allegedly created in Wien in 1943; it addressed leaflets to Austrians, in which it stressed that in the five years since the Anschluss Austria had been placed under the yoke of the Nazi authority and was suffering the burdens of war imposed by German fascists. In leaflets and proclamations, it stressed that Austrians were suffering hunger, persecution, and death not for their own cause, but in the interest of Germany. The organisation called for a fight against Nazis Third Reich and for the institution of local organisations under the banner "Austria for Austrians" (Germ. "Österreich den Österreichern").

== Other activities ==
Operation N poster satirizing the German motto, "Gott mit uns" ("God is with us"). Left: Hitler. Right: Himmler. Center: Christ.

Apart from the publication of periodicals and leaflets, Operation N also assumed other forms, including targeting specific, identified Germans by sending them leaflets, false orders or forged official notices. For instance, in February 1943, a fake order was sent to Germans living in Warsaw stating that a curfew was being instituted for them, with a warning that breaking it could result in injury or death. Later that year a notice informed Germans that gas-masks would be distributed on some days of the week only because of an insufficient supply of masks. It caused chaos and panic among the addressees of the message.

On 30 April 1942 a false order was sent out to 209 factories under German administration, ordering that all workers be granted a fully paid day off work, due to the celebration of the day the NSDAP came to power.

In February 1944 a false order was issued specifying the sequence of evacuation of all Germans residing within the area of the General Government, which was that the Gestapo was to be evacuated first, then the SS, then the SA, then officials of the German administration, followed by the Reichdeutsche (i.e. Germans coming from the prewar territory of the Reich - Germany) and finally the Volksdeutsche. It contained the forged signature of SS Commander and Police general Wilhelm Koppe.

Similar actions of disinformation and other forms of propaganda were periodically carried out. After September 1943 the word "October" was written on walls, to evoke fears of the coming month of October.

Under a separate Action "tse-tse" Germans were annoyed by phone calls with threats, by letters, false notices or by sealing up the keyholes of their flats with gypsum. The "tse-tse" actions were carried by scouts of Szare Szeregi (ca 19 units) and every German was to receive two "stings" chosen from the various anti-German actions available. This was augmented by other forms of Small sabotage such as the painting of "Kotwica", the "Sign of Fighting Poland", and was also carried out by Szare Szeregi.

== Epilogue ==
Operation N peaked in 1943, when the network covered most of Poland, including Szczecin, Wrocław and towns of eastern Poland. In the spring of 1944 the operation was suspended. Several factors contributed to this:

- the uncovering, by the Gestapo, of Operation N's main Warsaw printing-house and of the whole operation in the period, December 1943 – March 1944 (though no order was issued for the operation's winding-down, and the network remained in readiness);
- a substantial shift in the attitude of German community towards the policy of the Third Reich due to constant military discomfitures in the front and systematic bombardments by the Allies;
- a change in political situation inside Poland: the German propaganda dropped down, while that of Polish communists of the Polish Workers' Party and that of the USSR intensified, which resulted in the institution in November 1943 by the Bureau of Information and Propaganda of Armia Krajowa of "Operation Antyk" to conduct anti-communist and anti-soviet propaganda.

== See also ==
- Minor sabotage
- Operation Antyk
