= 1943 Pinsk Prison raid =

Date	18 January 1943
Location	Pinsk, Poland
Result	Successful raid: 43 prisoners were released

Belligerents
Armia Krajowa	Germany

Commanders and leaders
Jan Piwnik	Ludwig Hellinger

Strength
40 soldiers	3.000 soldiers: 100 Feldgendarmerie; 300 Ukrainian Auxiliary Police; 1.000 Don Cossacks; A Wehrmacht battalion

Casualties and losses
1 wounded	3 killed
- 30 Polish and Belarusian civilians executed in reprisal

The 1943 Pinsk Prison raid was one of the most spectacular raids in the history of the Home Army and the Polish Underground State. It took place on 18 January 1943 in Pinsk, the town in Eastern Poland (now in Belarus), which at that time was under German occupation as part of Reichskommissariat Ukraine. The purpose of the raid was to release a Cichociemni agent and his comrades, who had been captured by the Germans while trying to blow up the Horyn river bridge.

The raid was a success, as 40 Polish soldiers, divided into six groups and commanded by Jan Piwnik, managed to enter the heavily guarded prison, and release Alfred Paczkowski (Wania), Marian Czarnecki (Rys), and Piotr Downar (Azorek). A fourth prisoner, Mieczysław Eckardt (Bocian) had been killed by the SS during the interrogation. The raid lasted only 15 minutes. Several of the participants later received military awards for their actions.

== Events ==
Captain Alfred Paczkowski (nom de guerre Wania) was trained in Great Britain and as a member of the elite Cichociemni, was parachuted over Poland in 1942. Named one of commandants of the Wachlarz sabotage organization, he was engaged in diversionary activities in the rear of German forces, operating on Eastern Front. Sent to Belarus, he liquidated Gestapo agents and blew up German transports between Brześć nad Bugiem and Minsk. Captured by the enemy, together with three other agents, Czarnecki, Downar and Eckardt, he was taken to the Pinsk prison.

Colonel Adam Remigiusz Grocholski, who was Commander in Chief of Wachlarz, came to the conclusion that all four agents were lost. General Stefan Rowecki, however, decided to try to rescue them, after consulting the matter with Generals Tadeusz Pełczyński and Tadeusz Bór-Komorowski. Furthermore, Marian Przysiecki, a resident of Pinsk and former chief of local Wachlarz, who had managed to escape from the prison, pledged his support. His assistance was crucial, as he knew the prison well.

The Germans were aware of the fact that Paczkowski had been sent from England, and tortured him, hoping to get some information. Paczkowski tried to tell his oppressors made-up names and stories.

General Rowecki ordered another Cichociemni agent, Jan Piwnik (Ponury) to execute the raid. The purpose was simple, to free the captured soldiers, in any way possible. Piwnik's chances were slim, as the prison was heavily guarded both by the Wehrmacht and Ukrainian auxiliary forces. The Polish agents had little time and did not familiarise themselves much with the town.

At first, Piwnik tried to bribe the prison guards with 40,000 Reichsmarks, but he was unable to reach their overseer. The only solution was to carry out a raid. Its success was based on precision and surprise. The plan was prepared in an apartment used for meetings in Brześć, by four Cichociemni agents: Piwnik himself, Jan Rogowski (Czarek), Wacław Kopisto (Kry) and Michał Fijalek (Kawy). Altogether, they decided that 16 people were needed for the raid. They were opposed by 100 German military police, 300 Ukrainian auxiliaries, 1,000 Don Cossacks, and a Wehrmacht battalion: altogether, some 3,000 men were stationed in Pinsk in January 1943. Furthermore, the prison was located in a building with very thick walls, and in case of success, all released prisoners were to be transported to Warsaw, some 400 kilometres (250 mi) away, across occupied territory.

The raid began in the morning of 17 January, when fourteen men gathered in the apartment in Brześć. They all headed towards Pinsk in two vehicles: a Ford truck and Opel Kadett. At the same time, a Chevrolet truck left Janow Poleski, also heading for Pinsk. In the evening all conspirators reached their destination, and Piwnik presented to them the plan of the raid. Four groups (twelve men, including Piwnik), with one soldier dressed in an SS officer uniform, were to enter the complex, and complete their mission in less than 30 minutes. Four members of the two extra groups were to wait in the vehicles. All decided to use Russian language during the raid, to make the Germans believe that Soviet partisans were responsible. Also, they wanted to prevent possible German reprisals against ethnic Polish civilians.

At three minutes to five p.m., the Opel Kadett with Polish conspirators appeared by the prison complex. An SS officer emerged from the vehicle, ordering the guards to open the gate. The vehicle entered the courtyard, and the guard who locked the gate was shot by the Pole who was wearing the SS uniform. Soon afterwards, the second group entered the office of the prison, destroying telephone wires. Two additional German guards, Hellinger and Zollner, were shot by the Poles, who after finding the keys, began opening the cells, shouting in Russian: "In the name of Stalin, you are free, get out!" Among those released was Paczkowski, who was very weak, but still alive.

All conspirators, together with the freed men, jumped into their vehicles, heading back towards Brześć and Drohiczyn. Meanwhile, the Germans, due to destroyed telephone wires, found out about the raid only after several hours. Finally, on 20 January 1943, Paczkowski reached his Warsaw apartment, where his wife Alicja awaited.

On 13 February 1943, in recognition for the exemplary raid, Jan Piwnik and Jan Rogowski (Czarka) were awarded Silver Crosses of the Virtuti Militari, by General Grot Rowecki. Other participants in the raid were awarded the Cross of Valour.

The Germans quickly found out that it was the Home Army, not the Soviets, who carried out the raid. In return, they shot 30 captives, ethnic Poles, arrested in Pinsk.

This is the list of the soldiers, who took part in the Pinsk Raid:

Group I: Jan Piwnik "Ponury", Władysław Hackiewicz, "MSZ", "Zaleski", Zbigniew Wojnowski, "Motor, Zbigniew Sulima (dressed as SS officer)

Group II: Jan Rogowski, "Czarka", Waclaw Kopisto, "Kra", Zbigniew Słonczyński, "Jastrzebiec", "Jastrząb", Turon, "Dzik".

Group III: Michał Fijalka, "Kawa", Wiktor Holub, "Kmicic", Czesław Holub, "Ryks", Skwierczyński, "Dym".

Group IV: "Wrona" – "Kruk", Władysław Westwalewicz, "Plomien".

Group V: Edward Pobudkiewicz, "Monster", Henryk Fedorowicz, "Pakunek".

Group VI: Bronisław Posluszny, "Drucik", other names are unknown.

== See also ==
- Wachlarz
- Kedyw

== Sources ==
- The description of the raid on the Cichociemni webpage
- AKCJA PIŃSKA: ZDOBYĆ WIĘZIENIE!
