= Rogowski =

Rogowski (feminine: Rogowska; plural: Rogowscy) is a Polish surname. It is related to a number of surnames in other languages. Belarusian and Ukrainian forms are generally transliterated from Cyrillic with an "h" but sometimes appear with a 'g' instead.

== Related surnames ==
Language	Masculine	Feminine
Polish	Rogowski	Rogowska
Belarusian (Romanization)	Рагоўскі (Rahoŭski, Ragouski)	Рагоўская (Rahouskaya, Rahoŭskaja)
Czech/Slovak	Rohovský; Rogovský	Rohovská; Rogovská
Hungarian	Rogovszky; Rohovszky	
Latvian	Rogovskis	Rogovska
Lithuanian	Ragauskas	Ragauskienė (married); Ragauskaitė (unmarried)
Romanian/Moldovan	Rogovschi, Rogovschii	
Russian (Romanization)	Роговский (Rogovskiy, Rogovskii, Rogovskij, Rogovsky, Rogovski)	Роговская (Rogovskaya, Rogovskaia, Rogovskaja)
Ukrainian (Romanization)	Роговський (Rohovskyi, Rohovskyy, Rohovskyj, Rohovsky, Rogovskyi, Rogovskyy, Rogovskyj, Rogovsky)	Роговська (Rohovska, Rogovska)
Other	Rogowsky, Rogofsky, Rogofski, Rogauskas; Rohowsky	

== People ==
- Alan Rogowski (born 1942), American wrestler
- Anna Rogowska (born 1981), Polish pole vaulter
- Artur Rogowski (born 1936), Polish sports shooter
- Bryant Rogowski (born 1970), American wrestler
- Cheryl Rogowski (born c. 1960), American farmer
- Franz Rogowski (born 1986), German actor
- Jan Rogowski (1913–1944), Polish Army officer
- Krzysztof Rogowski (boxer) (born 1981), Polish boxer
- Krzysztof Rogowski (equestrian) (born 1963), Polish equestrian
- Maria Rogowska-Falska (1877–1944), Polish teacher and activist
- Mark Rogowski (born 1966), American skateboarder
- Olivia Rogowska (born 1991), Australian tennis player
- Przemysław Rogowski (born 1980), Polish sprinter
- Ronald Rogowski (born 1944), American political scientist
- Walter Rogowski (1881–1947), German physicist
  - Rogowski coil, electrical device for measuring alternating current
