= Wacław Kopisto =

Polish Army officer

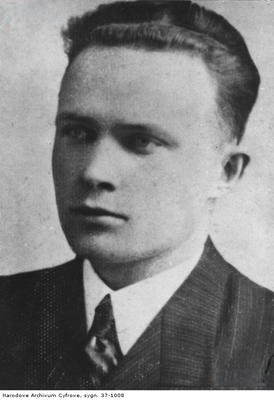
- Wacław Kopisto, nom de guerre Kra (NAC)
- Born: 8 February 1911; Józin, Starokonstantinov uyezd, Russian Empire
- Died: 23 February 1993 (aged 82); Rzeszów, Poland
- Other names: vel Wacław Jaworski
- Known for: Cichociemni

Major Wacław Kopisto a.k.a. Wacław Jaworski, nom de guerre Kra (8 February 1911 – 23 February 1993) was an officer of the Polish Army in interwar Poland, infantry captain, and an underground soldier of the elite Polish Cichociemni unit (the Silent Unseen) during the occupation of Poland in World War II.

== Military career ==
In 1934–35 Kopisto attended the Podchorąży military academy in Tarnopol. In 1939 he fought in the September Campaign defending Poland around the town of Podkarpacie. Following Poland's defeat by Nazi Germany and the Soviet Union, he escaped to Hungary, then to France, and finally Great Britain, where he became a Polish Armed Forces in the West parachutist. He was deployed back to Poland on the night of 2 September 1942 in the area of Grójec.

Kopisto took part in several spectacular military actions in Volhynia against the occupying German forces as well as the collaborationist units of the UPA. On 20 January 1943 he was involved in the rescue of Polish prisoners of war from Wachlarz of the Armia Krajowa who were being held and tortured at the Pińsk prison. The first platoon of Cichociemni rescuers drove undetected through the prison gate in an Opel car, while dressed in the SS uniforms and shouting at the guards in German. Once inside the compound, they shot the commandant who refused to cooperate. They opened the prison cells and released the inmates who were loaded onto a lorry they had requisitioned and they drove away ten minutes before the German reinforcements arrived. Two days later, on 22 January 1943 the SS executed 30 local civilian hostages in retaliation.

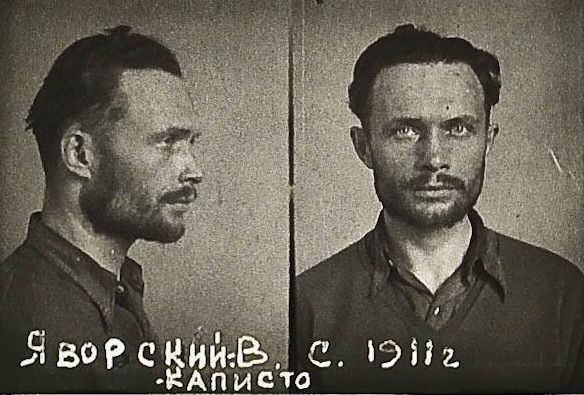
Kopisto after arrest by the Soviet NKVD, 1944

Kopisto served as commander of Kedyw in the Łuck Inspectorate, and organized Polish self-defence in Wołyń. He was captured by the Soviets in 1944 and sentenced to death, commuted to 10 years in Siberian lagers at Kolyma and Magadan. He returned to Poland in 1955, and settled in Rzeszów.

Wacław Kopisto died on 23 February 1993 and is buried in Rzeszów.

=== Recognition ===
Kopisto was awarded the Cross of Virtuti Militari and twice the Cross of Valour (Krzyż Walecznych). He received a posthumous promotion to Major. His biography titled Major Wacław Kopisto – Cichociemny Oficer AK Sybirak, written by Krzysztof A. Tochman, was published in Poland by Libra in 2010.

Kopisto was also the subject of a 1989 film documentary Cichociemni, about the Polish parachuters of World War II, made by Marek Widarski for WWFD Czołówka.

=== Forged Cichociemni claims by others ===
Martin Gray (born Mieczysław Grajewski), wrote in his 1971 autobiography For Those I Loved that he had participated in the raid on Pińsk prison. Doubt had been cast on a number of claims in the book, including whether he was a survivor of Treblinka, and when Kopisto was shown a wartime photograph of Gray in 1990, he said he had never met Gray during the war, nor had a man resembling the photograph of him ever belonged to their unit:

For the first time in my life I saw Martin Gray in a 1945 photo, which was published in March 1990 in Przekrój magazine ... There were only sixteen of us participating in the 1943 Pińsk raid, and he was not among us.

=== Bibliography ===
Brief selection of popular books about Cichociemni published mainly in the Polish language:

- Marek Celt (pen name of Tadeusz Chciuk-Celt), By parachute to Warsaw, London : Dorothy Crip and Co Ltd, 1945, OCLC 803700530
- Józef Gabriel Zabielski, Pierwszy skok , Publisher: Holborn, 1946, OCLC 749420603
- Various authors, Jerzy Iranek-Osmecki (trans.), Drogi cichociemnych, London: "Veritas", England, 1954, OCLC 504339138
- Piwonski, Cichociemni, Warszawa: Żółty Tygrys (the Yellow Tiger), 1957 (UC 74 A4 1957)
- Maurycy Gordon, Cichociemni, Poland: Ministerstwo Obrony Narodowej, 1958 OCLC 12955410
- Cezary Chlebowski, Pozdrówcie Góry Świętokrzyskie, Warszawa, Iskry 1968 (first edition) OCLC 21965712
- Jędrzej Tucholski, Cichociemni, Warszawa: "Pax", 1984. OCLC 830180418
- Przemysław Bystrzycki, Znak cichociemnych, Warszawa 1985. OCLC 18714678
- Jan Szatsznajder, Cichociemni. Z Polski do Polski, Wrocław: Krajowa Agencja Wydawnicza 1985. OCLC 719154926
- Alfred Paczkowski, Ankieta cichociemnego. Warszawa: Instytut Wydawniczy Pax, 1987. OCLC 22092790
- Cezary Chlebowski, Reportaż z tamtych dni. Warszawa, Krajowa Agencja Wydawnicza, 1988.
- Various authors, Drogi cichociemnych, Warszawa 1993, reprint. OCLC 16824031
- Hubert Królikowski, Wojskowa Formacja Specjalna GROM im. Cichociemnych Spadochroniarzy Armii Krajowej 1990–2000, Gdańsk 2001. (Chapter: "Tobie Ojczyzno - Cichociemni")
