= Drahichyn district =

District of Brest region, Belarus

Drahichyn district Драгічынскі раён (Belarusian) Дрогичинский район (Russian)
- District
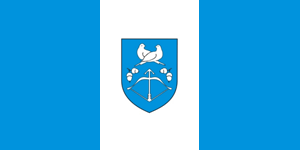
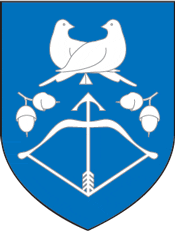
- Flag Coat of arms

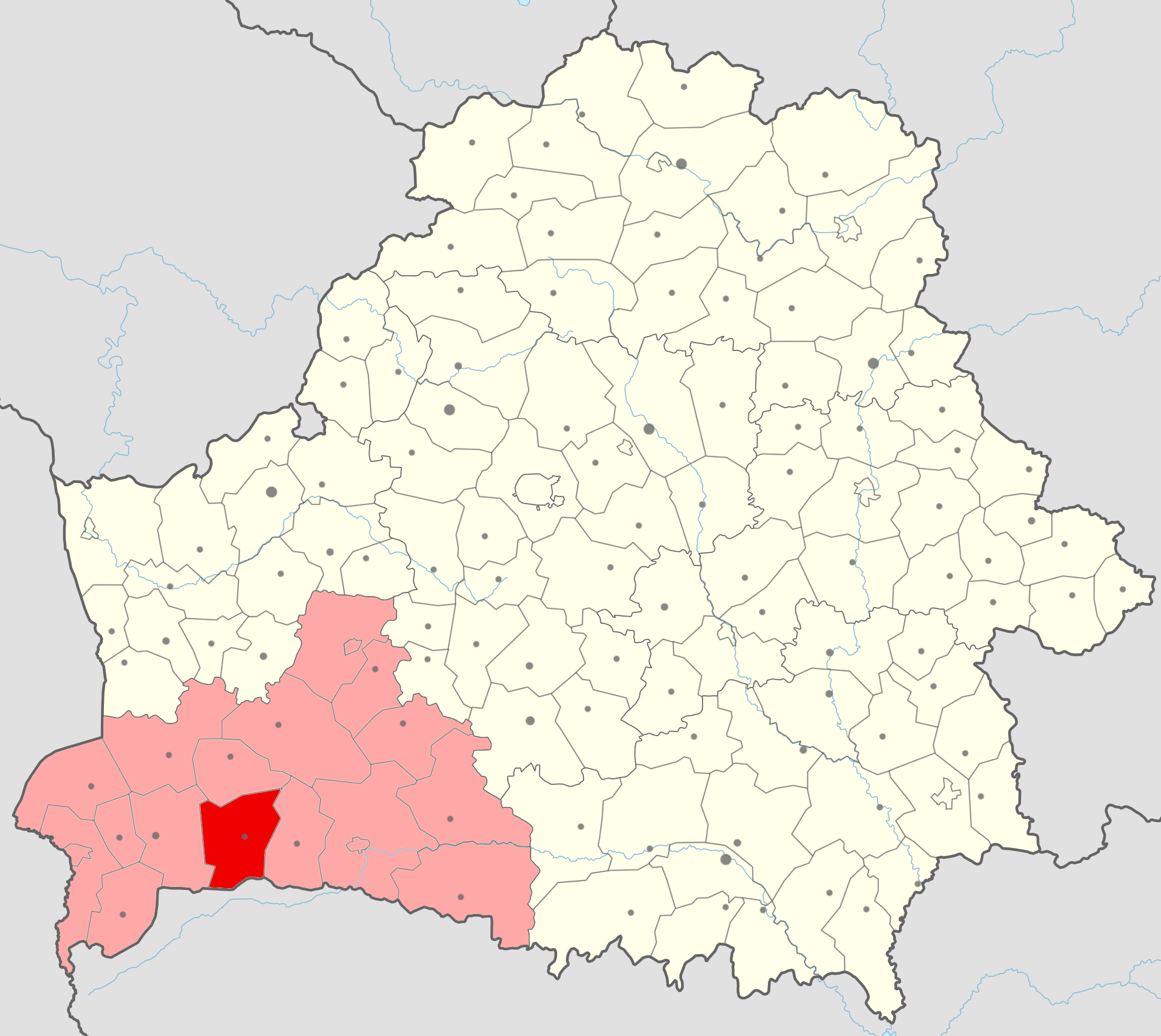
- Coordinates: 52°11′27″N 25°08′52″E
- Country: Belarus
- Region: Brest region
- Administrative center: Drahichyn

Area
  - District: 1,855.66 km^{2} (716.47 sq mi)

Population (2024)
  - District: 33,486
  - Density: 18.045/km^{2} (46.737/sq mi)
  - Urban: 16,232
  - Rural: 17,254
- Time zone: UTC+3 (MSK)
- Website: drogichin.brest-region.gov.by

Drahichyn district or Drahičyn district (Belarusian: Драгічынскі раён; Russian: Дрогичинский район) is a district (raion) of Brest region in Belarus. Its administrative center is Drahichyn. As of 2024, it has a population of 33,486.

== Demographics ==
At the time of the 2009 Belarusian census, Drahichyn district had a population of 42,948. Of these, 95.1% were of Belarusian, 2.1% Russian and 2.1% Ukrainian ethnicity. 82.1% spoke Belarusian and 16.0% Russian as their native language. In 2023, it had a population of 34,144.
