= Emilia Malessa =

Polish soldier, member of the Armia Krajowa

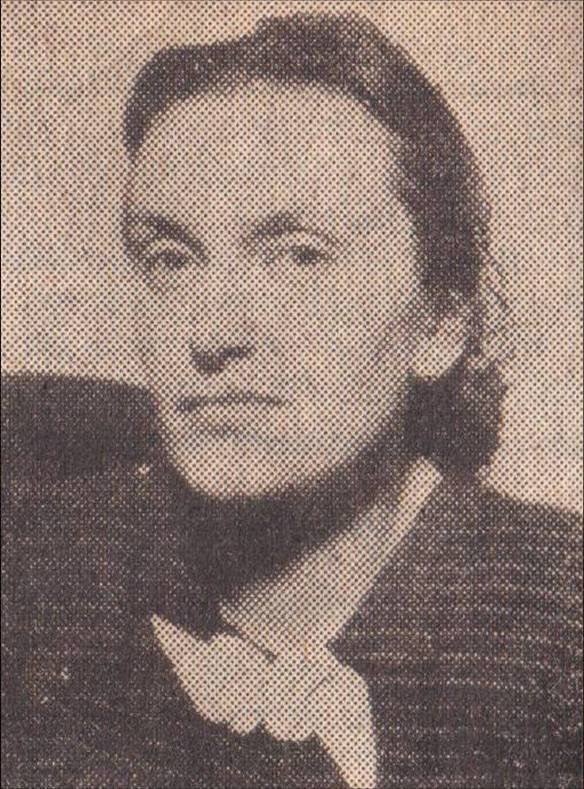
- Born: Emilia Izdebaka; 26 February 1909; Rostov Veliky, Yaroslavl Oblast
- Died: 5 June 1949 (aged 40)
- Buried: Brodnowski Cemetery, Warsaw (reburied in Powązki Military Cemetery)
- Allegiance: Second Polish Republic; Polish Underground State; Freedom and Independence
- Service years: 1939-1949
- Rank: Captain
- Conflicts: Second World War; Anti-communist resistance in Poland 1944-1953

Emilia Malessa, née Izdebska (noms de guerre: Marcysia, Miłasza, Maniuta; 26 February 1909 in Rostov – 5 June 1949), was a Polish soldier, member of the Home Army with the rank of Captain, participant in the Warsaw Uprising, member of the underground anti-communist organization Freedom and Independence (WiN), and a "cavalier" of the Order of Virtuti Militari.

== Early life ==
Malessa was born in the Russian Empire to Władysław and Maria (Krukowska) Izdebski. After moving back to Poland, she finished a trade school in Łuck in 1924. She worked in the Main Statistical Office in Warsaw and afterward moved to Gdynia. In 1935, she married Wojciech Malessa, but divorced him two years later.

== World War II ==
After the German invasion of Poland, she volunteered for the Women's Volunteer Services and took part in the September campaign. She was a driver and organizer of logistical supplies and field hospitals for the Polish 19th Infantry Division.

In mid-October, she joined the underground organizations Service for Poland's Victory (SZP) and Union of Armed Struggle (ZWZ), and later of the Polish Home Army (AK). Until the end of the German occupation, she was the chief of the communication cell "Zagroda" attached to the Main Headquarters of the AK. Sometime in 1943, she was married again to Jan Piwnik ("Ponury"), one of the Cichociemni and a famous anti-Nazi partisan commander.

Malessa took part in the Warsaw Uprising and afterward escaped from a transport that was taking the defeated insurrectionists to labor camps in Germany. She made her way to Kraków where she took part in the operation, run by Elżbieta Zawacka, pseudonym '"Zo", that brought the courier Jan Nowak-Jeziorański from Great Britain to Poland.

== Anti-Communist activities ==
After the Home Army was disbanded in January 1945, Malessa joined the anti-communist resistance organization NIE. After NIE ceased in May 1945, she was a member of the leadership committee of another anti-communist movement, Freedom and Independence (WiN). In late 1945, she expressed the desire to leave the organization. While she was in the process of being officially discharged, she was arrested by the Communist secret police (UB) who had managed to penetrate the organization's ranks.

During the interrogations that followed her arrest, she trusted the "officer's word of honor" given by the UB chief Józef Różański that if she revealed the command and structure of Freedom and Independence, none of the persons she mentioned would be arrested, and further persecution directed at former AK soldiers stopped. With the permission of her commanders, Col. Jan Rzepecki and Col. Antoni Sanojcy who also took Różański's promise in good faith, she gave the UB a list of names of members and commanders of the organization. They were quickly arrested and Malessa, who was still in prison, began a hunger strike as a protest against the breaking of the promises. On 14 February 1947, she was sentenced to two years incarcerations. A few days later, she was "pardoned" by the President of communist Poland, Bolesław Bierut and released. She continued her hunger strike in front of the walls of the Mokotów Prison where those she had named were imprisoned.

She immediately began making efforts to have the authorities fulfill the promises they had made and to have the soldiers of the underground released from prison. She wrote letters to Bierut, to the Minister of Security, Stanisław Radkiewicz, and to Różański. Her efforts were unsuccessful; more and more WiN soldiers were arrested and sentenced to long prison terms or death.

== Death ==
Shunned by the remains of the anti-communist underground, Malessa committed suicide on 5 June 1949. She was initially buried at Brodnowski Cemetery in Warsaw. On 19 September 2005, her body was exhumed and after a Mass, the urn with her remains was re-buried at the Powązki Military Cemetery.
