= Wachlarz =

Wachlarz (Polish pronunciation: [ˈvaxlaʂ], folding fan) was a Polish World War II resistance organization formed by the Armia Krajowa for sabotage duties behind the German Eastern Front, outside of the Polish borders. Its commanders were Lieutenant Colonel Jan Włodarkiewicz (until 1942) and Lieutenant Colonel Adam Remigiusz Grocholski.

Originally formed in 1941, shortly after the outbreak (22 June 1941) of the German-Soviet War, the organisation was subordinate to Związek Walki Zbrojnej and bore the cryptonym 18, later changed to 27. The final name, Wachlarz, resulted from the subdivision of the organisation into several branches, each trying to spread its influence from certain portions of the Polish border deep into Soviet territory. Wachlarz had five different sectors, each acting independently and forming along several main supply-lines of the German war machine:

1. Lwów-Tarnopol-Zhmerynka-Dnipropetrovsk
2. Równe-Zhytomir-Kiev
3. Brześć nad Bugiem-Pińsk-Homel
4. Lida-Minsk-Borisov-Orsha
5. Wilno-Daugavpils-Polotsk

The main aim of the organisation was to prepare reconnaissance, intelligence, sabotage and diversion between the Eastern Front and the prewar Polish borders from the Baltic Sea to southern Ukraine. The organisation was to be prepared to isolate the German frontlines by cutting the supply lines and disrupting troop movement during the planned pan-Polish national uprising. Its aim was to separate the German army from its supply depots and to allow the Polish underground forces to liberate Poland while the Germans in the Soviets were crushed from both the East and the West.

== Operations ==
Initially the unit was formed of officers of the Tajna Armia Polska organization, incorporated into the ZWZ in 1941. After its formation, the Armia Krajowa took the command over Wachlarz. Although at its height the organization had roughly 1000 highly trained members, most of whom were trained in commando warfare as the Cichociemni and after 1942 it carried over more than 100 major acts of sabotage, including the destruction of over 30 major supply depots, its effectiveness was seriously hindered by both the Gestapo and the Soviet partisans. The most notable success was cutting all railway lines leading to and from Minsk in May 1942 and a similar action in Brześć in August of the same year. Between December 1942 and February of the following year a large part of the 4th sector was arrested by the Gestapo. They were liberated from the Pińsk prison in a successful rescue action by sixteen Cichociemni parachuters under the command of Jan Piwnik according to Captain Wacław Kopisto who was one of them, all dressed in German uniforms. (see also 1943 Pinsk Prison Raid).

Before March 1943 all units of Wachlarz were incorporated into the KeDyw underground organization.
