= Jan Rogowski =

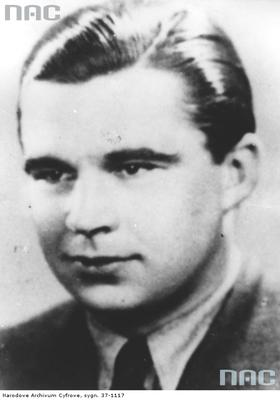
Jan Rogowski

Jan Rogowski (cichociemny) (noms de guerre Jan Szulak, Piotr Jaczynski, Julian Koba, Zbigniew Plecki, Piotr Pomerski, Stefan Zawidzki, Czarka, Kacz) was a soldier of the Polish Army, Polish Armed Forces in the West and the Home Army. A member of the elite special operations group, Cichociemni, Rogowski was sent from Great Britain to occupied Poland. Captured by the Germans, he was murdered by the Gestapo on February 16, 1944, in Radom.

== Biography ==
Born on November 21, 1913, in Warsaw, he frequently changed locations as a child, living in Kamieniec Podolski, Zakopane, Romania, to finally return to Warsaw, where he attended the Jan Zamoyski Middle School. In 1926, Rogowski moved to Rawicz, to study at the Third Cadet Corps. After graduation (1932), he studied at Warsaw University of Technology and Warsaw University of Life Sciences, but did not complete his studies.

Rogowski was the son of a nobleman Boleslaw and Julia née Lipkowska. His father was a landowner in Russian Podolia and Ukraine. As officer of the Imperial Russian Army, he was killed in action in Bessarabia, in 1916. In 1933 - 1934, Jan attended the School of Artillery Reserve Officers at Wlodzimierz Wolynski, and in 1935, he took a job at the Ursus Factory. Some time in the late 1930s, je moved to Volhynia, to oversee the real estate of Chinocze, located near Sarny. He was an active member of the National Party and Camp of Great Poland.

In the 1939 Invasion of Poland, he served as platoon commandant of the 50th Kresy Rifle Infantry Regiment. On September 11, 1939, Rogowski was transferred to the unit of Major Leon Fudakowski, and on November 19, he crossed the Polish-Hungarian border. In January 1940, he reached France, where he was attached to the 3rd Light Artillery Regiment. In June 1940 Rogowski was evacuated to Great Britain, where he served in the 1st Rifle Brigade, and volunteered to be dropped over occupied Poland.

After training, he became a member of the elite special operations group, Cichociemni, and was dropped over Poland in the night of March 3/4, 1942, during Operation Collar, carried out by Captain Antoni Voelnagel. The drop took place 9 kilometers northwest of Wyszkow, and soon afterwards, Rogowski was attached to the Second Unit of Wachlarz, as deputy of Jan Piwnik. He joined his unit in Rowne, Volhynia, in June 1942. In July of that year, both Rogowski and Piwnik were captured by the Germans, and sent to prison. They managed to escape, and reached Warsaw in September.

After the dissolution of Wachlarz (March 1943), Rogowski joined Kedyw, as commander of Kielce Area. He took part in several raids, including the legendary Pinsk Prison Raid (January 1943). In the night of July 2/3, 1943, Rogowski, together with his unit, attacked a German train near Suchedniow. During another raid (July 12/13), he was seriously wounded. Jan Rogowski was arrested by the Gestapo on January 3, 1944, while crossing the Pilica river bridge in Bialobrzegi. Together with Andrzej Orwid-Eljaszewicz, he was driving a truck with winter supplies for the local Home Army units, and the Germans were informed by a Gestapo agent, Jerzy Wojnowski (“Motor”). Taken to a Gestapo prison in Radom, Rogowski was tortured, but did not reveal any information to his oppressors. On February 16, 1944, he was sentenced to death and immediately shot.

Jan Rogowski was awarded Silver Cross of the Virtuti Militari (Nr. 13633), and the Cross of Valour (Poland).

In 1980 in St. Hyacinth's Church, Warsaw, a commemorative tablet, dedicated to Cichociemni was unveiled, with 110 names, including Jan Rogowski. On May 3, 1993, in Bialobrzegi, in front of a parish church, a monument, commemorating the arrest of Rogowski and Orwid-Eljaszewicz was unveiled.

== Sources ==
- Krzysztof A. Tochman: Słownik biograficzny cichociemnych. T. 1. Oleśnica: Firma „Kasperowicz – Meble”, 1994
- Jędrzej Tucholski: Cichociemni. Warszawa: Instytut Wydawniczy PAX, 1984,
- Jędrzej Tucholski: Cichociemni 1941–1945 – Sylwetki spadochroniarzy. Wojskowy Instytut Historyczny, 1984

== See also ==
- Armia Krajowa
- GROM
- KeDyw
- Polish government in exile
- Special Operations Executive
- Stanisław Sosabowski
