= Drahichyn =

Town in Brest Region, Belarus

Drahichyn Драгічын (Belarusian) Дрогичин (Russian)
- Town
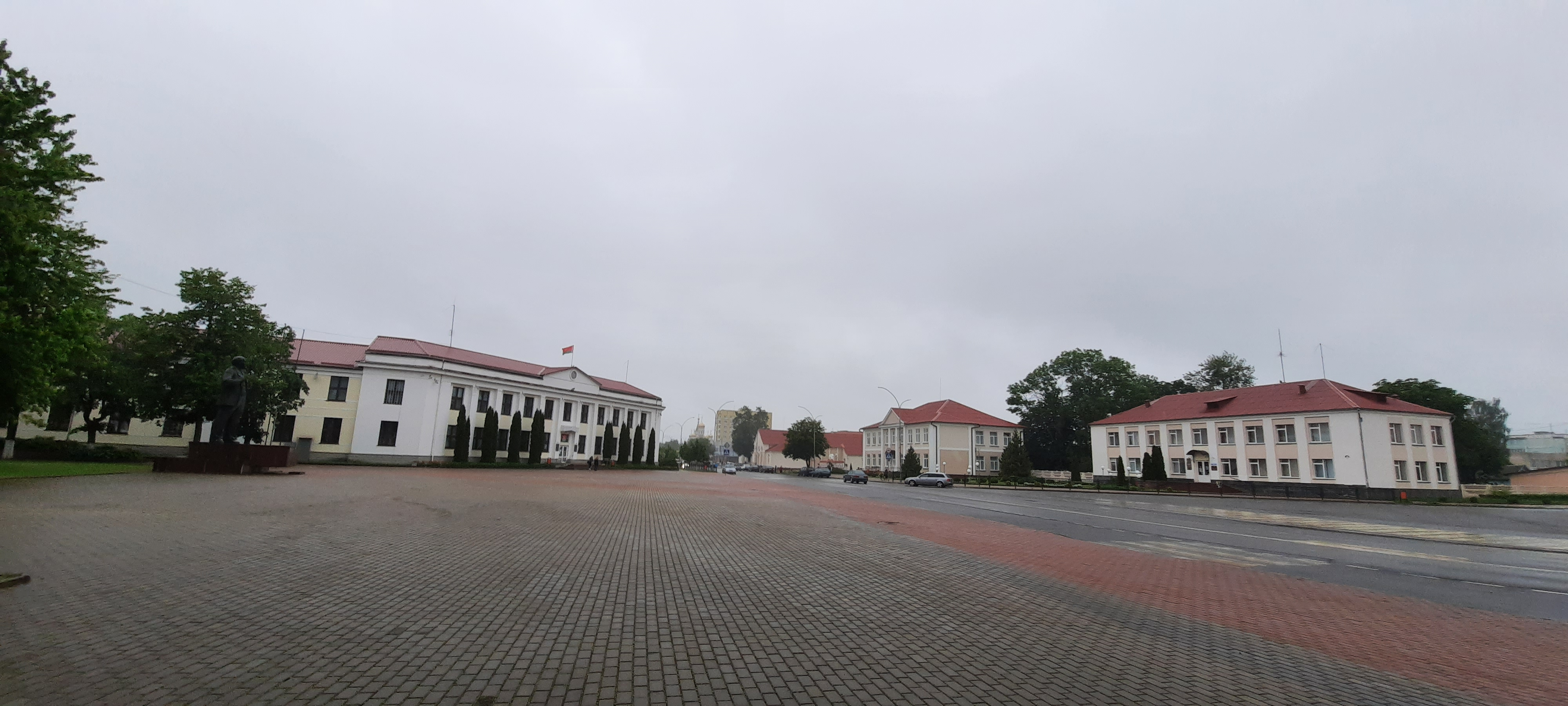

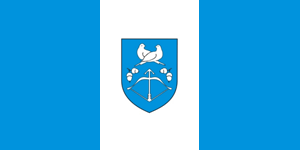
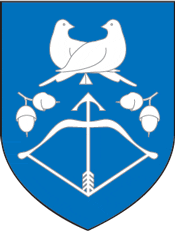
- Flag Coat of arms

- Location in Belarus
- Coordinates: 52°11′N 25°09′E
- Country: Belarus
- Region: Brest Region
- District: Drahichyn District
- First mentioned: 1452

Population (2026)
  - Total: 14,659
- Time zone: UTC+3 (MSK)
- Postal code: 225830
- Area code: +375 1644
- License plate: 1

Drahichyn, or Drogichin, (Note: Belarusian: Драгічын, romanized: Drahičyn, local pronunciation: [doroˈɦɪt͡ʃenʲ];; Russian: Дрогичин, romanized: Drogichin; Polish: Drohiczyn; Yiddish: דראהיטשין, romanized: Drohichin.) is a town in Brest Region, in south-western Belarus. It serves as the administrative center of Drahichyn District. As of 2026, it has a population of 14,659.

== History ==
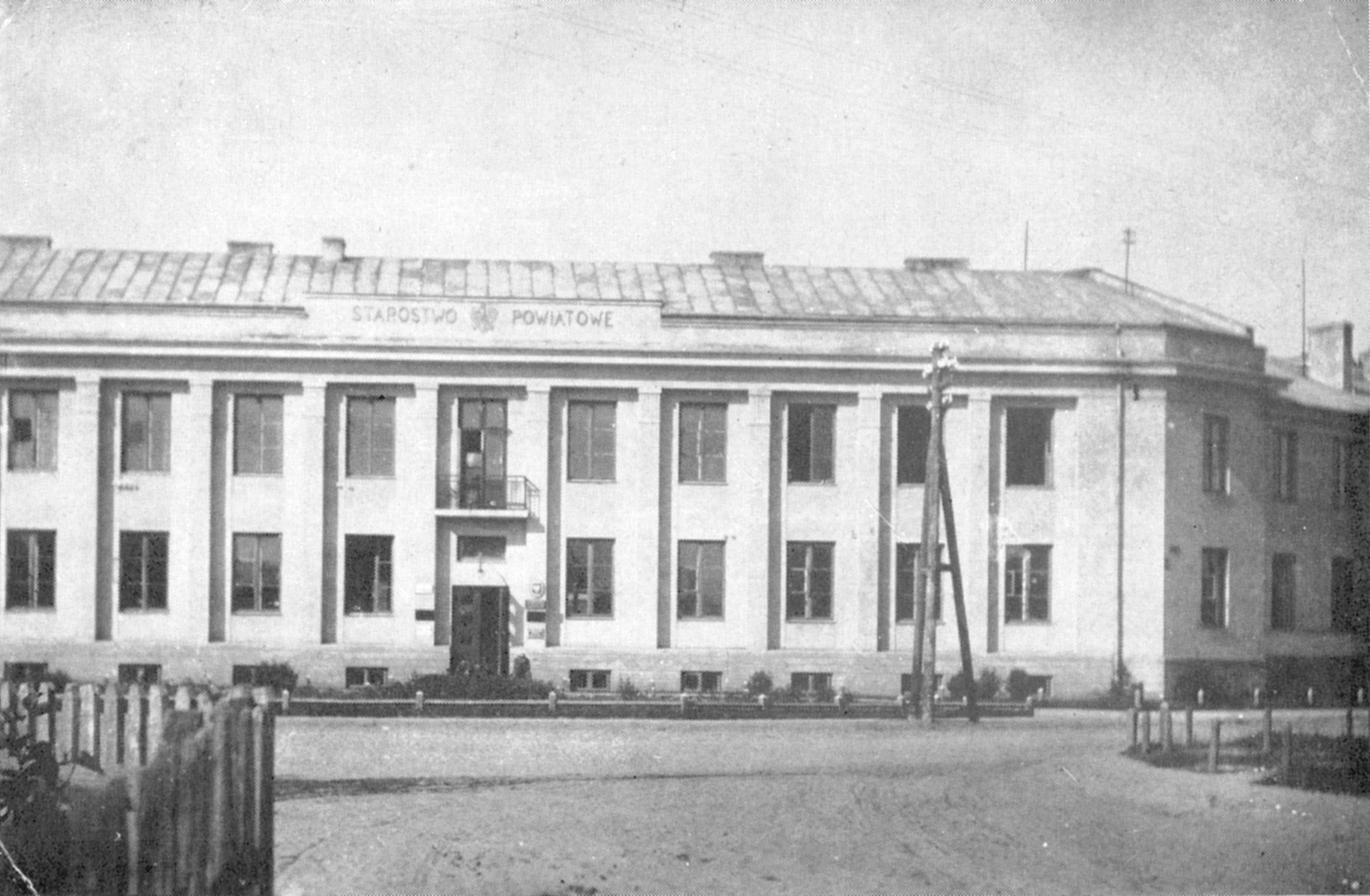
Drohiczyn County seat in the 1930s

The settlement was first mentioned as Dowieczorowicze in 1452.

The Treaty of Drohiczyn between the city of Riga and the Polish–Lithuanian Commonwealth was signed in Drohiczyn in 1518.

It was located in the Pinsk County in the Brześć Litewski Voivodeship of the Polish–Lithuanian Commonwealth until the Third Partition of Poland in 1795, when it was annexed by Russia. During World War I, the town was occupied by Germany from 1915 to 1918. After the war, it was part of reborn Poland, within which it was a county seat within the Polesie Voivodeship of Poland. At the time the town was also known as Drohiczyn Poleski, after the region of Polesie within which it is located, in order to distinguish it from the more historically significant town of Drohiczyn in Podlachia.

Following the invasion of Poland in September 1939 at the beginning of World War II, the town was first occupied by the Soviet Union until 1941, and then by Nazi Germany until 1944. Several Poles who were either born or lived and worked in Drohiczyn were murdered by the Russians in the Katyn massacre in 1940. The German occupiers established and operated a Nazi prison, a forced labour battalion for Jews, and a ghetto for local Jews during the Holocaust. In January 1943, Polish partisans liberated in the 1943 Pinsk Prison raid hid in the town. In 1944 it was re-occupied by the Soviet Union, which eventually annexed it from Poland in 1945.
