= Yewlashy =

Village in Grodno Region, Belarus

Yewlashy Еўлашы (Belarusian)
- Village
- Location within Belarus
- Coordinates: 53°38′07″N 24°34′23″E
- Country: Belarus
- Region: Grodno Region
- District: Shchuchyn District

Yewlashy (Belarusian: Еўлашы, romanized: Jeŭlašy; Russian: Евлаши, romanized: Yevlashi; Polish: Jewłasze) is a village in Shchuchyn District, Grodno Region, Belarus.

== History ==
Historical population
Year	Pop.	±%
1866	181	—
1921	247	+36.5%

In the interwar period, the village was situated in Poland, in the Nowogródek Voivodeship, in Lida County, in Dziembrów Commune. According to the 1921 census, the population was 98.8% Polish and 1.2% Belarusian. After the Soviet invasion of Poland in 1939, the village became part of the BSSR. From 1941 to 1944 it was under German occupation. Then the village was again in the BSSR. From 1991 it was part of the Republic of Belarus.

On June 16, 1944, Jan Piwnik "Ponury" died in the fight against the Germans near Yewlashy. His body was buried on June 18 at the cemetery in Wawiorka and only in 1988 brought to Poland. A monument was erected next to the forest in Yewlashy. It has an inscription "To Polish soldiers and officers who died in the fight against German-fascist invaders during World War II in the Shchuchyn district". It is in the hamlet of Bogdany. In June 2022, the plaque was removed by unknown perpetrators.
