= Jan Piwnik =

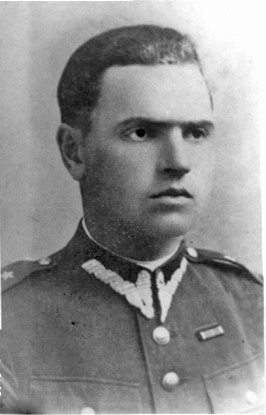
- Jan Piwnik
- Born: 31 August 1912; Janowice, Poland
- Died: 16 June 1944 (aged 31); Yewlashy, Poland, today Belarus
- Military career
- Service years: 1939
- Rank: Colonel
- Nickname: Ponury
- Awards: Virtuti Militari Grand Cross, Polonia Restituta Krzyz Walecznych, twice

Jan Piwnik (31 August 1912 – 16 June 1944) was a Polish World War II soldier, a cichociemny and a notable leader of the Home Army in the Świętokrzyskie Mountains. He used the nickname Ponury ("Gloomy" or "Grim") and Donat.

== Biography ==
Jan Piwnik was born on 31 August 1912 in the village of Janowice, Kielce Voivodeship (1919–39), Second Polish Republic, to Jan, a farmer, and Zofia (Kłonica) Piwnik.

In 1933, he graduated from a reserve NCO artillery school in Włodzimierz Wołyński. In 1935, he joined the Polish police, where he served as an officer.

Mobilized in 1939, during the invasion of Poland by Germany, he commanded a motorized unit of the police. When the Soviets also attacked, on 23 September he and his unit crossed the Hungarian border and were interned. Piwnik managed to escape from the internment camp. In November 1939, he reported to the Polish Government in Exile in Paris. He joined the Polish Army, reconstituted in France at that time and was assigned to the 4th Rifle Brigade (en cadre).

After evacuation to Great Britain following the fall of France, he joined the Polish 1st Independent Parachute Brigade under General Stanisław Sosabowski.

Piwnik was informed of creation of the Cichociemni formation, which he joined. After receiving extensive training, he was transported to Poland on 7 November 1941. There he joined the Home Army and served at various posts. In the summer of 1942, he was assigned to head one of the Wachlarz units operating from Równe in eastern Poland (now Rivne in western Ukraine). Arrested by the Gestapo, he managed to escape from the German prison and reached Warsaw. There he was ordered to prepare a mission to rescue his fellow Wachlarz members from the prison in Pińsk. On 18 January 1943, he and his men successfully stormed the German prison, liberated all the prisoners and hostages, and transported them safely to Warsaw.

For his action, he was promoted to ensign and in March was assigned to the Radom-Kielce Home Army Area as the commanding officer of all Kedyw forces there. As the hilly and densely forested terrain was ideal for partisan warfare, Piwnik started to organise a large partisan unit out of many smaller, pre-existing groups. His unit, based in the forests around Wykus, was named the Home Army Partisan Group "Ponury".

One of the most successful units in the area, it disrupted German transport and harassed German garrisons. However, a German counter-attack caused heavy losses to his unit and it was forced to move eastwards, towards the forests near Jeleniów.

In December 1943, Piwnik was dismissed from command of the partisan units and in February of the following year, he was assigned to the Nowogródek Home Army Area, where he formed a small partisan unit. After the start of the Operation Tempest, his unit was reformed into the VII battalion of the 77th Home Army Infantry Regiment and took part in many successful actions behind German lines. He was killed in action in a successful attack against German troops near the village of Yewlashy near Vilnius on 16 June 1944. He had been shot in the back while retrieving a wounded comrade by a German deserter.

== Posthumous ==
Piwnik was posthumously promoted to the rank of major and next to colonel (by a Polish Minister of Defense, in year 2012). After the war, his life became part of the popular culture of the Świętokrzyskie area. In July 1988, his body was exhumed and transferred to a crypt in the Cistercian monastery in Wąchock.

== Family ==
In November 1943, Piwnik married Emilia Malessa.

== Honours and awards ==
- Gold Cross of the Virtuti Militari, previously awarded the Silver Cross
- Grand Cross of the Order of Polonia Restituta (posthumously, 2010)
- Cross of Valour (twice)

== Family ==
Barbara Piwnik, a Polish judge and former minister of justice, is Jan Piwnik's niece.

== See also ==
- Armia Krajowa
