= Pinsk =

City in Brest Region, Belarus

Pinsk Пінск (Belarusian) Пинск (Russian) Pińsk (Polish)
- City
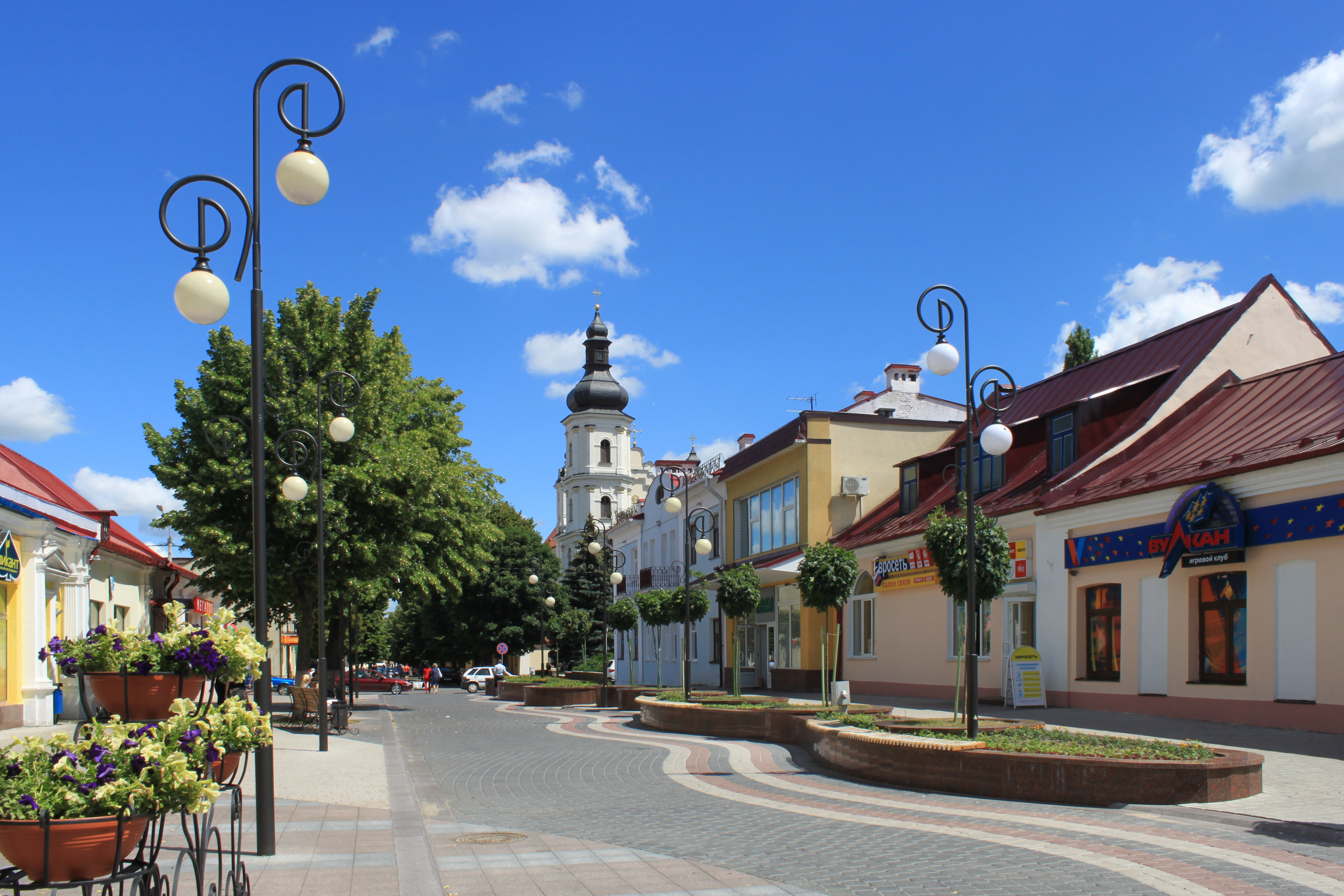
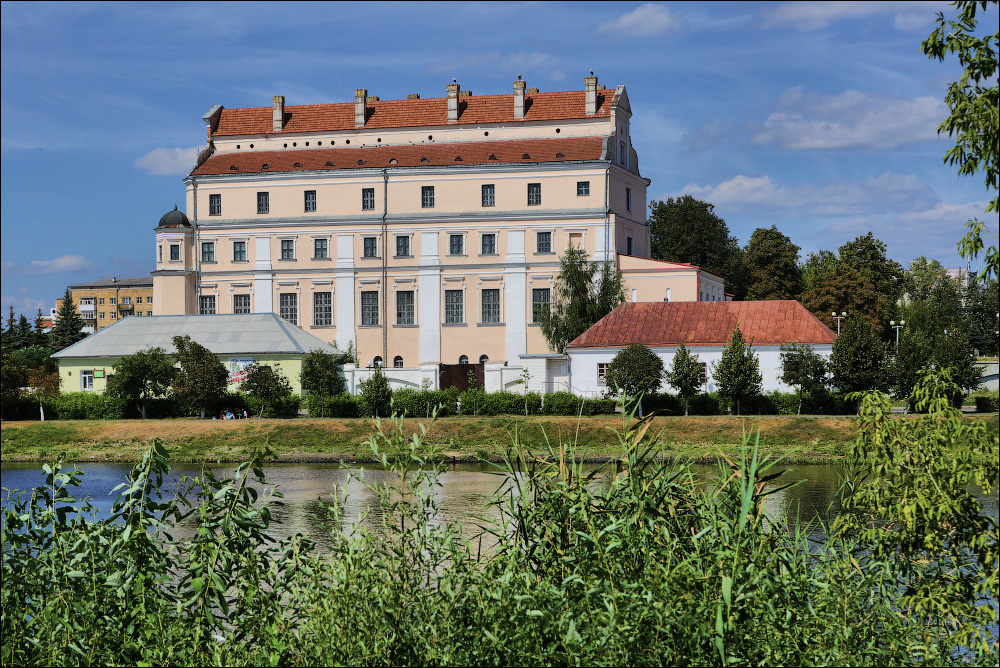
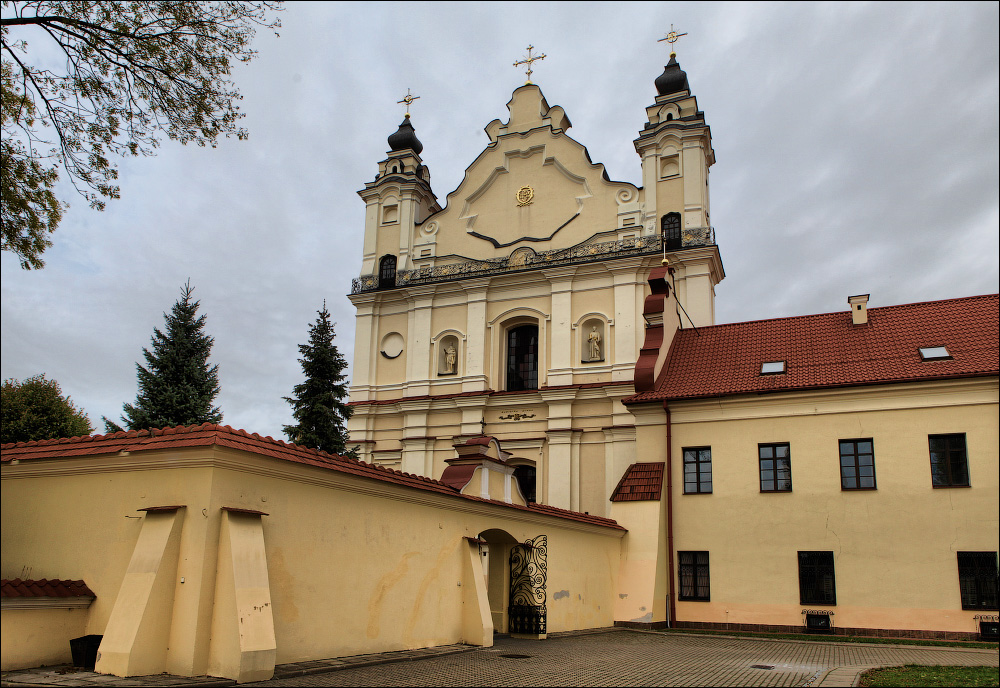
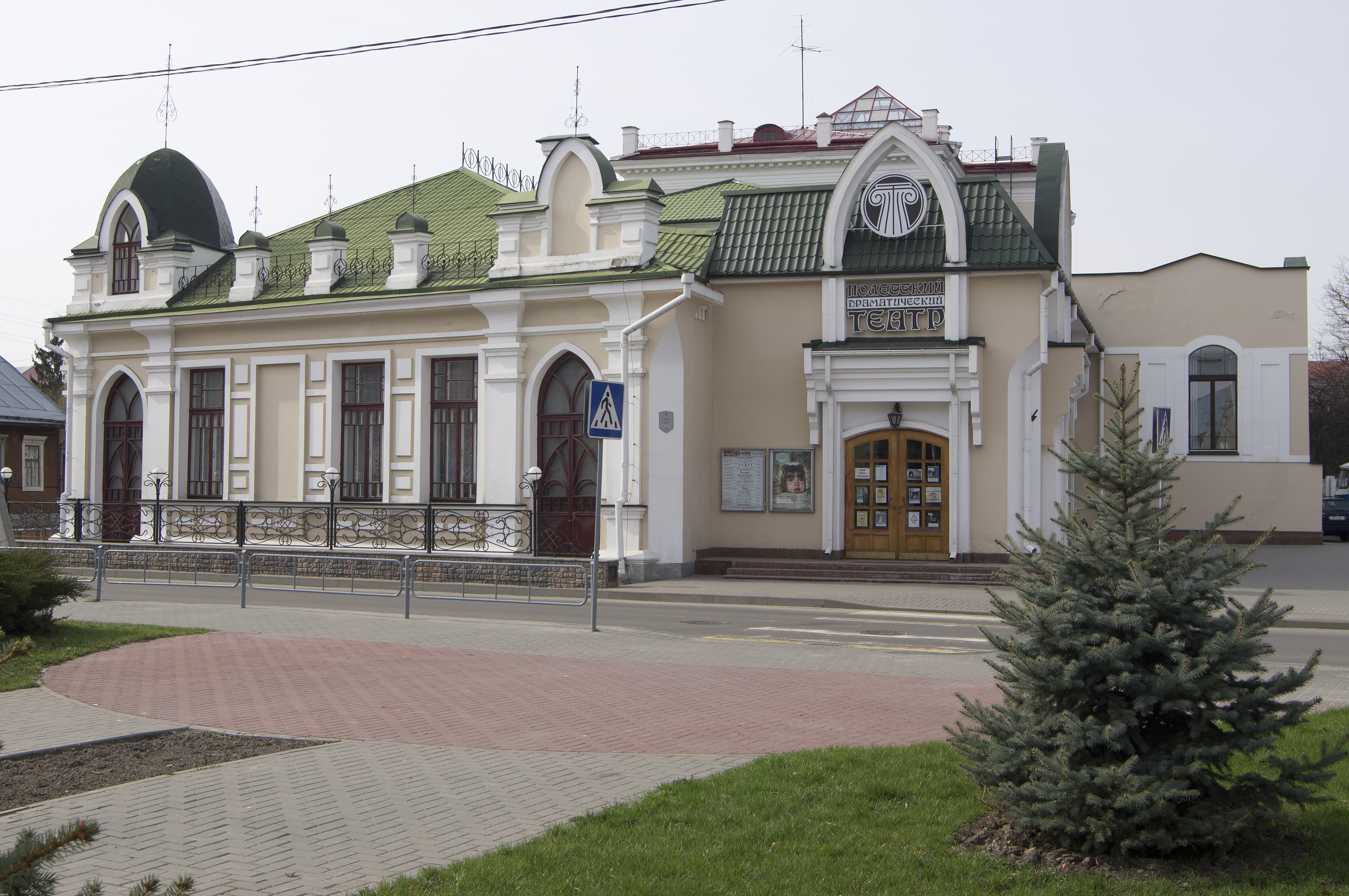
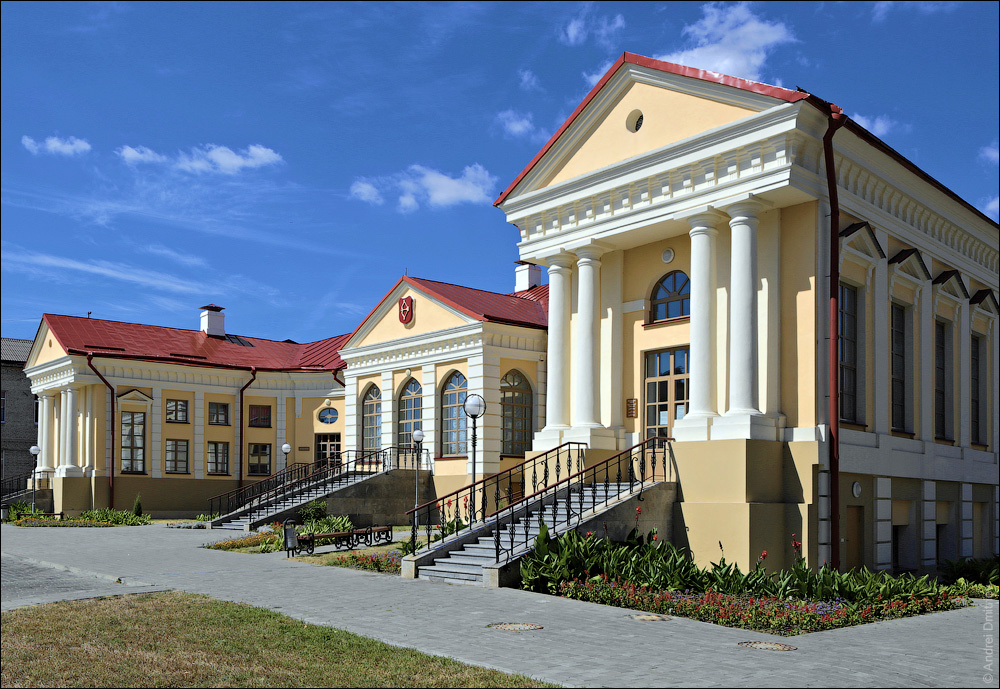
- City center Jesuit Collegium Assumption Cathedral Paliessie Drama Theater Butrymowicz Palace

- Flag Coat of arms

- Location of Pinsk in Belarus
- Coordinates: 52°06′55″N 26°06′11″E
- Country: Belarus
- Region: Brest Region
- First mentioned: 1097

Area
  - Total: 51.48 km^{2} (19.88 sq mi)
- Elevation: 141 m (463 ft)

Population (2026)
  - Total: 123,283
  - Density: 2,395/km^{2} (6,202/sq mi)
- Time zone: UTC+3 (MSK)
- Postal codes: 225700, 225710, 225716, 225745
- Area code: +375 165
- License plate: 1
- Website: Official website

Pinsk (Note: Belarusian: Пінск; Russian: Пинск, IPA: [pʲinsk]; Polish: Pińsk; Ukrainian: Пінськ, Пинськ, Ukrainian pronunciation: [ˈpɪns⁽ʲ⁾k]; Yiddish: פינסק.) is a city in Brest Region, in southern Belarus. It serves as the administrative center of Pinsk District, though it is administratively separated from the district. It is located in the historical region of Polesia, at the confluence of the Pina River and the Pripyat River. The region was known as the Pinsk Marshes and is southwest of Minsk. As of 2026, it has a population of 123,283.

First mentioned in 1097, Pinsk is a city with almost a thousand years of history. It is one of the largest and historically most important cities of the historic and geographic region of Polesia. Its historic importance is reflected in its Baroque and Neoclassical landmarks.

== History ==
=== Medieval period ===
It was first mentioned in 1097 by Nestor the Chronicler. In the High Middle Ages, Pinsk often passed between various principalities of Kievan Rus', including Kiev, Turov, and Volhynia, as well as the Grand Duchy of Lithuania. Pinsk was destroyed during the Mongol invasion of Europe in 1240. In 1241, the Orthodox diocese was moved from Turov to Pinsk. Afterwards, it was captured by Lithuanian duke Erdvilas, and Pinsk became a fief of Lithuania. Lithuanian duke Vaišvilkas found refuge at a local monastery after his father Mindaugas was assassinated. In 1274, Pinsk along with the Ruthenian princes and Tatars, fought against Lithuania.

By 1320, Pinsk was incorporated into the Grand Duchy of Lithuania. It remained ruled by local lines of the Gediminids. From 1386, it was part of the Polish–Lithuanian union. In 1396, a Catholic church and a Franciscan monastery were erected.

=== Early modern period ===
After the extinction of the local princely line in 1521, Pinsk became a royal possession of Sigismund I the Old, who then handed it over to his wife Queen Bona Sforza in 1523. Bona Sforza ordered the construction of a canal connecting Pinsk and Stetyczów. The city limits were expanded, and the city flourished. In 1527, invading Tatars ravaged the surrounding area, but they did not capture the city and were defeated nearby the Lithuanian forces led by Hetman Konstanty Ostrogski. From 1569, it was part of the Polish–Lithuanian Commonwealth. In 1569, Pinsk became a county seat. In 1581, King Stephen Báthory granted Pinsk Magdeburg city rights and its coat of arms.

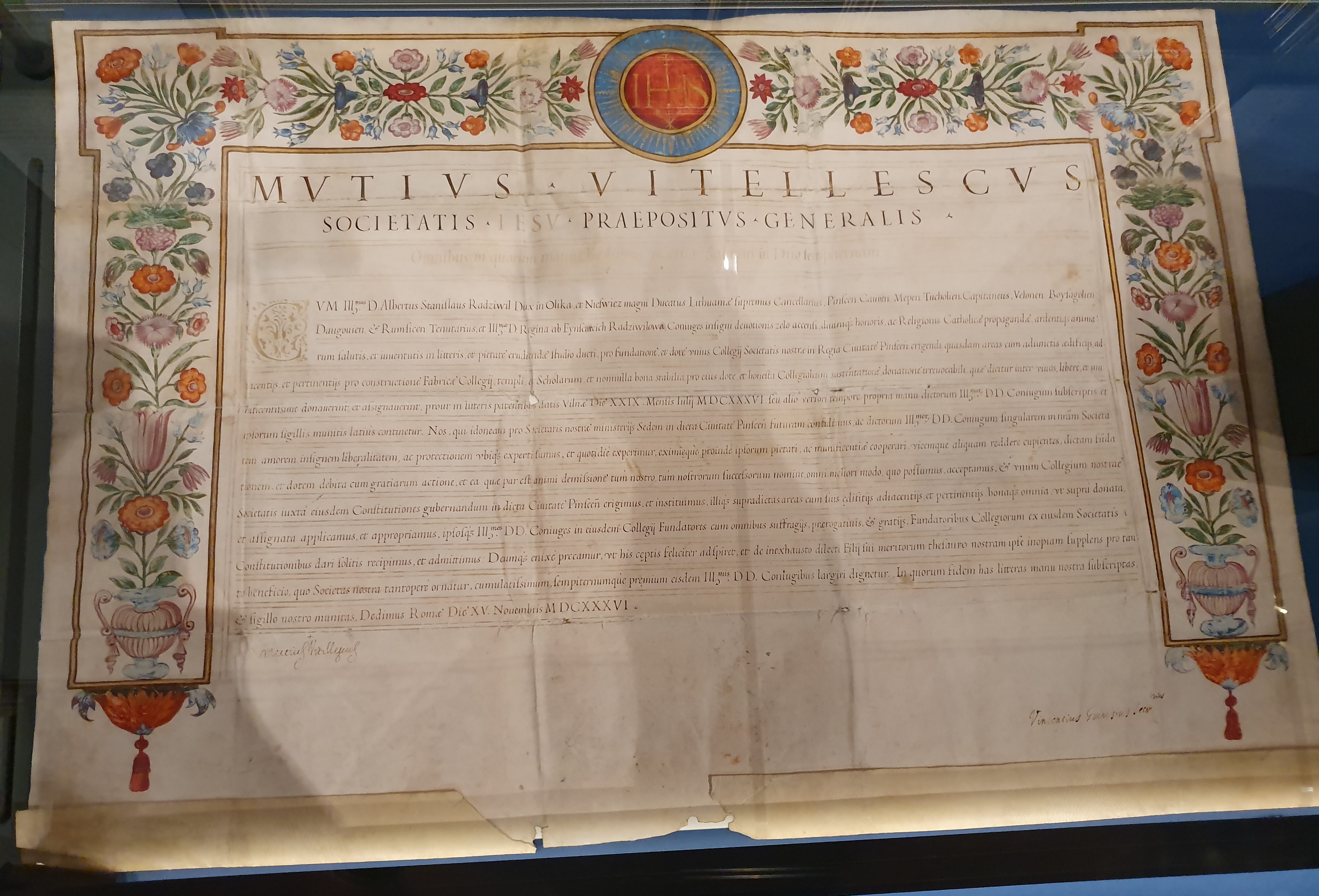
Document confirming grants made by Albrycht Stanisław Radziwiłł to the Jesuit college in Pinsk, 1636

From the reign of Sigismund III Vasa onwards, several new monasteries were established. In 1631, Albrycht Stanisław Radziwiłł brought Jesuits to Pinsk and established a Jesuit monastery and college. Poet Adam Naruszewicz attended the college. The Jesuits operated a pharmacy and a printing house in Pinsk. In 1642–1646, Saint Andrew Bobola stayed in the Jesuit monastery in Pinsk and nearby, conducting evangelistic activity. In 1633, King Władysław IV Vasa authorised the construction of an Orthodox monastery with a school and hospital.

In 1648, local Orthodox residents let the Cossacks into the city and joined their rebellion. The rebels plundered local Catholic churches, and carried out a massacre of Catholic clergy and Jews. Lithuanian forces laid siege to the city and recaptured it. A fire broke out during the battle, destroying many houses and several churches.

During the Deluge, in 1655, the Russians and Cossacks attacked the city and murdered many inhabitants. In mid-May 1657, Zdanowicz's Cossacks (about 2,000 in total) destroyed the city and murdered many Roman Catholics. The Jesuits fled the city, among them Fr. Simon Maffon and Saint Andrew Bobola, but were ultimately also murdered. In 1660, the Cossacks attacked Pinsk, robbed a Jesuit college and church, and murdered, among others, Fr. Eustachy Piliński. The Jesuits returned to Pinsk in 1662. However, the monastery suffered a fire the next year.

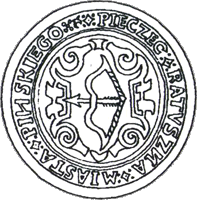
17th-century seal of Pinsk

Later, new monasteries were founded, including of the Dominicans in 1666, Apostolic Union of Secular Priests in 1695, Bernardines in 1717, Carmelites in 1734, and Mariavite nuns in 1756.

In 1690, the Karolin settlement was founded by Jan Karol Dolski. In 1695, Michał Serwacy Wiśniowiecki built a church and castle in the Karolin suburb. During the Swedish invasion of Poland from May 5 to June 3, 1706, Pinsk was captured by King Charles XII of Sweden, and the castle of Michał Serwacy Wiśniowiecki was blown up. In 1707, the city was captured by the army of General Halast and General Hołowina. In 1709–1710 and in 1716, the city was hit by an epidemic with thousands of victims. The Oginski Canal and Royal Canal were constructed in 1767 and 1775, respectively. In 1784, Pinsk was visited by King Stanisław August Poniatowski. After the suppression of the Jesuits, the college continued its work, and the Franciscans assumed responsibility for it.

=== Late modern period ===
In 1793, Pinsk was annexed by Russia in the Second Partition of Poland. In 1795, the Catholic Diocese of Pinsk was established (previously Pinsk was in the diocese of Lutsk). However, it was dissolved in 1799, and the seat moved to Minsk. In 1796, the Uniate diocese of Pinsk was dissolved. In 1799, Karolina was included within Pinsk. In July 1812, Pinsk was captured by Napoleon's army during the French invasion of Russia.

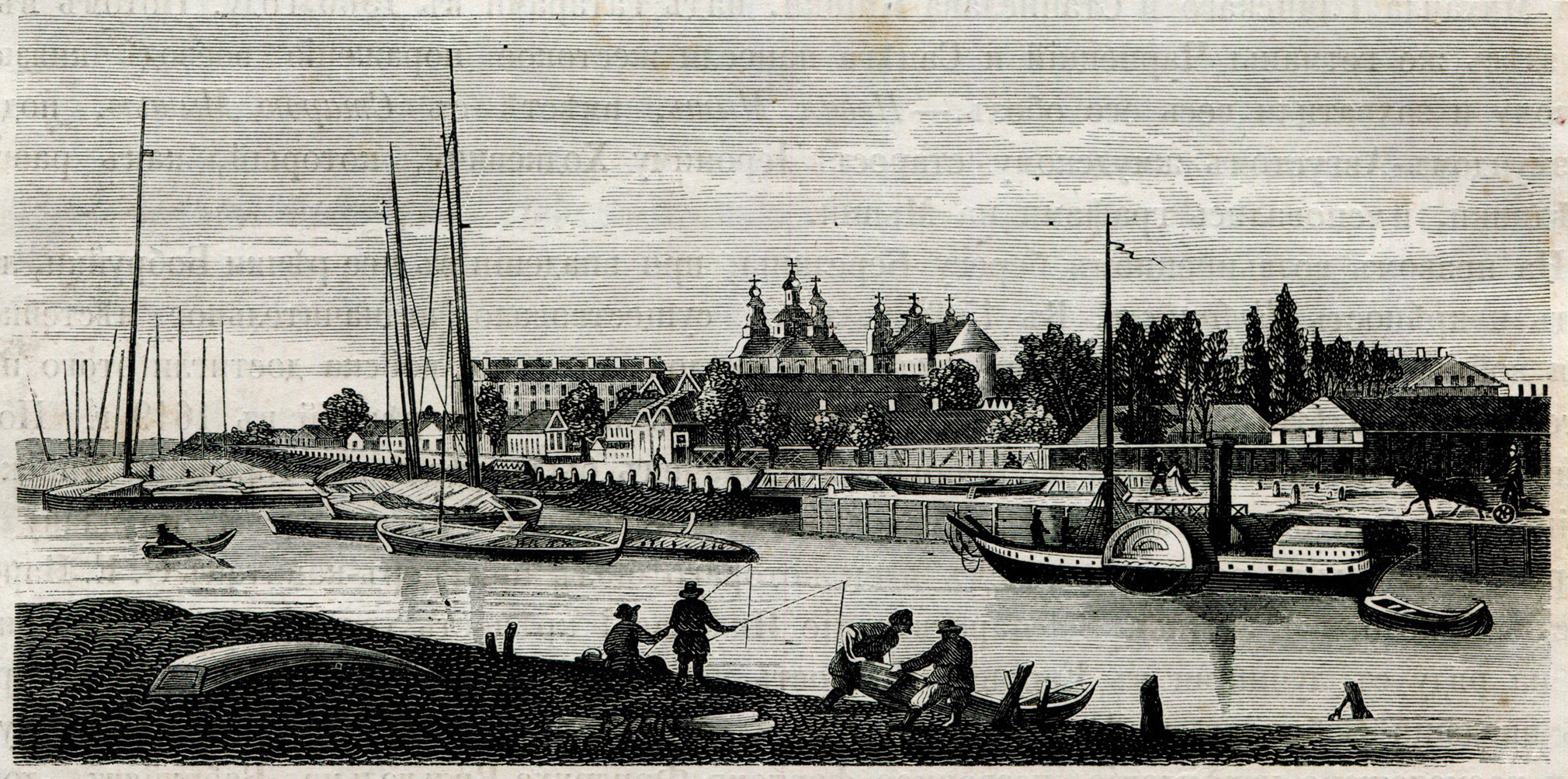
19th-century view of Pinsk

After the unsuccessful November Uprising by Polish rebels, several Catholic monasteries were suppressed, with the Dominican and Bernardine churches converted into Orthodox churches, the Carmelite monastery converted into a mill, and the Carmelite church dismantled. The Franciscan school was converted into a secular school in 1832, and later into a gymnasium in 1855.

In 1850, a candle and soap factory was established. In 1882, a railway line was brought from Żabinka and a match factory was opened. In 1885, a river shipyard was built in Leszcze. Pinsk was an important commercial hub in the region. Locally produced goods were exported to various locations, including Warsaw, Vilnius, Minsk, Kremenchuk, Austria, and Saint Petersburg. In 1907–1909, a provincial circle of the Polish Education Association in Minsk operated in the city, which organized lectures on Polish literature and vocabulary, which, according to a report by the Russian police, "increased Polish national consciousness". In 1909, during the local elections 22 Belarusians (Orthodox), 7 Poles (Catholics), 2 Jews and 1 representative of other nationalities were elected to the city council.

Like many other cities in Eastern Europe, Pinsk had a significant Jewish population before World War II. According to the 1897 Russian census, out of the total number of 28,400 inhabitants, there were 21,100 Jews (74% of the population), making Pinsk one of the most Jewish cities under tsarist rule.

=== First World War and Polish–Soviet War ===
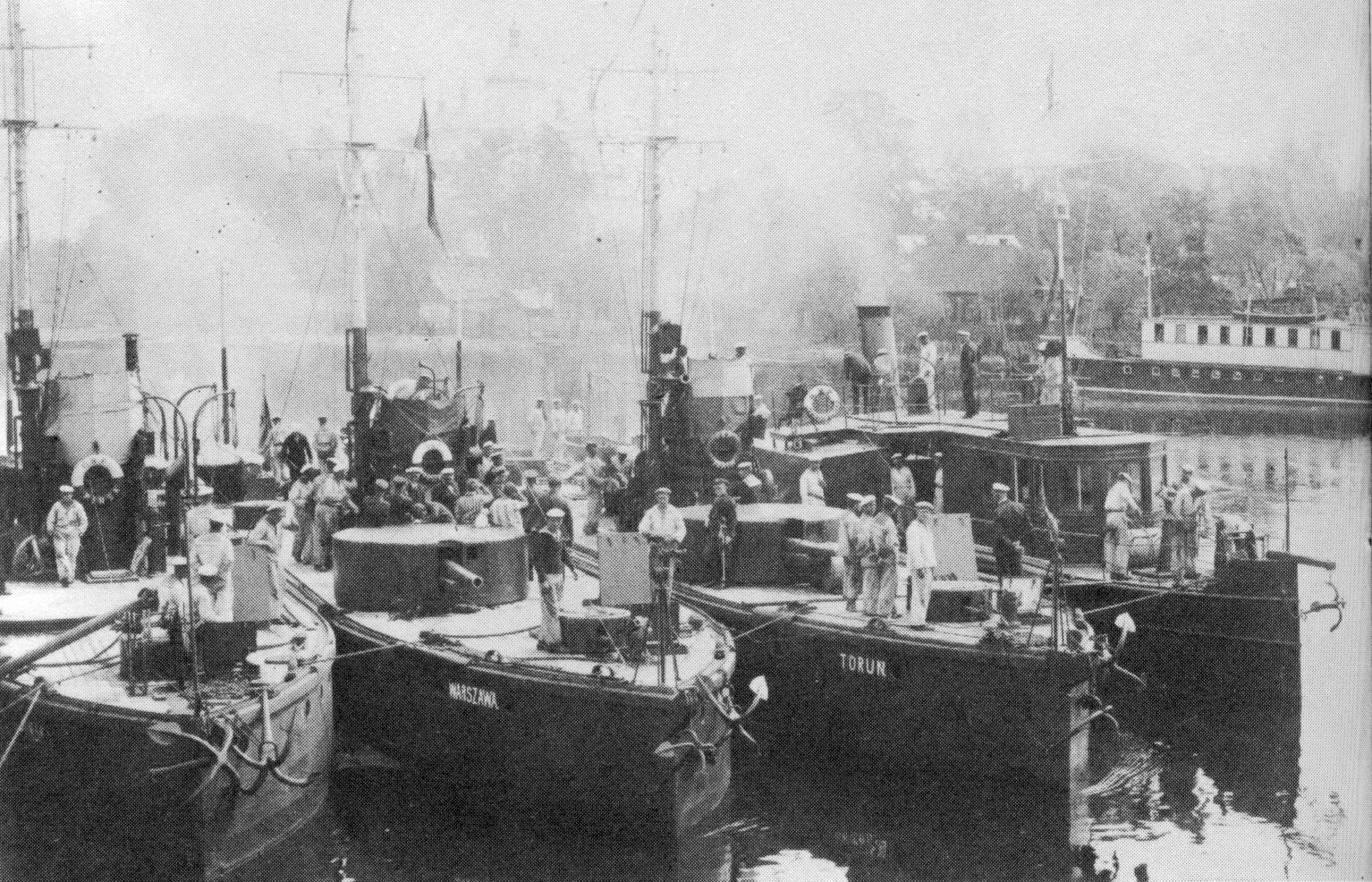
Polish river monitors in Pinsk (before 1926)

During World War I, in 1915, Russian authorities abandoned the city escaping from advancing German forces. Pinsk was occupied by the German Empire on 15 September 1915. After the German defeat, Pinsk became the subject of dispute between the Belarusian People's Republic and the Ukrainian People's Republic, both short-lived states. Pinsk was taken by the advancing Red Army on 25 January 1919, during the Soviet westward offensive of 1918–1919. It was retaken by Polish troops on 5 March 1919 during the Polish–Soviet War, but was retaken by the Red Army on 23 July 1920 and finally retaken by the Polish on 26 September 1920. Pińsk formally became part of the Second Polish Republic when the Polish–Soviet War ended when the Peace of Riga was signed in March 1921.

During the Polish–Soviet War, 35 Jewish civilians from Pinsk were executed by the Polish Army in April 1919 after being accused of collaborating with the Bolsheviks. The incident, known as the Pinsk massacre, created a diplomatic crisis noted at the Versailles Conference.

=== Interwar period ===
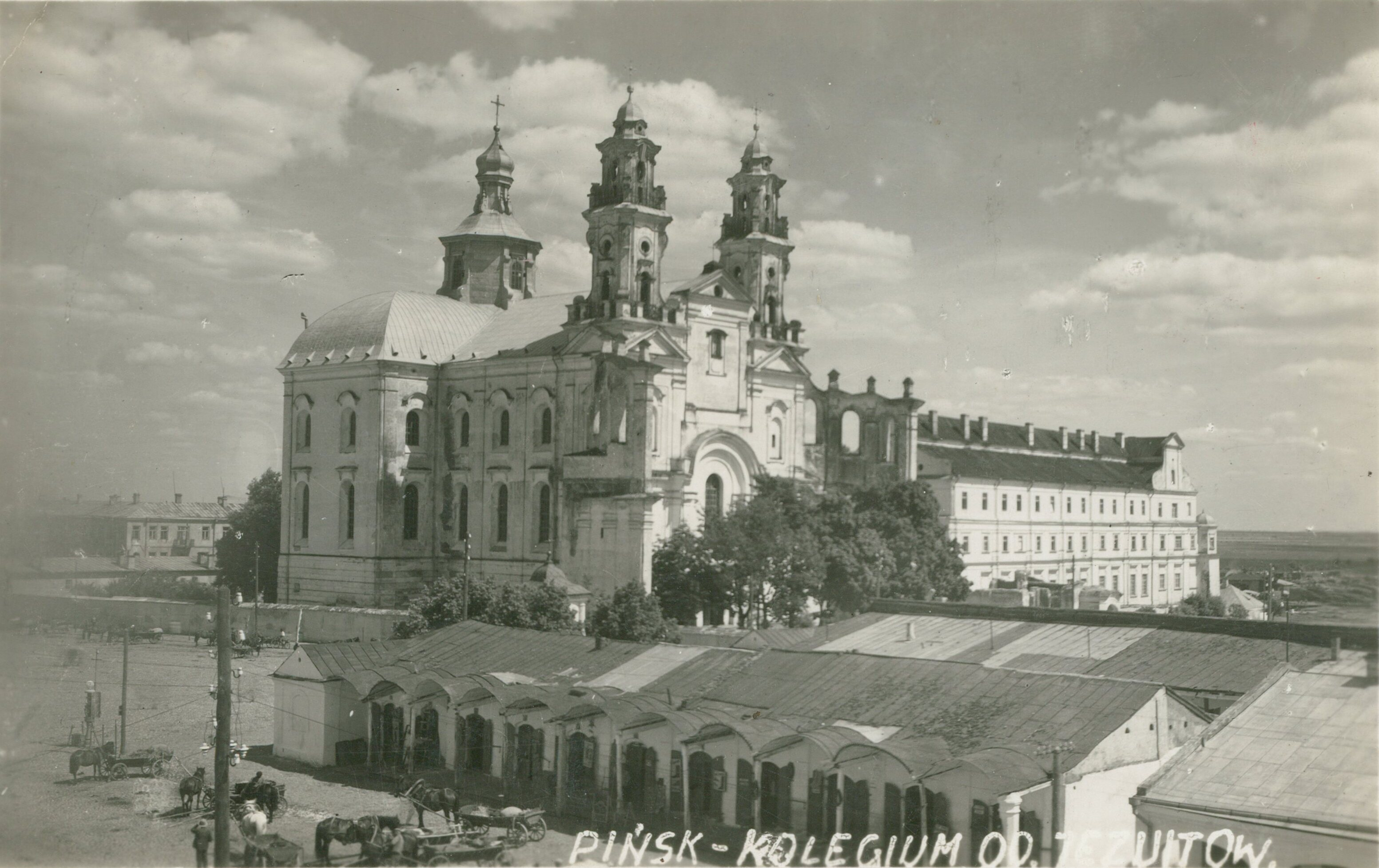
Old Market Square in the 1930s

Pińsk was the initial capital of the Polesie Voivodeship, but it was moved to Brześć-nad-Bugiem (now Brest, Belarus) after a citywide fire on 7 September 1921. According to the 1921 Polish census, the population of the city was 71.2% Jewish, 16.7% Polish, 9.8% Belarusian, and 2.1% Russian. The population of the city grew rapidly in interwar Poland, from 23,497 in 1921 to 33,500 in 1931. The city limits were expanded in 1929 and 1939. In 1925, the Catholic Diocese of Pinsk was established with the former Franciscan church designated its cathedral church. In 1926, Bishop Zygmunt Łoziński founded a theological seminary in Pinsk.

=== Second World War ===
During the invasion of Poland at the start of World War II, the Germans conducted an air raid on Pinsk on 9 September 1939. The city was eventually occupied by the Soviet Union on 20 September. It was annexed to the Byelorussian Soviet Socialist Republic and became the seat of Pinsk Oblast from 1940.

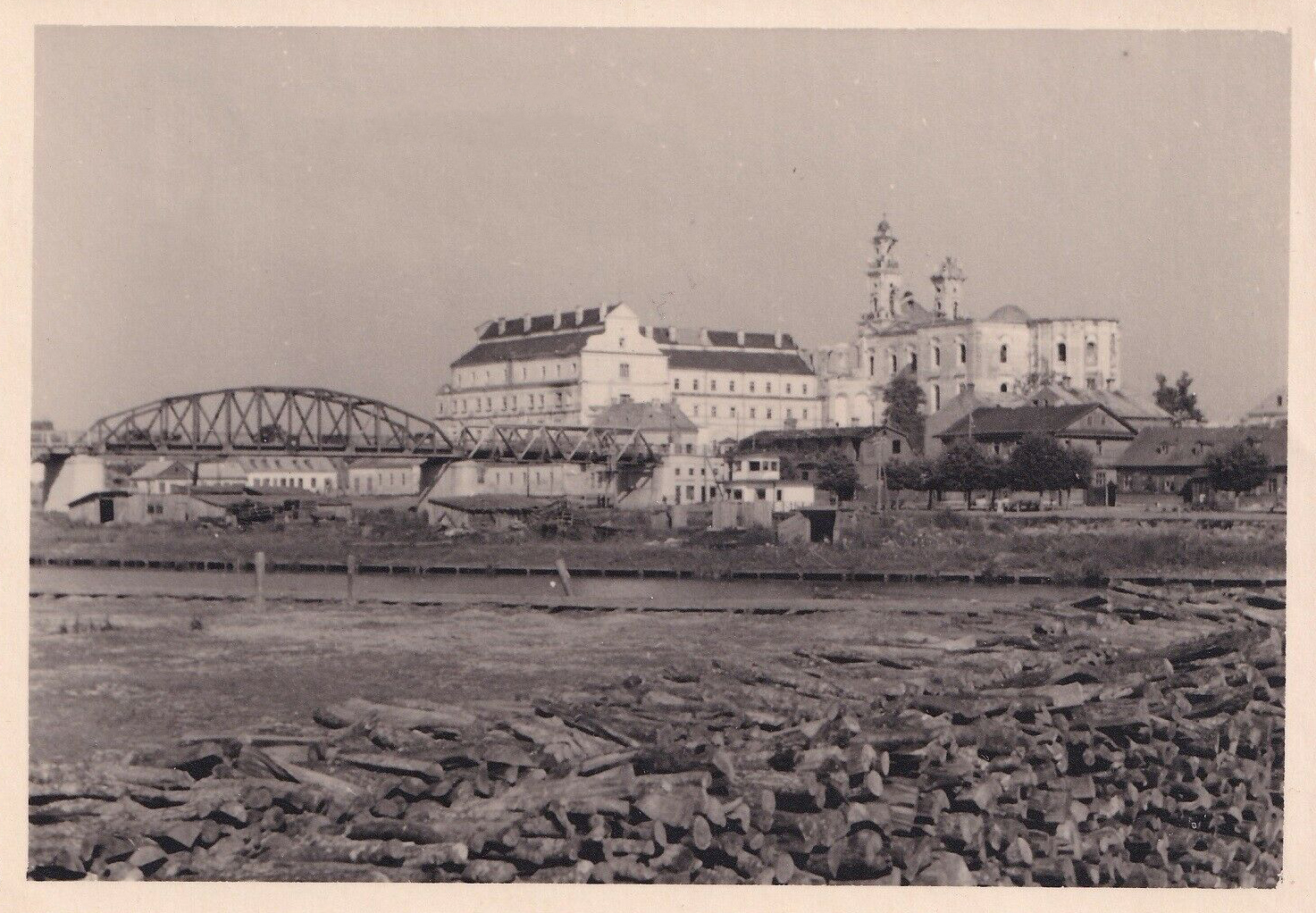
Panorama of Pinsk in 1942

After Operation Barbarossa, Germany occupied Pinsk from 4 July 1941 and became part of Reichskommissariat Ukraine. To maintain order, a respected citizen, Felicjan Śliwiński—a Pole and former high school principal—was appointed as the civilian mayor. Risking his own life, Śliwiński helped many residents and prisoners of war, and opposed the establishment of a ghetto for Jews. As a result, in November 1941, the Germans replaced him with a Ukrainian nationalist, and the terror against Jews, Poles, Belarusians and Russians intensified. The Germans organized roundups and deportations of Poles to forced labour in Germany. In 1942, the Pińsk Ghetto was established. Most Jews were killed in late October 1942 during the liquidation of the ghetto by the German Ordnungspolizei and the Byelorussian Auxiliary Police, with 10,000 being murdered in one day. In retaliation, acts of sabotage by the residents intensified.

The Germans also operated a prison, the Dulag 184 transit prisoner-of-war camp and forced labour camps in Pinsk. On 18 January 1943, the Wachlarz, a Polish resistance organization, carried out the 1943 Pinsk Prison raid, one of the most spectacular raids in the history of the Polish resistance movement, liberating over 40 prisoners, including Polish and Soviet partisans, as well as Alfred Paczkowski, leader of the regional unit of Wachlarz.

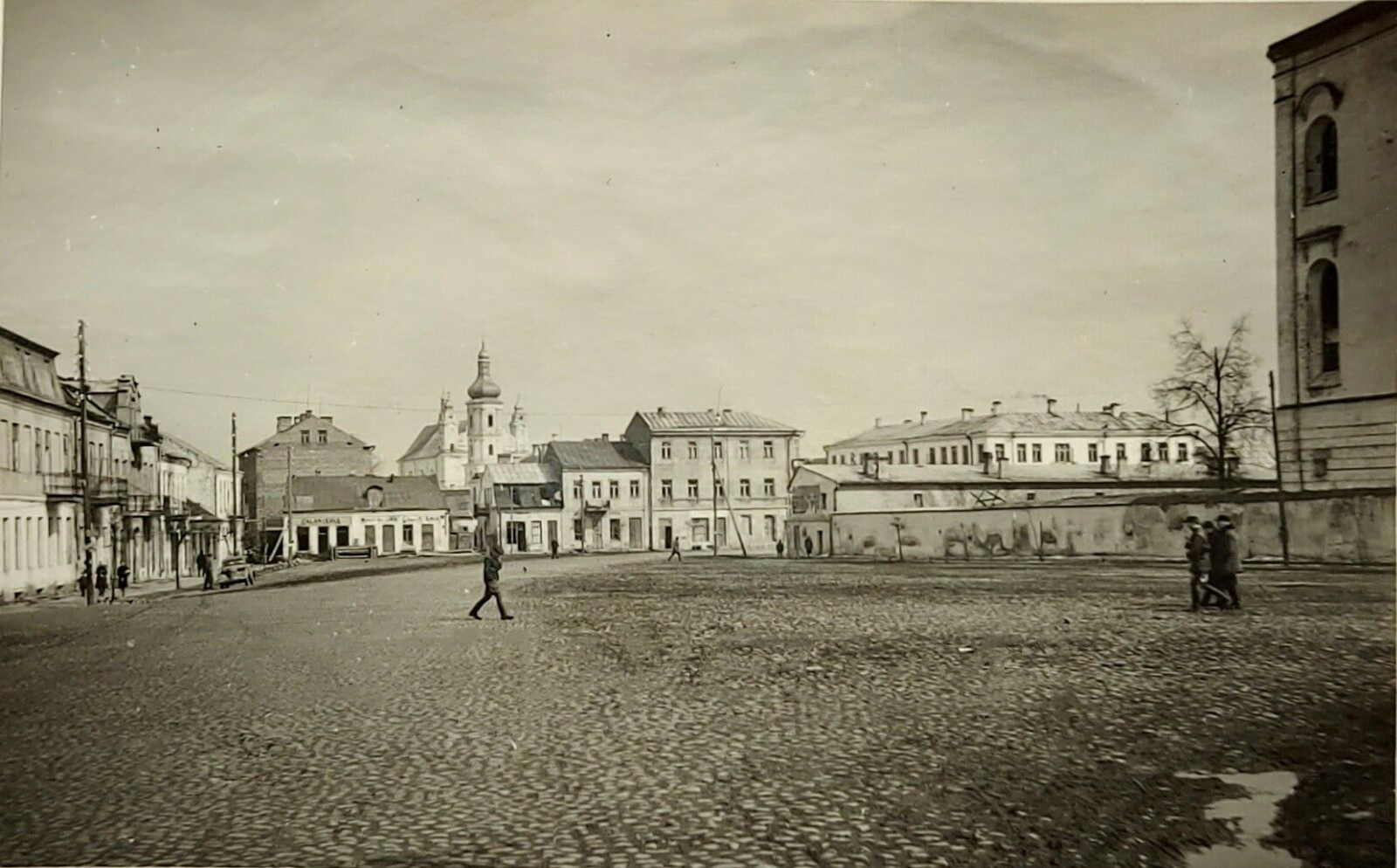
Pinsk in 1944

On 14 July 1944, Pinsk was recaptured by the Soviet Red Army, with just under 6,000 people remaining in the city. Many Orthodox clergy fled Pinsk ahead of the Soviet advance, including Alexander Inozemtsev, who died in Munich in 1948. In 1945, after the post-war border of Poland was finalized, Pinsk again became part of the Byelorussian Soviet Socialist Republic. Polish inhabitants were deported to post-war Poland.

=== Post-WWII and independence ===
In 1954, it became part of Brest Oblast.

In 1991, Pinsk became part of independent Belarus as a result of the dissolution of the Soviet Union.

== Landmarks ==
Three main sights of the town are lined along the river: the Assumption Cathedral of the Monastery of the Greyfriars (1712–1730), with a campanile from 1817, the Jesuit collegium (1635–1648); a large Mannerist complex, whose cathedral was demolished after World War II by communists; and the Butrymowicz Palace (1784–1790), built for Mateusz Butrymowicz, an important political and economical figure of Pinsk and Polesie. The Church of St. Charles Borromeo (1770—1782) and St. Barbara Cathedral of the Monastery of the St. Bernard Order (1786–1787) are placed near historic centre in the former Karolin suburb, which is now part of Pinsk. The foremost modern building is the black-domed Orthodox Cathedral of St. Theodore.

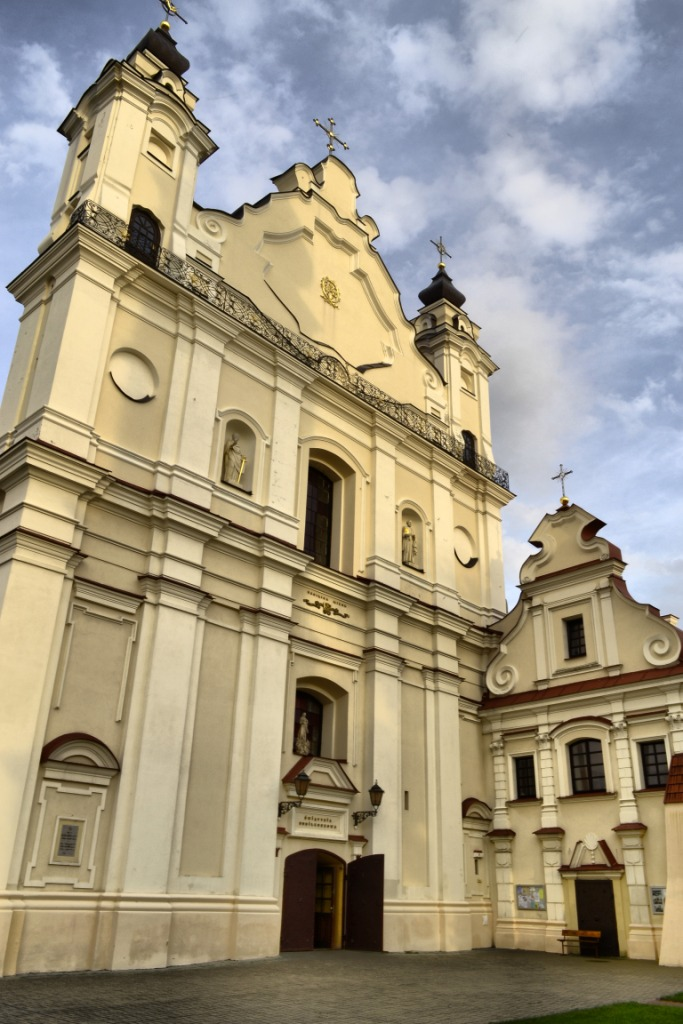
Cathedral of Name of the Blessed Virgin Mary

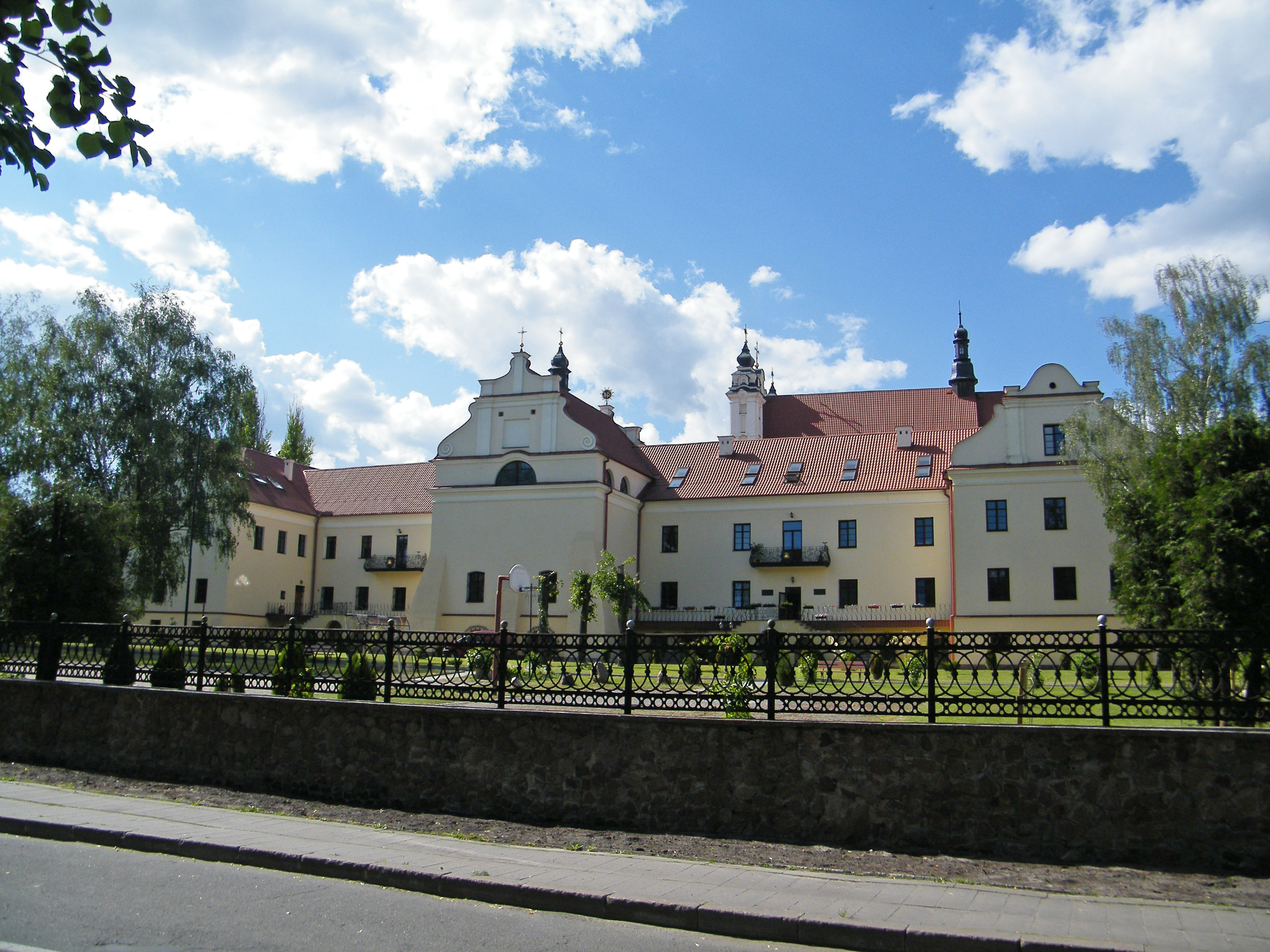
Monastery of the Greyfriars

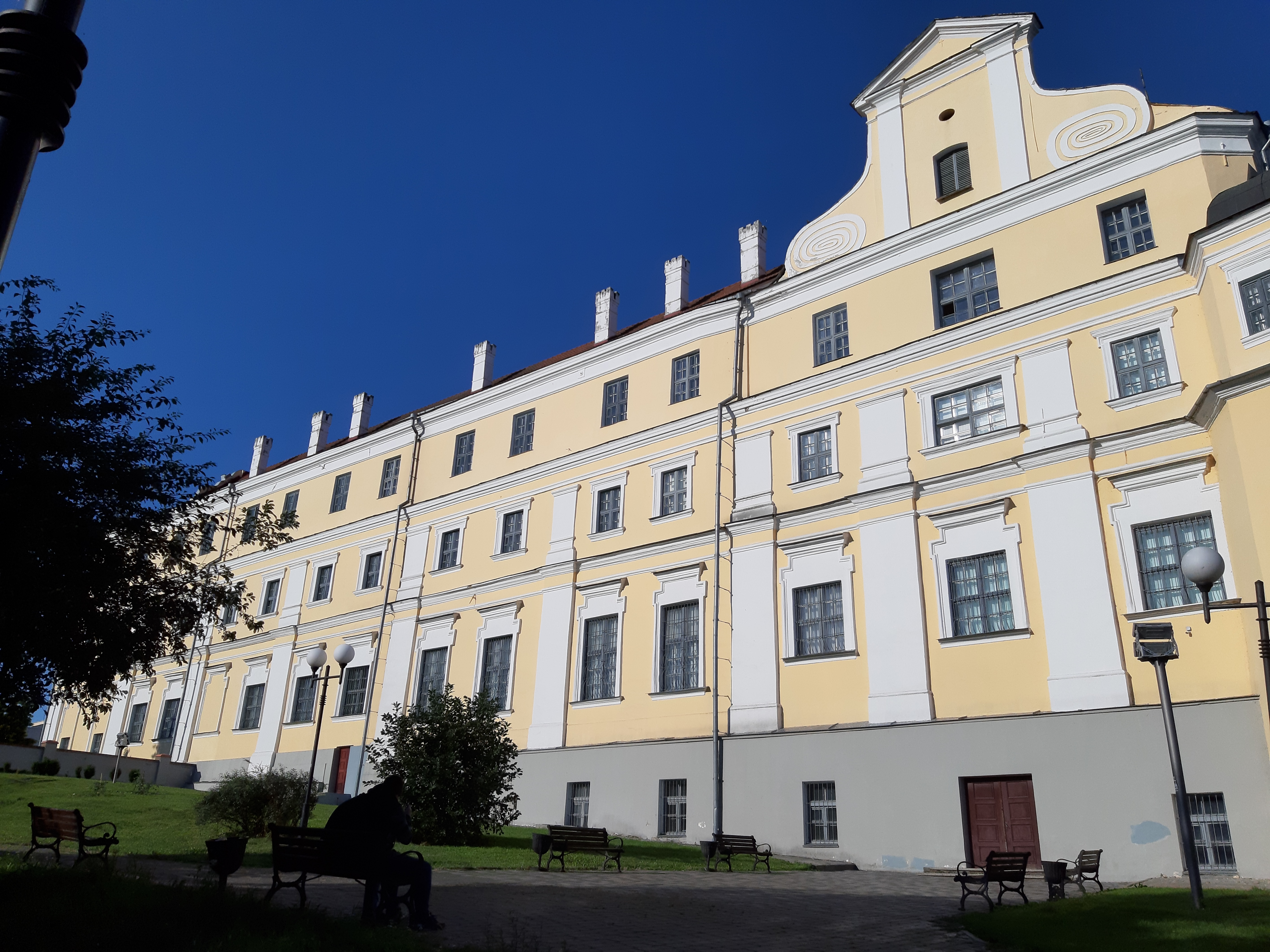
Jesuit collegium

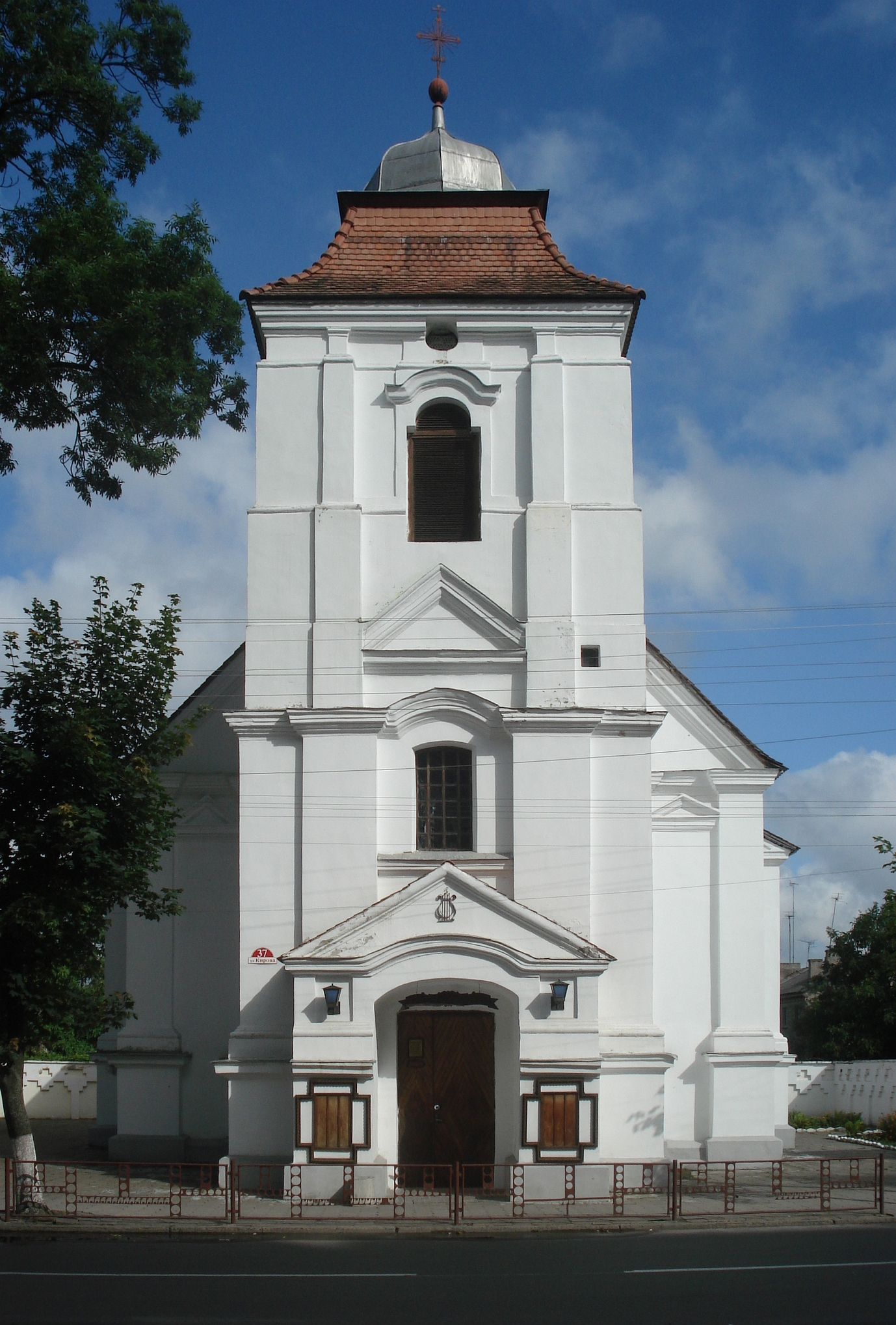
Church of St. Charles Borromeo

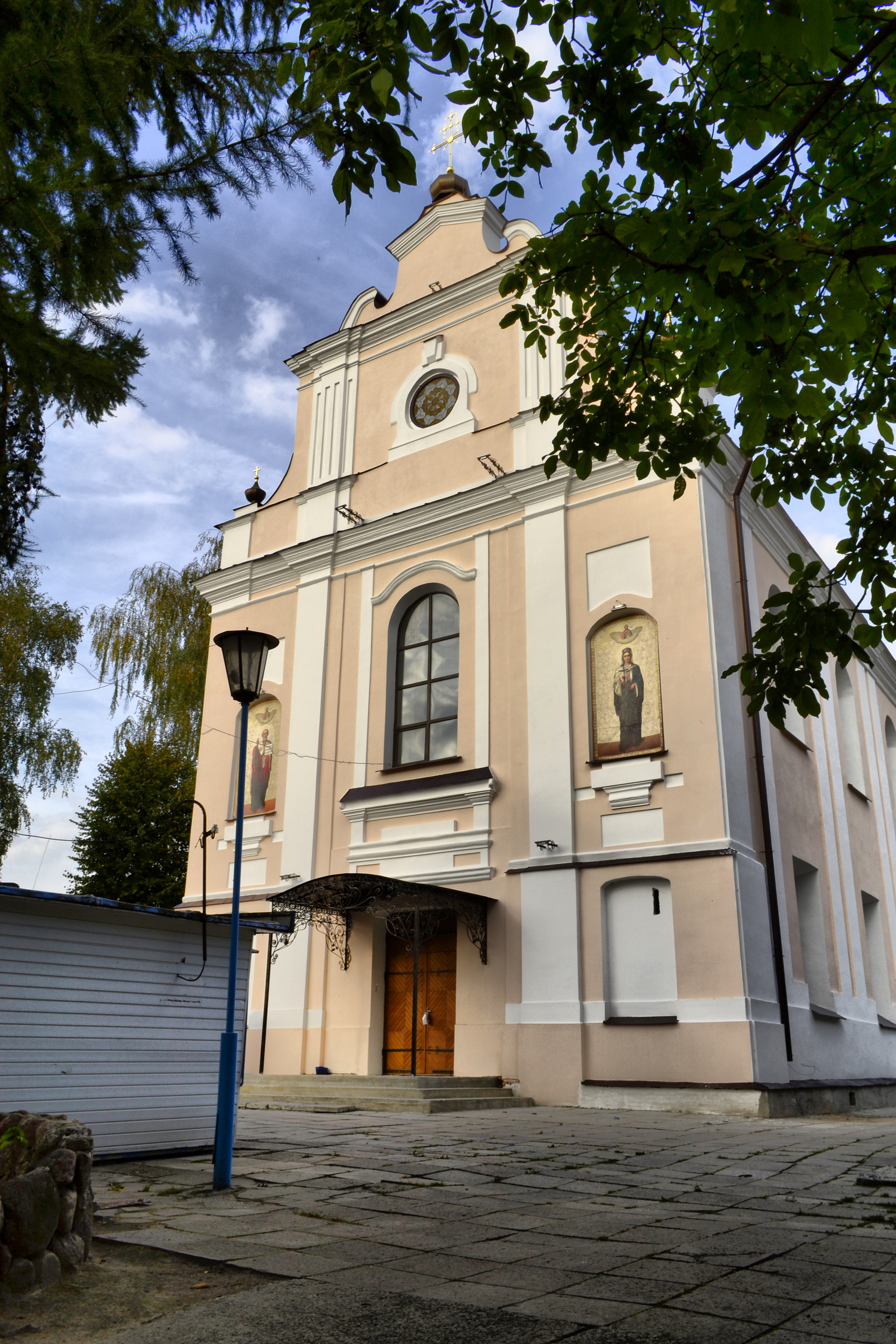
St. Barbara Cathedral

St. Theodore Cathedral

== Climate ==
Climate data for Pinsk (1991–2020, extremes 1875–present)
Month	Jan	Feb	Mar	Apr	May	Jun	Jul	Aug	Sep	Oct	Nov	Dec	Year
Record high °C (°F)	14.3 (57.7)	16.4 (61.5)	26.0 (78.8)	30.2 (86.4)	32.9 (91.2)	40.4 (104.7)	36.2 (97.2)	38.3 (100.9)	35.5 (95.9)	26.7 (80.1)	20.3 (68.5)	12.8 (55.0)	40.4 (104.7)
Mean daily maximum °C (°F)	−0.7 (30.7)	0.9 (33.6)	6.4 (43.5)	14.3 (57.7)	20.2 (68.4)	23.4 (74.1)	25.3 (77.5)	24.8 (76.6)	18.8 (65.8)	12.2 (54.0)	5.3 (41.5)	0.7 (33.3)	12.6 (54.7)
Daily mean °C (°F)	−3.0 (26.6)	−2.0 (28.4)	2.2 (36.0)	9.0 (48.2)	14.6 (58.3)	18.0 (64.4)	19.9 (67.8)	19.0 (66.2)	13.6 (56.5)	7.9 (46.2)	2.7 (36.9)	−1.6 (29.1)	8.4 (47.1)
Mean daily minimum °C (°F)	−5.3 (22.5)	−4.7 (23.5)	−1.4 (29.5)	4.1 (39.4)	9.1 (48.4)	12.7 (54.9)	14.6 (58.3)	13.6 (56.5)	9.1 (48.4)	4.4 (39.9)	0.4 (32.7)	−3.7 (25.3)	4.4 (39.9)
Record low °C (°F)	−34.7 (−30.5)	−29.9 (−21.8)	−25.7 (−14.3)	−9.0 (15.8)	−3.1 (26.4)	1.4 (34.5)	4.5 (40.1)	1.1 (34.0)	−4.5 (23.9)	−12.4 (9.7)	−23.3 (−9.9)	−28.0 (−18.4)	−34.7 (−30.5)
Average precipitation mm (inches)	39 (1.5)	32 (1.3)	36 (1.4)	35 (1.4)	59 (2.3)	74 (2.9)	92 (3.6)	57 (2.2)	52 (2.0)	46 (1.8)	45 (1.8)	44 (1.7)	611 (24.1)
Average extreme snow depth cm (inches)	5 (2.0)	6 (2.4)	3 (1.2)	0 (0)	0 (0)	0 (0)	0 (0)	0 (0)	0 (0)	0 (0)	1 (0.4)	4 (1.6)	6 (2.4)
Average rainy days	7	6	8	11	13	14	14	11	12	12	11	8	127
Average snowy days	14	14	9	2	0	0	0	0	0	1	6	13	59
Average relative humidity (%)	85	82	77	68	67	71	72	73	78	81	86	88	77
Mean monthly sunshine hours	38.4	62.4	141.0	199.0	264.8	281.2	280.8	272.6	180.5	120.5	42.7	31.8	1,915.7
Source 1: Pogoda.ru.netall-time extreme temperature
Source 2: NOAA

== Sports ==
The local association football is FC Volna Pinsk.

== Notable people ==
- Aaron of Pinsk (died 1841), rabbi
- Matheus Butrymowicz (1745–1814), Polish-Lithuanian statesman, reformer of Polesia
- Vladimir Chub (born 1948), governor of Rostov Oblast in Russia
- Vintsent Dunin-Martsinkyevich, (1808–1884), Belarusian writer, poet, dramatist and social activist, author of the play Pinskaya shlyakhta
- Baruch Epstein (1860–1941), bookkeeper, rabbi and prolific Jewish scholar, best known for his Torah Temimah commentary on the Torah
- William Moses Feldman (1880–1939), child physiologist, born in Pinsk
- Semyon Furman (1920–1978), Chess grandmaster and trainer of World Champion Anatoly Karpov
- Jonah Gogol (died 1602), Orthodox and later an Uniate bishop
- Olga Govortsova, (born 1988) Belarusian tennis player
- Haim Gvati (1901–1990), Israeli Minister of Agriculture
- Chaim Kanievsky (1928–2022), rabbi

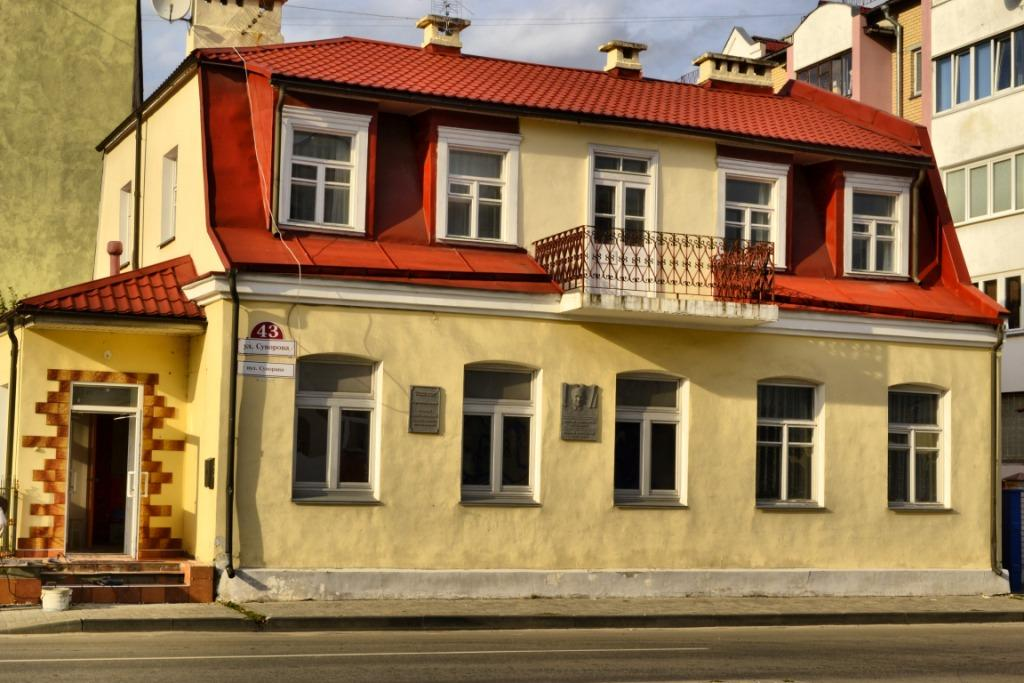
Childhood home of Ryszard Kapuściński

- Ryszard Kapuściński (1932–2007), Polish writer and reporter
- Danila Klimovich (born 2003), NHL prospect currently under contract with the Vancouver Canucks, and currently on the active roster for the AHL Abbotsford Canucks
- Moshe Kol (1911–1989), Israeli politician and one of the signatories of the Israeli declaration of independence
- Igor Kolb (born 1977), principal dancer of Mariinsky Ballet
- Andrzej Kondratiuk (1936–2016), Polish film director, screenwriter, actor, and cinematographer
- Simon Kuznets (1901–1985), 1971 Nobel laureate in economics
- Golda Meir (1898–1978), fourth prime minister of Israel, born in Kiev, lived two years of her childhood in Pinsk
- Shabsay Moshkovsky (1895–1982), noted physician, research scientist and malariologist
- Adam Naruszewicz (1733–1796), Polish-Lithuanian poet, historian, bishop
- Narymunt (1277–1348), Prince of Pinsk
- Theodore Odrach (1912–1964), Ukrainian and Polesian writer of novels, short stories and memoirs
- Napoleon Orda (1807–1883), Polish-Lithuanian musician, pianist, composer and artist
- Sławomir Rawicz (1915–2004), Polish Army lieutenant, claimed to have walked from Siberia to India during World War II
- Bona Sforza (1494–1557), Queen consort of Poland and Grand Duchess consort of Lithuania, Princess of Pinsk
- Yauhen Shatokhin (1947–2012), Belarusian painter and political activist
- Izya Shlosberg (born 1950), Jewish American artist, born in Pinsk and lived in Pinsk for 44 years
- Sir Isaac Shoenberg (1880–1963), electrical engineer born in Pinsk, principal inventor of the first high-definition television system, as used by the BBC
- Helena Skirmunt (1827–1874), Polesian painter and sculptor
- Raman Skirmunt (1868–1939), Belarusian and Polesian statesman, aristocrat and landlord
- Kazimierz Świątek (1914–2011), Cardinal of the Roman Catholic Church, Metropolitan Archbishop of Minsk-Mohilev and Apostolic Administrator of Pinsk
- Chaim Weizmann (1874–1952), first president of Israel, born in Motal, near Pinsk and educated in Pinsk
- Tatiana Woollaston (born 1986), professional snooker referee, born in Pinsk
- Leo Zeitlin (1884–1930), composer, born in Pinsk before studying in Odessa and later moving to the U.S.A.
- Ivan Zholtovsky (1867–1959), Soviet architect and educator
