= Adam Remigiusz Grocholski =

Polish Army officer (1888–1965)

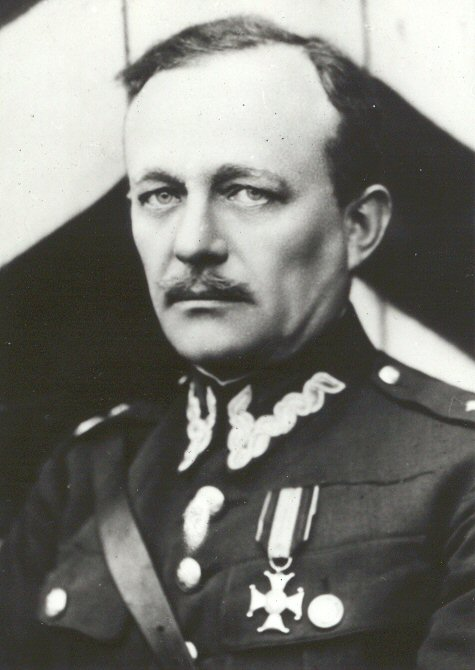
- Born: 3 September 1888; Strzyżawka
- Died: 17 March 1965 (aged 76); Cannes, France
- Burial place: Laski near Warsaw, Poland
- Education: Higher War School
- Military career
- Allegiance: Poland
- Service years: 1915-1944
- Rank: Lieutenant Colonel
- Nicknames: "Brochwicz", "Doktor", "Inżynier", "Miś", "Waligóra"
- Conflicts: Polish–Soviet War, Warsaw Uprising
- Awards: Virtuti Militari (Gold and Silver Cross), Cross of Independence with Swords (1934), Cross of Valour (five times)

Adam Remigiusz Grocholski war names "Brochwicz", "Doktor", "Inżynier", "Miś", "Waligóra", and pseudonym Żukowski (3 September 1888 – 17 March 1965) was a Lieutenant Colonel (Podpułkownik) of the Polish Armed Forces. He retired from active service in 1934.

== Biography ==
=== Early years ===
Adam Remigiusz Grocholski was born on 3 September 1888 in Strzyżawka, the Ukrainian district of Winnica (Vinnytsia), to Tadeusz Grocholski, a landowner, and Zofia Grocholska, maiden name Zamoyska. He completed his secondary education in Odessa and went on to read History and Law at Saint Petersburg University. After completing his studies, he was treated for tuberculosis in Zakopane and Davos

=== World War I ===
In July 1915, Adam Remigiusz, as a plenipotentiary of the Red Cross, was co-opted as an Officer of Special Missions under the auspices of the Governor of the Caucasus. In March 1917, he organised and directed the Association of the Polish Military in Russia (Związek Wojskowych Polaków w Rosji) in Batumi – Tbilisi. In December 1917, he was selected as Section Leader of the Third Polish Corps in the East (III Korpus Polski na Wschodzie).

=== Polish-Soviet War ===
Adam Remigiusz Grocholski was momentarily arrested in Warsaw, in January 1919, for his fortuitous participation in the attempted coup perpetrated by General Marian Januszajtis-Żegota. In March that same year, he served in the Regular Polish Army as Commander of a Heavy Machine-Gun Squadron within the 12th Cavalry Regiment (12 Pułk Ułanów). Later, in October, he completed a course at the Higher War School in Warsaw, working there briefly as a translator and, in December, was appointed aide-de-camp in the 15th Infantry Brigade. In July 1920, he was co-opted as Chief of Staff in the 6th Army, taking an active part in the Polish–Soviet War. In September 1920, he was appointed Chief of Staff within General Władysław Jędrzejewski's Unit.

=== Interbellum years ===
In March 1921, with the outbreak of the Third Silesian Uprising, Adam Remigiusz Grocholski was selected to be Head of the Third Operational Section - within the HQ of Polish Uprising Forces (Dowództwo Obrony Plebiscytu) - whose aim was to ascertain Polish rights in the Upper Silesian Plebiscite. He issued, inter alia, Operational Directive # 1 to commence an uprising against German paramilitary units. He adopted at the time the nom de guerre of "Brochwicz". From November 1921, he served as Chief Inspector of the Eastern Border in the Wołyń Voivodeship and, from 1923, worked temporarily for the Polish Military Science Institute (Wojskowy Instytut Naukowo-Wydawniczy) as well as for the Higher Military Academy (Wyzsza Szkola Wojenna) as a translator. Adam Remigiusz then went on to follow courses at the Central Riding School (Centralna Szkoła Jazdy) in Grudziądz as well as at the Higher Military Academy in Warsaw. In October 1925, he was appointed Officer of the Third Bureau within the Polish War Council (Ścisła Rada Wojenna) and, from August 1926, became aide-de-camp of Józef Piłsudski's Minister of War. In 1932, he was promoted to Squadron Leader and, later, to Deputy Commander of the First Cavalry Rifle Regiment (1. Pułk Strzelców Konnych). On 31 August 1934, Adam Remigiusz Grocholski retired from active military service. From then on, he devoted his time to writing and painting.

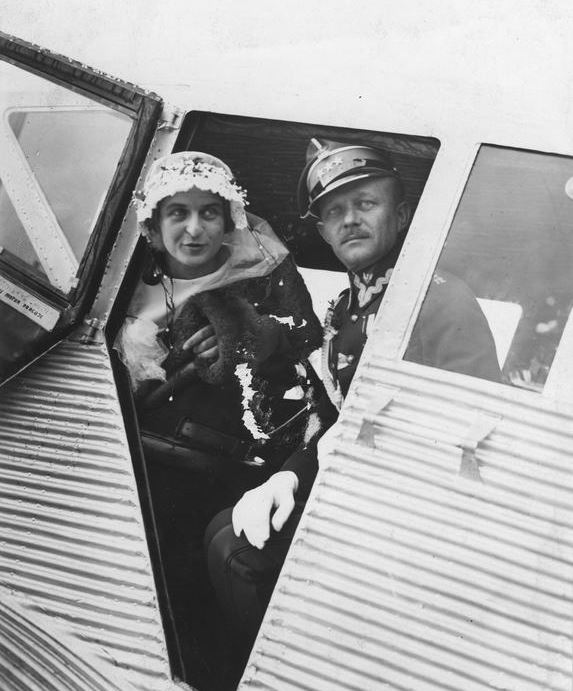
Adam Remigiusz Grocholski with his wife Barbara Czetwertyńska.

On 11 October 1925, he married Barbara Światopełk Czetwertyńska with whom he had 10 children: Tadeusz Mikołaj (1926), Barbara (1927), Remigian (1928), Michał (1929), Anna (1931), Ignacy (1933), Franciszek (1934), Włodzimierz (1936), Piotr (1938) and Elżbieta (1940).

Captain (Rotmistrz) Grocholski, whom I knew for a short while, was a man full of generosity and an extraordinary demeanour. I know of no one else who could enter or leave a room with so great a noble attitude. One could assume this is an easy thing to do but it is not. For instance, leaving a room and closing the door without looking back and fiddling clumsily with the knob. Captain Grocholski painted and wrote poems. He was hence never a bore and I always liked him (...) One could argue that my comments concerning Captain Grocholski are trivial ones. This is not so as his demeanour cannot be dismissed as mere trivia. Here again, as is the case with the clothes we wear, a person's qualities and short-comings can be perceived through his or her gestures, thus perceiving part of his or her soul. Taking such matters for granted - by being detached or even sarcastic - can sometimes give a completely false impression of who we really are.

Adam Remigiusz Grocholski is a founding Member of the Polish Military Intelligence Society (Towarzystwo Wiedzy Wojskowej) and the Polish Aero Club. He is the author of numerous articles in the military press.

=== World War II ===
During the September Campaign, Adam Remigiusz Grocholski created the "Brochwicz" conspiratorial section. Its aim was to carry out covert operations for the benefit of the Independent Polesie Operational Group (Samodzielna Grupa Operacyjna "Polesie") under the command of General Franciszek Kleeberg. Adam Remigiusz was later assigned as Commander of "Brochwicz" in the Lublin area using at the time the aliases of "Brochwicz" and "Miś". In January 1940, the Brochwicz organisation merged with the Union of Armed Struggle (Związek Walki Zbrojnej or ZWZ). ZWZ was divided into two parts: (i) areas under German occupation commanded by Colonel Stefan Rowecki from Warsaw, and (ii) areas under Soviet occupation commanded by General Michał Tokarzewski-Karaszewicz from Lwow (Leopolis).

In the spring of 1940, Adam Remigiusz Grocholski became a member of the Editorial Committee of the "Soldier's Bulletin" (Biuletyn Żołnierski), an underground magazine first published in August 1940 by the Secret Polish Army (Tajna Armia Polska), renamed the "Armed Confederation" (Konfederacja Zbrojna) and which later joined forces with the Home Army (Armia Krajowa). In the spring of 1941, in the face of a probable conflict between the Third Reich and the Union of Soviet Socialist Republics, Adam Remigiusz submitted to ZWZ Headquarters the project of creating a subversive organisation that would execute covert operations at the rearguard of the German-Soviet front. In September 1941, he was appointed aide-de-camp of Lieutenant Colonel Jan Włodarkiewicz, Commander in Chief of "Wachlarz". Adam Remigiusz was at the time promoted to the rank of Major using several aliases: "Doktor", "Inżynier" and "Waligóra". On 11 November 1942, he was promoted to the rank of lieutenant colonel (Directive # L21/BP). Following Lieutenant Colonel Jan Włodarkiewicz's death, he served, from April/May 1942 to March 1943, as the Commander in Chief of "Wachlarz" . He resided then in Warsaw at 103 ulica Puławska under the pseudonym "Żukowski". Later, during the Warsaw Uprising and as from 1 September 1944, he was put in charge by the Home Army of Area V of the Mokotów District in Warsaw. He adopted the nom de guerre of "Waligóra" (henceforth, all underground forces from this area formed the "Waligóra Regiment"). Severely wounded on 25 September, he was evacuated two days later from the urban battlefield by couriers, mingling amidst the civilian population who were fleeing from the Mokotów District. On 29 September 1944, Adam Remigiusz was promoted to the rank of colonel of the Home Army.

=== People's Republic of Poland ===
After World War II, Adam Remigiusz Grocholski lived in Szklarska Poręba and, from 1954 onwards, in Warsaw. He died on 17 March 1965 in Cannes, France, and was buried in the Military Cemetery in Laski, near Warsaw.

== Orders and decorations ==
- Virtuti Militari Golden Cross
- Virtuti Militari Silver Cross
- Cross of Independence with Swords (1934)
- Cross of Valour (five times)

== Sources ==
- Biography of Adam Remigiusz Grocholski by grandson Henryk Grocholski (in Polish)
