= Halina =

First name

Halina is a given name. Notable people with the name include:

- Halina Aszkiełowicz (1947–2018), Polish former volleyball player and 1968 Olympic medallist
- Halina Balon (born 1948), Polish fencer
- Halina Biegun (born 1955), Polish luger who competed during the late 1970s
- Halina Birenbaum (born 1929), Holocaust survivor, writer, poet and translator
- Halina Buyno-Łoza (1907–1991), Polish theatre actress and dancer
- Halina Chrostowska (1929–1990), Polish visual artist
- Halina Czerny-Stefańska (1922–2001), Polish pianist
- Halina Górecka (born 1938), former Polish and German sprinter and Olympic gold and bronze medal winner
- Halina Górska (1898–1942), Polish writer and a communist activist
- Halina Harelava (born 1951), Belarusian contemporary composer
- Halina Kanasz (born 1953), Polish luger who competed during the 1970s
- Halina Karnatsevich (born 1969), Belarusian long-distance runner
- Halina Konopacka (1900–1989), famous athlete, first Polish Olympic Champion (1928, Amsterdam)
- Halina Krahelska (1892–1945), Polish activist, publicist and writer
- Halina Krzyżanowska (1860–1937), internationally renowned Polish-French pianist and composer
- Halina Kwiatkowska (1921–2020), Polish actress
- Halina Jaroszewiczowa (1892–1940), Polish politician
- Halina Lacheta, Polish luger who competed in the late 1950s
- Halina Łukomska (1929–2016), Polish soprano
- Halina Machulska (born 1929), Polish theater, film and television actress
- Halina Mierzejewska (1922–2003), professor of linguistics at the University of Warsaw, in the Institute of Polish Language
- Halina Mlynkova (born 1977), Czech-born Polish singer, leader of a popular Polish folk-rock group Brathanki
- Halina Molka (born 1953), Polish politician
- Halina Murias (born 1955), Polish politician
- Halina Olendzka (born 1945), Polish politician
- Halina Poświatowska (1935–1967), Polish poet and writer, an important figure in modern Polish literature
- Halina Regulska (1899–1994) Polish racing driver, socialite, a member of the underground Polish resistance movement in World War II who took part in the Warsaw Uprising, author
- Halina Reijn (born 1975), Dutch actress and writer
- Halina Rozpondek (born 1950), Polish politician
- Halina Seyda (1906–1944), Polish banker and underground activist
- Halina Szwarc de domo Kłąb (1923–2002), member of the Polish resistance during the Second World War
- Halina Szymańska (1906–1989), wife of Colonel Antoni Szymański, the last prewar Polish military attaché in Berlin
- Halina Tam (born 1972), model, singer and television actress
- Halina Weinstein (1902–1942), Polish Esperantist

== See also ==
- Allamaye Halina (born 1967), Prime Minister of Chad
- William Halina (fl. 1935–1945), Canadian political candidate
- Helena (given name)
- Galina
