= Galina =

Galina (Russian: Галина; from Greek: γαλήνη, lit. 'serenity, calm') is a Russian feminine given name. The name Gala is a contracted form and is also of Russian origin. It is generally transliterated as Halyna in Ukrainian and as Halina in Belarusian. The latter form is also frequently found in Poland.

Two Christian female martyrs of this name are recognized by the Orthodox church: the first died in 252 (feast day March 10 old style), the other one, the more famous Galina of Corinth, in 290 (feast day April 16 old style).

== Forms ==
Diminutives include:

- Common: Galya, Galka, Gala, Galochka, Galusha, Galechka, Galenka, Galinka
- Less common: Galinochka (Галиночка), Galinushka (Галинушка), Galinushenka (Галинушенька), Галиха, Галиша, Галишка, Галишна, Галок.

== People ==
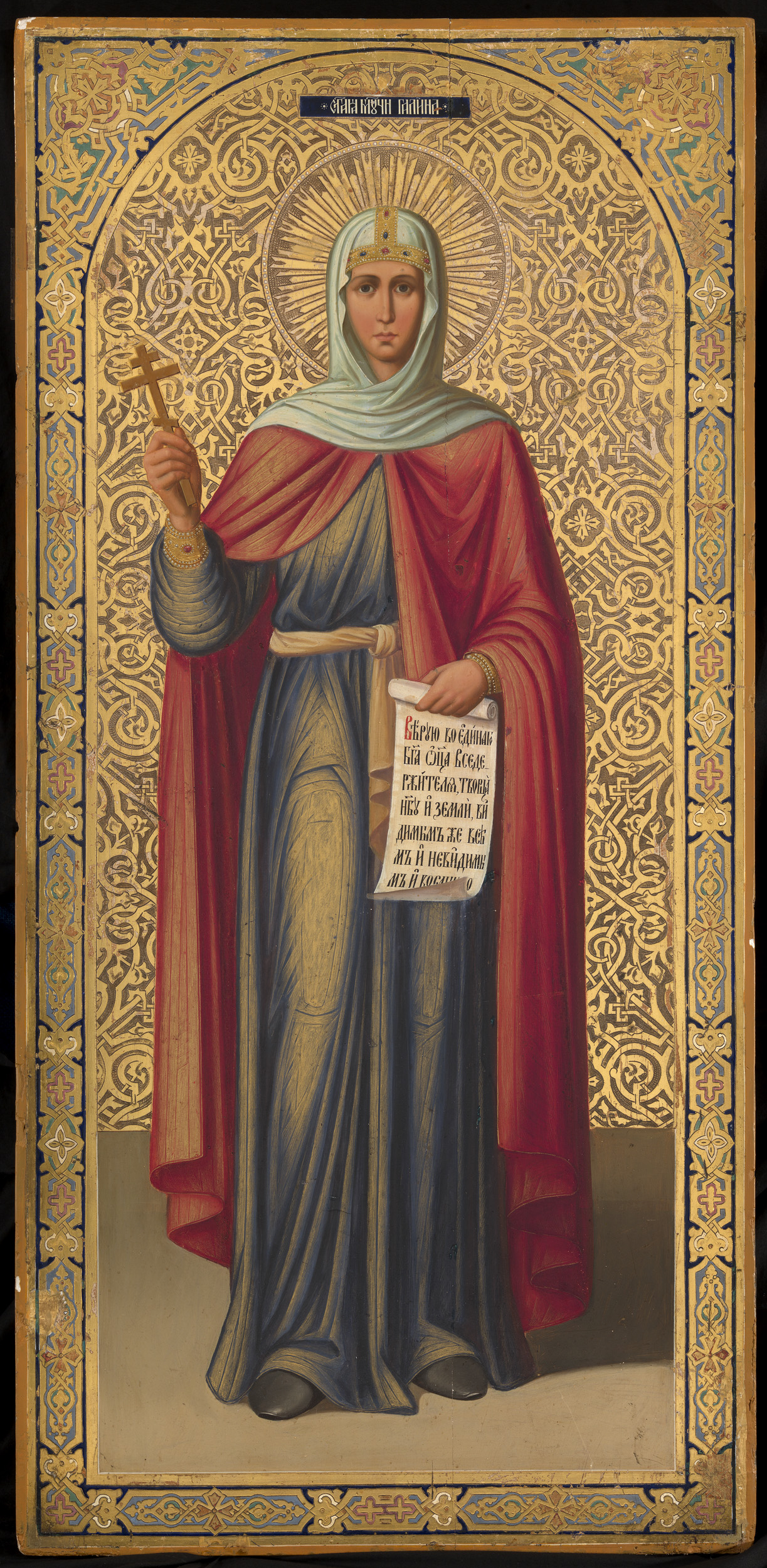
Galina of Corinth (Russian icon)

- Galina Antyufeyeva, Transnistrian politician and the wife of Vladimir Antyufeyev.
- Galina Begim (born 2002), Russian gymnast
- Galina Beloglazova (born 1967), Russian rhythmic gymnast
- Galina Bogdanova (1925–2013), Russian grinder and production leader
- Galina Borzenkova (born 1964), Russian handball player
- Galina Brezhneva (1929–1998), daughter of the Soviet leader Leonid Brezhnev
- Galina Bogomolova (born 1977), Russian long-distance runner
- Galina Bukharina (born 1945), Soviet athlete
- Galina Burdina (1919–2006), Soviet fighter pilot
- Galina Bystrova (1934–1999), Soviet athlete
- Galina Chistyakova (born 1962), Soviet long jumper
- Galina Danilchenko (born 1964), Ukrainian accountant and politician
- Galina Dodon (born 1977), Moldovan First Lady
- Galina Dyuragina, Russian author and child psychologist
- Galina Dzhugashvili (1938–2007), Russian translator of French
- Galina Efremenko (born 1980), Ukrainian figure skater
- Galina Eguiazarova, Russian pianist
- Galina Gorokhova (born 1938), Soviet and Russian fencer
- Galina Grzhibovskaya (born 1951), Soviet figure skater
- Galina Kakovkina (born 1957), Russian artist
- Galina Kreft (1950–2005), Soviet sprint canoer
- Galina Korchuganova (1935–2004), Soviet/Russian test pilot and aerobatics champion
- Galina Kulakova (born 1942), Soviet cross country skier
- Galina Kofman, Russian-born, American computer scientist
- Galina Kopernak (1902–1985), Russian theater actress
- Galina Koukleva (born 1972), Russian biathlete
- Galina Likhachova (born 1977), Russian speed skater
- Galina Lukashenko (born 1955), First Lady of Belarus
- Galina Malchugina (born 1962), Russian sprinter
- Galina Mezentseva (born 1952), Russian ballerina
- Galina Miklínová (born 1970), Czech illustrator and director
- Galina Minaicheva (1929–2025), Soviet artistic gymnast
- Galina Mishenina (1950–2026), Russian rower
- Galina Mitrokhina (rowing) (born 1940), Russian rower
- Galina Mitrokhina (athletics) (born 1944), Russian track and field athlete
- Galina Murašova (born 1955), Lithuanian discus thrower
- Galina Onopriyenko (born 1963), Russian handball player
- Galina Pedan (born 1983), Kyrgyzstani athlete
- Galina Penkova (born 1958), Bulgarian sprinter
- Galina Pilyushenko (born 1945), Soviet cross country skier
- Galina Polskikh (born 1939), Soviet film actress
- Galina Poryvayeva (born 1980), Russian sprint canoeist
- Galina Prozumenshchikova (1948–2015), Soviet swimmer
- Galina Rytova (born 1975), Russian-Kazakhstani water polo player
- Galina Samsova (1937–2021), Russian ballerina
- Galina Savelyeva (1928–2022), Russian gynaecologist
- Galina Savenko (1966–2012), Soviet sprint canoeist
- Galina Savinkova (born 1953), track and field athlete
- Galina Serdyukovskaya (1914–2000), Russian hygienist, academic and politician
- Galina Sergeyeva (1914–2000), Russian actress
- Galina Shamrai (1931–2022), Soviet gymnast
- Galina Shostakovich (born 1936), Russian pianist and biologist
- Galina Shubina (1902–1980), Russian poster and graphics artist
- Galina Skakun (1943–2022), Belarusian cattle breeder and milkmaid
- Galina Stancheva (born 1952), Bulgarian volleyball player
- Galina Starovoytova (1946–1998), Russian politician and ethnographer
- Galina Stepanskaya (born 1949), speed skater
- Galina Timchenko (born 1962), Russian journalist
- Galina Ivanovna Tsukanova (1942–2014), Soviet and Russian scientist and engineer
- Galina Tyurina (1938–1970), Soviet mathematician
- Galina Ulanova (1910–1998), Russian ballerina
- Galina Varlamova (1951–2019), Evenk writer
- Galina Vecherkovskaya (born 1926), Russian rower
- Galina Vinogradova (born 1979), Russian orienteering competitor
- Galina Vishnevskaya (1926–2012), Russian opera singer
- Galina Voskoboeva (born 1984), Russian-Kazakhstani tennis player
- Galina Yermolayeva (rower) (born 1948), Russian rower
- Galina Yershova, Russian academic historian
- Galina Zhikareva, Soviet sprint canoeist
- Galina Zhitnyuk (1925–2020), Soviet-Moldovan politician
- Galina Zmievskaya (born 1946), Ukrainian figure skating coach
- Galina Zybina (1931–2024), Russian shot-putter and javelin thrower

== See also ==
- Galene, one of the Nereid mermaids
