= Halyna =

Halyna is a Ukrainian feminine given name. The Russian equivalent is Galina and the Belarusian equivalent is Halina. Diminutives include Halya (Галя), Halka (Галька). Notable people with the name include:

- Halyna Hutchins (1979–2021), Ukrainian cinematographer
- Halyna Kuzmenko (1897–1978), Ukrainian anarchist
- Halyna Lozko (born 1952), Ukrainian ethnologist
- Halyna Mazepa (1910–1995), Ukrainian artist
- Halyna Petrosanyak (born 1969), Ukrainian poet
- Halyna Skipalska (born 1974), Ukrainian feminist
- Halyna Stelmashchuk (born 1943), Ukrainian scientist
- Halyna Yanchenko (born 1988), Ukrainian politician
- Halyna Zubchenko (1929–2000), Ukrainian artist
