= Gala (given name) =

Gala is a feminine given name with multiple origins from different cultures. As a Spanish name, it is a feminine version of the name Gallus, derived either from a Latin cognomen meaning rooster or meaning "man from Gaul". Saint Gall was a 6th-century saint. It is also a Russian diminutive form of the name Galina, from the Greek name Galênê meaning "calm", or a variant of the name Helen. As an English name, it might be used in reference to the word gala, meaning "festival".

== People ==
- Gala Aleksić (born 1969), Serbian actress
- Gala Čaki (born 1987), Serbian painter, art collector, and organizer of the Gala International Symposium of Art
- Sofía Gala Castiglione Casanova (born 1987), Argentine actress known as Sofía Gala
- Gala Dalí (1894–1982), born Elena Ivanovna Diakonova, Russian-born wife of poet Paul Éluard and later of artist Salvador Dalí, who were both prominent in surrealism, and a muse for many other writers and artists
- Gala Évora (born 1983), Spanish singer and actress
- Gala León García (born 1973), Spanish professional tennis player
- Gala Montes (born 2000), Mexican actress
- Gala Porras-Kim (born 1984), Colombian interdisciplinary artist who lives and works in Los Angeles
- Gala Rizzatto (born 1975), Italian pop singer and songwriter known as Gala

== Pen name ==
- Gala Galaction, pen name of Romanian Orthodox clergyman, theologian, writer, journalist, and left-wing activist Grigore or Grigorie Pisculescu

== See also ==
- Gala Varo, stage name of drag performer Jesús Meza Arroyo, also known as Josué Armez
