= Halina Regulska =

Polish racing driver and author

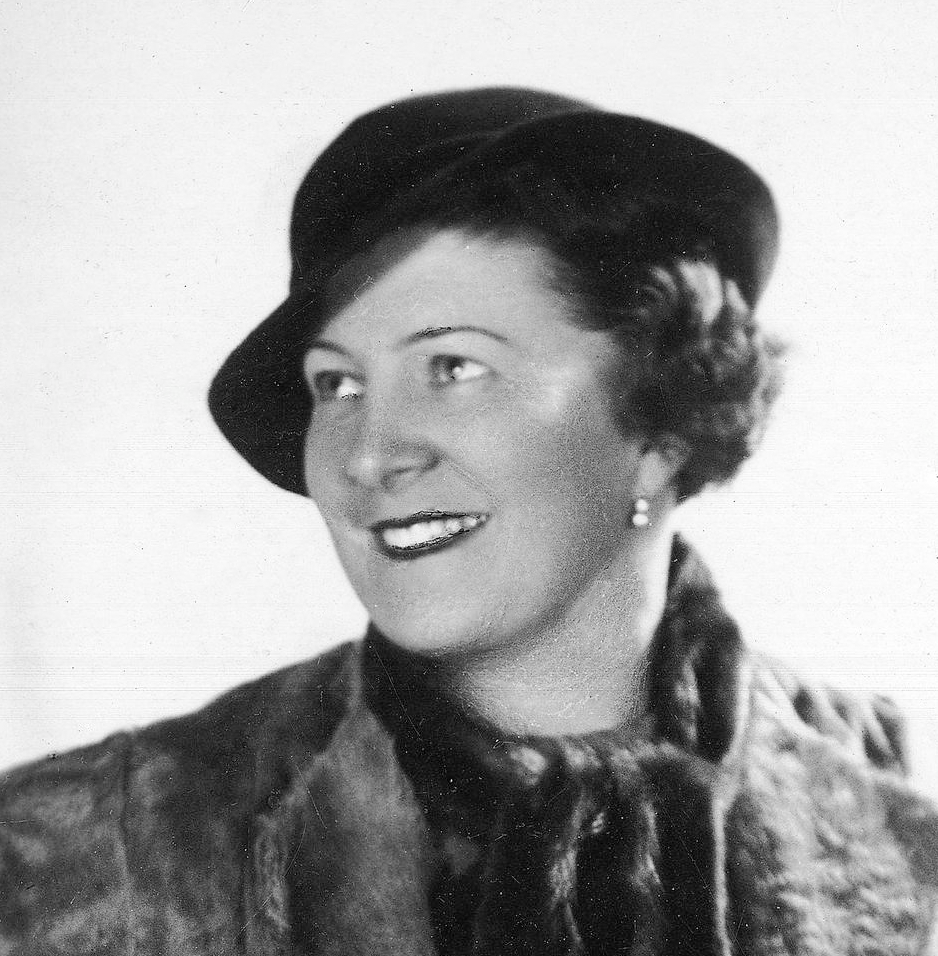
- Interwar portrait of Regulska
- Born: Halina Maciejowska; 14 December 1899; Zawiercie
- Died: December 1994 (aged 94–95); Warsaw, Poland
- Occupations: racing driver, writer
- Spouse: Janusz Regulski
- Children: Jerzy Regulski; Hanna Chudzyńska

Halina Regulska (née Maciejowska) (14 December 1899 – December 1994) was a Polish racing driver, socialite, a member of the underground Polish resistance movement in World War II who took part in the Warsaw Uprising, and an author.

== Early life ==
Halina Maciejowska was born in Zawiercie on 14 December 1899, the daughter of Klementyna (née Czerwińska) and Ignacy Maciejowski.

After the creation of the Second Polish Republic in 1918, in the aftermath of the First World War, Halina Maciejowska co-organised the Komitet Opieki nad Żołnierzem Polskim (Committee for the Protection of Polish Soldiers). The committee supplied clothes and organised food and medicine for soldiers fighting on the borders of the newly established Republic of Poland. She prepared to take part in the Silesian Uprisings (1919–1921) by completing a Red Cross course, keen to support the Polish nationalist drive to bring what was part of the Weimar Republic into the newly founded Polish Republic. When living in Dąbrowa Basin, she organised a banner welcoming home the troops who had fought at the Battle of Lemberg (1918) (also known as the Defense of Lwów).

== Marriage ==
In November 1919, Halina Maciejowska married Janusz Regulski, a wealthy industrialist fourteen years her senior, becoming known as Halina Regulska. In 1923, inflation was ruinously high and the Polish marka was rapidly devaluating, so Regulski decided to invest his fortune in a property called "Zarybie" on the edge of the village of Żółwin, Masovian Voivodeship, not far from the garden city, Podkowa Leśna. The property was initially two acres with small buildings. Regulska recalled years later:

The location of Zarybie was exceptionally beautiful. To the north and west it was surrounded by an old, tall pine forest, and to the south and east the space was open and free and drowned in sun and light'. Over time, the plot grew to forty hectares. A grand villa stood on it. And right next door, the fashionable Podkowa Leśna housing estate began to emerge. The family had the house rebuilt and the small plot of land was soon transformed into a 40-acre French style formal garden, with volleyball and cricket pitches and a tennis court. In time, the Regulski family managed to create a thriving self-sufficient farm with its own dairy, greenhouses, orchard and arable fields".

The couple's daughter Hanna was born in 1920 (d. Manila 1997) and their son Jerzy Regulski was born in the house in 1924.

The nearest railway station in Brwinów was nearly three kilometres away from the house and it was decided that they needed to acquire a car. In 1923 Regulska decided she wanted to learn to drive but her family were not keen. Her husband initially thought she was too delicate to drive heavy car and she practiced driving in secret, taking lessons with a representative of the Tatra company (who had sold the Regulskis a car). She took the driving test with an examiner next to her side and her teacher in the back seat, along with her husband, who joined them at last minute. There was a near mishap with a tram but the examiner passed her as she had demonstrated the ability to start the engine and maneuver the gears, and would improve with practice.

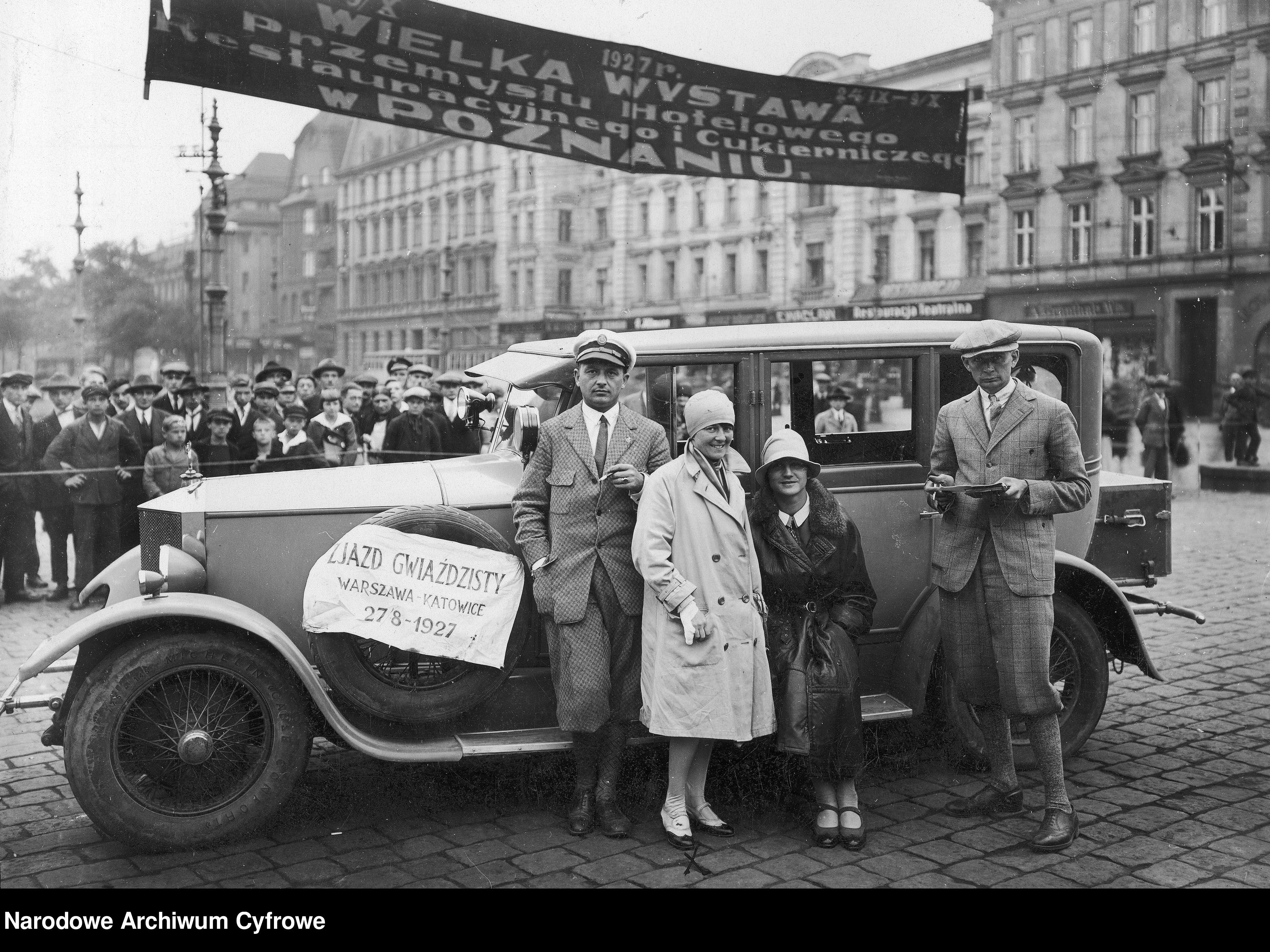
Halina and Janusz Regulski at a convention of automobilists in Katowice (1927)

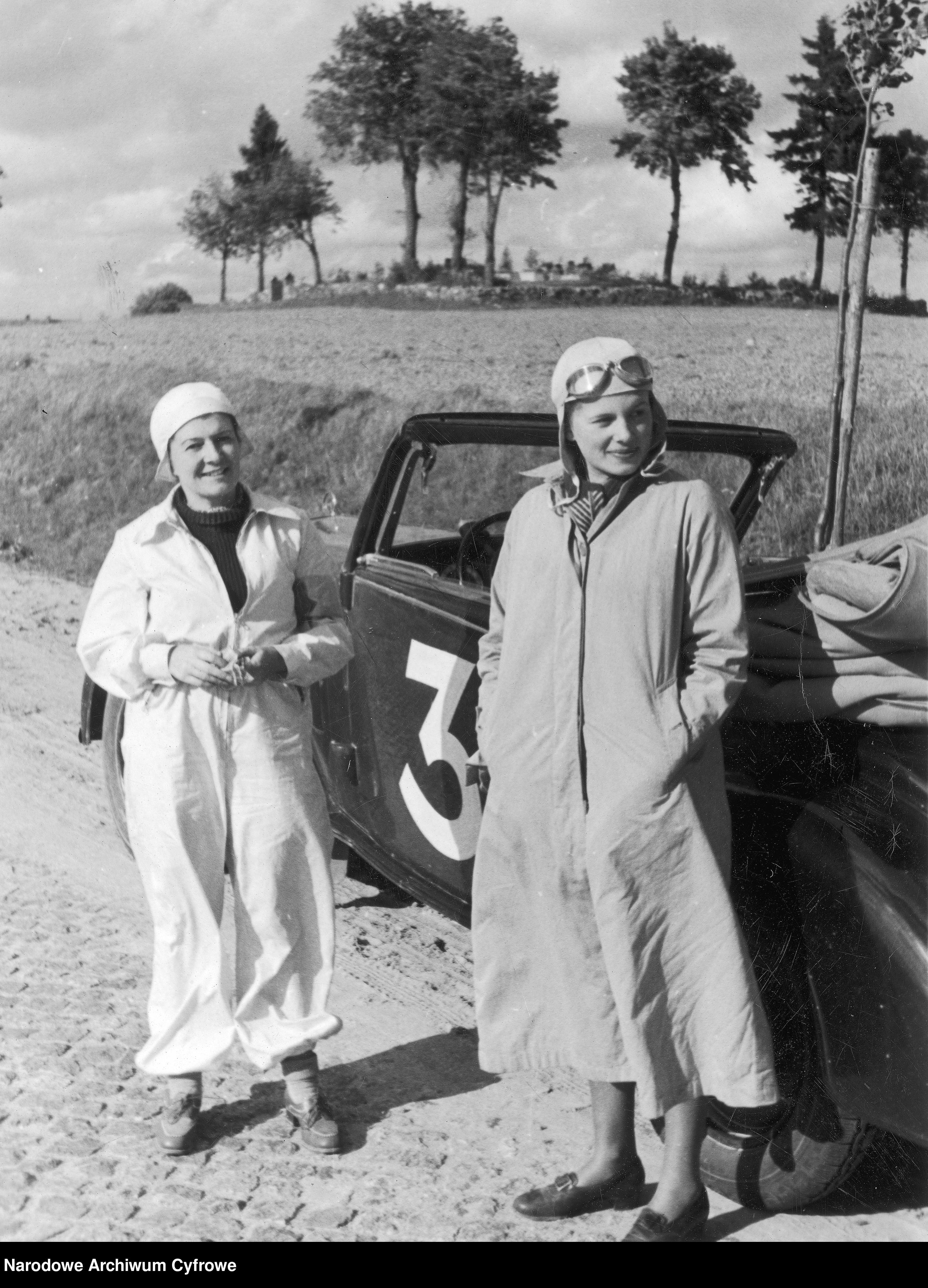
Halina Regulska (left) during a stop on the rally route

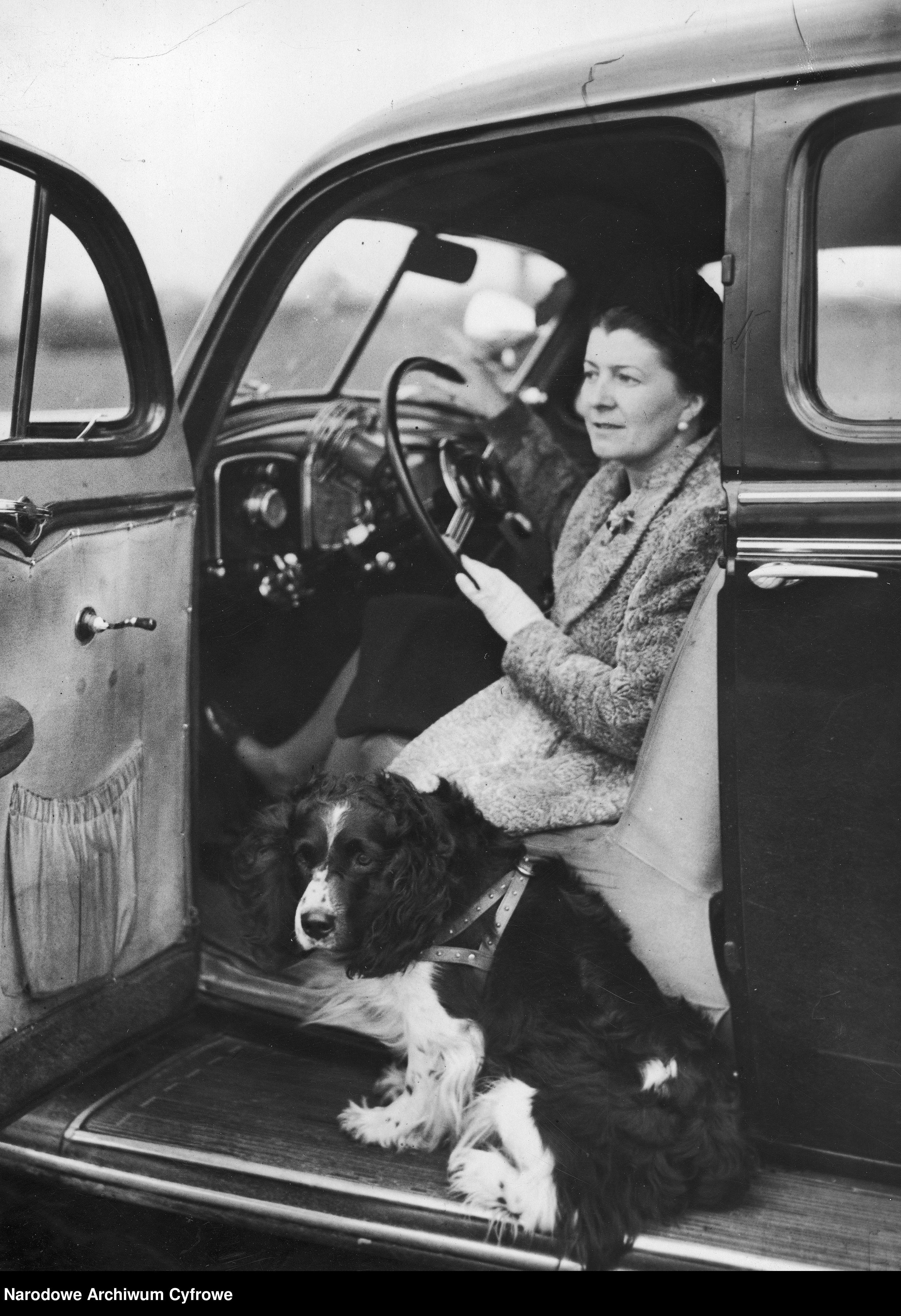
Halina Regulska at the wheel (1938)

== Motor racing ==
The Regulskis' shared passion was motoring. The first car they bought was a Tatra T 30 with a four-cylinder air-cooled engine. Janusz Regulski first took part in a car rally in 1925. He was involved in the organisation of automobile sport and from 1926 was chairman of the sports committee of the Automobile Club of Poland and vice-president of the organisation. In 1926 Halina Regulska took part in her first rally. She became known as a very talented competitor. In the same year, the Regulski family exchanged their Tatra for a Métallurgique limousine, and soon also bought a Bugatti T37 sports car.

In 1927, Regulska placed in the lead in the 2nd Ladies' Rally at the wheel of the Métallurgique. The two-day rally took place on the route between Warsaw and Poznań (and back), a distance of 660km. She drew the attention of the sports reporter of the "Auto" monthly, who wrote about her: "Mrs Regulska, winner of the fifth prize, left everyone in awe, because it is hard to believe that such a petite person could drive a huge and heavy limousine to its destination in perfect shape".

The following year, the rally had three stages and the route was 1,200km long. Regulska, at the wheel of a lightweight Fiat 509, won the first three prizes: in the general classification, for the best time on the flat test and for the best time on the mountain test.

During the Great Depression, rallying was suspended. Only agility trials, then known as 'Gymkhanas', were held, in which Regulska usually won, beating other women and sometimes male competitors. When the economic situation in Poland began to improve, rallying returned. In 1936, Halina Regulska, driving a new Chrysler, won the Ladies' Rally. In the next rally, she drove a Steyr-Daimler-Puch 150 provided by the importer.

In 1931, the Regulskis moved into their new house in "Zarybie". Halina Regulska became involved in the campaign to build a church on the estate, heading the finance subcommittee of the Church Building Committee. She made use of her many social connections to raise funds, including persuading the Automobile Club of Warsaw and the Polish Aero Club to join the campaign. Sponsors of the creation of the church included the Bank Spółek Zarobkowych, the Union of Cement Factories, the Union of Coal Mines and numerous banks. For her contribution to the building the church, she was awarded the papal order Pro Ecclesia et Pontifice, the highest Catholic honour that could be awarded to women at the time.

The couple were also keen on aviation and an airstrip for small planes was set up at Zarybie.

Regulska was a socialite. As the wife of the president of the Automobile Club of Poland, she organised dance and bridge evenings. She was described a "tomboy, but feminine". She could be elegant behind the wheel, and would travel through Warsaw with a fox fur around her neck. However, she detested parading and exaggeration during races and usually wore a loose overalls and a kerchief on her head for those occasions.

The Regulskis also had a passion for motor tourism. The couple travelled around Western Europe and North Africa with their children Jerzy and Hanna. They travelled in an Austro-Daimler, which replaced the Métallurgique. They published stories from these journeys in the monthly magazine "Auto". Their travels through Europe and Africa in 1930 covered 17,000km. The Regulskis brought back a lot of souvenirs from their tour of Africa, which they displayed in the so-called Moroccan Room in their home. Most of these mementos were looted by the Germans stationed there in 1939.

== Second World War ==
During the Siege of Warsaw in 1939, Halina Regulska was a member of the Civic Guard, (her husband was the commandant) and she worked in a hospital as an orderly alongside their daughter Hanna (nicknamed Hanka). Regulska later describes the time as "Scenes out of Dante." Their Lancia Aprilia, bought in 1938, which Janusz Regulski drove around Warsaw on his duties in the Civic Guard, was completely destroyed by an artillery shell explosion.

Later, Regulska organised care for university staff displaced from Adam Mickiewicz University in Poznań by the war. With the encouragement of family and friends, Regulska organised a safe house for people in the Polish underground movement. Those who stayed in the "Zarybie", usually on false papers, included Czesław Miłosz, Halina and Bernard Zakrzewski, Zofia Korbońska and Stefan Korboński, Jerzy Iłłakowicz, Bolesław Sobociński, Julian Piasecki and Zbigniew Stypułkowski. The Regulski family issued false employment documents to many people, protecting them from being taken away to work in Germany. A receiving station was placed in the barn and radio monitoring was carried out, and at night, airdrops of weapons were intercepted.

During the 1944 Warsaw Uprising Regulska was a "peżetka", the nickname given to around 200 women working in the Pomoc Żołnierzowi (PŻ). They organised over 30 inns for rest and recuperation for the Polish insurgents, providing food, laundry and repairing clothes, care for the wounded and the chance to rest. She served under the pseudonym "Ofka" in Detachment VI of Bureau of Information and Propaganda at Home Army Headquarters, in the PŻ at 22 Pańska Street, and with units around the city. After the collapse of the uprising, she left the capital with the civilian population and managed to return to the Zarybie house after escaping from a convoy. Her daughter Hanna was less lucky. She was part of the Polish underground resistance and in 1943, fearing arrest, had moved to the Lvov region, where she was remained active. After participating in the Warsaw Uprising, Hanna was taken prisoner and moved through concentration camps in Stalag VIII-B, Stalag IV-B, Zeitheim near Mühlberg, Stalag IV-E and Stalag VI-C. She survived and after liberation was flown to London as a witness to events in Poland.

== Post war period ==
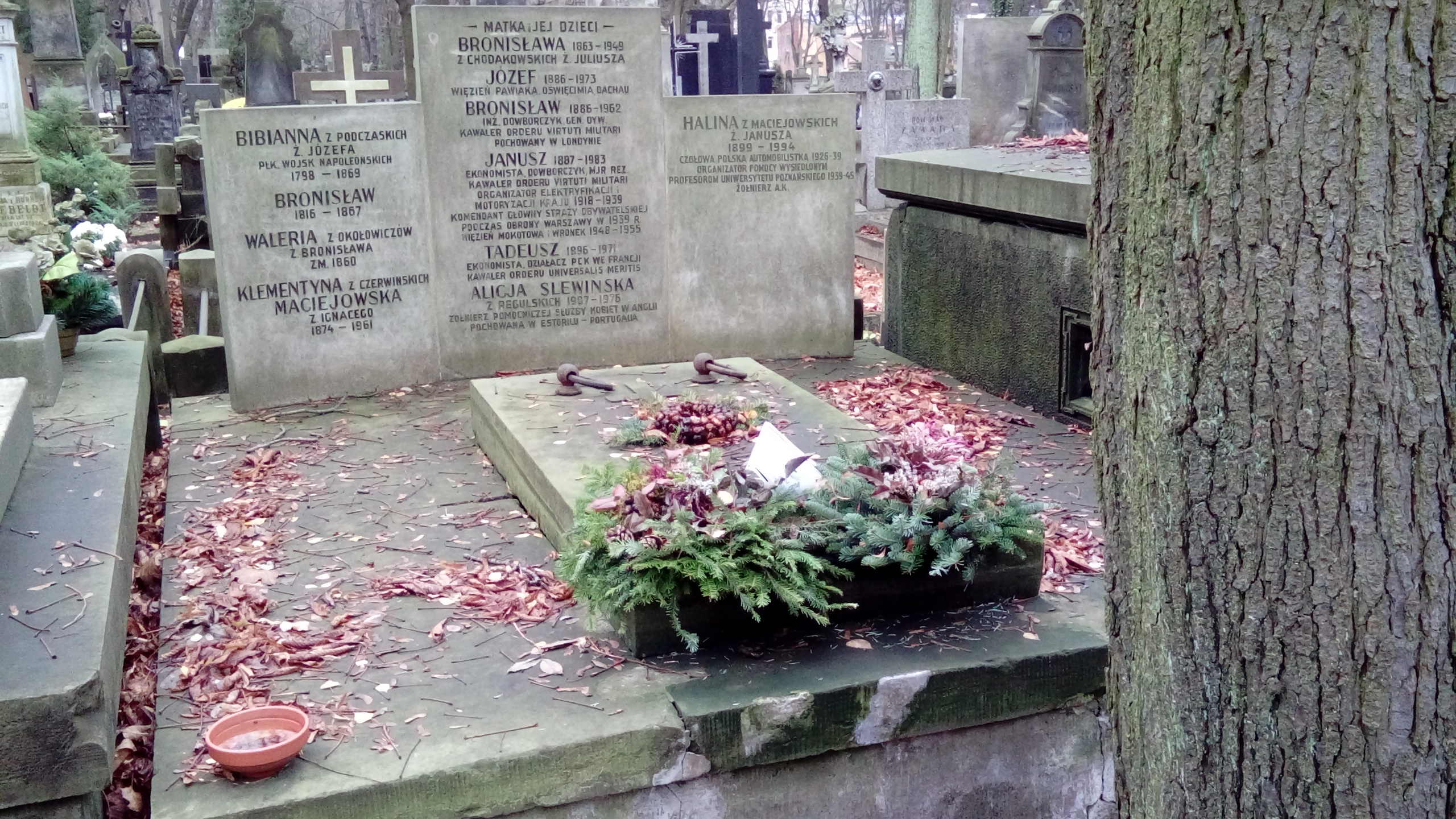
Grave of Janusz and Halina Regulski at Powązki cemetery

After the war, Regulski was sentenced to 14 years in prison and his property was confiscated for his contacts with the underground. (Their son Jerzy had been arrested earlier). Halina Regulska was left charge of the Zarybie house with five elderly family members in her care. The house was owned jointly with her husband so she retained it but the local authorities forced additional tenants into the house. Regulski was released from prison after seven years and in 1959, after selling the Zarybie house to Seventh-day Adventist Church, the Regulskis settled in Warsaw.

She died in 1994 and was buried in the family grave at Powązki Cemetery in Warsaw (cemetery section B-4-11,12).

== Publications ==
Halina Regulska published two volumes of memoirs from the siege of Warsaw and the years of occupation in the Second World War: Dziennik z oblężonej Warszawy and Tamte lata, tamte czasy: wspomnienia z II wojny światowej. She also wrote the book Samochodem przez dwudziestolecie.

== In popular culture ==
The character of Halina Regulska appeared in Ałbena Grabowska's novel Stulecie Winnych. In the TV series of the book, Stulecie Winnych, the role of Regulska is played by actress Marta Ojrzyńska.
