= HealthRight International =

US-based non-profit organization

- Formation: 1990
- Founder: Jonathan Mann
- Headquarters: New York, New York
- CEO: Peter Navario
- Website: healthright.org

HealthRight International, formerly known as Doctors of the World-USA, is a global health organization, based in New York City. HealthRight was founded in 1990 by physician and human rights advocate Jonathan Mann.

They work to guarantee that marginalized communities have equitable access to healthcare, in the intersection of public health and human rights. By ensuring marginalized populations have access to social, health, and mental services, introducing social technologies, expanding the field of health and social services, and enhancing the capabilities of civil society organizations, they aim to improve life quality and enable marginalized populations to exercise basic rights.

Headquartered in New York, HealthRight has worked in over 30 countries, with current projects in Kenya, Ukraine, Uganda, the United States, and Vietnam.

== History and Organization ==
HealthRight International was founded in 1990 by Jonathan Mann as he perceived a void in the health and human rights organizations within the United States. He set out to form a special organization to develop long-term initiatives to advance and defend health and human rights both domestically and overseas.

During the Haitian Refugees Crisis in Guantanamo Bay in 1993, HealthRight International, then still known as Doctors of the World-USA, was present in the camp. The witnessing of the atrocities led Doctors of the World-USA to be very outspoken about condemning and criticizing the camp.

=== Subsidiaries ===
==== Ukrainian Foundation for Public Health (UFPA) ====
The Ukrainian Foundation for Public Health was founded in 2008 as a country specific subsidiary to HealthRight International. Country Director for Ukraine and UFPA's CEO is Halyna Skipalska. UFPA have focused on expanding HealthRight International's mission throughout Ukraine in close cooperation with Ukrainian Ministries of Health and of Social Policy. Specifically focusing on young women and girls, their partners and children in difficult living circumstances, as well as pregnant women and young mothers at risk of abandoning their newborn infants or deprivation of parental rights. As well as at-risk adolescents and HIV-positive teenagers and their family members and adolescents, youth, and women in conflict with the law.

=== Merger ===
The Peter C. Alderman Foundation (PCAF) is a foundation dedicated to providing medical professionals and other indigenous caregivers with the resources to treat mental anguish utilizing Western medical techniques mixed with regional healing traditions in order to lessen the suffering of victims of terrorism and mass violence in post-conflict nations.

On April 23, 2018, HealthRight and PCAF announced their merger in order to better serve the mental health requirements of the underserved communities they work with globally. The merger allowed PCAF to incorporate its vast knowledge and expertise in global mental health across HealthRight's current and future programs. Since 2018, PCAF has been operating as the Peter C. Alderman Program for Global Mental Health.

For the past several years HealthRight International has hosted the HEALTH + HUMAN RIGHTS AWARDS. PCAF supports HealthRight's work leveraging global resources to address local health challenges, supporting health programs for communities around the world.

== Current project areas ==
=== HIV ===
Launched in 2019, the innovative SACCO Health and Wellness project aims to increase testing among men by partnering with the Transportation Savings Credit and Cooperative Organization (SACCO) for boda boda, local motorbike transportation, drivers. This is done by integrating mental health intervention alongside HIV education and testing models to address the mental health consequences of COVID-19 and enhance HIV outcomes. The program was piloted in Kitale, Kenya, in 2018–2019, where it successfully tested 5,000 men and their partners for HIV. Recently, HealthRight International joined the Gilead Zeroing In conference discussing the SACCO project.

== Response to the 2022 Russian invasion of Ukraine ==
HealthRight/UFPH is one of a select group of NGOs that continued to assist vulnerable communities and war survivors within Ukraine. HealthRight has doubled its personnel in Ukraine over the first five months following the beginning of the war.

They have placed a specific focus on Reproductive, Maternal, Newborn, Child, and Adolescent Health of the displaced populations, specifically reproductive health. Additionally, the Ukrainian Foundation for Public Health, with support from UNICEF, has put on 50 mobile response teams consisting of social workers, lawyers, physicians, and psychologists, to help displaced Ukrainians at reception points across the country, offering specialist expertise and advice to the thousands who need it.

== Legal status and size ==
HealthRight is a 501(c)(3) organization, with recent annual revenue of about US$4.8 million.
