= Halyna Skipalska =

Ukrainian feminist activist

- Галина Скіпальська
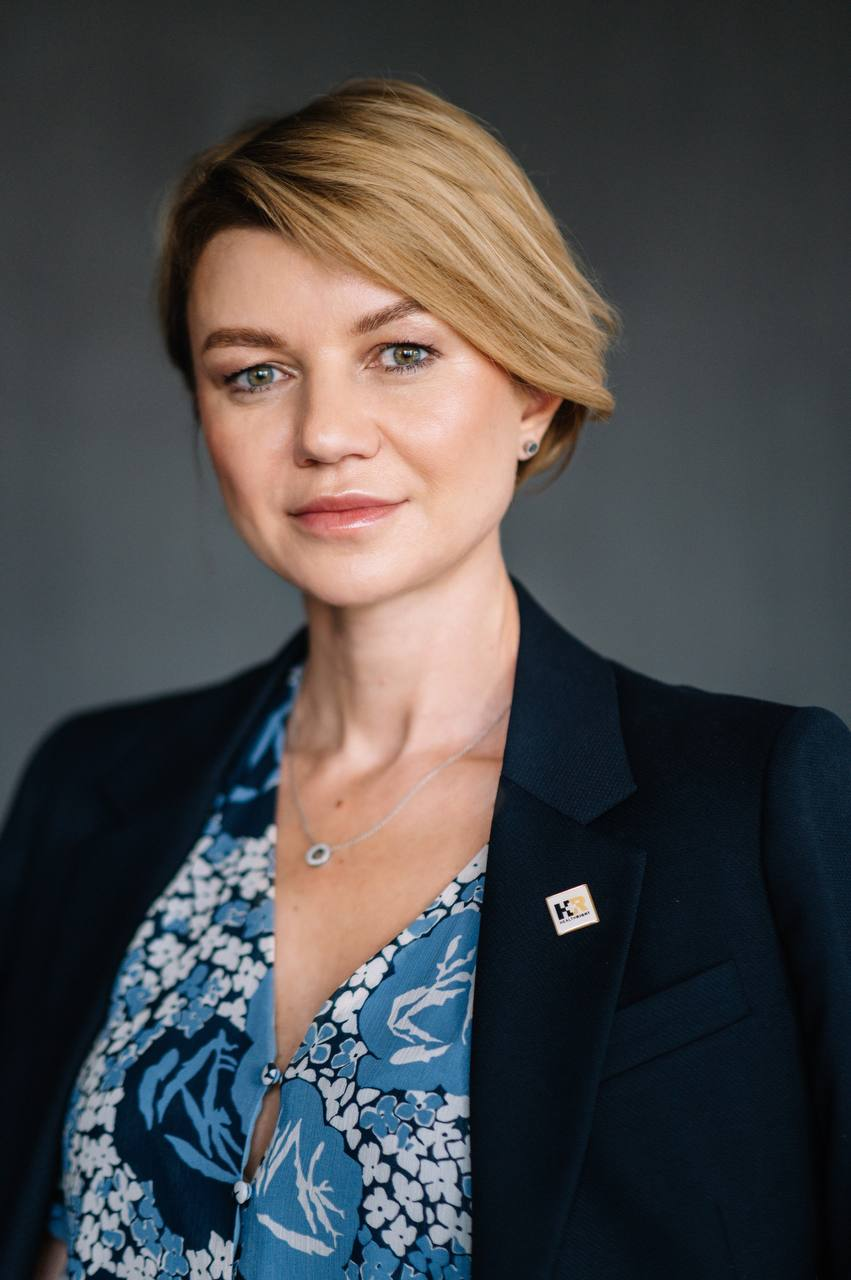
- Born: 18 December 1974 (age 51); Lviv, Ukrainian SSR
- Awards: Voices of Courage by Women's Refugee Commission

Halyna Skipalska (Ukrainian: Гали́на Богда́нівна Скіпа́льська; born 18 December 1974, Lviv, Ukraine) is a Ukrainian feminist and an expert in the fields of gender-based violence, including domestic violence, HIV/AIDS prevention, and the development of social and psychological services for women from vulnerable groups. She is HealthRight International's Country Director for Ukraine and CEO of the International Charitable Foundation (ICF) “Ukrainian Foundation for Public Health” established by HealthRight International.

She has acted as the director of the projects funded by Elton John AIDS Foundation, UN Women, UNICEF, and UNFPA. She has been a member of the Ukrainian Charity Forum Board, Public Council at Ministry of Social Policy of Ukraine and Ministry of Health of Ukraine, Public Council at the Inter-Factional Deputy Association “Equal Opportunities”, Public Association “Coalition of the Reanimation Package of Reforms”. She was the Head of the Section on Ratification of the Istanbul Convention, a member of the UN Women Advisory Council in Europe and Central Asia, and a member and founder of the Council at the Ukrainian Child Rights Network. Since at least 2008, she has been publicly active in protecting the rights and improving the life quality of girls, women, and children in difficult life circumstances resulting from violence, armed conflict, poverty and homelessness. Skipalska has been actively involved in development of the social sphere, child rights protection, and necessary and available social services for community children.

== Life ==
Skipalska was born 18 December 1974 in Lviv, Ukraine. In 1991, she graduated from the Lviv Secondary School #18 with the gold medal and entered Ivan Franko National University of Lviv, Faculty of Applied Mathematics and Informatics later that year. She graduated with honors in 1996 as a “Mathematician”. From 1997 to 2001, she was engaged in postgraduate studies at Lviv State Institute of Information Infrastructure, where she later worked as a research fellow from 2000 to 2002 while being dealing with mathematical modeling of environmental issues.

In 2000–2001, Skipalska worked as an assistant at Lviv Polytechnic National University. In January–September 2002, as a scholarship holder from the Government of Austria and Government of Sweden, she trained at International Institute for Applied Systems Analysis (IIASA) (Vienne, Austria), worked on her dissertation titled “Mathematical Modeling of the Carbon Cycle” to finish her academic research under the same topic in June–August 2004, as a scholarship holder from UNESCO / Keizo Obuchi Research Fellowships Programme at the Technical Institute (Bielsko-Biala, Poland). She graduated as a Master with Honors under the “Public Management and Administration” Specialty from Kyiv International University. Since 2020, she has been studying as a postgraduate of the Social Work Board at Borys Grinchenko Kyiv Metropolitan University. As a postgraduate at its Social Pedagogics Board, she was successful with defending her dissertation titled “Social Support for Female Victims of Domestic Violence Provided by Civic Society Organizations and Charities” to become a Ph.D. in Social work.

== Career ==
Halyna Skipalska has been working in the public sector since 2002, when she became CEO of Galician Apothecary, a charitable foundation which works in the field of healthcare with a special focus on providing care for vulnerable populations, such as children and elderly, promoting healthy lifestyles, women's health, and capacity building for employees in pharmaceutical and medical areas. Skipalska was also an editor of the printed media issued by CF “Galician Apothecary”: the “Galician Pharmacy” Magazine (2003–2005) and “Your Pharmacy” Newspaper (2003–2005).

In 2005, she started working as a PR Manager at the office of the Charitable Organization For Every Child and EU Project “Development of Integrated Social Services”.

=== HealthRight Ukraine ===
Skipalska worked as a coordinator of USAID Projects such as “Prevention of Abandonment of Children by HIV-Positive Mothers” (MAMA+) from 2006 to 2008. She started her work as the Country Director of HealthRight International in Ukraine in 2008. Since 2008, she has been working as the CEO of the International Charitable Foundation (ICF) “Ukrainian Foundation for Public Health” established by HealthRight International.

Skipalska has been acting as the official speaker and an expert on domestic violence, prevention of human trafficking, HIV and AIDS, etc. on behalf of HealthRight International in Ukraine. She was one of the signatories of the Memorandum on Cooperation and Partnership between the Ministry of Social Policy of Ukraine, International Charitable Foundation (ICF) “Ukrainian Foundation for Public Health” and HealthRight International in Ukraine (September 2021), the Ministry of Health of Ukraine, Public Health Center of MOH Ukraine, Office of the Ukrainian Parliament Commissioner for Human Rights, etc.

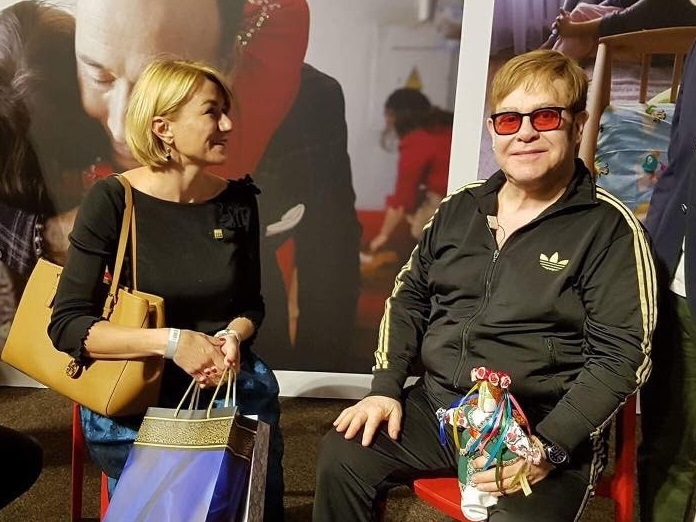
Skipalska and Elton John at a meeting with clients and employees of a social apartment in Kyiv (May 2018)

In 2014, Skipalska launched yet another direction of mental care for ATO/UFO veterans, former prisoners of war and their family members under the “Human Rights Clinic” Project. Since the very beginning of the full-scale war, the team led by Halyna Skipalska started working to assist internally displaced women and children as well as victims of gender-based and sexual violence caused by the war. HealthRight in Ukraine launched a social initiative under a project of multisectoral support for IDPs and those affected by the war – a network of children centers known as “BigLittle” for internally displaced families in Vinnytsia, Zakarpattia and Lviv Oblasts; launched the Project “Response and Care Units (RCUs): Integrating Essential GBV Survivor Care in Eastern and Southern Ukraine” (Brave&Safe), etc. In 2022, she took part in an event on “Healthcare in Armed Conflicts”.

In 2023, Skipalska's activities were recognized by the Voices of Courage Awards for assistance to women and children during the war established by the Women's Refugee Commission for global leaders standing for justice, gender equality, lives and rights of refugee children and women, which according to Halyna Skipalska, “…was a joint achievement of our team working in HealthRight International and ICF “Ukrainian Foundation for Public Health” as well as tens of our partners and donors.”

=== Ukrainian Foundation for Public Health ===
As the CEO of the International Charitable Foundation (ICF) “Ukrainian Foundation for Public Health”, Skipalska has been coordinating the introduction of innovative social work techniques in Ukraine to work with women, children and youth in difficult life circumstances. The techniques have been introduced jointly with the Ministry of Social Policy of Ukraine, Ministry of Health of Ukraine, State Penitentiary Service of Ukraine, local self-governance bodies and those initialized by the state. Among the current models being introduced are prevention from abandonment of children born by mothers in difficult life circumstances; prevention of social orphanhood through early detection of families in need and their involvement in comprehensive follow-up of related cases; support of teenagers in conflict with law, etc.

The projects implemented by the Foundation include the HealthRight Service Center for Girls and Young Women in Difficult Life Circumstances established in Kyiv to provide comprehensive social and psychological services, including outreach services, HIV and other serious disease testing in teenagers and women from risk groups, which specifically includes women in conflict with law (jointly with the Kyiv City Center of Social Services for Family, Children and Youth, 2010); projects on prevention on violence against girls and children involving 49 mobile social and psychological aid units, 9 shelters for female victims of violence and 4 day care centers (jointly with the Ministry of Social Policy of Ukraine, funded by UNFPA since 2012); social apartments for pregnant women and young mothers with children in the city of Kyiv – a temporary shelter and rehab site for women in difficult life circumstances to prevent abandonment of children and prevention of domestic violence providing services for 23 mothers with 23 children annually (since 2013). International Charitable Foundation (ICF) “Ukrainian Foundation for Public Health” won a tender to implement the tasks posed under the Kyiv City Target Program “Children. Family. Capital for 2019-2021” in 2020 in order to provide support for young mothers with children and women in difficult life circumstances.

In 2018, Skipalska launched the “SupportMe” Project on support and development of adolescent health. She took part in the working group at MOH Ukraine on elaboration of legal amendments to simplify access to information on personal health and choice of a doctor and medical services for adolescents older than 14 years old without mandatory presence and consent of their parents or other legal representatives.

During the COVID-19 pandemic, attention was focused on the higher risk of domestic violence cases during the lockdown in Ukraine. Since the beginning of the Russian invasion into Ukraine in 2022, she has worked in the field of child safety, physical or sexual violence and harassment towards other persons. In response to numerous violations of rights of women and girls caused by hostilities in Ukraine, the “SafeWomenHUB” platform was established to provide urgent psychological, humanitarian and social-legal aid and to raise awareness of prevention of sexual violence, sexual exploitation and human trafficking. Since the beginning of the full-scale invasion, the platform has been used as the basis for its umbrella organizations to operate 82 mobile psychosocial aid teams for victims of the war.

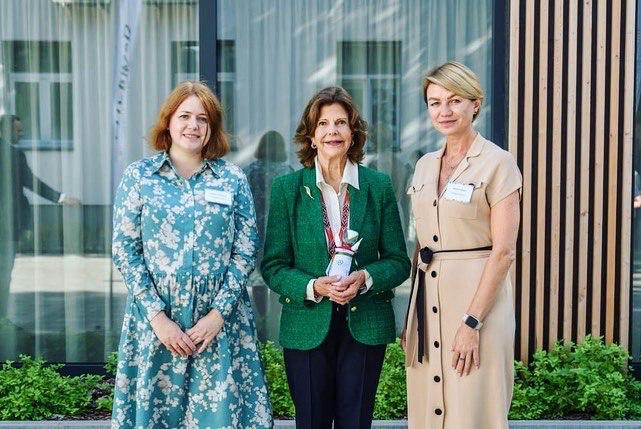
Skipalska at a meeting with Queen Silvia of Sweden in 2023.

As of 2023, the Foundation supported by the United Nations International Children's Emergency Fund (UNICEF) has established and been operating 12 Barnahus centers to protect and support children affected by or considered witnesses of violence.

International Charitable Foundation (ICF) “Ukrainian Foundation for Public Health”, jointly with the Mykolaiv City Council, won the tender announced by the Ministry of Social Policy of Ukraine, took part in the State Program on Establishment of Resilience Centers under the “How are you?” National Mental Health Program initiated by the First Lady of Ukraine, Mrs. Olena Zelenska, and established the first Resilience Center in Mykolaiv Region.

=== Coalition of the Reanimation Package of Reforms ===
Since 2019, Skipalska has been a member of the Public Association “Coalition of the Reanimation Package of Reforms”.

== Activism ==
In March 2018, 2019, 2020 and 2023, Skipalska was a presenter at the United Nations Commission on the Status of Women held in New York.

As a resident of Kotsyubyns'ke Town, Skipalska advocated for the establishment of a psychological aid center for women in difficult life circumstances and their family members in the town in 2014–2019. She was an active participant of environmental events of her fellow townsfolk and was an active author at the community official website.

== Awards and recognition ==
- 2013 – “Social Work Master” Honor from the Kyiv City State Administration
- 2022 – “Charitable Ukraine 2021” – Runner-up of the “Manager of the Year in Charity” Nomination
- 2023 – “Voices of Courage” Award from the Women's Refugee Commission (New York)
- 2023 – Certificate of Honor for fruitful cooperation with the Ukrainian Parliament Commissioner for Human Rights in 2023
- 2023 – “Women. Peace. Safety.” Order awarded by the National Council of Ukrainian Women

== Publications ==
- Robbins, C., Zapata, L., Kissin, D., Shevchenko, N., Yorick, R., Skipalska, H., Finnerty, E., Ornstein, T., Marchbanks, P., Jamieson, D., Hillis, S. (2010). Multicity HIV seroprevalence in street youth, Ukraine. International Journal of STD & AIDS, 21(7), July 2010, pp. 489-96.
- Zapata, L., Kissin, D., Robbins, C., Finnerty, E., Skipalska, H., Yorick, R., Jamieson, D., Marchbanks, P., Hillis, S. (2010). Multi-city assessment of lifetime pregnancy involvement among street youth, Ukraine. American Journal of Epidemiology, June 2010, In: 43rd Annual Meeting of the Society-for-Epidemiologic-Research, Volume: 171
- Бєлякова А.В., Боголюбова О.М., Воробйовський О.В. та ін. Посібник з методики міждисциплінарного ведення випадку при роботі з безпритульними, бездоглядними дітьми : посіб. / за заг. ред. Г.Б. Скіпальської. Київ: Старт-98, 2010. 68 с.
- Журавель Т.В., Лях В.В., Лях Т.Л., Скіпальська Г.Б. Сходинки: просвітницько-профілактичні тренінгові заняття з підлітками : навч.-метод. посіб. / за наук. ред. І. Д. Звєрєвої. Київ: Видавничій дім «Калита», 2010. 164 с.
- Hillis, S., Zapata, L., Robbins, C., Kissin, D., Skipalska, H., Yorick, R., Finnerty, E., Marchbanks, P., Jamieson, D. (2011). HIV seroprevalence among orphaned and homeless youth: no place like home. AIDS (London, England), 26(1), pp. 105-10.
- Yorick, R., Skipalska, H., Suvorova, S., Sukovatova, O., Zakharov, K., Hodgdon, S. (2012). HIV Prevention and Rehabilitation Models for Women Who Inject Drugs in Russia and Ukraine . Advances in preventive medicine [online], 5 December 2012, 2012:316871.
- Yorick, R., Skipalska, H., Grytsaienko, N., Hodgdon, S. (2012). Targeted, gender-sensitive support for street girls: linking the most vulnerable to care. In: XIX International AIDS Conference, Washington, DC, July 2012
- Tripathi, V., King, E., Finnerty, E., Koshovska-Kostenko, N., Skipalska, H. (2013). Routine HIV counseling and testing during antenatal care in Ukraine: A qualitative study of the experiences and perspectives of pregnant women and antenatal care providers. AIDS Care[online], 25(6), January 2013.
- Бондаровська В.М., Скіпальська Г.Б. та ін. Запобігання насильству в сім’ї у діяльності фахівців соціальної сфери : навч.-метод. посіб. / за заг. ред. В.М. Бондаровської, Т.В. Журавель, Ю.В. Пилипас. Київ: Видавничий дім «Калита», 2014. 282 с. ISBN 978-617-7152-14-8
- Веретенко Т.Г., Єсипенко О.М. та ін. Сходинки здоров’я для батьків : просвітницько-профілактична тренінгова програма : навч.-метод. посіб. / за заг. ред. Т.Л. Лях, Г.Б. Скіпальської. Київ : Видавничий дім «Калита», 2015. 156 с.
- Nerlander, L., Zapata, L., Yorick, R., Skipalska, H., Smith, R., Kissin, D., Jamieson, D., Vitek, C., Hillis, S. (2015). Behaviors Associated with a Risk of HIV Transmission From HIV-Positive Street Youth to Non–Street Youth in Ukraine. Sexually transmitted diseases, 42(9), September 2015, pp. 513-20.
- Бордіян Я. І., Журавель Т. В., Кулаковська О. Л., Скіпальська Г.Б. та ін. Попередження домашнього насильства щодо дівчат та жінок у м. Києві: модель, особливості, перспективи : посіб. Київ: Видавничий дім «Калита», 2017. 98 с.
- Брусенко О. Л., Журавель Т. В., Лях Т. Л. та ін. Сходинки до здоров'я: просвітницько-профілактична програма тренінгових занять : навч.-метод. посіб. / за ред. Т. В. Журавель., Т.В. Лях, Г.Б. Скіпальської Київ: Видавничий дім «Калита», 2017. 232 с.
- Dauria, E., Tolou-Shams, M., Skipalska, H., Hodgdon, S. (2018). Outcomes of the “STEPS” HIV prevention training program for young males in the penitentiary institution, Ukraine. International Journal of Prisoner Health [online]. 14(2):00-00, April 2018. Halyna Skipalska · Sara Hodgdon// International Journal of Prisoner Health 14(2):00-00 · April 2018
- Федорович Н. В., Скіпальська Г. Б., Краснолобова І. та ін. Створення та забезпечення діяльності притулків для осіб, постраждалих від домашнього насильства: метод. посіб. Київ : Видавничий дім «Калита», 2019. 176 с.
- Федорович Н.В., Скіпальська Г.Б., Цвєткова Н.М. Забезпечення діяльності мобільних бригад соціально-психологічної допомоги як спеціалізованих служб підтримки постраждалих осіб від домашнього насильства: метод. посіб. / за ред. Г.Б. Скіпальської, О.О. Кочемировської, Н.М. Цвєткової. Київ: 2020. 190 с.
- Демченко І., Булига Н., Савенко О., Скіпальська Г., Брагінська О. Питання підліткового здоров’я у медичній реформі: адвокаційний звіт. Київ: 2021. 28 с.
- Скіпальська Г.Б., Цвєткова Н.М., Файдюк О.В. Методичні рекомендації щодо діяльності мобільних бригад соціально-психологічної допомоги учасникам бойових дій АТО/ООС та членам їх родин: посіб. Київ : Видавництво КІМ, 2021. 28 с.
- Скіпальська Г., Лях Т., Клішевич Н. Аналіз зарубіжних практик протидії домашньому насильству в період пандемії COVID-19. Науковий вісник Ужгородського університету. 2021. №2 (49). С. 192–197.
- Лях Т., Лехолетова М., Скіпальська Г. Аналіз запитів населення щодо отримання соціально-психологічної допомоги та підтримки в умовах COVID-19. Вісник Київського національного університету імені Тараса Шевченка. Соціальна робота. 2021. № 1(7). С. 22–28. ISSN 2616-7778
- Скіпальська Г. Б., Лях Т. Л., Клішевич Н. А. Жінки, які постраждали від насильства, як об’єкт соціальної роботи. Ввічливість. Humanitas. 2021. №5. С. 82–89.
- Capasso, A., Skipalska H., Chakrabarti, U., Guttmacher, S., Navario, P., and Castillo, T. P. (2021). Patterns of Gender-Based Violence in Conflict-Affected Ukraine: A Descriptive Analysis of Internally Displaced and Local Women Receiving Psychosocial Services. Journal of Interpersonal Violence [online], 29 December 2021
- Capasso, A., Skipalska H., Guttmacher, S., Tikhonovsky, N. G., Navario, P., and Castillo, T. P. (2021). Factors associated with experiencing sexual violence among female gender-based violence survivors in conflict-afflicted eastern Ukraine. BMC Public Health [online]. 789 (2021), 24 April 2021.
- Capasso, A., Skipalska, H., Nadal, J., Zamostian, P., Kompaniiets, O., Navario, P., and Theresa, P. Castillo, T.P. (2022). Lessons from the field: Recommendations for gender-based violence prevention and treatment for displaced women in conflict-affected Ukraine. Lancet Regional Health - Europe 2022 [online], 6 May 2022.
- Rushwan S., Skipalska H., Capasso A., Navario P., Castillo T. (2023) Understanding Domestic Violence Among Older Women in Ukraine: A Secondary Analysis Using Gender-Based Violence Screening Data. Journal of Interpersonal Violence [online. 15 Dec 2023.]
