= Halina Seyda =

Polish banker and underground activist (1906–1944)

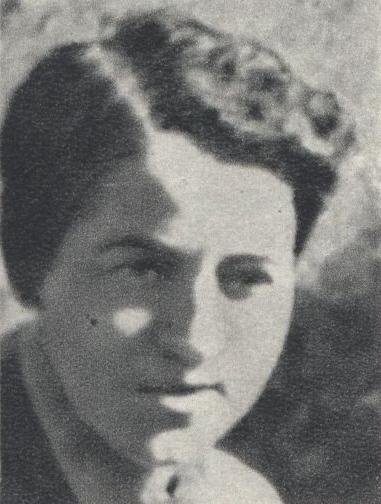
- Born: 1906
- Died: 22 February 1944, Warsaw Ghetto
- Other names: Halina Seyda (Seydowa); Szczytowa
- Occupations: Banker, resistance activist

Halina Seyda (Seydowa), pseudonym Szczytowa (1906 – 1944), Polish banker and underground activist during the German occupation of Poland during World War II. She organized the compilation and distribution of an underground newsletter for several years in Warsaw. She was executed by Nazi forces.

== Biography ==
Before September 1939, Halina Seyda was a banker at the Warsaw Branch of Powszechny Bank Związkowy (headquartered in Lviv, now Ukraine). During the German occupation, she held the same position at the Bank of Commercial Companies in Warsaw.

From October 1939, the Polish resistance organized radio monitoring and, on that basis, Seyda edited and reproduced a daily bulletin associated with the Union of Polish Syndicalists. At first it remained untitled, and then successively titled "AK Akcja," "Agencja Radiowa," "AR," and popularly known as "Paski." The bulletin started with a circulation of several hundred copies, increasing to 5,000 by the beginning of 1944.

Initially, the resistance duplicating plant was located in the Bank Spółek Zarobkowych on Zgoda Street in Warsaw. In the following months and years, copies of the information bulletin, as well as some other materials, were reproduced in at least a dozen clandestine duplicating plants scattered around the capital. By that time, it was a magazine and eventually became one of the organs of the Information Department of the Government Delegation for Poland. Seyda began by editing the magazine alone, but over time, she was joined by a large group of collaborators, including several employees of the Bank of Commercial Companies. By 1944, the editorial and distribution team had grown to about twelve people.

Seyda was credited with organizing the only fully successful escape of three women from the women's ward of Pawiak Police prison on 16 January 1942.

She was accidentally apprehended on the street on 4 February 1944, on the day of the funeral of SS-General Franz Kutschera, SS and Police Leader for the Warsaw District, who had been responsible for mass public executions in Warsaw. He was assassinated in an attack carried out by undercover Polish soldiers from the special unit of Kedyw of the Home Army Headquarters.

After finding incriminating materials on her when she was arrested, she was tortured at Gestapo headquarters on Szucha Avenue. On 8 February, she was transferred to Pawiak prison and placed in solitary confinement. She was shot dead on 22 February 1944, as part of a mass execution held among the ruins of the Jewish Warsaw Ghetto in German-occupied Poland.
