= Ałbena Grabowska =

Polish writer (born 1971)

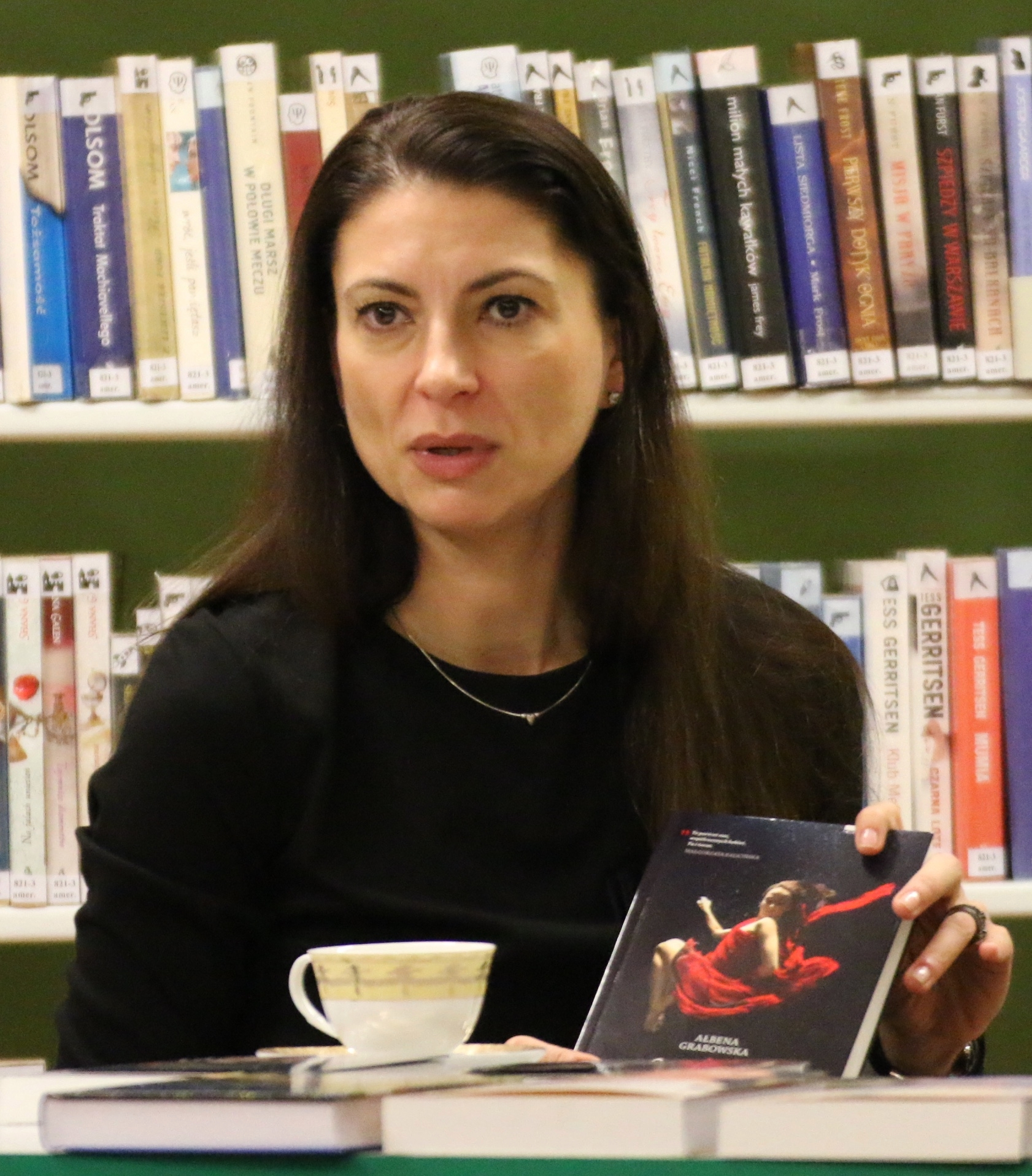
- Ałbena Grabowska, 2017
- Born: 1971 (age 54–55); Pruszków, Poland
- Education: Medical University of Warsaw
- Occupations: Writer, neurologist, epileptologist

Ałbena Grabowska (born 1971, Pruszków) is a Polish writer and neurologist. She is best known for her historical family saga Stulecie Winnych.

== Life and career ==
She was born in 1971 in Pruszków, Mazovian Voivodeship, Poland. She graduated from the Medical University of Warsaw and specializes in the treatment of epilepsy. On 27 October 2004, she obtained a doctoral degree in medicine. She worked at the Neurology and Epileptology Clinic in Warsaw as well as the Department of Pathophysiology and Electroencephalography of the Dziekanów Leśny Hospital. She also works in the Polish Epileptology Association. For many years, she worked as a columnist and published various medicine-related articles in the press.

She made her literary debut in 2011 when she published her first novel Tam, gdzie urodził się Orfeusz (The Place Where Orpheus Was Born). She writes books belonging both to adult and children's literature. In 2014, she became the ambassador of the "Women's Solidarity" social campaign. In 2015, she received the Pióro Award at the 4th Festival of Women's Literature in Siedlce for her best-selling three-volume historical family saga Stulecie Winnych.

In 2019, Stulecie Winnych was adapted into a TV series by Poland's national public broadcaster TVP 1 channel. It was directed by Piotr Trzaskalski and stars Kinga Preis, Olaf Lubaszenko, Adam Ferency, and Jan Wieczorkowski.

In 2020, she wrote the libretto to the Pora jeziora musical staged by the Warmian-Masurian Philharmonic. In 2023, she wrote the libretto to the Kopernik (Copernicus) musical staged by the Kraków Opera.

== Personal life ==
She is of Polish–Bulgarian descent and apart from Polish speaks fluent Bulgarian. She has three children: Julian, Alina and Franciszek.

== Works ==
- O małpce, która spadła z drzewa, Wydawnictwo TacyJakJa, 2010
- Tam, gdzie urodził się Orfeusz, Wydawnictwo Zwierciadło, 2011
- Julek i Maja w labiryncie, Wydawnictwo Akapit Press, 2011
- Coraz mniej olśnień, Wydawnictwo MWK, 2012
- Julek i Maja. Powrót do gry, Wydawnictwo Akapit Press, 2012
- Julek i Maja. Podróż w nieznane, Wydawnictwo Akapit Press, 2013
- Julek i Maja. Misja w czasie, Wydawnictwo Akapit Press, 2014
- Lot nisko nad ziemią, Wydawnictwo Zwierciadło, 2014
- Stulecie Winnych. Ci, którzy przeżyli, Vol. 1, Wydawnictwo Zwierciadło, 2014
- Stulecie Winnych. Ci, którzy walczyli, Vol. 2, Wydawnictwo Zwierciadło, 2015
- Stulecie Winnych. Ci, którzy wierzyli, Vol. 3, Wydawnictwo Zwierciadło, 2015
- Coraz mniej olśnień, Wydawnictwo Zwierciadło, 2015
- Lady M., Wydawnictwo Zwierciadło, 2016
- Alicja w krainie czasów. Czas zaklęty, Vol. 1, Wydawnictwo Zwierciadło, 2016
- Alicja w krainie czasów. Czas opowiedziany, Vol. 2, Wydawnictwo Zwierciadło, 2016
- Alicja w krainie czasów. Czas odzyskany, Vol. 3, Wydawnictwo Zwierciadło, 2017
- Ostatnia chowa klucz, Wydawnictwo Zwierciadło, 2017
- Kości proroka (The Prophet's Bones), Wydawnictwo Marginesy, 2018

== See also ==
- Polish literature
- List of Poles
