= Gala Čaki =

Serbian painter, art collector, and organizer

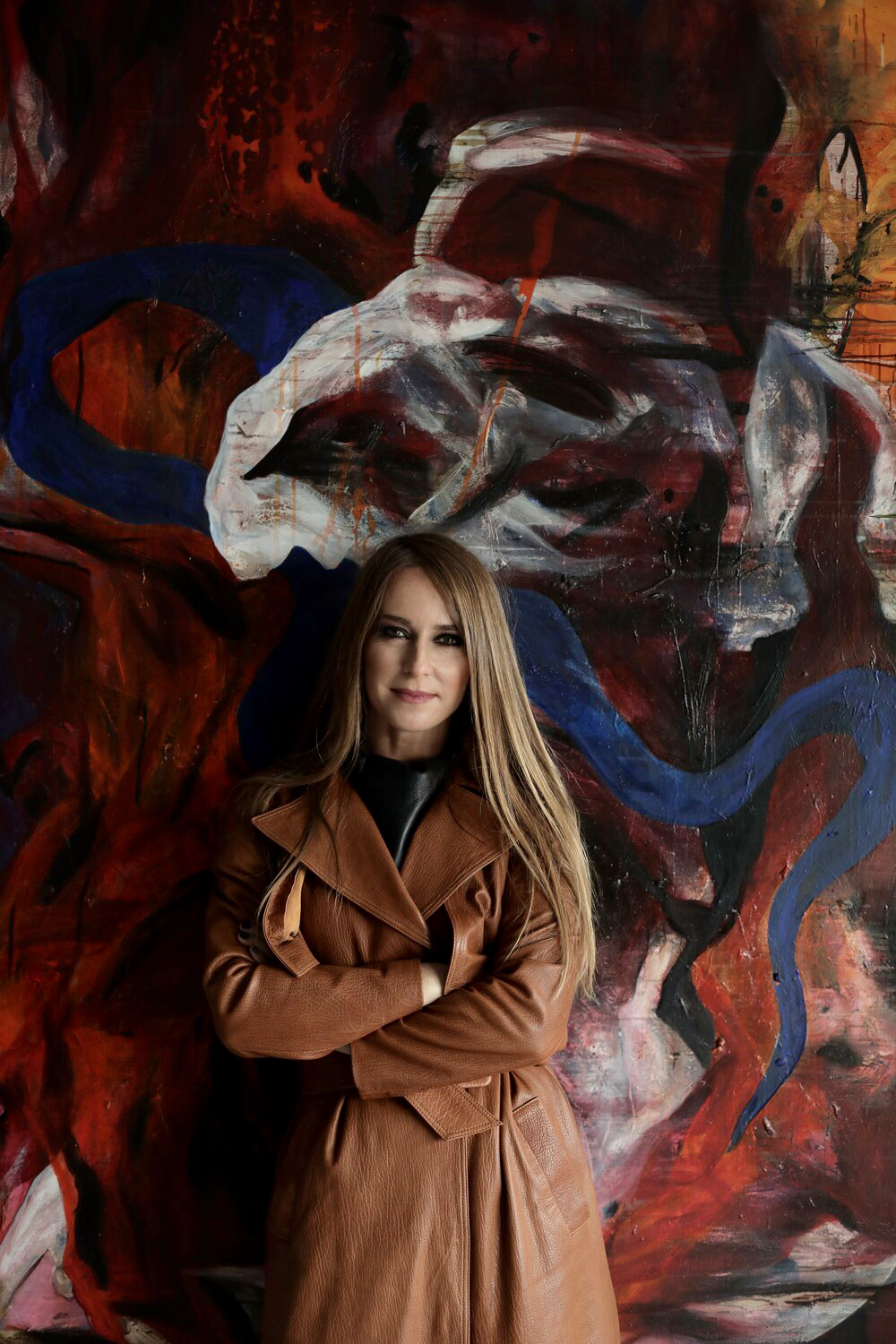
- Gala Čaki in her studio in 2020
- Born: March 19, 1987; Ečka, Serbia
- Education: University of Arts in Belgrade
- Occupation: Painter

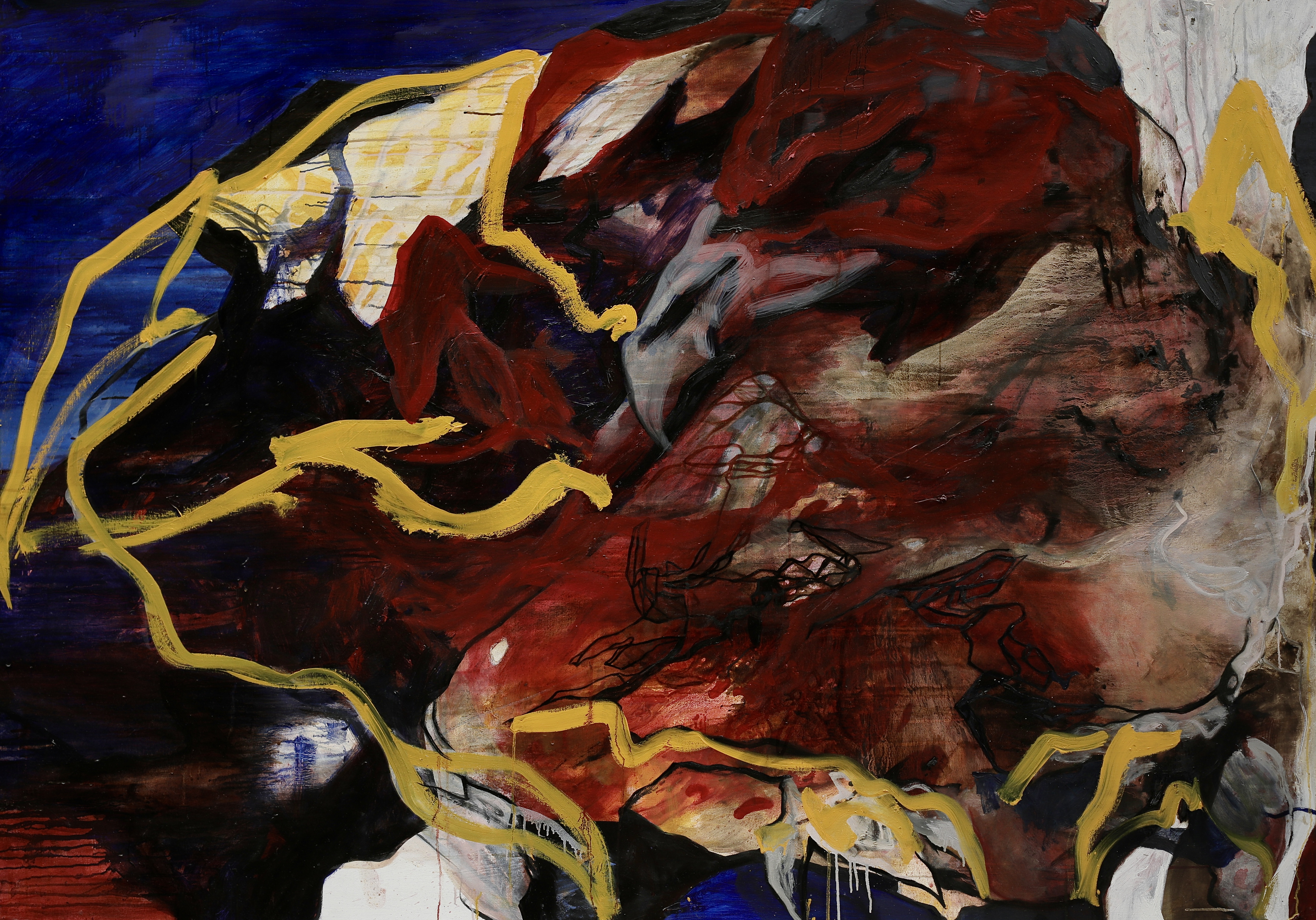
Grifon (Griffin), oil on canvas, 140 × 200 cm, 2020

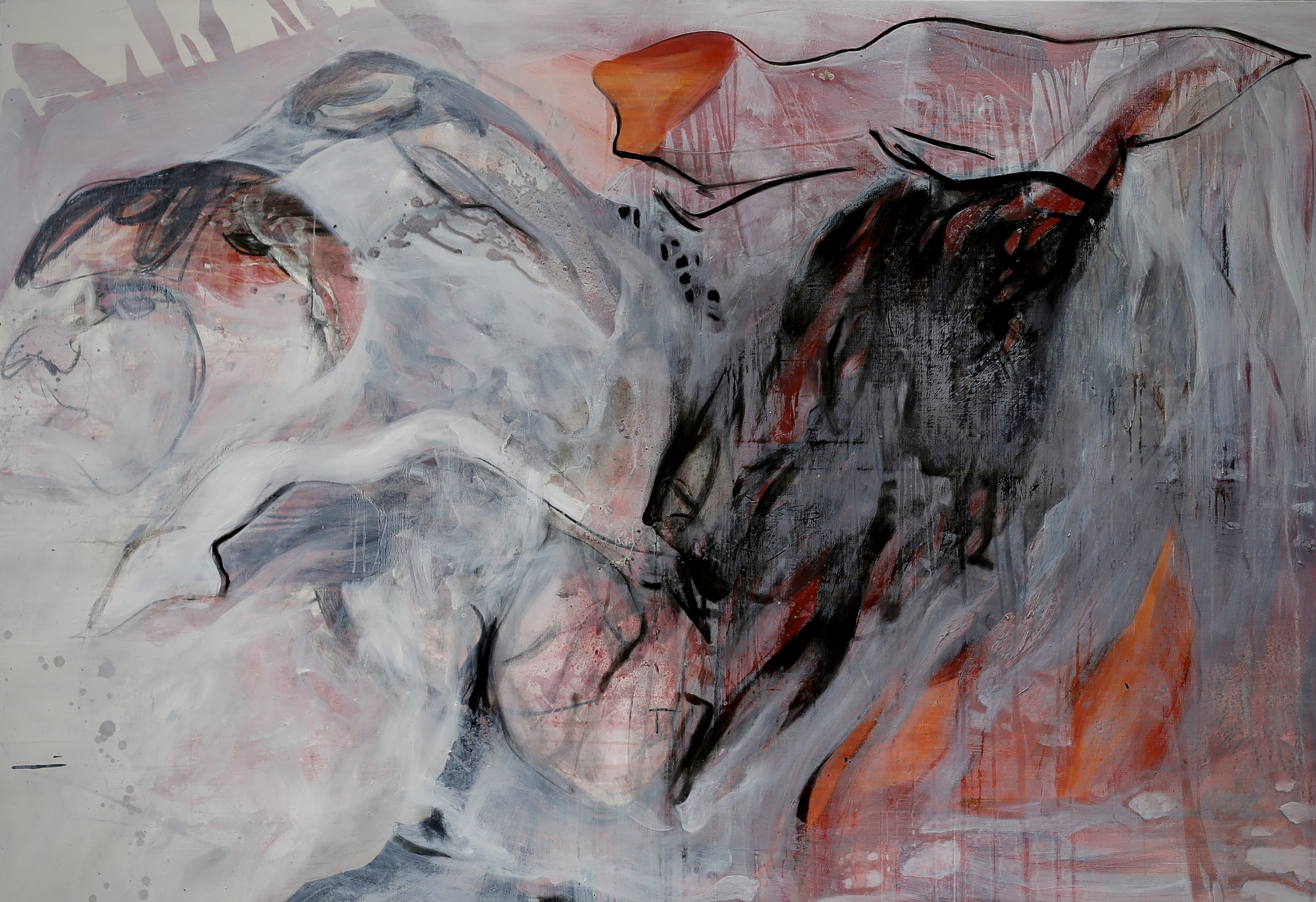
Noćno sunce (Night Sun), oil on canvas, 140 × 200 cm, 2020

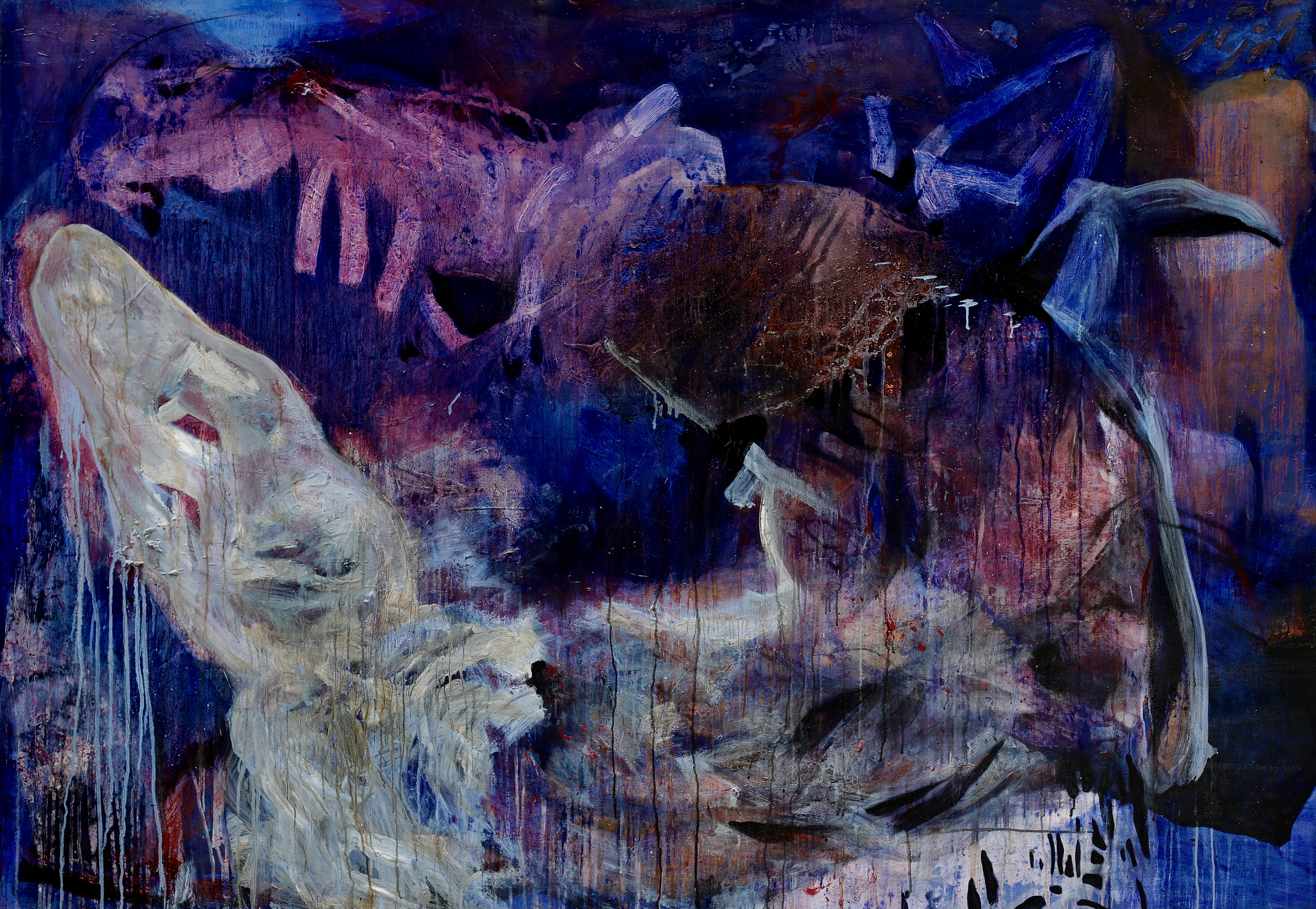
Sol (Sol), oil on canvas, 140 × 200 cm, 2020

Gala Čaki Serbian Cyrillic: Гала Чаки, Hungarian: Gala Csaky;(Ečka, Serbia, 1987) is a Serbian painter, art collector, and organizer of the Gala International Symposium of Art.

== Life and work ==
Gala was born on March 19, 1987, in Ečka, Serbia. She completed her primary and secondary education in Zrenjanin, Serbia. She enrolled at the Academy of Arts in Novi Sad in 2006, where she earned two Master Degrees in 2011, Painting and Drawing, going on to doctoral art studies at the Faculty of Fine Arts in Belgrade in 2013, graduating in 2017. Since 2014, she has been a member of the international organization Art Link Us, whose headquarters are in the city of Ehime, Japan. Gala's artistic research is focused on fantastic painting and ambient performance of works of art. She is the founder of the Gala International Symposium of Art in Serbia, which has hosted more than 30 eminent artists from around the world. Her works have been exhibited in China, Japan, Indonesia, Singapore, Russia, India, Qatar, Dubai, Denmark, Germany, France, Belgium, the Netherlands, Poland, Spain, Portugal, Italy, Romania, Hungary, Croatia, Slovenia, Montenegro, America, Canada, and Mexico.

== Scholarships and study ==
- Ruth Katzman Scholarship, New York City (2012)
- Raghurajpur International Art/Craft Exchange, Raghurajpur, India (2012)
- ArtEles creative center, Hämeenkyrö, Finland (2012)
- Scholarship of the Egyptian Ministry of Culture for the International Symposium of Painting, Luxor, Egypt (2014)
- Al Asmakh International Fellowship for Young Artists, Doha, Qatar (2015)
- Tropical LAB, International Camp for Doctoral Art Students, Singapore, Singapore (2016)
- Buccara Residential Program, Bad Honnef, Germany (2017)
- Elrefugio Residential Program, Tenerife, Spain (2017)
- Pullman Residential Program, Zhangjiajie, China (2017)

== Biennale ==
- 6th International Biennial of Art in Beijing, National Museum, Beijing, China (2015)
- 3rd European International Biennial of Art Books, Gallery of the National Contemporary Visual Arts Foundation, Bucharest, Romania (2015)

== Symposiums ==
- International Art Symposium, Sinji Vrh, SloveniaInternational Symposium of Ceramics, Medana, Slovenia (2014)
- International Art Symposium, Opatija, Croatia International Art Symposium, Cairo, Egypt (2014)
- 16th International Symposium of Paintings, Opatija, Croatia (2014)
- International Symposium of Paintings, Opatija, Croatia Al Asmakh International Art Symposium, Doha, Qatar (2015)
- International Art Symposium DIAS, Dubai, Dubai International Art Symposium, Tarsus, Turkey (2015)
- Tramotan International Symposium, Cres, Croatia (2015)
- Kendlimajor-Nagykanizsa International Symposium (Hungarian: Kendlimajor-Nagykanizsa), Hungary (2015)
- Trahens International Symposium, Zalošče, Slovenia (2015)
- International Art Symposium, Opatija, Croatia (2015)
- Kendlimajor-Nagykanizsa International Symposium (Hungarian: Kendlimajor-Nagykanizsa, Hungary (2016)
- International Symposium of Ceramics Arte in Situ, Casa Rosina, Vodnjan, Croatia (2017)
- International Symposium of Paintings, Hotel Miramar, Opatija, Croatia (2017)
- International Symposium In the Middle of the Month, Mexico City, Mexico (2018)
- The First Gala International Art Symposium in Novi Sad, Serbia (2018)
- The Second Gala International Art Symposium in Novi Sad, Serbia (2019)

== Projects ==
- Painting of the historical part of the city of Namur in the form of a mural, organization LEZBIEL (Fr. L’ASBL Lieux-Communs), Namur, Belgium (2013)
- E-gallery Art Project, Executive Group, Belgrade, Serbia (2014)
- International project Parchment Serbia, Belgrade, Serbia (2014)
- International project of children's drawings Art Link Us, Paper Festival, Shikoku Japan (2014)
- International project of children's drawings Art Link Us, Japanese traditional house, Kagawa, Japan (2014)
- Gala International Symposium of Arts, Novi Sad, Serbia (2018)
- International Project "Serbian Contemporary Painting," Cultural Center in Beijing, Beijing, China (2018)
- Gala International Symposium of Arts, Novi Sad, Serbia (2019)
- Serbian and Chinese Contemporary Art, Guan Shanyue Museum, Shenzhen, China (2020)
