= Halina Murias =

Polish politician (born 1955)

member of Sejm 2005-2007
- In office 25 September 2005 – 2007

Personal details
- Born: 1955 (age 70–71)
- Party: League of Polish Families

Halina Maria Murias (born 2 April 1955 in Łańcut) is a Polish politician. She was elected to the Sejm on 25 September 2005, getting 6062 votes in 23 Rzeszów district as a candidate from the League of Polish Families list.

She was also a member of Sejm 2001-2005.

== See also ==
- List of Sejm members (2005–2007)
