= Our Century =

- Based on: Stulecie Winnych by Ałbena Grabowska
- Country of origin: Poland
- Original language: Polish
- No. of seasons: 4
- No. of episodes: 52

Production
- Running time: 45 minutes

Original release
- Network: TVP1
- Release: 3 March 2019 – present

Stulecie Winnych is a Polish drama series. It tells about the multi-generational family of Winny, living in Brwinów near Warsaw, against the background of the history of the 20th century. The action of the series begins on the eve of the outbreak of World War I and is expected to end in 2014, in modern times. It was created on the basis of the book trilogy of the same title written by Ałbena Grabowska, originally published in 2014-2015. Aired from March 3, 2019 on TVP1.

== Series overview ==
Season	Episodes	Season premiere	Season finale	Viewers
1	1-13 (13)	March 3, 2019	May 26, 2019	2.63 mil
2	14-26 (13)	March 15, 2020	May 31, 2020	2.85 mil
3	27-39 (13)	March 7, 2021	May 16, 2021	2.81 mil
4	40-52 (13)	March 6, 2022	May 15, 2022	
5	53-65 (13)	2023	2023	

== Main cast ==
- Weronika Humaj (seasons 1-2) and Urszula Grabowska (seasons 3-4) as Ania Winna-Tarasiewicz
- Karolina Bacia (seasons 1-2) and Magdalena Walach (seasons 3-4) as Mania Winna-Bartosiewicz/Mania Winna-Borkowska
- Jan Wieczorkowski as Stanisław Winny (seasons 1-4)
- Kinga Preis as Bronisława Winna (seasons 1-2)
- Roman Garncarzyk as Antoni Winny (season 1, recurring season 2)
- Arkadiusz Janiczek as Władysław Winny (seasons 1-4)
- Katarzyna Kwiatkowska as Kazia Winna (seasons 1-3)
- Patryk Swichtenberg as Jan Winny (seasons 1-4)
- Tomasz Włosok as Paweł Bartosiewicz (seasons 1-2) and Jacek Beler (recurring season 3)
- Barbara Wypych as Andzia (seasons 1 and 3-4, recurring season 2)
- Lesław Żurek as Priest Ignacy Winny (seasons 2-4)
- Mateusz Janicki as Kazimierz Tarasiewicz (seasons 2-3)
- Stefan Pawłowski as Michał Śniegocki (seasons 2-4)
- Piotr Rogucki as Ryszard Borkowski (seasons 2-4)
- Weronika Humaj as Kasia Borkowska (seasons 3-4)
- Kamila Bujalska as Basia Borkowska-Klimkiewicz (seasons 3-4)
- Sonia Mietielica as Ewa Tarasiewicz-Gamelli (seasons 3-4)
- Marcin Franc as Michał Śniegocki Junior (seasons 3-4)
- Filip Gurłacz as Tomek Klimkiewicz (seasons 3-4)
- Bartłomiej Kotschedoff as Benito Gamelli (season 3)
- TBA as Ula Klimkiewicz (season 4)
- TBA as Jula Klimkiewicz (season 4)
- Krzysztof Cybulski as Antek Winny (season 4)
- Paweł Małaszyński as Janusz (season 4)
