= Galina Zhitnyuk =

Soviet-Moldovan politician (1925–2020)

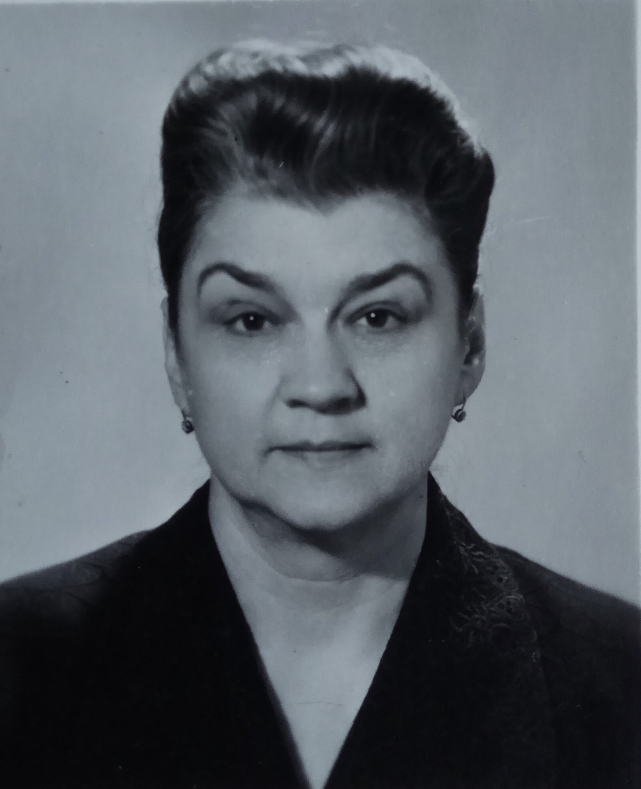
Galina Zhitnyuk

Galina Mikhailovna Zhitnyuk (Russian: Галина Михайловна Житнюк; January 30, 1925, Kiev Governorate – July 16, 2020, Chișinău) was a Soviet and Moldovan politician.

She served as Minister of Light Industry 1965–1987.

== Biography ==
She was born in 1925 in Pustovarovka village.

Higher education - graduated from the Moscow State Textile University.

From 1942 she worked as an accountant.

Since 1949 - in economic, social and political work.

In 1953 - 1962 - engineer at textile enterprises in Riga and Chișinău.

Since 1962, the director of the Chisinau knitting factory "Steaua Roshie".

Since 1965 Minister of Light Industry of the Moldavian SSR.

Honored Engineer of the Moldavian SSR.

Member of the Central Committee of the Communist Party of Moldova.

She was elected a deputy of the Supreme Soviet of the Moldavian SSR of the 6th-11th convocations.

Member of the CPSU since 1955. Delegate of the XXII Congress of the CPSU.

She died on July 16, 2020, in Chișinău.
