= Halina Mierzejewska =

Polish linguist

Halina Mierzejewska (1922 – November 14, 2003) was a professor of linguistics at the University of Warsaw, in the Institute of Polish Language.

Mierzejewska served as the honorary president of the Polish College of Logopedes. Her research focused on neurolinguistics, logopedics, and dyslexia.

== Works ==
- Mierzejewska, Halina (1982). Recherches Comparatives Sur La Desintegration Aphasique De Differents Systemes De La Langue (Realises Au Cours De Reeducation Des Aphasiques) (Comparative Studies on Aphasic Desintegration of different Systems of Language (Observations made during the Reeducation of Aphasics)) (in French).
- Emiluta-Rozya, Danuta; Halina Mierzejewska; Paulina Atys (1985). Badania przesiewowe do wykrywania zaburzeń rozwoju mowy u dzieci dwu-, cztero- i sześcioletnich (Selected tests aimed at revealing problems in language development among two-, four- and six-year-olds) (in Polish).

== See also ==
- List of Poles
