= Galina Kakovkina =

Russian painter

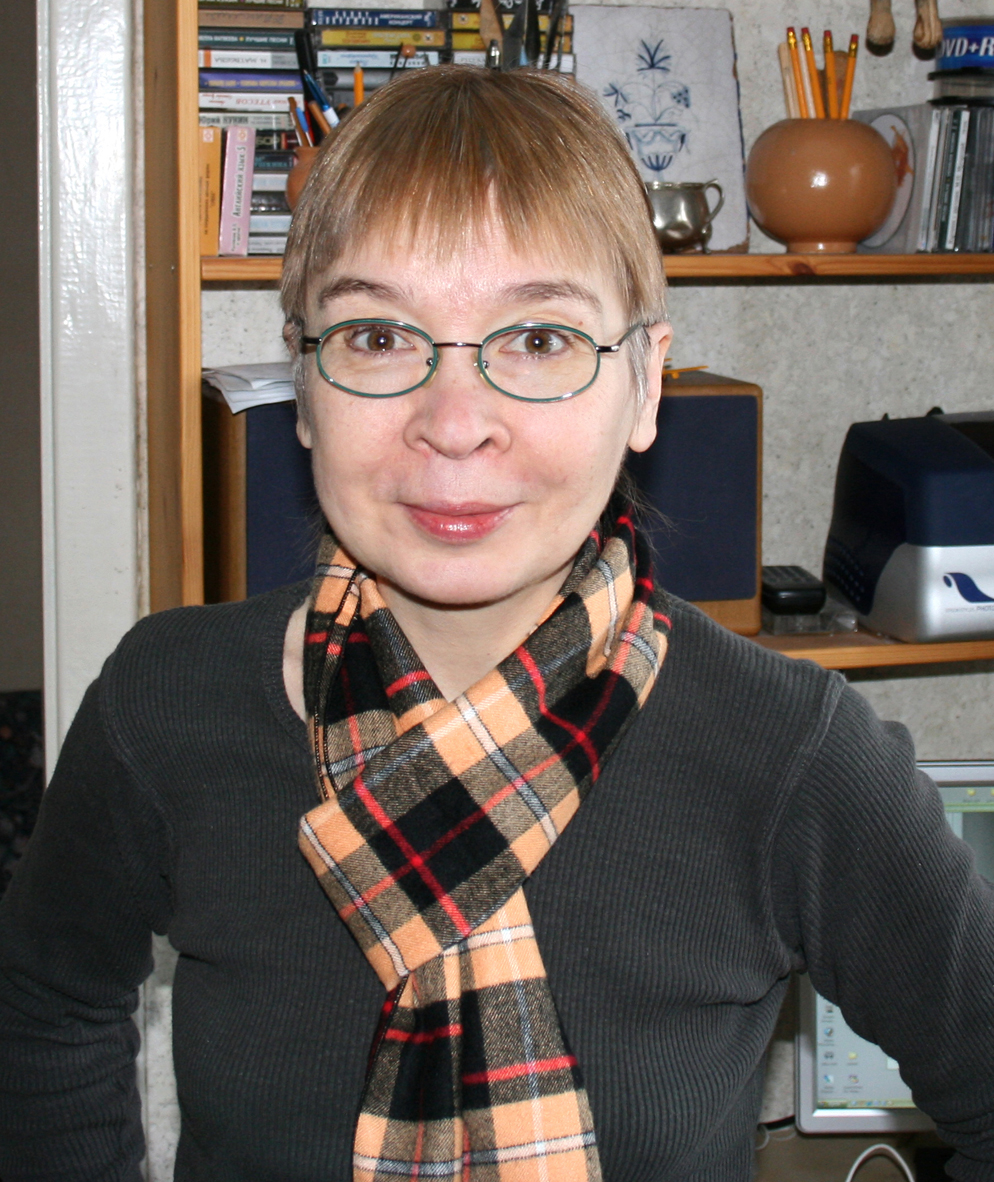
- Born: January 10, 1957; Gorky (Nizhny Novgorod), Russia
- Known for: Painting

Galina Kakovkina (Russian: Каковкина Галина Александровна; born January 10, 1957, in Gorky (Nizhniy Novgorod)) is a Russian artist, a painter, representative of the Nizhny Novgorod underground, and one of the founders of the creative association of artists Cherny Prud (Black Pond).

== Creative activity ==
Her creative biography began with regional exhibition in 1976. During the next several years she took part in many flat exhibitions of nonconformists.

In 1987, at an exhibition in Moscow at VDNKh All-Russian Exhibition Centre one of Galina's works gained a medal. Soon some paintings were purchased by The Vladimir-Suzdal state historical, architectural and art museum-reserve.

In 1987, Galina Kakovkina with friends established the creative association "Cherny Prud".

In 1990, Galina Kakovkina took part in big projects "Drugoe pokolenie" ("Other generation") and "Drugoe pokolenie-2" ("Other generation-2"), that gathered the best artists from the Volga region, whose creative work was out of the system of "socialistic realism". Authors of the project were Lubov Saprykina and Anna Gor (art directors of the "Caryatid" gallery, later of the Nizhny Novgorod branch of the State Centre for Contemporary Art). Exhibitions took place in Moscow (Central House of Artist), Nizhny Novgorod (Nizhny Novgorod State Art Museum).

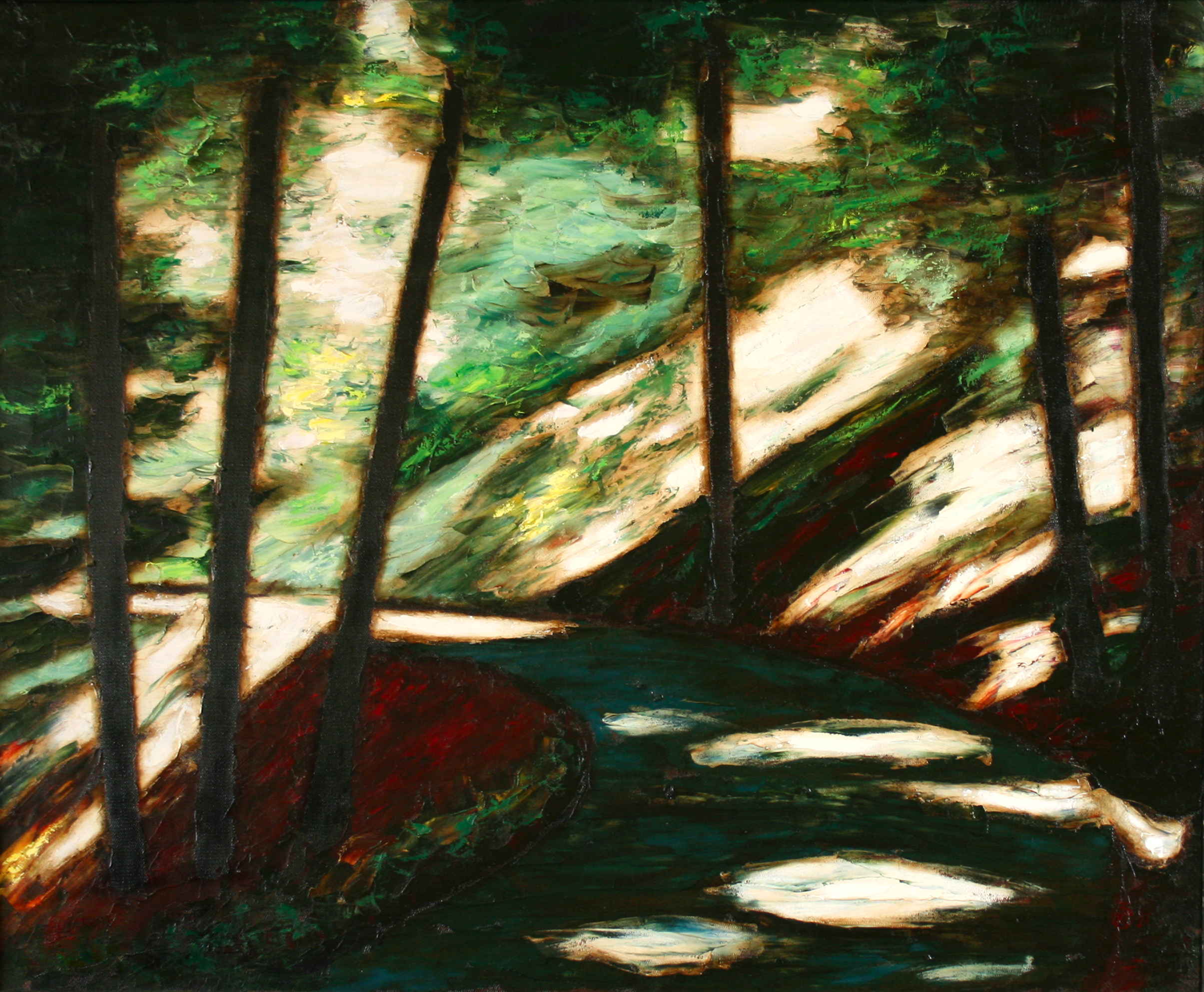
Galina Kakovkina, Light. Fragment #30, 1996

In 1995–96 Gallery "Caryatid" spends the series of Galina's personal exhibitions ("Walk in the Garden", "Between a Thing and Emptiness", "Time Name"), and also Galina Kakovkina and Liubov Saprykina together with the Nizhniy Novgorod TV create video project "Painting Interpretation".

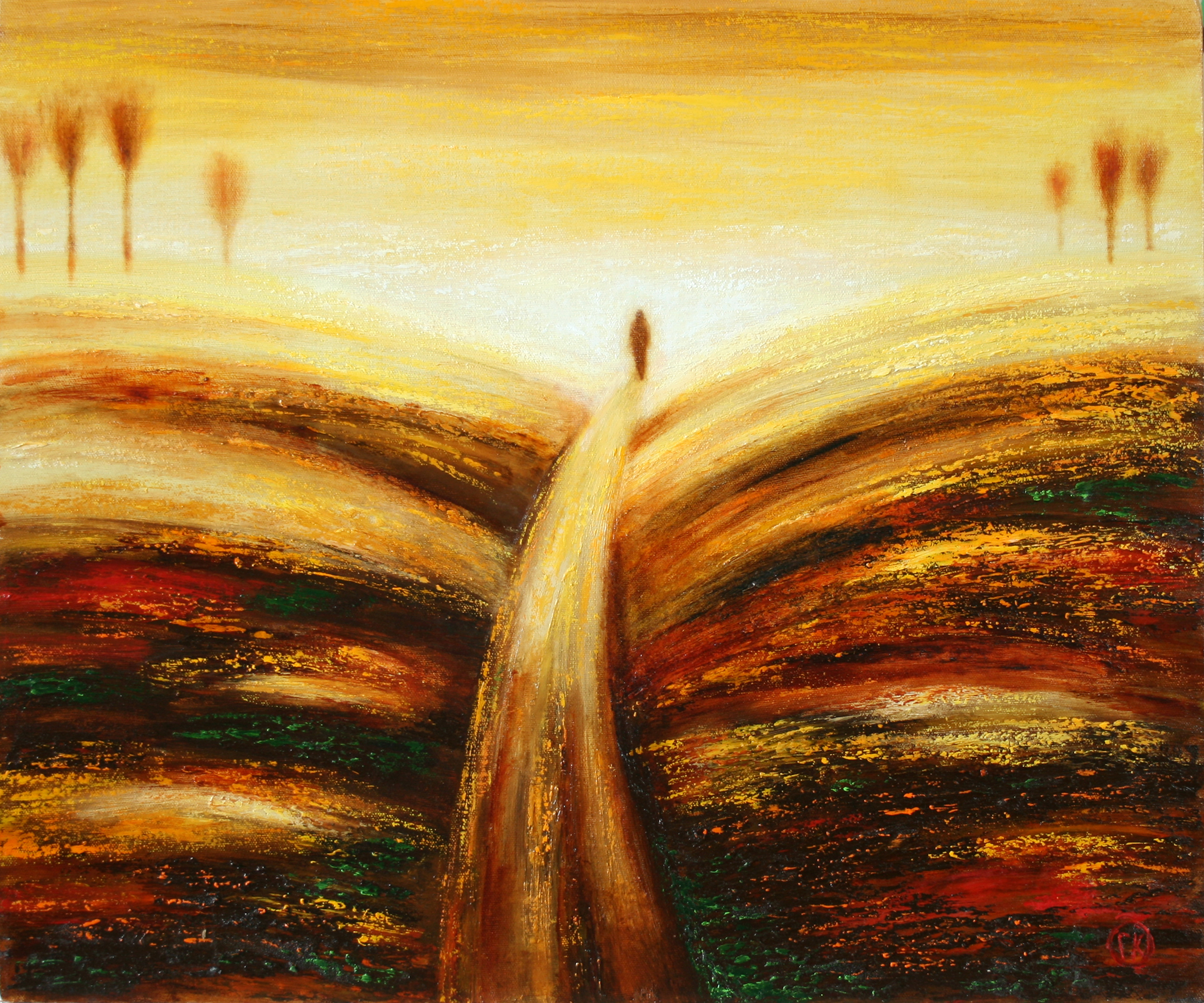
Galina Kakovkina, Road across the Hills, 2007

In 1998, Nizhny Novgorod Exhibition Center held Galina's personal exhibition "Light. Fragments", consisting of paintings in which she tries to identify light as the mystical category. On her canvases rendered in a very dark scale of colors, light is presented by rare and very bright patches – flashes of hope in the world of shades.

In 1999, Nizhny Novgorod State Art Museum presented an exhibition named "Composition with the Road", where Galina continued the theme of roads, initiated in “Walk in the Garden”. The theme of a way was the most full and deeply developed in "The Way Home" project (Nizhny Novgorod State Art Museum, 2008).

In 2010, Galina Kakovkina presented the exhibition project "Boat" after more than two years of intensive preliminary work. In this project the artist considered semantic components of such concepts as the Boat, Water, the Vessel. The boat as an image performs an archetype and generates variety of associations and hints. Therefore, the artist uses many of them for the fullest disclosing of a boat theme – as rescue means, as dwelling, as a vessel and as a ritually-ceremonial symbol of transition in other world. The project has been presented in Cosa in Se gallery, Nizhniy Novgorod.

== Cherny prud ==
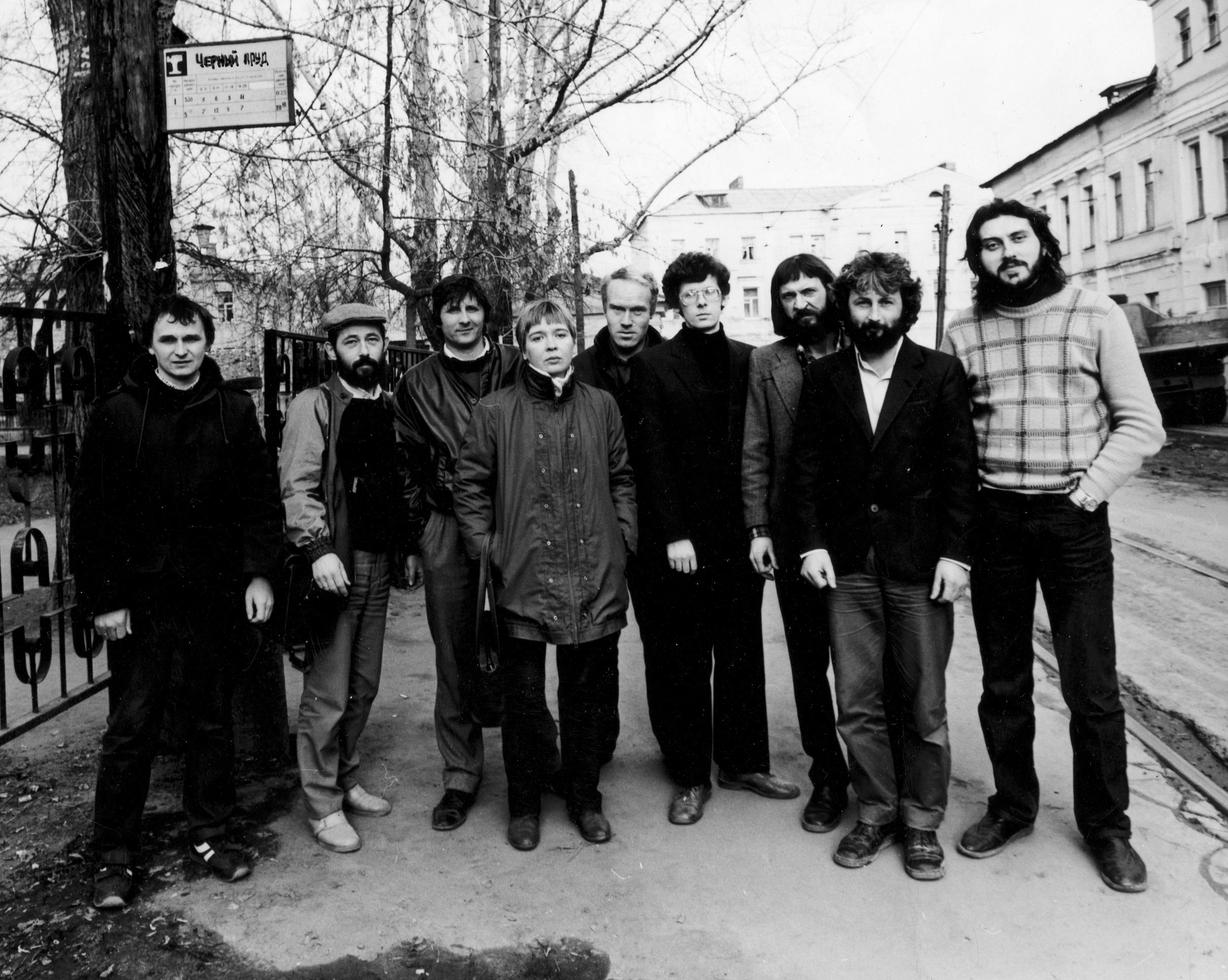
Cherny prud ( “Black Pond” Group)

“Cherny prud” (“Black Pond” Group) is a creative association, founded in 1987 by a group of artists, mostly representatives of the Nizhny Novgorod underground.

“Cherniy Prud” played a considerable role in a cultural life of the province and returned public interest to true, independent art. Members of the association held a lot of exhibitions in native city, in the Volga region and in Moscow.

The most complete collection of works by artists of the creative association “Cherny prud” is located in the Chuvash State Art Museum.

== Museum collections ==
Galina Kakovkina's works are in museum collections:

Nizhny Novgorod State Art Museum,

Chuvash state art museum (Cheboksary),

Republic Mary-L Fine Arts Museum (Yoshkar Ola),

State Museum and Exhibition Center ROSIZO (of the Ministry of Culture of the Russian Federation),

Museum of Landscape (Plyos),

The State Vladimir-Suzdal state historical, architectural and art museum-reserve,

Novocheboksarsk's Art Museum,

Ulyanovsk Regional Art Museum,

The Mordovia Republican Museum of Fine Arts (Saransk), etc.
