= Halina Szwarc =

Armia Krajowa member

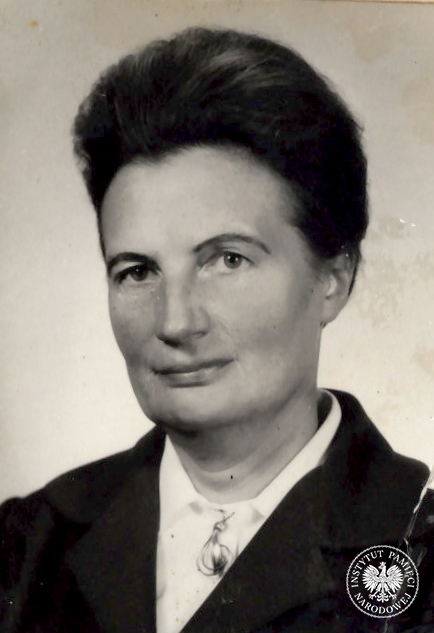
Halina Szwarc (1975)

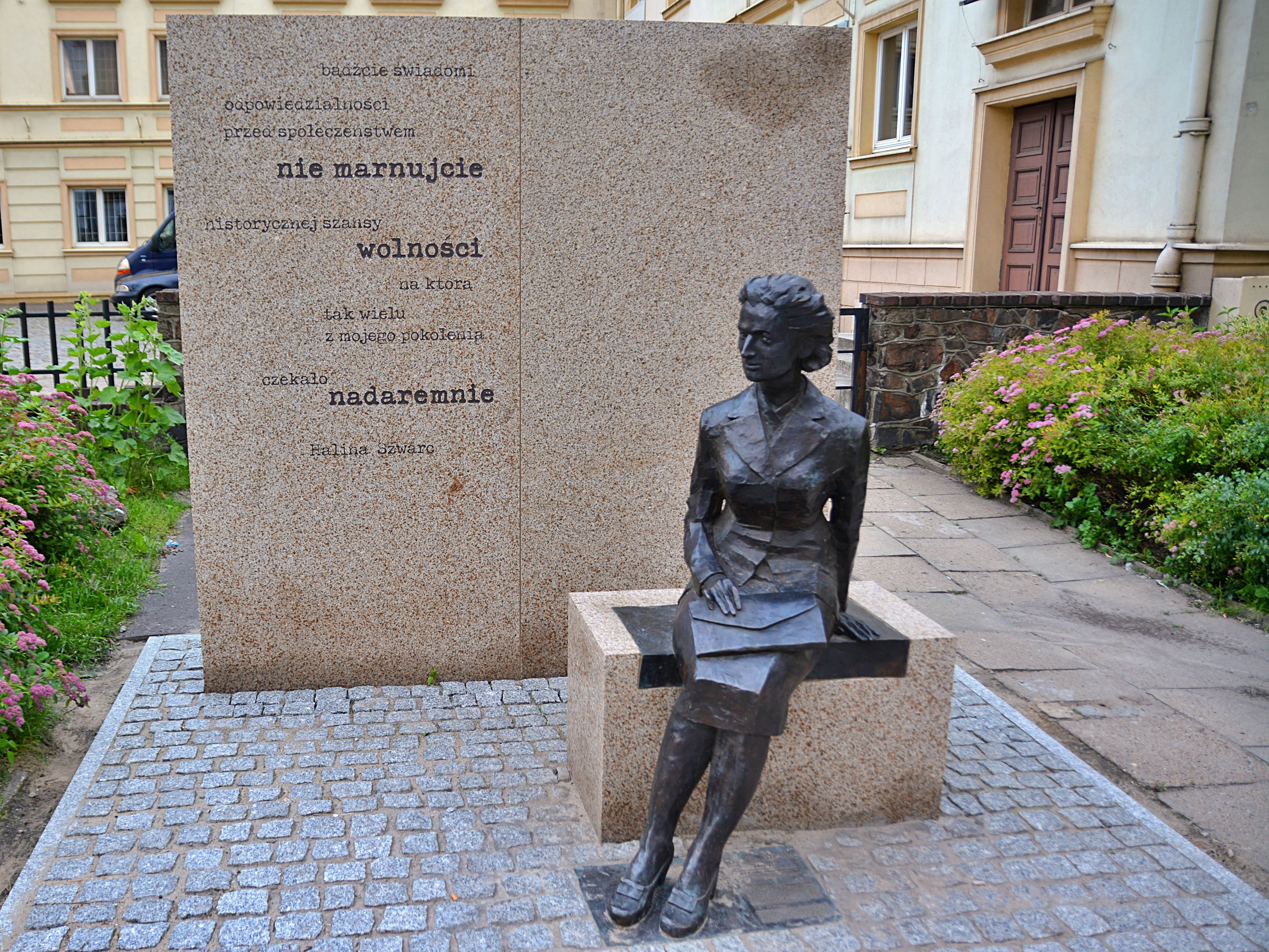
Halina Szwarc monument in Łódź

Halina Szwarc de domo Kłąb (1923–2002) - was a member of the Polish resistance during the Second World War, working undercover first under the pseudonym Ryszard, then Jacek II. Postwar, she became a professor of medicine in gerontology, and in 1970/1971, the prorector of the Józef Piłsudski University of Physical Education in Warsaw.

After the outbreak of war, at the age of 16, she joined the Związek Walki Zbronej (ZWZ), the resistance organization that eventually became the Polish Home Army. Under order, she signed the Volksliste, basing her claim to Volksdeutsche status on a German grandmother. She was allowed to finish her schooling in a German language school and in 1940, travelled west into the heart of the Third Reich, ostensibly to further her education. She would, in fact, be spying for the ZWZ. She conducted operations in Vienna, Berlin, Munich, and other major German cities. Szwarc's greatest contribution to the war effect was her surveying of military installations in Hamburg, making possible their destruction by Allied bombers. Later, she took a job in the Berlin Archive of Army Medicine, where she was able to collect invaluable information concerning German troop positions on the Eastern Front.

In 1944, following her return to her home town of Łodź, she was arrested by the Gestapo. She was tortured and condemned to death by firing squad, but the sentence was not carried out.

After the war, she finished her medical studies and began to work in the clinic of the Poznan University of Medical Sciences. Like other members of the Home Army, Szwarc was viewed as a possible traitor by the new Communist regime. Despite continual persecution by the security service and other forms of repression in Stalinist Poland, she managed to advance her academic career. In 2000, she was honored with the Order of Polonia Restituta for her achievements in the medical field.

== Publications ==
- Rekreacja i turystyka ludzi w starszym wieku - Halina Szwarc, Teresa Wolańska, Tadeusz Łobożewicz, Instytut Wydawniczy Związków Zawodowych, Warszawa 1988, ISBN 83-202-0700-2
- Rekreacja ruchowa osób starszych : praca zbiorowa / pod red. Teresy Wolańskiej; [aut.] H. Szwarc, R. Wasilewska, T. Wolańska, Wydawnictwo Akademii Wychowania Fizycznego, Warszawa 1986
- Rekreacja ruchowa osób starszych : praca zbiorowa / H. Szwarc, R. Wasilewska, T. Wolańska; pod red. Teresy Wolańskiej, Wydawnictwo Akademii Wychowania Fizycznego, Warszawa 1979
- Wspomnienia z pracy w wywiadzie antyhitlerowskim ZWZ-AK, "Neriton", Warszawa 1999, ISBN 83-86842-46-6
