= Alja Rachmanowa =

Russian author and child psychologist

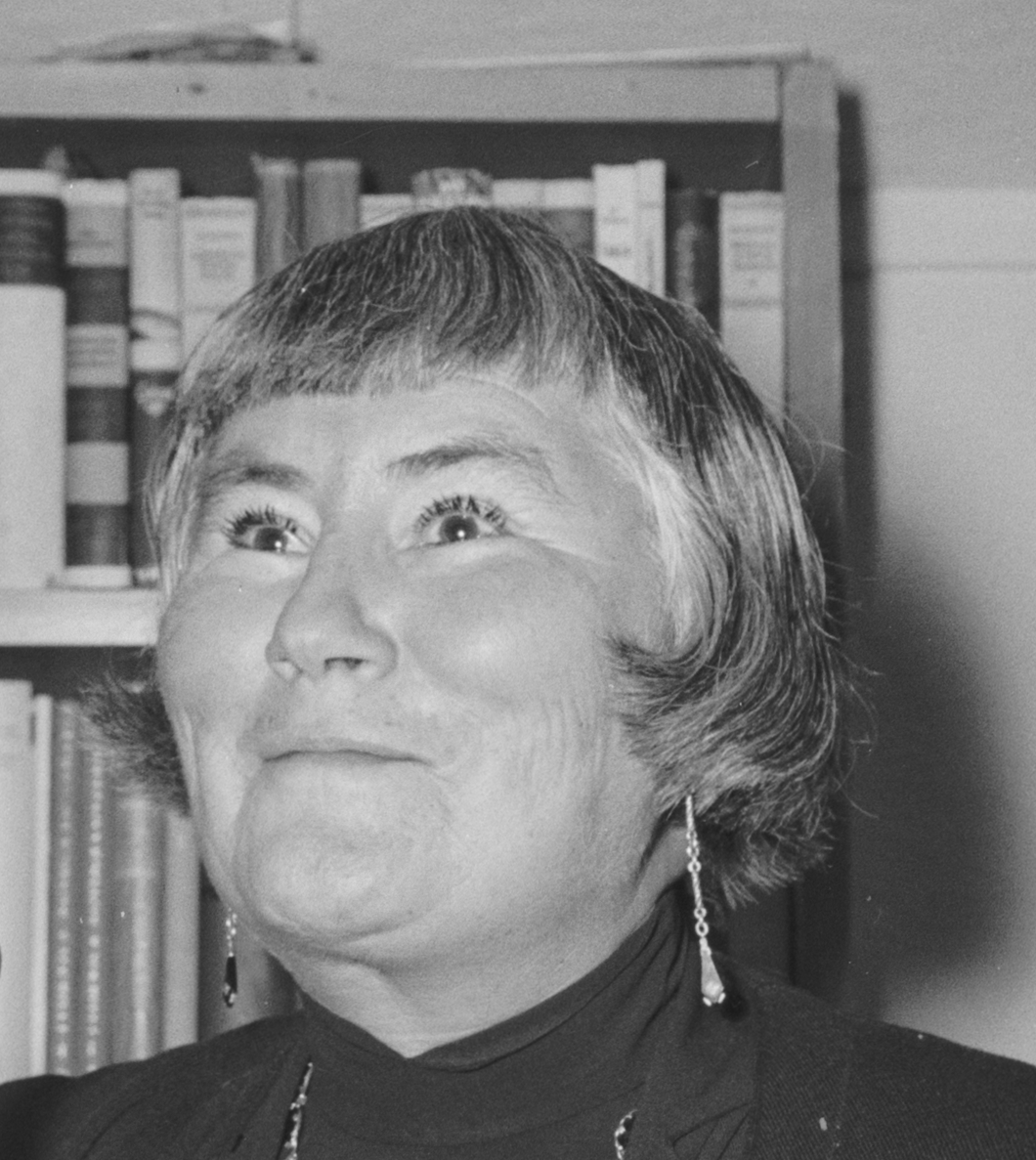
Alja Rachmanowa, ca. 1965

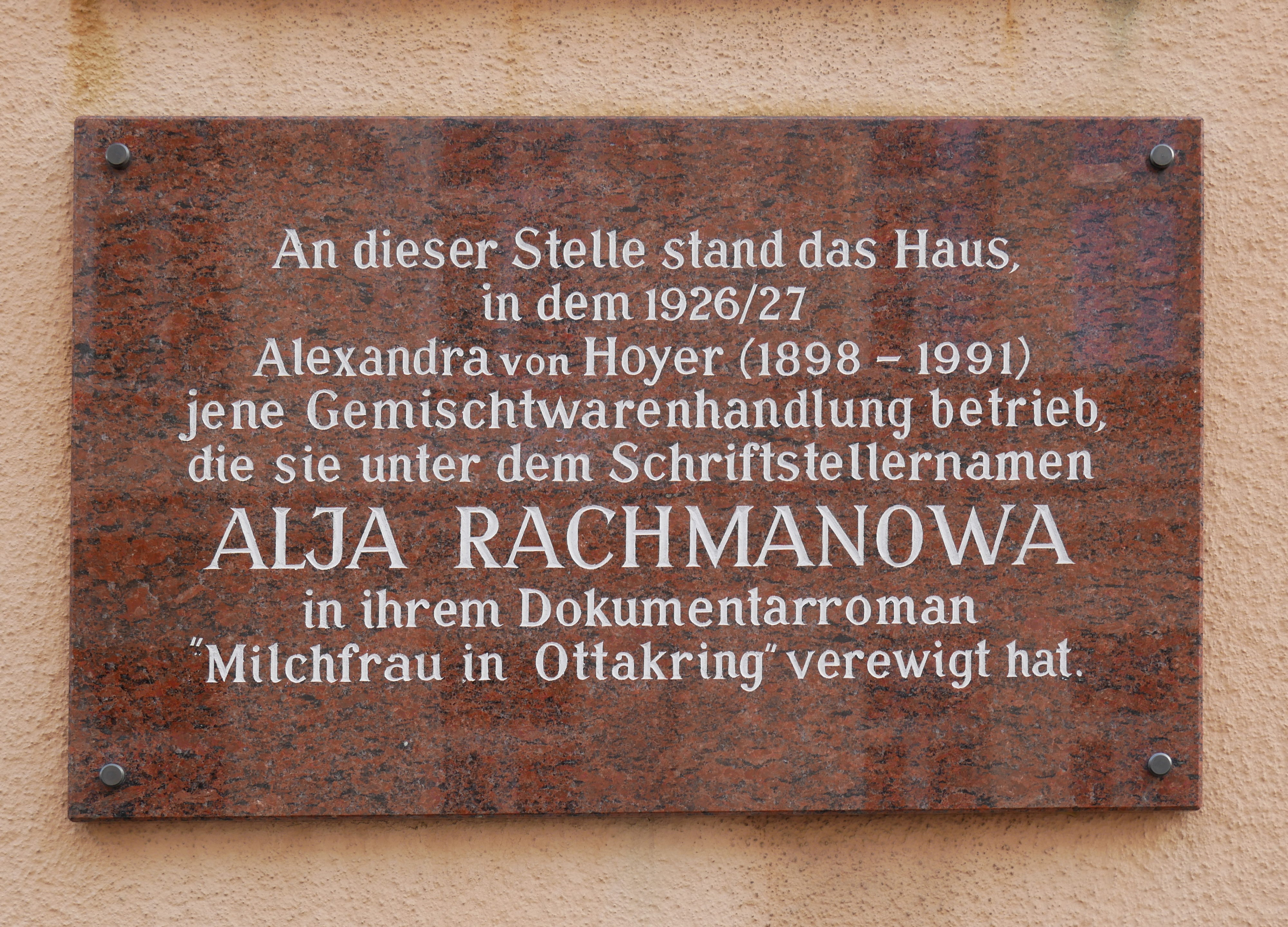
Commemorative plaque in Vienna

Alja Rachmanowa is the pen name of Galina Nikolaevna Dyuragina (Russian: Галина Николаевна Дюрягина, 15 June 1898 – 11 February 1991), also known as Alexandra von Hoyer, a Russian author and child psychologist. She is known for her diaries which describe her childhood, studies and marriage under the Russian revolution, and life as a refugee in Vienna. As most of her work was first published in German, translated by her husband Arnulf von Hoyer from her Russian manuscripts, she chose a German spelling for her pen name.

== Biography ==
Galina was the oldest daughter of a physician in the town of Kasli near Yekaterinburg. Since her family was part of the aristocracy of Russia prior to the revolution, they suffered much in the years after 1917. Eventually Galina and her Austrian husband Arnulf von Hoyer were forced to flee to western Europe. Her diaries describing life in Russia under communism were translated into many languages. She lived in Austria from 1925 to 1945 but her works were banned under the Nazi regime. She died in the Swiss town of Ettenhausen, where she had lived since 1948.

Alja Rachmanowa's literary works were all first published in German and created in close cooperation with her husband who translated them into German in the process of writing. Rachmanowa typed her Russian manuscripts in a Latin transcription, as she didn't own a typewriter featuring Cyrillic letters. According to Heinrich Riggenbach, author of the index of her literary estate, Rachmanowa's Nachlass exists as a symbiosis of her literary work and the translations of her husband.

== Publications ==
- Die Fabrik des neuen Menschen (A. Pustet, Salzburg-Leipzig 1935). Concluding that the "new people's factories" have proved utterly unproductive.
