= Halina Harelava =

Belarusian composer

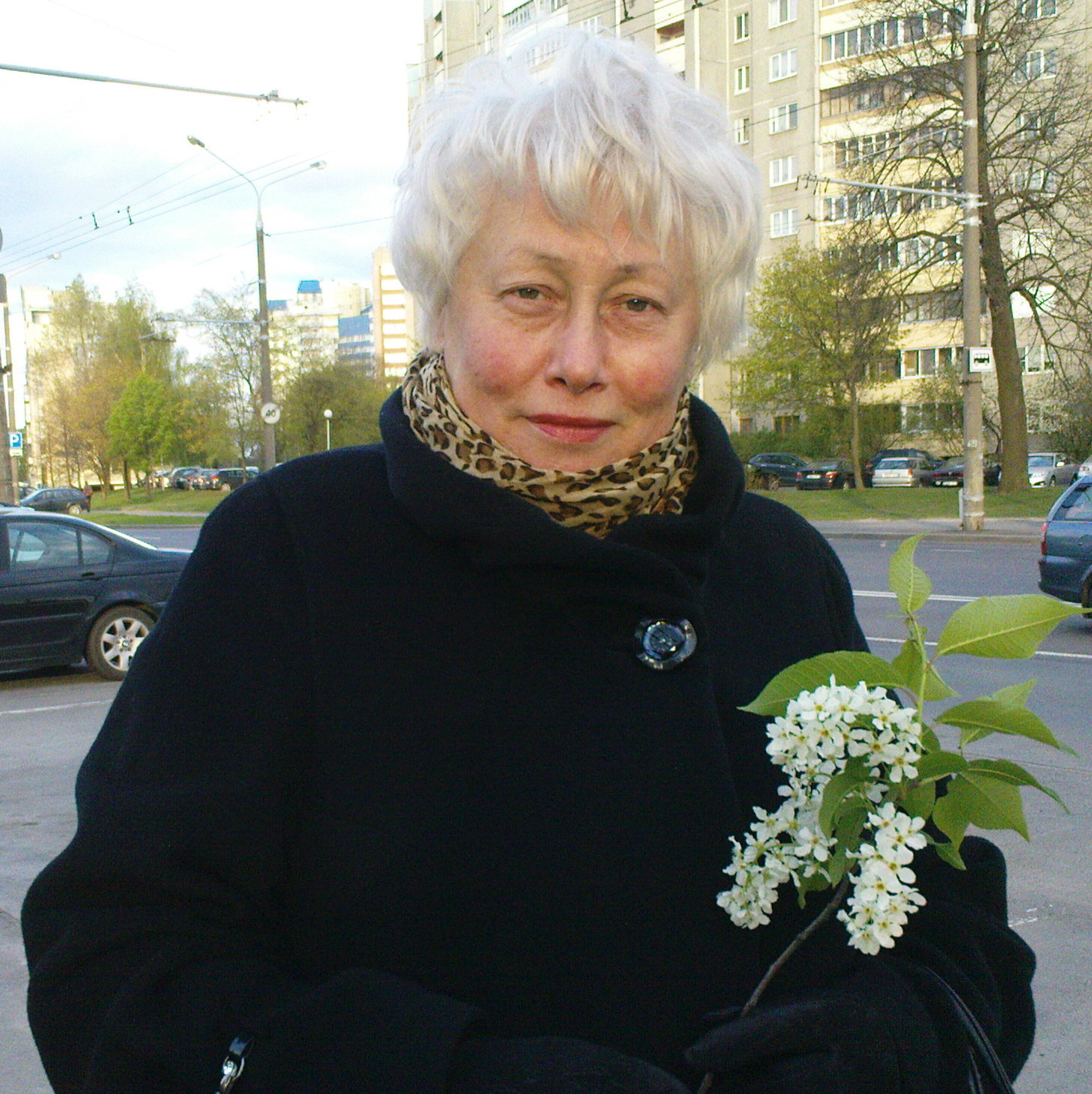
Halina Harełava

Halina Kanstancinaŭna Harełava, also known as Galina Gorelova (Belarusian: Галіна Гарэлава; Russian: Галина Горелова; born 5 March 1951), is a Belarusian contemporary composer.

== Biography ==
Harełava was born in Minsk, Byelorussian SSR (now Belarus), and studied music at the National Conservatory in Minsk with Dźmitry Smolski, graduating in 1977. After completing her studies, she took at position teaching theory and composition at the Conservatory. She received the State Prize of Belarus in 1992 for Anno mundis ardentis.

== Works ==
Harelava's works incorporate elements of Belarusian folk themes, and she is noted for children's compositions. Selected works include:

- Liryčnaja kantata [Lyrical Cantata] (traditional Belarusian texts) for female chorus and orchestra, 1979
- Anno mundis ardentis (P. Antokol'sky, G. Appolinaire, L. Aragon, V. Bryusov, S. Kirsanov, A. Rimbault, A. Tarkovsky) for mezzo-soprano, baritone and orchestra, 1989
- Tysiača hadoŭ nadzieji [A Thousand Years of Hope] (poets of the 10th–20th centuries) for female voice and orchestra, 1990
- Violin Concerto, 1979
- Oboe Concerto, 1984
- Bandaroŭna, symphonic poem, 1986
- Balalaika Concerto, 1991
- Trumpet Concerto, 1992
- Guitar Concerto, 1994
- Concerto for viola, string orchestra and bells, 2000
- Piejzažy [Landscapes], symphonic poem
- Alošyn kutok [Alyosha’s Corner], symphonic poem
- Ballade for cello and piano, 1987
- Sonata for violin and piano, 1987
- Lehienda for trombone and piano, 1990
- Sonata Al fresco for double bass and piano, 1995
- Sonata for piano, 1996
- Sonata for clarinet, 1996
- Al Sereno, Concert Fantasy for viola and piano, 1998
- Eine kleine Nachtmusik for viola and piano, 2001
- Lucia perpetuo moto for viola and piano, 2001
- Introduction and Fantasy on a Ragtime Theme for viola and piano, 2003
- Dziavočyja pieśni [Girls’ Songs] song cycle (M. Bogdanovich), 1979
- Sumnyja pieśni [Sad Songs] song cycle (A. Akhmatova), 1980
- Chvała biadniakam [In Praise of the Poor] song cycle (P. Béranger), 1991
