= Battle of Monte Cassino =

Battle of World War II

- Part of the Italian campaign of World War II
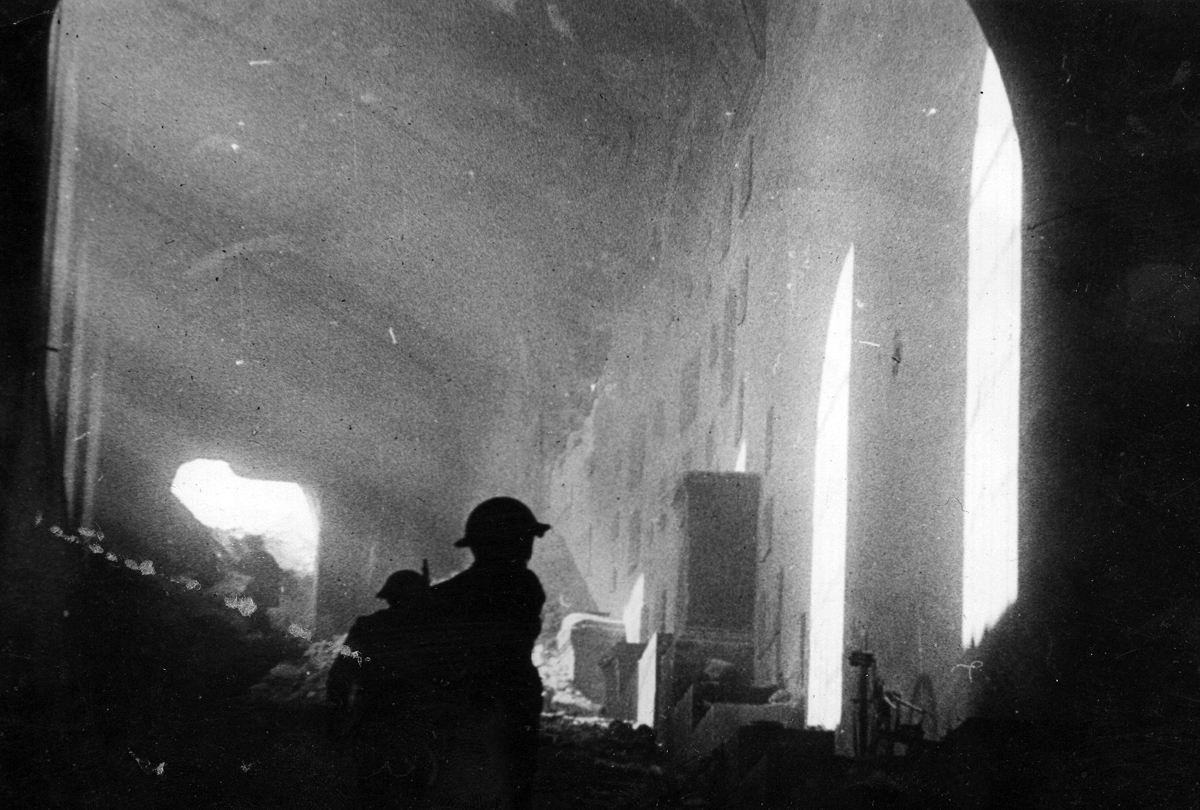
- Polish soldiers inside the ruined Monte Cassino monastery
Date	17 January – 18 May 1944 (4 months and 1 day)
Location	Monte Cassino, Kingdom of Italy 41°29′N 13°49′E
Result	Allied victory
Territorial changes	Monastery destroyed

Belligerents
United Kingdom • India • Newfoundland; United States; Free France; Poland; Canada; New Zealand; South Africa; Italy	Germany

Commanders and leaders
(United Kingdom) Harold Alexander (United Kingdom) Oliver Leese (United States) Mark Clark	(Nazi Germany) Albert Kesselring (Nazi Germany) H. Vietinghoff (Nazi Germany) F. S. Etterlin (Nazi Germany) Eberhard von Mackensen

Units involved
(United States) 5th Army (United Kingdom) 8th Army	(Nazi Germany) 10th Army

Strength
240,000 men 1,900 tanks 4,000 planes	140,000 men

Casualties and losses
55,000 – 105,000 casualties	~20,000 – 80,000 casualties (at least): (see Casualties section)
- 2,000 civilian deaths
- Monte Cassino, Italy

The Battle of Monte Cassino, also known as the Battle for Rome, was a series of four military assaults by the Allies against Axis forces in Italy during the Italian Campaign of World War II. The objective was to break through the Winter Line and facilitate an advance towards Rome.

In the beginning of 1944, the western half of the Winter Line was anchored by German forces holding the Rapido-Gari, Liri, and Garigliano valleys and several surrounding peaks and ridges. Together, these features formed the Gustav Line. Monte Cassino, a historic hilltop abbey founded in 529 by Benedict of Nursia, dominated the nearby town of Cassino and the entrances to the Liri and Rapido valleys. Lying in a protected historic zone, it had been left unoccupied by the Germans, although they manned some positions set into the slopes below the abbey's walls.

Repeated artillery attacks on assaulting allied troops caused their leaders to incorrectly conclude that the abbey was being used by the Germans as an observation post, at the very least. Fears escalated, along with casualties, and despite evidence, it was marked for destruction. On 15 February 1944, Allied bombers dropped 1,400 tonnes of high explosives, causing widespread damage. Fallschirmjäger forces occupied the area and established defensive positions amid the ruins.

Between 17 January and 18 May, Monte Cassino and the Gustav Line defences were attacked on four occasions by Allied troops. On 16 May, soldiers from the Polish II Corps launched one of the final assaults on the German defensive position as part of a twenty-division assault along a thirty-two-kilometre front. During the final phase of the Battle of Monte Cassino, the first flag raised over the ruins of the Monte Cassino monastery on the 18th of May 1944, at 10.20am was the Polish flag. It was followed by the British flag shortly after. Following this Allied victory, the German Senger Line collapsed on 25 May, and the German defenders were driven from their positions. The final capture of Monte Cassino resulted in over 43,000 Allied casualties, with German losses estimated at around 51,000 killed and wounded. Total Allied casualties for the Cassino campaign, including the Battle for Anzio and the capture of Rome, were over 105,000, while Axis casualties were at least 80,000. The battle has been described as a Pyrrhic victory.

== Background ==
The Allied landings in Italy in September 1943 by two Allied armies, following shortly after the Allied landings in Sicily in July, commanded by General Sir Harold Alexander, the Commander-in-Chief (C-in-C) of the 15th Army Group (later retitled the Allied Armies in Italy), were followed by an advance northward on two fronts, one on each side of the central mountain range forming the "spine" of Italy. On the western front, the American Fifth Army, commanded by Lieutenant General Mark W. Clark, which had suffered many casualties during the main landing at Salerno (codenamed Operation Avalanche) in September, moved from the main base of Naples up the Italian "boot", and on the eastern front, the British Eighth Army, commanded by General Sir Bernard Montgomery, advanced up the Adriatic coast.

Hitler directed Kesselring to hold as much land in Italy as he could, for as long as possible. Kesselring's subordinates preferred withdrawal, but nevertheless prepared defensive positions across the width of Italy, south of Rome.

The progress of Clark's Fifth Army was hindered by challenging terrain, adverse weather conditions, and well-prepared German defences. The Germans were fighting from a series of prepared positions in a manner designed to inflict maximum damage, then pulling back while buying time for the construction of the Winter Line defensive positions south of the Italian capital of Rome. The original estimates that Rome would fall by October 1943 proved far too optimistic.

Although in the east the German defensive line had been breached on the Adriatic front and Ortona was captured by the 1st Canadian Division, the advance had ground to a halt with the onset of winter blizzards at the end of December, making close air support and movement in the jagged terrain impossible. The route to Rome from the east using Route 5 was thus excluded as a viable option, leaving the routes from Naples to Rome, Highways 6 and 7, as the only possibilities; Highway 7 (the old Roman Appian Way) followed along the west coast but south of Rome ran into the Pontine Marshes, which the Germans had flooded.

Highway 6 (the Via Casilina) ran through the Liri valley, dominated at its south entrance by the rugged mass of Monte Cassino above the town of Cassino. Excellent observation from the peaks of several hills allowed the German defenders to detect Allied movement and direct highly accurate artillery fire, preventing any northward advance. Running across the Allied line was the fast-flowing Rapido River, which rose in the central Apennine Mountains, flowed through Cassino (joining the Gari River, which was erroneously identified as the Rapido) and across the entrance to the Liri valley. There, the Liri River joined the Gari to form the Garigliano River, which continued on to the sea.

With its heavily fortified mountain defences, difficult river crossings, and valley heads flooded by the Germans, Cassino formed a linchpin of the Gustav Line, the most formidable line of the defensive positions making up the Winter Line.

In spite of its potential excellence as an observation post, because of the fourteen-century-old Benedictine abbey's historical significance, the German commander in Italy, Generalfeldmarschall Albert Kesselring, ordered German units not to include it in their defensive positions and informed the Vatican and the Allies accordingly in December 1943.

Nevertheless, some Allied reconnaissance aircraft maintained they observed German troops inside the monastery. While this remains unconfirmed, it is clear that once the monastery was destroyed, it was occupied by the Germans and proved better cover for their emplacements and troops than an intact structure would have offered.

== First battle ==
=== Plans and preparation ===
First Battle: plan of attack

The plan of the Fifth Army commander, Lieutenant General Clark, was for the British X Corps, under Lieutenant General Richard McCreery, on the left of a thirty-kilometre (20 mi) front, to attack on 17 January 1944, across the Garigliano near the coast (5th and 56th Infantry Divisions). The British 46th Infantry Division was to attack on the night of 19 January across the Garigliano below its junction with the Liri in support of the main attack by U.S. II Corps, under Major General Geoffrey Keyes, on their right. The main central thrust by the U.S. II Corps would commence on 20 January with the U.S. 36th Infantry Division making an assault across the swollen Gari river five miles (8.0 km) downstream of Cassino. Simultaneously, the French Expeditionary Corps (CEF) led by General Alphonse Juin would continue its "right hook" move towards Monte Cairo, the hinge to the Gustav and Hitler defensive lines. In truth, Clark did not believe there was much chance of an early breakthrough, but he felt that the attacks would draw German reserves away from the Rome area in time for the attack on Anzio (codenamed Operation Shingle) where the U.S. VI Corps (British 1st and U.S. 3rd Infantry Divisions, the 504th Parachute Regimental Combat Team, U.S. Army Rangers and British Commandos, Combat Command 'B' of the U.S. 1st Armored Division, along with supporting units), under Major General John P. Lucas, was due to make an amphibious landing on 22 January. It was hoped that the Anzio landing, with the benefit of surprise and a rapid move inland to the Alban Hills, which command both routes 6 and 7, would so threaten the Gustav defenders' rear and supply lines that it might just unsettle the German commanders and cause them to withdraw from the Gustav Line to positions north of Rome. Whilst this would have been consistent with the German tactics of the previous three months, Allied intelligence had not understood that the strategy of fighting retreat had been for the sole purpose of providing time to prepare the Gustav line where the Germans intended to stand firm. The intelligence assessment of Allied prospects was therefore over-optimistic.

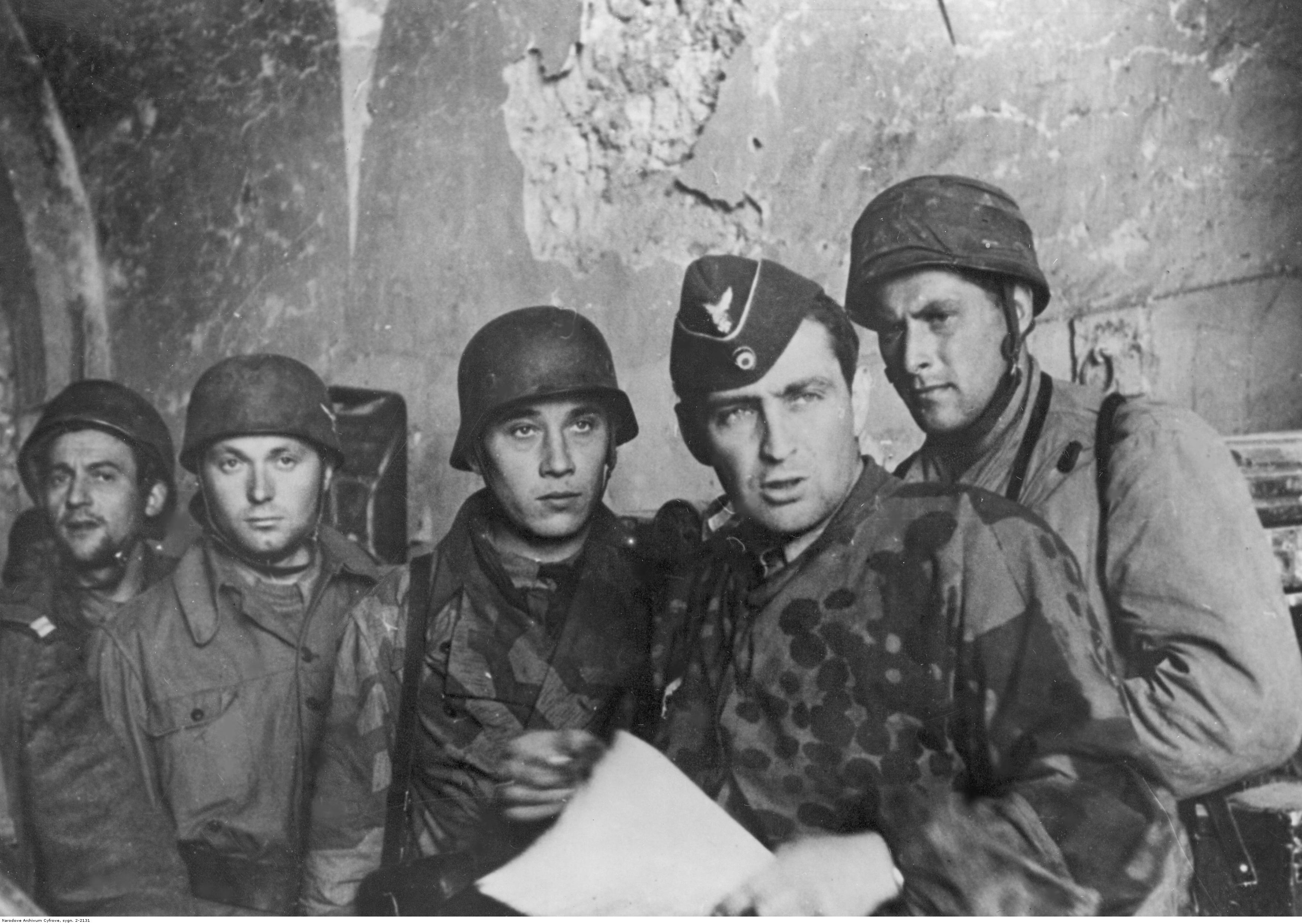
German paratroopers from the 3rd FJR "Green Devils" taking part in the battles for Monte Cassino, March 1944

The Fifth Army had only reached the Gustav Line on 15 January, having taken six weeks of heavy fighting to advance the last seven miles (11 km) through the Bernhardt Line positions, during which time they had sustained 16,000 casualties. They hardly had time to prepare the new assault, let alone take the rest and reorganisation they really needed after three months of attritional fighting north from Naples. However, because the Allied Combined Chiefs of Staff would only make landing craft available until early February, as they were required for Operation Overlord, the Allied invasion of Northern France, Operation Shingle had to take place in late January with the coordinated attack on the Gustav Line some three days earlier.

=== First assault: X Corps on the left, 17 January ===
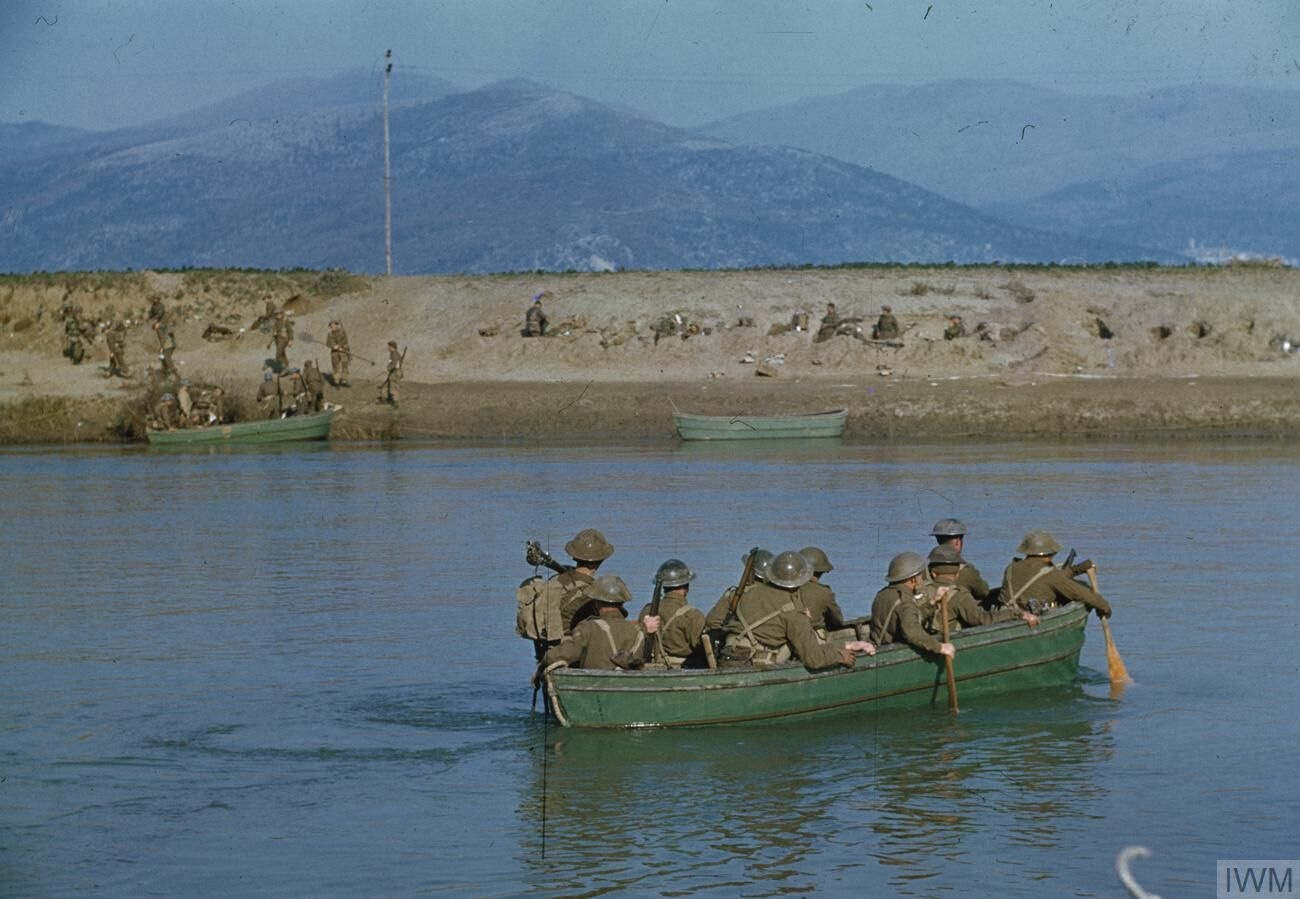
British Royal Engineers of the 46th Infantry Division cross the Garigliano river, 19 January 1944

The first assault was made on 17 January. Near the coast, the British X Corps (56th and 5th Divisions) forced a crossing of the Garigliano (followed some two days later by the British 46th Division on their right) causing General Fridolin von Senger und Etterlin, commander of the German XIV Panzer Corps, and responsible for the Gustav defences on the south western half of the line, some serious concern as to the ability of the German 94th Infantry Division to hold the line. Responding to Senger's concerns, Kesselring ordered the 29th and 90th Panzergrenadier Divisions from the Rome area to provide reinforcement. X Corps did not have the extra men, and the battle plan remained unchanged. However, there would certainly have been time to alter the overall battle plan and cancel or modify the central attack by the U.S. II Corps to make men available to force the issue in the south before the German reinforcements were able to get into position. As it happened, Fifth Army HQ failed to appreciate the frailty of the German position and the plan was unchanged. The two divisions from Rome arrived by 21 January and stabilised the German position in the south. In one respect, however, the plan was working in that Kesselring's reserves had been drawn south. The three divisions of Lieutenant General McCreery's X Corps sustained some 4,000 casualties during the period of the first battle.

=== Main attack: II Corps in the centre, 20 January ===
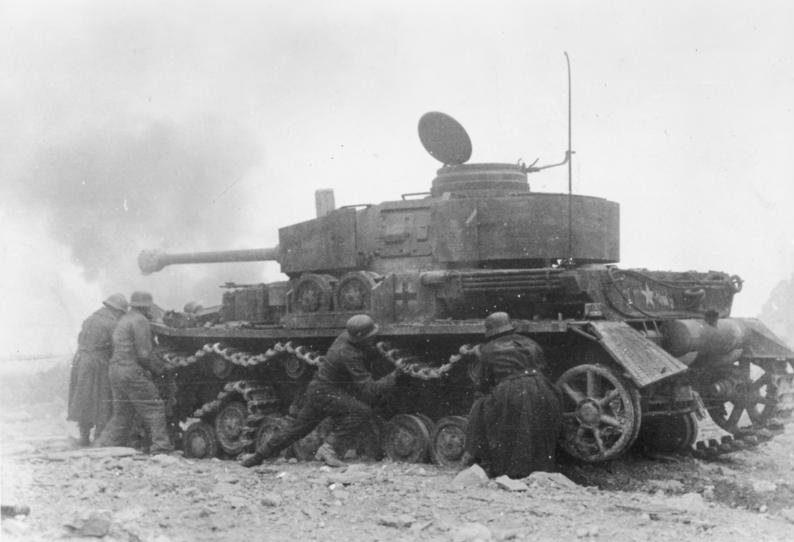
A German tank crew attempts to restore their Panzer IV's mobility after battle damage inflicted during the fighting

The central thrust by the U.S. 36th Division, under Major General Fred L. Walker, commenced three hours after sunset on 20 January. The lack of time to prepare meant that the approach to the river was still hazardous due to uncleared mines and booby traps, and the highly technical business of an opposed river crossing lacked the necessary planning and rehearsal. Although a battalion of the 143rd Infantry Regiment was able to get across the Gari on the south side of San Angelo and two companies of the 141st Infantry Regiment on the north side, they were isolated for most of the time and at no time was Allied armour able to get across the river, leaving them highly vulnerable to counter-attacking tanks and self-propelled guns of Generalleutnant Eberhard Rodt's 15th Panzergrenadier Division. The southern group was forced back across the river by mid-morning of 21 January. Keyes pressed Walker to renew the attack immediately. Once again, the two regiments attacked but with no more success against the well dug-in 15th Panzergrenadier Division: the 143rd Infantry Regiment got the equivalent of two battalions across, but, once again, there was no armoured support, and they were devastated when daylight came the next day. The 141st Infantry Regiment also crossed in two battalion strength and, despite the lack of armoured support, managed to advance 1 kilometre (0.62 mi). However, with the coming of daylight, they too were cut down and by the evening of 22 January, the 141st Infantry Regiment had virtually ceased to exist; only 40 men made it back to the Allied lines.

Rick Atkinson described the intense German resistance:

Artillery and Nebelwerfer drumfire methodically searched both bridgeheads, while machine guns opened on every sound ... GIs inched forward, feeling for trip wires and listening to German gun crews reload ... to stand or even to kneel was to die ... On average, soldiers wounded on the Rapido received "definitive treatment" nine hours and forty-one minutes after they were hit, a medical study later found ..."

The assault had been a costly failure, with the 36th Division losing 2,100 men killed, wounded and missing in 48 hours. As a result, the army's conduct of this battle became the subject of a Congressional inquiry after the war.

=== II Corps try north of Cassino: 24 January ===
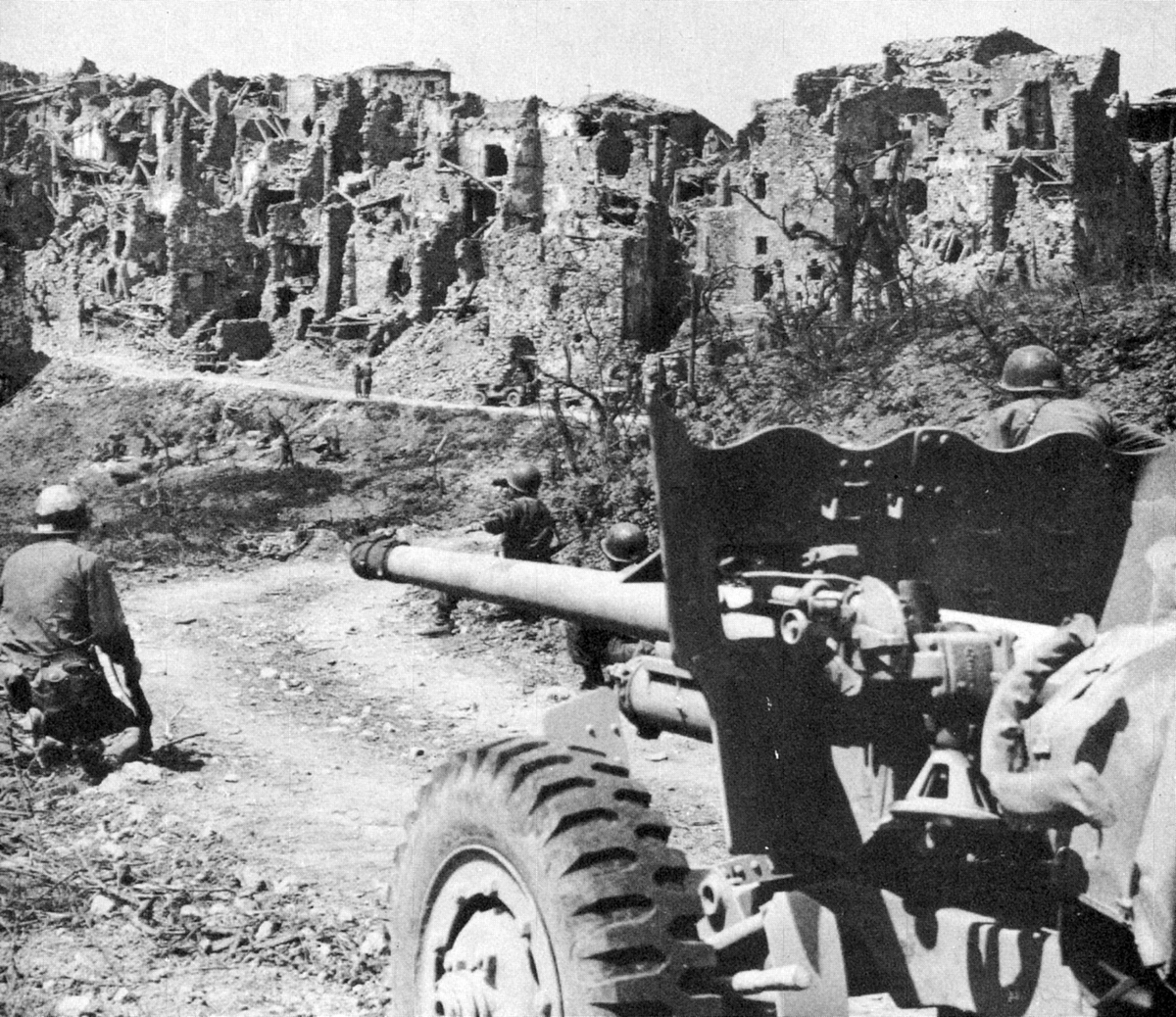
US soldiers with a 57mm M-1 anti-tank gun fighting near Monte Cassino during the initial assault

The next attack was launched on 24 January. The U.S. II Corps, with 34th Infantry Division under Major General Charles W. Ryder spearheading the attack and French colonial troops on its right flank, launched an assault across the flooded Rapido valley north of Cassino and into the mountains behind with the intention of then wheeling to the left and attacking Monte Cassino from high ground. Whilst the task of crossing the river would be easier in that the Rapido upstream of Cassino was fordable, the flooding made movement on the approaches each side very difficult. In particular, armour could only move on paths laid with steel matting and it took eight days of bloody fighting across the waterlogged ground for 34th Division to push back General Franek's German 44th Infantry Division to establish a foothold in the mountains.

=== French Corps halted on the right flank ===
On the right, the Moroccan-French troops made strategical initial progress against the German 5th Mountain Division, commanded by General Julius Ringel, gaining positions on the slopes of their key objective, Monte Cifalco. Forward units of the 3rd Algerian Infantry Division had also by-passed Monte Cifalco to capture Monte Belvedere and Colle Abate. General Juin was convinced that Cassino could be bypassed and the German defences unhinged by this northerly route but his request for reserves to maintain the momentum of his advance was refused and the one available reserve regiment (from 36th Division) was sent to reinforce 34th Division. By 31 January the French had ground to a halt with Monte Cifalco, which had a clear view of the French and U.S. flanks and supply lines, still in German hands. The two Moroccan-French divisions sustained 2,500 casualties in their struggles around Colle Belvedere.

=== II Corps in the mountains north of Cassino ===
First Battle: Northern Sector 24 January – 11 February 1944

It became the task of the U.S. 34th Division (joined temporarily by the 142nd Infantry Regiment of the 36th Division, which had been held in reserve and unused during the Rapido crossing) to fight southward along the linked hilltops towards the intersecting ridge on the south end of which was Monastery Hill. They could then break through down into the Liri valley behind the Gustav Line defences. It was very tough going: the mountains were rocky, strewn with boulders and cut by ravines and gullies. Digging foxholes on the rocky ground was out of the question and each feature was exposed to fire from surrounding high points. The ravines were no better since the gorse growing there, far from giving cover, had been sown with mines, booby-traps and hidden barbed wire by the defenders. The Germans had had three months to prepare their defensive positions using dynamite and to stockpile ammunition and stores. There was no natural shelter, and the weather was wet and freezing cold.

By early February, American infantry had captured a strategic point near the hamlet of San Onofrio, less than 1 mile (1.6 km) from the abbey and by 7 February a battalion had reached Point 445, a round-topped hill immediately below the monastery and no more than 400 yards (370 m) away. An American squad managed a reconnaissance right up against the cliff-like abbey walls, with the monks observing German and American patrols exchanging fire. However, attempts to take Monte Cassino were broken by overwhelming machine gun fire from the slopes below the monastery. Despite their fierce fighting, the 34th Division never managed to take the final redoubts on Hill 593 (known to the Germans as Calvary Mount), held by the 3rd Battalion of the 2nd Parachute Regiment, part of the 1st Parachute Division, the dominating point of the ridge to the monastery.

=== Aftermath ===
On 11 February, after a final unsuccessful 3-day assault on Monastery Hill and Cassino town, the Americans were withdrawn. U.S. II Corps, after two and a half weeks of battle, was worn out. The performance of the 34th Division in the mountains is considered to rank as one of the finest feats of arms carried out by any soldiers during the war. In return they sustained losses of about 80 per cent in the Infantry battalions, some 2,200 casualties.

At the height of the battle in the first days of February von Senger und Etterlin had moved the 90th Division from the Garigliano front to the north of Cassino and had been so alarmed at the rate of attrition, he had "mustered all the weight of my authority to request that the Battle of Cassino should be broken off and that we should occupy a quite new line. ... a position, in fact, north of the Anzio bridgehead". Kesselring refused the request. At the crucial moment von Senger was able to throw in the 71st Infantry Division whilst leaving the 15th Panzergrenadier Division (whom they had been due to relieve) in place.

During the battle, there had been occasions when with more astute use of reserves, promising positions might have been turned into decisive moves. Some historians suggest this failure to capitalise on initial success could be put down to Clark's lack of experience. However, it is more likely that he just had too much to do, being responsible for both the Cassino and Anzio offensives. This view is supported by the inability of Major General Lucian Truscott, commanding the U.S. 3rd Infantry Division, as related below, to get hold of him for discussions at a vital juncture of the Anzio breakout at the time of the fourth Cassino battle. Whilst General Alexander, C-in-C of the AAI, chose (for perfectly logical co-ordination arguments) to have Cassino and Anzio under a single army commander and splitting the Gustav Line front between the U.S. Fifth Army and the British Eighth Army, now commanded by Lieutenant General Sir Oliver Leese, Kesselring chose to create a separate 14th Army under General Eberhard von Mackensen to fight at Anzio whilst leaving the Gustav Line in the sole hands of General Heinrich von Vietinghoff's 10th Army.

The withdrawn American units were replaced by the newly formed New Zealand Corps (2nd New Zealand and 4th Indian Divisions), commanded by Lieutenant General Sir Bernard Freyberg, from the Eighth Army on the Adriatic front.

== Second battle (Operation Avenger) ==
Second battle: plan of attack

=== Background ===
Freyberg, with U.S. VI Corps under heavy threat at Anzio, was under equal pressure to launch a relieving action at Cassino. Once again, therefore, the battle began without the attackers being fully prepared. Furthermore, Corps HQ did not fully appreciate the difficulty in getting the 4th Indian Infantry Division into place in the mountains and supplying them on the ridges and valleys north of Cassino. This was evidenced in the writings of Maj. Gen. Howard Kippenberger, commander of New Zealand's 2nd Division, after the war:

Poor Dimoline (acting commander of 4th Indian Division) was having a dreadful time getting his division into position. I never really appreciated the difficulties until I went over the ground after the war.

— Kippenberger

Freyberg's plan was a continuation of the first battle: an attack from the north along the mountain ridges and an attack from the southeast along the railway line, and to capture the railway station across the Rapido less than 1 mile (1.6 km) south of Cassino town. Success would squeeze out Cassino town and open up the Liri valley. Freyberg had informed his superiors that he estimated that the offensive had a 50 percent chance of success, given the circumstances.

=== Destruction of the abbey ===
Allied officers increasingly focused on the abbey of Monte Cassino, which was believed to be used as a German artillery observation point. The abbey was presumed to have prevented the breach of the 'Gustav Line'.

The British press and C. L. Sulzberger of The New York Times wrote about German observation posts and artillery positions inside the abbey, but their claims were not substantiated. The commander in chief of the Mediterranean Allied Air Forces, Lieutenant General Ira C. Eaker, accompanied by Lieutenant General Jacob L. Devers (deputy to General Sir Henry Maitland Wilson, the Supreme Allied Commander of the Mediterranean Theater), personally observed during a fly-over "a radio mast ... German uniforms hanging on a clothesline in the abbey courtyard; [and] machine gun emplacements 50 yards (46 m) from the abbey walls." (Note: There is an inconsistency between the description of this event by historian Albert Simpson in the Official History of the Army Air Force published in 1951 and that described in Hapgood & Richardson (based on a taped interview with Eaker by co-author D. W. Richardson). The Official History says the flight took place in a Piper Cub at a height of "less than 200 feet" while the later publication states the flight took place in an L-5 Sentinel at an altitude of between 1,200 and 1,500 feet and that the generals' flight was escorted by three fighter-bombers flying 1,000 feet (300 m) above them. The confusion between the J-3 and L-5 is easy to understand since they are very similar aircraft. It is possible that the difference in height is explained by the one being a height above the abbey and the other a height above the valley floor.) U.S. II Corps commander Geoffrey Keyes flew over the monastery several times and reported to Fifth Army G-2 that he had not seen evidence of German troops in the abbey. When informed of others' claims of having seen enemy troops there, he stated, "They've been looking so long they're seeing things." US Army Artillery Pilot Spotter Hughes Rudd saw German positions at the Abbey.

Kippenberger of the New Zealand Corps HQ believed that the monastery was probably being used as the Germans' main vantage point for artillery spotting because of its strategic location, but there was no clear evidence. From a military point of view, whether the monastery was being used as an observation point was immaterial.

If not occupied today, it might be tomorrow and it did not appear it would be difficult for the enemy to bring reserves into it during an attack or for troops to take shelter there if driven from positions outside. It was impossible to ask troops to storm a hill surmounted by an intact building such as this, capable of sheltering several hundred infantry in perfect security from shellfire and ready at the critical moment to emerge and counter-attack. ... Undamaged it was a perfect shelter but with its narrow windows and level profiles an unsatisfactory fighting position. Smashed by bombing it was a jagged heap of broken masonry and debris open to effective fire from guns, mortars and strafing planes as well as being a death trap if bombed again. On the whole I thought it would be more useful to the Germans if we left it unbombed.

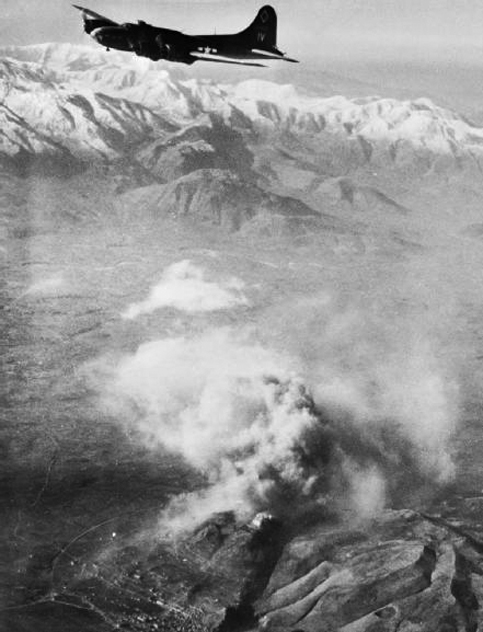
A B-17 Flying Fortress over Monte Cassino, 15 February 1944

Major General Francis Tuker, whose 4th Indian Division would have the task of attacking Monastery Hill, had made his own appraisal of the situation. In the absence of detailed intelligence at Fifth Army HQ, he found a book dated 1879 in a Naples bookshop that gave details of the construction of the abbey. In his memorandum to Freyberg, he concluded that regardless of whether the monastery was currently occupied by the Germans, it should be demolished to prevent its effective occupation. He also pointed out that with 150-foot (46 m) high walls made of masonry at least 10 feet (3.0 m) thick, there were no practical means for field engineers to deal with the place and that bombing with "blockbuster" bombs ("high capacity" bombs of 2,000 and 4,000 lb) would be the only solution since 1,000-pound bombs would be "next to useless". Tuker stated that he could only attack if the garrison was weakened by continuous bombing by air and artillery. Tuker's own opinion was that instead of continuing to batter against Cassino, attacks should be elsewhere where terrain was more favourable - at the Monte Cairo cutting the Via Casilina- and so isolating the area and thus forcing the Germans to retreat but, if the attack was to be against Cassino, then all German positions on the Cassino massif including Point 593- not just the abbey - should be attacked and the ground attack should immediately follow it. Initially Freyberg had accepted Tuker's suggestion for the attack but with Tuker absent from 2 February he started to have doubts and fell back on the idea of another direct attack on Cassino.

On 11 February 1944, the acting commander of the 4th Indian Division, Brigadier General Dimoline (usually the Commander Royal Artillery in 4th Indian), requested a bombing raid. Tuker reiterated his case again from a hospital bed in Caserta, where he was suffering a severe attack of a recurrent rheumatoid arthritis. Freyberg transmitted his request on 12 February for fighter bombers armed with 1,000 lb bombs. The request, however, was greatly expanded by air force planners and probably supported by Eaker and Devers, who sought to use the opportunity to showcase the abilities of U.S. Army air power to support ground operations. Clark and his chief of staff, Major General Alfred Gruenther, remained unconvinced of the "military necessity". When handing over the U.S. II Corps position to the New Zealand Corps, Brigadier General J.A. Butler, deputy commander of the U.S. 34th Division, said, "I don't know, but I don't believe the enemy is in the convent. All the fire has been from the slopes of the hill below the wall". Finally, Clark, "who did not want the monastery bombed", pinned down the Commander-in-Chief Allied Armies in Italy, Alexander, to take the responsibility: "I said, 'You give me a direct order and we'll do it,' and he did."

The bombing mission in the morning of 15 February 1944 involved 142 Boeing B-17 Flying Fortress heavy bombers, followed by 47 North American B-25 Mitchell and 40 Martin B-26 Marauder medium bombers. In all, they dropped 1,150 tonnes of high explosives and incendiary bombs on the abbey, reducing the entire summit of Monte Cassino to a smoking mass of rubble. Between bomb runs, the II Corps artillery pounded the mountain. Many Allied soldiers and war correspondents cheered as they observed the spectacle. Eaker and Devers watched; Juin was heard to remark, "no, they'll never get anywhere this way." Clark and Gruenther refused to be on the scene and stayed at their headquarters. That same afternoon and the next day, an aggressive follow-up of artillery and a raid by 59 fighter bombers wreaked further destruction. The German positions on Point 593 above and behind the monastery were untouched.

Damningly, the air raid had not been coordinated with ground commands, and an immediate infantry follow-up failed to materialise. Its timing had been driven by the Air Force, which viewed it as a separate operation, considering the availability of good weather and requirements on other fronts and theatres without reference to ground forces. The brigade commanders of the 4th Indian division were having a morning planning meeting and were surprised to see the bombers go overhead. Many of the troops had only taken over their positions from II Corps two days previously, and besides the difficulties in the mountains, preparations in the valley had also been held up by difficulties in supplying the newly installed troops with sufficient material for a full-scale assault because of incessantly foul weather, flooding, and waterlogged ground. As a result, Indian troops on the Snake's Head were taken by surprise, while the New Zealand Corps was two days away from being ready to launch their main assault.

=== After the bombing ===
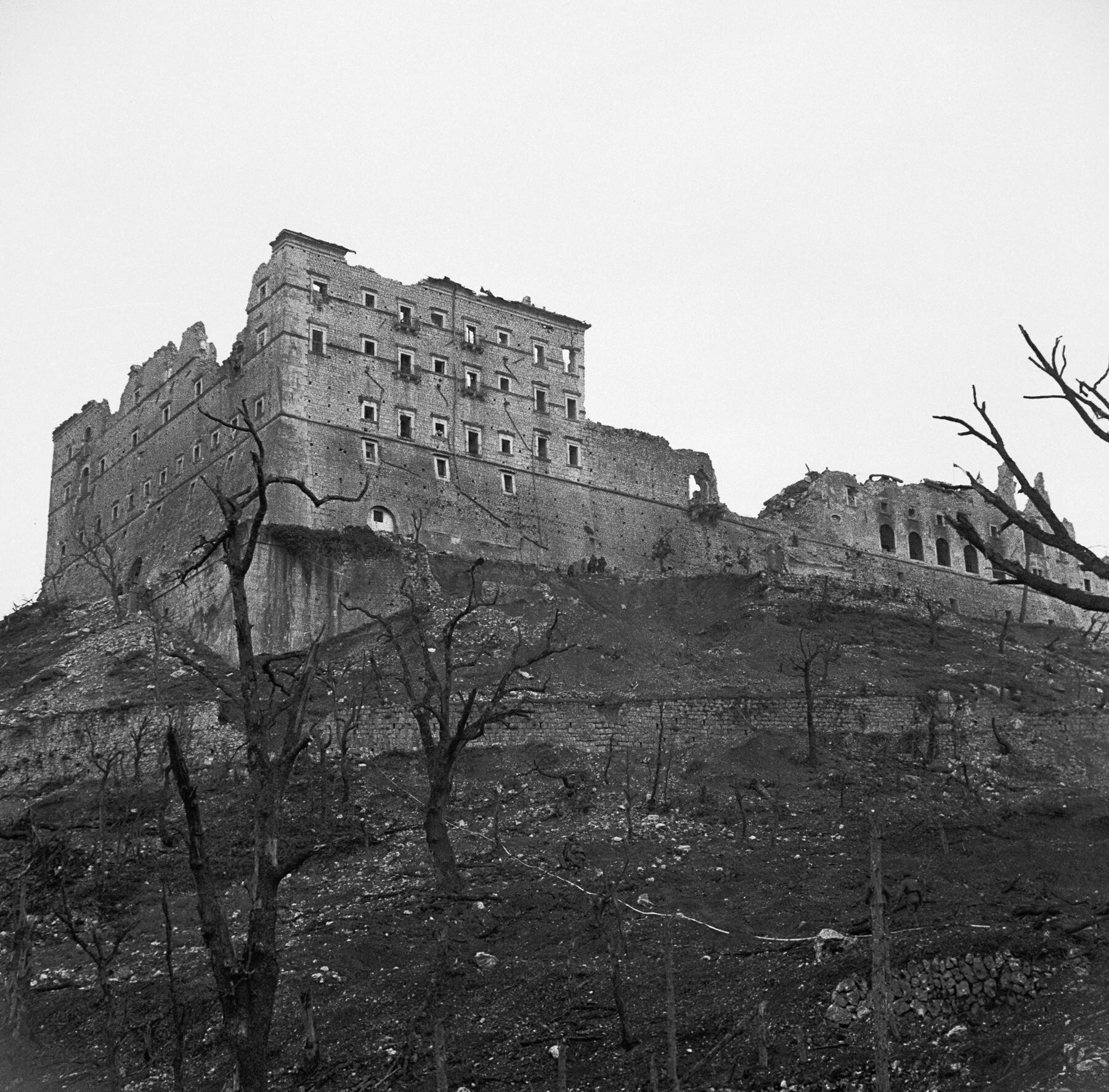
Monte Cassino in ruins

Pope Pius XII was silent after the bombing; however, his Cardinal Secretary of State, Luigi Maglione, bluntly stated to the senior U.S. diplomat to the Vatican, Harold Tittmann, that the bombing was "a colossal blunder … a piece of a gross stupidity".

From every investigation that followed since the event, it is certain that the only people killed in the monastery by the bombing were 230 Italian civilians seeking refuge in the abbey. There is no evidence that the bombs dropped on the Monte Cassino monastery that day killed any German troops. However, given the imprecision of bombing in those days (it was estimated that only 10 percent of the bombs from the heavy bombers, bombing from a high altitude, hit the monastery), bombs did fall elsewhere and kill German and Allied troops alike, although that would have been unintended. Indeed, sixteen bombs hit the Fifth Army compound at Presenzano, 17 miles (27 km) from Monte Cassino, and exploded only yards away from the trailer where Clark was doing paperwork at his desk.

On the day after the bombing, at first light, most of the civilians still alive fled the ruins. Only about 40 people remained: the six monks who survived in the deep vaults of the abbey; their 79-year-old abbot, Gregorio Diamare; three tenant farmer families; orphaned or abandoned children; the badly wounded; and the dying. After artillery barrages, renewed bombing, and attacks on the ridge by the 4th Indian Division, the monks decided to leave their ruined home with the others who could move at 07:30 on 17 February. The old abbot was leading the group down the mule path towards the Liri valley, reciting the rosary. After they arrived at a German first-aid station, some of the badly wounded who had been carried by the monks were taken away in a military ambulance. After meeting with a German officer, the monks were driven to the monastery of Sant'Anselmo all'Aventino. On 18 February, the abbot met the commander of the XIV Panzer Corps, Lieutenant-General Fridolin von Senger und Etterlin. One monk, Carlomanno Pellagalli, returned to the abbey; when he was later seen wandering the ruins, the German paratroopers thought he was a ghost. After 3 April, he was not seen again.

It is now known that the Germans had an agreement not to use the abbey for military purposes. (Note: The Germans concluded an agreement with the Vatican in December 1943 giving assurance that German troops would not occupy the abbey. The British official history, first published in 1973, states that the German commanders considered the "Cassino Position" to be the keystone of the defensive line but concludes that "There is abundant and convincing evidence that the Germans made no military use whatever of the abbey's buildings until after the Allies had wrecked them by bombing.") Following its destruction, paratroopers of the German 1st Parachute Division then occupied the ruins of the abbey and turned it into a fortress and observation post, which became a serious problem for the attacking Allied forces.

=== Battle ===
On the night following the bombing, a company of the 1st Battalion, Royal Sussex Regiment (one of the British elements in the 4th Indian Division) serving in the 7th Indian Infantry Brigade attacked key point 593 from their position 70 yards (64 m) away on Snakeshead Ridge. The assault failed, with the company sustaining 50 percent casualties.

The following night, the Royal Sussex Regiment was ordered to attack in battalion strength. There was a calamitous start. Artillery could not be used in direct support targeting point 593 because of the proximity and risk of shelling friendly troops. It was therefore planned to shell point 575, which had been providing supporting fire to the defenders of point 593. The topography of the land meant that shells fired at 575 had to pass very low over Snakeshead Ridge, and in the event that some fell among the gathering assault companies. After reorganising, the attack went in at midnight. The fighting was brutal and often hand-to-hand, but the determined defence held and the Royal Sussex battalion was beaten off, once again sustaining over 50 percent casualties. Over the two nights, the Royal Sussex Regiment lost 12 out of 15 officers and 162 out of 313 men who took part in the attack.

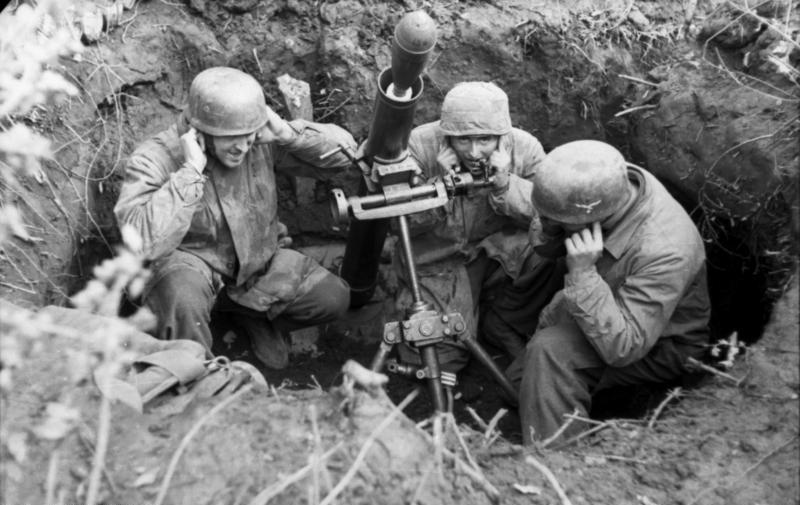
German paratroopers with mortar at Monte Cassino

On the night of 17 February, the main assault took place. The 4/6th Rajputana Rifles would take on the assault on Point 593 along Snakeshead Ridge with the depleted Royal Sussex Regiment held in reserve. 1/9th Gurkha Rifles were to attack Point 444. In the meantime, the 1/2nd Gurkha Rifles were to sweep across the slopes and ravines in a direct assault on the monastery. This latter was across appalling terrain, but it was hoped that the Gurkhas, so expert in mountain terrain, would succeed. This proved a faint hope. Once again, the fighting was brutal, but no progress was made and casualties were heavy. The Rajputanas lost 196 officers and men, the 1/9th Gurkhas 149 and the 1/2nd Gurkhas 96. It became clear that the attack had failed and on 18 February Dimoline and Freyberg called off the attacks on Monastery Hill.

In the other half of the main assault, the two companies from the 28th (Māori) Battalion from the New Zealand Division forced a crossing of the Rapido and attempted to gain the railway station in Cassino town. The intention was to create a perimeter that would allow engineers to build a causeway for armoured support. With the aid of a nearly constant smoke screen laid down by Allied artillery that obscured their location from the German batteries on Monastery Hill, the Māori were able to hold their positions for much of the day. Their isolation and lack of both armoured support and anti-tank guns made for a hopeless situation, however, when an armoured counterattack by two tanks came in the afternoon on 18 February. They were ordered to pull back to the river when it became clear to headquarters that both attempts to break through (in the mountains and along the causeway) would not succeed. It had been very close. The Germans had been very alarmed by the capture of the station, and from a recorded conversation between Kesselring and von Vietinghoff, they had not expected their counterattack to succeed.

After the war, regarding the second battle, Senger admitted that when he was contemplating the prospects of a renewed frontal assault on Cassino that "what I feared even more was an attack by Juin's corps with its superb Moroccan and Algerian divisions".

== Third battle (Operation Dickens) ==
Third Battle: Plan of Attack

=== Plans ===
For the third battle, it was decided that, while the winter weather persisted, fording the Garigliano river downstream of Cassino town was an unattractive option (after the unhappy experiences in the first two battles). The "right hook" in the mountains had also been a costly failure, and it was decided to launch twin attacks from the north along the Rapido valley: one towards the fortified Cassino town and the other towards Monastery Hill. The idea was to clear the path through the bottleneck between these two features to allow access towards the station on the south and so to the Liri Valley. The British 78th Infantry Division, which had arrived in late February and been placed under the command of the New Zealand Corps, would then cross the Rapido downstream of Cassino and start the push to Rome. Freyburg had taken on board Tuker's exhortations that an assault on Cassino needed saturation with artillery and bombs beforehand (though not that an attack on Cassino was irrational and that the attacks should be either side: on Monte Castellone and crossing the Rapido). He planned a saturation of the town of Cassino itself, already ruined and devoid of civilians, after which the New Zealand division would be in effect carrying out a "mopping up operation". (Note: The artillery assembled for the task far outweighed that available to the Germans. It was described in the official history as "216 field guns of the three divisions had to be added more than 150 field and medium guns of 2 AGRA, as well as the medium and heavy artillery of 2 United States Corps.") To guard the New Zealanders flank the Indian division would take the route up to the monastery.

The bombing plan was for "ten groups of heavy bombers and six groups of mediums, nearly 500 aircraft in all" working in relays to attack an area 1400 yards by 400 though "Late arrivals would be diverted to targets outside the town". Immediately following the bombing, at 12 o'clock, 6 Brigade was to advance, preceded by a creeping barrage while concentrations (Note: In a "concentration", many batteries would fire on a single target area rather the batteries fire being in parallel. The result was a greater density of fire than the 'barrage' where a line of shelling was generated.) of artillery fire would hit German defences in the town and to the south and escorted by tanks of 19 Armoured Regiment with the intention of capturing the town north of Route 6 by 2 pm. Then 6 Brigade would continue south through the town to the railway. At the same time 5 Indian Brigade would be working step by step along the eastern slopes of Monte cassino and turning uphill to capture Hangman's Hill (Point 435) The 7 Indian Brigade would be maintaining pressure on the defenders in the monastery ruins.

None of the Allied commanders were very happy with the plan, but it was hoped that an unprecedented preliminary bombing by heavy bombers would prove the trump. To avoid taking vehicles across waterlogged ground, three clear days of good weather were required, and for twenty-one successive days the assault was postponed as the troops waited in the freezing wet positions for a favourable weather forecast. Things were not helped by the loss of Kippenberger who while on Mount Trocchio surveying the battlefield was wounded by an anti-personnel mine and as a result lost both his feet. The news depressed the morale of the New Zealand troops further. He was replaced by Brigadier Graham Parkinson; a German counter-attack at Anzio had failed and been called off.

=== The battle ===
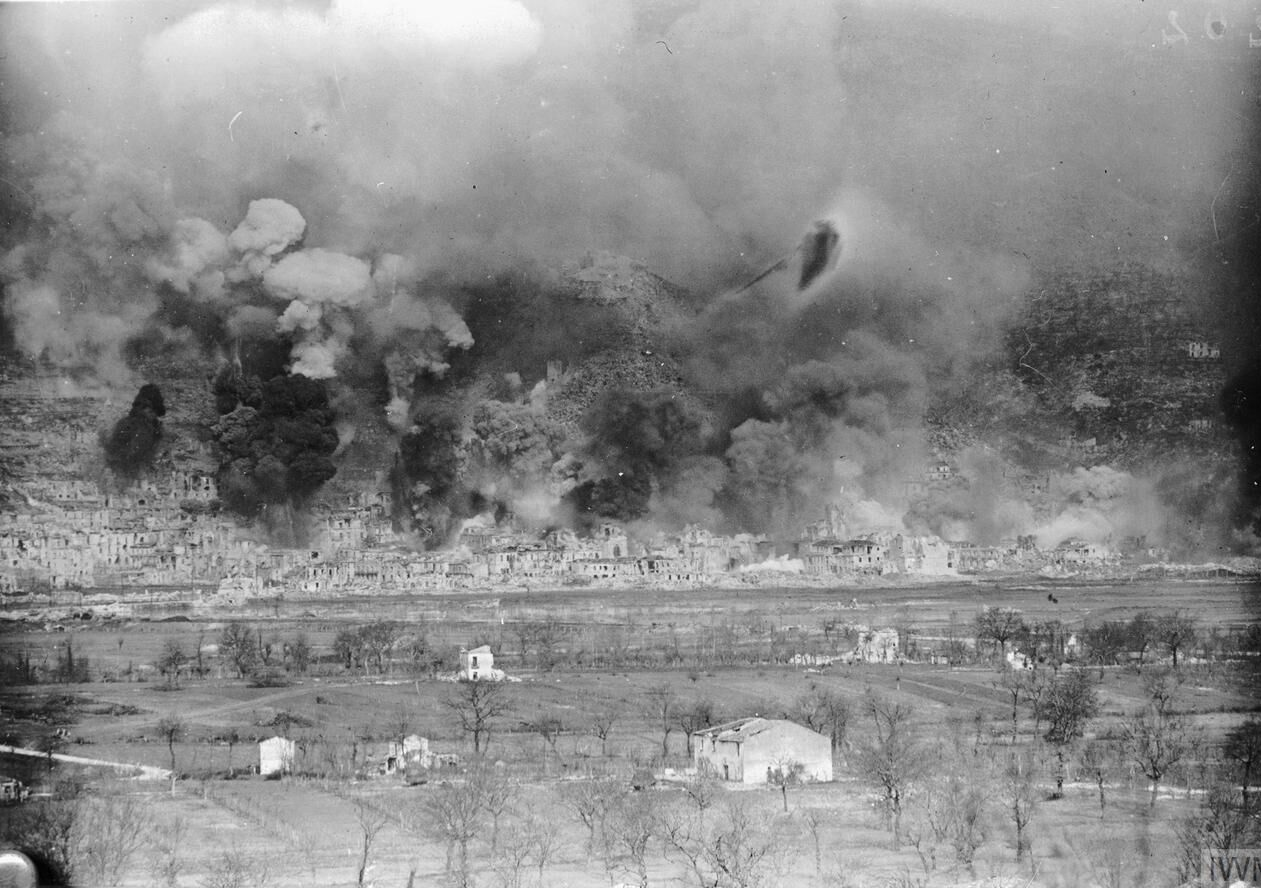
Bombing of 15 March

The third battle began 15 March. After a bombardment of 750 tonnes of 1,000-pound bombs with delayed action fuses, starting at 8:30 and lasting three and a half hours, the New Zealanders advanced behind a creeping artillery barrage of 746 artillery pieces. Success depended on taking advantage of the paralysing effect of the bombing. The bombing was not concentrated—only 50 percent landed a mile or less from the target point and 8 percent within 1,000 yards—but between it and the shelling, about half the 300 paratroopers in the town had been killed. The defences rallied more quickly than expected, and the Allied armour was held up by bomb craters. Nevertheless, success was there for the New Zealanders' taking, but by the time a follow-up assault on the left had been ordered that evening, it was too late: defences had been reorganised, and more critically, the rain, contrary to forecast, had started again. Torrents of rain flooded bomb craters, turned rubble into a morass, and blotted out communications, the radio sets being incapable of surviving the constant immersion. The dark rain clouds also blotted out the moonlight, hindering the task of clearing routes through the ruins. On the right, the New Zealanders had captured Castle Hill and point 165, and as planned, elements of the Indian 4th Infantry Division, now commanded by Major General Alexander Galloway, had passed through to attack point 236 and thence to point 435, Hangman's Hill. (Note: A knoll with the remnants of a cable car pylon leading to appearance of a gibbet) In the confusion of the fight, a company of the 1/9th Gurkha Rifles took a track avoiding point 236 and captured point 435, while the assault on point 236 by the 1/6th Rajputana Rifles was repelled.

By the end of 17 March, the Gurkhas held Hangman's Hill (point 435), 250 yards (230 m) from the monastery, in battalion strength (although their lines of supply were compromised by the German positions at point 236 and in the northern part of the town), and whilst the town was still fiercely defended, New Zealand units and armour advanced through the bottleneck and captured the station. Despite the setback, the Germans were still able to reinforce their troops in the town and position snipers in parts of the town that had supposedly been cleared.

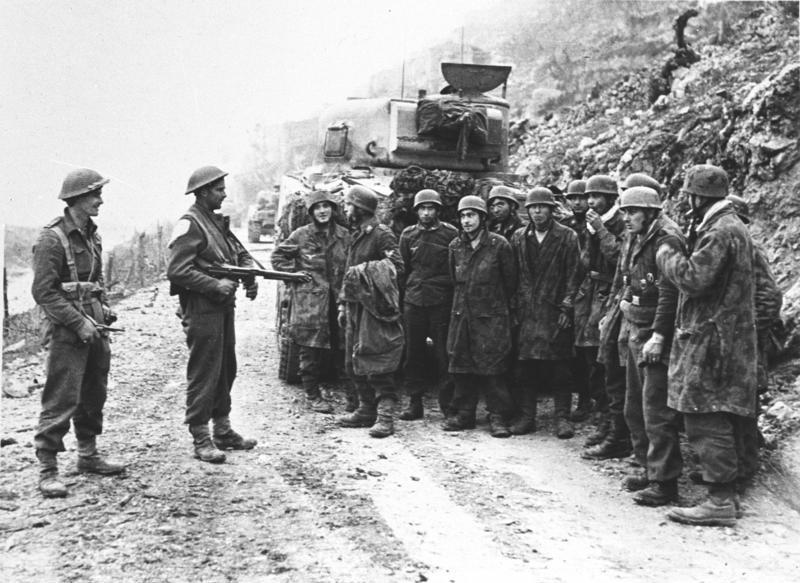
German prisoners captured by New Zealand troops are held beside a Sherman tank. After repeated unsuccessful assaults, the Allied offensive was again called off on 22 March.

19 March was planned for the decisive blow in the town and on the monastery, including a surprise attack by tanks of the 20th Armoured Regiment working their way along an old logging road (the "Cavendish Road") from Caira to Albaneta Farm (which had been prepared by engineer units under the cover of darkness) and from there towards the abbey. However, a surprise and fiercely pressed counter-attack from the monastery on Castle Hill by the German 1st Parachute Division completely disrupted any possibility of an assault on the monastery from the Castle and Hangman's Hill, while the tanks, lacking infantry support, were all knocked out by mid-afternoon. In the town, the attackers made little progress, and overall the initiative was passing to the Germans, whose positions close to Castle Hill, which was the gateway to the position on Monastery Hill, crippled any prospects of early success.

On 20 March Freyberg committed elements of the 78th Infantry Division to the battle, firstly to provide a greater troop presence in the town so that cleared areas would not be reinfiltrated by the Germans, and secondly to reinforce Castle Hill to allow troops to be released to close off the two routes between Castle Hill and Points 175 and 165 being used by the Germans to reinforce the defenders in the town. The Allied commanders felt they were on the brink of success as grim fighting continued through 21 March. However, the defenders were resolute, and the attack on Point 445 to block the German reinforcement route had narrowly failed, whilst in the town, Allied gains were measured only house by house.

On 23 March Alexander met with his commanders. A range of opinions was expressed as to the possibility of victory, but it was evident that the New Zealand and Indian Divisions were exhausted. Freyberg was convinced that the attack could not continue, so he called it off. The German 1st Parachute Division had taken a mauling but had held.

=== Aftermath ===
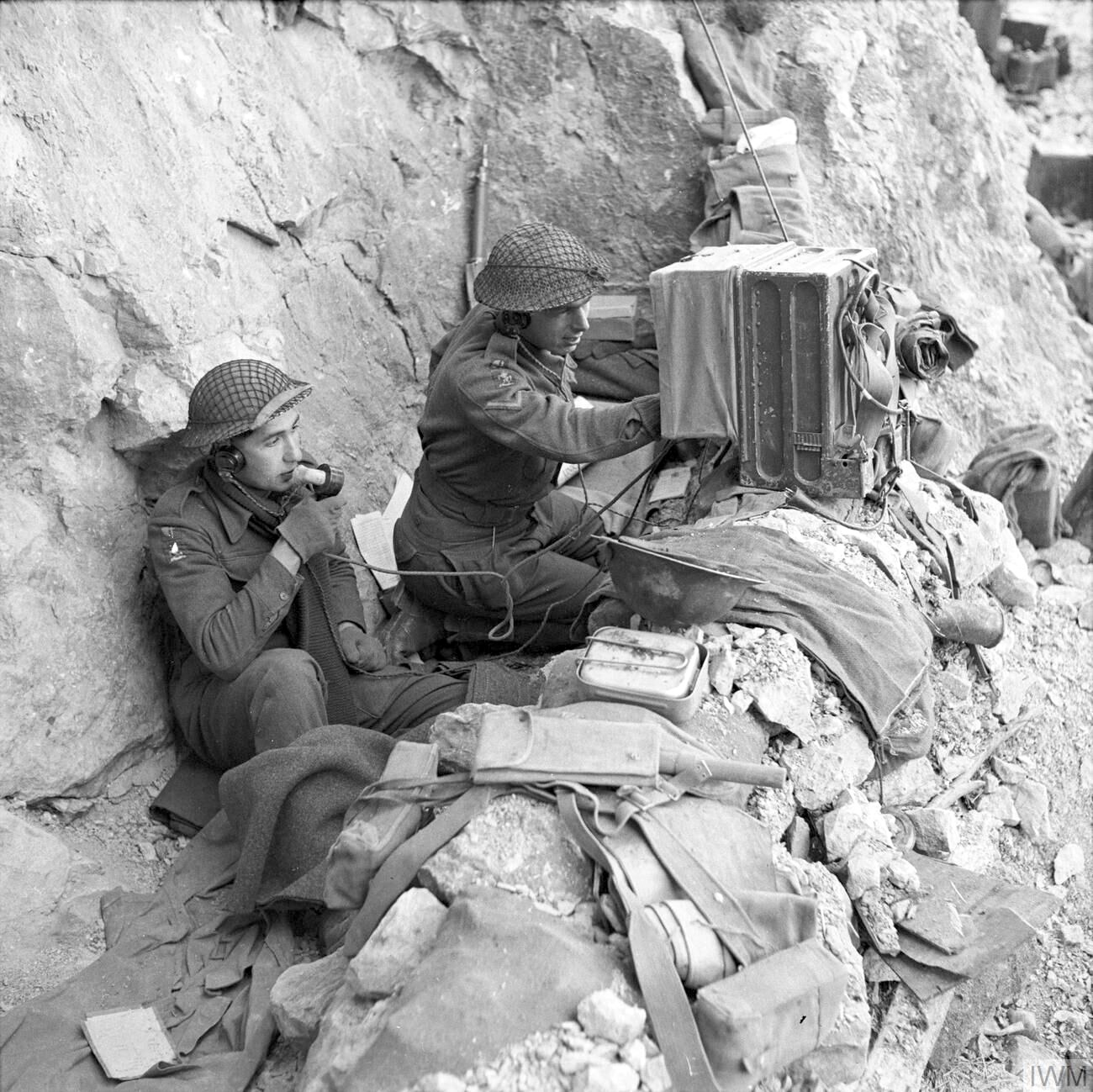
Signallers of the 6th Battalion, Queen's Own Royal West Kent Regiment, use a radio in a dugout on Monastery Hill.

The next three days were spent stabilising the front, extracting the isolated Gurkhas from Hangman's Hill, and the detachment from the New Zealand 24th Battalion, which had held Point 202 in similar isolation. The Allied line was reorganised, with the exhausted 4th Indian Division and 2nd New Zealand Division withdrawn and replaced, respectively, in the mountains by the British 78th Division and in the town by the British 1st Guards Brigade. The New Zealand Corps headquarters was dissolved on 26 March and control was assumed by the British XIII Corps. In their time on the Cassino front line, the 4th Indian Division had lost 3,000 men and the 2nd New Zealand Division 1,600 men killed, missing, or wounded.

The German defenders too had paid a heavy price. The German XIV Corps War Diary for 23 March noted that the battalions in the front line had strengths varying between 40 and 120 men.

== Fourth and final battle (Operation Diadem) ==
Operation Diadem's plan of attack

=== Alexander's strategy ===
Alexander's strategy in Italy was to "force the enemy to commit the maximum number of divisions in Italy at the time the cross-channel invasion [of Normandy] is launched". Circumstances allowed him the time to prepare a major offensive to achieve this. His plan, originally inspired by Juin's idea to circle around Cassino and take the Aurunci with his mountain troops to break the Gustav Line, was to shift the bulk of the British Eighth Army, commanded by Lieutenant-General Sir Oliver Leese, from the Adriatic front across the spine of Italy to join Clark's Fifth Army and attack along a 20-mile (32 km) front between Cassino and the sea. Fifth Army (U.S. II Corps and French Expeditionary Corps) would be on the left, and Eighth Army (British XIII Corps and Polish II Corps) on the right. With the arrival of the spring weather, ground conditions improved, and it would be possible to deploy large formations and armour effectively.

=== Planning and preparation ===
The plan for Operation Diadem was that U.S. II Corps, on the left, would attack up the coast along the line of Route 7 towards Rome. The French Corps to their right would attack from the bridgehead across the Garigliano, originally created by British X Corps in the first battle in January, into the Aurunci Mountains, which formed a barrier between the coastal plain and the Liri Valley. British XIII Corps in the centre right of the front would attack along the Liri valley. On the right, Polish II Corps (3rd and 5th Divisions), commanded by Lieutenant General Władysław Anders, had relieved the British 78th Division in the mountains behind Cassino on 24 April and would attempt the task that had defeated the 4th Indian Division in February: isolate the monastery and push round behind it into the Liri valley to link with XIII Corps' thrust and pinch out the Cassino position. It was hoped that, being a much larger force than their 4th Indian Division predecessors, they would be able to saturate the German defences, which would, as a result, be unable to give supporting fire to each other's positions. Improved weather, ground conditions, and supply would also be important factors. Once again, the pinching manoeuvres by the Polish and British Corps were key to the overall success. The Canadian I Corps would be held in reserve, ready to exploit the expected breakthrough. Once the German 10th Army had been defeated, the U.S. VI Corps would break out of the Anzio beachhead to cut off the retreating Germans in the Alban Hills.

The large troop movements required for this took two months to execute. They had to be carried out in small units to maintain secrecy and surprise. The U.S. 36th Division was sent on amphibious assault training, and road signposts and dummy radio traffic were created to give the impression that a seaborne landing was being planned for north of Rome. This was planned to keep the German reserves held back from the Gustav Line. Movements of troops in forward areas were confined to the hours of darkness, and armoured units moving from the Adriatic front left behind dummy tanks and vehicles, so the vacated areas appeared unchanged to enemy aerial reconnaissance. The deception was successful. As late as the second day of the final Cassino battle, Kesselring estimated the Allies had six divisions facing his four on the Cassino front. In fact, there were thirteen.

=== Battle ===
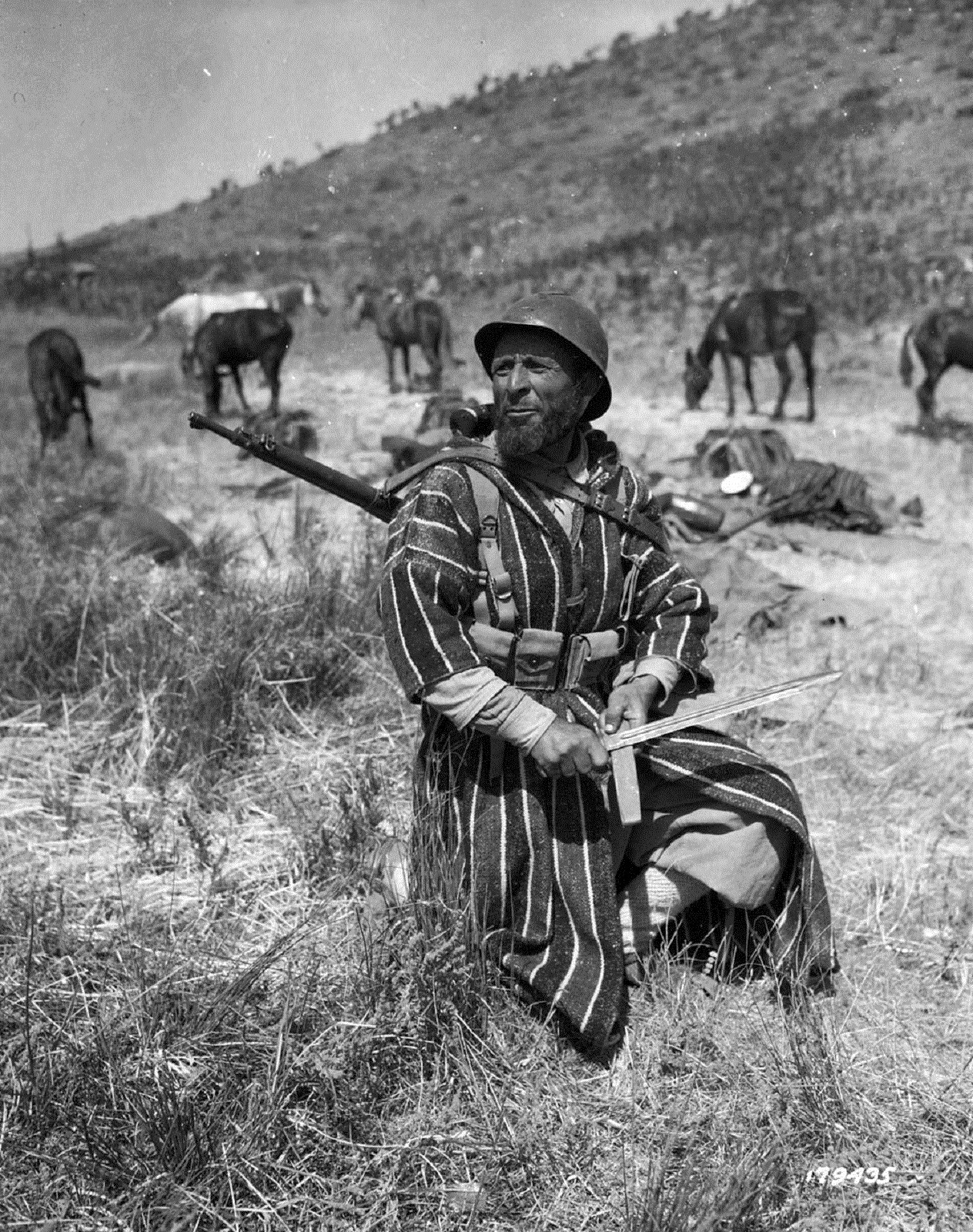
Moroccan Goumier

The first assault (11–12 May) on Cassino opened at 23:00 with a massive artillery bombardment with 1,060 guns on the Eighth Army front and 600 guns on the Fifth Army front, manned by British, Americans, Poles, New Zealanders, South Africans, and French. Within an hour and a half, the attack was in motion in all four sectors. By daylight, the U.S. II Corps had made little progress, but their Fifth Army colleagues, the French Expeditionary Corps, had achieved their objectives and were fanning out in the Aurunci Mountains towards the Eighth Army to their right, rolling up the German positions between the two armies. On the Eighth Army front, the British XIII Corps had made two strongly opposed crossings of the Garigliano (by the British 4th Infantry Division and the 8th Indian Division). Crucially, the engineers of Dudley Russell's 8th Indian Division had by the morning succeeded in bridging the river, enabling the armour of the 1st Canadian Armoured Brigade to cross and provide the vital element (so missed by the Americans in the first battle and the New Zealanders in the second battle) to beat off the inevitable counterattacks from German tanks that would come.

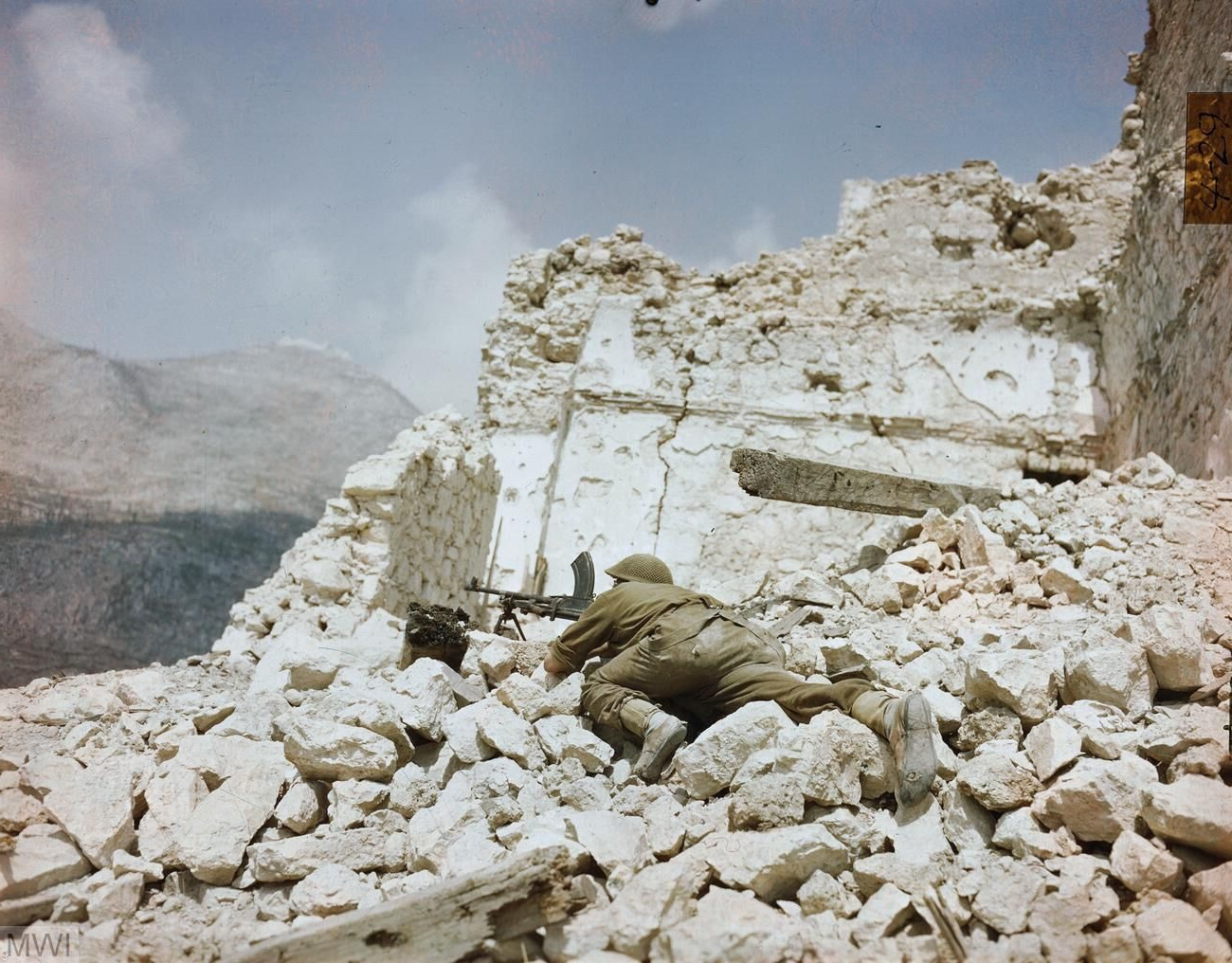
A British soldier with a Bren gun in the ruins of Monte Cassino

In the mountains above Cassino, Mount Calvary (Monte Calvario, or Point 593 on Snakeshead Ridge) was taken by the Polish 2nd Corps, under the command of General Władysław Anders, only to be recaptured by German paratroopers. For three days, Polish attacks and German counterattacks brought heavy losses to both sides. The Polish II Corps lost 281 officers and 3,503 other ranks in assaults on Oberst Ludwig Heilmann's 4th Parachute Regiment until the attacks were called off. "Just eight hundred Germans had succeeded in driving off attacks by two divisions," the area around the mountain having turned into a "miniature Verdun". In the early morning hours of 12 May, the Polish infantry divisions were met with "such devastating mortar, artillery and small-arms fire that the leading battalions were all but wiped out".

By the afternoon of 12 May, the Gari bridgeheads were increasing despite furious counterattacks, while attrition on the coast and in the mountains continued. By 13 May the pressure was starting to tell. The German right wing began to give way to the Fifth Army. The French Corps had captured Monte Maio and were now in a position to give material flank assistance to the Eighth Army in the Liri Valley, against whom Kesselring had thrown every available reserve in order to buy time to switch to his second prepared defensive position, the Hitler Line, some 8 miles (13 km) to the rear. On 14 May Moroccan Goumiers, travelling through the mountains parallel to the Liri valley on ground that was undefended because it was not thought possible to traverse such terrain, outflanked the German defence while materially assisting the XIII Corps in the valley. In 1943, the Goumiers were colonial troops formed into four Groupements des Tabors Marocains ("Groups of Moroccan Tabors"; GTM), each consisting of three loosely organised Tabors (roughly equivalent to a battalion) that specialised in mountain warfare. Juin's French Expeditionary Corps consisted of General Augustin Guillaume's Commandement des Goumiers Marocains (CGM) (with the 1st, 3rd, and 4th GTM) totaling around 7,800 fighting men, roughly the same infantry strength as a division, and four more conventional divisions: the 2nd Moroccan Infantry Division (2 DIM), the 3rd Algerian Infantry Division (3 DIA), the 4th Moroccan Mountain Division (4 DMM) and the 1st Free French Division (1 DM).

Clark also paid tribute to the Goumiers and the Moroccan regulars of the Tirailleur units:

In spite of the stiffening enemy resistance, the 2nd Moroccan Division penetrated the Gustave [sic] Line in less than two-day's [sic] fighting. The next 48 hours on the French front were decisive. The knife-wielding Goumiers swarmed over the hills, particularly at night and General Juin's entire force showed an aggressiveness hour after hour that the Germans could not withstand. Cerasola, San Giorgio, Mt. D'Oro, Ausonia and Esperia were seized in one of the most brilliant and daring advances of the war in Italy ... For this performance, which was to be a key to the success of the entire drive on Rome, I shall always be a grateful admirer of General Juin and his magnificent FEC.

On 15 May, the British 78th Division, with an attached armoured brigade under command, came into the British XIII Corps line from reserve, passing through the British 4th Infantry Division's bridgehead to execute the turning move to isolate Cassino from the Liri valley.

On 17 May, General Anders led the Polish II Corps in launching their second attack on Monte Cassino. Under constant artillery and mortar fire from the strongly fortified German positions and with little natural cover for protection, the fighting was fierce and at times hand-to-hand. With their line of supply threatened by the Allied advance in the Liri valley, the Germans decided to withdraw from the Cassino Heights to the new defensive positions on the Hitler Line. In the early hours of 18 May, the British 78th Division and Polish II Corps linked up in the Liri valley, 2 miles (3.2 km) west of Cassino town. On the Cassino high ground, the survivors of the second Polish offensive were so battered that "it took some time to find men with enough strength to climb the few hundred yards to the summit." A patrol of the Polish 12th Podolian Cavalry Regiment finally made it to the heights and raised a Polish flag over the ruins. The only remnants of the defenders were a group of thirty German wounded who had been unable to move.

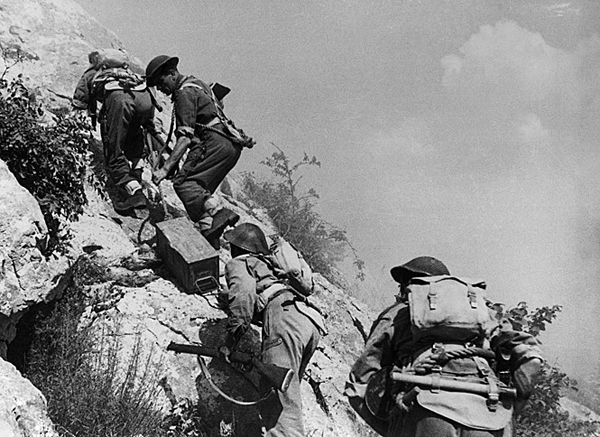
Polish soldiers carry ammunition to the front lines just before the capture of the abbey

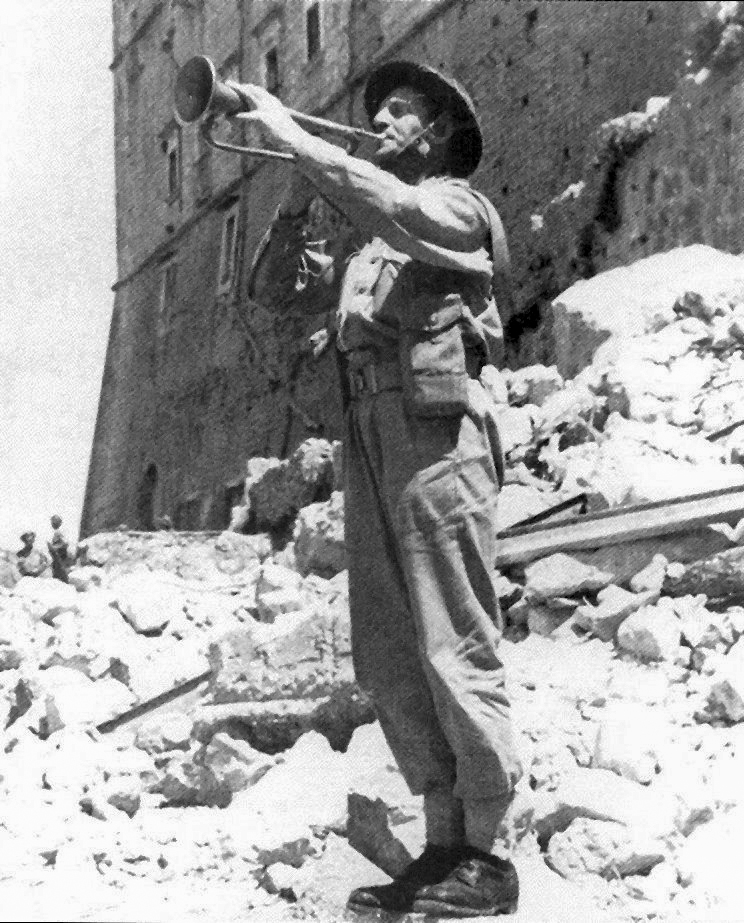
Emil Czech, a Polish bugler, plays the Hejnał mariacki, announcing the victory

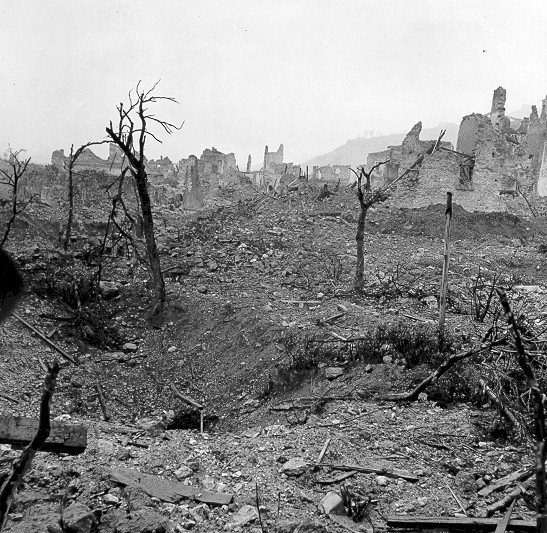
Ruins of the town of Cassino after the battle

== Aftermath ==
=== Hitler Line ===
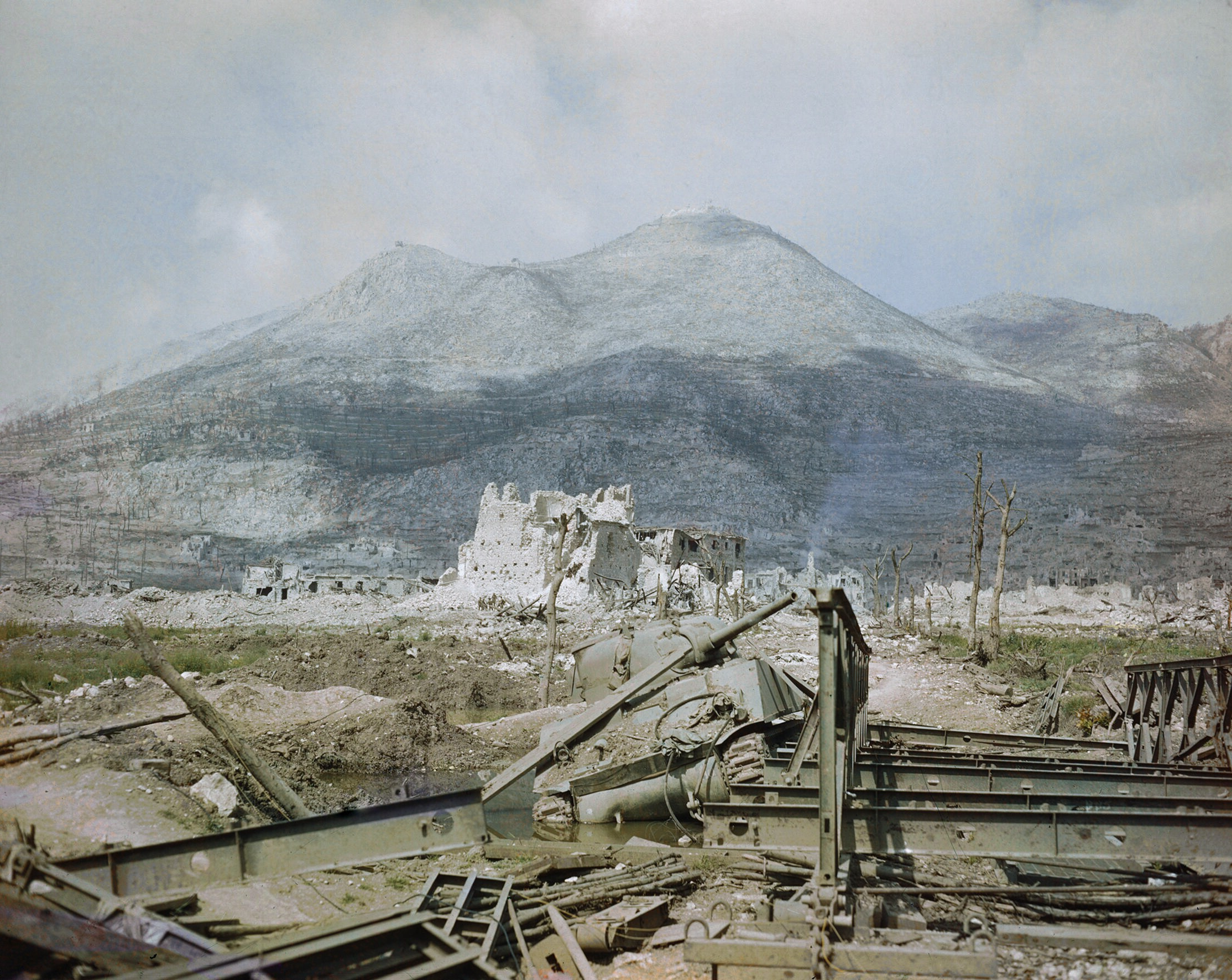
The ruins of Cassino town with a knocked-out Sherman tank by a Bailey bridge in the foreground with Monastery Ridge and Castle Hill in the background, May 1944.

Units of the Eighth Army advanced up the Liri valley and the Fifth Army up the coast to the Hitler defensive line (renamed the Senger Line at Hitler's insistence to minimise the significance if it was penetrated). An immediate follow-up assault failed, and the Eighth Army then decided to take some time to reorganise. Getting 20,000 vehicles and 2,000 tanks through the broken Gustav Line was a major job that took several days. The next assault on the line commenced on 23 May with the Polish II Corps attacking Piedimonte San Germano (defended by the redoubtable German 1st Parachute Division) on the right and the 1st Canadian Infantry Division (fresh from the Eighth Army Reserve) in the centre. On 24 May, the Canadians had breached the line and 5th Canadian (Armoured) Division poured through the gap. On 25 May, the Poles took Piedimonte, and the line collapsed. The way was clear for the advance northward on Rome and beyond.

=== Anzio breakout ===
As the Canadians and Poles launched their attack on the Hitler Line on 23 May, Major General Lucian Truscott, who had replaced General Lucas as commander of the U.S. VI Corps in February, launched a two-pronged attack using five (three U.S. and two British) of the seven divisions from the beachhead at Anzio. The German 14th Army, facing this thrust, was without any armoured divisions because Kesselring had sent his armour south to assist the German 10th Army in the Cassino action. A single armoured division, the 26th Panzer, was in transit from north of the Italian capital of Rome, where it had been held anticipating the nonexistent seaborne landing the Allies had faked and so was unavailable to fight.

=== Clark captures Rome but fails to trap the German Tenth Army ===
By 25 May, with the German 10th Army in full retreat, Truscott's VI Corps was, as planned, driving eastwards to cut them off. By the next day, they would have been astride the line of retreat, and the 10th Army, with all of Kesselring's reserves committed to them, would have been trapped. At this point, astonishingly, Clark ordered Truscott to change his line of attack from a northeasterly one to Valmontone on Route 6 to a northwesterly one directly towards Rome. The reasons for Clark's decision are unclear, and controversy surrounds the issue. Most commentators point to Clark's ambition to be the first to arrive in Rome, although some suggest he was concerned to give a necessary respite to his tired troops (notwithstanding the new direction of attack that required his troops to make a frontal attack on the Germans' prepared defences on the Caesar C line). Truscott later wrote in his memoirs that Clark "was fearful that the British were laying devious plans to be first into Rome", a sentiment somewhat reinforced in Clark's own writings. However, General Alexander, the C-in-C of the AAI, had clearly laid down the army boundaries before the battle, and Rome was allocated to the Fifth Army. Leese's British Eighth Army was constantly reminded that their job was to engage the 10th Army, destroy as much of it as possible, and then bypass Rome to continue the pursuit northwards (which in fact they did, harassing the retreating 10th Army for some 225 miles (362 km) towards Perugia in 6 weeks).

At the time, Truscott was shocked, writing later:

I was dumbfounded. This was no time to drive to the northwest where the enemy was still strong; we should pour our maximum power into the Valmontone Gap to insure the destruction of the retreating German Army. I would not comply with the order without first talking to General Clark in person. ... [However] he was not on the beachhead and could not be reached even by radio. ... such was the order that turned the main effort of the beachhead forces from the Valmontone Gap and prevented destruction of Tenth Army. On the 26th the order was put into effect.

He went on to write:

There has never been any doubt in my mind that had General Clark held loyally to General Alexander's instructions, had he not changed the direction of my attack to the northwest on 26 May, the strategic objectives of Anzio would have been accomplished in full. To be first in Rome was a poor compensation for this lost opportunity.

An opportunity was indeed missed, and seven divisions of the 10th Army were able to make their way to the next line of defence, the Trasimene Line, where they were able to link up with the 14th Army and then make a fighting withdrawal to the formidable Gothic Line north of Florence.

Rome was captured on 4 June 1944, just two days before the Normandy invasion.

== Battle honours ==
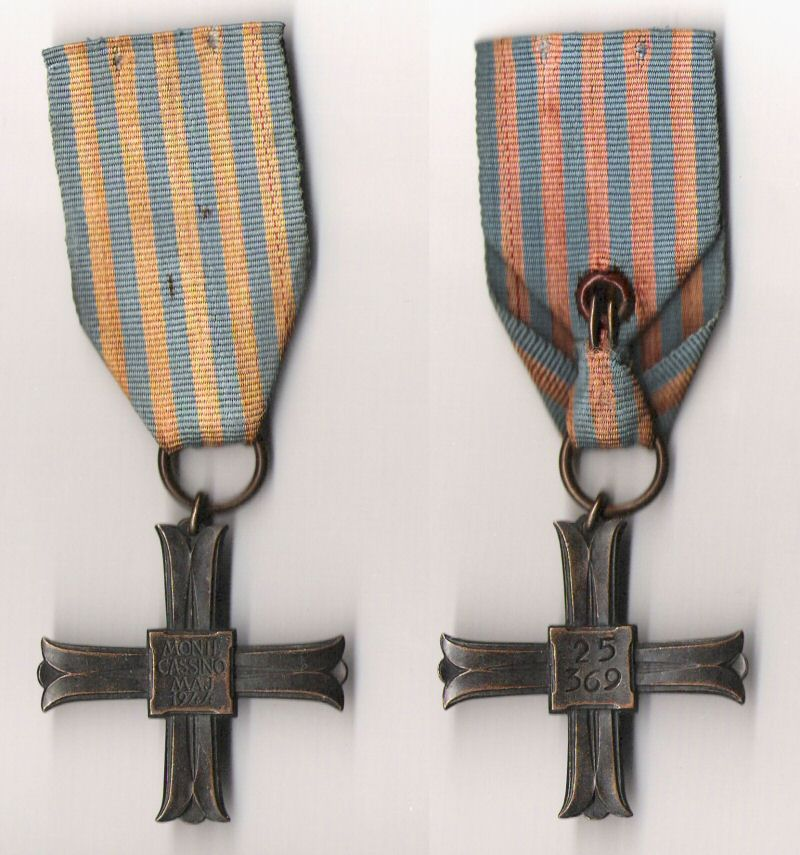
Polish Monte Cassino Commemorative Cross

Some units were awarded battle honours by the British and Commonwealth Armies for their roles at Cassino. Specifically, units that participated in the first part of the campaign were awarded the battle honour 'Cassino I'. Subsidiary battle honours were also given to units that participated in specific engagements during this part, including Monastery Hill, Castle Hill, and Hangman's Hill.

Units that participated in the later part of the battle were awarded the honour 'Cassino II'.

All members of the Polish units were awarded the Monte Cassino Commemorative Cross.

== Casualties ==
The capture of Monte Cassino came at a high price, though sources differ on the degree. Axelrod states that the Allies suffered around 55,000 casualties in the Monte Cassino campaign, while German casualty figures are estimated at around 20,000 killed and wounded. Parker meanwhile states that total Allied casualties spanning the period of the four Cassino battles and the Anzio campaign, with the subsequent capture of Rome on 5 June 1944, were over 105,000, while Axis casualties were at least 80,000. Holland states the casualties for the period 11 May to 6 June only (ie. For Operation Diadem) were 51,754 for the Axis (ie. one-third of total fighting strength) and 43,746 for the Allies.

According to data complied by Italian non-profit organization Dal Volturno a Cassino, 5,934 Commonwealth soldiers (British, Canadian, Newfoundland, New Zealand, South African and Indian) were killed, 4,345 French soldiers were killed, around 3,000 American soldiers were killed, 1,052 Polish soldiers were killed, and 80 Italian soldiers of the Italian Co-belligerent Army were killed (in December 1943 only). As for German dead, Dal Volturno a Cassino estimated that around 15,000 Germans had been killed during the battle. Dal Volturno a Cassino did not list any figures or estimates for the losses of the National Republican Army.

The town of Cassino was completely razed by the air and artillery bombardments (especially by the air raid of 15 March 1944, when 1,250 tonnes of bombs were dropped on the town), and 2,026 of its prewar population of 20,000 were killed during the raids and the battle.

== Legacy ==
=== Evacuation and treasures ===
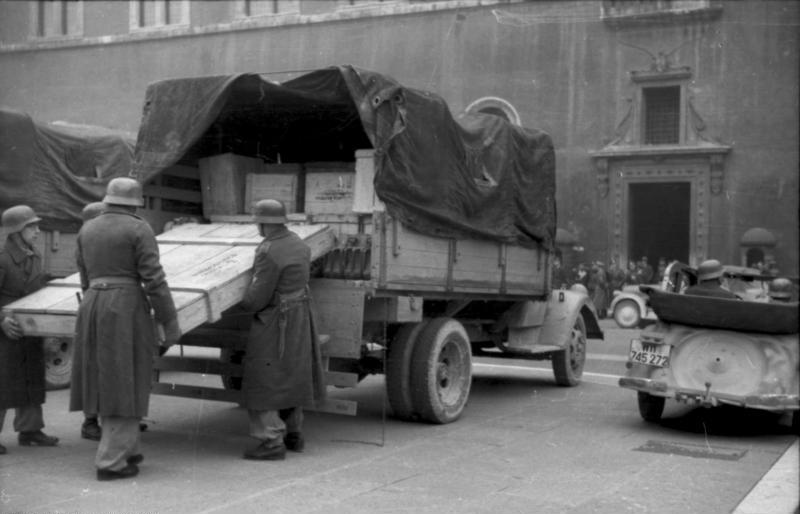
Unloading of Monte Cassino property in the Piazza Venezia in Rome

In the course of the battles, the ancient abbey of Monte Cassino, where St. Benedict in AD 516 first established the Rule that ordered monasticism in the west, was entirely destroyed by Allied bombing and artillery barrages in February 1944. (Note: It would not be the first time the abbey had been demolished over the centuries: between 577 and 589 Monte Cassino was destroyed by the Lombards; by the Saracens in 883; and by an earthquake in 1349.)

Some months earlier, in the Italian autumn of 1943, two officers in the Hermann Göring Panzer Division, Captain Maximilian Becker and Lieutenant Colonel Julius Schlegel, proposed the removal of Monte Cassino's treasures to the Vatican and Vatican-owned Castel Sant'Angelo ahead of the approaching front. The officers convinced church authorities and their own senior commanders to use the division's trucks and fuel for the undertaking. They had to find the materials necessary for crates and boxes, find carpenters among their troops, recruit local labourers (paid with rations of food plus twenty cigarettes a day), and then manage the "massive job of evacuation centered on the library and archive", a treasure "literally without price". The richness of the abbey's archives, library, and gallery included "800 papal documents, 20,500 volumes in the Old Library, 60,000 in the New Library, 500 incunabula, 200 manuscripts on parchment, 100,000 prints and separate collections". The first trucks, carrying paintings by Italian old masters, were ready to go less than a week from the day Becker and Schlegel independently first came to Monte Cassino. Each vehicle carried monks to Rome as escorts; in more than 100 truckloads, the convoys saved the abbey's monastic community. The task was completed in the first days of November 1943. "In three weeks, in the middle of a losing war, in another country, it was quite a feat." After a mass in the basilica, Abbot Gregorio Diamare formally presented signed parchment scrolls in Latin to General Paul Conrath, to tribuno militum Julio Schlegel and to Maximiliano Becker medecinae doctori "for rescuing the monks and treasures of the Abbey of Monte Cassino".

Among the treasures removed were Titians, an El Greco, and two Goyas.

=== A Canticle for Leibowitz ===
The American writer Walter M. Miller Jr., a Catholic, served as part of a bomber crew that participated in the destruction of the ancient Monte Cassino monastery. As Miller stated, this experience deeply influenced him and directly resulted in his writing, a decade later, the book A Canticle for Leibowitz, which is considered a masterpiece of science fiction. The book tells the story of a group of monks who are committed to preserving the remnants of scientific knowledge after a nuclear war until the world is ready to receive it again.

=== United States military history reviews ===
The U.S. government's official position on the German occupation of Monte Cassino changed over a quarter-century. The assertion that the German use of the abbey was "irrefutable" was removed from the record in 1961 by the Office of the Chief of Military History. A congressional inquiry to the same office in the 20th anniversary year of the bombing stated: "It appears that no German troops, except a small military police detachment, were actually inside the abbey" before the bombing. The final change to the U.S. Army's official record was made in 1969 and concluded that "the abbey was actually unoccupied by German troops."

=== Marocchinate ===
Reports indicate that some French Moroccan troops attached to the French Expeditionary Forces committed acts of rape and murder in the surrounding hills after the battle. Some of these units were accused of committing atrocities against the Italian peasant communities in the region. In Italy, the victims of these acts were described as Marocchinate meaning literally "Moroccaned" (or people who have been subjected to acts committed by Moroccans). A fictional instance of rape by Moroccan troops forms the basis of Alberto Moravia's 1957 novel Two Women.

=== War graves and memorials ===
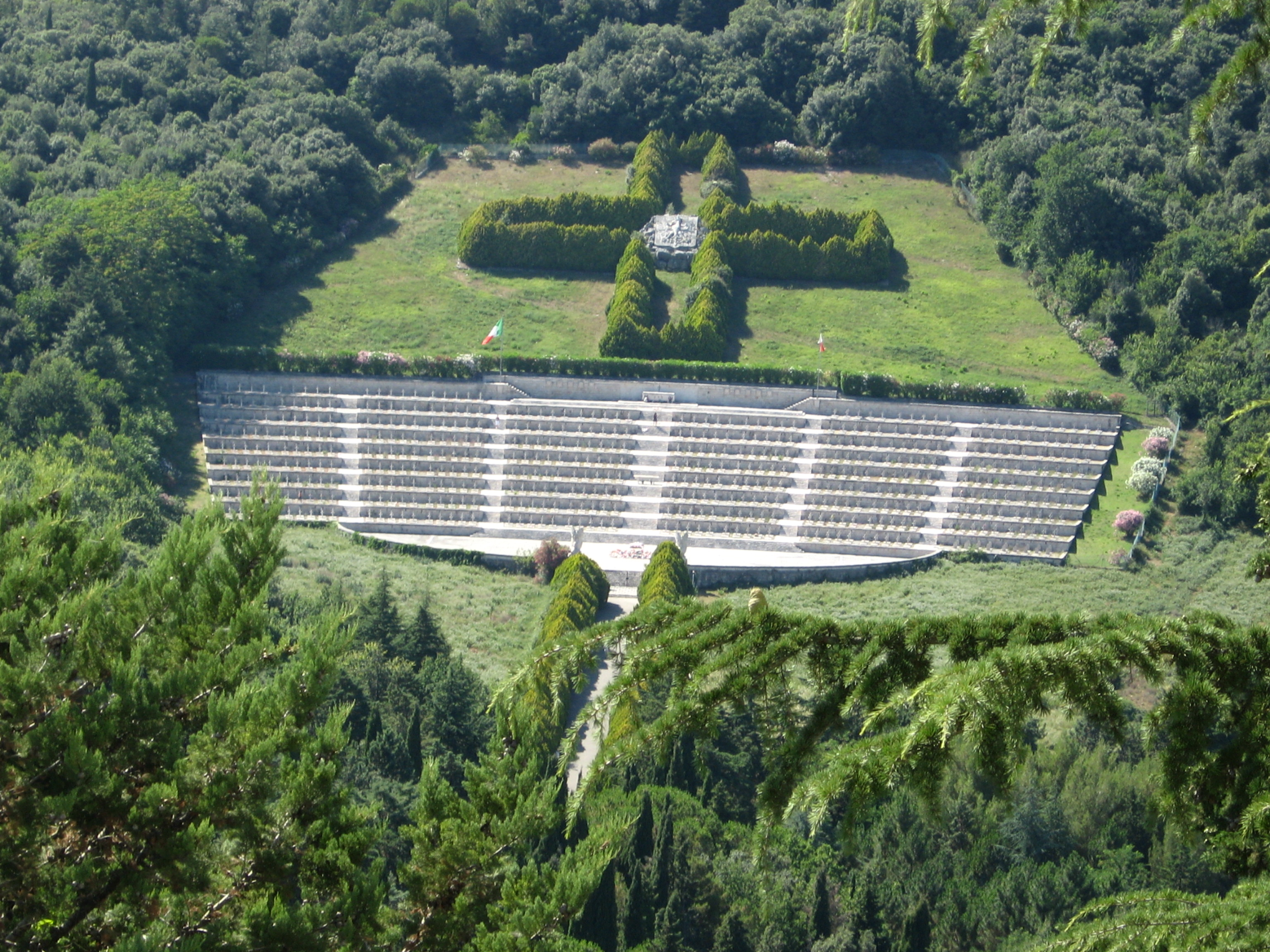
Monte Cassino: the Polish War Cemetery

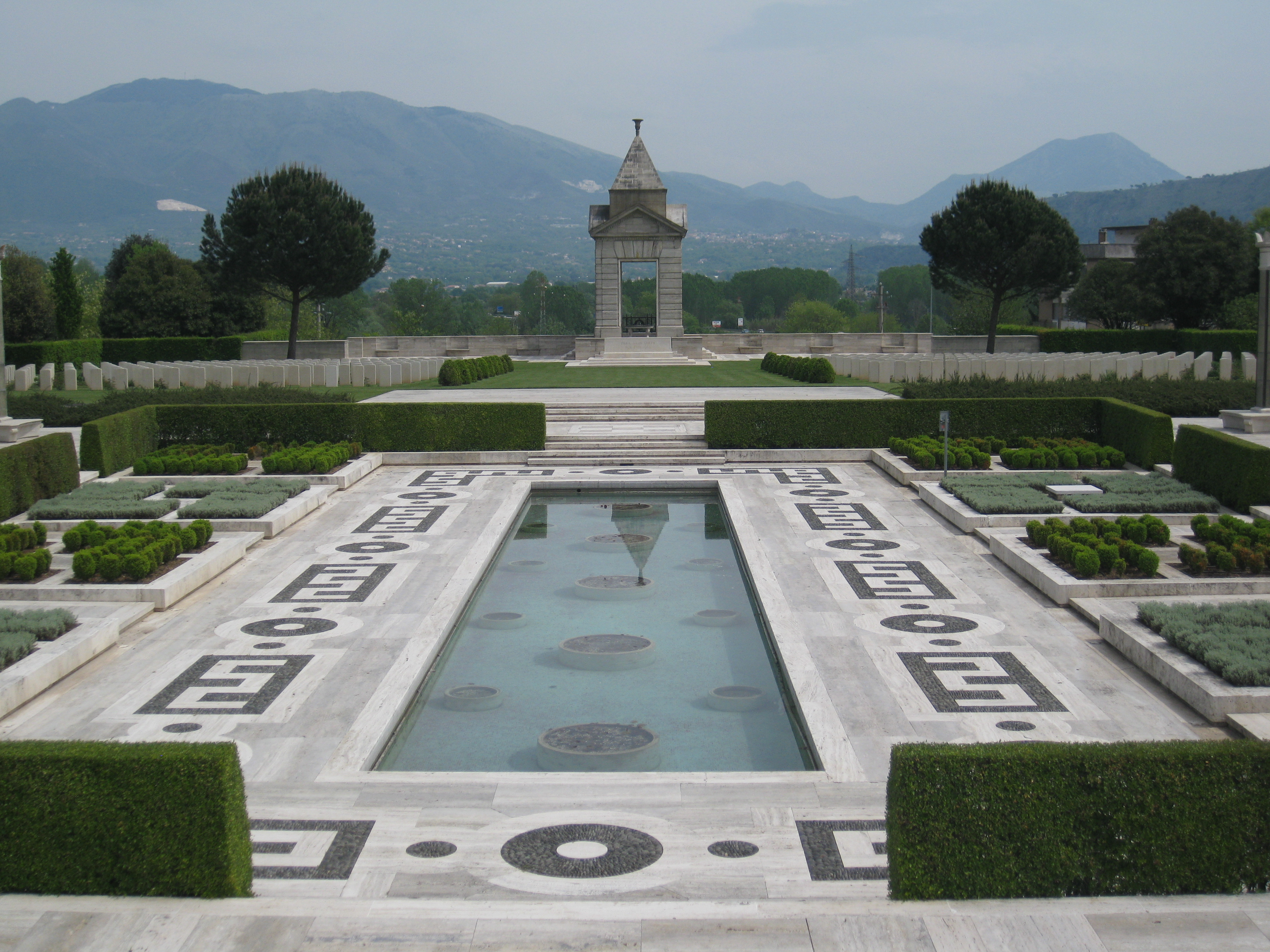
Commonwealth cemetery

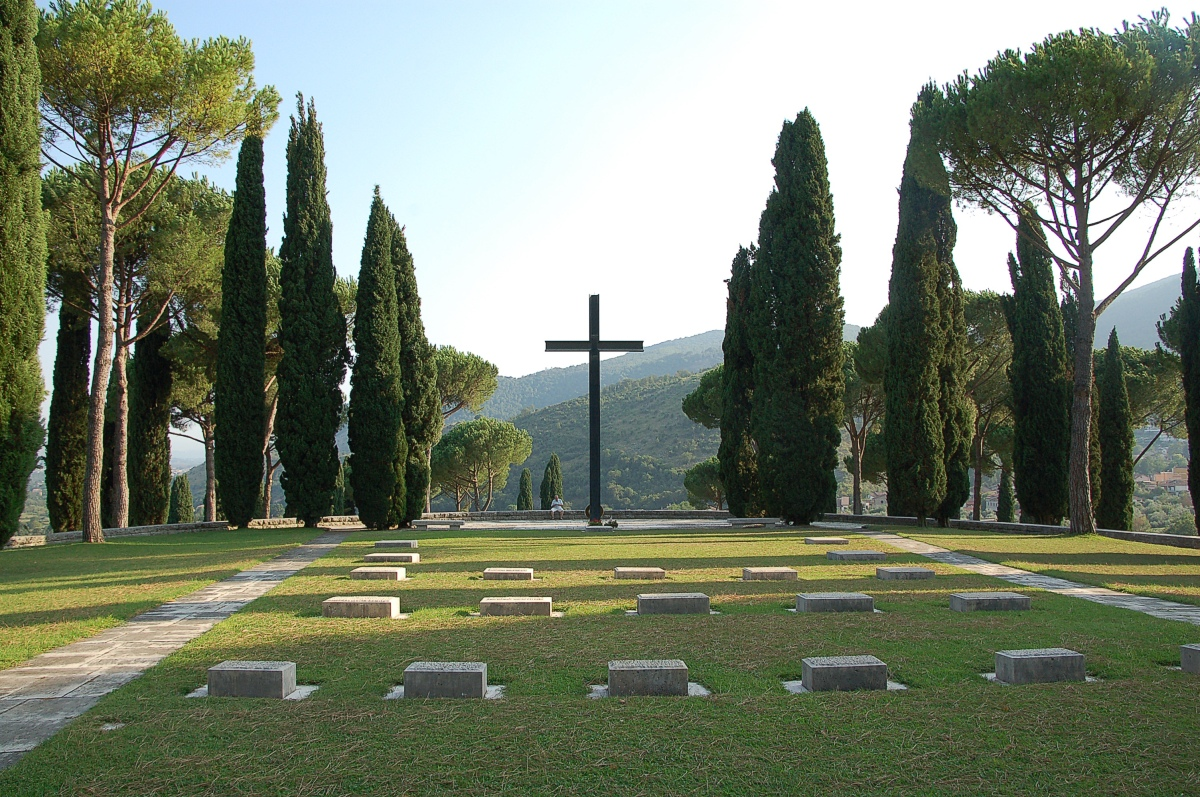
German cemetery

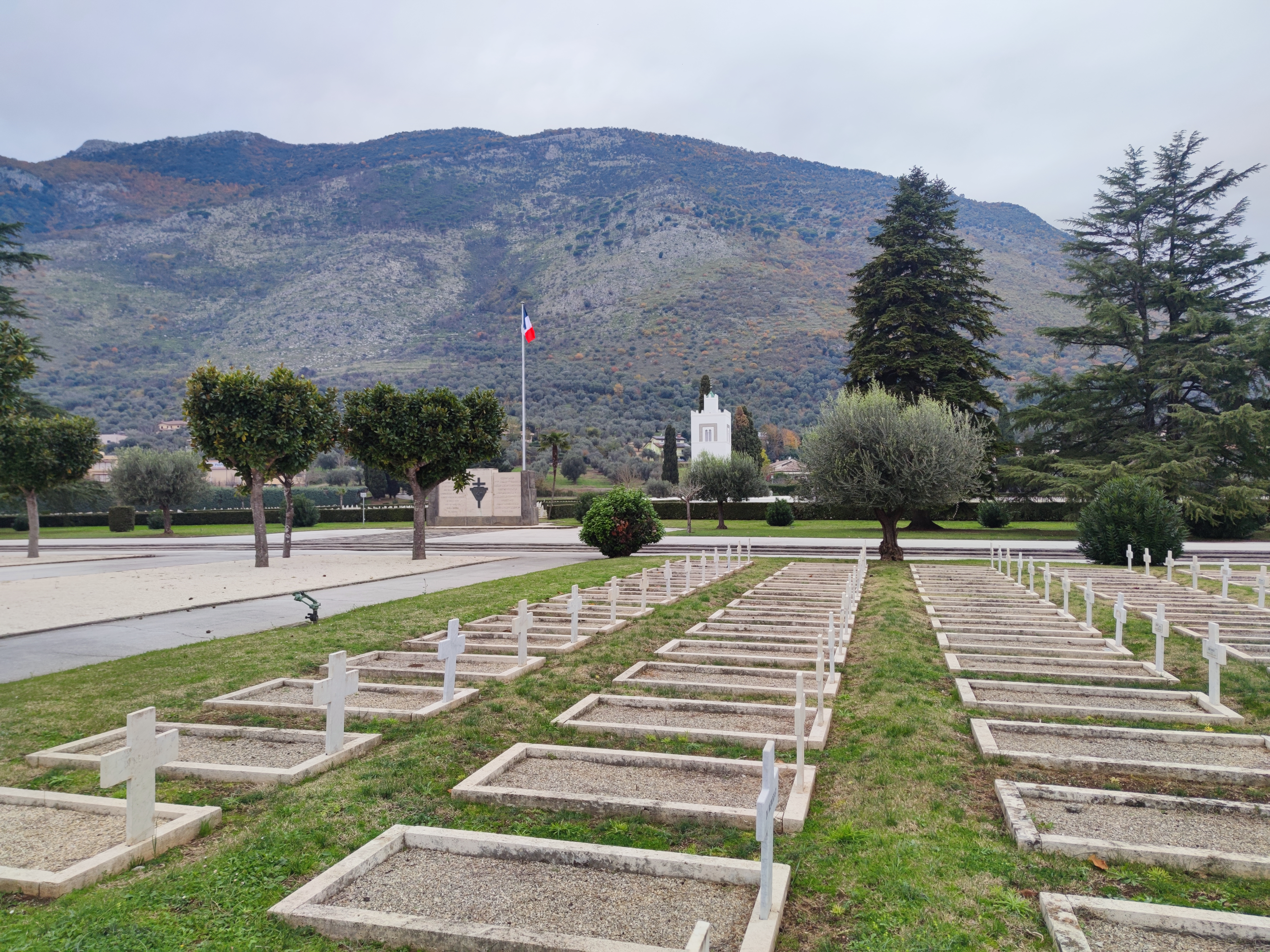
French Cemetery

Immediately after the cessation of fighting at Monte Cassino, the Polish government in exile (in London) created the Monte Cassino campaign cross to commemorate the Polish part in the capture of the strategic point. Also during this time, the Polish song writer Feliks Konarski, who had taken part in the fighting there, wrote his anthem "Czerwone maki na Monte Cassino" ("The Red Poppies on Monte Cassino"). Later, an imposing Polish cemetery was laid out; this is prominently visible from the restored monastery. The Polish cemetery is the closest of all allied cemeteries in the area, an honour given to the Poles as their units are the ones credited with the liberation of the abbey.

The Commonwealth War Graves cemetery on the western outskirts of Cassino is a burial place for British, New Zealand, Canadian, Indian, Gurkha, Australian, and South African casualties. The Italians are on Route 6 in the Liri Valley; the Americans are at the Sicily–Rome American Cemetery and Memorial in Nettuno. The French Military Cemetery, with more than 4500 graves, is located in Venafro, 15 kilometres (9.3 mi) east of Cassino.

The German cemetery (Deutsche Kriegsgräberstätte Cassino) is approximately 2 miles (3.2 km) north of Cassino in the Rapido Valley.

In the 1950s, a subsidiary of the Pontificia Commissione di Assistenza distributed Lamps of Brotherhood, cast from the bronze doors of the destroyed Abbey, to representatives of nations that had served on both sides of the war to promote reconciliation.

In 1999, a monument commemorating the Battle of Monte Cassino was unveiled in Warsaw and is located next to the street that is named after Władysław Anders.

In 2006, a memorial was unveiled in Rome honouring the Allied forces that fought and died to capture the city.

On 8 July 2021, the Chief of Army Staff, General M.M. Naravane, inaugurated the Indian Army Memorial at Cassino to commemorate the Indian soldiers killed in action during the Battle of Cassino.

== See also ==
- Barbara Line
- Battle of San Pietro Infine
- Bernhardt Line
- Cassino Band of Northumbria Army Cadet Force
- European theatre of World War II
- Wojtek (bear)

== Sources ==
- Atkinson, Rick (2007). The Day of Battle: The War in Sicily and Italy, 1943–1944. New York: Henry Holt. ISBN 978-0-8050-6289-2.
- Blaxland, Gregory (1979). Alexander's Generals (the Italian Campaign 1944–1945). London: William Kimber. ISBN 0-7183-0386-5.
- Bloch, Herbert (1979). The bombardment of Monte Cassino (February 14–16, 1944): A new appraisal. Tipografia Italo-orientale.
- Böhmler, Rudolf (1964). Monte Cassino: a German View. London: Cassell. OCLC 2752844.
- Clark, Lloyd (2006). Anzio: The Friction of War. Italy and the Battle for Rome 1944. London: Headline Publishing. ISBN 978-0-7553-1420-1.
- Cody, J.F (1956). 28 (Maori) Battalion. The Official History of New Zealand in the Second World War 1939–45. Wellington: Historical Publications Branch. OCLC 10848095.
- Davis, Norman (1982). God's playground, volume II. Columbia University Press. ISBN 0-231-05352-5.
- d'Este, Carlo (1991). Fatal Decision: Anzio and the Battle for Rome. New York: Harper. ISBN 0-06-015890-5.
- Ellis, John (2003). Cassino: The Hollow Victory: The Battle for Rome January–June 1944. Aurum Press. ISBN 1-85410-916-2.
- Forty, George (2004). Battle For Monte Cassino. Ian Allan Publishing. ISBN 0-7110-3024-3.
- Gooderson, Ian (2003). Cassino. London: Brassey's. ISBN 1-85753-324-0.
- Hapgood, David; Richardson, David (2002) [1984]. Monte Cassino: The Story of the Most Controversial Battle of World War II (reprint ed.). Cambridge Mass.: Da Capo. ISBN 0-306-81121-9.
- Hingston, W.G. (1946). The Tiger Triumphs: The Story of Three Great Divisions in Italy. HMSO for the Government of India. OCLC 29051302.
- Holland, James: Cassino '44: five months of hell in Italy. Bantam 2024 ISBN 9780857505538
- Katz, Robert (2003). The Battle for Rome. Simon & Schuster. ISBN 978-0-7432-1642-5.
- Krząstek, Tadeusz (1984). Battle of Monte Cassino, 1944. Polish Interpress Agency. OCLC 29396303.
- Laurie, Clayton D. (3 October 2003) [1994]. Rome-Arno 1944. The U.S. Army Campaigns of World War II. Washington: United States Army Center of Military History. ISBN 978-0-16-042085-6. CMH Pub 72-20. Archived from the original on 20 April 2011.
- Majdalany, Fred (1957). Cassino: Portrait of a Battle. London: Longmans, Green. OCLC 536746.
- Molony, Brigadier C.J.C.; with Flynn, Captain F.C. (R.N.); Davies, Major-General H.L. & Gleave, Group Captain T.P. (2004) [1st. pub. HMSO:1973]. Butler, Sir James (ed.). The Mediterranean and Middle East, Volume V: The Campaign in Sicily 1943 and The Campaign in Italy 3rd September 1943 to 31st March 1944. History of the Second World War, United Kingdom Military Series. Uckfield, UK: Naval & Military Press. ISBN 1-84574-069-6.
- Molony, Brigadier C.J.C.; with Flynn, Captain F.C. (R.N.); Davies, Major-General H.L. & Gleave, Group Captain T.P. (2004) [1st. pub. HMSO:1984]. Butler, Sir James (ed.). The Mediterranean and Middle East, Volume VI: Victory in the Mediterranean, Part 1 – 1st April to 4th June 1944. History of the Second World War, United Kingdom Military Series. Revised by Jackson, General Sir William. Uckfield, UK: Naval & Military Press. ISBN 1-84574-070-X.
- McGibbon, Ian, ed. (2000). The Oxford Companion to New Zealand Military History. Auckland: Oxford University Press. ISBN 0-19-558376-0.
- Muhm, Gerhard: German Tactics in the Italian Campaign
- Olson, Lynne; Cloud, Stanley (2003). A Question of Honor. Vintage. ISBN 0-375-72625-X.
- Parker, Matthew (2004). Monte Cassino: The Hardest-Fought Battle of World War II. Doubleday. ISBN 0-385-50985-5.
- Phillips, N.C. (1957). Italy Volume I: The Sangro to Cassino. Official History of New Zealand in the Second World War 1939–45. Wellington, New Zealand: War History Branch, Department of Internal Affairs. Archived from the original on 17 November 2007.
- Piekalkiewicz, Janusz (1980). Cassino: Anatomy of the Battle. London: Orbis. ISBN 9780856130212.
- Roberts, Geoffrey (1989). The Unholy Alliance. Stalin's Pact with Hitler. Indiana University Press. ISBN 0253351170. OCLC 20016390.
- Sanford, George (1999). Poland. The conquest of history. Hardwood academic publishers. ISBN 90-5702-346-6.
- Simpson, Albert F. (1983) [1951]. "Chapter 10. Anzio". In Craven, Wesley Frank; Cate, James Lea (eds.). Volume Three. Europe: Argument to V-E Day, January 1944 to May 1945. Section III – Italy. The Army Air Forces in World War II. University of Chicago Press on behalf of the Office of Airforce History. ISBN 978-0-912799-03-2. OCLC 314452493.
- Singh, Sarbans (1993). Battle Honours of the Indian Army 1757–1971. New Delhi: Vision Books. ISBN 81-7094-115-6.
- Smith, E. D. (1975). The Battles For Monte Cassino. London: Ian Allan. ISBN 0-7153-9421-5.
- Smith, Col. Kenneth V. (c. 1990). Naples-Foggia 9 September 1943–21 January 1944. U.S. Army Campaigns of World War II. Washington: United States Army Center of Military History. CMH Pub 72-17. Archived from the original on 6 September 2016.
- Squire, G.L.A.; Hill, P.G.E. (1992). The Surreys in Italy. Clandon, Surrey: The Queen's Royal Surrey Regiment Museum.
- Stefancic, David (2005). Armies in exile. Columbia University Press. ISBN 0-88033-565-3.
- Vincent, Isabel (1997). Hitler's Silent Partners: Swiss Banks, Nazi Gold and the Pursuit of Justice. William Morrow. ISBN 0688154255. OCLC 37187443.
- Whiting, Charles (1974). Hunters from the Sky, The German Parachute Corps 1940–1945. London: Leo Cooper. OCLC 43073002.

=== German ===
- Emmanuel Munding (1947): Der Untergang von Montecassino am 15. Febr. 1944. In: Zeugnis des Geistes. Gabe zum Benedictus=Jubiläum, 547–1947, Beiheft zum XXIII. Jg. der Benediktinischen Monatsschrift, Beuron: Beuroner Kunstverlag, S. 112–138.
- Katri'el Ben-Arie (1985). Die Schlacht bei Monte Cassino 1944. Freiburg im Breisgau: Rombach Verlag. ISBN 3-7930-0188-1.
- Janusz Piekałkiewicz (1997). Die Schlacht von Monte Cassino. Zwanzig Völker ringen um einen Berg. Augsburg: Bechtermünz Verlag. ISBN 3-86047-909-1.
- Heinz Konsalik (2004). Sie fielen vom Himmel. Klagenfurt: Kaiser. ISBN 3-7043-1329-7.

=== Italian ===
- Gerhard Muhm, La tattica tedesca nella campagna d'Italia, in Linea gotica avamposto dei Balcani, a cura di Amedeo Montemaggi – Edizioni Civitas, Roma 1993
- Dal Volturno a Cassino, Le vicende, i luoghi e gli uomini che hanno segnato gli otto mesi più sanguinosi della Campagna d'Italia. (in Italian)

=== Polish ===
- Adam Franciszek Studzinski (1998). Wspomnienia kapelana Pulku 4 Pancernego "Skorpion" spod Monte Cassino. K & Z. ISBN 8386171049.
- Melchior Wańkowicz (1993). Szkice spod Monte Cassino. Wiedza Powszechna. ISBN 83-214-0913-X.
- Melchior Wańkowicz (1989). Bitwa o Monte Cassino. Warsaw: Wydawnictwa MON. ISBN 83-11-07651-0.
- Melchior Wańkowicz (1990). Monte Cassino. Warsaw: PAX. ISBN 83-211-1388-5.
- Monte Cassino: historia, ludzie, pamięć [Monte Cassino: history, people, memory] (in Polish). Askon. 2000. ISBN 83-87545-25-2.
- Monte Cassino. Warsaw: Askon. 2004. ISBN 83-87545-80-5.
- Janusz Piekałkiewicz (2003). Monte Cassino. Agencja Wydawnicza Morex. ISBN 83-7250-078-9.
- Zbigniew Wawer (1994). Monte Cassino 1944. Bellona. ISBN 83-11-08311-8.
