= Jerzy Braun (writer) =

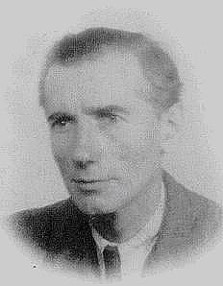
Jerzy Braun, before 1945

Jerzy Bronisław Braun, ps. "Bronisław Rogowski" (born September 1, 1901, in Dąbrowa Tarnowska, died October 17, 1975, in Rome) was a Polish writer, political activist, poet, playwright, literary critic, columnist, screenwriter, philosopher, scout, the last chairman of the Council of National Unity (from March to July 1945), and the last Government Delegate for Poland from June 1945.
