= Cassino Band of Northumbria Army Cadet Force =

- The band playing outside Monte Cassino, 2006
- Active: 2000-Present
- Country: United Kingdom
- Branch: Army Cadet Force
- Type: Military band
- Motto: Inspire to Achieve
- March: Quick - The British Grenadiers; Quick - Blaydon Races; Slow - Rule Britannia
- Anniversaries: Saint George's Day (23 April), Minden (1 August)

Insignia
- Hackle: Red over White; From Royal Northumberland Fusiliers

The Cassino Band of Northumbria Army Cadet Force is a military band of the Army Cadet Force (ACF) in Northumbria.

The band was formed in 2000, by George Morrison and consisted of Cadets from various cadet detachments in the Northumbria ACF's catchment area. As with all infantry bands, the Cassino Band takes its name from a battle honour. George chose the Battle of Monte Cassino as troops from all of the local regiments in the North East of England fought in it. It is in their name that band plays to this very day.

It is a Voluntary Organisation sponsored by the Ministry of Defence and the Army. The band performs in many different locations. In the past it has played in Germany, The Federation Brewery, Eden Camp and more recently it has performed at the prestigious Berwick Tattoo. The Band has also recently been on a tour of Italy in order to play a retreat in honour of the place from which the band takes its name, Monte Cassino.

The Band started as a Corps of Drums containing only fifes and drums but it soon evolved into a full military band boasting not only a Corps of Drums and Military Band but also its own Bugle Platoon.

As with all youth organisations it is totally dependent upon new members joining and is therefore open to all who wish to come and play with the band regardless of experience.
