= Jan Piekałkiewicz =

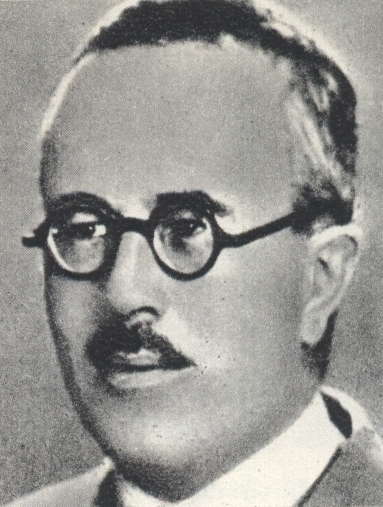
Jan Piekałkiewicz.

Jan Piekałkiewicz (19 September 1892 – 19 February 1943) was a Polish economist and statistician, politician and the Polish Underground State's Government Delegate.

== Biography ==
Jan Piekałkiewicz was born on the 19 September 1892 in Kursk, to a Polish intelligentsia family. He studied in St. Petersburg and in Poznań.

He was an employee of the Central Statistical Office, and was one of the organizers of the Polish census of 1921. From 1923 to 1924 he was a professor at the University of Lviv. From 1924 to 1939 he lectured in the Main Political School in Warsaw, and published over 50 works on finances, economics (in particular, econometrics) and statistics. He was a member of the Polish Statistical Society, and in 1927 he became a member of the International Statistical Institute. He worked with the Statistical Commission of the League of Nations. He was considered a leading Polish expert on economical statistics.

He was a member of the Polish People's Party "Piast" (PSL "Piast", from 1926) and People's Party (Stronnictwo Ludowe, from 1931). From 1938 to 1939 he was a member of the Main Council of the People's Party. Following the German invasion of Poland, from 1940 he was a member of the underground arm of the People's Party, the People's Party "Roch" (Stronnictwo Ludowe "Roch"). In December 1940 he became Deputy to the Polish Underground State's Government Delegate and on 2 August (or 17 September - sources vary) 1942 he replaced Cyryl Ratajski as Delegate.

As Delegate, he confirmed the creation of the Council to Aid Jews Żegota and extension of full aid to Polish political prisoners. He also ordered the full documentation of the Nazi crimes against ethnic Poles and the Jews. He informed the Western Allies about the Holocaust. He supported the studies on the creation of the post-war Polish-German border on Lusatian Neisse and Oder. In his speeches to the nation, published in Biuletyn Informacyjny, he called up everyone to join in the civil struggles and warned collaborators that they faced the death penalty for betraying the Polish nation. He also wanted to establish cooperation between the Polish Underground State, loyal to the Polish government in exile in London, and the communist Polish Workers Party (PPR). As Delegate, he was succeeded by Jan Stanisław Jankowski.

He was arrested by the Germans on 19 February 1943, tortured, then murdered on 19 June 1943.

In 1995 he was posthumously awarded the Order of the White Eagle.

== Works ==
- Atlas statystyczny Polski, with Ignacy Weinfeld and Edward Szturm de Sztrem, tome 1 in 1924, tome 2 in 1925
- O programie gospodarczym Polski, with Brunon Balukiewicz
- La Pologne contemporaine : atlas statistique, 1926
- Bilans płatniczy polski = La Balance des payements de la Pologne, 1926
- Okrȩgi gospodarcze Polski : Les régions économiques de la Pologne, 1927
- Długi samorządu terytorjalnego = Les dettes des administrations autonomes territoriales, 1929
- Le service statistique des banques de crédit agricole hypothécaire, 1931
- La statistique de l'activité économique des entreprises d'état, 1933
- Statistique du crédit hypothécaire, 1933
- Sprawozdanie z badań skladu ludności robotniczej w Polsce metoda̜ reprezentacyjna̜, 1934

== See also ==
- Janusz Piekałkiewicz, nephew
