= List of Government Delegates for Poland =

The following were the Government Delegates for Poland (Delegat Rządu na Kraj) during World War II:

- Cyryl Ratajski (Wartski)— November 1939 (officially, from December 1940) – August 1942; died October 19, 1943.
- Jan Piekałkiewicz (Juliański)—until February 19, 1943; arrested by the Gestapo, and killed in the Pawiak prison on June 19, 1943.
- Jan Stanisław Jankowski (Sobol)—until February 1945; arrested by the NKVD on February 28, 1945, tried in the Trial of the Sixteen, and killed in a Soviet prison on February 13, 1953.
- Stefan Korboński (Zieliński)—until June 1945. Emigrated, and died on April 23, 1989.
- Jerzy Braun-from June 1945; arrested in 1948; emigrated in 1965 to Italy.

The above Delegates were officially administering the General Government from an office in Warsaw, but eventually they ended administering the entire occupied Poland, as posts for Delegates for territories annexed to Germany and territories annexed to the Soviet Union were not able to develop properly.

- Adolf Bniński was the Delegate for the territories annexed by Germany; he held this position from December 1940 till his arrest in July 1941
- Leon Mikołajczyk was Bniński's successor; after his arrest, in February 1942 the Delegate Office in Poznań lost its status as an independent office and became administered by the Warsaw office
- Władysław Zych was the acting Delegate for the Soviet occupied territories (he was never officially confirmed in this position by the Polish government in exile)

== See also ==
- Government Delegation for Poland
- Armed Forces Delegation for Poland
