= Janusz Piekałkiewicz =

Polish historian (1925–1988)

Janusz Piekałkiewicz (1925 – March 9, 1988) was a Polish underground soldier, historian, writer, as well as a television and cinema director and producer. He was an author on many aspects of World War II history. He wrote from his experiences during the war and specialized in detailing operations within the secret services. In addition to his well-known history books, he also wrote books about treasure hunting.

== In homeland ==
Piekałkiewicz was born in Warsaw, Poland. His uncle was professor Jan Piekałkiewicz, a leader of the Polish resistance, who was murdered by the Gestapo in 1943. At the age of seventeen, Janusz joined the Armia Krajowa (the Home Army), later participated in the Warsaw Uprising, and spent the remainder of the war in the Sachsenhausen concentration camp. After graduating from high school in 1946, he began studies at the National Film School in Łódź, in the Film Production Department. He also studied contemporary history. After three years, he was barred from continuing studies, because he was a dissident and did not subscribe to the official views of the government. Barring further studies because of this was also known as for political reasons. He then worked as an assistant producer and wrote screenplays for popular science films, which also did not have a chance to be made because of political reasons. His passion was the Tatra Mountains, therefore, he moved to Zakopane and worked as a mountaineering guide.

== As émigré ==
Deciding to emigrate from Poland in 1956, he escaped his homeland by tracing the route used by underground resistance couriers during World War II through the Tatra Mountains. He arrived in Hungary in time for the Revolution of 1956 and became actively involved. After Soviet armed forces crushed the rebellion, he fled to Austria and was briefly detained. He worked as a laborer on road construction. Later, Piekalkiewicz became a broadcast reporter in Vienna. He then worked in Paris, London, and Germany as a television producer, as well as a writer and director for films.

His 26-episode television serial, "Secret Agents, Spies, and Saboteurs – Famous Undercover Missions of World War II" (Szpiedzy, agenci, żołnierze – tajne jednostki okresu II wojny światowej"), earned first-place (Golden Nymph) at the IX International Festival de Télévision de Monte-Carlo in 1969. This series was distinguished by its accuracy, objectiveness, as well as its serious and thoughtful delivery. He finally received the award after eleven years. His book of the same title is described as "one of the most interesting and comprehensive spy books done on WWII". In June 1964, he presented "Polnische Passion" (Polish Passion – International and English title) as a documentary film at the 1964 Berlin International Film Festival.

It was only after 1990, and the collapse of the communist government in Poland (see: History of Poland), that his books were translated from German into Polish and finally published in his homeland. In 1997, Film Studio Wir shot a documentary film about him for the public Polish Television TVP 1 (Program I).

== Selected books in English ==
All of his works were originally published in German.

- Piekalkiewicz, Janusz (translated by Francisca Garvie and Nadia Fowler) (1973). Secret agents, spies, and saboteurs; famous undercover missions of World War II. William Morrow & Co. ASIN: B000J0R9UU.
- Piekalkiewicz, Janusz (translated by H. A. Barker and Arthur J. Barker) (1977). Arnhem 1944. Ian Allan. ISBN 978-0-7110-0826-7.
- Piekalkiewicz, Janusz (translated by Michaela Nierhaus) (1987). Operation "Citadel": Kursk and Orel: The Greatest Tank Battle of the Second World War. Presidio Press. ISBN 978-0-89141-254-0.
- Piekalkiewicz, Janusz (1980). Cavalry of World War II. Stein and Day. ISBN 978-0-8128-2749-1.
- Piekalkiewicz, Janusz (translated by Jan Van Heurck) (1986). Tank War, 1939–1945. Blandford Press. ISBN 978-0-7137-1666-5.
- Piekalkiewicz, Janusz (translated by Peter Spurgeon) (1987). Sea War, 1939–1945. Historical Times Inc. ISBN 978-0-7137-1665-8.
- Piekalkiewicz, Janusz (translated by Fred Clemens) (1992). Rommel and the Secret War in North Africa, 1941–1943: Secret Intelligence in the North African Campaign. Schiffer Military History. ISBN 978-0-88740-340-8.
- Piekalkiewicz, Janusz (translated by Jan Van Heurck) (1985). The Air War, 1939–1945. Schiffer Military History. ISBN 978-0-918678-05-8.
- Piekalkiewicz, Janusz (1991). BMW Motorcycles in World War II: R12/R75. Schiffer Military History. ISBN 978-0-88740-306-4.
- Piekalkiewicz, Janusz (translated by Edward Force) (1992). The German 88 Gun in Combat: The Scourge of Allied Armor. Schiffer Military History. ISBN 978-0-88740-341-5.
- Piekalkiewicz, Janusz (translated by Jan Van Heurck) (1987). Cassino: Anatomy of the Battle. Historical Times Inc. ISBN 978-0-918678-32-4.
- Piekalkiewicz, Janusz (translated by Dr. Edward Force) (2008). The German National Railway in World War II. Schiffer Publishing, Altglen, PA. ISBN 978-0-7643-3097-1.
