= Occupation of Poland (1939–1945) =

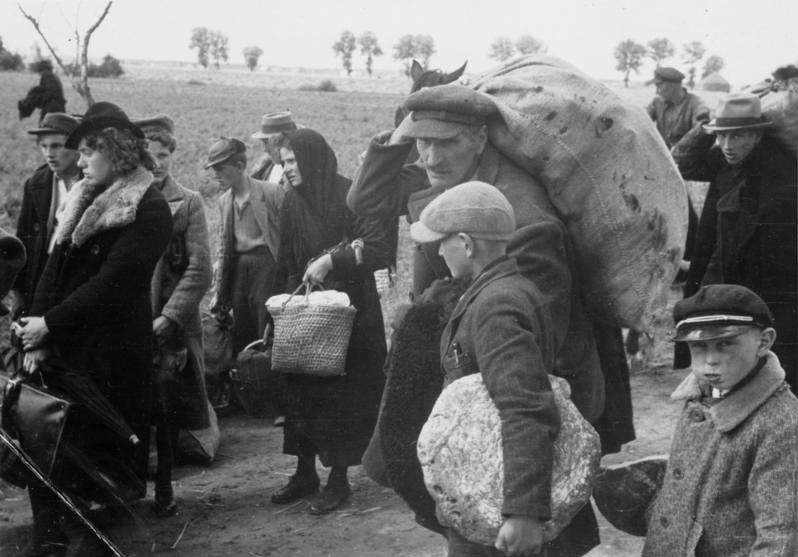
- Beginning of Lebensraum, the German expulsion of Poles from western Poland, 1939

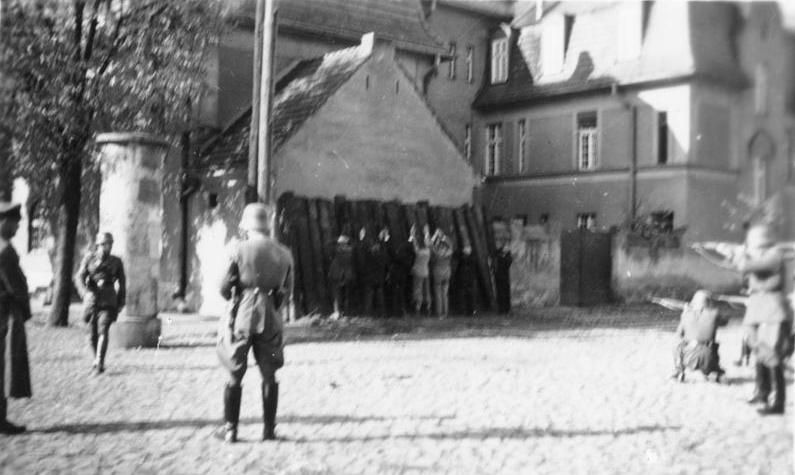
- Operation Tannenberg, October 1939, mass murder of Polish townsmen in western Poland
- 1939–1941
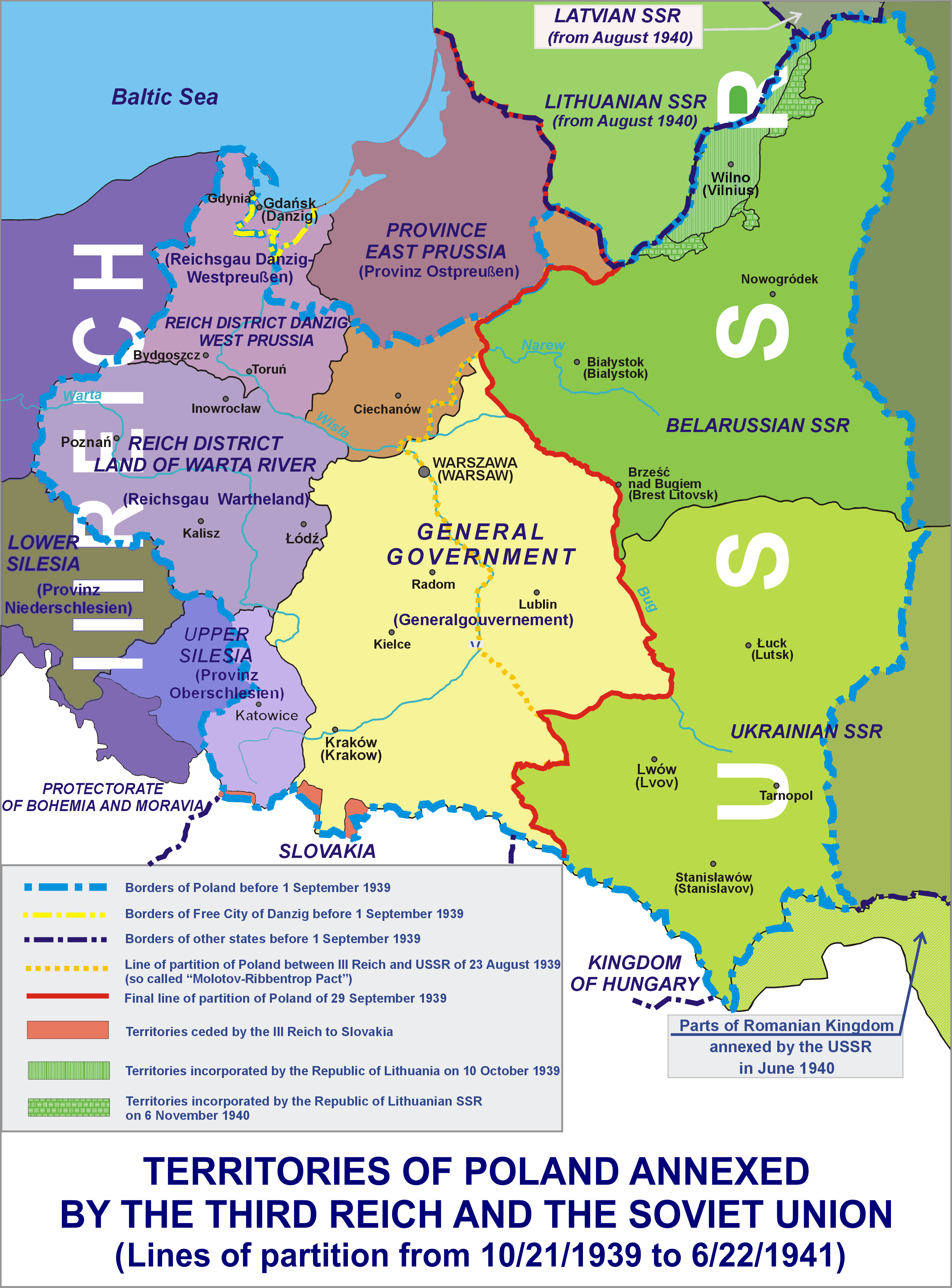
- Fourth Partition of Poland – aftermath of the Molotov–Ribbentrop Pact; division of Polish territories in the years 1939–1941 prior to the Operation Barbarossa, German invasion of the Soviet Union in 1941
- 1941–1945
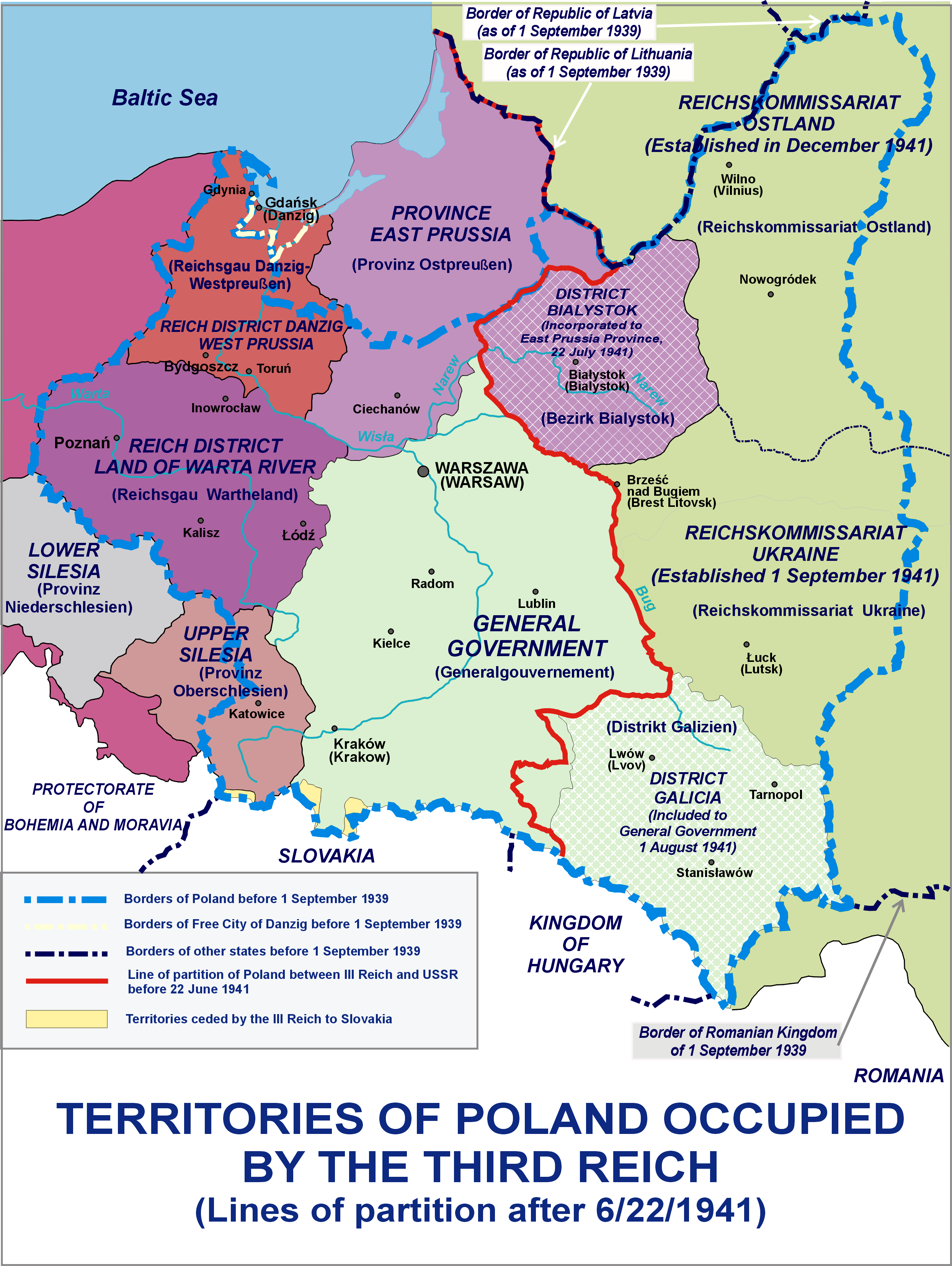
- Changes in administration of occupied Polish territories following German invasion of the Soviet Union in 1941. The map shows district divisions in 1944

General Government Soviet/German occupation of Poland
- Soviet & German military occupation
- 1939/1941–1945
- Flag Coat of arms
- Capital: Warsaw
- Government
  - Type: Civil/Military administration
- Historical era: Second World War
  - Established: 30 September 1939/1941
  - Disestablished: 19 January 1945
Preceded by	Succeeded by
Second Polish Republic	Provisional Government of Poland

During World War II, Poland was occupied by Nazi Germany and the Soviet Union (as well as Slovakia) following the invasion in September 1939. The German occupation ended with the defeat of Germany by the Allies in May 1945. Throughout the entire course of the occupation, the territory of Poland was divided between Nazi Germany and the Soviet Union (USSR), both of which intended to eradicate Poland's culture and subjugate its people. In the summer-autumn of 1941, the lands which were annexed by the Soviets were overrun by Germany in the course of the initially successful German attack on the USSR. After a few years of fighting, the Red Army drove the German forces out of the USSR and crossed into Poland from the rest of Central and Eastern Europe.

Sociologist Tadeusz Piotrowski argues that both occupying powers were hostile to the existence of Poland's sovereignty, people, and the culture and aimed to destroy them. Before Operation Barbarossa, Germany and the Soviet Union coordinated their Poland-related policies, most visibly in the four Gestapo–NKVD conferences, where the occupiers discussed their plans to deal with the Polish resistance movement.

Around six million Polish citizens—nearly 21.4% of Poland's population—died between 1939 and 1945 as a result of the occupation, half of whom were ethnic Poles and the other half of whom were Polish Jews. Over 90% of the deaths were non-military losses, because most civilians were deliberately targeted in various actions which were launched by the Germans and Soviets. Overall, during German occupation of pre-war Polish territory, 1939–1945, the Germans murdered 5,470,000–5,670,000 Poles, including 3,000,000 Jews in what was described during the Nuremberg trials as a deliberate and systematic genocide.

In August 2009, the Polish Institute of National Remembrance (IPN) researchers estimated Poland's dead (including Polish Jews) at between 5.47 and 5.67 million (due to German actions) and 150,000 (due to Soviet), or around 5.62 and 5.82 million total.

== Administration ==
In September 1939, Poland was invaded and occupied by two powers: Nazi Germany and the Soviet Union, acting in accordance with the Molotov–Ribbentrop Pact. Germany acquired 48.4% of the former Polish territory. Under the terms of two decrees by Hitler, with Stalin's agreement (8 and 12 October 1939), large areas of western Poland were annexed by Germany. The size of these annexed territories was approximately 92,500 square kilometres (35,700 sq mi) with approximately 10.5 million inhabitants. The remaining block of territory, of about the same size and inhabited by about 11.5 million, was placed under a German administration called the General Government (in German: Generalgouvernement für die besetzten polnischen Gebiete, "General Governorate for the Occupied Polish Region"), with its capital at Kraków. A German lawyer and prominent Nazi, Hans Frank, was appointed Governor-General of this occupied area on 12 October 1939. Most of the administration outside strictly local level was replaced by German officials. Non-German population on the occupied lands were subject to forced resettlement, Germanization, economic exploitation, and slow but progressive extermination.

A small strip of land, about 700 square kilometres (270 sq mi) with 200,000 inhabitants that had been part of Czechoslovakia before 1938, was ceded by Germany to its ally, Slovakia.

Poles comprised an overwhelming majority the population of the territories that came under the control of Germany, in contrast the areas annexed by the Soviet Union contained a diverse array of peoples, the population being split into bilingual provinces, some of which had large ethnic Ukrainian and Belarusian minorities, many of whom welcomed the Soviets due in part to communist agitation by Soviet emissaries. Nonetheless, Poles still comprised a plurality of the population in all territories annexed by the Soviet Union.

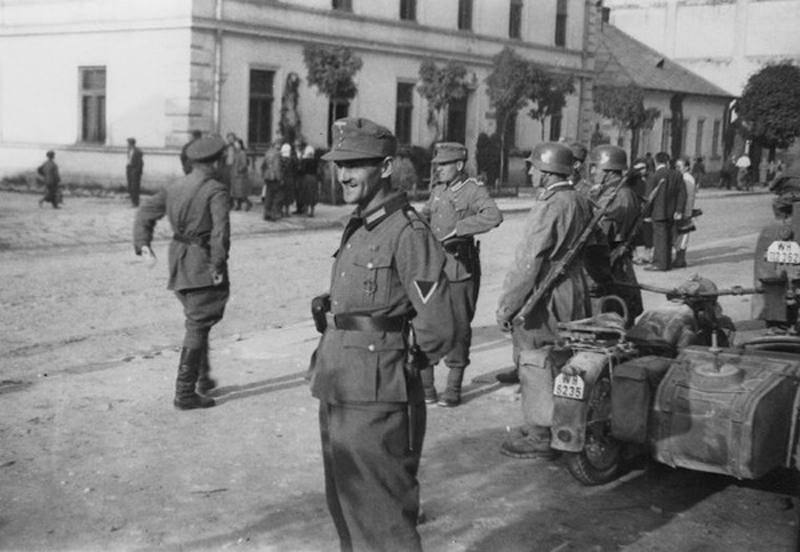
German and Soviet soldiers stroll around Sambir after the German-Soviet invasion of Poland.

By the end of the invasion, the Soviet Union had taken over 51.6% of the territory of Poland (about 201,000 square kilometres (78,000 sq mi)), with over 13,200,000 people. The ethnic composition of these areas was as follows: 38% Poles (≈5.1 million people), 37% Ukrainians, 14.5% Belarusians, 8.4% Jews, 0.9% Russians, and 0.6% Germans. There were also 336,000 refugees, mostly Jews (198,000), who fled from areas occupied by Germany. All territory invaded by the Red Army was annexed to the Soviet Union (after a rigged election), and split between the Belarusian SSR and the Ukrainian SSR, with the exception of the Wilno area taken from Poland, which was transferred to sovereign Lithuania for several months and subsequently annexed by the Soviet Union in the form of the Lithuanian SSR on 3 August 1940. Following the German invasion of the Soviet Union in 1941, most of the Polish territories annexed by the Soviets were attached to the enlarged General Government. The end of the war saw the USSR occupy all of Poland and most of eastern Germany. The Soviets gained recognition of their pre-1941 annexations of Polish territory; as compensation, substantial portions of eastern Germany were ceded to Poland, whose borders were significantly shifted westwards.

== Treatment of Polish citizens under German occupation ==
=== Generalplan Ost, Lebensraum and expulsion of Poles ===
For months prior to the beginning of World War II in 1939, German newspapers and leaders had carried out a national and international propaganda campaign accusing Polish authorities of organizing or tolerating violent ethnic cleansing of ethnic Germans living in Poland. British ambassador Sir H. Kennard sent four statements in August 1939 to Viscount Halifax regarding Hitler's claims about the treatment Germans were receiving in Poland; he came to the conclusion all the claims by Hitler and the Nazis were exaggerations or false claims.

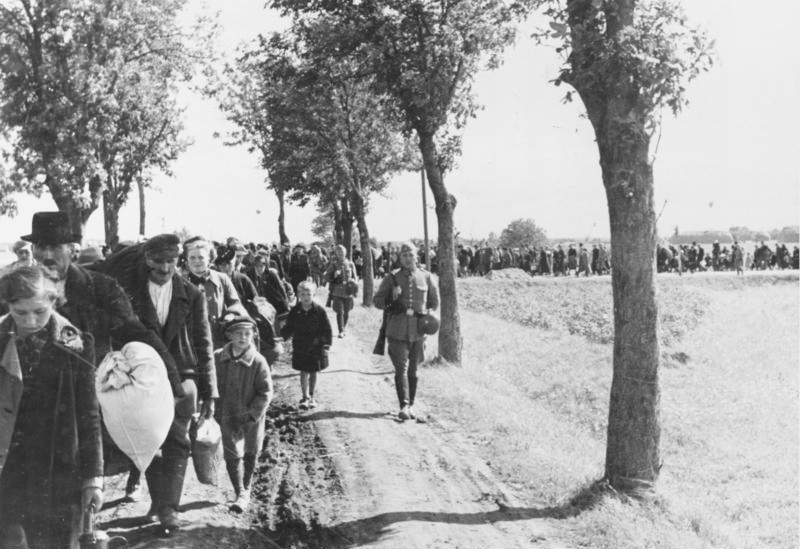
Expulsion of Poles from western Poland, with Poles led to the trains under German army escort, 1939.

From the beginning, the invasion of Poland by Nazi Germany was intended as fulfilment of the future plan of the German Reich described by Adolf Hitler in his book Mein Kampf as Lebensraum ("living space") for the Germans in Central and Eastern Europe. The goal of the occupation was to turn the former territory of Poland into ethnically German "living space", by deporting and exterminating the non-German population, or relegating it to the status of slave laborers. The goal of the German state under Nazi leadership during the war was the complete destruction of the Polish people and nation. The fate of the Polish people, as well as the fate of many other Slavs, was outlined in the genocidal Generalplan Ost (General Plan for the East) and the closely related Generalsiedlungsplan (General Plan for Settlement). Over a period of 30 years, approximately 12.5 million Germans would be resettled in the Slavic areas, including Poland; with some versions of the plan requiring the resettlement of at least 100 million Germans over a century. The Slavic inhabitants of those lands would be eliminated as the result of genocidal policies; and the survivors would be resettled further east, in less hospitable areas of Eurasia, beyond the Ural Mountains, such as Siberia. At the plan's fulfillment, no Slavs or Jews would remain in Central and Eastern Europe. Generalplan Ost, essentially a grand plan to commit ethnic cleansing, was divided into two parts, the Kleine Planung ("Small Plan"), covered actions which would be undertaken during the war, and the Grosse Planung ("Big Plan"), covered actions which would be undertaken after the war was won. The plan envisaged that different percentages of the various conquered nations would undergo Germanization, be expelled and deported to the depths of Russia, and suffer other gruesome fates, including purposeful starvation and murder, the net effect of which would ensure that the conquered territories would take on an irrevocably German character. Over a longer period of time, only about 3–4 million Poles, all of whom were considered suitable for Germanization, would be allowed to reside in the former territory of Poland.

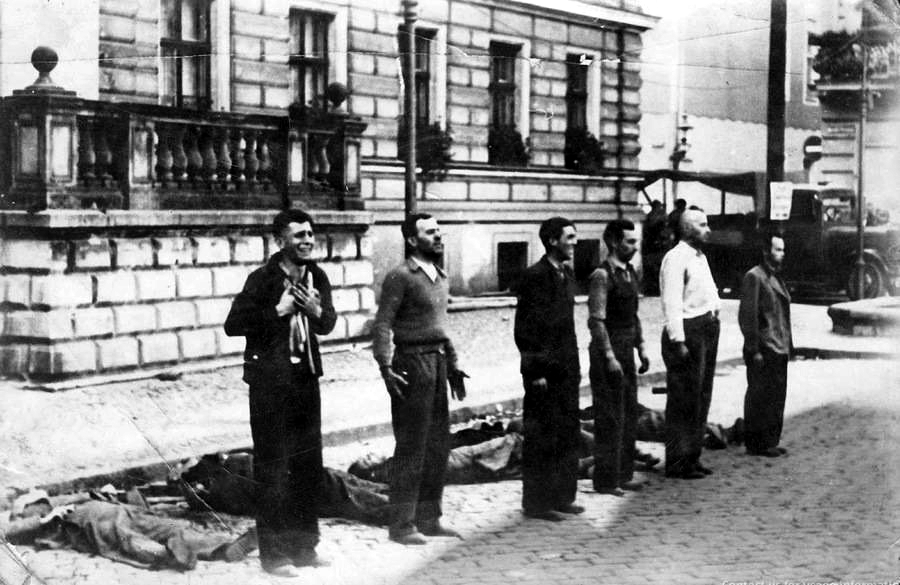
Public execution of Polish civilians randomly caught in a street roundup in German-occupied Bydgoszcz, September 1939

Those plans began to be implemented almost immediately after German troops took control of Poland. As early as October 1939, many Poles were expelled from the annexed lands in order to make room for German colonizers. Only those Poles who had been selected for Germanization, approximately 1.7 million including thousands of children who had been taken from their parents, were permitted to remain, and if they resisted it, they were to be sent to concentration camps, because "German blood must not be utilized in the interest of a foreign nation". By the end of 1940, at least 325,000 Poles from annexed lands were forced to abandon most of their property and forcibly resettled in the General Government district. There were numerous fatalities among the very young and very old, many of whom either perished en route or perished in makeshift transit camps such as those in the towns of Potulice, Smukal, and Toruń. The expulsions continued in 1941, with another 45,000 Poles forced to move eastwards, but following the German invasion of the Soviet Union, the expulsions slowed down, as more and more trains were diverted for military logistics, rather than being made available for population transfers. Nonetheless, in late 1942 and 1943, large-scale expulsions also took place in the General Government, affecting at least 110,000 Poles in the Zamość–Lublin region. Tens of thousands of the expelled, with no place to go, were simply imprisoned in the Auschwitz (Oświęcim) and Majdanek concentration camps. By 1942, the number of new German arrivals in pre-war Poland had already reached two million.

The Nazi plans also called for Poland's 3.3 million Jews to be exterminated; the non-Jewish majority's extermination was planned for the long term and initiated through the mass murder of its political, religious, and intellectual elites at first, which was meant to make the formation of any organized top-down resistance more difficult. Further, the populace of occupied territories was to be relegated to the role of an unskilled labour-force for German-controlled industry and agriculture. This was in spite of racial theory that falsely regarded most Polish leaders as actually being of "German blood", and partly because of it, on the grounds that German blood must not be used in the service of a foreign nation.

After Germany lost the war, the International Military Tribunal at the Nuremberg Trials and Poland's Supreme National Tribunal concluded that the aim of German policies in Poland – the extermination of Poles and Jews – had "all the characteristics of genocide in the biological meaning of this term."

==== German People's List ====
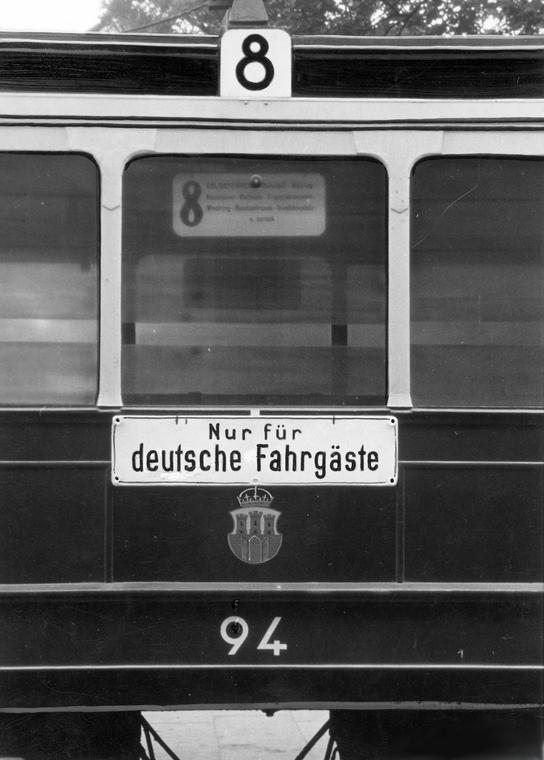
Nur für Deutsche ("For Germans only") sign, on Kraków line-8 streetcar

The German People's List (Deutsche Volksliste) classified the willing Polish citizens into four groups of people with ethnic Germanic heritage. Group One included so-called ethnic Germans who had taken an active part in the struggle for the Germanization of Poland. Group Two included those ethnic Germans who had not taken such an active part, but had "preserved" their German characteristics. Group Three included individuals of alleged German stock who had become "Polonized", but whom it was believed, could be won back to Germany. This group also included persons of non-German descent married to Germans or members of non-Polish groups who were considered desirable for their political attitude and racial characteristics. Group Four consisted of persons of German stock who had become politically merged with the Poles.

After registration in the List, individuals from Groups One and Two automatically became German citizens. Those from Group Three acquired German citizenship subject to revocation. Those from Group Four received German citizenship through naturalization proceedings; resistance to Germanization constituted treason because "German blood must not be utilized in the interest of a foreign nation," and such people were sent to concentration camps. Persons ineligible for the List were classified as stateless, and all Poles from the occupied territory, that is from the Government General of Poland, as distinct from the incorporated territory, were classified as non-protected.

=== Encouraging ethnic strife ===
According to the 1931 Polish census, out of a prewar population of 35 million, 66% spoke the Polish language as their mother tongue, and most of the Polish native speakers were Roman Catholics. With regards to the remainder, 15% were Ukrainians, 8.5% Jews, 4.7% Belarusians, and 2.2% Germans. Germans intended to exploit the fact that the Second Polish Republic was an ethnically diverse territory, and their policy aimed to "divide and conquer" the ethnically diverse population of the occupied Polish territory, to prevent any unified resistance from forming. One of the attempts to divide the Polish nation was a creation of a new ethnicity called "Goralenvolk". Some minorities, like Kashubians, were forcefully enrolled into the Deutsche Volksliste, as a measure to compensate for the losses in the Wehrmacht (unlike Poles, Deutsche Volksliste members were eligible for military conscription). In addition, Germans encouraged Ukrainians and Poles to kill each other during the Volyn massacre.

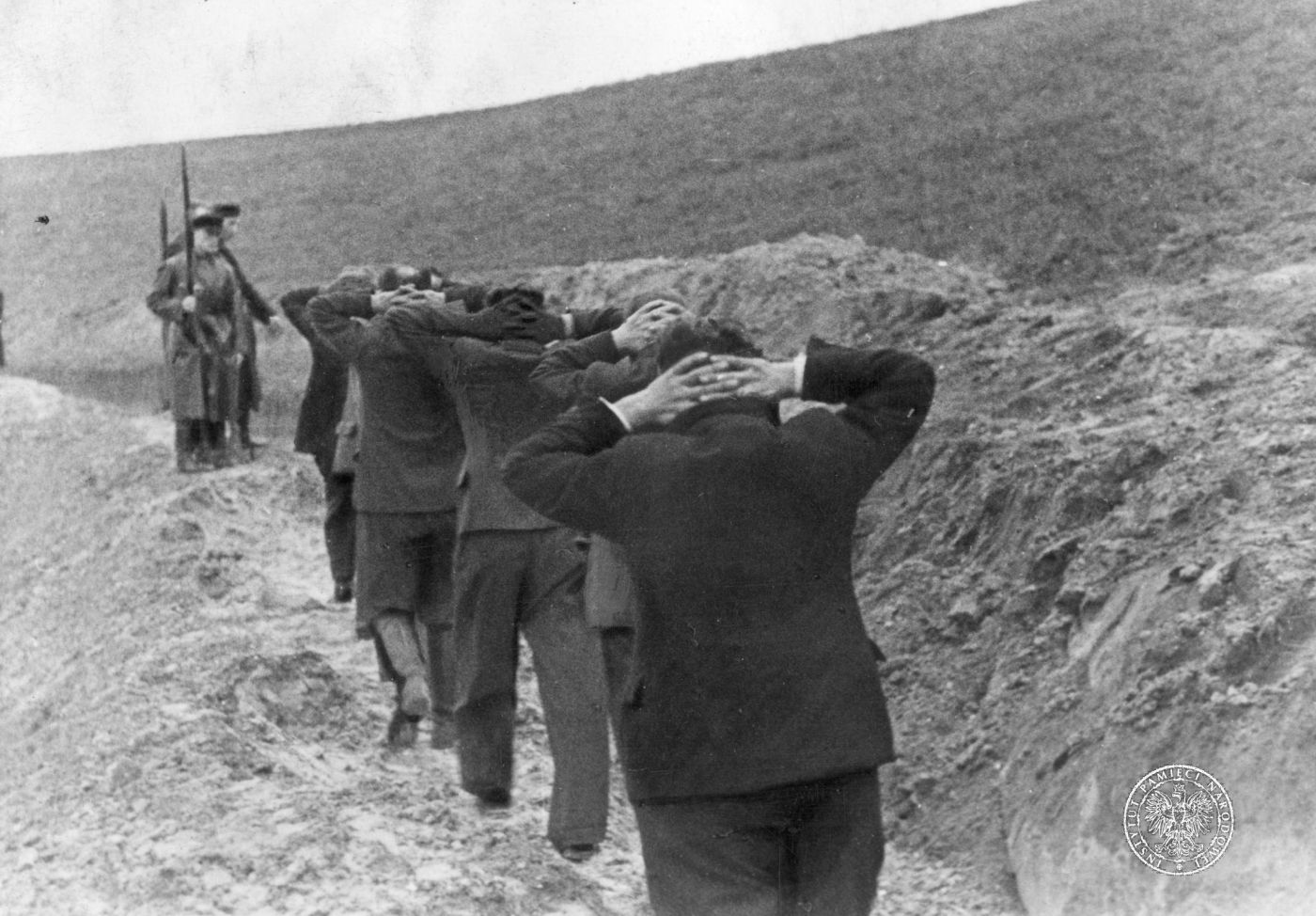
Polish teachers guarded by members of ethnic German Selbstschutz battalion before execution

In a top-secret memorandum, "The Treatment of Racial Aliens in the East", dated 25 May 1940, Heinrich Himmler, head of the Schutzstaffel (SS), wrote: "We need to divide the East's different ethnic groups up into as many parts and splinter groups as possible".

=== Forced labour ===
Almost immediately after the invasion, Germans began forcibly conscripting laborers. Jews were drafted to repair war damage as early as October, with women and children 12 or older required to work; shifts could take half a day and with little compensation. The labourers, Jews, Poles and others, were employed in SS-owned enterprises (such as the German Armament Works, Deutsche Ausrustungswerke, DAW), but also in many private German firms – such as Messerschmitt, Junkers, Siemens, and IG Farben.

Forced labourers were subject to harsh discriminatory measures. Announced on 8 March 1940 was the Polish decrees which were used as a legal basis for foreign labourers in Germany. The decrees required Poles to wear identifying purple P's on their clothing, made them subject to a curfew, and banned them from using public transportation as well as many German "cultural life" centres and "places of amusement" (this included churches and restaurants). Sexual relations between Germans and Poles were forbidden as Rassenschande (race defilement) under penalty of death. To keep them segregated from the German population, they were often housed in segregated barracks behind barbed wire. Nonetheless, many Polish women were sexually enslaved in German camp and military brothels.

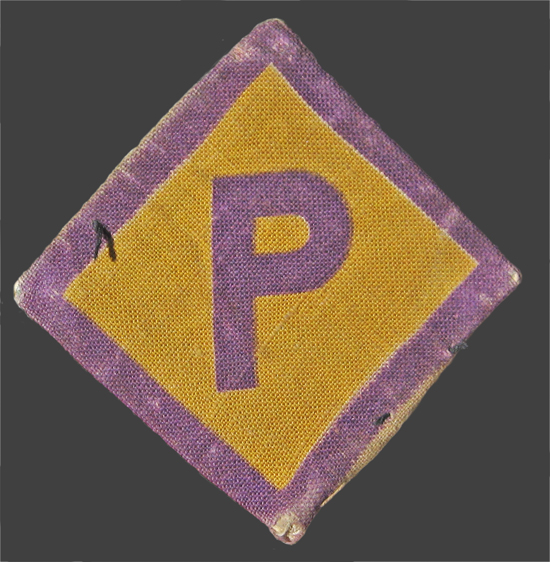
Polish-forced-workers' badge

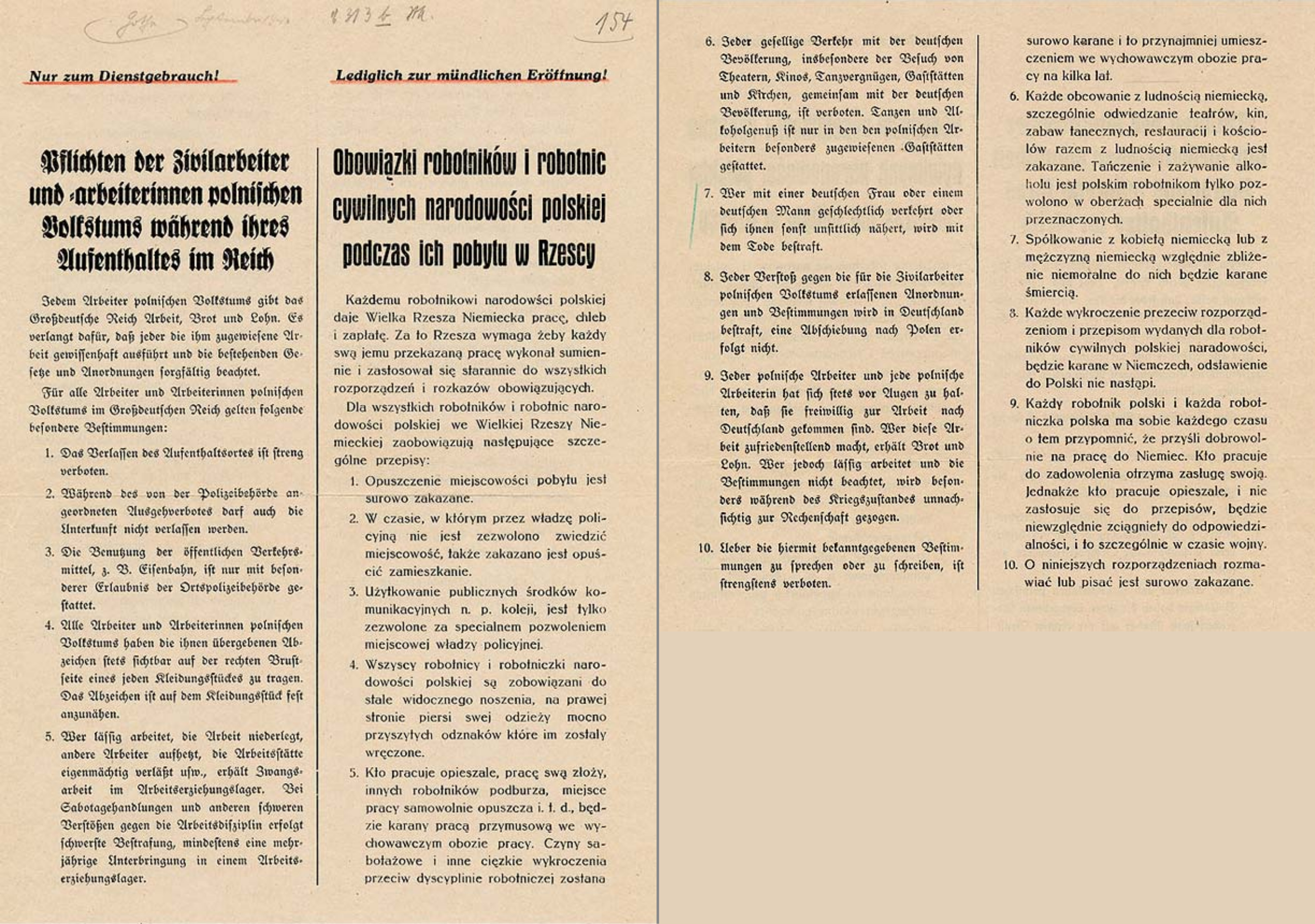
Poster in German and Polish listing decrees of labour obligations

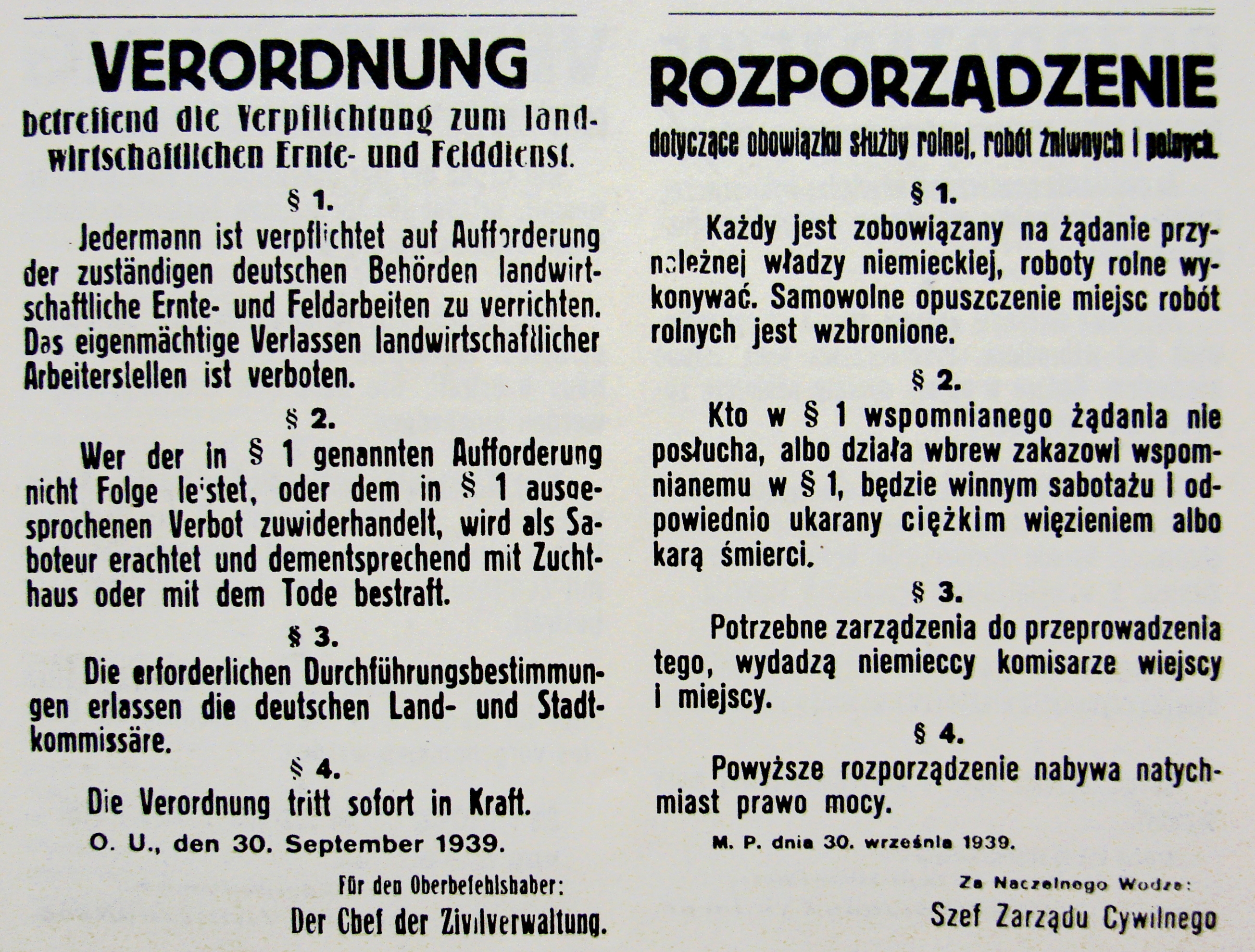
Notice of death penalty for Poles refusing to work during harvest

Labor shortages in the German war economy became critical especially after German defeat in the battle of Stalingrad in 1942–1943. This led to the increased use of prisoners as forced labourers in German industries. Following the German invasion and occupation of Polish territory, at least 1.5 million Polish citizens, including teenagers, became labourers in Germany, few by choice. Historian Jan Gross estimates that "no more than 15 per cent" of Polish workers volunteered to go to work in Germany. A total of 2.3 million Polish citizens, including 300,000 POWs, were deported to Germany as forced laborers. They tended to have to work longer hours for lower wages than their German counterparts.

=== Concentration and extermination camps ===
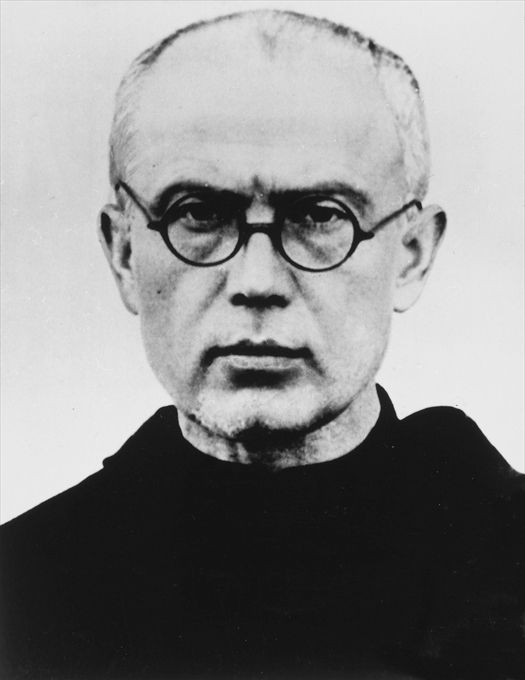
Polish Franciscan, Saint Maximilian Kolbe, at Auschwitz, volunteered to die in place of another prisoner.

A network of Nazi concentration camps were established on German-controlled territories, many of them in occupied Poland, including one of the largest and most infamous, Auschwitz (Oświęcim). Those camps were officially designed as labor camps, and many displayed the motto Arbeit macht frei ("Work brings freedom"). Only high-ranking officials knew that one of the purposes of some of the camps, known as extermination camps (or death camps), was mass murder of the undesirable minorities; officially the prisoners were used in enterprises such as production of synthetic rubber, as was the case of a plant owned by IG Farben, whose laborers came from Auschwitz III camp, or Monowitz. Laborers from concentration camps were literally worked to death. in what was known as extermination through labor.

Auschwitz received the first contingent of 728 Poles on 14 June 1940, transferred from an overcrowded prison at Tarnów. Within a year the Polish inmate population was in thousands, and begun to be exterminated, including in the first gassing experiment in September 1941. According to Polish historian Franciszek Piper, approximately 140,000–150,000 Poles went through Auschwitz, with about half of them perishing there due to executions, medical experiments, or due to starvation and disease. About 100,000 Poles were imprisoned in Majdanek camp, with similar fatality rate. About 30,000 Poles died at Mauthausen, 20,000 at Sachsenhausen and Gross-Rosen each, 17,000 at Neuengamme and Ravensbrueck each, 10,000 at Dachau, and tens of thousands perished in other camps and prisons.

=== The Holocaust ===
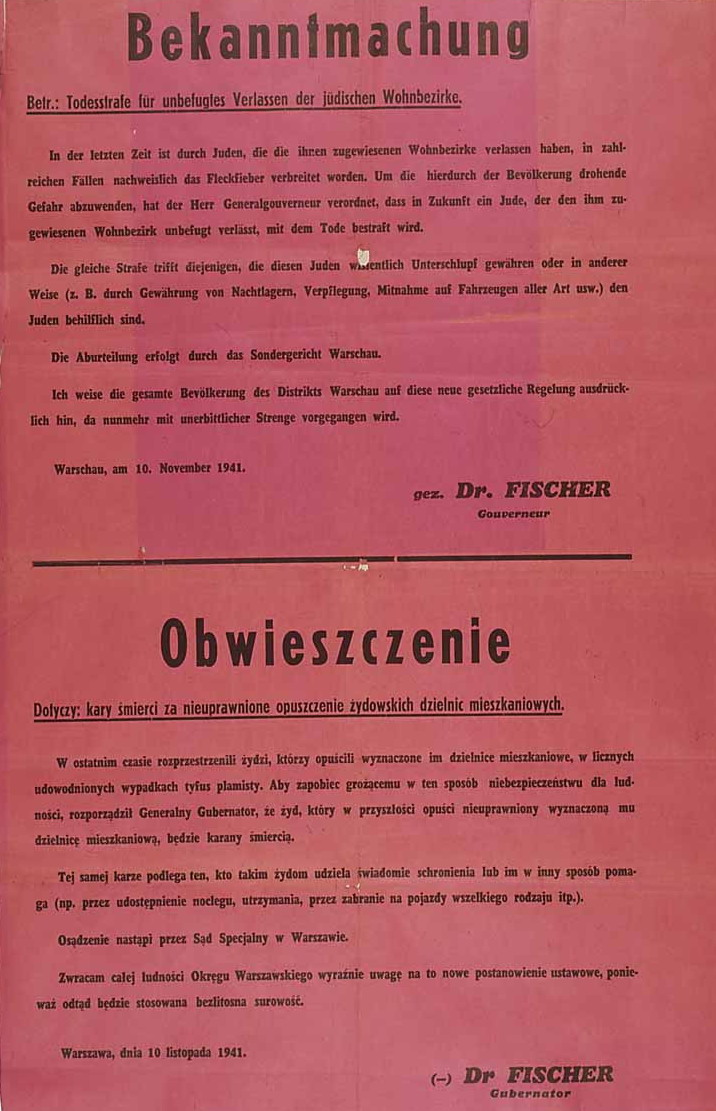
1941 announcement of death penalty for Jews caught outside the Ghetto, and for Poles helping Jews

Following the invasion of Poland in 1939, most of the approximately 3.5 million Polish Jews were rounded up and put into newly established ghettos by Nazi Germany. The ghetto system was unsustainable, as by the end of 1941 the Jews had no savings left to pay the SS for food deliveries and no chance to earn their own keep. At 20 January 1942 Wannsee Conference, held near Berlin, new plans were outlined for the total genocide of the Jews, known as the "Final Solution of the Jewish Question". The extermination program was codenamed Operation Reinhard. Three secret extermination camps set up specifically for Operation Reinhard; Treblinka, Belzec and Sobibor. In addition to the Reinhard camps, mass killing facilities such as gas chambers using Zyklon B were added to the Majdanek concentration camp in March 1942 and at Auschwitz and Chełmno.

=== Cultural genocide ===
Nazi Germany engaged in a concentrated effort to destroy Polish culture. To that end, numerous cultural and educational institutions were closed or destroyed, from schools and universities, through monuments and libraries, to laboratories and museums. Many employees of said institutions were arrested and executed as part of wider persecutions of the Polish intellectual elite. Schooling of Polish children was curtailed to a few years of elementary education, as outlined by Himmler's May 1940 memorandum: "The sole goal of this schooling is to teach them simple arithmetic, nothing above the number 500; writing one's name; and the doctrine that it is divine law to obey the Germans. ... I do not think that reading is desirable".

=== Extermination of elites ===
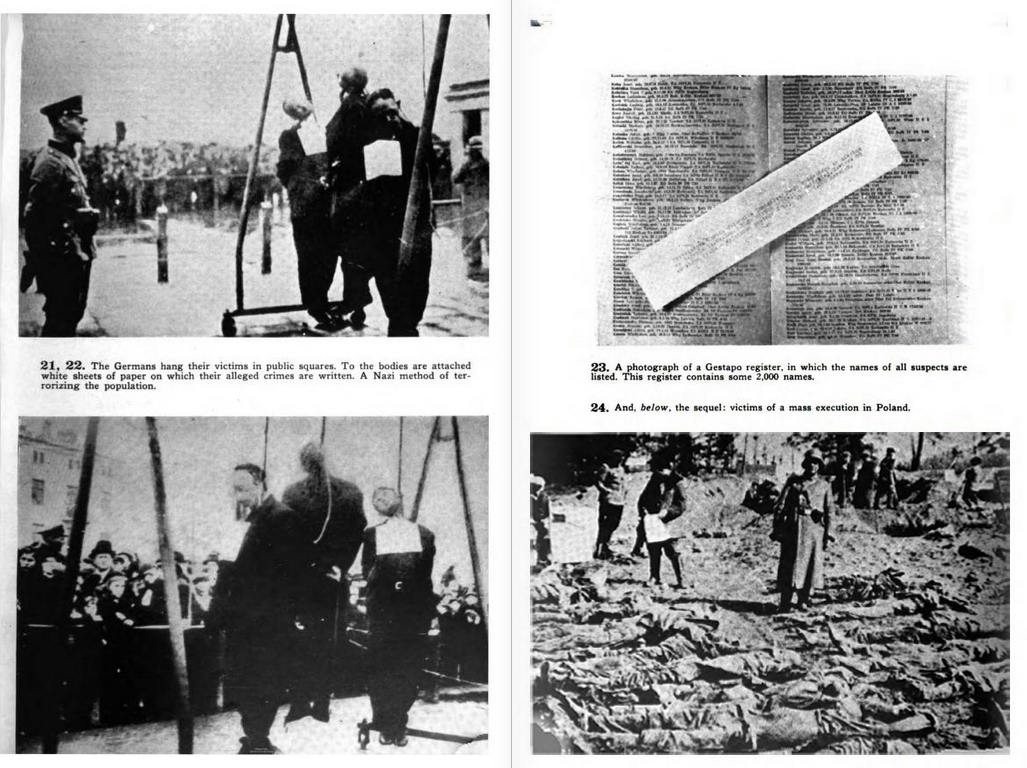
Photos from The Black Book of Poland, published in London in 1942 by the Polish government-in-exile.

The extermination of the Polish elites was the first stage of the Nazis' plan to destroy the Polish nation and its culture. The disappearance of the Poles' leadership was seen as necessary to the establishment of the Germans as the Poles' sole leaders. Proscription lists (Sonderfahndungsbuch Polen), prepared before the war started, identified more than 61,000 members of the Polish elite and intelligentsia leaders who were deemed unfriendly to Germany. Already during the 1939 German invasion, dedicated units of SS and police (the Einsatzgruppen) were tasked with arresting or outright killing of those resisting the Germans.

They were aided by some regular German army units and "self-defense" forces composed of members of the German minority in Poland, the Volksdeutsche. The Nazi regime's policy of murdering or suppressing the ethnic Polish elites was known as Operation Tannenberg. This included not only those resisting actively, but also those simply capable of doing so by the virtue of their social status. As a result, tens of thousands of people found "guilty" of being educated (members of the intelligentsia, from clergymen to government officials, doctors, teachers and journalists) or wealthy (landowners, business owners, and so on) were either executed on spot, sometimes in mass executions, or imprisoned, some destined for the concentration camps. Some of the mass executions were reprisal actions for actions of the Polish resistance, with German officials adhering to the collective guilt principle and holding entire communities responsible for the actions of unidentified perpetrators.

One of the most infamous German operations was the Außerordentliche Befriedungsaktion (AB-Aktion in short, German for Special Pacification), a German campaign during World War II aimed at Polish leaders and the intelligentsia, including many university professors, teachers and priests. In the spring and summer of 1940, more than 30,000 Poles were arrested by the German authorities of German-occupied Poland. Several thousands were executed outside Warsaw, in the Kampinos forest near Palmiry, and inside the city at the Pawiak prison. Most of the remainder were sent to various German concentration camps. Mass arrests and shootings of Polish intellectuals and academics included Sonderaktion Krakau and the massacre of Lwów professors.

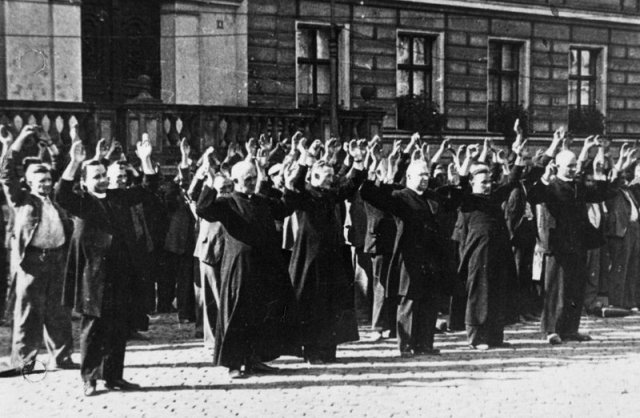
Public execution of Polish priests and civilians in Bydgoszcz's Old Market Square on 9 September 1939.

The Nazis also persecuted the Catholic Church in Poland and other, smaller religions. Nazi policy towards the Catholic Church was at its most severe in the territories it annexed to Greater Germany, where they set about systematically dismantling the Church – arresting its leaders, exiling its clergymen, closing its churches, monasteries and convents. Many clergymen and nuns were murdered or sent to concentration and labor camps. Already in 1939, 80% of the Catholic clergy of the Warthegau region had been deported to concentration camps. Primate of Poland, Cardinal August Hlond, submitted an official account of the persecutions of the Polish Church to the Vatican. In his final observations for Pope Pius XII, Hlond wrote: "Hitlerism aims at the systematic and total destruction of the Catholic Church in the... territories of Poland which have been incorporated into the Reich...". The smaller Evangelical churches of Poland also suffered. The entirety of the Protestant clergy of the Cieszyn region of Silesia were arrested and deported to concentration camps at Mauthausen, Buchenwald, Dachau and Oranienburg. Protestant clergy leaders who perished in those purges included charity activist Karol Kulisz, theology professor Edmund Bursche, and Bishop of the Evangelical Church of the Augsburg Confession in Poland, Juliusz Bursche.

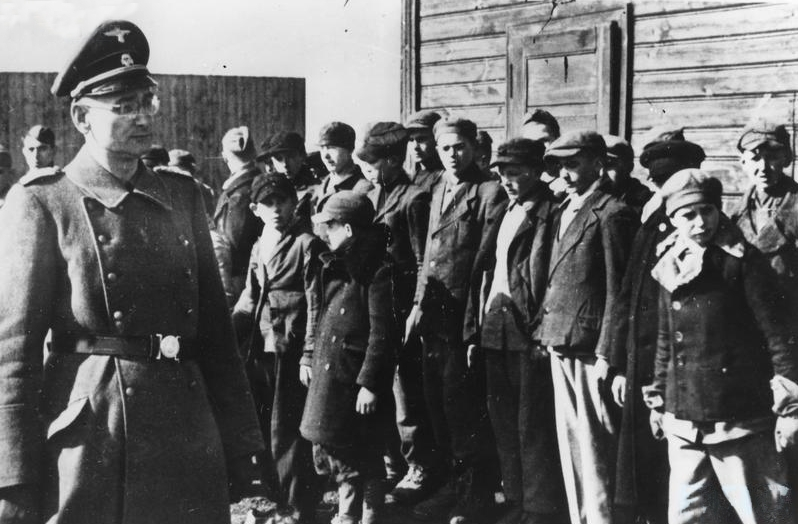
Boys' roll call at main children's concentration camp in Łódź (Kinder-KZ Litzmannstadt). A sub-camp was KZ Dzierżązna, for Polish girls as young as eight.

=== Germanization ===
In the territories annexed to Nazi Germany, in particular with regards to the westernmost incorporated territories—the so-called Wartheland— the Nazis aimed for a complete "Germanization", i.e. full cultural, political, economic and social assimilation. The Polish language was forbidden to be taught even in elementary schools; landmarks from streets to cities were renamed en masse (Łódź became Litzmannstadt, and so on). All manner of Polish enterprises, up to small shops, were taken over, with prior owners rarely compensated. Signs posted in public places prohibited non-Germans from entering these places warning: "Entrance is forbidden to Poles, Jews, and dogs.", or Nur für Deutsche ("Only for Germans"), commonly found on many public utilities and places such as trams, parks, cafes, cinemas, theaters, and others.

The Nazis kept an eye out for Polish children who possessed Nordic racial characteristics. An estimated total of 50,000 children, majority taken from orphanages and foster homes in the annexed lands, but some separated from their parents, were taken into a special Germanization program. Polish women deported to Germany as forced labourers and who bore children were a common victim of this policy, with their infants regularly taken. If the child passed the battery of racial, physical and psychological tests, they were sent on to Germany for "Germanization".

At least 4,454 children were given new German names, forbidden to use the Polish language, and reeducated in Nazi institutions. Few were ever reunited with their original families. Those deemed as unsuitable for Germanization for being "not Aryan enough" were sent to orphanages or even to concentration camps like Auschwitz, where many were murdered, often by intracardiac injections of phenol. For Polish forced laborers, in some cases if an examination of the parents suggested that the child might not be "racially valuable", the mother was forced to have an abortion. Infants who did not pass muster would be removed to a state orphanage (Ausländerkinder-Pflegestätte), where many were murdered through calculated malnourishment, neglect, and unhygienic conditions.

=== Nazi plunder in Poland ===
Following the German invasion of Poland in September 1939 and the occupation of Poland by German forces, the Nazi regime attempted to destroy Polish culture. As part of that policy, the Nazis confiscated Polish national heritage assets and much private property. Acting on the legal decrees of 19 October and 16 December (Verordnung über die Beschlagnahme Kunstgegeständen im Generalgouvernement), several German agencies began the process of looting Polish museums and other collections, ostensibly considered necessary for the "securing" of German national interests.

Nazi plunder included private and public art collections, artefacts, precious metals, books, and personal possessions. Hitler and Göring in particular were interested in acquiring looted art treasures from occupied Europe, the former planning to use the stolen art to fill the galleries of the planned Führermuseum (Leader's Museum), and the latter for his personal collection. Göring, having stripped almost all of occupied Poland of its artworks within six months of Germany's invasion, ultimately grew a collection valued at over 50 million Reichsmarks.

=== Resistance ===
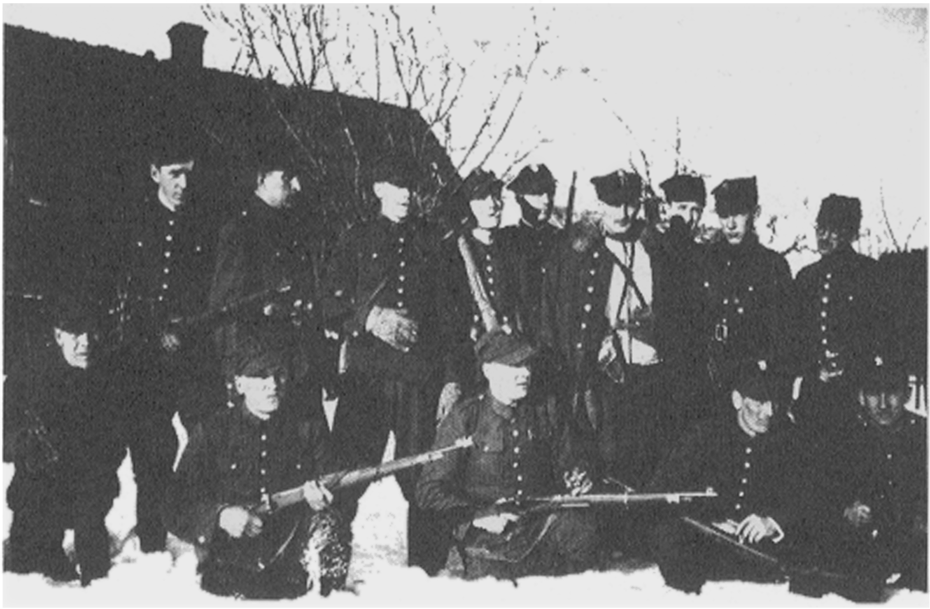
Earliest World War II partisan unit, commanded by Henryk "Hubal" Dobrzański, winter 1939

Despite the military defeat of the Polish Army in September 1939, the Polish government itself never surrendered, instead evacuating West, where it formed the Polish government in Exile. The government in exile was represented in the occupied Poland by the Government Delegation for Poland, headed by the Government Delegate for Poland. The main role of the civilian branch of the Underground State was to preserve the continuity of the Polish state as a whole, including its institutions. These institutions included the police, the courts, and schools. By the final years of the war, the civilian structure of the Underground State included an underground parliament, administration, judiciary (courts and police), secondary and higher-level education, and supported various cultural activities such as publishing of newspapers and books, underground theatres, lectures, exhibitions, concerts and safeguarded various works of art. It also dealt with providing social services, including to the destitute Jewish population (through the council to Aid Jews, or Żegota). Through the Directorate of Civil Resistance (1941–1943) the civil arm was also involved in lesser acts of resistance, such as minor sabotage, although in 1943 this department was merged with the Directorate of Covert Resistance, forming the Directorate of Underground Resistance, subordinate to the Armia Krajowa (AK) (Polish Home Army).

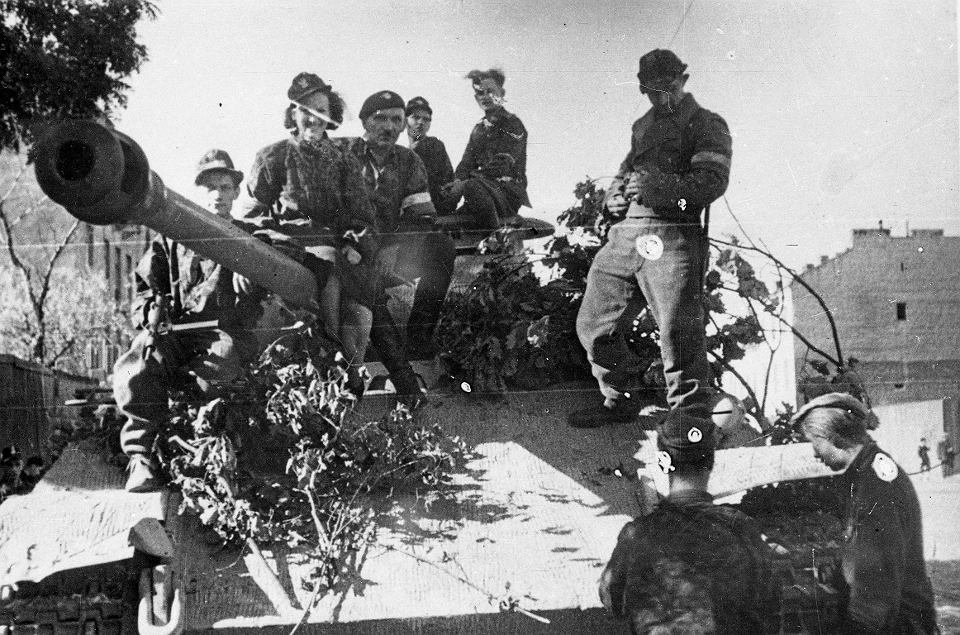
German Panther tank captured by the Poles during 1944 Warsaw Uprising, with Batalion Zośka armored platoon commanded by Wacław Micuta

In response to the occupation, Poles formed one of the largest underground movements in Europe. Resistance to the Nazi German occupation began almost at once. The Armia Krajowa, loyal to the Polish government in exile in London and a military arm of the Polish Underground State, was formed from a number of smaller groups in 1942. There was also the Armia Ludowa (AL) (Polish People's Army), backed by the Soviet Union and controlled by the Polish Workers' Party (Polish Polska Partia Robotnicza or PPR), though significantly less numerous than the Home Army. In February 1942, when AK was formed, it numbered about 100,000 members. In the beginning of 1943, it had reached a strength of about 200,000. In the summer of 1944, when Operation Tempest begun AK reached its highest membership numbers. Estimates of AK membership in the first half of 1944 and summer that year vary, with about 400,000 being common.

With the imminent arrival of the Soviet army, the AK launched the Warsaw Uprising against the German army on 1 August 1944. The uprising, receiving little assistance from the nearby Soviet forces, eventually failed, significantly reducing the Home Army's power and position. About 200,000 Poles, most of them civilians, lost their lives in the Uprising.

=== Effect on the Polish population ===
The Polish civilian population suffered under German occupation in many ways. Large numbers were expelled from land intended for German colonisation, and forced to resettle in the General-Government area. Hundreds of thousands of Poles were deported to Germany for forced labour in industry and agriculture, where many thousands died. Poles were also conscripted for labour in Poland, and were held in labour camps all over the country, again with a high death rate. There was a general shortage of food, fuel for heating and medical supplies, and there was a high death rate among the Polish population as a result. Finally, thousands of Poles were killed as reprisals for resistance attacks on German forces or for other reasons. In all, about three million Poles died as a result of the German occupation, more than 10% of the pre-war population. When this is added to the three million Polish Jews who were killed as a matter of policy by the Germans, Poland lost about 22% of its population, the highest proportion of any European country in World War II.

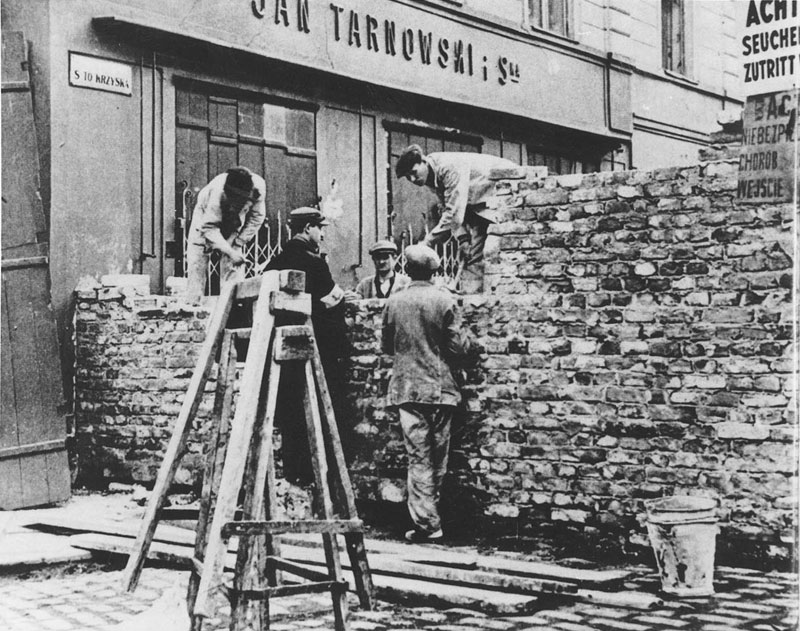
Walling-off Świętokrzyska Street seen from Marszałkowska Street on the 'Aryan side' of the Warsaw Ghetto, 1940

The Warsaw Ghetto wall (1940-1943)

Poland had a large Jewish population, and according to Davies, more Jews were both killed and rescued in Poland, than in any other nation, the rescue figure usually being put at between 100,000 and 150,000. Thousands of Poles have been honoured as Righteous Among the Nations – constituting the largest national contingent. When AK Home Army Intelligence discovered the true fate of transports leaving the Jewish Ghetto, the council to Aid Jews (Zegota) was established in late 1942, in cooperation with church groups. The organisation saved thousands. Emphasis was placed on protecting children, as it was nearly impossible to intervene directly against the heavily guarded transports. The Germans implemented several different laws to separate Poles and Jews in the ghettos with Poles living on the "Aryan Side" and the Jews living on the "Jewish Side", despite the risk of death many Poles risked their lives by forging "Aryan Papers" for Jews to make them appear as non-Jewish Poles so they could live on the Aryan side and avoid Nazi persecution. Another law implemented by the Germans was that Poles were forbidden from buying from Jewish shops in which, if they did, they were subject to execution. Jewish children were also distributed among safe houses and church networks. Jewish children were often placed in church orphanages and convents.

Some three million gentile Polish citizens perished during the course of the war, over two million of whom were ethnic Poles (the remainder being mostly Ukrainians and Belarusians). The vast majority of those killed were civilians, mostly killed by the actions of Nazi Germany and the Soviet Union.

Aside from being sent to Nazi concentration camps, most ethnic Poles died through shelling and bombing campaigns, mass executions, forced starvation, revenge murder, ill health, and slave labour. Along with Auschwitz II-Birkenau, the main six extermination camps in occupied Poland were used predominantly to exterminate Jews. Stutthof concentration camp was used for mass extermination of Poles. A number of civilian labour camps (Gemeinschaftslager) for Poles (Polenlager) were established inside Polish territory. Many Poles died in German camps. The first non-German prisoners at Auschwitz were Poles who were the majority of inmates there until 1942 when the systematic killing of the Jews began. The first killing by poison gas at Auschwitz involved 300 Poles and 700 Soviet prisoners of war. Many Poles and other Central and Eastern Europeans were also sent to concentration camps in Germany: over 35,000 to Dachau, 33,000 to the camp for women at Ravensbrück, 30,000 to Mauthausen and 20,000 to Sachsenhausen.

The population in the General Government's territory was initially about 12 million in an area of 94,000 square kilometres (36,000 mi^{2}), but this increased as about 860,000 Poles and Jews were expelled from the German-annexed areas and "resettled" in the General Government. Offsetting this was the German campaign of extermination of the Polish intelligentsia and other elements thought likely to resist (e.g. Operation Tannenberg). From 1941, disease and hunger also began to reduce the population. Poles were deported in large numbers to work as forced labour in Germany: eventually about a million were deported, and many died in Germany.

== Treatment of Polish citizens under Soviet occupation ==
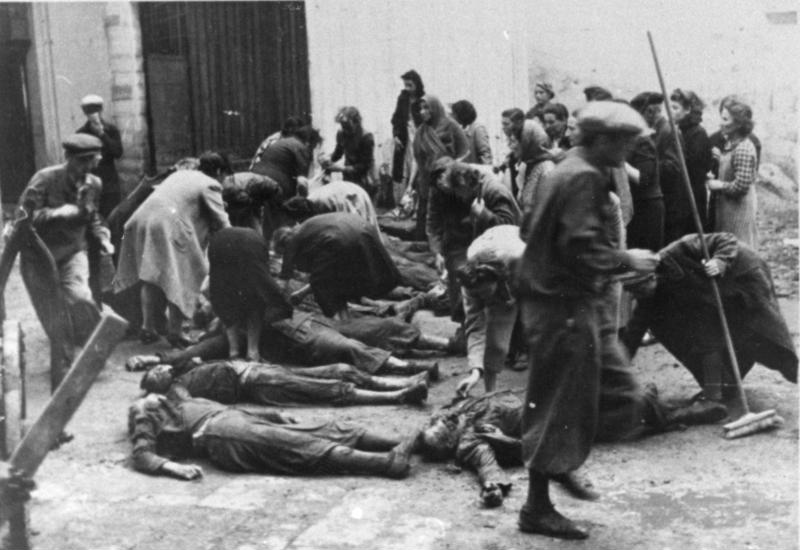
Identifying ethnic German prisoners massacred by Soviet secret police NKVD near Tarnopol, July 1941

By the end of the initial invasion of Poland (the "Polish Defensive War"), the Soviet Union took over 52.1% of Poland's territory (≈200,000 km^{2}), with over 13,700,000 people. The estimates vary; Prof. Elżbieta Trela-Mazur gives the following numbers in regards to the ethnic composition of these areas: 38% Poles (ca. 5.1 million people), 37% Ukrainians, 14.5% Belarusians, 8.4% Jews, 0.9% Russians and 0.6% Germans. There were also 336,000 refugees from areas occupied by Germany, most of them Jews (198,000). Areas occupied by the USSR were annexed to Soviet territory, with the exception of the Wilno area, which was transferred to Lithuania, although it was soon attached to the USSR once Lithuania became a Soviet republic.

Initially the Soviet occupation gained support among some members of the linguistic minorities who had chafed under the nationalist policies of the Second Polish Republic. Much of the Ukrainian population initially welcomed the unification with the Soviet Ukraine because twenty years earlier their attempt at self-determination failed during both the Polish–Ukrainian War and the Ukrainian–Soviet War.

There were large groups of prewar Polish citizens, notably Jewish youth and, to a lesser extent, the Ukrainian peasants, who saw the Soviet power as an opportunity to start political or social activity outside their traditional ethnic or cultural groups. Their enthusiasm however faded with time as it became clear that the Soviet repressions were aimed at all groups equally, regardless of their political stance.

British historian Simon Sebag Montefiore states that Soviet terror in the occupied eastern Polish lands was as cruel and tragic as the Nazis' in the west. Soviet authorities brutally treated those who might oppose their rule, deporting by 10 November 1940 around 10% of total population of Kresy, with 30% of those deported dead by 1941. They arrested and imprisoned about 500,000 Poles during 1939–1941, including former officials, officers, and natural "enemies of the people" like the clergy, but also noblemen and intellectuals. The Soviets also executed about 65,000 Poles. Soldiers of the Red Army and their officers behaved like conquerors, looting and stealing Polish treasures. When Stalin was told about it, he answered: "If there is no ill will, they [the soldiers] can be pardoned".

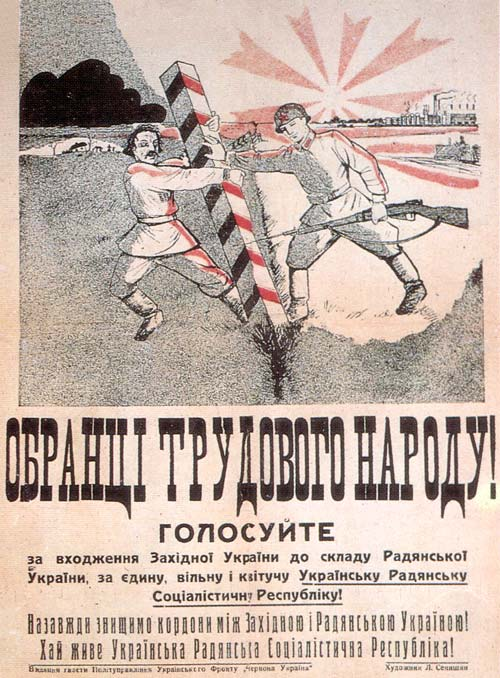
Sovietization propaganda poster addressed to the Ukrainian population residing within Polish borders. The text reads "Electors of the working people! Vote for joining of Western Ukraine into the Soviet Ukraine"

The Soviet Union had ceased to recognize the Polish state at the start of the invasion. As a result, the two governments never officially declared war on each other. The Soviets therefore did not classify Polish military prisoners as prisoners of war but as rebels against the new legal government of Western Ukraine and Western Byelorussia.^{[n]} The Soviets killed tens of thousands of Polish prisoners of war. Some, like General Józef Olszyna-Wilczyński, who was captured, interrogated and shot on 22 September, were executed during the campaign itself. On 24 September, the Soviets killed 42 staff and patients of a Polish military hospital in the village of Grabowiec, near Zamość. The Soviets also executed all the Polish officers they captured after the Battle of Szack, on 28 September. Over 20,000 Polish military personnel and civilians perished in the Katyn massacre.

The Poles and the Soviets re-established diplomatic relations in 1941, following the Sikorski-Mayski Agreement; but the Soviets broke them off again in 1943 after the Polish government demanded an independent examination of the recently discovered Katyn burial pits. The Soviets then lobbied the Western Allies to recognize the pro-Soviet Polish puppet government of Wanda Wasilewska in Moscow.

On 28 September 1939, the Soviet Union and Germany had changed the secret terms of the Molotov–Ribbentrop Pact. They moved Lithuania into the Soviet sphere of influence and shifted the border in Poland to the east, giving Germany more territory. By this arrangement, often described as a fourth partition of Poland, the Soviet Union secured almost all Polish territory east of the line of the rivers Pisa, Narew, Western Bug and San. This amounted to about 200,000 square kilometres of land, inhabited by 13.5 million Polish citizens.

The Red Army had originally sowed confusion among the locals by claiming that they were arriving to save Poland from the Nazis. Their advance surprised Polish communities and their leaders, who had not been advised how to respond to a Bolshevik invasion. Polish and Jewish citizens may at first have preferred a Soviet regime to a German one, but the Soviets soon proved as hostile and destructive towards the Polish people and their culture as the Nazis. They began confiscating, nationalising and redistributing all private and state-owned Polish property. During the two years following the annexation, they arrested approximately 100,000 Polish citizens and deported between 350,000 and 1,500,000, of whom between 150,000 and 1,000,000 died, mostly civilians.^{[b]}

=== Removal of Polish governmental and social institutions ===
While Germans enforced their policies based on racism, the Soviet administration justified their Stalinist policies by appealing to the Soviet ideology, which in reality meant the thorough Sovietization of the area. Immediately after their conquest of eastern Poland, the Soviet authorities started a campaign of Sovietization of the newly acquired areas. No later than several weeks after the last Polish units surrendered, on 22 October 1939, the Soviets organized staged elections to the Moscow-controlled Supreme Soviets (legislative body) of Western Byelorussia and Western Ukraine. The result of the staged voting was to become a legitimization of Soviet annexation of eastern Poland.

Residents of a town in Eastern Poland (now West Belarus) assembled to greet the arrival of the Red Army during the Soviet invasion of Poland in 1939. The Russian text reads "Long Live the great theory of Marx, Engels, Lenin-Stalin" and contains a spelling error. Such welcomings were organized by the activists of the Communist Party of West Belarus affiliated with the Communist Party of Poland, delegalized in both countries by 1938.

Subsequently, all institutions of the dismantled Polish state were closed down and reopened under the Soviet appointed supervisors. Lwow University and many other schools were reopened soon but they were restarted anew as Soviet institutions rather than continuing their old legacy. Lwow University was reorganized in accordance with the Statute Books for Soviet Higher Schools. The tuition, that along with the institution's Polonophile traditions, kept the university inaccessible to most of the rural Ukrainophone population, was abolished and several new chairs were opened, particularly the chairs of Russian language and literature. The chairs of Marxism-Leninism, Dialectical and Historical Materialism aimed at strengthening of the Soviet ideology were opened as well. Polish literature and language studies ware dissolved by Soviet authorities. Forty-five new faculty members were assigned to it and transferred from other institutions of Soviet Ukraine, mainly the Kharkiv and Kiev universities. On 15 January 1940 the Lviv University was reopened and started to teach in accordance with Soviet curricula.

Simultaneously, Soviet authorities attempted to remove the traces of Polish history of the area by eliminating much of what had any connection to the Polish state or even Polish culture in general. On 21 December 1939, the Polish currency was withdrawn from circulation without any exchange to the newly introduced rouble, which meant that the entire population of the area lost all of their life savings overnight.

All the media became controlled by Moscow. Soviet authorities implemented a political regime similar to a police state, based on terror. All Polish parties and organizations were disbanded. Only the Communist Party was allowed to exist along with organizations subordinated to it.

All organized religions were persecuted. All enterprises were taken over by the state, while agriculture was made collective.

=== Rule of terror ===
An inherent part of the Sovietization was a rule of terror started by the NKVD and other Soviet agencies. The first victims of the new order were approximately 250,000 Polish prisoners of war captured by the USSR during and after the Polish Defensive War (see Polish prisoners of war in Soviet Union (after 1939)). As the Soviet Union did not sign any international convention on rules of war, they were denied the status of prisoners of war and instead almost all of the captured officers were then murdered (see Katyn massacre) or sent to a Gulag. Ordinary soldiers who were ethnic minorities living in the territories that the Soviet Union planned to annex were released and allowed to go home. Those who lived in the German zone of occupation were transferred to the Germans. "Military settlers" were excluded from home release. About 23,000 of POWs were separated from the rest and sent to construct a highway, with a planned release in December 1939. Thousands of others would fall victim to NKVD massacres of prisoners in mid-1941, after Germany invaded the Soviet Union.

Similar policies were applied to the civilian population as well. The Soviet authorities regarded service for the pre-war Polish state as a "crime against revolution" and "counter-revolutionary activity", and subsequently started arresting large numbers of Polish intelligentsia, politicians, civil servants and scientists, but also ordinary people suspected of posing a threat to the Soviet rule. Among the arrested members of the Polish intelligentsia were former prime ministers Leon Kozłowski and Aleksander Prystor, as well as Stanisław Grabski, Stanisław Głąbiński and the Baczewski family. Initially aimed primarily at possible political opponents, by January 1940 the NKVD aimed its campaign also at its potential allies, including the Polish communists and socialists. Among the arrested were Władysław Broniewski, Aleksander Wat, Tadeusz Peiper, Leopold Lewin, Anatol Stern, Teodor Parnicki, Marian Czuchnowski and many others.

=== Deportation ===
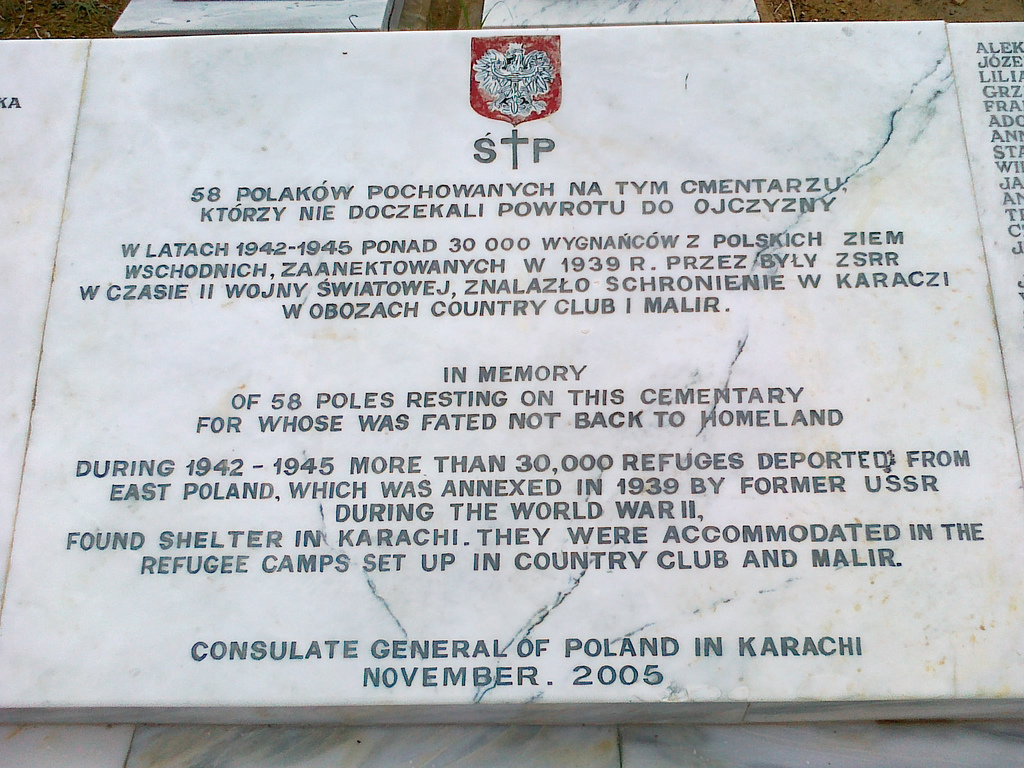
During 1942–1945, nearly 30,000 Poles were deported by the Soviet Union to Karachi (then under British rule). This photo shows a memorial to the refugees who died in Karachi and were buried at the Karachi graveyard.

In 1940 and the first half of 1941, the Soviets deported more than 1,200,000 Poles, most in four mass deportations. The first deportation took place 10 February 1940, with more than 220,000 sent to northern European Russia; the second on 13 April 1940, sending 320,000 primarily to Kazakhstan; a third wave in June–July 1940 totaled more than 240,000; the fourth occurred in June 1941, deporting 300,000. Upon resumption of Polish-Soviet diplomatic relations in 1941, it was determined based on Soviet information that more than 760,000 of the deportees had died – a large part of those dead being children, who had comprised about a third of deportees.

Approximately 100,000 former Polish citizens were arrested during the two years of Soviet occupation. The prisons soon got severely overcrowded. with detainees suspected of anti-Soviet activities and the NKVD had to open dozens of ad hoc prison sites in almost all towns of the region. The wave of arrests led to forced resettlement of large categories of people (kulaks, Polish civil servants, forest workers, university professors or osadniks, for instance) to the Gulag labour camps and exile settlements in remote areas of the Soviet Union. Altogether roughly a million people were sent to the east in four major waves of deportations. According to Norman Davies, almost half of them were dead by the time the Sikorski-Mayski Agreement had been signed in 1941.

According to the Soviet law, all residents of the annexed area, dubbed by the Soviets as citizens of former Poland, automatically acquired Soviet citizenship. However, actual conferral of citizenship still required the individual's consent and the residents were strongly pressured for such consent. The refugees who opted out were threatened with repatriation to Nazi controlled territories of Poland.

=== Exploitation of ethnic tensions ===
In addition, the Soviets exploited past ethnic tension between Poles and other ethnic groups, inciting and encouraging violence against Poles calling the minorities to "rectify the wrongs they had suffered during twenty years of Polish rule". Pre-war Poland was portrayed as a capitalist state based on exploitation of the working people and ethnic minorities. Soviet propaganda claimed that unfair treatment of non-Poles by the Second Polish Republic was a justification of its dismemberment. Soviet officials openly incited mobs to perform killings and robberies. The death toll of the initial Soviet-inspired terror campaign remains unknown.

== Casualties ==
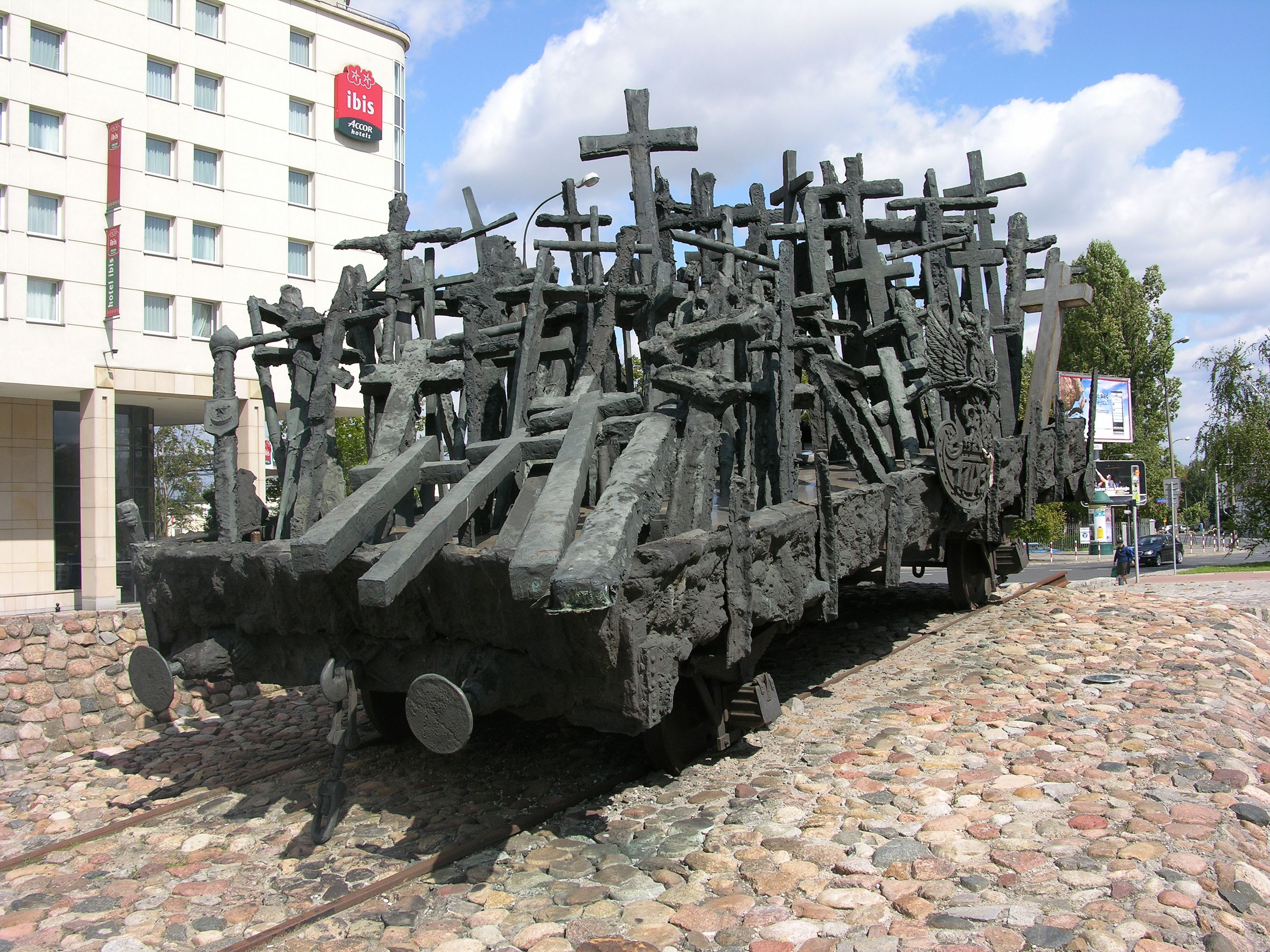
Monument to the Fallen and Murdered in the East, Warsaw

Around six million Polish citizens – nearly 21.4% of the pre-war population of the Second Polish Republic — died between 1939 and 1945. Over 90% of the death toll involved non-military losses, as most civilians were targets of various deliberate actions by the Germans and Soviets.

Both occupiers wanted not only to gain Polish territory, but also to destroy Polish culture and the Polish nation as a whole.

Tadeusz Piotrowski, Professor of Sociology at the University of New Hampshire has provided a reassessment of Poland's losses in World War II. Polish war dead included 5,150,000 victims of Nazi crimes against ethnic Poles and the Holocaust, the treatment of Polish citizens by occupiers included 350,000 deaths during the Soviet occupation in 1940–41 and about 100,000 Poles were killed in 1943–44 in Ukraine. Of the 100,000 Poles killed in Ukraine, 80,000 perished during the massacres of Poles in Volhynia and Eastern Galicia by the Ukrainian Insurgent Army. Losses by ethnic group were 3,100,000 Jews; 2,000,000 ethnic Poles; 500,000 Ukrainians and Belarusians.

In August 2009, the Polish Institute of National Remembrance (IPN) researchers estimated Poland's dead (including Polish Jews) at between 5.47 and 5.67 million (due to German actions) and 150,000 (due to Soviet), or around 5.62 and 5.82 million total.

The official Polish government report prepared in 1947 listed 6,028,000 war deaths out of a population of 27,007,000 ethnic Poles and Jews; this report excluded ethnic Ukrainian and Belarusian losses. However some historians in Poland now believe that Polish war losses were at least two million ethnic Poles and three million Jews as a result of the war.

Another assessment, Poles as Victims of the Nazi Era, prepared by USHMM, lists 1.8 to 1.9 million ethnic Polish dead in addition to three million Polish Jews.

Prisoner of war deaths totaled 250,000; in Germany (120,000) and in the USSR (130,000).

The genocide of Romani people (porajmos) was 35,000 persons. Jewish Holocaust victims totaled 3,000,000.

== See also ==
- Arbeitsamt in occupied Poland
- Chronicles of Terror
- The Holocaust in Poland
- Nazi crimes against the Polish nation
- Polish minority in Germany
- Polish minority in the Soviet Union
- Soviet repressions of Polish citizens (1939-1946)
- Gestapo–NKVD conferences
- Territorial evolution of Poland
