= Stefan Korboński =

Polish politician, lawyer, and journalist

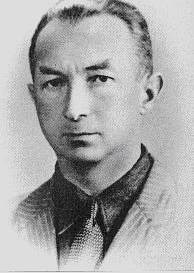
- Stefan Korboński
- Born: 2 March 1901; Praszka, Poland
- Died: 23 April 1989 (aged 88); Washington, D.C., USA
- Occupations: Politician, lawyer
- Known for: Holocaust rescue

Stefan Korboński (2 March 1901 – 23 April 1989) was a Polish agrarian politician, lawyer, journalist, and a notable member of the wartime authorities of the Polish Secret State. Among others, he was the last person to hold the post of Government Delegate for Poland. Arrested by the NKVD in 1945, he was released soon afterwards only to be forced into exile. He settled in the United States, where he remained active among the local Polish diaspora. An active journalist, he was among the few people whose names were completely banned by the communist censorship in Poland.

== Early life ==
Stefan Korboński was born 2 March 1901 in Praszka near Wieluń. In 1908 his family moved to Częstochowa, where Korboński received basic education at the local gymnasium. However, already in 1918 he joined the ranks of the Lwów Eaglets as a volunteer and took part in the Defence of Lwów. After the besieged city had been liberated, he returned home and volunteered for the Polish Army at the outbreak of the Polish-Soviet War. Demobilized after the end of hostilities, he did not return home and instead volunteered for the third time - this time joining the ranks of the troops of the Third Silesian Uprising. For his service in various formations he was awarded with the Virtuti Militari and the Silesian Cross.

After the Polish conflicts for the borders ended, Korboński passed his matura exams and joined the Adam Mickiewicz University of Poznań, where he graduated from the faculty of law. During his studies he became involved in politics and joined the ranks of the Polish People's Party "Wyzwolenie" and then, in 1931, the People's Party. Following his application, he started working in the local Prosecutors Office and in 1929 opened up his own practice in Warsaw. He also quickly rose through the ranks of his party and in 1936 became its chairman for the Białystok Voivodeship (1919–1939). Korboński married Zofia Ristau on 10 July 1938.

== World War II activities ==
Prior to the outbreak of World War II he was mobilized for the Polish Army and commissioned to the 57th Infantry Regiment in the rank of First Lieutenant. During the Polish Defensive War his unit got surrounded by the Red Army and Korboński himself was taken prisoner by the NKVD. However, he managed to escape and reach the German-occupied part of Poland. He help found the Polish underground as an active member of the Union of Armed Struggle (ZWZ) and then the Armia Krajowa. Simultaneously, he was also one of the leaders of the clandestine People's Party, active within the system of the Polish Secret State.

As such in 1940 he became a member of the Political Communications Committee, a clandestine political platform attached to the underground army as its political arm and a nucleus of the future parliament. Supported by most parties, already in April of the following year he became the chief of the Directorate of Civil Struggle, the agenda of the Polish government responsible for the coordination and organization of civilian resistance, information and propaganda. During his term at the office, Korboński also extended the responsibilities of the Directorate by including maintaining law and order, organizing a net of underground civil courts and coordinating carrying out their verdicts by the National Security Corps.

Korboński in December 1942 became head of Directorate of Civil Resistance. It was Korboński who informed the London-based Poles that the slaughter of Jews in the Warsaw Ghetto had started. The BBC broadcast the information. In July 1943 Korboński also became the head of the Social Resistance Department of the Directorate of Underground Resistance. Following the outbreak of the Warsaw Uprising in August 1944, Korboński became the chief of the Department of Internal Affairs, a de facto minister of internal affairs of Poland. However, the fall of the Uprising put an end to that duty. Korboński managed to leave Warsaw as a civilian and continued his duties in hiding. In March 1945, after the NKVD arrested Jan Stanisław Jankowski, Korboński became the last Government Delegate at Home and held that post until his arrest by the NKVD in June of the same year, during which time he worked to rebuild Government Delegacy.

== Postwar career ==
Released from Soviet prison following the creation of the communist-controlled Provisional Government of National Unity, he returned to the bar and active political career within the reactivated Polish People's Party, the most popular party in Poland at the time and the main opposition force to the Soviet-backed communist regime. 30 of the 145 seats in the post-war government were offered to non-Soviet supported group and it was planned for Korboński to be part of the post-war government but his name was removed by Bierut. In the forged 1947 elections he was also elected a member of the Sejm. However, the rise of Stalinism in Poland put an end to a small margin of political freedom and, following the flight of Stanisław Mikołajczyk, Korboński and his wife also were forced to flee Poland. They fled to Sweden and then settled in the United States.

Korboński continued his political career in the United States within Polish emigre circles. He headed the New York office in 1950. Korboński also became a noted journalist, a head of the Polish Council of Unity and a member of the International PEN Club. Among other awards, in 1973 he received the Alfred Jurzykowski Prize and in 1980 the Yad Vashem Institute granted Korboński with the Righteous Among the Nations medal. Korboński was also a recipient of the Cross of the Home Army, the 1939-1945 War Medal, Golden Cross of Merit and the Order of the White Eagle (posthumously in 1995).

He died of aneurysm at the George Washington University Hospital.

== Scholarly work ==
Korboński authored numerous works devoted to the history of AK and Polish underground. They include:

- W imieniu Rzeczypospolitej, Paris: Instytut Literacki, 1954
- W imieniu Polski Walczącej, London: B. Świderski, 1963
- Polskie Państwo Podziemne, Paris: Instytut Literacki, 1975
- Między młotem a kowadłem, London: Gryf, 1969
- W imieniu Kremla, Paris: Instytut Literacki, 1956
- The Jews and the Poles in World War II, New York : Hippocrene Books, 1989.

=== Non-fiction novel ===
- Za murami Kremla (Behind the Walls of the Kremlin), New York: Bicentennial Publishing Corporation, 1983.

== See also ==
- List of Polish lawyers
- Trial of the Sixteen
