= Military Special Court =

Military Special Courts (Polish: Wojskowe Sądownictwo Specjalne) or WSS was the underground court of the Polish Underground State during World War II. The only such extensive court system in German-occupied Europe.

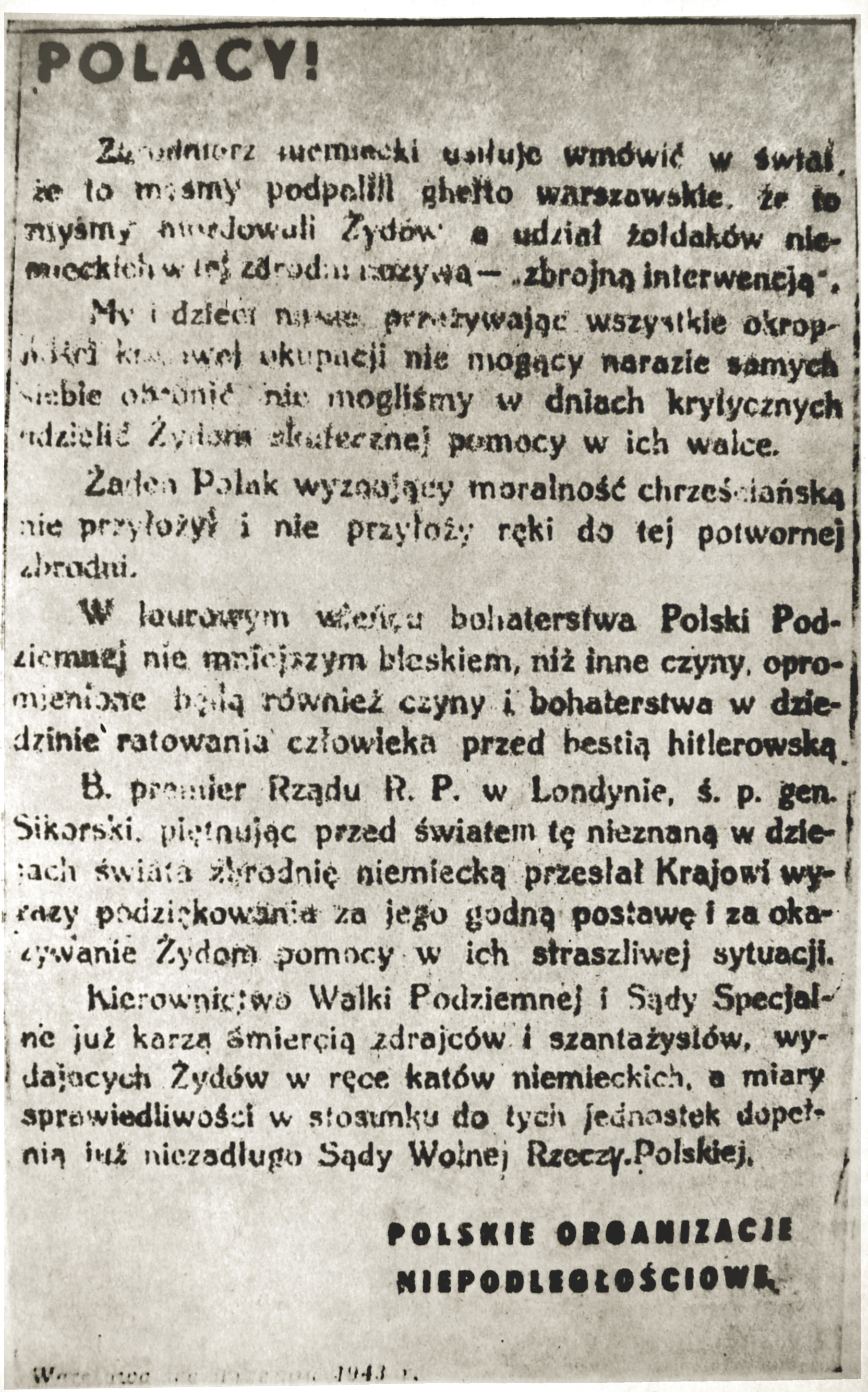
A leaflet from 1943 announcing the death penalty for "traitors and blackmailers" who denounced Jews in hiding.

== History ==
=== In the structure of the Union of Armed Struggle ===
Already from the end of 1939, local units of the Service for Poland's Victory (SZP), and later the Union of Armed Struggle (ZWZ), executed traitors. It was a practice that commanders of the appropriate ranks submitted applications for execution to the commanders of the appropriate districts. There was also an ad hoc judicial panel of the SZP Headquarters, which issued several death sentences.

On April 16, 1940, the Committee of Ministers for Home Affairs issued the "Resolution on Hooded Courts in the Country", which was approved by the Commander-in-Chief and Inspector General of the Armed Forces and the Prime Minister, General Władysław Sikorski.

The resolution established two court structures:

- Military Hood Courts (Wojskowe Sądy Kapturowe), which were criminal courts established in the territories of both occupations (German and Soviet) at the ZWZ commanders. There was also a local structure: established at the area and district commander, they tried crimes committed by ZWZ members. Hood Courts were also established at the ZWZ Main Headquarters (KG) in Paris and at liaison bases.
- Hood Courts at the Government Delegation for Poland and the district delegations, dealing with crimes committed by Polish civilians and by representatives of the occupation apparatus.

The activities of military courts, known from the beginning as Special Courts (Sądami Specjalnymi), were based on the Code of Kaptur Courts and the "Substantive Regulations" developed in May 1940, issued by the Commander-in-Chief of the Union of Armed Struggle Kazimierz Sosnkowski and approved by General Sikorski. The regulations were a supplement to the pre-war penal and military penal codes and defined, among other things, which crimes were subject to the death penalty: treason, espionage, provocation, denunciation, inhuman persecution and harming the Polish population. The Code of Kaptur Courts and the Regulations were issued by the Commander-in-Chief of the Union of Armed Struggle and approved by the Commander-in-Chief. The Code of Kaptur Courts allowed only the death penalty or acquittal.

Minor offences, not concerning ZWZ/AK soldiers but Polish citizens, were dealt with by the Civil Struggle (later Underground Struggle) Judgment Commissions, operating within the structures of the Civil Resistance Directorate and later the Underground Resistance Directorate. Their arsenal of punishments included infamy, reprimand (decisions on these two punishments were published in the underground press), admonition (informed about in a letter sent to the punished person), flogging (often for stealing property from Poles) and cutting hair (most often against women maintaining social relations with Germans). The last two sanctions were used mainly in villages, against people against whom other punishments might be ineffective, and were used extremely rarely.

The organization of the structure and tasks of the Justice Service were specified in the order concerning the Reconstruction of the Armed Forces (10 May 1941). The head of the WSS at the ZWZ-AK HQ, Colonel Konrad Zieliński "Karola", was subordinate to the Commander-in-Chief of the SZP-ZWZ-AK, and dealt with current matters with the Organizational Department I. During the period of conspiracy, the functions of the head of the WSS at the HQ and the head of the justice service were combined and this service was separated from the quartermaster division. The head of the justice service and at the same time the chairman of the WSS at the SZP-ZWZ-AK HQ was subordinate to the Commander-in-Chief through the head of the Organizational Department I. Department I provided administrative support (budget, premises, clandestine communication, etc.).

=== In the structure of the Home Army (AK) ===
On November 26, 1941, the Main Command of the Union of Armed Struggle completed the development of the Statute of Special Military Courts (SMC). After approval by the Staff of the Commander-in-Chief, the provisions of the new statute came into effect on January 1, 1942. The statute contained 13 articles. The first article specified the competences of the SMC: "For the prosecution of crimes specified in the applicable penal regulations, committed or attempted by military personnel after December 4, 1939, Special Military Courts are established at the Commander of the Home Army and at the District Commanders. The jurisdiction of the above courts also includes all cases concerning crimes (directly) threatening the security of the Home Army. The courts therefore covered members of the Home Army and professional soldiers before September 1939, as well as civilians acting to the detriment of the Home Army." (Note: These crimes included treason, denunciation, espionage, and crimes resulting from failure to comply with international agreements on waging war or occupying a country. Polish citizens were often convicted for joining the German army or German paramilitary organizations.)

Civil Special Courts (CSS) were also established, but this did not happen until 1942.

On July 21, 1943, the then Commander-in-Chief of the Home Army, General Tadeusz Bór-Komorowski, presented the government in London with a new statute of the WSS, which introduced two amendments. The WSS were to be established at the Commander of the Home Army (previously at the Command of the Armed Forces in the Country). If the prosecutor found that the accused did not deserve a punishment more severe than imprisonment, the possibility of suspending the proceedings was abolished.

== Criminal procedure ==
The WSS had the following entities under its jurisdiction: military personnel, civilians cooperating with the ZWZ–AK and other persons designated in special regulations. Until the establishment of the CSS at the Delegates in the individual WSS Districts, they dealt with all perpetrators of crimes. The WSS also considered all cases concerning the security of the underground, including the Armed Forces in the Country. According to the statute, the courts considered cases in a panel of 3 judges, among whom at least the presiding judge should be a professional judge "within the meaning of the act on the judicial system". The investigation began at the request of the prosecutor, acting on the orders of the AK Commander or AK district. The prosecutor collected evidence (documents, photographs, witness statements, expert opinions - usually graphologists) and made one of 3 decisions: to refuse to prosecute, to submit an indictment to the court or to suspend the proceedings. The trial was secret and took place without the presence of the accused, prosecutor, defense attorney or witnesses. The court had the right to summon the accused or witnesses, but this was done extremely rarely due to the requirements of conspiracy. The death penalty had to be imposed unanimously, other penalties – by an absolute majority vote. The verdict was subject to the approval of the AK Commander. If it was not approved, it lost its legal force and the commander appointed a new panel of judges. The verdict of the new panel was not subject to the approval of the commander. This resulted from the fact that the WSSs were based on summary proceedings introduced on 2 September 1939.

The reopening of legally concluded proceedings was possible when the verdict was based on false testimony or evidence, when an error occurred, and when new, previously unknown facts concerning the case appeared after the verdict was issued. An appeal against an excessively harsh sentence could be filed by the convicted person themselves (which was a purely theoretical possibility), their family or the prosecutor, who could also appeal the verdict to the detriment of the accused. It was also possible to suspend the proceedings, also until the end of the occupation.

Preventive executions were sometimes carried out when it was not possible to hold a court hearing (due to lack of time or the possibility of reprisals). In such situations, the verdicts were announced by the courts ex post.

The prosecution of crimes was primarily the responsibility of the Home Army counterintelligence (Department of Security and Counterintelligence (Department II of Information and Intelligence of the Home Army), and from autumn 1942 (formally from January 1943) also of the Kedyw. In 1943, the position of security officer was established at the Kedyw. These services also dealt with providing prosecutors and judges with information and evidence, as well as preliminary preparations for the execution of sentences. The execution of sentences was most often handled by the WSS at the Home Army HQ, Section 993/W (Referat 993/W).

== Implementation ==
According to the assumption, Special Military Courts were established in all areas and districts of the Home Army. During the Operation Storm, they were also established in mobilized units. In the individual districts, the situation was as follows:

- The WSS Warsaw District of the Home Army issued almost 300 death sentences, 80 were carried out. The WSS Home Army Headquarters issued about 100 death sentences. Based on the sentences published by the underground press, it is known that in the years 1942–1943 in Warsaw and in the Warsaw Area, death sentences were issued on 49 agents, informers and police informers.
- in the Kraków AK District – 47 people.
- At least 168 death sentences were issued in the Radom-Kielce District.
- 20 sentences were executed in the Lublin District of the Home Army.
- 13 informants, agents and informers were executed in Lviv.
- In Poznań AK District – 2 uncertain cases.
- In Łódź – 1 case.
- In the Vilnius District the AK WSS operated until spring 1945, sentencing several dozen traitors for collaboration with the Lithuanians (from October 1939 to June 1940), Germans and Soviets, 17 death sentences were carried out.

On a national scale:

- in the years 1940–1942, approximately 100–200 death sentences were carried out.
- In the period from January 1943 to June 1944, 2,015 agents and informants were executed under WSS sentences (1,246 in 1943 and 769 in the first half of 1944). These data do not include April 1943 (no data).
- From July 1944 to January 1945 (the Home Army was disbanded on January 19, 1945) – several dozen sentences (not including the Warsaw Uprising, during which at least 51 death sentences were issued, of which about 35 were executed).

Civilian Special Courts issued approximately 100-200 death sentences.

During World War II, underground courts in Poland considered about 5,000 cases. They issued 3,000–3,500 death sentences, of which about 2,500 were executed. The main charge for which the courts convicted the accused was informing, but also ordinary banditry, for which the Home Army executed 695 criminals in 1943 alone.

A number of WSS convictions were overturned and those convicted after the war were rehabilitated.

== Bibliography ==
- Kowalski, Paweł (2012). "Wojskowy Sąd Specjalny Komendy Okręgu Pomorze Armii Krajowej" (PDF). Biuletyn Fundacji generał Zofii Zawackiej. 24 (62). Toruń: 37–78. ISSN 1732-1913. Archived (PDF) from the original on March 6, 2016.
- Kania, Leszek (2010). "Organizacja i funkcjonowanie podziemnego wymiaru sprawiedliwości na Wileńszczyźnie w latach II wojny światowej (1940-1945)" (PDF). Studia Lubuskie. Sulechów: 49–85.
- B. Szyprowski, Prokurator w sądownictwie Polskiego Państwa Podziemnego, "Wojskowy Przegląd Prawniczy" 2012, no. 1–2, pp. 3–23.
