= Minor sabotage =

Small, nonviolent acts by the Polish underground to undermine the Nazi occupation

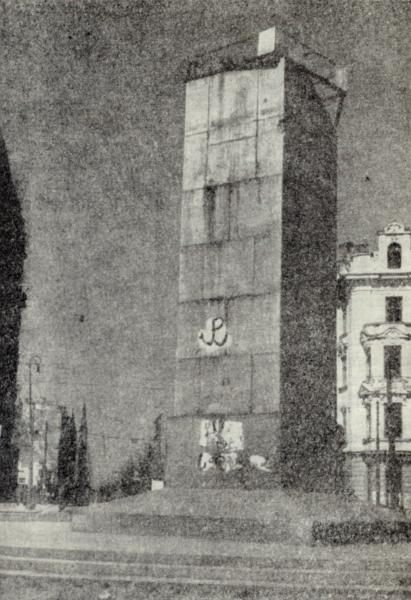
Kotwica graffito painted by Szare Szeregi on the remains of the Aviator Monument at Warsaw's Union of Lublin Square

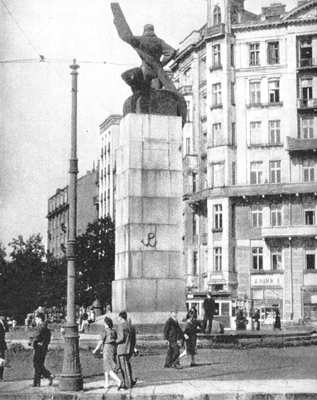
Kotwica graffito on Warsaw's Aviator Monument by "Rudy"

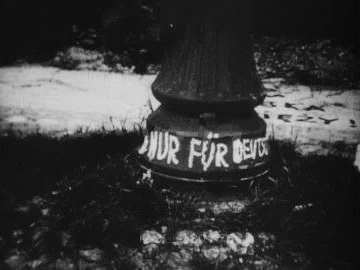
Slogan "Only for Germans" painted on the lamppost in Warsaw may suggest hanging the German Nazis here.

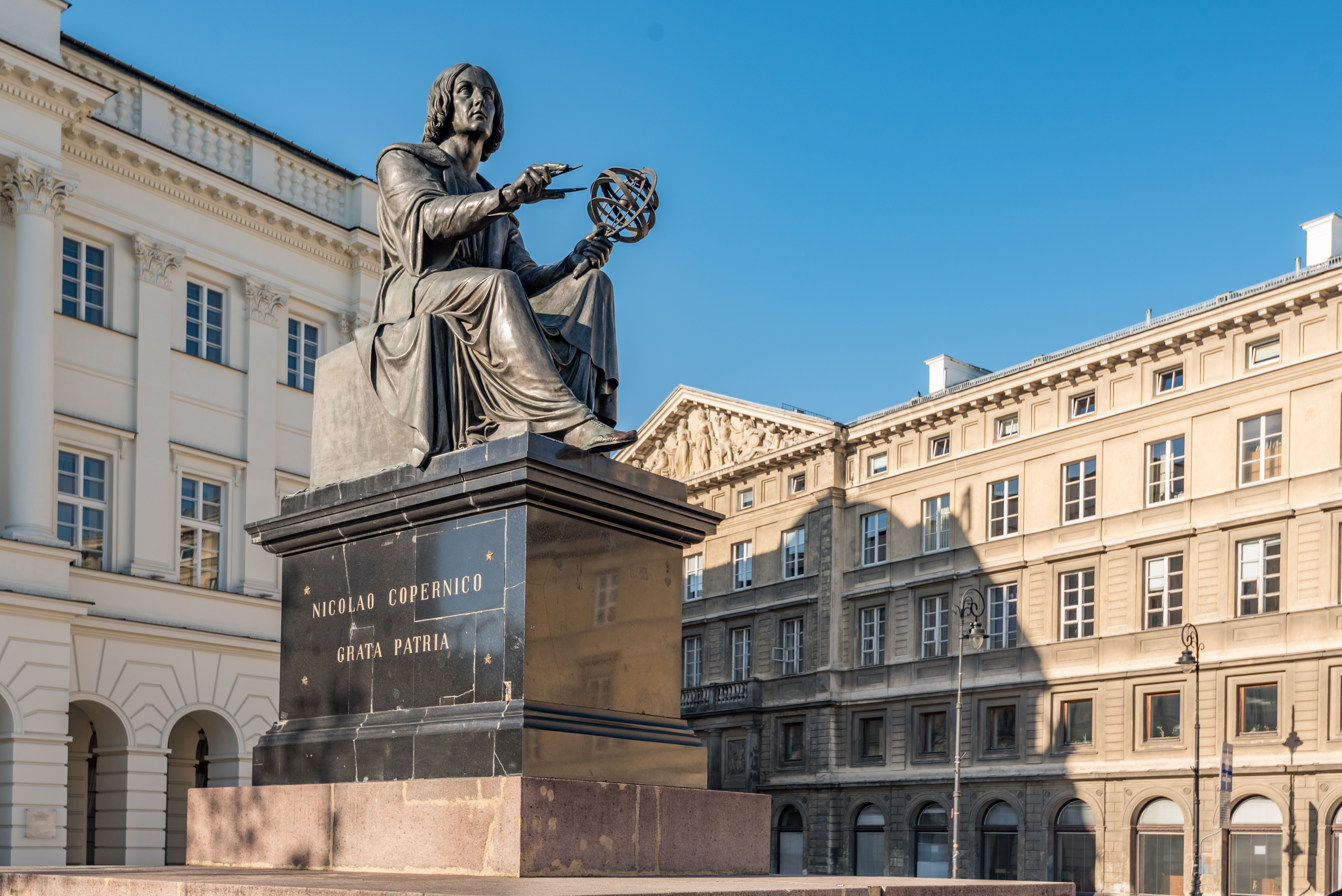
Warsaw's Nicolaus Copernicus monument was the target of a celebrated minor-sabotage operation.

A minor sabotage (a.k.a. little sabotage or small sabotage; Polish: mały sabotaż) during World War II in Nazi-occupied Poland (1939–45) was any underground resistance operation that involved a disruptive but relatively minor and non-violent form of defiance, such as the painting of graffiti, the manufacture of fake documents, the disrupting of German propaganda campaigns, and the like. Minor-sabotage operations often involved elements of humor.

The purpose of minor-sabotage operations was primarily psychological — to show Polish civilians that the resistance remained active, and thus bolster civilian morale, and to wear down the German occupier.

== History ==
In September 1939, during the German invasion of Poland, after the fall of Warsaw, a young Polish student, Elżbieta Zahorska, tore down a German poster. Soon after, she was executed for her act; her death, however, instead of cowing others, inspired an entire new branch of Polish resistance, called minor sabotage.

Several organizations dedicated to minor sabotage were created in 1939 and 1940, notably PLAN, Wawer and Palmiry. Minor sabotage was often carried out by scouting organizations such as Szare Szeregi. On a larger scale, it was coordinated by the Directorate of Civil Resistance of the Polish Underground State and, in some cases, by its military arm, the Home Army (see Operation N). Thousands were involved in minor sabotage. During two weeks in March and April 1942 when the kotwica symbol was introduced, it was painted all around Warsaw by a 400-strong dedicated team.

Aleksander Kamiński, a teacher and scouting activist, soon became a major figure in organizing such operations. In November 1940 he published an article in the main Polish underground newspaper, Biuletyn Informacyjny, explaining how to carry out such acts.

== Operations ==
Notable or common minor-sabotage operations included:

- painting pro-Polish and anti-Nazi graffiti. Common symbols included the kotwica ("anchor"—the symbol of the Polish underground) and the turtle (a symbol of work sabotage and inefficiency, to be implemented by those who worked—often forcibly—for the German occupier). Slogans included "Wawer pomścimy" ("We will avenge the Wawer massacre"), "Pawiak pomścimy" ("We will avenge the Pawiak [prison atrocities]"), and "Oświęcim" ("Auschwitz").
- inefficient, slow work and sabotage, when one was employed by the Germans
- misdirection, when asked for directions
- not acknowledging that one speaks German, and thus refusing to communicate with the Germans
- ignoring German demands or executing them only at the last possible moment
- harassing German occupiers and collaborators by sending threats or denouncing them as underground activists to German security forces
- counteracting German Nazi propaganda operations (for example, by altering German posters—such posters about advances in the Soviet Union were "amended" to the date 1812)
- tearing down and damaging German flags and putting up Polish flags for Polish anniversaries
- breaking windows in shops that displayed German symbols (for example, those of photographers who displayed photographs of German soldiers, and of shops that displayed signs in German)
- taking over German megaphone systems to broadcast Polish patriotic songs
- "Amending" German newspapers with Polish symbols; on occasion, issuing fake editions
- releasing stink bombs and the like in movie theaters that screened German propaganda films and newsreels, and putting up the Polish-language slogan, "Tylko świnie siedzą w kinie" ("Only swine watch the German line", literally "Only pigs sit in the theater")
- placing the German sign, "Nur für Deutsche" ("Only for Germans"), in selected sites such as cemeteries

A particularly notable operation was carried out by Maciej Aleksy Dawidowski on 11 February 1942. Soon after the Germans had occupied Warsaw in 1939, they had placed on the Nicolaus Copernicus Monument on Krakowskie Przedmieście a large plaque proclaiming Copernicus to have been a German astronomer. Dawidowski removed and concealed the German plaque. In response, the Germans moved Warsaw's statue of Jan Kiliński to the National Museum in Warsaw. Immediately, Dawidowski and his comrades retaliated by placing a large graffito on the Museum ("People of Warsaw—I am here. Jan Kiliński") and adding a new plaque to the Copernicus monument: "For removal of the Kiliński statue, I am extending the winter by two months. Kopernik." Even though most minor sabotage operations took place in Warsaw, they also were organized in other cities of occupied Poland, such as Częstochowa (painting anti-German graffiti, destruction of German signs, affixing of Polish posters), Kielce (defacing of German symbols on official signs, stamping newspapers with the Kotwica, painting of a large symbol of the Polish underground state on the tower of the Cathedral church), and Kraków (writing "Hitler Kaputt" on the walls, selling fake copies of the local daily "Goniec Krakowski").

== See also ==
- Operation Arsenal
