= Zofia Korbońska =

Polish resistance fighter and journalist

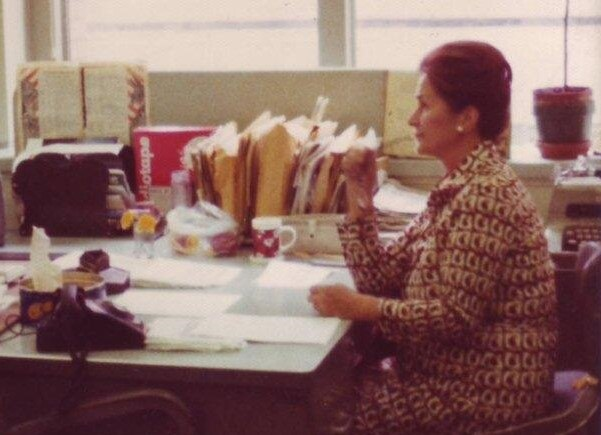
- Korbońska at the Voice of America during the 1970s
- Born: Zofia Ristau; May 10, 1915; Warsaw, Congress Poland
- Died: August 16, 2010 (aged 95); Washington, D.C., US
- Era: 20th century
- Political party: Polish People's Party
- Other political affiliations: People's Party
- Spouse: Stefan Korboński
- Parents: Wacław Ristau (father); Zenobia née Gryf-Kwiecińska (mother)
- Military career
- Allegiance: Polish government-in-exile
- Branch: Home Army
- Conflicts: Warsaw Uprising
- Awards: Order of Polonia Restituta

Zofia Korbońska, née Ristau (10 May 1915 in Warsaw – 16 August 2010 in Washington, D.C.) was a Polish resistance fighter and journalist.

She was born in Warsaw and graduated from the Maria Konopnicka High School and School of Political Sciences there. In 1938 she married a lawyer and Polish People's Party politician Stefan Korboński. During World War II, in 1941, she helped to organize the underground radio station, which sent the coded radio transmissions to the Polish government in exile. Her dispatches spread the news about German atrocities committed in Poland. As a member of Armia Krajowa, Korbońska eventually took part in the Warsaw Uprising of 1944. In June 1945, she was arrested by NKVD together with her husband. They were released after the creation of the Provisional Government of National Unity. In 1947, when her husband was in danger of another arrest, they fled together to Sweden hiding in a ship transporting coal. Since November 1947, they lived in the United States, where she worked in the Voice of America and Polish American Congress.

In 2006 she was given the title of honorary citizen of the Capital City of Warsaw. President of Poland Lech Kaczyński awarded her the Grand Cross of the Order of Polonia Restituta. She struggled with illness for a few years before her death on 16 August 2010. She was buried in the Polish Cemetery in Doylestown, Pennsylvania.
