= Nur für Deutsche =

German ethnocentric slogan

The slogan Nur für Deutsche (English: "Only for Germans") was a German ethnocentric slogan indicating that certain establishments, transportation and other facilities such as park benches, bars and restaurants were reserved exclusively for Germans. It was used during World War II in many German-occupied countries, especially Poland from 1939 until the defeat of Germany in 1945. Signs bearing the slogan were posted at entrances to parks, cafes, cinemas, theaters and other facilities. They were normally the best such facilities to show the indigenous population the alleged "superiority" of the Germans.

== History ==
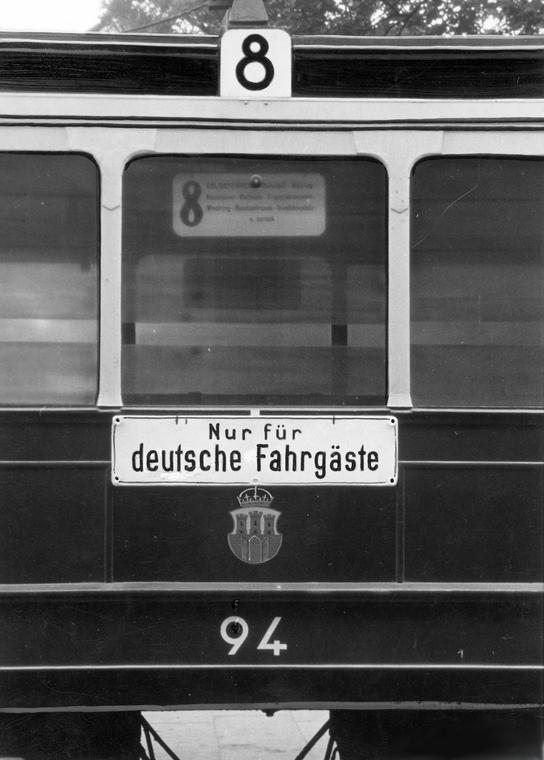
"Only for German passengers" on tram route 8, car no. 94 in occupied Kraków

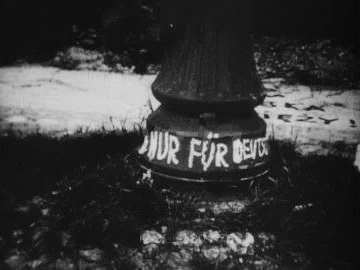
Nur für Deutsche resistance graffiti on the base of a lamppost in occupied Poland - implying that they are reserved for Germans to be lynched

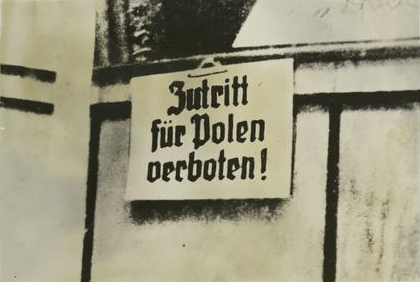
German warning written with fraktur in Nazi-occupied Poland 1939 – "No entrance for Poles!" (Ger.: "Zutritt für Polen verboten!")

In German-occupied Poland, racial segregation was nearly complete by 1940. In streetcars and trains, the first car was usually reserved for German administrative and military personnel, Nazi party members, and German civilians. Other nationalities were to use the remaining cars. Jews were refused any such usage. The segregation was repeated in other occupied countries, such as parts of the Soviet Union for example. It was another way to intimidate local people, in addition to imposition of legal constraints, curfews and unfair exchange rates. Jews were discriminated against in all occupied countries, as well as Germany itself, and some towns boasted of their judenfrei status. The constraints on Jews were the most severe of all, and they were refused ownership of cars, bicycles, radios and could go shopping only at limited times for example. They were forbidden to use park benches and then public parks at all, notices included "Juden verboten" were commonplace across Germany. Such restrictions were applied gradually in Germany from 1933 on, but much more rapidly following invasion of a country. Thus Austrian Jews suffered extreme restraints faster after the Anschluss in 1938, as did Poland from 1939 onwards after military conquest. The German attitude was based on its racial philosophy of being the "master race", to whom all other "races" were inferior, and thus to be exploited and enslaved.

Similar signage was used in South Africa during apartheid and in the United States during Jim Crow, where bus travel for example was racially segregated. Discriminating signage was also used informally in the UK, notably in signs in bed and breakfast accommodation barring Irish and blacks. Such signs are now illegal.

== Reaction ==
In Polish partisan parlance, toxic or otherwise undrinkable moonshine was jocularly called "nur für Deutsche". Partisans were also fond of painting the words "nur für Deutsche" on graveyard fences or street lampposts (a reference to hanging).

== See also ==
- No Irish, No Blacks, No Dogs
- Apartheid
- Dogs and Indians not allowed
- Ghetto benches
- History of Poland (1939–1945)
- Judenfrei
- Nazi eugenics
- Nazi Glossary
- No dogs and Chinese allowed
- Operation Ostra Brama
- Racial segregation
- Separate but equal
