= National Security Corps =

World War Two Polish underground police force

Państwowy Korpus Bezpieczeństwa (Polish for "National Security Corps", abbreviated PKB; sometimes also called Kadra Bezpieczeństwa, abbreviated KB) was a Polish underground police force organized under German occupation during World War II by the Polish Home Army and Government Delegation for Poland. It was trained as the core of a future police force for a planned Polish all-national uprising, and for after Poland's liberation. The Corps' first commander was Lt. Col. Marian Kozielewski. He was later replaced by Stanisław Tabisz. In October 1943 the PKB had 8,400 officers; by early 1944 the number had grown to almost 12,000.

The PKB was created by the Department of the Internal Affairs of the Delegate's Office in 1940, mostly from members of the pre-war Polish police and volunteers. PKB carried out investigation and criminal intelligence duties as well as gathered reports of the Gestapo and Kripo in the General Government. It enforced the verdicts prepared by the Directorate of Civil Resistance and Directorate of Underground Resistance and passed by the Underground court.

A unit of PKB commanded by Henryk Iwański purportedly distinguished itself during the Warsaw Ghetto Uprising in 1943. However, according to the work of a Polish-Israeli research team (Dr. Dariusz Libionka and Dr. Laurence Weinbaum), much of what Henryk Iwański wrote should be relegated to the realm of confabulation or manipulation of the Communist secret police.

== See also ==
- Workers' Militia PPS-WRN
