= Directorate of Covert Resistance =

Directorate of Covert Resistance (Polish Kierownictwo Walki Konspiracyjnej, short KWK) was one of the departments of the Armia Krajowa Headquarters created in Poland in 1942 during World War II. Its main task was commanding the so-called current fight. It included propaganda, organization of self-defence units, sabotage and diversion.

It was headed personally by the commander of the Armia Krajowa. The advisory body was composed of the commander of KeDyw, chief of Bureau of Information and Propaganda and an envoy of Directorate of Civil Resistance. In 1943 it was joined with the latter organization and formed the Directorate of Underground Resistance.
