= Directorate of Civil Resistance =

Polish resistance organisation during World War II

Directorate of Civil Resistance (Polish Kierownictwo Walki Cywilnej, short KWC) was one of the branches of the Polish Government Delegate's Office during World War II. Its main tasks were to maintain the morale of the Polish society, encourage passive resistance, report German atrocities and cruelties to the Polish Government in Exile, and to organize sabotage. In addition, it was responsible for the law and justice in occupied Poland.

It organized trials of traitors, collaborators and provocateurs as well as the most cruel members of the Wehrmacht, Gestapo and SS. The verdicts varied from boycott, fines, and lash to capital punishment. The trials were carried out by civil Underground court and the verdicts were enforced by the Państwowy Korpus Bezpieczeństwa. From 1942 on, the KWC also prosecuted crimes such as theft, rape, and murder.

The KWC was headed by Stefan Korboński. In 1943 it was joined with Directorate of Covert Resistance and formed the Directorate of Underground Resistance.

== See also ==
- small sabotage
