= Leopold Lewin =

Polish poet, journalist and translator

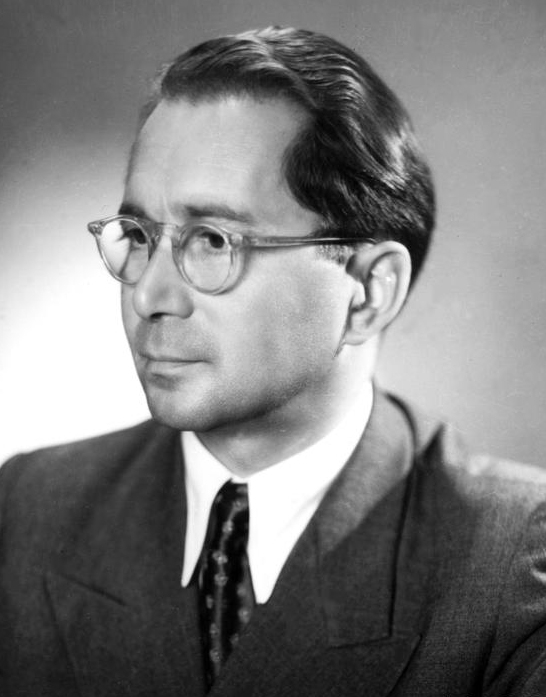
Leopold Lewin

Leopold Lewin (28 July 1910 in Piotrków Trybunalski – 7 December 1995 in Warsaw) was a Polish poet, journalist and translator. He graduated the Warsaw University in 1931. In the years 1939-1944 on emigration in USSR. Arrested by NKVD in June 1942, he later became a Polish communist, joining the Union of Polish Patriots there, and was an author of many socrealistic poems (like 'Song of United Parties' - 'Pieśń Partii Zjednoczonych'). After the war he was an editor of several Polish newspapers and the Secretary General of the Polish Literary Society.
