= Underground court =

World War II underground courts in occupied Poland

The underground courts (Polish: Sądy podziemne) were World War II secret courts in occupied Poland, organized by the Polish government-in-exile. The courts determined punishments for citizens of Poland who were subject to Polish law before the war.

== History ==
After the Polish Defense War of 1939, the German authorities of the General Government mobilized all the pre-war Polish policemen to the German service. The so-called Navy-Blue Police (Policja granatowa, nicknamed after the color of their uniforms) were used as an auxiliary unit of the Gestapo and Kripo, yet they had no means of executing law and order in the occupied country. At the same time, the German police forces and courts were more interested in persecution of Jews and members of the Polish intelligentsia and underground rather than common criminals.

First underground, ad hoc courts were created alongside some of the first Polish resistance organizations as early as in 1939. At first, they were purely military, concerned only with the cases that would fall under military law (such as treason). On 16 April 1940, the Polish government-in-exile in London decided that underground Polish courts be created for prosecution of criminals, traitors, informants and collaborators. The structure and law regulating those courts were mostly finalized around 1942.

The Underground Courts tried only the pre-war citizens of Poland who were legally subjects of the Polish law. No citizens of other states (including members of the occupying forces of Germany and the USSR) were ever sentenced by the Underground Courts. However, at times such claims were made by the Bureau of Information and Propaganda for propaganda reasons; nevertheless, executions of members of the SS and Gestapo were treated as elements of partisan warfare. The reason for such a policy was a belief that the Polish Underground State should act as if the occupation and dismemberment of Poland never happened.

Polish special Underground Courts reviewed about 10,000 to 17,000 cases of collaboration, and sentenced over 3,500 individuals to death (2,500 executions were carried out; many others were sentenced to punishments like beatings or fines, or with a recommendation for review of the case after the war).

Approximately 30% of the executions in Warsaw were of Poles found to blackmail or denounce the hiding Jews (szmalcowniks).

== See also ==
- Państwowy Korpus Bezpieczeństwa
- Operacja Główki
- Military Special Court
