= Directorate of Underground Resistance =

Polish civil resistance

Directorate of Underground Resistance (Polish: Kierownictwo Walki Podziemnej, KWP) was an agency of the Polish Underground State created during World War II.

== History ==
The Directorate of Underground Resistance was created in 1943 from the Directorate of Civil Resistance and the Directorate of Covert Resistance. It carried out tasks previously reserved for the two directorates.

The KWP was commanded collectively by the commander of the Home Army, its chief of staff, the commander of the KeDyw, the chief of the Bureau of Information and Propaganda, and a representative of the Government Delegation for Poland.
