= Polish Socialist Party – Freedom, Equality, Independence =

Political party in WWII

Polish Socialist Party – Freedom, Equality, Independence Polska Partia Socjalistyczna – Wolność, Równość, Niepodległość
- Abbreviation: PPS-WRN; WRN
- Chairman: Tomasz Arciszewski
- Secretary: Kazimierz Pużak
- Founded: November 19, 1939
- Dissolved: 1947
- Preceded by: Polish Socialist Party
- Succeeded by: Polish Social Democratic Party (1945)
- Paramilitary wing: Workers' Militia
- Ideology: Socialism; National independence Left-wing nationalism Antifascism
- Political position: Left-wing

The Movement of the Urban and Rural Working Masses – Freedom, Equality, Independence (Polish: Ruch Mas Pracujących Miast i Wsi – Wolność, Równość, Niepodległość), commonly known as Polish Socialist Party – Freedom, Equality, Independence (Polish: Polska Partia Socjalistyczna – Wolność, Równość, Niepodległość) and abbreviated as PPS-WRN or just WRN, was an underground organisation in occupied Poland during World War II set up by the activists of the Polish Socialist Party (PPS) and continuing its traditions. The party leadership used the name Central Leadership of the Movement (Polish: Centralne Kierownictwo Ruchu, CKR). Within the Political Consultative Committee, the organization used the code name "Koło" (lit. 'Circle').

The PPS had a long history of operating under underground conditions, primarily in the pre-1918 period, as part of the PPS Fighting Organization and the Polish Military Organization. In light of the expected war, the party's authorities made the first preparations for underground activity as early as 1934, which were made more specific in 1938 for the German occupation. The plan essentially called for the consolidation of all organizations affiliated with the PPS into the Union of Socialist Workers' Organizations. To this end, in 1939 the Supreme Council transferred all prerogatives and the right to direct the movement to the Central Executive Committee.

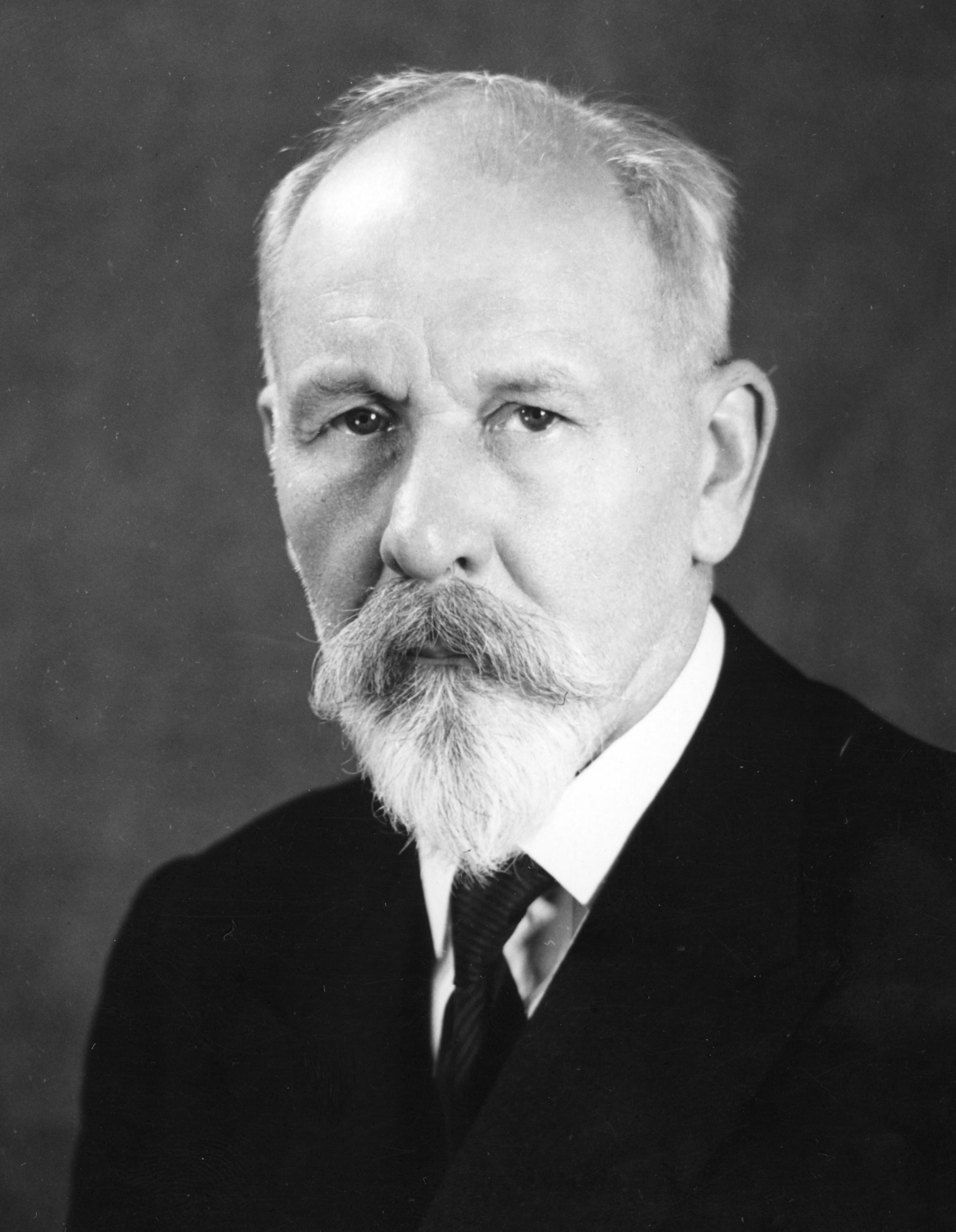
Tomasz Arciszewski, first chairman of the PPS-WRN, prime minister of Poland since 1944

The decision to freeze the activities of the PPS was made while the German invasion of Poland was still in progress. First, at the request of Zygmunt Zaremba by the Warsaw District of the Workers' Committee on September 26, 1939. Then on October 2 by three members of the party's Central Executive Committee – Mieczysław Niedziałkowski, Kazimierz Pużak and Zygmunt Zaremba. In reality, the party never intended to cease operations, only to go underground.

In mid-October, without the participation of Niedziałkowski, but probably with the participation of Tomasz Arciszewski, the group decided to form a cadre underground organization – WRN. This decision was confirmed at a conference of activists from all over Poland, which took place on November 19, 1939 in Helenów, near Warsaw. Despite the wide participation of activists from all over the country, only 3 of the 12 members of the Central Executive Committee (Arciszewski, Pużak and Zaremba) attended this meeting, although 6 others were still in the country, as were the chairman of the Supreme Council Zygmunt Żuławski, members of the Supreme Council Norbert Barlicki and Adam Próchnik, and a member of the Review Committee Stanisław Dubois. This state of affairs later became the basis for undermining the WRN's right to be the sole continuation of the PPS and sole representative of the labor movement.

The movement's established leadership in Helenów consisted of:

- Tomasz Arciszewski – chairman.
- Kazimierz Pużak – secretary.
- Zygmunt Zaremba – member.

The following were co-opted without voting rights:

- Bolesław Dratwa – treasurer
- Józef Dzięgielewski – representative of Warsaw.
- Józef Cyrankiewicz – representative of Kraków.
- Aleksy Bień (since autumn 1940).

The activities of the WRN were based on centralism, i.e. the unquestionability of the leadership's decisions. WRN activists organized themselves into five-person cells, which were subject to a hierarchical structure. At the same time, a military organization called the People's Guard WRN was established, headed by Kazimierz Pużak as the main commander, and Józef Dzięgielewski as the organiser. A separate formation was the Militia WRN, which had defensive tasks and was formed in workers' centers. The militia was commanded by Antoni Pajdak.

At the end of World War II, the name PPS was contested by PPS-WRN and the pro-communist Workers Polish Socialist Party (Robotnicza Partia Polskich Socjalistów). Eventually in 1947, most top PPS-WRN activists were arrested by Polish secret police, Urząd Bezpieczeństwa; the remains ceased political activity, emigrated or joined the communist party.

Its military formations included Gwardia Ludowa WRN and the Workers' Militia PPS-WRN.

== See also ==
- Polish Underground State
- Polish resistance in World War II

== Bibliography ==
- Ciesielski, Stanisław (1986). Niepodległość i socjalizm [Independence and Socialism] (in Polish). Warsaw.
- Duraczyński, Eugeniusz (1978). "Socjaliści polscy 1939-1941 (próba charakterystyki postaw i tendencji politycznych)" [Polish Socialists 1939-1941 (attempt to characterise political attitudes and tendencies)]. Dzieje Najnowsze. 10 (2).
- Żuczkowski, Maciej (2014). "Gwardia Ludowa Polskiej Partii Socjalistycznej i Oddziały Wojskowe Powstańczego Pogotowia Socjalistów w wojskowych strukturach Polskiego Państwa Podziemnego". Okupowana Europa. Podobieństwa i różnice.
