= Tomasz Arciszewski =

Polish socialist politician (1877–1955)

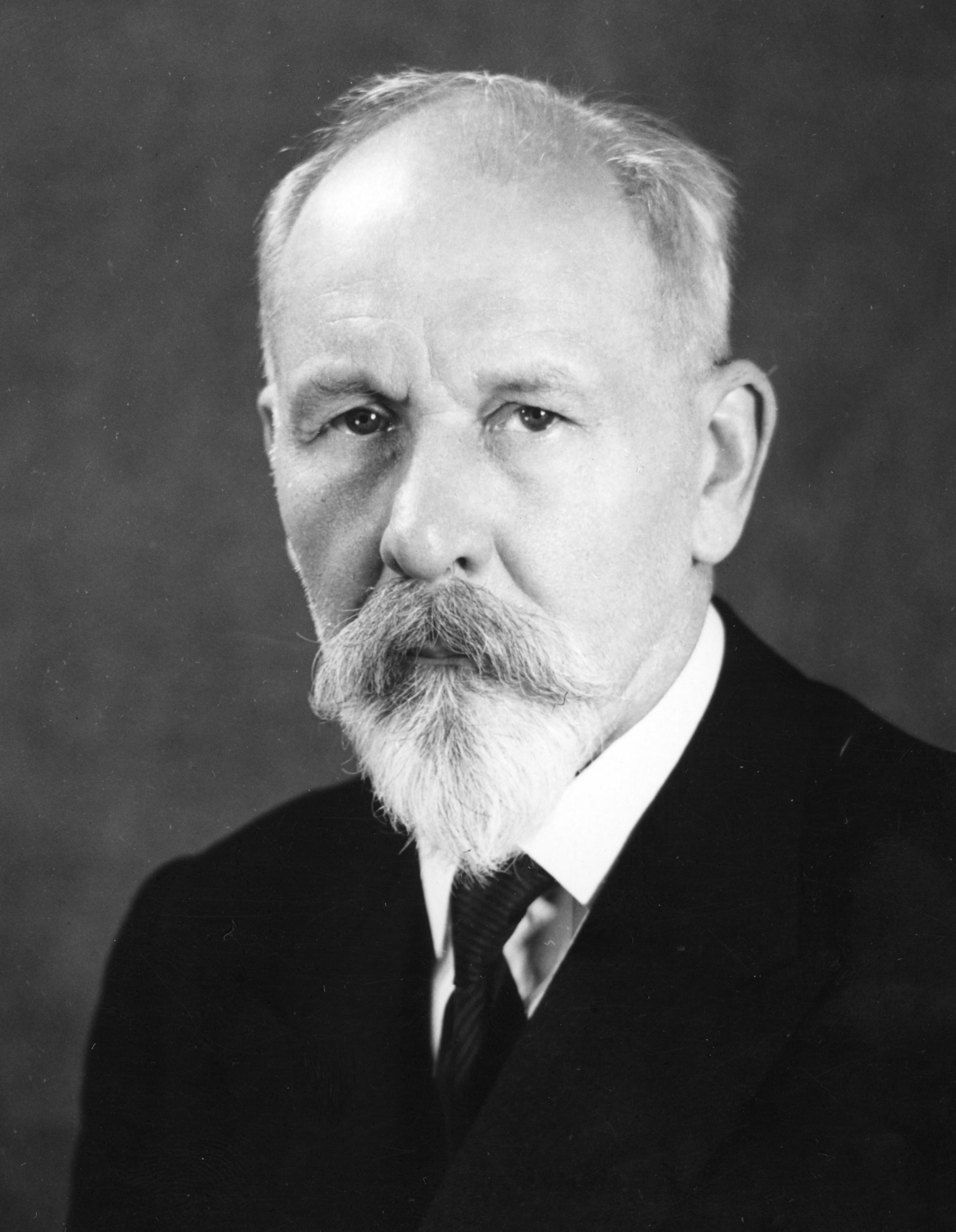
- Arciszewski in 1944

Prime Minister of Poland
- In exile 29 November 1944 – 2 July 1947
- President: Władysław Raczkiewicz; August Zaleski
- Deputy: Jan Kwapiński; Jan Stanisław Jankowski
- Counterparts in country: Edward Osóbka-Morawski; Józef Cyrankiewicz
- Preceded by: Stanisław Mikołajczyk
- Succeeded by: Edward Osóbka-Morawski (As Prime Minister of the Second Polish Republic); Tadeusz Bór-Komorowski (As Prime Minister in exile)

Personal details
- Born: 4 November 1877 Sierzchowy, Piotrków Governorate, Congress Poland
- Died: 20 November 1955 (aged 78) London, United Kingdom
- Party: Polish Socialist Party

Tomasz Stefan Arciszewski (Polish pronunciation: [ˈtɔmaʂ art͡ɕiˈʂɛfskʲi]; 4 November 1877 – 20 November 1955) was a Polish socialist politician, a member of the Polish Socialist Party and the 31st Prime Minister of Poland, 3rd Prime Minister of the Polish government-in-exile in London from 1944 to 1947 during which the government lost the recognition of the Western powers.

== Early life ==
Tomasz Stefan Arciszewski was born in Sierzchowy, a tiny town halfway between Warsaw and Łódź, to Mikołaj Arciszewski, a veteran of the January Uprising, and Helena Młynarska.

After graduating from trade schools in Lubań and Radom, Tomasz Arciszewski moved to Sosnowiec, an ever-growing centre of heavy industry of the region of Zagłębie. There in 1894, at the age of 17, he started working as a factory worker in a steel foundry, and first met social justice activists. In 1896 he joined the Polish Socialist Party (PPS) and soon afterwards took part in strike action, for which he was fired.

== Career ==
Initially active in Zagłębie, he had to flee the country and between 1898 and 1900 he lived in London and Bremen, where he was one of the leaders of the Association of Polish Socialists in Exile. Despite being endangered with arrest by the tsarist police, Arciszewski returned to Poland in August 1900 and was arrested soon afterwards.

Released in 1903, Arciszewski returned to active service in the ranks of the socialists. He became one of the PPS' members used to develop the organization and structures of illegal party in poorly developed areas of Poland. He spent some time in Częstochowa, Piotrków and in the poorly developed region of Podlaskie.

In 1904 he joined the Combat Organization of the Polish Socialist Party, a revolutionary group fighting for the liberation of Poland. A close associate of Józef Piłsudski, Arciszewski moved to Warsaw, where he became the head of the local branch of his organization. With it, he organized a number of assassination attempts of various Russian high-ranking officials. He also took part in the famous Bezdany raid near Vilna (Vilnius, Lithuania), where his unit expropriated circa 200,000 roubles.

In 1906 Arciszewski, along with Piłsudski, joined the newly found Polish Socialist Party - Revolutionary Faction, an organization of the Polish socialists oriented towards the independence of Poland rather than all-European workers' revolution. After the action of Bezdany he had to flee the Privislinsky Krai and settled in Lwów (now Lviv, Ukraine), where he joined the Association of Active Struggle, a secret para-military organization. Shortly before the outbreak of the Great War he left the Revolutionary Faction and became a member of the internal opposition within the socialist movement.

In August 1914 he joined the Polish Legions and served with distinction in the 1st Infantry Regiment of the 1st Brigade. Promoted to the rank of Lieutenant, in 1915 he was delegated to political service in the Central Powers'-occupied Congress Poland, where he was among the most active organizers of the secret Polish Military Organization (POW). After the Act of 5 November and the proclamation of the Kingdom of Poland as part of the Central Powers' plan of Mitteleuropa, Tomasz Arciszewski entered the city council of Warsaw. There he became the founder of trade unions and the editor of various socialist newspapers.

After the collapse of Germany and Austria-Hungary at the end of World War I, on 7 November 1918 Arciszewski was appointed the minister of labour and social affairs in the Provisional Government of the Polish Republic led by Ignacy Daszyński. After Daszyński's government passed its responsibilities to Piłsudski and the consolidation of power in all parts of Poland occurred, Arciszewski was appointed the minister of postal services and telegraphic communication in the government of Jędrzej Moraczewski. He served at that post until 16 January 1919. Soon afterwards he was elected a member of the Sejm.

During the Polish-Bolshevik War he organized various workers' voluntary units and supported the sabotage beneath Russian lines. After the war, in 1922 he was again elected member of the Sejm from the Socialist lists and held his post until 1935.

One of the most prominent leaders of the socialists (between 1919 and 1939 he was the member of the Main Council of the PPS), Arciszewski gradually broke up with his former colleague Piłsudski, who abandoned the socialist ideas after Poland regained her independence. This made him one of the prominent leaders of the Centrolew coalition of centrist and leftist parties. Apart from his seat in the Sejm, between 1919 and 1934, and then from 1938 until the outbreak of World War II, Arciszewski was a member of the Warsaw's city council. Among other duties, he was also the founder of the Workers' Society of Friends of Children.

After the outbreak of the Invasion of Poland of 1939, Arciszewski took part in the defense of Warsaw as one of the commanders of the Workers' Volunteer Battalions. After the German and Soviet take-over of Poland he went underground and, together with Kazimierz Pużak, on 16 October of the same year he proclaimed the Polish Socialist Party – Freedom, Equality, Independence (PPS-WRN), a secret war-time continuation of the pre-war PPS. He headed that party until July 1944. After that he entered the Council of National Unity (RJN), a quasi-parliament of the Polish Secret State headed by Jan Stanisław Jankowski.

Shortly before the outbreak of the Warsaw Uprising, Arciszewski was evacuated from Poland through an air bridge (Most III) on 26 July 1944. Through Cairo he reached London, where he was one of the candidates for the seat of the president of Poland in exile. In accordance with the April Constitution of 1935, on 7 August 1944 he was named by Władysław Raczkiewicz as his successor.

Critical towards the pressure of the Soviet Union and Stanisław Mikołajczyk's attempts at compromise with Joseph Stalin, Arciszewski focused on trying to convince the Allied leaders (notably Winston Churchill) to help fighting Warsaw – to little avail. After Mikołajczyk's resignation, on 29 November 1944, Arciszewski became the Prime Minister of Poland and at the same time he became the minister of labour and welfare in his government.

He died on 20 November 1955 at aged 78, and is buried in Brompton Cemetery, London.

Political offices
Preceded by Stanislaw Mikolajczyk	Prime Minister of the Polish Republic in Exile; 1944–1947	Succeeded by Edward Osóbka-Morawski (Prime Minister of the Communist Government in Poland) or Tadeusz Bór-Komorowski (Prime Minister of the Polish Republic in Exile)
