= Home Council of Ministers =

The Home Council of Ministers (Polish: Krajowa Rada Ministrów) was a part of the Polish Government in Exile residing in occupied Poland. It was established by decree of the president of Poland on 3 May 1944 and headed by the Government Delegate for Poland.

It was the top executive of the Polish Underground State, created on 26 July 1944 from the Government Delegation for Poland. The Government Delegate, Jan Stanisław Jankowski, then became deputy prime minister and with tow other ministers led the Home Council of Ministers. It was divided into departments representative of pre-war Polish ministries and other offices. Most of its members, including Jankowski, were arrested on 27 March 1945 by NKVD and sentenced in the Trial of the Sixteen. The remaining leaders of the Underground State decided not to recreate the Council.
