= Zbigniew Stypułkowski =

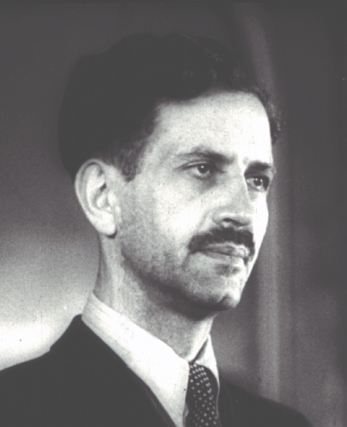
Zbigniew Stypułkowski

Zbigniew Stypułkowski (26 March 1904 – 30 March 1979) was a Polish lawyer and politician, Member of the Council of National Unity. He was sentenced by the Soviets in the infamous Trial of the Sixteen in 1945.

== Biography ==
In 1944 he took part in the Warsaw Uprising. In March 1945, he was arrested by the NKVD and brought to Moscow. After 3 months of interrogations, he was sentenced to 4 months in prison in a staged trial of 16 leaders of the Polish Underground State held by the Soviet Union in Moscow. In August he came back to Poland. Fearing arrest, he escaped from Poland in November 1945.

The arrest, imprisonment, and trial of Polish leaders is described in his 1951 book Invitation to Moscow. The book was soon translated into French (Invitation à Moscou), Italian (Invito a Mosca), Portuguese (Convite de Moscobo), Spanish (Invitation a Moscou), Burmese and Arabic. The Polish version of the book was published outside Poland in 1951 (W zawierusze dziejowej). In 1991 the book was re-published in Warsaw. Hugh Trevor-Roper, professor at the University of Oxford, wrote that the book was "of unique value" and that "there is no other evidence known to me from which we can learn, as here, the psychology and method behind these Communist trials". He died and was buried in London.

In 1927 Stypułkowski married Aleksandra Rabska, a fellow lawyer and legal partner and later, a notable émigré political commentator and activist. They had a son, Andrzej, who also became an émigré activist in the United Kingdom.

== Selected bibliography ==
=== Works available in English ===
- Invitation to Moscow (London 1951), with a preface by Hugh Trevor-Roper

== Cultural Depictions ==
The film, I Am Not Alone, depicts Stypułkowski's story during his incarceration at the Lubyanka prison.
