= Kazimierz Pużak =

Polish politician (1883–1950)

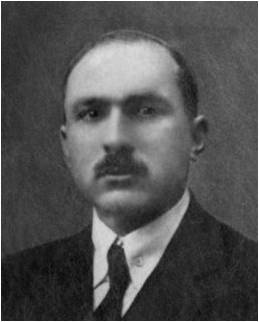
- Kazimierz Pużak

Member of the Sejm
- In office 1922–1935

Personal details
- Born: August 26, 1883 Tarnopol, Austria-Hungary
- Died: April 30, 1950 (aged 66) Rawicz, Poland
- Party: Polish Socialist Party
- Occupation: Politician

Kazimierz Pużak (1883–1950) was a Polish socialist politician of the interwar period. Active in the Polish Socialist Party, he was one of the leaders of the Polish Secret State and Polish resistance, sentenced by the Soviets in the infamous Trial of the Sixteen in 1945.

== Biography ==
Born on 26 August 1883 in a family of Ukrainian origins in Tarnopol, he studied law in Lwów University but dropped his studies to become a full-time political activist. He joined the Polish Socialist Party around 1904 and was the cofounder, together with Józef Piłsudski, of Polish Socialist Party - Revolutionary Faction (Polska Partia Socjalistyczna - Frakcja Rewolucyjna) in 1905.

A member of the Combat Organization of the Polish Socialist Party, in 1909 together with Henryk Minkiewicz he participated in the assassination of a provocateur and police agent Edmund Taranowicz. In 1911 arrested by the Russian Empire government for activism in the Polish revolutionary and pro-independence movement, he was sentenced to 8 years of katorga and exile in Siberia afterwards. For a time he was imprisoned in Shlisselburg Fortress. He was released during the Russian Revolution of 1917, in which he briefly participated.

Pużak returned to activism in the PPS after 1918, becoming one of its leading activists. From 1921 to 1939 he was the Secretary General of the Central Executive Committee of PPS. He served as one of the secretaries in the government of Jędrzej Moraczewski and became known—despite his socialist background—as a relative conservative, opposing some of most radical demands of the workers (supported by the communists). He opposed the escalation of the Polish-Soviet War, and supported the Silesian Uprisings. Elected as a deputy to Sejm (Polish parliament) in all elections from 1919 to 1935, first from Zagłębie Dąbrowskie region, later from Częstochowa, he often negotiated with the workers in those regions and supported their strikes.

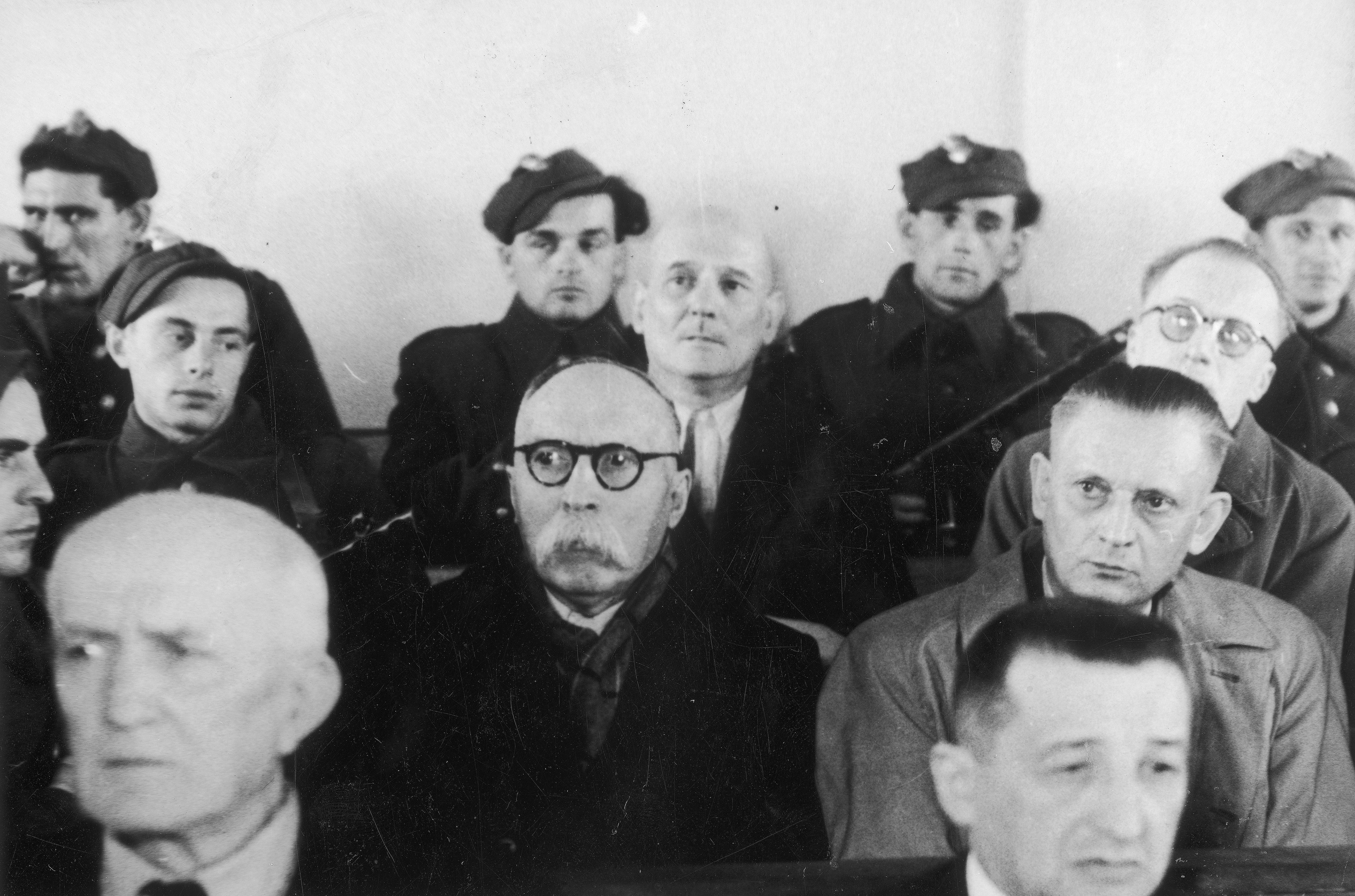
Photo from the trial of Kazimierz Pużak and other leaders of PPS-WRN, 1948

He participated in underground Polish political life in occupied Poland during World War II. In 1939 Pużak became one of the founders of the underground Polish Socialist Party (Polska Partia Socjalistyczna), the PPS-WRN (Polish Socialist Party - Liberty Equality Independence or Polska Partia Socjalistyczna - Wolność, Równość, Niepodległość). He was commander-in-chief of Gwardia Ludowa WRN (People's Guard WRN) which was the military organization of the PPS. He was PPS representative in the underground Main Political Council (Główna Rada Polityczna). Since 1940 he was a member of the Political Consultative Committee (Polityczny Komitet Porozumiewawczy) at Union of Armed Struggle (Związek Walki Zbrojnej, ZWZ). He was head of the Council of National Unity (Rada Jedności Narodowej) since 1944. He played a decisive role in formulating the programmatic declaration "What the Polish nation is fighting for?", strongly opposing any cooperation with the communists. In May 1944 nominated for vice-president, but he declined, refusing to leave Poland.

During the Warsaw Uprising (August 1–October 1, 1944)—which he criticized before it was started—Pużak was in Warsaw. After the capitulation of the capital, he left the city together with the civil population and continued his underground activities.

After the Soviet forces drove the Germans from Polish territories, NKVD general Ivan Serov invited Polish underground leaders for negotiations to discuss the aftermath of the Yalta Agreement. Pużak suspected deceit but nonetheless decided to attend to show the willingness of the resistance to work within the Yalta framework. He was promptly arrested by the Soviets, together with fifteen other Polish leaders. In the Trial of the Sixteen, which took place in Moscow in 1945, he was sentenced to 18 months in prison. Released in November 1945 after an amnesty, he refused to emigrate and instead elected to stay in Poland and continue his activity in the anti-communist opposition. During that time, he wrote his memoirs (Wspomnienia 1939-1945, published in Paris in 1977). Pużak was again arrested by the Urząd Bezpieczeństwa in 1947 and 1948. After another show trial against leaders of the PPS-WRN, he was sentenced to 10 years in prison, which was later reduced to five years' imprisonment. Pużak died in prison in Rawicz on April 30, 1950, and was secretly buried in Powązki Cemetery.

During World War II, he was awarded with Virtuti Militari (V class) and posthumously with the Armia Krajowa Cross by the Polish government in exile. In post-communist Poland in 1996, he was posthumously decorated with the Order of the White Eagle.
