= Government Delegation for Poland =

Agency of the Polish Government in Exile during World War II

The Government Delegation for Poland (Polish: Delegatura Rządu Rzeczypospolitej Polskiej na Kraj) was an agency of the Polish Government in Exile during World War II. It was the highest authority of the Polish Secret State in occupied Poland and was headed by the Government Delegate for Poland, a de facto deputy Polish Prime Minister.

The Government Delegation for Poland was intended as the first provisional government of war torn Poland until the Exiled Polish Government could safely return from abroad to a liberated Poland.

== History ==
Initially, there were two Delegations formed, one for the Polish areas annexed by Germany, and one for the General Government. A delegate for the Polish areas annexed by the Soviet Union was never appointed. From 1942, power was consolidated and there was only one delegate chosen, in the rank of deputy prime minister. He, in turn, had 6 deputies for each of the regions, whose responsibilities were further delegated to county-level officers. In July 1944, the delegate's three deputies were promoted to ministers, and a Home Council of Ministers (Krajowa Rada Ministrów) was created. The Home Council became the local counterpart of the Polish Government in Exile.

The Delegation's political body was the Political Consultative Committee (Polityczny Komitet Porozumiewawczy), a council comprising 4 main political parties. On 21 March 1943 it was renamed the Home Political Representation (Krajowa Reprezentacja Polityczna) and became an underground coalition parliament, comprising members of the Polish Socialist Party, National Party, People's Party and Labor Party. It became the controlling body of the Delegation and the Headquarters of the Home Army (Armia Krajowa). On 9 January 1944 it was turned into a Council of National Unity (Rada Jedności Narodowej), the parliament of underground Poland.

During Operation Tempest, in 1944, the council's local representatives and local Home Army commanders, as the representatives of the legitimate Polish government and the Polish Army, emerged from underground and welcomed the advancing Red Army. Despite several instances of successful cooperation with the Soviet Union, most of the Polish representatives and commanders were soon arrested by the NKVD and sent to Russian prisons or to the Gulag.

During the Warsaw Uprising, the central Government Delegation for Poland likewise came out of hiding and began acting officially as the Polish parliament in the liberated areas of Poland. After the Uprising's suppression, most of the Delegation's members left Warsaw with the civilian population and managed to evade the Germans. However, contact with local branches in Soviet- and German-occupied areas was broken.

In February 1945, the Government Delegation, including most members of the Council of National Unity and the Home Army Commander-in-Chief, were invited by Soviet General Ivan Serov to a conference on their eventual inclusion in the Soviet-backed Provisional Government. They were promised safe conduct beforehand but immediately arrested by the NKVD, and brought to Moscow, where they were brutally tortured for several months and tried in a staged Trial of the Sixteen. All perished. Meanwhile, in Poland, the Delegation was reconstructed and continued in its duties until finally disbanded on 1 July 1945.

== Departments ==
The Delegation's activities encompassed all areas of organized society. It comprised 12 branches, roughly corresponding to the ministries of the Polish government-in-exile in London.

1. Internal Affairs:
  - Security of the Delegation
  - Provisional Administration - shadow administration to take over the administrative duties after liberation or during an all-national uprising
  - Państwowy Korpus Bezpieczeństwa -underground police
  - Council to Aid the Jews
  - preparing reports on the situation in occupied Poland
2. Information and Press:
  - providing the society with news from abroad
  - propaganda
  - printing Rzeczpospolita, the official organ of the Office
3. Labour and Social Affairs:
  - cooperation with Polish Red Cross and Central Welfare Council
4. Education and Culture:
  - Organisation of the Underground schools and universities
5. Industry and Trade
6. Agriculture
7. Justice
8. Liquidation of the Effects of the War
9. Public Works and Reconstruction
10. Treasury
11. Post Offices and Telegraphs
12. Communications.

Near the end of the war, the Departments of Foreign Affairs and of War Matters were created, but they have not played any significant role.

Other notable units and bureaus included:

- Bureau of the Newly Acquired Lands (Polish Biuro Ziem Nowych):
  - Established 1942. The Bureau's main task was to document the Polish claims on German lands east of the Oder river and the area of Prussia, as well as planning of their post-war development. Despite the Allies agreement to grant Poland with the lands east of the Oder–Neisse line, the plans of the bureau were never fulfilled since most of its workers were arrested by the NKVD and sent to Gulags across Russia (see, however, Recovered Territories).
- Kierownictwo Walki Cywilnej (Directorate of Civil Resistance) (since 1941).

With regard to territorial structure, there were:

- in General Government:
  - Regional Delegation for Kielce
  - Regional Delegation for Kraków
  - Regional Delegation for Lublin
  - Regional Delegation for Warsaw-City
  - Regional Delegation for Warsaw-voivodeship
- in the Polish territories annexed by Nazi Germany:
  - Regional Delegation for Ciechanów
  - Regional Delegation for Łódź
  - Regional Delegation for Pomorze (Pomerania) in Toruń
  - Regional Delegation for Poznań
  - Regional Delegation for Śląsk (Silesia) in Katowice
- in the Polish territories annexed by the Soviet Union:
  - Regional Delegation for Białystok
  - Regional Delegation for Lwów (Lviv)
  - Regional Delegation for Nowogródek (Navahrudak)
  - Regional Delegation for Polesie
  - Regional Delegation for Wilno (Vilnius)
  - Regional Delegation for Wołyń (Volhynia)

== See also ==
- World War II
- Participants in World War II
- List of Government Delegates for Poland
- Armed Forces Delegation for Poland

== Bibliography ==
- Waldemar Grabowski (1995). Delegatura Rządu Rzeczypospolitej Polskiej na Kraj. Warsaw: Pax. p. 293. ISBN 83-211-1392-3.
- Stanisław Dzięciołowski (2004). Parlament Polski Podziemnej 1939-1945 (in Polish). Warsaw: Chancellery of the Sejm and Sejm Press. p. 258. ISBN 83-7059-665-7.
- Grzegorz Ostasz, The Polish Government-in-Exile's Home Delegature
