= People's Guard WRN =

Polish socialist partisan organisation during WW2

- Gwardia Ludowa WRN
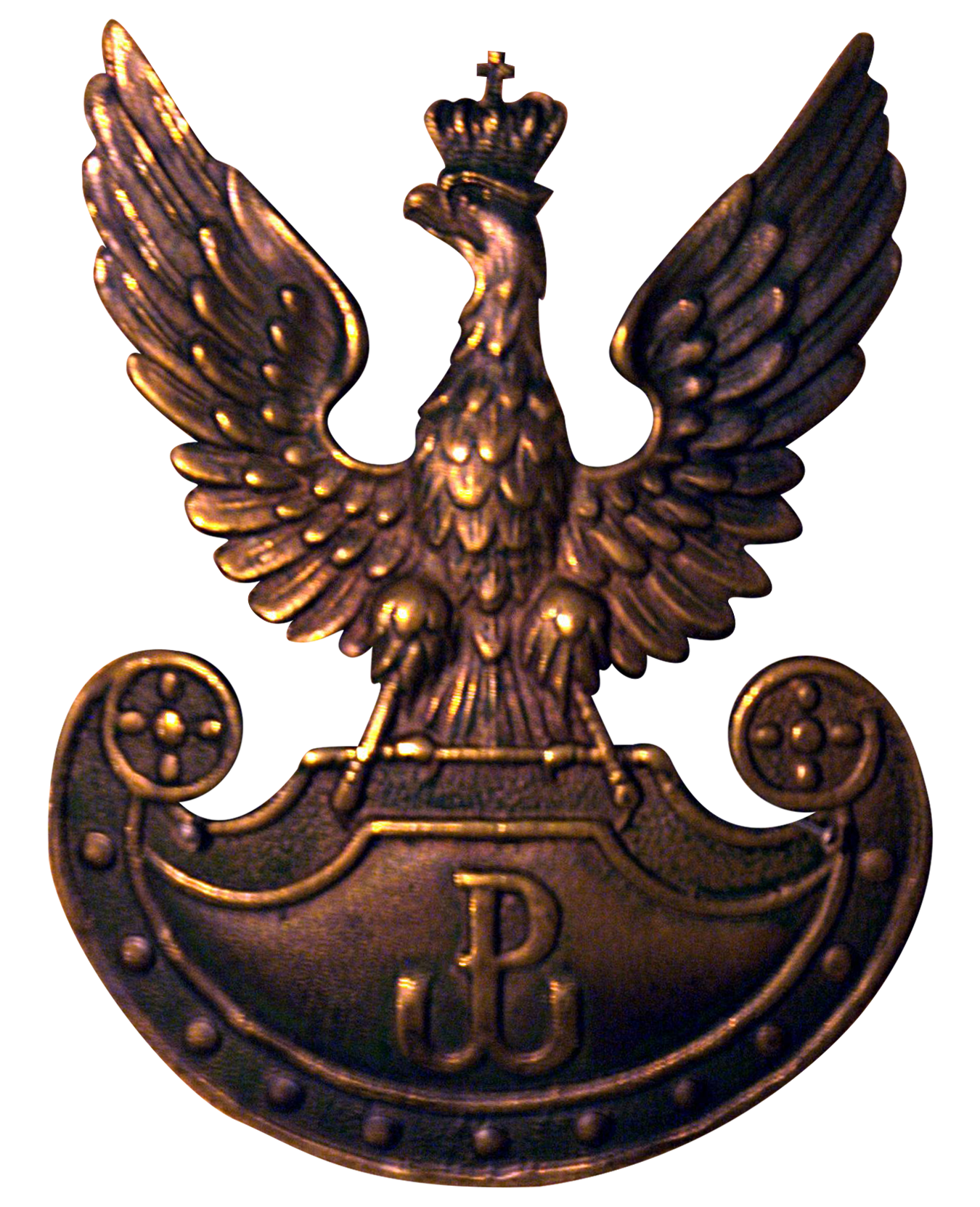
- Other name: OW PPS (from May 1944)
- Leader: Kazimierz Pużak
- Dates active: 1939–1945
- Merger of: Formacje Bojowo-Milicyjne Polskich Socjalistów (1943)
- Country: General Government
- Allegiance: WRN
- Ideology: Socialism
- Political position: Anti-Nazism
- Size: 42,000
- Part of: ZWZ

People's Guard WRN was a mainstream socialist military organization; to learn more about the communist pro-Soviet formation see People's Guard (1942–1944).

People's Guard WRN (Polish: Gwardia Ludowa WRN; GL WRN) and from May 1944 the Military Units of the Uprising Emergency of Socialists (Polish: Oddziały Wojskowe Pogotowia Powstańczego Socjalistów; OW PPS) was a military branch of the underground Polish Socialist Party WRN, and part of the Polish resistance movement in World War II. Created in 1939 by the WRN faction, since 1940 it was subordinated to ZWZ (name changed to Home Army (AK) in 1942) with a degree of autonomy.

In 1944 Gwardia Ludowa WRN numbered about 42,000 people. It was disbanded in early 1945. Together with the Home Army proper, the People's Guard WRN did try, and on a small scale succeeded ( in some remote areas only), in providing the Polish citizens with the Polish Underground Police and court system independent from that of the Nazi German occupant. The main commander of the People's Guard WRN was Kazimierz Pużak.
