= Workers' Militia of the Polish Socialist Party – Freedom, Equality, Independence =

Socialist paramilitary during WWII

Workers' Militia of the PPS-WRN
- Milicja Robotnicza PPS-WRN; MR PPS-WRN
- Other name: Militia PPS-WRN
- Leader: Antoni Pajdak
- Founded: 1939
- Dissolved: 1945
- Country: General Government
- Allegiance: Polish Underground State
- Ideology: Democratic socialism
- Political position: Anti-Nazi
- Size: 30,000
- Part of: PPS-WRN

The Workers' Militia of the Polish Socialist Party – Freedom, Equality, Independence (Polish: Milicja Robotnicza Polskiej Partii Socjalistycznej–Wolność, Równość, Niepodległość, MR PPS-WRN; often referred to simply as Militia PPS-WRN) was a Polish underground paramilitary formation of the Polish Socialist Party – Freedom, Equality, Independence active during the occupation of Poland by Nazi Germany during World War II between 1939 and 1945. The total number of clandestine members of the MR PPS-WRN reached 30,000 at the time of the Soviet counter-offensive of 1944. They participated in both Operation Tempest against the Nazis and in the Warsaw Uprising of 1944. MR PPS-WRN was created in November 1939 out of the pre-war labour circles in Warsaw, Radom, Kraków, in Upper Silesia and in the Dąbrowa Basin mainly for self-protection. It was intended to help recreate the Polish pre-war police and counter—intelligence services.

From June 1940 the Commander-in-chief of the MR PPS-WRN was Antoni Pajdak (nom de guerre Traugutt) captured by the NKVD in March 1945 and sent to the Gulag following the Trial of the Sixteen. His second-in-command in occupied Poland were: Stanisław Sobolewski (nom de guerre Krystian), and Jan Władysław Wilczyński (nom de guerre Gnat). The organization was divided and subdivided into units of five.

== MR PPS-WRN in Silesia and in Zagłębie ==
According to fragmentary data in Sosnowiec in 1944, the MR PPS-WRN counted 475 members in five districts. In Będzin County, it was around 200 persons strong or 15 platoons. In Silesia, the Militia counted around 3,000, and in the Cieszyn Silesia around 960. In addition, PPS tried to create industrial militia in Zagłębie, under the command of Stefan Kura-Granicki "Gromek", "Gołąb", "Oset", and later, under Henryk Żmijewski "Kuba". The Industrial Militia operated within the military factories gathering the intelligence and committing acts of sabotage as well as, later on, tried to prevent demolition of factories by the withdrawing Germans.

== Status report for the organization as of 1944 ==
District division	Membership	Regional commanders
Silesia	6,320	Wincenty Balicki "Belka", Józef Kalisz "Józef"
Kraków	6,181	Jan Wcisło "Dąb", Saturnin Nowakowski "Marian"
Radom	3,212	Stefan Heine "Lach", Jan Siemek "Korab"
Zagłębie Dąbrowskie	2,736	Lucjan Tajchman "Wirt", Antoni Biedroń "Baca", Roman Żołędź "Marian"
Warsaw-miasto	2,330	Władysław Wilczyński "Gnat"
Warsaw podmiejska	832	Lucjan Tobolski "Luc", Ludiwk Wiliński "Lucek"
Rzeszów	1,103	Wincenty Rubacha Świder", Tytus Zwoliński "Raf"
Tarnów	912	Kazimierz Czubak "Kazet", Józef Hanzel "Krata"
Białystok	830	Władysław Zieliński "Michał"
Kielce	630	Michał Gorajski "Marmur", Franciszek Słupiński "Niwa"
Wilno	630	Jakub Łuksza "Kuba", Franciszek Stążowski "Franek"
Lublin	480	Stanisław Karwowski "Ster"
Krosno-Podkarpacie	460	Stefan Brodziński "Grot"
Lwów	340	Miachał Filipiak "Fil", Franciszek Petri "Franek"
Cieszyn	220	Emanuel Wieczorek "Marek"
Tarnopol	112	Ludwik Mędrek "Maszyna"

== See also ==
- Blue Police
- Jewish Ghetto Police
- Lithuanian Security Police
- National Security Corps (Państwowy Korpus Bezpieczeństwa)
- Polnisches Schutzmannschaftsbataillon 202
