= Aleksandra Stypułkowska =

Polish lawyer (1906–1982)

Aleksandra Stypułkowska (7 October 1906 in Warsaw – 20 March 1982 in London) was a Polish lawyer, member of the Polish resistance, concentration camp inmate, activist and political journalist with Radio Free Europe, where she broadcast under the pseudonym, Jadwiga Mieczkowska.

== Life ==
She was the daughter of Władysław Rabski and Zuzanna, née Kraushar. She attended the independent Cecylia Plater-Zyberk Secondary Academy for Girls in Warsaw. She gained her School-leaving certificate in 1924 and went on to read law at University of Warsaw graduating in 1928. In 1927 she married Zbigniew Stypułkowski. On completing her Pupillage in 1934, she opened a legal practice with her husband. With the outbreak of the Second World War, she became involved in the Polish underground resistance. In March 1940 she was detained for two months in Pawiak prison. In November 1943 she was again arrested and in March 1944, sent to Ravensbrück concentration camp. She was liberated in April 1945 and, with several thousand other women inmates, evacuated for convalescence to Sweden, where she remained until 1947.

That same year she left for Great Britain, where she worked in the editorial office of the Dziennik Polski. She became president of the Polish Association of former German Political Prisoners and Inmates of Concentration Camps. In 1952 she moved to West Germany to work with the CIA-funded Polish Section of Radio Free Europe. In 1959 she became an editor and a commentator on the flagship programme, "Facts, events and opinions". Her voice became one of the most recognisable at the station. In 1974 she retired and returned to London, while continuing to provide political commentary for RFE.

In 1980, she was a co-founder in Britain of the Information Centre for Polish Affairs with the aims of monitoring Human rights abuses and fostering democratic institutions in Poland. She was its first president. In September 2010, she was posthumously awarded the Commander's Cross with Star Order of Polonia Restituta "for outstanding services in support of democratic transformation in Poland, for humanitarian aid to Poles during martial law and for her social activism".

From her marriage she had a son, Andrzej Stypułkowski, born 1929 who also became an émigré political activist.
