= Sierzchowy =

- Village
- Location within Poland
- Coordinates: 51°40′7″N 20°19′3″E
- Country: Poland
- Voivodeship: Łódź
- County: Rawa
- Gmina: Cielądz
- Website: http://www.sierzchowy.w8w.pl

Sierzchowy [ɕɛʂˈxɔvɨ] is a village in the administrative district of Gmina Cielądz, within Rawa County, Łódź Voivodeship, in central Poland.

== Notable people ==
- Tomasz Arciszewski (1877-1955) - Polish socialist politician, a member of the Polish Socialist Party and the Prime Minister of the Polish government-in-exile was born in Sierzchowy.
