= Zygmunt Zaremba =

Polish socialist activist and publicist

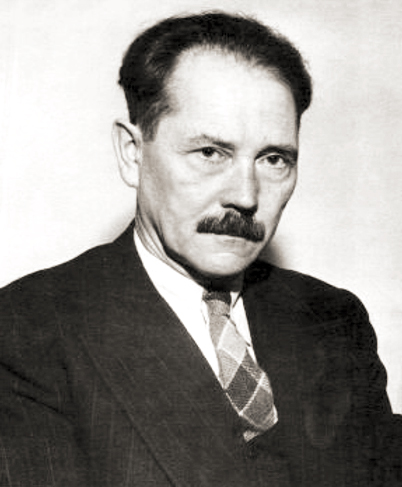
- Zaremba circa 1955
- Born: Zygmunt Witalis Zaremba; April 28, 1895; Piotrków Trybunalski, Congress Poland
- Died: October 5, 1967 (aged 72); Sceaux, France
- Other names: Andrzej Czarski (or Czerski); Wit Smrek

Zygmunt Witalis Zaremba (born 1895, Piotrków, Poland – died 5 October 1967, Sceaux, France), pseudonyms Andrzej Czarski (Czerski), Wit Smrek, was a Polish socialist activist and publicist.

== Biography ==
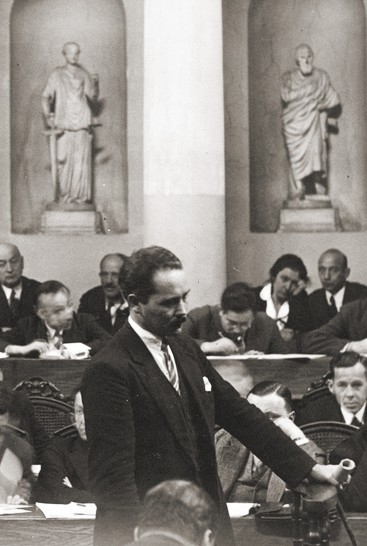
Zygmunt Zaremba as a witness during court proceedings (Brest trials) 1931

Zaremba was a member of the Youth Association for Progress and Independence (Związek Młodzieży Postępowo-Niepodległościowej; 1911), Polish Socialist Party - Opposition (Polska Partia Socjalistyczna - Opozycja; 1912–1914), then was a member of the Polish Socialist Party (Polska Partia Socjalistyczna) and its Central Executive Committee (Centralny Komitet Wykonawczy; 1917–1918).

From 1918 onward, he stayed in Poland. Then, he became a member of Polish Socialist Party authorities – Supreme Council (Rada Naczelna; 1919–1939) and Central Executive Committee (1921–1924, 1926–1939). During the years of 1921–1924 he was a vice-president of its Supreme Council.

From 1922–35, he was a deputy in the Sejm. During the invasion of Poland in 1939, he organised the Robotnicza Brygada Obrony Warszawy. Zaremba was a co-founder of conspiratory Polish Socialist Party - Freedom-Equality-Independence (PPS - Wolność-Równość-Niepodległość).

From 1944–45, he was a representative of the Council of National Unity (Rada Jedności Narodowej). In 1946, he moved to Paris, where he became a president of the Central Committee (Rada Centralna) of the Polish Socialist Party. In 1949, he co-founded Political Council (Rada Polityczna) in London. He was a president and co-founder of the International Socialist Office and then, until 1964, president of the Central-East Socialist Europe Union.

Zaremba was a co-author of Program Polski Ludowej (1941). He edited Robotnik, Pobudka, and Związkowiec, as well as the journals Światło (1947–1959) and Droga (1959–1960).

== Notable works ==
- Czerski, Andrzej (1930). Od Borysowa do Rygi.
- — (1932). Racjonalizacja - kryzys - proletariat.
- — (1933). PPS w Polsce niepodległej (1918-1932).
- — (1939). Obrona Warszawy.
- — (1940). Obrona Warszawy. London.
- — (1944). Powstanie sierpniowe.
- — (1952). Les transformations sociales en Pologne. Paris.
- — (1957). Wojna i konspiracja. London.
- — (1965). Przemiany w ruchu komunistycznym. Paris.
- — (1968). Wspomnienia. Pokolenie przełomu 1905-1919.
