= Home Political Representation =

Home Political Representation (Polish: Krajowa Reprezentacja Polityczna, KRP) was the representation of the four major Polish political parties continuing their activities underground (PPS-WRN, SL, SN and Labor Party). It was the political arm of the Polish Secret State in occupied Poland during World War II. It was formed from the existing Political Consultative Committee (Polityczny Komitet Porozumiewawczy) based on the agreement before the four parties signed on 15 August 1943.

Failing to reach agreement with the pro-Soviet Polish Workers' Party (Polska Partia Robotnicza) and faced with the communist creation of the pseudo-parliament of State National Council (Krajowa Rada Narodowa) on 31 December 1943, on 9 January 1944 it would become the basis of the counter-parliament - the Council of National Unity (Rada Jedności Narodowej).
