= Trial of the Sixteen =

Staged trial of 16 leaders of the Polish Secret State held by the Soviet Union

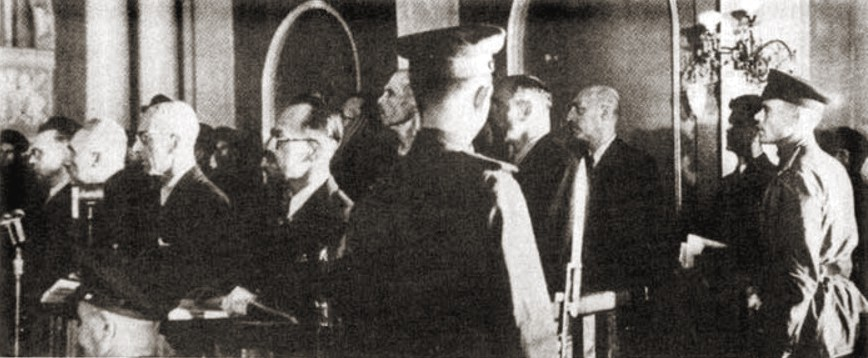
The show trial of 16 leaders of the Polish wartime underground movement (including the Home Army and civil authorities) convicted of "drawing up plans for military action against the U.S.S.R.", Moscow, June 1945. All of them had been invited to help organize the new "Polish Government of National Unity" in March 1945 and were subsequently captured by the NKVD.

The Trial of the Sixteen (Polish: Proces szesnastu) was a staged trial of 16 leaders of the Polish Underground State held by the Soviet authorities in Moscow in 1945. All captives were kidnapped by the NKVD secret service and falsely accused of various forms of 'illegal activity' against the Red Army.

== History ==
The Government Delegate, together with most members of the Council of National Unity and the Commander-in-chief of the Armia Krajowa, were invited by Soviet general Ivan Serov (with agreement of Joseph Stalin) to a conference on their eventual entry to the Soviet-backed Provisional Government. Some historical accounts say approaches were made in February, with others saying March 1945. The Polish politicians were presented with a warrant of safety, but were instead arrested in Pruszków and brutally beaten by the NKVD on 27 and 28 March. Leopold Okulicki, Jan Stanisław Jankowski and Kazimierz Pużak were arrested on the 27th with 12 others the following day. Alexander Zwierzyński had been arrested earlier. They were brought to Moscow for interrogation in the Lubyanka.

After several months of brutal interrogation and torture they were presented with trumped-up accusations of:

1. Collaboration with Nazi Germany
2. Carrying-out intelligence gathering and sabotage at the rear of the Red Army
3. State terrorism
4. Planning a military alliance with Nazi Germany
5. Owning a radio transmitter, printing machines, and weapons
6. Propaganda against the Soviet Union
7. Membership in underground organizations.

The trial took place between 18 and 21 June 1945 with foreign press and observers from the United Kingdom and United States present. The date was chosen carefully to be at the same time as a conference on the creation of the Soviet-backed Polish puppet government was organized. The verdict was issued on 21 June, with most of the defendants coerced into pleading guilty by the NKVD. General Okulicki's witnesses for the defense were declared unreachable "owing to bad atmospheric conditions", and no evidence was offered during the trial. Of the sixteen defendants, twelve were sentenced to prison terms ranging from four months to ten years, while charges against the four others were dropped by the prosecution.

Immediately after the arrest of all the leaders, the Polish government in exile sent a protest note to Washington and London demanding their release. At first the Soviets declared that the whole case was a bluff by the "Fascist Polish government". When they finally admitted that the leaders had been arrested (on 5 May), the American envoy of Harry S. Truman, Harry Lloyd Hopkins, was told by Joseph Stalin that "there is no point in linking the case of the Trial of the Sixteen with the support for the Soviet-backed government of Poland because the sentences will not be high." Both British and American governments shared this view.

== People involved ==
1. Lt. General Vasili Ulrikh, notable for playing a major role in the Great Purge trials, served as the main judge and issued the following sentences:
2. Commander in Chief of the Armia Krajowa, Leopold Okulicki (Niedźwiadek) – 10 years in prison, may have been murdered on Christmas Eve of 1946 but may have died due to complications caused by hunger strike.
3. Deputy Prime Minister of Poland and the Government Delegate, Jan Stanisław Jankowski – 8 years in prison, never released, died in a Soviet prison on 13 March 1953, two weeks before the end of his sentence; probably murdered.
4. Minister of Internal Affairs, Adam Bień – 5 years
5. Deputy Minister of Internal Affairs, Stanislaw Jasiukowicz – 5 years
6. Head of the Council of National Unity and PPS-WRN socialist party – Kazimierz Pużak – 1.5 years, released in November 1945 and returned to Poland. Refused to emigrate, Pużak was again arrested by the Urząd Bezpieczeństwa in 1947 and sentenced to 10 years in prison; died 30 April 1950
7. Deputy head of the Council of National Unity and head of the Labor Party, Aleksander Zwierzyński – 8 months
8. Member of the Council of National Unity, Kazimierz Bagiński – 1 year, later released and forced to emigrate to the United States
9. Member of the Council of National Unity, Head of Zjednoczenie Demokratyczne, Eugeniusz Czarnowski – 6 months
10. Member of the Council of National Unity, Head of the Labor Party, Józef Chaciński – 4 months
11. Member of the Council of National Unity, Stanisław Mierzwa – 4 months
12. Member of the Council of National Unity, Zbigniew Stypułkowski – 4 months, later released and forced to emigrate to the United Kingdom
13. Member of the Council of National Unity, Franciszek Urbański – 4 months
14. Member of the Council of National Unity, Stanisław Michałowski – acquitted of all the charges
15. Member of the Council of National Unity, Kazimierz Kobylański – acquitted of all the charges
16. Member of the Council of National Unity, interpreter for the group, Józef Stemler – acquitted of all the charges
17. Deputy Government Delegate – Antoni Pajdak was sentenced to 5 years in prison in a secret trial in November; he was not released until 1955.

== Aftermath ==
In his book, Europe at War, Norman Davies described it as "obscene", that there was no official protest abroad. As a result of the trial, the Polish Secret State was deprived of most of its leaders. Its structures were soon rebuilt, but were never able to fully recover. On 5 July 1945, the United Kingdom and the United States withdrew their recognition of the Polish government in exile. Soviet and Polish Communist repressions aimed at former members of the Polish Secret State and the Armia Krajowa lasted into the 1960s.

== See also ==
- Anti-Polonism
- Western betrayal
