= Jan Stanisław Jankowski =

Polish politician (1882–1953)

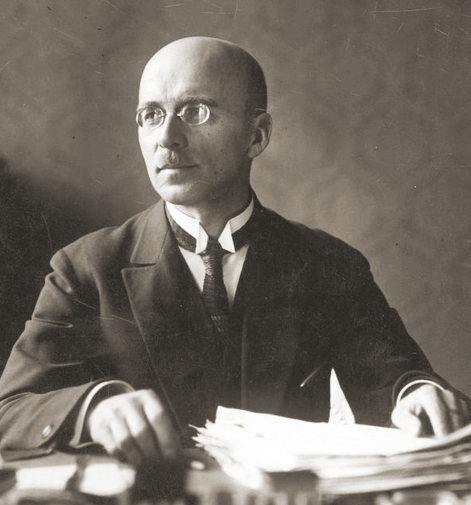
Jan Stanisław Jankowski (1926)

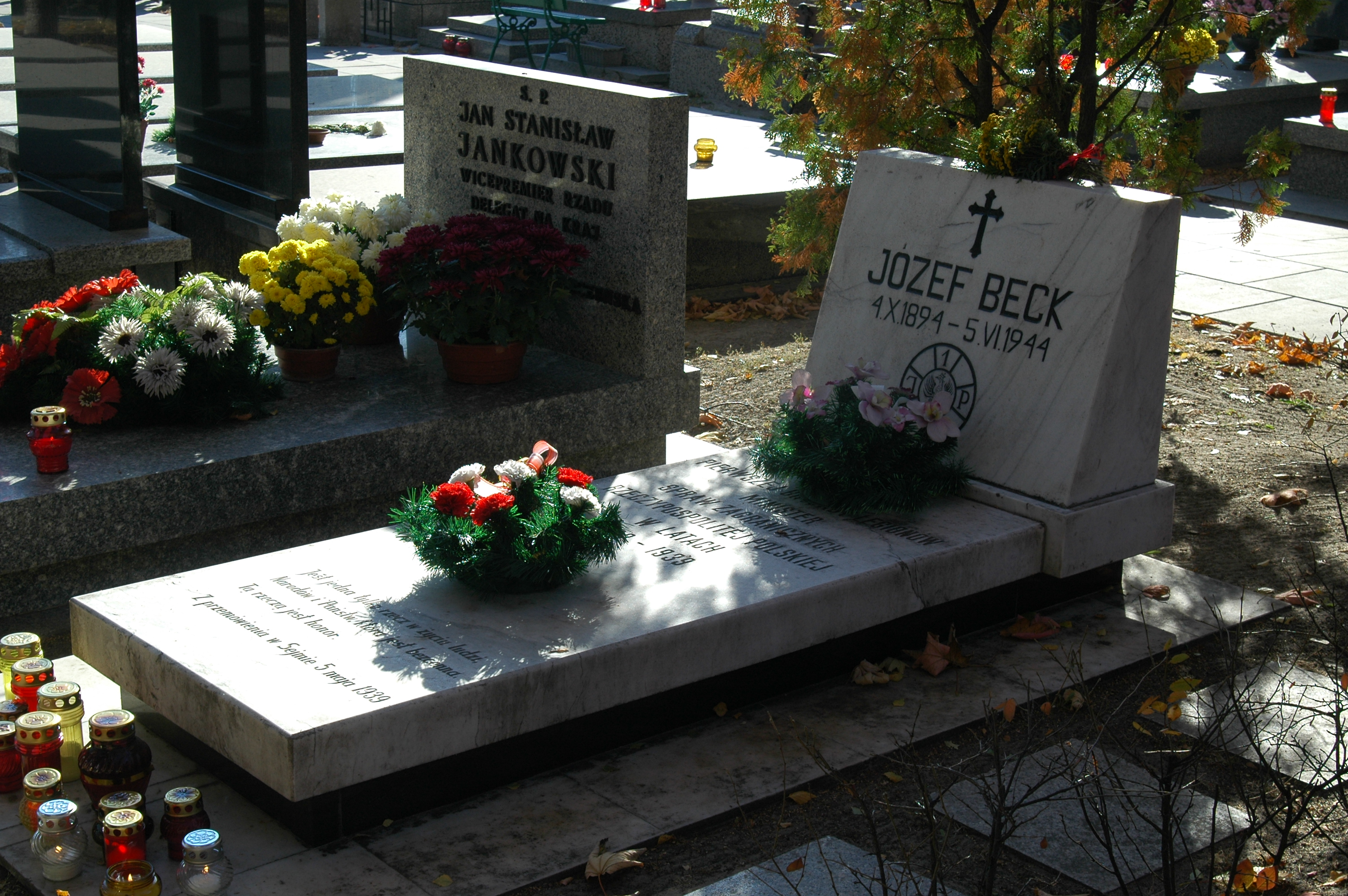
Symbolic grave of Jankowski (far), next to the tomb of Józef Beck at Warsaw's Powązki Military Cemetery

Jan Stanisław Jankowski (6 May 1882 – 13 March 1953; noms de guerre Doktor, Jan, Klonowski, Sobolewski, Soból) was a Polish politician, an important figure in the Polish civil resistance during World War II and a Government Delegate at Home. Arrested by the NKVD, he was sentenced in the Trial of the Sixteen and murdered in a Soviet prison.

== Life and career ==
Jankowski was born in the village of Krasowo Wielkie in Łomża Governorate (now in Wysokie Mazowieckie County), some 60 kilometres from Warsaw. Born to a family of local szlachta, he received an education in Austro-Hungarian Galicia. Early in his youth he became involved in politics. As a Socialist, in 1906 he was among the co-founders of the National Workers' Union. In 1912 he entered the KTSSN, a Galicia-based confederation of all the political factions supporting Austria-Hungary as the only state to be able to reunite and liberate Poland after roughly a century of partitions. In 1915, at the outbreak of the Great War, he joined the Polish Legions.

After Poland regained her independence in 1918, he remained an active politician. In 1920 he co-founded the National Workers' Party (NPR), which he headed until 1923 and of which he remained a deputy chairman until 1933. As the most prominent politician of the NPR, between 1921 and the May coup d'état of 1926 he was the minister of labour and social policies in the government of Poland. In 1928 he was elected a member of the Sejm, a seat he held until 1935. In 1937 he moved to the Labor Party and became one of its leaders.

After the Polish Defensive War of 1939 he remained in Poland and helped in the reconstruction of his party in new, underground conditions. After the foundations for the Polish Secret State had been laid, in 1941 Jankowski became the Director of Labour and Social Care (a de facto minister) of the Government Delegate's Office at Home. After Jan Piekałkiewicz was arrested by the Gestapo in February 1943, Jankowski replaced him as the Government Delegate at Home, under the formal rank of the deputy Prime Minister of Poland. On 31 July 1944 he approved the decision to start the Warsaw Uprising. During the fighting in Warsaw, he remained close to the headquarters of the Armia Krajowa, but lost any contact with most of the cells of the Government Delegate's Office in other parts of Poland. After the capitulation of Warsaw to the Germans, he left the city along with civilians and managed to hide in the countryside, from where he continued his duties.

In March 1945 he was arrested by the NKVD and taken to Moscow, where he was put on trial together with 15 other representatives of the Polish authorities. After three months of brutal interrogation and torture he was presented with the forged accusations of collaboration with Nazi Germany, sabotage, terrorism, planning a military alliance with Nazi Germany, owning a radio transmitter and several other trumped-up charges. He was sentenced to eight years in a Soviet prison and died there, likely murdered, on March 13, 1953, two weeks before the end of his sentence. His body was probably buried in the prison in Vladimir on Klyazma, though the whereabouts of his death, as well as the place of his burial remain classified.

In addition to the Virtuti Militari (5th class) he received for his service in the Warsaw Uprising, in 1995 Jankowski was posthumously awarded the Order of the White Eagle.

== Note ==
- udskior.gov.pl
