= Political Consultative Committee =

Polish Secret State political arm

Political Consultative Committee (Polish: Polityczny Komitet Porozumiewawczy, PKP) was the beginning of the political arm of the Polish Secret State in occupied Poland during World War II. It was formed on 26 February 1940 by several Polish political parties continuing their activities underground (Socialist Party, People's Party, National Party and Labor Party). The parties wanted to tighten the cooperation so that they could have more influence over the newly created Association of Armed Struggle (ZWZ) meant by the Polish government in exile as the main unified organization of the Polish resistance. In April 1940 the government in exile recognized the Committee as the country's political representation.

In 1943 it was reformed into the Home Political Representation (Krajowa Reprezentacja Polityczna) which in turn in 1944 would become the basis of the Council of National Unity (Rada Jedności Narodowej).
