= Council of National Unity =

Rada Jedności Narodowej (Council of National Unity, RJN) was the quasi-parliament of the Polish Underground State during World War II. It was created by the Government Delegate on 9 January 1944.

== History ==
Originally the political arm of the Polish Secret State was Political Consultative Committee (Polityczny Komitet Porozumiewawczy, PKP), a council composed of 4 main political parties. On 21 March 1943 it was renamed to Home Political Representation (Krajowa Reprezentacja Polityczna, KRP) and became an underground coalition parliament, composed of members of Polish Socialist Party, National Party, People's Party and Labor Party. It became the controlling body of both the Delegate's Office and the Headquarters of the Armia Krajowa.

On 9 January 1944 it was turned into Council of National Unity, the underground parliament of Poland. Initially only the rump council was chosen, composed mostly of members of the former KRP. On 12 March of the same year the Council was extended to include more members.

RJN was opposed to the communist-controlled quasi-parliament, State National Council.

On 15 March 1944, the RJN declared its manifesto named O co walczy naród polski (What does the Polish nation fight for). According to the document, the main aims of Poland in the Second World War were:

- restoration of free, independent, strong and safe Poland
- reaching an international peace
- cooperation of all nations
- defeating Germany, its dismemberment and disarmament
- forcing Germany to rebuild the countries it destroyed
- organisation of a trial of war criminals
- alliance with France, Turkey, the United Kingdom and the United States
- restoration of diplomatic relations with the Soviet Union

Regarding the post-war Poland, the RJN declared that its borders were to be based on the borders as of 1938, with East Prussia, Opole Silesia and part of Pomerania incorporated as war reparations. The Polish political system was to be based on parliamentary democracy, with strong self-government. The RJN also declared the will to develop the Polish industry and base the economy on socialist principles of planned economy and land reform.

During the Warsaw Uprising the RJN issued several appeals and open letters to the western powers asking to help Warsaw and the Polish struggle for independence. On 22 February 1945, protested against the outcome of the Yalta Conference and the fact that no representatives of Poland were informed of the meeting. At the same time the RJN proposed to accept communist into the provisional government.

After the Red Army conquered Poland, the members of the RJN remained underground. In March 1945 large part of them were arrested by the NKVD and brought to Moscow. After 3 months of interrogations, the members of the Polish government were sentenced in the Trial of the Sixteen.

Until May 1945 the RJN was reconstructed from the remaining members. However, the Soviet occupation of Poland and the end of World War II made the further existence of RJN pointless. On 1 July 1945, the RJN issued the Do Narodu Polskiego i Narodów Zjednoczonych (To the Polish Nation and the United Nations) manifesto and the so-called Testament of the Fighting Poland, in which it underlined the basic Polish aims of the war and the principles of Polish-Soviet relations. The latter document also demanded that the Red Army be withdrawn from Poland, the communists stopped reprisals and terror against the soldiers of the Polish Secret State and the civilians, democracy be introduced and the social reforms be started.

After issuing the documents, the RJN was dissolved.

== Composition ==
Since Poland was still under enemy occupation and no elections could be held, it was decided that the RJN would include representatives of all major political parties of Poland. Initially it included representatives of Socialist Party, People's Party, Labor Party and National Party and the Catholic clergy (three representatives each). In July 1944 the RJN was extended to include also representatives of Chłopska Organizacja Wolności, Ojczyzna, ZD and representatives of co-operative movement.

The RJN was headed by the Main Commission. Its head was Kazimierz Pużak (nom de guerre Bazyli). After he was arrested and sentenced in a staged Trial of the Sixteen, the Main Commission was headed by various politicians, chosen from among the remainder of the council for a 1-month term.

== See also ==
- History of Poland (1939–45)
