= Polish Underground State =

Polish government in exile during World War II in German-occupied Poland

Polish Underground State Polskie Państwo Podziemne
- 1939–1945
- Flag Emblem
- Motto: "Honor i Ojczyzna" ("Honor and Fatherland")
- Anthem: "Mazurek Dąbrowskiego" (English: "Poland Is Not Yet Lost")
- Status: Government in exile
- Common languages: Polish
- President of the Polish government-in-exile
  - 1939–1945: Władysław Raczkiewicz
- Prime Minister of the Polish government-in-exile
  - 1939–1940 (first): Władysław Sikorski
  - 1944–1945 (last): Tomasz Arciszewski
- Legislature: Political Consultative Committee (1940–1943) Home Political Representation (1943–1944) Council of National Unity (1944–1945)
- Historical era: World War II
  - Constitution adopted: 23 April 1935
  - Invasion of Poland: 1 September 1939
  - Provisional Government of National Unity established: 28 June 1945
Preceded by	Succeeded by
Second Polish Republic	Provisional Government of National Unity

The Polish Underground State (Polish: Polskie Państwo Podziemne, also known as the Polish Secret State) (Note: The more widely used term Polish Underground State was first used on 13 January 1944 by the official underground publication of the Polish underground authorities, the Biuletyn Informacyjny. Polish Secret State (Polish: Tajne państwo) was a term used by Jan Karski in his book Story of a Secret State, written and first published in the second half of 1944 in the United States.) was a single political and military entity formed by the union of resistance organisations in occupied Poland that were loyal to the Government of the Republic of Poland in exile in London. The first elements of the Underground State were established in the final days of the German and Soviet invasion of Poland, in late September 1939. The Underground State was perceived by supporters as a legal continuation of the pre-war Republic of Poland (and its institutions) that waged an armed struggle against the country's occupying powers: Nazi Germany and the Soviet Union. The Underground State encompassed not only military resistance, one of the largest in the world, (Note: Several sources note that the Armia Krajowa was the largest resistance movement in Nazi-occupied Europe. For example, Norman Davies wrote "Armia Krajowa (Home Army), the AK, which could fairly claim to be the largest of European resistance"; Gregor Dallas wrote "Home Army (Armia Krajowa or AK) in late 1943 numbered around 400,000, making it the largest resistance organisation in Europe"; Mark Wyman wrote "Armia Krajowa was considered the largest underground resistance unit in wartime Europe". Certainly, the Polish resistance was the largest resistance movement until the German invasion of Yugoslavia and the Soviet Union in 1941; in the last years of the war those two resistances would rival AK in its strength (see Resistance during World War II for a more detailed analysis). Compared to them, the size of the French resistance was smaller, numbering around 10,000 people in 1942, and swelling to 200,000 by 1944.) but also civilian structures, such as justice, education, culture and social services.

Although the Underground State enjoyed broad support throughout much of the war, it was not supported or recognized by the communists and some of the right-wing extremists. The influence of the communists eventually declined amid military reversals (most notably, the failure of the Warsaw Uprising) and the growing hostility of the USSR. The Soviet Union had created an alternative, puppet government in 1944 (the Polish Committee of National Liberation) and ensured it formed the basis of the post-war government in Poland. During the Soviet-backed communist takeover of Poland at the end of the war, many Underground State members were prosecuted as alleged traitors and died in captivity. Abandoned by the Western Allies, finding it impossible to negotiate with the Soviets, and wishing to avoid a civil war, the key institutions of the Underground State dissolved themselves in the first half of 1945.

Ultimately, hundreds of thousands of people were directly involved with various agencies of the Underground State (the estimates for membership in Armia Krajowa alone are often given at approaching half a million people), and they were quietly supported by millions of Polish citizens. The rationale behind the creation of the secret civilian authority drew on the fact that the German and Soviet occupation of Poland was illegal. Hence, all institutions created by the occupying powers were considered illegal, and parallel Polish underground institutions were set up in accordance with Polish law. The scale of the Underground State was also inadvertently aided by the actions of the occupiers, whose attempts to destroy the Polish state, nation, and its culture, including most importantly genocidal policies that targeted Polish citizens, fuelled popular support for the Polish resistance movement and its development.

During the Cold War era, research on the Underground State was curtailed by Polish communist officials, who instead emphasised the role that communist partisans played in the anti-Nazi resistance. Hence, until recently, the bulk of research done on this topic was carried out by Polish scholars living in exile.

== History ==
=== 1939–1940: Formation ===
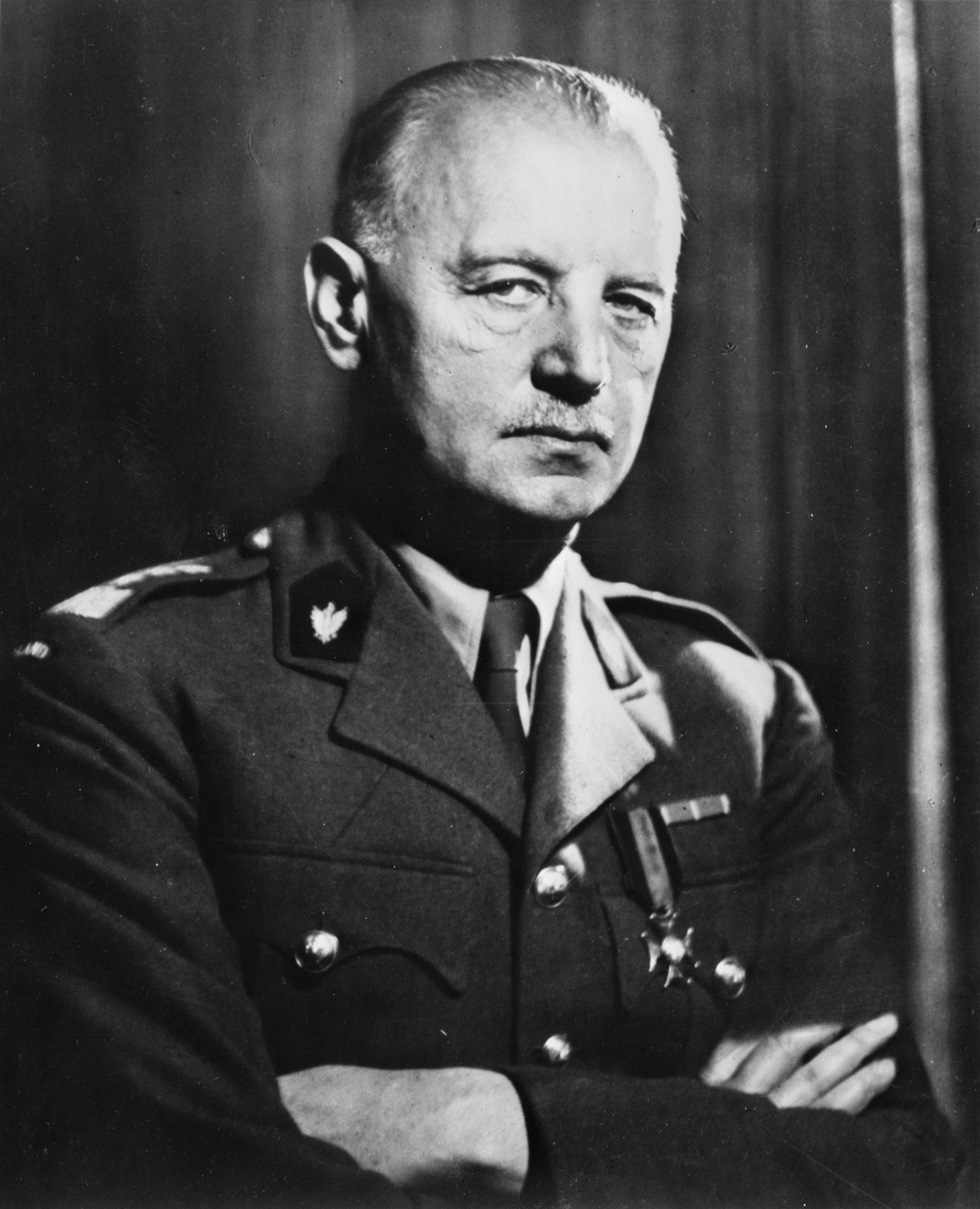
Władysław Sikorski, Polish commander in chief and prime minister during World War II

In many respects, the history of the Polish Underground State mirrors that of the Polish non-communist resistance in general. The Underground State traces its origins to the Service for Poland's Victory (Służba Zwycięstwu Polski, SZP) organization, which was founded on 27 September 1939, one day before the surrender of the Polish capital of Warsaw, at a time when the Polish defeat in the German invasion of Poland (accompanied by the Soviet one) appeared inevitable. SZP founder General Michał Karaszewicz-Tokarzewski received orders from Polish Commander-in-Chief Marshal Edward Rydz-Śmigły to organize and carry out the struggle in occupied Poland. Karaszewicz-Tokarzewski decided that the organisation he was creating needed to move beyond a strictly military format; and in line with the traditions of the underground 19th-century Polish National Government and World War I-era Polish Military Organisation, it would need to encompass various aspects of civilian life. Hence, the SZP, in contact with (and subordinate to) the Polish Government in Exile, envisioned itself not only as an armed resistance organization, but also as a vehicle through which the Polish state continued to administer its occupied territories.

Following the Polish Constitution, President Ignacy Mościcki, interned in Romania after the Polish government evacuated itself from Poland on 17 September, resigned and appointed General Bolesław Wieniawa-Długoszowski as his successor; unpopular with the French government, Wieniawa-Długoszowski was replaced by Władysław Raczkiewicz on 29 September. General Władysław Sikorski, a long-term opponent of the Sanacja regime who resided in France and had the support of the French government, would become the Polish Commander-in-Chief (on 28 September) and Poland's Prime Minister (on 30 September). This government was quickly recognized by France and the United Kingdom. Raczkiewicz, described as "weak and indecisive", held relatively little influence compared to charismatic Sikorski.

Due to political differences among factions in the Polish exile government, and in particular, SZP ties to the Sanacja regime, which dominated the Polish government since the mid-1920s, the SZP was reorganised into the Union of Armed Struggle (Związek Walki Zbrojnej, ZWZ) on 13 November 1939. Karaszewicz-Tokarzewski supported that move, aiming to include parties marginalized by the Sanacja regime, and supported the formation of the Main Political Council (Główna Rada Polityczna, GRP). Sikorski named General Kazimierz Sosnkowski the head of the ZWZ and Colonel Stefan Rowecki was appointed the commander of the ZWZ German occupation zone. Karaszewicz-Tokarzewski became the commander of the ZWZ Soviet zone but was arrested in March 1940 by the Soviets when attempting to cross the new German-Soviet border. In June Sikorski appointed Rowecki as the commander of both zones.

Given that the ZWZ focused on military aspects of the struggle, its civilian dimension was less clearly defined and developed more slowly — a situation exacerbated by the complex political discussions that were then unfolding between politicians in occupied Poland and the government in exile (first located in Paris, and after the fall of France, in London). Sikorski's government opted for a much more democratic procedure than the less democratic prewar Sanacja regime. The National Council (Rada Narodowa) was formed by the government in exile in December 1939, including representatives from different Polish political factions. Meanwhile, in occupied Poland, a major step toward the development of the organisation's civilian structure was taken in late February 1940, when the ZWZ established its local version of the National Council, the Political Consultative Committee (Polityczny Komitet Porozumiewawczy, PKP). PKP was formed in 1940 pursuant to an agreement between several major political parties: the Socialist Party, People's Party, National Party and Labor Party. In 1943 it was renamed to Home Political Representation (Krajowa Reprezentacja Polityczna) and in 1944 to Council of National Unity (Rada Jedności Narodowej).

The structures in occupied Poland maintained close communication with the government in exile, through radio communications and "hundreds, if not thousands" of couriers, such as Jan Karski. One of the most significant developments of 1940 was the creation of the office of Government Delegation for Poland (Delegatura Rządu na Kraj), with Cyryl Ratajski (nominated on 3 December) as the first Delegate; this event marked the official beginning of the Underground State (Ratajski would be followed by Jan Piekałkiewicz, Jan Stanisław Jankowski and Stefan Korboński). The post of the Delegate could be seen as equivalent to that of a Deputy Prime Minister (particularly since the legislation of 1944). Unlike the GRP and PKP, which operated alongside the military structures but had no influence over them, the Delegation had budgetary control over the military. The Delegation was to oversee the military and recreate the civilian administration.

As early as 1940, the Underground State's civilian arm was actively supporting underground education; it then set out to develop social security, information (propaganda) and justice networks.

=== 1941–1943: Growth ===
By 1942, most of the differences between politicians in occupied Poland and those in exile had been positively settled. By 1943, the PKP had evolved into the Home Political Representation (Krajowa Reprezentacja Polityczna, KRP), which served as the basis of the Council of National Unity (Rada Jedności Narodowej, RJN), created on 9 January 1944. The council, headed by Kazimierz Pużak, was seen as the Underground State's parliament. Meanwhile, the military arm of the Underground State expanded dramatically, and the ZWZ was transformed into Armia Krajowa (AK, or the Home Army) in 1942. ZWZ-AK commanders included Stefan Rowecki, Tadeusz Komorowski and Leopold Okulicki.

In August 1943 and March 1944, the Polish Underground State announced its long-term plan, which was partly designed to undercut the attractiveness of some of the communists' proposals. The communists, in their increasingly radical What We Fight For declarations (from March and November 1943), were proposing the creation of a heavily socialist or even communist state, denouncing capitalism, which they equated to slavery. They demanded nationalization of most if not all of the economy, introduction of central planning, The Underground State's declaration What the Polish Nation is Fighting For declared the reconstruction of Poland as a democratic parliamentary state as its goal, guaranteeing full equality to the minorities, as well as full freedom of speech, freedom of religion, and freedom of political activity. The plan also called for the creation of a Central European federal union, without domination by any single state. In the economic sector, planned economy would be endorsed, by embracing the socialist and Christian Democrat principles, such as income redistribution, aiming at a reduction of economic inequality. The plan promised land reform, nationalization of the industrial base, demands for territorial compensation from Germany, and re-establishment of the country's pre-1939 eastern border. According to the plan, the country's Eastern borders, as delineated by the 1921 Treaty of Riga, would be kept while in the north and west compensation would be sought from German territories. Thus, the main differences between the Underground State and the communists, in terms of politics, were not rooted in radical economic and social reforms, which both sides advocated, but rather in their divergent positions on such issues as national sovereignty, borders, and Polish-Soviet relations. The program was criticized by the nationalist factions, for being too socialist, and not "Christian" enough.

The Underground State achieved its zenith of influence in early 1944. In April, the Polish government in exile recognized the administrative structure of the Delegate's Office as the Temporary Governmental Administration. This was when the Delegate officially became recognized as the Deputy Prime Minister, and the Council of Ministers at Home (Krajowa Rada Ministrów, KRM) was created. The Underground State, however, declined sharply in the aftermath of the nationwide uprising, Operation Tempest, initiated in the spring of 1944. In addition to the costly and eventually unsuccessful Warsaw Uprising part of the Operation Tempest, the hostile attitude of the Soviet Union and its puppet Polish government, the Polish Committee of National Liberation (Polski Komitet Wyzwolenia Narodowego, PKWN), towards the non-communist resistance loyal to the Polish government in exile proved to be disastrous. The Underground State assumed that the Polish resistance would aid the advancing Soviet forces, and AK commanders and representatives of the administrative authority would assume the role of legitimate hosts. Instead, the Soviets commonly surrounded, disarmed and arrested the Underground's military authority members and its civilian representatives, instituting their own administrative structures instead. In early July 1944, even as the AK resistance continued its struggle against the Germans, the Underground State was forced to order the AK and its administrative structure to remain in hiding from the Soviets, due to continued arrests and reprisals experienced by those who revealed themselves.

=== 1944–1945: Decline and dissolution ===
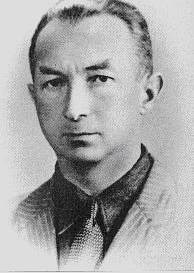
Stefan Korboński, the last delegate

Events taking place in 1943 significantly weakened the Polish government in exile. A rift developed between Poland and the Soviet Union, an increasingly important ally for the West, particularly after the revelation of the Katyn massacre in 1943 (on 13 April), followed by the breaking off of diplomatic relations with Poland by the Soviets (on 21 April). The subsequent death (on 4 July) of the charismatic General Sikorski, succeeded by less influential Stanisław Mikołajczyk as the Prime Minister, and General Sosnkowski as the Commander-in-Chief, contributed to the decline. No representative of the Polish government was invited to the Tehran Conference (28 November – 1 December 1943) or the Yalta Conference (4–11 February 1945), the two crucial events in which the Western Allies and the Soviet Union discussed the shape of the post-war world and decided on the fate of Poland, assigning it to the Soviet sphere of influence. In Tehran, neither Churchill nor Roosevelt objected to Stalin's suggestion that the Polish government in exile in London was not representing Polish interests; as historian Anita Prażmowska noted, "this spelled the end of that government's tenuous influence and raison d'être." After the Tehran Conference, Stalin decided to create his own puppet government for Poland, and the PKWN was proclaimed in 1944. PKWN was recognized by the Soviet Government as the only legitimate authority in Poland, while Mikołajczyk's Government in London was termed by the Soviets an "illegal and self-styled authority." Mikołajczyk would serve in the Prime Minister's role until 24 November 1944, when, realising the increasing powerlessness of the government in exile, he resigned and was succeeded by Tomasz Arciszewski, "whose obscurity", in the words of historian Mieczysław B. Biskupski, "signaled the arrival of the government in exile at total inconsequentiality."

The communists refused to deal with the Underground State just like they refused to deal with the government in exile; its leaders and soldiers in "liberated" Polish territories were persecuted. A number of prominent leaders of the Underground State, including the Government Delegate, Jan Stanisław Jankowski and the last AK Commander-in-Chief, General Leopold Okulicki, who decided to reveal themselves and upon the Soviet invitation begun open negotiations with the communist authorities, were arrested and sentenced by the Soviets in Moscow in the infamous Trial of the Sixteen (arrests were carried out in March 1945, and the trial itself took place in June that year). On 27 June 1945 the Council of National Unity held its last session, issuing a 12-point declaration demanding that the Soviet army leave Poland and the repression of the non-communist political parties cease. The Government Delegate's Office at Home, restructured after the arrests of its leadership and headed by the last Delegate, Stefan Korboński, disbanded on 1 July, after the creation in Moscow of the Provisional Government of National Unity (Tymczasowy Rząd Jedności Narodowej, TRJN) on 28 June 1945. The disbanding of those structures marked the end of the Underground State.

The TRJN was composed primarily of communist representatives from the PKWN, with a token representation of the opposition as a gesture towards the Western Allies. With the establishment of the TRJN, the government in exile stopped being recognised by the Western Allies (France withdrew its recognition on 29 June, followed by United Kingdom and the United States on 5 July), who decided to support the Soviet-backed and increasingly communist TRJN body. Seeing this as a "Western betrayal", the government in exile protested that decision and continued to operate till the fall of communism in 1989, when it recognised the post-communist Polish government. Following the rigged Polish legislative election of 1947, the few independent politicians like Mikołajczyk who attempted to form an opposition were threatened with arrests, retired or emigrated.

The Underground State's military arm, Armia Krajowa, officially disbanded on 19 January 1945 to avoid armed conflict with the Soviets and civil war. Over the next few years the communists solidified their hold on Poland, falsifying elections, persecuting the opposition and eliminating it as a political power. Remnants of the armed resistance (NIE, Armed Forces Delegation for Poland, Freedom and Independence) that refused to lay down their weapons and surrender to the communist regime continued to hold out for several years as the cursed soldiers, fighting the Soviet-backed communist forces until eradicated.

== Political representation ==
The Underground State represented most, though not all, political factions of the Second Polish Republic. The Political Consultative Committee (PKP) represented four major Polish parties: the Socialist Party (PPS-WRN), the People's Party (SL), the SN, and the Labor Party (SP). The SP joined the PKP in June 1940, four months after the PKP was created, and the PPS-WRN withdrew from the PKP between October 1941 and March 1943. Those parties, known as the Big Four, were also represented in the Home Political Representation (KRP). Compared to PKP and KRP, the Council of National Unity was much more representative, and included representatives of several smaller political groupings. Several other groups lacked significant representation in PKP and KRP, but nonetheless had supported the Underground State. For example, the nationalists from the National Radical Camp Falanga formed the Confederation of the Nation, which included most members of the pre-war far-right, partially merging with the ZWZ around 1941 and finally joining the AK around fall 1943. Non-Polish ethnic minorities, primarily the Ukrainians and the Belarusians, were not represented in the Underground State; however, the Jews were.

The most important groups that refused to join the structures of the Polish Underground State included the communists (Polish Workers Party (PPR) and its military arm, the People's Guard, later transformed into the People's Army), and the far-right extremists from the National Radical Camp ABC (Group Szaniec and its military arm, the Military Organization Lizard Union). Both the extreme left (the communists) and the extreme right (the nationalists) did not recognise the Underground State and, in some cases, actively persecuted people connected with it. Only the PPR, however, opposed to Polish independence and supporting full inclusion of Poland in the Soviet Union, was seen as completely outside the framework of the State; the other groups were seen as a justifiable opposition. In 1944 PPR would become part of the Polish Committee of National Liberation (PKWN), a Soviet puppet government.

== Structure ==
=== Civilian ===
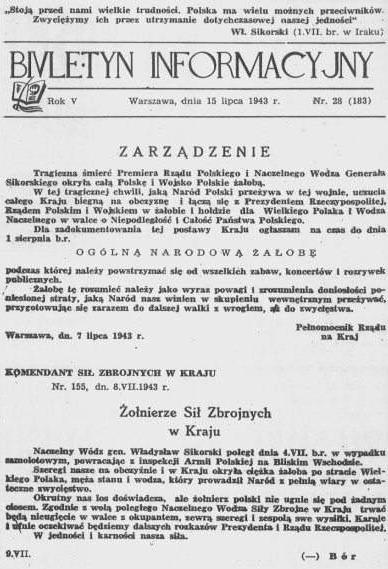
Polish Underground State's underground Information Bulletin, 15 July 1943, reporting the death of Gen. Sikorski and ordering a national day of mourning

The government in exile, located first in France and later in the United Kingdom, with the President, Prime Minister and the Commander-in-Chief of the Polish Army was the top military and civilian authority, recognized by the authorities of the Underground State as their commanders. The government in exile was represented in the occupied Poland by the Government Delegation for Poland, headed by the Government Delegate for Poland.

The main role of the civilian branch of the Underground State was to preserve the continuity of the Polish state as a whole, including its institutions. These institutions included the police, the courts, and schools. This branch of the state was intended to prepare cadres and institutions to resume power after the German defeat in World War II. By the final years of the war, the civilian structure of the Underground State included an underground parliament, administration, judiciary (courts and police), secondary and higher-level education, and supported various cultural activities such as the publishing of newspapers and books, underground theatres, lectures, exhibitions, concerts and safeguarded various works of art. It also dealt with providing social services, including to the destitute Jewish population (through the council to Aid Jews, or Żegota). Through the Directorate of Civil Resistance (1941–1943) the civil arm was also involved in lesser acts of resistance, such as minor sabotage, although in 1943 this department was merged with the Directorate of Covert Resistance, forming the Directorate of Underground Resistance, subordinate to AK.

The departments can be seen as loosely corresponding to ministries. Three departments were dedicated to war-related issues: the Department for Elimination of the Consequences of War, the Department for Public Works and Reconstruction, and the Department for Information and the Press; the other departments mirrored pre-war Polish ministries (e.g., Department of Post Offices and Telegraphs, or Department of the Treasury). The Delegate's Office was divided into departments, 14 of which existed toward the end of the war; the full list included: the Presidential Department, the Department of Internal Affairs, Justice Department, Employment and Social Welfare Department, Agriculture Department, Treasury Department, Trade and Industry Department, Postal and Telegraph Services Department, the Department for Elimination of the Consequences of War, Transport Department, Information and the Press, Department of Public Works and Reconstruction, Department of Education and Culture and the Department of National Defence.

On the geographical division level, the Delegation had local offices, dividing Polish territories into 16 voivodeships, each under an underground voivode, further divided into powiats headed by starostas, and with separate municipal bodies. In early 1944, the Delegation employed some 15,000 people in its administration; those were primarily older people, as the younger ones were recruited for the military side of the operations.

=== Military ===
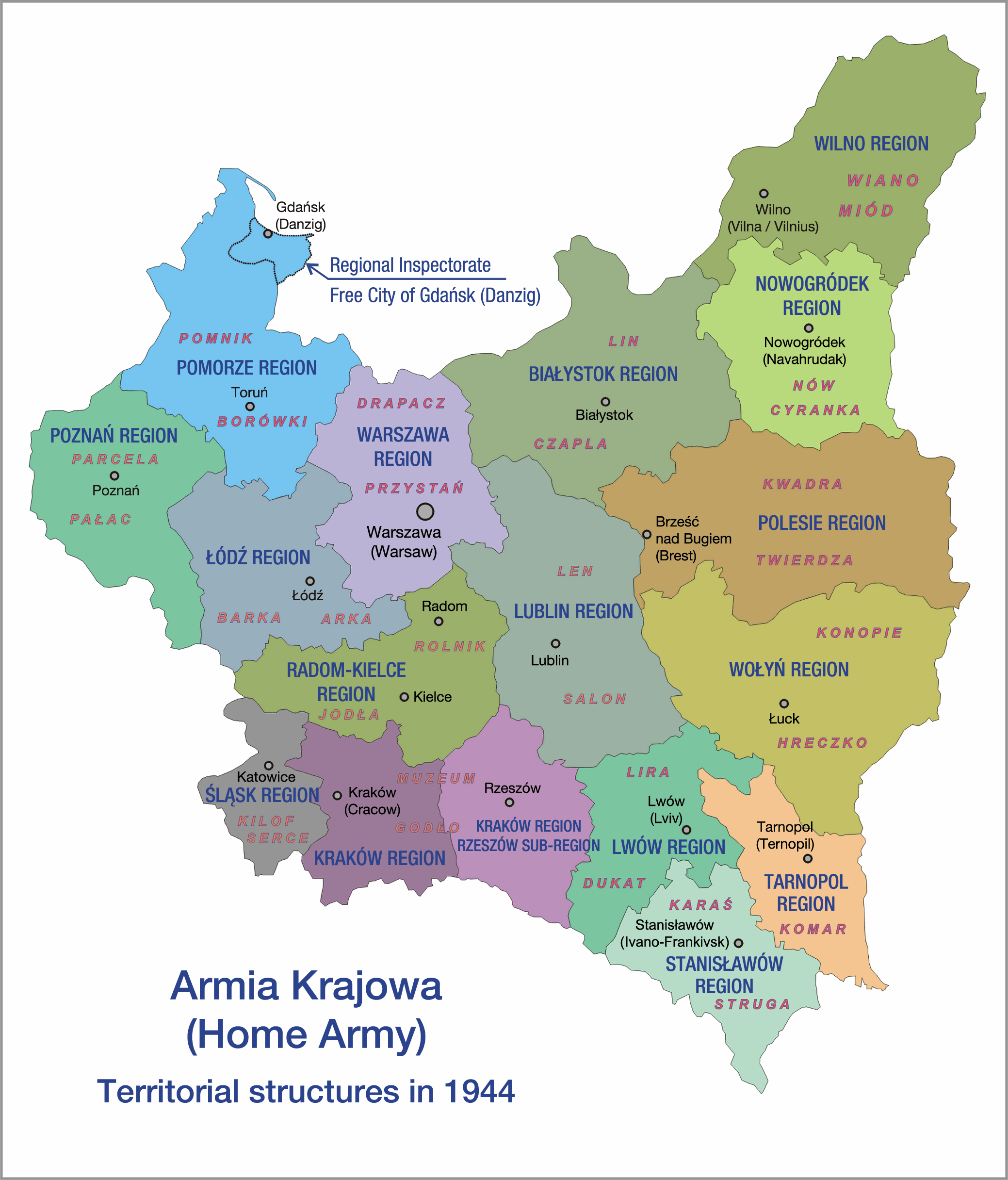
Regional organisation of Armia Krajowa in 1944

The military arm of the Polish Underground State consisted primarily of various branches of the Armia Krajowa (AK) and, until 1942, the Union of Armed Struggle. This arm of the state was designed to prepare the Polish society for a future fight for the country's liberation. Apart from armed resistance, sabotage, intelligence, training, and propaganda, the state's military arm was responsible for maintaining communication with the London-based government in exile and for protecting the civilian arm of the state.

The Armia Krajowa's primary resistance operations were the sabotage of German activities, including transports headed for the Eastern Front in the Soviet Union. The sabotage of German rail and road transports to the Eastern Front was so extensive that it is estimated that one-eighth of all German transports to the Eastern Front were destroyed or significantly delayed due to AK's activities.

The AK also fought several full-scale battles against the Germans, particularly in 1943 and 1944 during Operation Tempest. They tied down significant German forces, worth at least several divisions (upper estimates suggest about 930,000 troops), diverting much-needed supplies, while trying to support the Soviet military. Polish intelligence operatives supplied valuable intelligence information to the Allies; 43% of all reports received by British secret services from continental Europe in 1939–1945 came from Polish sources. At its height, AK numbered over 400,000 and was recognised as one of the three largest, or even the largest, resistance movements of the war. Axis fatalities due to the actions of the Polish underground, of which AK formed the bulk, are estimated at up to 150,000.

== Definition, historiography and remembrance ==
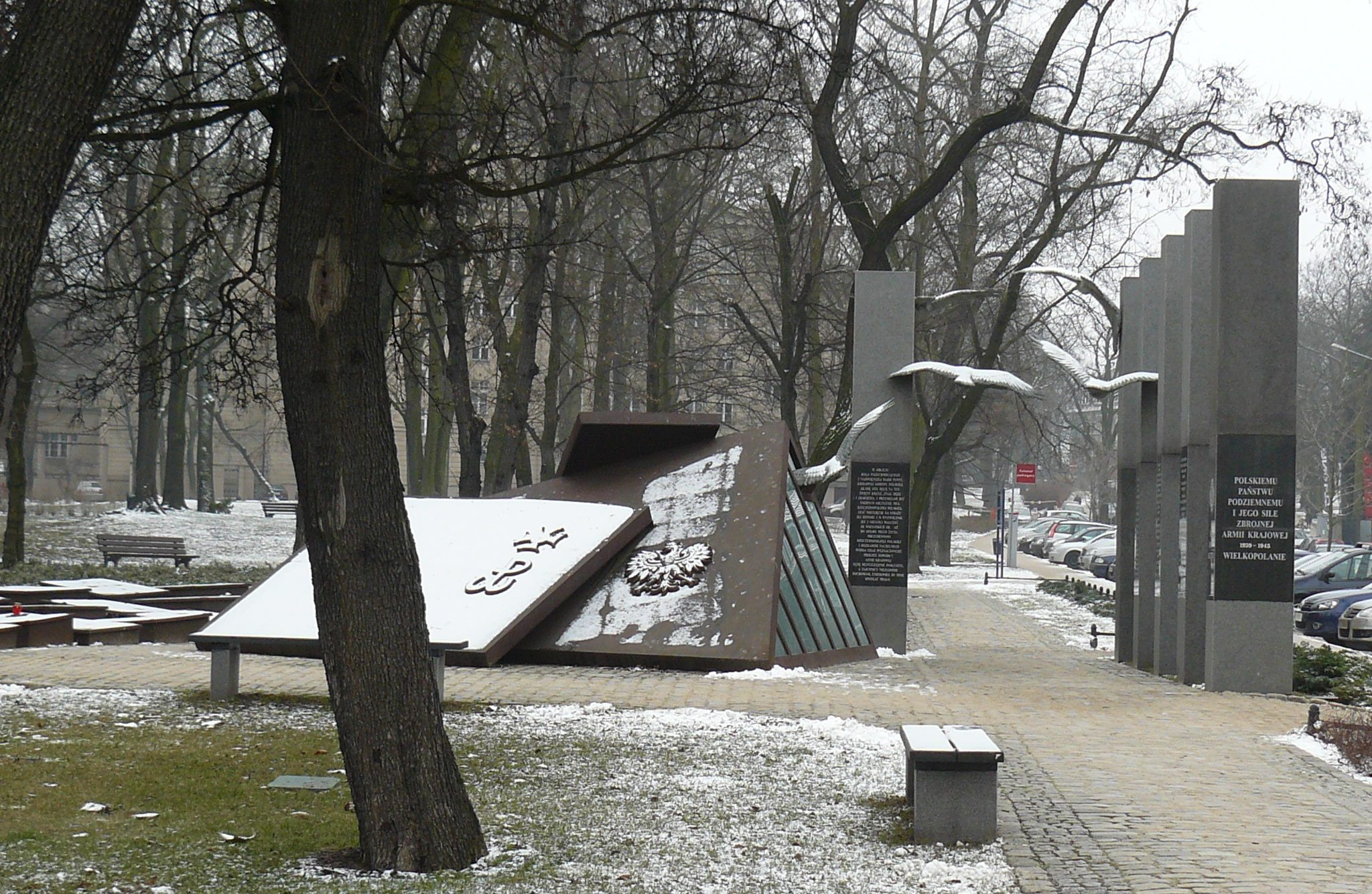
The Polish Underground State Monument in Poznań

For decades, research on the Polish Underground State was restricted, largely because the communist People's Republic of Poland did not wish to fully acknowledge the role of the non-communist resistance. During the first postwar Stalinist years, efforts to explore this topic were regarded as dangerous, bordering on illegal. Research into the events occurring in the Soviet-annexed territories in the 1939–1941 period was particularly difficult. The limited research devoted to the Underground State that did take place was done mainly by Polish émigré historians living in the West. The communist state downplayed the importance of the non-communist resistance movements, while the communist movement (Armia Ludowa) was emphasised as being of primary importance; in fact, the opposite was true. The absence of research by Polish scholars, along with obstacles presented to foreign scholars seeking access to source material in communist Poland, contributed to a situation in which there was virtually no discussion by Western scholars of one of Europe's largest resistance movements — the non-communist Polish resistance movement. The bulk of Western research centred on the much smaller French Resistance (la Résistance).

With the fall of communism, Poland regained full independence and Polish scholars could begin unrestricted research into all aspects of Polish history. Scholars who chose to investigate the Underground State were also confronted with the issue of its uniqueness (no country or nation has ever created a similar institution), and hence, the problem of defining it. Polish historian Stanisław Salmonowicz, discussing the historiography of the Polish Underground State, defined it as a "collection of state-legal, organisational and citizenship structures, which were to ensure the constitutional continuation of Polish statehood on its own territory". Salmonowicz concluded that "This constitutional continuity, real performance of the state's functions on its past territory and the loyalty of a great majority of Polish society were the most significant elements of its existence."

The Underground State also became officially recognised by the Polish government, local authorities and the community, with most major cities in Poland erecting various memorials to the Underground State-affiliated resistance. In Poznań, there is a dedicated Polish Underground State Monument erected in 2007. On 11 September 1998, the Sejm (parliament) of Poland declared the day of 27 September (anniversary of the founding of the Service for Poland's Victory organisation) to be the Day of the Polish Underground State.

== See also ==
- History of Poland (1939–1945)
- History of Poland (1945–1989)
- Home Army
- Kotwica
- Minor sabotage
- Occupation of Poland (1939–1945)
- Polish contribution to World War II
- Polish resistance movement in World War II
- Polish Resettlement Corps
