= Main Political Council =

Main Political Council (Polish: Główna Rada Polityczna) was a political advisory body created in Poland as part of Service for Poland's Victory resistance organisation during the early stages of World War II. A sort of an underground quasi-parliament, the council was formed by members of political parties that had been marginalised by the Sanacja that had ruled Poland until the outbreak of the war. Among its members were politicians of Polish Socialist Party, People's Party and National Party.
