= Labour Faction (1937) =

Labour Faction Stronnictwo Pracy
- First leader: Wojciech Korfanty
- Last leader: Tadeusz Michejda
- Founded: 10 October 1937
- Dissolved: 9 July 1950
- Succeeded by: Christian-Democratic Labour Party
- Headquarters: Warsaw
- Ideology: Political Catholicism; Christian democracy
- Political position: Centre to centre-right
- Colours: Azure

The Labour Faction (Polish: Stronnictwo Pracy, SP) was a Polish Christian democratic political party, active from 1937 in the Second Polish Republic and later part of the Polish government in exile. Its founders and main activists were Wojciech Korfanty and Karol Popiel.

The party continued its operations as part of the Polish Underground State during World War II (when it was code-named Romb). Two politicians of the party served as heads of the Government Delegation for Poland, the civilian representatives of the Polish Underground State within occupied Poland, Cyryl Ratajski (1940–1942) and Jan Jankowski (1943–1945).

The party was taken over by a pro-communist faction in 1946, with the rise of the People's Republic of Poland. As a satellite party it participated in 1947 election, and continued to exist until 1950 when it merged into the Democratic Party (Stronnictwo Demokratyczne), an officially sanctioned party in communist Poland, also described as a "satellite" of the communist Polish United Workers' Party (PZPR).

In 1989, after the fall of communism in Poland, an attempt was made to revive the party under the name Christian Democratic Labour Party.

The party should be distinguished from the Labour Party (Partia Pracy) of the same period.

== Election results ==
=== Sejm ===
Year	Popular vote	% of vote	Seats
1947	530,979	4.72 (#3)	12 / 444

== See also ==
- Front Morges
